= Agrippine =

Agrippine may refer to:

- Agrippine (comics)
- Agrippine (TV series)
