= Trax (cartoonist) =

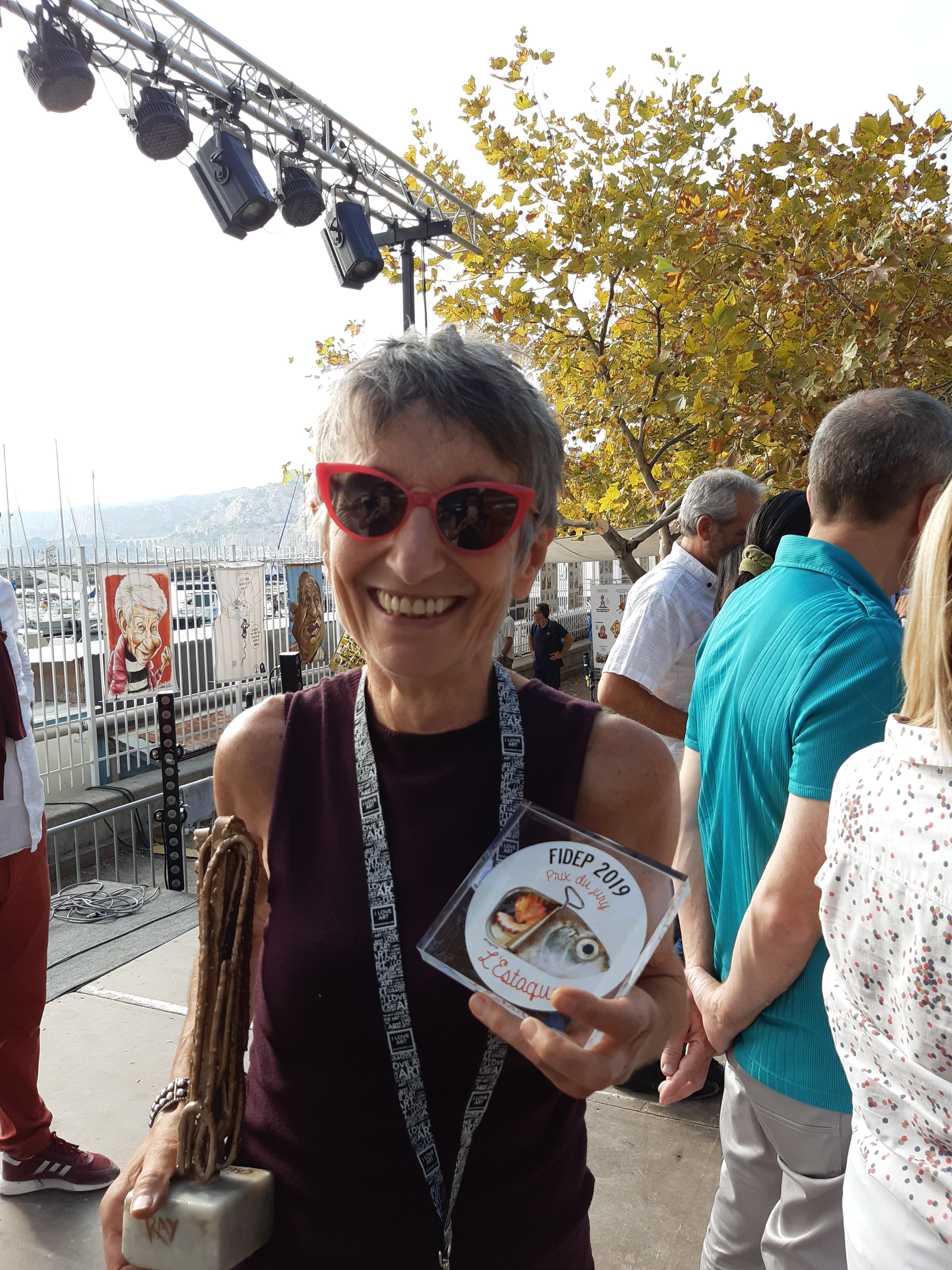
Trax in 2019

Trax, the pen name of Christine Traxeler (born 1953), is a French press cartoonist, illustrator, and activist known for her satirical and politically engaged visual commentary. Active in editorial illustration, public workshops, and international cartooning networks, she has contributed to multiple campaigns promoting freedom of expression and social justice.

== Life ==
Born in 1953, Trax first began drawing as a young child. Originally trained as a lawyer, she practiced for seven years before leaving the legal profession in 1983, disillusioned with its ability to effect social change. Subsequently, she became involved in a variety of cultural and artistic activities, including organising environmentally focused music festivals, working as a scenic painter, and participating in theatre, before taking up work as an illustrator and cartoonist.

From the early 2000s Trax was a regular contributor to Le Ravi, a satirical monthly newspaper without advertising based in Provence-Alpes-Côte d’Azur. She also creates work for other associative and independent journals such as Espoir, Zélium, and La Lettre du Musicien.

== Work ==
Trax's work combines satire, social commentary, and political engagement. She often produces wordless cartoons for their ability to communicate ideas universally across linguistic and cultural boundaries. Trax has cited artists such as Ralph Steadman, Boligan, Sempé, Claire Brétécher, and Catherine Beaunez as important influences on her style and has referred to press illustration as a "tool of activism, a weapon, albeit a non‑violent one."

In addition to editorial work, she has contributed illustrations for books and literary projects. She has provided drawings for associative and activist publications, including work for organisations such as Droit au logement (Right to Housing), and has produced posters and materials to support various causes. Trax engages in educational and social outreach, delivering workshops and interventions in schools, prisons, nursing homes, and centres for people with disabilities.
