= Agrippine (TV series) =

French animated television series

- Based on: Agrippine by: Claire Bretécher
- Country of origin: France
- No. of seasons: 1
- No. of episodes: 26

Production
- Running time: 26 minutes
- Production company: Ellipsanime

Original release
- Network: Canal +
- Release: November 12 – December 31, 2001

Agrippine is a French animated series, adapted from the comic strip by Claire Bretécher it was debuted on 12 November 2001 on Canal +. Bretécher was not involved in the project, and was not impressed with the results.

== Synopsis ==
This series is an adaptation of the comic book series Agrippine created by Claire Bretécher in 1988.

It features Agrippine, a sixteen-year-old girl raised by hippy parents. Agrippine is a sarcastic and rebellious young girl with her anxieties, her problems and her joys.

== Cast ==
- Julia Vaidis-Bogard : Agrippine
- Frédérique Tirmont : Poule
- Jean-Gabriel Nordmann : Merlan
- Bilal Chennoune : Biron
- Nadia Barentin : Ninifle
- Axelle Charvoz : Bergère
- François Comar : Modern
- Benjamin van Meggelen : Morose le Hachis

== Episode list ==
No.	Title	Original release date
1	(French: Mezzanine)	November 12, 2001
2	(French: Dépression)	TBA
3	(French: Trahison)	TBA
4	(French: Casting)	TBA
5	(French: Aliénation)	TBA
6	(French: Outing)	TBA
7	(French: L'ancêtre)	TBA
8	(French: Horrible)	TBA
9	(French: Jalousie)	TBA
10	(French: Amour)	TBA
11	(French: Adoption)	TBA
12	(French: Éducation)	TBA
13	(French: Libération)	TBA
14	(French: Rome)	TBA
15	(French: Déconnexion)	TBA
16	(French: Engouement)	TBA
17	(French: Répression)	TBA
18	(French: Imagination)	TBA
19	(French: Grèce)	TBA
20	(French: Spiritisme)	TBA
21	(French: Territoire)	TBA
22	(French: Installation)	TBA
23	(French: Peur)	TBA
24	(French: Vanité)	TBA
25	(French: Hospitalisation)	TBA
26	(French: Expression)	TBA
