= Agrippine (comics) =

French comic series

Publication information
- Publisher: Dargaud
- Publication date: January 1988 – 2009

Creative team
- Written by: Claire Bretécher

Agrippine is a comic book series produced by the French writer Claire Bretécher, whose nine albums were published between 1988 and 2009.

It presents the existential dilemmas and the futile concerns of a spoiled teenager, absurdly caricaturing the shortcomings of a Parisian bourgeoisie stuck between existentialism and consumer society. Teens are portrayed as false rebels primarily concerned with appearance and seduction, while adults are often developmentally impaired hippies who want to keep their illusion of freedom of mind while leading a cramped life.

== Albums ==
In 1988, the first volume, "Agrippine", was released, which allowed you to get to know the vocabulary and the characters. Three years later, in 1991, released the second album, "Agrippina takes steam", the title of which includes a phrase often used in Agrippina. This second volume shows Agrippina's reaction when her best friend finds a boyfriend. The two following albums, “Les Combats d'Agrippine” (1993) and “Agrippine et les inclus” (1995), show Agrippina's first loves (Morose le Hachis and Persil Wagonnet).

In 1998, the comic book took a new turn with “Agrippine et l'ancêtre”, which featured Zonzon, Agrippina's great-grandmother. This album is the best-selling of the series. In the continuity of the previous album, “Agrippina et la secte à Raymonde” (2001) has its own intrigue: Agrippina's friends all gradually fall into a sect. In 2004, "Allergies" was released, which received mixed reviews, due to Agrippina's transformation into a young girl who smokes and takes drugs. The eighth and last album, Agrippine déconfite , was released in 2009. All of the first five volumes were released in 2000 and the one which brings together the eight volumes was released in 2010.

== Characters ==
The characters in 'Agrippine' are caricatures of the adolescents of the 1990s and their parents, who often have a "'68 mentality". Bretécher herself insisted that more than her characters themselves, it was the situations in which she placed them that interested her.

=== Agrippine and her family ===
- Agrippine: main character of the series, Agrippine is a high school student in the midst of teenage rebellion, with all the characteristics of young people of her age: the existential questions about the meaning of life, curiosity about sexuality, curiosity about boys, endless chatter with girlfriends, rumors, quarrels with parents, etc. She has no specific plans for the future and is not interested in much. She regrets that her parents did not divorce when they had the chance because it would have given her twice as many gifts at Christmas and birthdays. Her name refers to Agrippina the Younger, a famous poisoner of ancient Rome.
- Poule: mother of Agrippine, Poule strives to take stoically the various quirks of her offspring but only succeeds thanks to a good daily dose of sedatives. She is a lawyer.
- Merlan: father of Agrippine. He and Poule almost divorced when Agrippine was little; since then, they no longer speak to each other, except in an emergency. Merlan is a writer; his works often have molluscs as their theme. He is very protective of his daughter and finds it difficult to see her becoming an adult.
- Biron: little brother of Agrippine, who cannot stand the "pee-poo" humor that she likes to impose on him. About 8 years old, he is already very good at making money, for example by organizing paid visits to his very old great-grandmother.
- Grandma: mother of Poule, she is a dynamic grandmother, always ready to travel and discover new horizons. We know that she was married to a communist, for which her own mother has not forgiven her. She calls him 'Ninifle' because of his childhood colds. She pretends to be dead in "Agrippine déconfite".
- Zonzon: Agrippine's great-grandmother, appeared in Agrippine and the ancestor . Aged 95 and a half, she forgets the first names of her family members but remains very gifted in mental arithmetic and open to the world computing. She doesn't like animals.
- Uncle Jean-Mi: Poule's brother. Called 'Jean-Million' , he hates his first name and wants to be called 'Scott' . He is a math teacher. He has a one-off flirtation with Rouge-Gorge. He embarks on dubious television projects in Agrippine déconfite.
- Candida: babysitter and Portuguese housekeeper with a half Spanish accent. She already appeared in Docteur Ventouse, bobologue and Le Destin de Monique (which gives her last name, Rosario).

=== Friends ===
- Bergère Leprince: best friend of Agrippine who nicknames her "Cod-Sauce-verte". Both swore to tell each other everything, especially about the boys. Bergère is deeply involved in humanitarian work, although in unusual actions such as the reintegration of old delinquents. She has an enormous complex about her small breasts. In Agrippina takes steam , she is the first of the two to "conclude" (having sex) with a boy, Mirtil Galère, which causes Agrippine to be jealous. Her name refers to the shepherdess who marries a Prince Charming in fairy tales.
- Modern Mesclun: eternal failed lover of Agrippine, on the grounds that he drools. He desperately tries to get noticed by the whole world and plays the philosopher (“Nothing serious was thought of between Plato and Modern Mesclun.”). He is computer savvy and shows a rare talent for analyzing romantic relationships with other teens and predicting their development (“Mouth of Oracle” in “Agrippina takes steam).” The mesclun is a mixture of Salade.
- Rouge-Gorge de Cossé-Balzac: "Crazy mytho megalo nympho" as defined by her classmates, she is a young girl obsessed with her physique. Although quite round, she wants to become a top model. She is a consummate liar and tells everyone that she knows the most famous stars who are, of course, all in love with her. She also believes that any boy who looks at her will fantasize about her or even fall in love with her. She had her lips swollen with collagen. Her name combines Cossé-Brissac and Balzac.
- Psyche Chia: second best friend of Agrippine. Possibly her name is a pun on Chéchia.
- Moonlight Mollard: Agrippine's third best friend.
- Morose le Hachis: first boy with whom Agrippine goes out, he affects non-conformism to the point of absurdity. He teaches Agrippine about "non-being".
- Mirtil Galère: he goes out with Bergère in Agrippine takes steam, then with Agrippine at the end of the same album. He uses Latin phrases over and over again in his dialogues.
- Muflée Madredios: anorexic girl the same age as Agrippine. She joined the sect in Raymonde in the album of the same name and ended up crushed by a bronze drainer after a very severe fast.
- Canaan Linchbage: computer scientist appeared in Agrippine and the Ancestor . He and Agrippina fell in love at first sight to the point of "concluding" without waiting on Zonzon's bed. In Agrippine and the sect in Raymonde , he integrates a sect and tries to bring Agrippine into it when she has just left him. The name is a possible allusion to Château Lynch-Bages, a Médoc vineyard, and probably to Charles Babbage, mathematician and pioneer of computer science.

== Analysis ==
=== A social critique in line with Bretécher's work ===
Pierre Bourdieu qualifies "Agrippine" as "a rigorous, almost ethnographic […] evocation" of the Parisian intellectual bourgeoisie, grasped in all its aspects: bodily postures, language, concerns (such as the parents' obsession with academic success). The issues linked to stepfamilies are particularly exposed.

This documentary aspect does not prevent Bretécher from creating "deeply universal" adolescent characters, mocking at the youthism of adults and a skepticism tinged with indifference in the face of their contradictory injunctions. This social criticism is in line with the Frustrés (1973-1981), of which Agrippine appears "in a way the bastard girl […], as superficial and selfish as her activist parents wanted to be committed and determined to changing society".

In L'Obs, Bretécher explains the choice of this "horrifying" first name: "She is Nero's mother. I wanted someone you wanted to hate right away."

=== An inventive language ===
Agrippinehas regularly been famous for its formidably inventive language. In her previous works, notably Les Frustrés, Bretécher had made language one of the best means of caricaturing the emptiness and contradictions of her archetypal characters.

In Agrippine, the author continues to catalog the tics of language of her contemporaries, while going "well beyond the caricature In fact, she stages French through a contemporary French slang not only restored but also largely invented, for example when she extrapolates adolescent language tics ("poorly digested anglicisms, verlan and elliptical constructions, abbreviations and deformations or that she invites various terms to evoke the complexity of family ties in the age of divorces ("faux-demi", "double-demi", "demi-doubles). Bretécher, however, succeeded in giving her inventions an extremely natural aspect, going "always in the direction of the language itself.

This verbal inventiveness testifying to "a keen sense of participant observation. has remained constant throughout the twenty years over which the publication of the series has been spread over. She participates greatly in Agrippina's humor.

== Adaptation ==
- In 2001, "Agrippine" was adapted as a 26-episode 26-minute animated television series directed by Frank Viber. Bretécher was not really involved in the project, aware that in any case she would be disappointed.
- In 2012, the comic strip was adapted by Christèle Wurmser for the radio on France Culture for a series of five 23-minute episodes.

== List of albums ==
- Agrippine, editions:
1. Agrippine, 1988.
2. Agrippine prend vapeur, 1991.
3. Les Combats d'Agrippine, 1992.
4. Agrippine et les Inclus, 1993.
5. Agrippine et l'Ancêtre, 1998
6. Agrippine et la Secte à Raymonde, 2001.
7. Allergies, 2004.
8. Agrippine déconfite, Dargaud, 2009.

== Bibliography ==
- Bourdieu, Pierre (January 1996). "Agrippine et le moderne". Lecture Jeune (77): 22. ISSN 1163-4987.
- Gravett, Paul (2012). De 1970 à 1989 : Agrippine (Flammarion ed.). Flammarion. p. 524. ISBN 978-2081277731.
- Quillien, Christophe (October 2014). Enfants terribles et dames indignes : Agrippine (Huginn & Muninn ed.). Huginn & Muninn. pp. 190–191. ISBN 9782364801851.
- Yaguello, Marina (January 1996). "Bretécher prend vapeur". Lecture Jeune (77): 23–4. ISSN 1163-4987.
