= Bande dessinée =

Comics of the classic Franco-Belgian style

A bande dessinée (pl. bandes dessinés, abbr. BD; lit. 'drawn strip'), also known as a Franco-Belgian comic (French: BD franco-belge), is a comic that is usually originally in French and is created for readership in France and Belgium. These countries have a long tradition in comics, separate from that of English-language comics. Belgium is a mostly bilingual country, and comics originally in Dutch (stripverhalen, lit. 'strip stories', or simply "strips") are culturally a part of the world of bandes dessinées, even if the translation from French to Dutch far outweighs the other direction.

Among the most popular bandes dessinées are The Adventures of Tintin (by Hergé), Spirou and Fantasio (Franquin et al.), Gaston (Franquin), Asterix (Goscinny & Uderzo), Lucky Luke (Morris & Goscinny), The Smurfs (Peyo) and Spike and Suzy (Willy Vandersteen). Some highly regarded realistically drawn and plotted bandes dessinées include Blueberry (Charlier & Giraud, a.k.a. "Mœbius"), Thorgal (Van Hamme & Rosiński), XIII (Van Hamme & Vance), and the creations of Hermann Huppen.

== Reach ==
In Europe, French is spoken natively not only in France and the city state of Monaco, but also by significant portions of the population of Belgium, Luxembourg, and Switzerland. The shared language creates an artistic and commercial market where national identity is often blurred, and one of the main rationales for the concept of the (English) "Franco-Belgian comics" expression. The potential appeal of the French-language BDs extends beyond Francophone Europe, as France in particular has strong historical and cultural ties with several Francophone overseas territories. Of these territories it is Quebec, Canada, where Franco-Belgian BDs are doing best, due – aside from the fact that it has the largest BD reading Francophone population outside Europe – to that province's close historical and cultural ties with France from colonisation, in the process heavily influencing its own native Quebec comics scene. This is in stark contrast to the English-speaking part of the country, which is culturally US comics oriented.

While the originally Flemish Belgian comic albums are influenced by Francophone BDs, especially in the early years, they evolved into a distinctly different style, both in art and in spirit, which is why they are nowadays sub-categorised as Flemish comics, as their evolution started to take a different path from the late 1940s onward. And while French-language publications are habitually translated into Dutch, Flemish publications are less commonly translated into French, for cultural reasons. Likewise, despite the shared language, Flemish BDs do not do that well in the Netherlands and vice versa, save for some notable exceptions, such as the Willy Vandersteen creation Spike and Suzy, which is popular across the border. Concurrently, the socio-cultural idiosyncrasies contained within many Flemish BDs also means that these comics have seen far less translations into other languages than their French-language counterparts have due to their more universal appeal, and the French language's cultural status.

Belgium is officially a trilingual country as there is a German-speaking Community of Belgium. Belgian BD home market first print releases, be it in Dutch or in French, are rarely translated into that language with German-speaking Belgians having to wait for internationally released editions for reading in their native tongue, typically those from licensed publishers stemming from neighbouring Germany. Though Dutch and German both are Germanic languages, the German-speaking Community lies within the territory of the Walloon Region, so that French is the most utilised (second) language in that area and has caused the handful of BD artists originating from there, such as Hermann and Didier Comès, to create their BDs in French. Born Dieter Hermann Comès, Comès actually "Frenchified" his given name to this end, whereas Hermann Huppen has dispensed with his (Germanic) family name "Huppen" for his BD credits as "Hermann", though he maintained the Germanic spelling for his first name. Due to its relative modesty, both in size and in scope, and despite the close historical and cultural ties, no German-Belgian artists are as of 2018 known to have created BDs specifically for the German comics world, when discounting commercial translations of their original Francophone creations.

A similar situation exists in France, which has several regional languages, of which Breton and Occitan are two of the more substantial ones. But while these languages are culturally recognised as regional languages, they are not official national languages, contrary to Belgium in regard to German, with similar consequences as in Belgium for BDs and their artists. Native BDs are rarely, if at all, released in these languages by the main BD publishers, whereas artists stemming from these regions, invariably create their BDs in French (Note: Occasionally, small, independent local and regional publishers obtain licenses from the main BD publisher to release albums of the more popular BDs in translation into the native tongue – albeit almost always long after the original French-language release of the album in question. One such known publisher is Bannoù-Heol (est. 1999), operating out of Quimper, Brittany, who has released several Breton-translated BD albums. The aim of the publisher, and others of its kind, is not primarily a commercial one, but rather a cultural one, intended as a means to keep Breton – like many other regional languages in danger of becoming extinct – a living and breathing language. For the Catalan and to some extent Occitan readership there is an alternative though, with several Spanish BD publishers, including for example, Norma Editorial and the Spanish subsidiary of Glénat Editions. These are based in Catalonia's capital city, Barcelona, and regularly release Catalan-language versions of their BDs, which include imported Franco-Belgian BDs, of which Asterix, The Smurfs and The Adventures of Tintin are prime examples.) – like their German-Belgian counterparts forced to do so in order to gain commercial access to the main market. The situation for France's German-speaking minority is therefore identical to its more sizeable counterpart in northern neighbour Belgium in regard to BD-related matters.

== Vocabulary ==
The term bandes dessinées is derived from the original description of the art form as "drawn strips". It was first introduced in the 1930s, but only became popular in the 1960s, by which time the "BD" abbreviation was also in use for its book, or album, publications formats.

Bandes dessinées were described as the "ninth art" in Francophone scholarship on the medium (le neuvième art). The "ninth art" designation stems from a 1964 article by Claude Beylie in the magazine Lettres et Médecins, and was subsequently popularised in an article series about the history of comics, which appeared in weekly instalments in Spirou magazine from 1964 to 1967. Written by Belgian Morris with editorial input from the below-mentioned Frenchman Claude Moliterni, the article series was in itself an example of a Franco-Belgian BD project. The publication of Francis Lacassin's book Pour un neuvième art: la bande dessinée in 1971 further established the term.

In North America, Franco-Belgian BDs are often seen as equivalent to what are known as graphic novels — most likely a result of their deviating from the US 32-page comic book standard. In recent decades the English "graphic novel" expression has increasingly been adopted in Europe as well in the wake of the works of Will Eisner and Art Spiegelman, but with the specific intent to discriminate between comics intended for a younger and/or general readership, and publications which are more likely to feature mature content, literary subject matter or experimental styles. As a result, European BD scholars have retroactively identified the 1962 Barbarella comic by Jean-Claude Forest (for its theme) and the first 1967 Corto Maltese adventure The Ballad of the Salty Sea (Note: Una ballata del mare salato) by Hugo Pratt (for both art, and story style) in particular, as the comics up for consideration as the first European "graphic novels".

== History ==
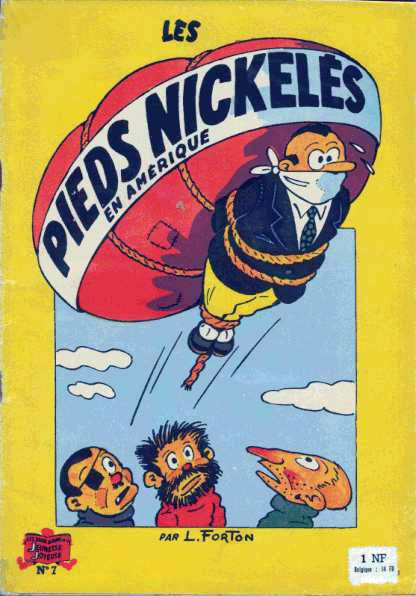
The French comic Les Pieds Nickelés (1954 book cover): an early 20th-century forerunner of the modern Franco-Belgian comic

During the 19th century, there were many artists in Europe drawing cartoons, occasionally even utilising sequential multi-panel narration, albeit mostly with clarifying captions and dialogue placed under the panels rather than the speech balloons commonly used today. These were humorous short works rarely longer than a single page. In the Francophonie, artists such as Gustave Doré, Nadar, Christophe and Caran d'Ache began to be involved with the medium.

=== Early 1900s – 1929: Precursors ===
In the early decades of the 20th century, comics were not stand-alone publications, but were published in newspapers and weekly or monthly magazines as episodes or gags. Aside from these magazines, the Catholic Church, in the form of its then powerful and influential Union des œuvres ouvrières catholiques de France, was creating and distributing "healthy and correct" magazines for children. In the early 1900s, the first popular French comics appeared. Two of the most prominent comics include Bécassine and Les Pieds Nickelés.

In the 1920s, after the end of the first world war, the French artist Alain Saint-Ogan started out as a professional cartoonist, creating the successful series Zig et Puce in 1925. Saint-Ogan was one of the first French-speaking artists to fully utilise techniques popularised and formularised in the United States, such as Speech balloons, even though the text comic format would remain the predominant native format for the next two to three decades in France, propagated as such by France's educators. In 1920, the Abbot of Averbode in Belgium started publishing Zonneland, a magazine consisting largely of text with few illustrations, which started printing comics more often in the following years.

Even though Les Pieds Nickelés, Bécassine and Zig et Puce managed to survive the war for a little while longer, modernised in all three cases and all of them continued by artists (the most notable one being Belgian Greg for the latter in the 1960s) other than the original creators, none of them succeeded to find a readership outside France itself and are consequently remembered in their native country only.

=== 1929–1940: Birth of the modern Franco-Belgian comic ===
One of the earliest proper Belgian comics was Hergé's The Adventures of Tintin, with the story Tintin in the Land of the Soviets, which was published in Le Petit Vingtième in 1929. It was quite different from future versions of Tintin, the style being very naïve and simple, even childish, compared to the later stories. The early Tintin stories often featured racist and political stereotypes, which caused controversies after the war, and which Hergé later regretted. After Tintin's early massive success, the magazine decided to release the stories in hardcover book format as well, directly after they had run their respective courses in the magazine — in the process introducing something new in the Belgian comic world: the comic album. The 1930 Tintin au pays des Soviets title is generally considered the first of its kind – even though there are three similar Zig et Puce titles from French publisher Hachette, known to predate the Tintin title by one to two years, but which failed to find an audience outside France. The magazine continued to do so for the subsequent three stories until 1934 when the magazine, as such not particularly well-suited as book publisher, turned album publication over to Belgian specialised book publisher Casterman, who has been the Tintin album publisher ever since.

The criticisms regarding the early stories notwithstanding and even though the format still had a long way to go, Tintin is widely considered the starting point and archetype of the modern Franco-Belgian comic as currently understood, and as amply demonstrated in the vast majority of treatises and reference works written on the subject since the 1960s, and the first to find a readership outside its originating country. As such the Tintin series went on to become one of the greatest post-war successes of the Franco-Belgian comic world, having seen translations in dozens of languages, including English, as well as becoming one of the relatively few European comics to have seen a major, successful, Hollywood movie adaptation as late as 2011, nearly thirty years after the death of its creator.

A further step towards modern comic books happened in 1934 when Hungarian Paul Winkler, who had previously been distributing comics to the monthly magazines via his Opera Mundi bureau, made a deal with King Features Syndicate to create Le Journal de Mickey, a weekly 8-page early "comic-book". The success was immediate, and soon other publishers started publishing periodicals with US series, which enjoyed considerable popularity in both France and Belgium. This continued during the remainder of the decade, with hundreds of magazines publishing mostly imported material. The most important ones in France were Robinson (with Flash Gordon and Mandrake), Hurrah (with Brick Bradford, Ace Drummond and King), and the Fleurus presse (on behalf of the Action catholique des enfants a.k.a. Cœurs Vaillants et Âmes Vaillantes de France) publications Cœurs Vaillants ("Valiant Hearts", 1929, for adolescent boys), Âmes vaillantes ("Valiant Souls", 1937, for adolescent girls) and Fripounet et Marisette (1945, for pre-adolescents), while Belgian examples included Wrill and Bravo.

Cœurs Vaillants started to publish The Adventures of Tintin in syndication from 1930 onward, constituting one of the earliest known French-Belgian comic world cross-fertilisations, only reinforced when Abbot Courtois, editor-in-chief of Cœurs Vaillants, asked Hergé to create a series about real children with a real family as opposed to Tintin's ambiguous age and family (and thus more in line with the Catholic norms and values on which the magazine was founded), which resulted in the 1936 comic The Adventures of Jo, Zette and Jocko. Incidentally, as Hergé created his comics in the increasingly popular speech balloon format, it initially led to a conflict with Cœurs Vaillants, which utilised the text comic format its editors considered more appropriate from an educational point-of-view. Hergé won the argument, and speech balloon comics were henceforth featured alongside text comics in the magazine (and that of its spin-offs) until the mid-1960s, when speech balloon comics were all but abandoned by the magazine(s), the general trend notwithstanding.

In 1938, the Belgian Spirou magazine was launched. Conceived in response to the immense popularity of Journal de Mickey and the success of Tintin in Le Petit Vingtième, the black and white/colour hybrid magazine featured predominantly comics from an US origin (Red Ryder, Dick Tracy, Superman) at the time of its launch until the war years, but there were also native comics included. These concerned Spirou, created by the Frenchman Rob-Vel (and thus another early cross-fertilisation example) and who served as the mascot and namesake for the new magazine, and Tif et Tondu created by Belgian artist Fernand Dineur. Both series would survive the war and achieve considerable popularity after the war, albeit under the aegis of other artists (see below). Published in a bi-lingual country, Spirou simultaneously appeared in a Dutch-language version as well under the name Robbedoes for the Flemish market. Export to the Netherlands followed a few years later shortly after the war. The magazine was conceived and published by publisher Éditions Dupuis S.A. (as of 1989, simply: Dupuis), which was established by its founding namesake Jean Dupuis as a printing business in 1898, but changed to being a publishing house in 1922, publishing non-comic books and magazines. Since the launch of Spirou however, Dupuis has increasingly focused on comic productions and is currently, as of 2017, a comics publisher exclusively and one of the great Belgian Franco-Belgian comic publishing houses still in existence.

As post-war exports to France (like in the Netherlands, the magazine was not available in France until 1945-46), Spirou – featuring the (early) creations of Belgian greats like Morris, Franquin and Jijé – became a significant inspiration for future French BD greats such as Jean "Mœbius" Giraud and Jean-Claude Mézières, eventually setting them off on their comic careers, but who were schoolboys at the time they became acquainted with the magazine.

=== 1940–1944: War and occupation ===
When Germany invaded France and Belgium, it became close to impossible to import US comics. The occupying Nazis banned US animated movies and comics they deemed to be of a questionable character. Both were, however, already very popular before the war and the hardships of the war period only seemed to increase the demand. This created an opportunity for many young artists to start working in the comics and animation business. At first, authors like Jijé in Spirou and Edgar P. Jacobs in Bravo continued unfinished US stories of Superman and Flash Gordon. Thus, by imitating the style and flow of those comics, they improved their knowledge of how to make efficient comics. Soon even those homemade versions of US comics had to stop, and the authors had to create their own heroes and stories, giving the new talents a chance to be published. Many of the most famous artists of the Franco-Belgian comics started in this period, including the Belgians André Franquin, Peyo (who started together at the small Belgian animation studio Compagnie Belge d'Animation – CBA), Willy Vandersteen, and the Frenchmen Jacques Martin and Albert Uderzo, who worked for Bravo.

=== 1944–1959: Post-war era Belgian supremacy ===
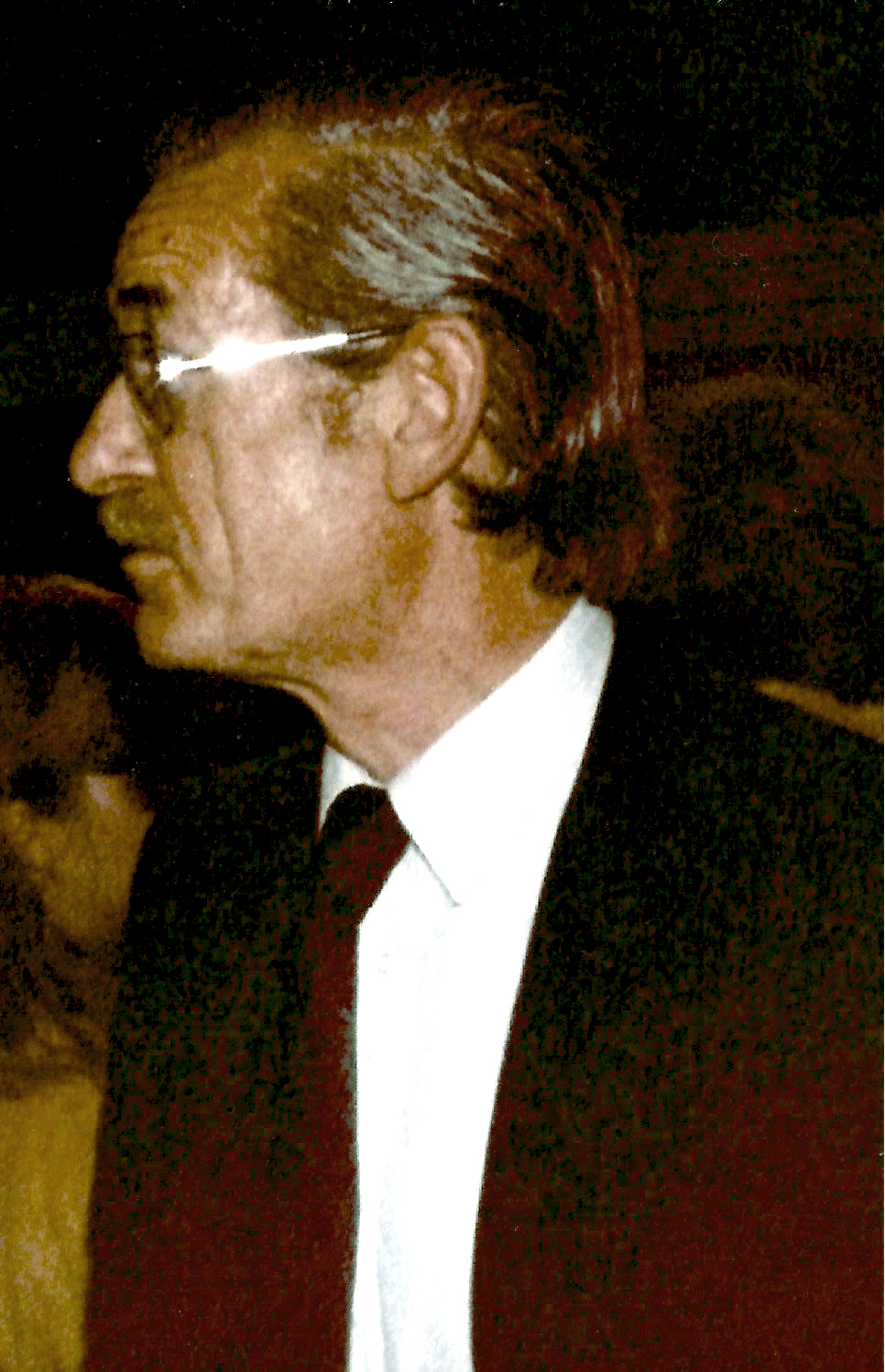
Close Hergé-collaborator and magazine contributor Bob de Moor

A lot of the publishers and artists who had managed to continue working during the occupation were accused of being collaborators and were imprisoned after the liberation by the reinstated national authorities on the insistence of the former French resistance, although most were released soon afterwards without charges being pressed. For example, this happened to one of the famous magazines, Cœurs Vaillants. It was founded by Abbot Courtois (under the alias Jacques Coeur) in 1929. As he had the backing of the church, he managed to publish the magazine throughout the war, and was charged with being a collaborator. After he was forced out, his successor Pihan (as Jean Vaillant) took up the publishing, moving the magazine in a more humorous direction. Likewise, Hergé was another artist who also found himself on the receiving end of similar accusations of the former Belgian resistance. He managed to clear his name and went on to create Studio Hergé in 1950, where he acted as a sort of mentor for the assistants that it attracted. Among the people who worked there were Bob de Moor, Jacques Martin and Roger Leloup, all of whom exhibit the easily recognisable Belgian ligne claire (clean line style), often opposed to the "Marcinelle school" style (named for the seat of Spirou publisher Dupuis), mostly proposed by authors from Spirou magazine such as Franquin, Peyo and Morris. In 1946, Hergé also founded the weekly Tintin magazine, which quickly gained enormous popularity, like the weekly Spirou appearing in a Dutch version under the name Kuifje for the Flemish and Dutch markets. Notable Belgian comic artists who at a later point in time achieved fame while working for Tintin magazine included among others William Vance, the aforementioned Greg, Tibet and Hermann Huppen.

Tintin magazine publisher Les Éditions du Lombard (as of 1989 simply: Le Lombard) was especially founded by Raymond Leblanc for the magazine's launch in conjuncture with Hergé as the latter could not find a publisher due to the fact that he was at that time still under investigation for alleged collaboration. Remarkably, album publications of the creations from the early group of artists centred around Hergé was, then and now, outsourced to longstanding Tintin book publisher Casterman, while Lombard itself only started album publications for those artist who joined the magazine at a later point in time. Nonetheless, with Lombard Francophone Europe had received its first specialised comics publisher actually conceived as such. Le Lombard went on to become one of the three great Belgian publishing houses to produce comics in French (and in Dutch as well for that matter due to the bi-lingual nature of the country), alongside Dupuis and Casterman, and like them as of 2017 still in existence.

Many other magazines did not survive the war: Le Petit Vingtième had disappeared, Le Journal de Mickey only returned in 1952. In the second half of the 1940s many new magazines appeared, although in most cases they only survived for a few weeks or months. The situation stabilised around 1950 with Spirou and the new Tintin magazine (with the team focused around Hergé) as the most influential and successful magazines for the next decade.

Yet, 1944 (both France and Belgium were liberated before war's end) had already seen the start of the industry career of the French-Belgian Jean-Michel Charlier, in the process becoming one of its most towering figures. That year and a lawyer by trade, Charlier joined the newly formed comic syndication agency World Press of Georges Troisfontaines, Belgium's answer to King Features Syndicate. Originally hired as an editorial draughtsman, Troisfontaines recognised Charlier's talent for writing and persuaded him to switch from drawing to scripting comics, something Charlier did with great success for the remainder of his life, creating close to three dozen series, several of them becoming classics of the Franco-Belgian BD. Spirou magazine became the agency's first and foremost client, and the first post-war decade saw the infusion into the magazine with many new series from young, predominantly Belgian talents like Eddy Paape, Victor Hubinon, Mitacq, Albert Weinberg, instituting an era in which Jijé's career truly took off with his best-known creation, the Western comic series Jerry Spring, that started its run in Spirou in March 1954. Jijé incidentally, had magazine tenure, but closely cooperated with the World Press artists before embarking on his own creation. Successful series Charlier himself created in this period were the educational short series Les Belles Histoires de l'oncle Paul (serving as proving ground in order to develop the talents and skills of young aspiring artists like Belgians Mitacq, Arthur Piroton, Hermann, Dino Attanasio and the Frenchman Jean Graton among others, several of whom switching over to industry competitor Lombard at a later point in their careers, most notably Hermann), Buck Danny (with Hubinon), La Patrouille des Castors (with Mitacq after his apprenticeship on L'oncle Paul) and Jean Valhardi (with Paape and Jijé). Aside from being a very prolific comic script writer, becoming his trademark henceforth, Charlier also became an editorial driving force and spokesperson for the agency, because of his background in law and his assertive personality. As such, he was responsible for introducing the two Frenchmen René Goscinny (who also starting out his comics career at the agency) and former Bravo artist Albert Uderzo to each other in 1951 at the in that year opened Paris, France, office of World Press, in the process creating one of Franco-Belgium's most successful BD partnerships. One of the first comics both men created together in the employ of the agency was the in colonial French-Canada era set Western series Oumpah-pah, which was already conceived as loose gags in 1951, but failed to find a magazine publisher. Reworked into complete stories, the comic became successful in Tintin magazine in the period 1958–1962 (and thus, alongside Martin's The Adventures of Alix, one of the first purely French comics to appear in the Belgian magazine), effectively becoming the "spiritual father" of their later Asterix creation.

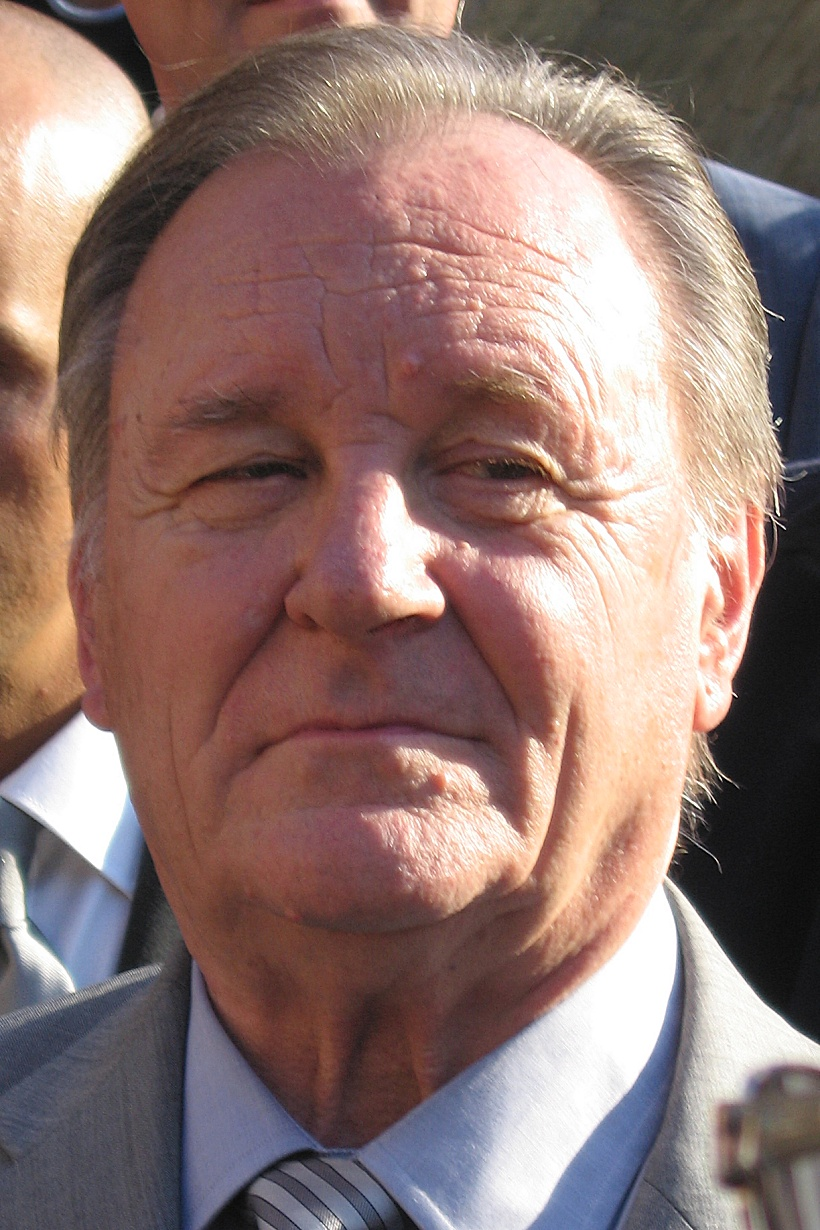
Uderzo (Brussels, September 2005)

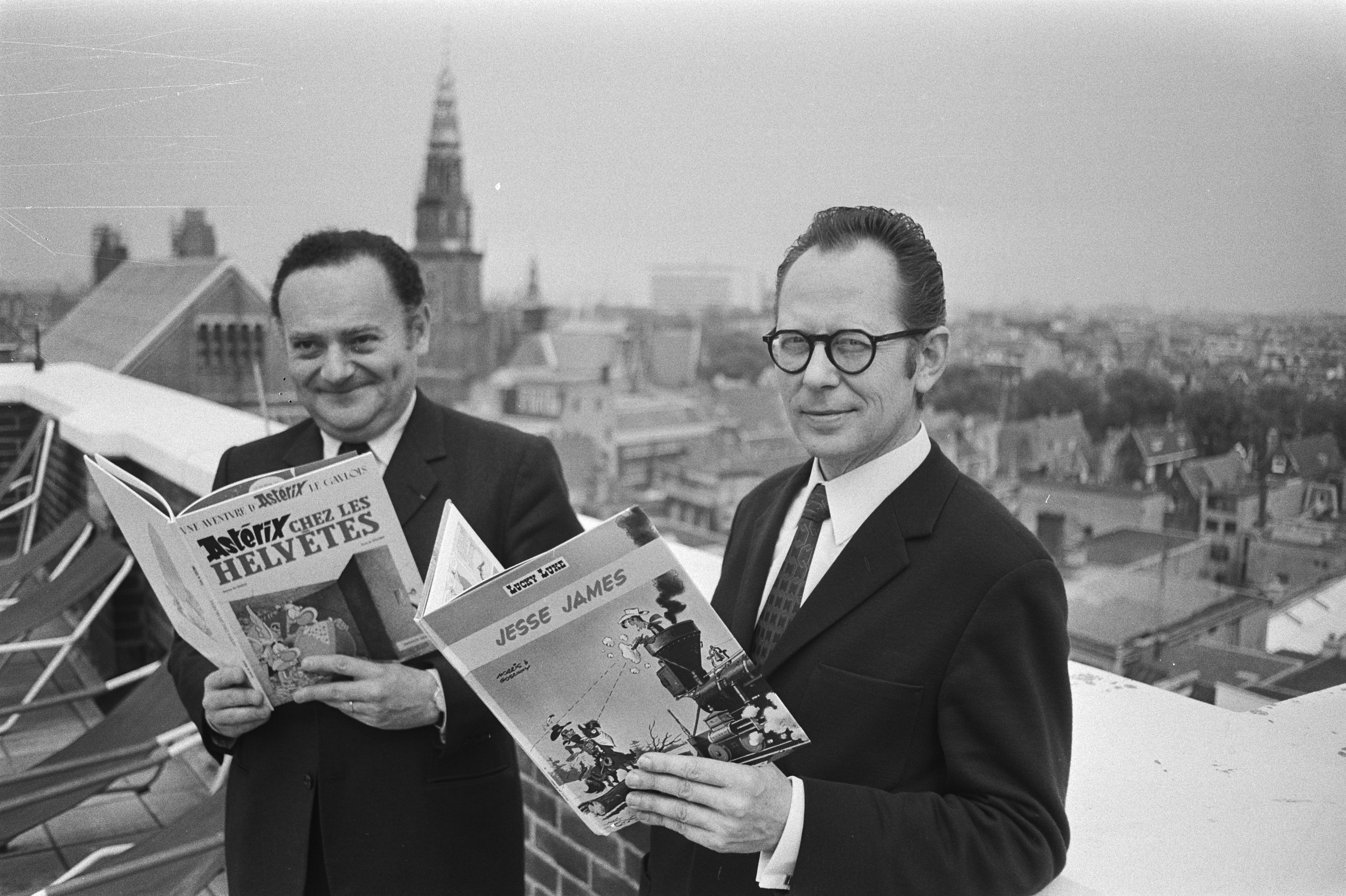
Goscinny (left) & Morris (Amsterdam, May 1971)

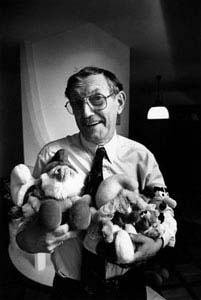
Peyo (1990)

But it were not just the artists contracted by World Press who infused Spirou with its new elan, Dupuis itself had contracted a group of artists who were as much responsible for its success and then some as it was this group that defined the rejuvenated magazine in the post-war era. Upon war's end three artists from the defunct animation studio CBA were hired by Dupuis as staff artists for Spirou, Eddy Paape (before he switched over to World Press), André Franquin and Maurice "Morris" De Bevere, and it was Morris who created in 1946 the second one of the great Franco-Belgian comic classics, Lucky Luke, which made it first appearance in the Almanach appendix issue of 7 December 1946. Franquin was passed the comic Spirou et Fantasio by his mentor Jijé, who himself had taken over the series from original creator Rob-Vel in the war years, and it was Franquin who provided the series with its popularity, before he embarked for the magazine on his most popular creation Gaston in 1957. With the addition of artist Willy "Will" Maltaite, who took over the series Tif et Tondu from original creator Fernand Dineur, the group that became known as "La bande des quatre" (Gang of 4), consisting of Jijé, Franquin, Morris and Will, was complete and constituted the foundation of what was dubbed the "Marcinelle school" style. However, such was the success of these artists, that the work of pre-war artists Rob-Vel and Dineur, was eclipsed by that of the younger generation, causing them to slide into oblivion. In 1952, another future great working in the Marcinelle school tradition was added to Spirou, artist Pierre "Peyo" Culliford upon introduction by Franquin. Peyo was actually a former colleague of Franquin at CBA, but was at the time of the demise of the animation studio not considered by Dupuis because of his young age. For Spirou Peyo continued with the series Johan and Peewit, which he had already started in 1947 for the Belgian newspapers La Dernière Heure and Le Soir. It was this series that in 1957 spawned another of the great Franco-Belgian comic classics, The Smurfs. (Note: French: Les Schtroumpfs) With both magazines firmly in place, it was the success of Spirou and Tintin that initiated what many fans and scholars consider the golden age of the (Franco-)Belgian comic. As a result, the US comics didn't come back in as great a volume as before in both Belgium and France after the war, but in the case of France not for want of popularity, quite the contrary actually.

==== The bande dessinée under siege in post-war France ====
In France, a 1949 law about publications intended for the youth market was partly written by the French Communist Party, a major political force in France directly after the war (because of their highly successful and effective resistance in the war years), to actually exclude most of the US publications. The law, called "Loi du 16 juillet 1949 sur les publications destinées à la jeunesse" ("Law of July 16th 1949 on Publications Aimed at the Youth") and passed in response to the post-liberation influx of US comics, was invoked as late as 1969 to prohibit the comic magazine Fantask —which featured translated versions of Marvel Comics stories — after seven issues. The formal and official justification for the law was the legislative desire to protect the youth of France from the perfidious and corruptive influence perceived to permeate foreign comics, especially in regard to violence and sexuality, the US ones in particular (even though they were not mentioned by name in the law), and in this the French law actually foreshadowed the 1954 publication of the comic condemning treatise Seduction of the Innocent by Fredric Wertham in the United States itself. But there was an equally important, but unofficial, reason for the law as well; US comics were doing so well in post-liberation France, that native comic magazines, particularly the Catholic ones, became threatened in their very existence, and the law therefore became concurrently a veiled market protection mechanism. An added sense of urgency was, besides the huge popularity the US magazines enjoyed among France's youth, that the native publications had at that time a distinct disadvantage over their US counterparts as the country still experienced a serious post-war paper shortage (reflected as such in the poor paper quality, relatively low page count and lower circulation numbers of the native magazines of that era), something the higher quality US ones did not suffer from, they receiving preferential treatment under the Marshall Plan. The first targeted US comic for example, Tarzan, enjoyed a weekly circulation of 300,000 copies, twice the one Cœurs Vaillants had and dwarfing the 76,000 copy circulation of Tintin, and it was but one of the many US comics published in France in the immediate post-war era. It was the very reason for the unlikely French Catholic-Communist alliance in this regard, and a very effective one at that as US comics all but disappeared from the French comic scene for the time being, the Le Journal de Mickey excepted, which only reappeared three years later in former occupied western Europe.

It was not just US productions which were prohibited under the law, several Belgian French-language comic creations of the era also fell victim to the scrutiny of the oversight committee charged with upholding the law for varying reasons, as stipulated in its rather sweeping article 2 (presently article 3), which allowed for almost at will prohibition of comics for reasons that suited the policies of any French government in power at any given time. A famous example concerned the two Korean War volumes of the popular aviation comic series Buck Danny, created by Belgians Charlier (who as spokesperson for World Press/Spirou was actually summoned to appear in person for a board of inquiry at the French Ministry of Information to account for himself) and Hubinon, which were prohibited in 1954 as article 2 expressly forbade any mentioning of an actual, current armed conflict in a children's publication – but also because communist members of the commission had issues with the strong anticommunist sentiment expressed in the comic according to writer Charlier. Both volumes remained prohibited in France until 1969, though French fans on holiday in Belgium, Switzerland or Luxembourg could pick up the albums unhindered over there. The law also came in handy to somewhat regulate – though not prohibiting – the availability in France of Belgian magazines like Spirou (which actually came close to prohibition however, as the Korean War stories were serialised in the magazine, but which was narrowly averted at the eleventh hour by Charlier) and Tintin in favor of the native Catholic magazines, after the conservatives had reasserted their political predominance in the country during the 1950s.

Rigorously enforced by the government oversight committee Commission de surveillance et de contrôle des publications destinées à l'enfance et à l'adolescence ('Committee in Charge of Surveillance and Control over Publications Aimed at Children and Adolescents'), particularly in the 1950s and the first half of the 1960s, the law turned out to be a stifling influence on the post-war development of the French comic world until the advent of Pilote magazine and more specifically the May 1968 social upheaval. Legally, the Commission had no punitive powers, only advisory ones, but in practice Charlier begged to differ. The all powerful Commission, shielded by the Justice Ministry (which was the punitive authority, but who took any and all Commission recommendations at face value, no questions asked), convened on a weekly basis, sifting through publications and weeding out those they felt subject to prohibition under the law, every decision they took being final, under no obligation to ever provide any formal justification whatsoever and without any possibility for appeal, which amounted to de facto state censorship according to Charlier.

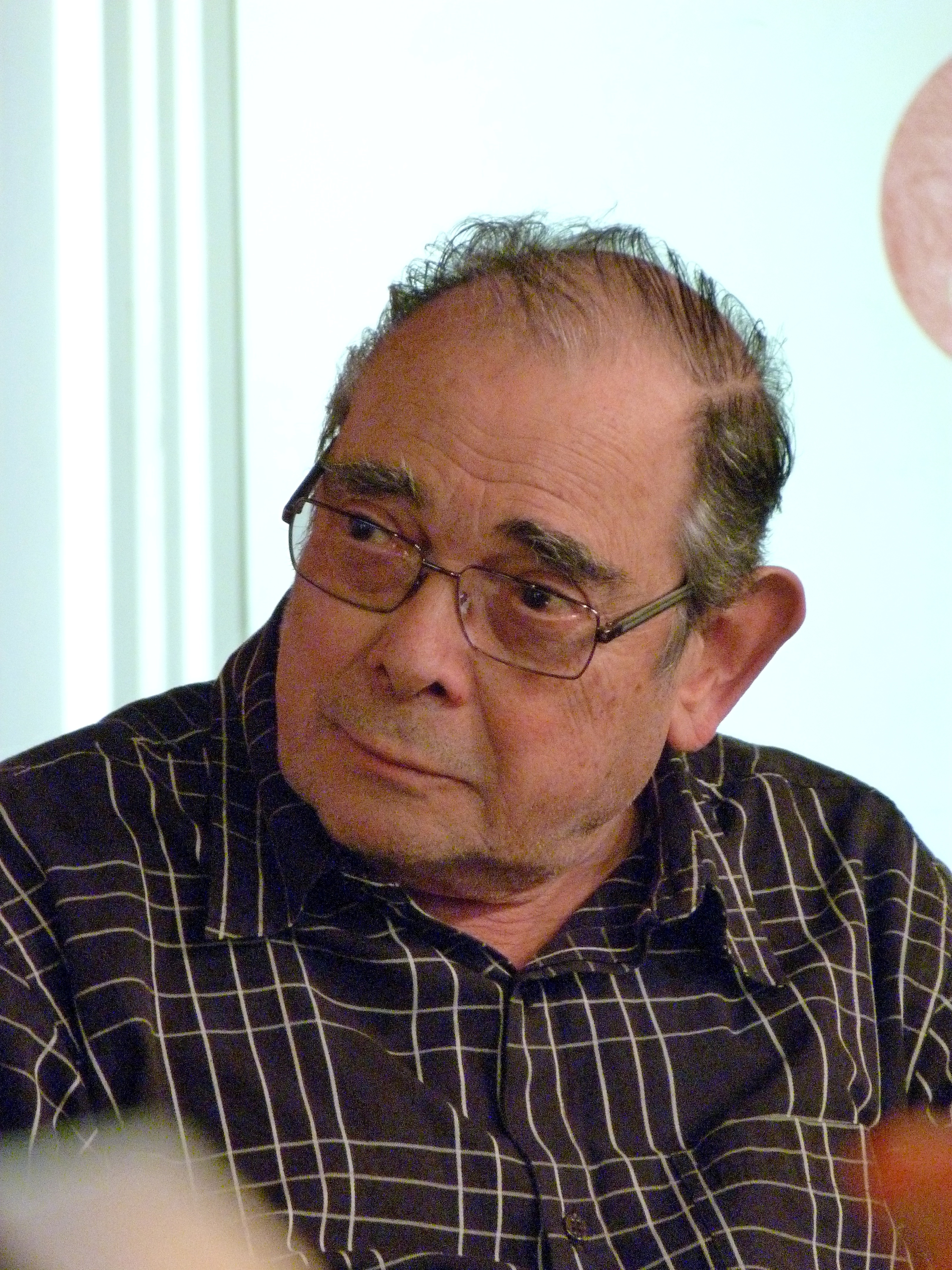
Marcel Gotlib (2011)

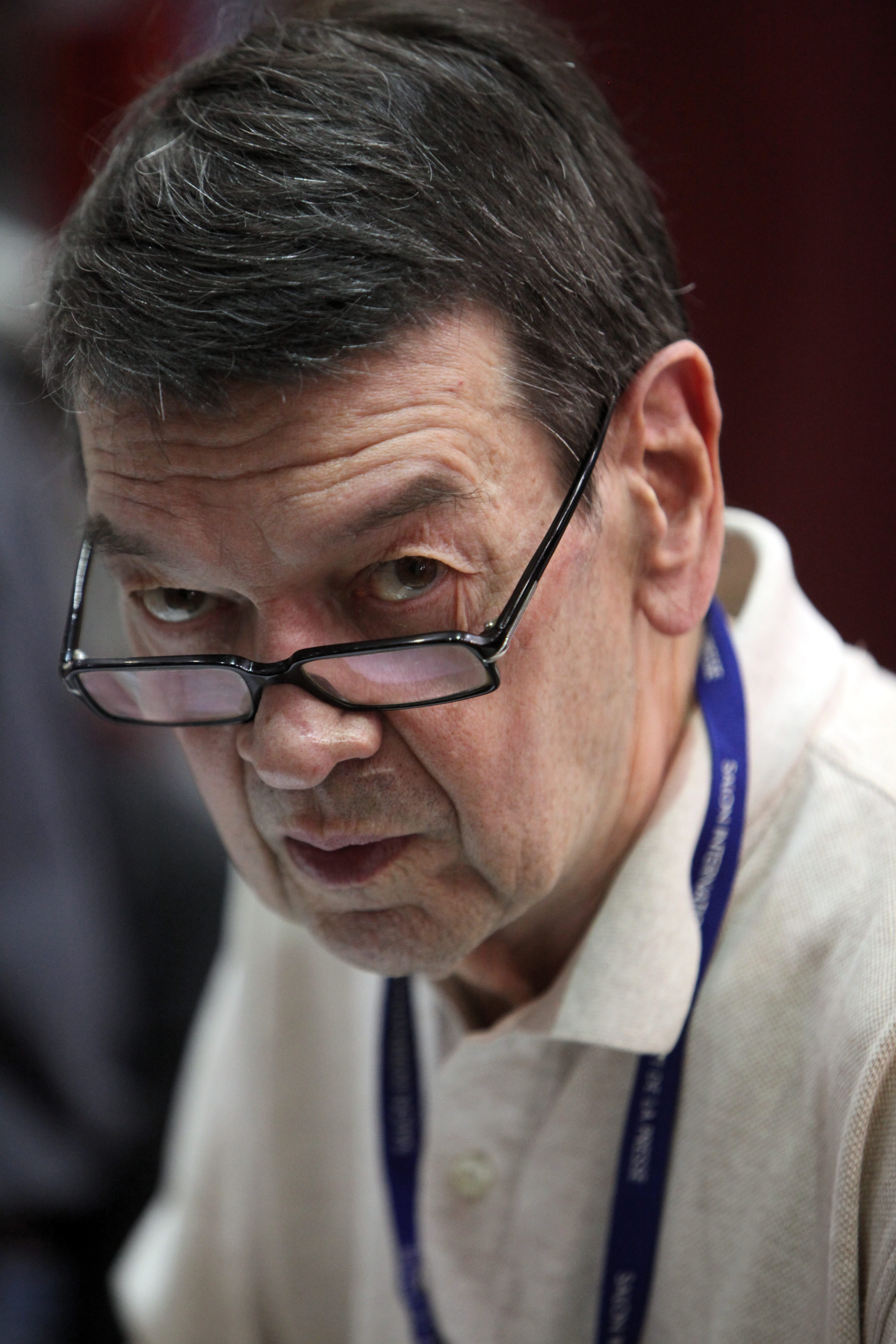
Nikita Mandryka (2011)

Members of an early generation of French artists who created modern comics without Belgian tutelage

Yet, it were also the communists who provided the comic scene in France with a single bright-spot; Having its origins in the communist wartime underground resistance publications, the comic magazine Vaillant (not to be confused with the two near-similarly named Fleurus publications) was launched in 1945 upon war's end. The secular magazine provided a platform for predominantly native comic talent born between the 1920s and the 1940s, not able or willing to work for the Catholic magazines, to showcase their work. French names of note who started out their career in the magazine were among others Nikita Mandryka, Paul Gillon, Jean-Claude Forest and Marcel Gotlib, and were less beholden to what was then still the Belgian bande dessinée tradition, other native contemporaries were – in essence ranking among the first native French artists to provide the "Franco" element in what later would become the "Franco-Belgian comics" expression, with comic artist Marijac having been a trailblazer. Marijac actually started out for Cœurs Vaillants in the 1930s, but distanced himself from the magazine directly after the liberation, when he started the secular comics magazine Coq hardi (1944–1963), France's first recognisable modern BD magazine. Marijac himself became a prolific figure of note in the French comic scene of the 1950s as co-editor and contributor for a series of native comic magazines other than his own Coq Hardi, and conceived in the era under the shadow of the all-present Catholic publications to fill the void left by the banned US comics such as Les Grandes Séries Internationales, Cricri Journal, Mireille, Ouest-Magazine, Nano et Nanette, Héros du Far West, Frimousse, Cocorico and Allez-France, all of which filled with work from French artists, now forgotten save Marijac himself (who was honoured for his efforts at the 1979 Angoulême comics festival with its most prestigious award), along with the magazines they created their work for.

It has been observed that, unlike the Belgian publications, these mostly secular native magazines were largely left alone by the Commission de Surveillance, save for one notable exception; Pierre Mouchot, creator and editor of US inspired comic magazines in the immediate post-war era, was on recommendation of the Commission persecuted for his likewise US (and Italian) inspired comic series Big Bill le Casseur and P’tit Gars, having to appear in court no less than eight times in the period 1950 - 1954, actually winning most of his cases in the lower courts. And even though he and his creations are both in equal measure forgotten, Mouchot became the only French comics artist ever to be legally persecuted, and ultimately convicted by the highest court of appeal (though only receiving symbolic punishment) under article 2 of the 1949 law for real. However, the conviction did serve as an effective deterrent for other native artists – and thus firmly establishing the Commission as a force to be reckoned with, even though they had a tough time becoming so as Mouchot kept winning his lower court cases – who continued to create their comics while erring on the side of caution for the next decade. It is in this light that some of the other early French contemporary greats, such as Martin, Graton, Uderzo, and his writing partner Goscinny opted to start out their careers for Belgian comic publications, neither wanting to submit themselves to the scrutiny of the Commission de Surveillance directly, nor wanting to work for either the Catholic or communist magazines for personal reasons.

The situation in Belgium was nowhere near as restrictive as it was in France. Catholics, who were the dominant factor in politics in the country as well at the time, did not have to contend with the negligible influence of the communists, contrary to their French counterparts. There was actually no need perceived for regulating measures in Belgium as US productions, contrary to France, were already supplanted in popularity by the native comics (aided by the fact that Belgium had not seen the massive influx of US comics in the same measure France had, as Belgium had been predominantly liberated by British and Canadian forces, whose soldiers did not bring along their comics in the same volume the USs did), whereas the majority of Belgian comics artists were either Catholics themselves (or at least sympathetic to the faith) such as Jijé (whose early realistic works were deeply steeped in the faith), or had, like Hergé did, strong ties with the as "healthy" considered scouting movement – a significant presence in Belgian society at the time, which also explains the contemporary popularity of Charlier's La patrouille des Castor series in Belgium, which was centred around a scouting chapter – and were thus, to use the modern expression, already "politically correct" in the first place, that is from the Belgian perspective at least. However, the incident Charlier had experienced with the Commission shook up the editors of Spirou and Tintin, and as France was a too important market to lose, they too henceforth chose to err on the side of caution by screening the creations of their artists before magazine publication, essentially being forced by the French to exercise self-censorship. Having already embarked on their divergent evolutionary path, Flemish comics escaped this kind of scrutiny, as they were at the time rarely, if at all, translated into French.

=== 1959–1974: Scale tips to France ===
In 1959, the influential French weekly Pilote launched, already from the start an attempt to be a more mature alternative to Spirou and Pilote, aimed at a teenage audience, with the "Asterix" series as an almost instantaneous success. The audience radicalised at a faster pace than the editors, however, which had trouble keeping up. The French satire magazine Hara-Kiri was launched, also aimed at an adult audience.

In the 1960s, most of the French Catholic magazines, such as the Fleurus publications, waned in popularity, as they were "re-Christianised" and went to a more traditional style with more text and fewer drawings. This meant that in France, magazines like Pilote and Vaillant (relaunched as Pif gadget in 1969), and Spirou and Tintin for French-speaking Belgium, gained almost the entire market and became the obvious goal for new artists from their respective countries, who took up the styles prevalent in those magazines to break into the business.

With a number of publishers in place, including Dargaud (Pilote), Le Lombard (Tintin), and Dupuis (Spirou), three of the biggest influences for over 50 years, the market for domestic comics had reached (commercial) maturity. In the following decades, magazines like Spirou, Tintin, Vaillant (relaunched as Pif Gadget in 1969), Pilote, and Heroïc-Albums (the first to feature completed stories in each issue, as opposed to the episodic approach of other magazines) would dominate the market. At this time, the French creations had already gained fame throughout Europe, and many countries had started importing the comics in addition to—or as substitute for—their own productions.

=== 1974–1990: France becomes preeminent ===
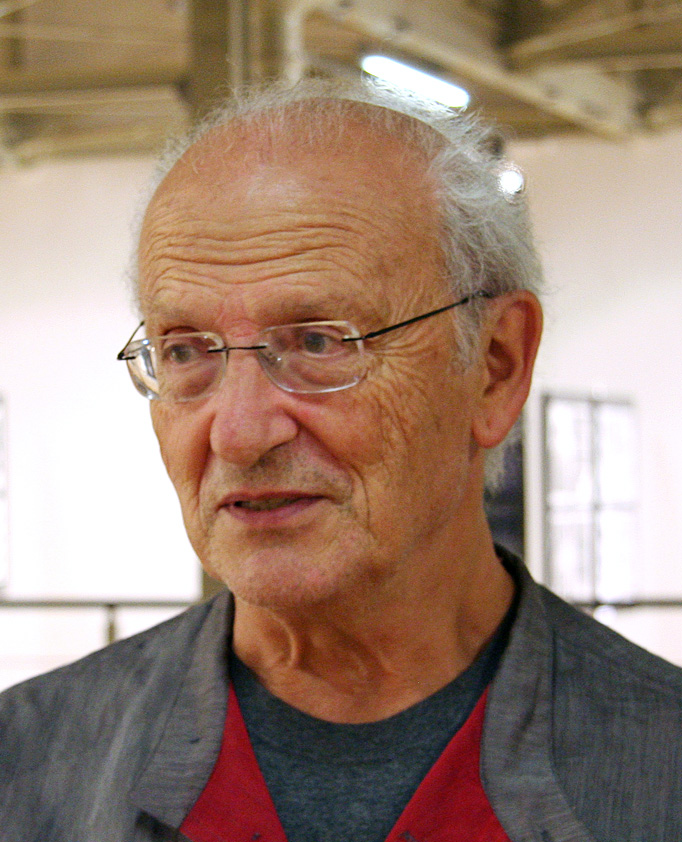
BD artist Mœbius (2008), who achieved international fame through Métal Hurlant

The aftermath of the May 1968 social upheaval brought many mature – as in aimed at an adult readership – BD magazines, something that had not been seen previously and virtually all of them of purely French origin, which was also indicative of France rapidly becoming the preeminent force in the (continental) European BD world, eventually usurping the position the Belgians held until then. L'Écho des Savanes (from new publisher Éditions du Fromage, founded by Pilote defectors Nikita Mandryka, Claire Bretécher, and Marcel Gotlib), with Gotlib's pornography watching deities and Bretécher's Les Frustrés ('The Frustrated Ones'), and Le Canard Sauvage ('The Wild Duck/Mag'), an art-zine featuring music reviews and BDs, were among the earliest. Following suit was Métal Hurlant (vol. 1: December 1974 – July 1987 also from a new French publisher Les Humanoïdes Associés, founded by likewise Pilote defectors, Druillet, Jean-Pierre Dionnet, and Mœbius) with the far-reaching science fiction and fantasy of Mœbius, Druillet, and Bilal. Its translated counterpart made an impact in the US as Heavy Metal. This trend continued during the seventies, until the original Métal Hurlant folded in the early eighties, living on only in the US edition, which soon had an independent development from its French-language parent. Nonetheless, it were these publications and their artists which are generally credited with the revolutionising and emancipation of the Franco-Belgian BD world. As indicated, most of these early adult magazines were established by former Pilote BD artists, who had left the magazine to break out on their own, after they had staged a revolt in the editorial offices of Dargaud, the publisher of Pilote, during the 1968 upheaval, demanding and ultimately receiving more creative freedom from then editor-in-chief René Goscinny (see also: "Jean "Mœbius" Giraud on his part in the uprising at Pilote").

Essentially, these new magazines along with other contemporaries of their kind, were the French counterparts of the slightly earlier US underground comix, also conceived and popularised as a result of the counterculture of the 1960s, of which the French May 1968 events were only a part. But unlike their US counterparts, the French magazines were mainstream from the start when they eventually burst onto the scene in the early 1970s, as publications of this kind could not escape the scrutiny of the Commission de Surveillance prior to 1968, as editor François Cavanna of the satirical magazine Hara-Kiri (launched in 1960) had experienced several times to his detriment, having had to reinvent his magazine on several occasions. Aside from the creative aspects, the 1960s brought in effect another kind of freedom for French BD artists as well - commercial and financial freedom. Until the revolt in the offices of Pilote, artists worked in a studio system, namely a tenured exclusive working relationship at the magazine or publisher, with artists having little to no control over both commercial and creative aspects of their creations – except for a few artists who also held editorial offices at publishing houses such as Goscinny, Charlier and Greg, the former of which incidentally, having also been a major element for the revolt at Pilote. That changed as well after 1968, when more and more artists decided to ply their trade as free-lancers, the L'Écho des Savanes founders having been early pioneers in that respect, and has as of 2017 become the predominant artist-publisher relationship. While contracts tend to be long-term for specific series at a particular publisher, they no longer prevent artists, like the below-mentioned François Bourgeon and Hermann Huppen, to create other BDs for other publishers, sometimes even suspending a series for the one in favour of a series for the other.

The advent of the new adult magazines had a profound effect on France's hitherto most influential BD magazine Pilote. Editor-in-chief Goscinny had at first refused to implement the changes demanded by its artists during the 1968 revolt in the editorial offices, but he now found himself suddenly confronted with the magazine haemorrhaging its most promising BD talents and diminishing sales. The magazine was eventually turned into a monthly magazine, its artists who had not yet left given more creative freedoms and the Belgian influence terminated definitively with the departure of co-editor Charlier in 1972 and the last Belgian artists Hubinon and Jijé following suit a short time thereafter, transforming the magazine into a purely French one. However, while the magazine was now targeted at an older adolescent readership with stories featuring more mature themes, Goscinny stopped short of letting the magazine become a truly adult magazine. Yet, the magazine was unable to regain the dominant position it had held in the previous one-and-a-half decade, due to the flooding of the market with alternatives.

Two of the most important contributors to À Suivre

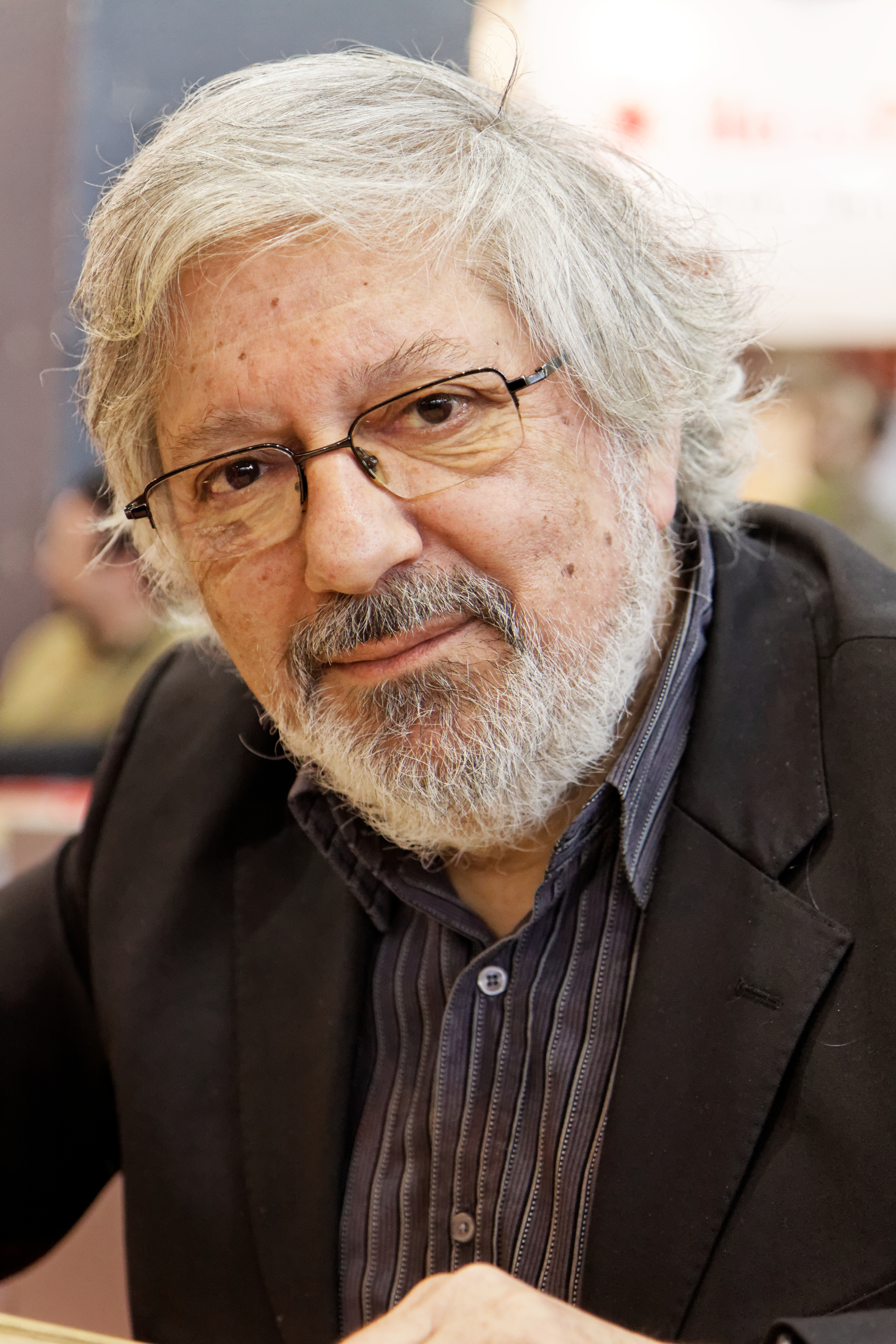
Frenchman Jacques Tardi (2013)

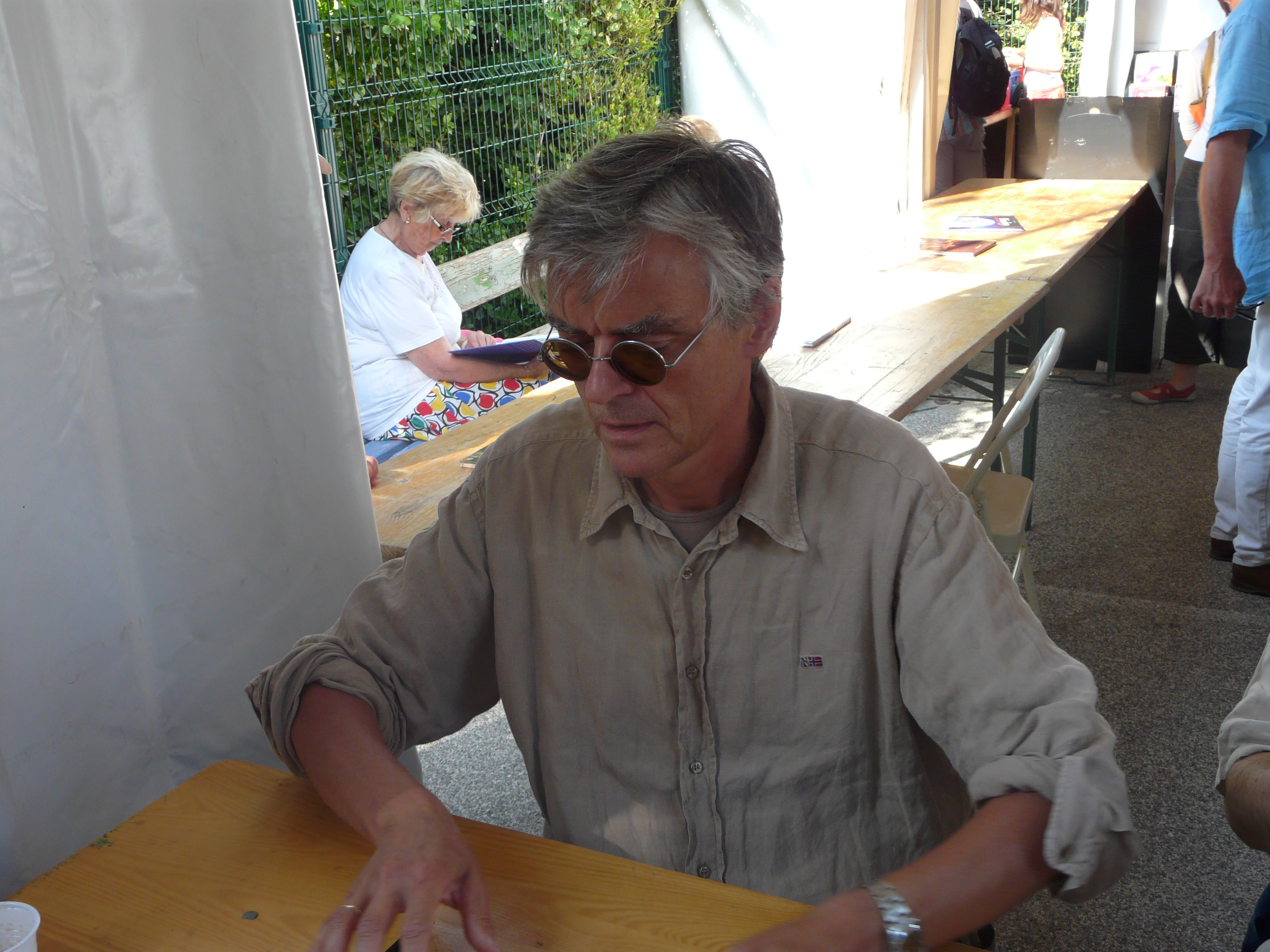
Belgian François Schuiten (2008)

Lagging behind the French for the first time in regard to the more mature BDs, the Belgians made good on their arrear when publisher Casterman launched the magazine À Suivre (Wordt Vervolgd for its Dutch-language counterpart, both titles meaning "To Be Continued") in October 1977. Until then the publisher had somewhat limited itself as the album publisher of Hergé's Tintin since 1934, expanded upon after the war with a couple of Hergé inspired creations by closely affiliated artists such as Jacques Martin, François Craenhals and the Danish C. & V. Hansen couple. It was with the specific intent to expand beyond the somewhat limited Hergé boundaries with other, more diverse high quality work, that the publisher launched (À Suivre), which printed BD creations by Ted Benoît, Jacques Tardi, Hugo Pratt, François Schuiten, Paul Teng and many others from French, Italian and/or Dutch origins, but relatively few from Belgian artists, with Schuiten, Didier Comès – as already stated, one of the very few BD artists of German-Belgian descent, alongside Hermann Huppen – and Jean-Claude Servais being three of the few exceptions. It was À Suivre that popularised the concept of the graphic novel – in French abbreviated as "Roman BD", "roman" being the translation for "novel" – as a longer, more adult, more literate and artistic BD in Europe. Unlike its Dupuis counterpart, and while their BD catalog has expanded considerably since then, Casterman has never evolved into a purely BD publisher by completely abandoning its book publishing roots, as it is currently also a prolific publisher of children's books.

Yet, it remained French publications and French artists who would continue to dominate the field from the late-1970s onward to this day, with such (sometimes short-lived) magazines as Bananas, Virus, Mormoil, the feminist Ah ! Nana, Casablanca and Fluide Glacial. It were in these such magazines that a younger, post-war generation of French BD artists like Yves Chaland, Édika and Philippe Foerster debuted, whereas veterans like Gotlib and Franquin found a home for their later, darker and more cynical work.

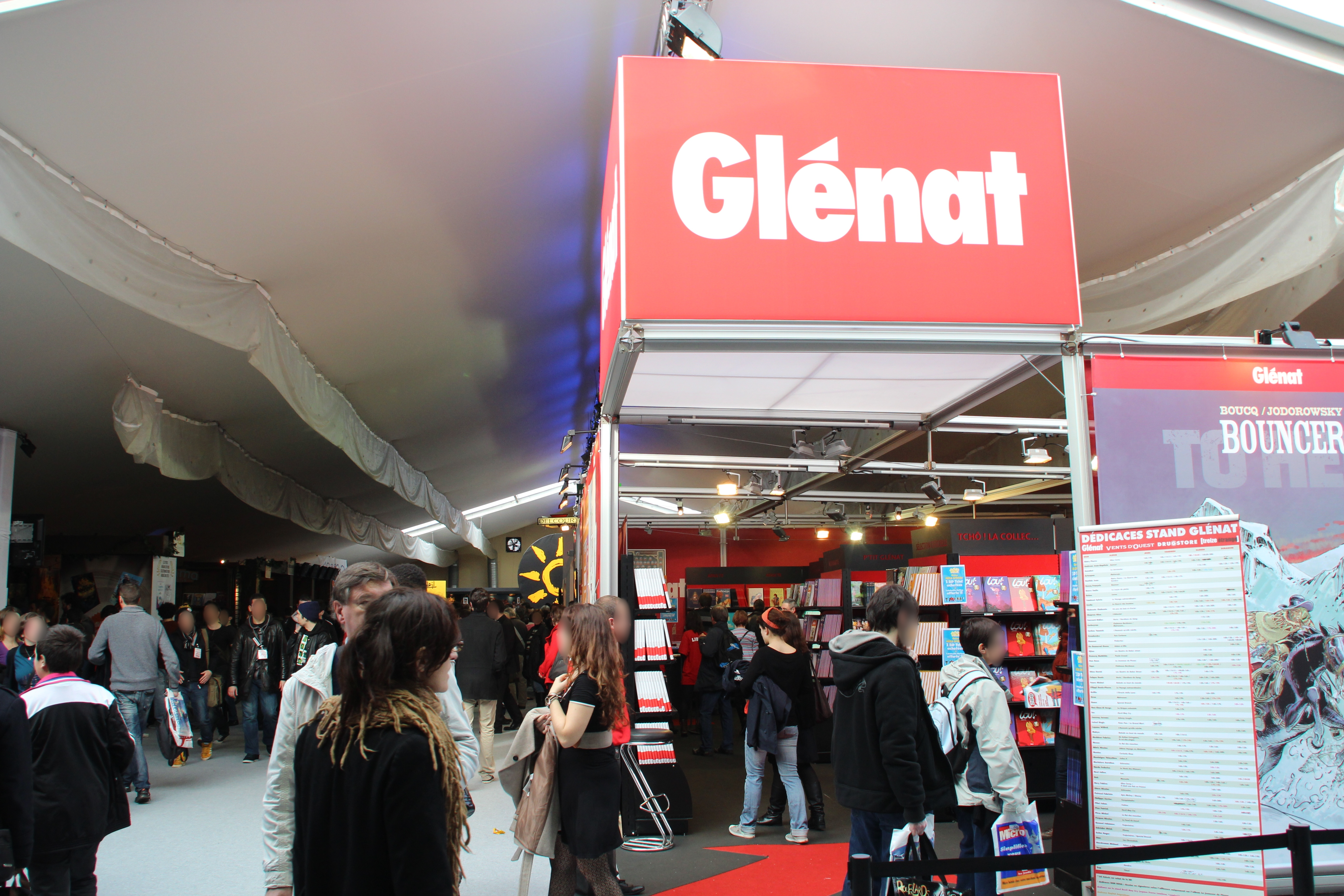
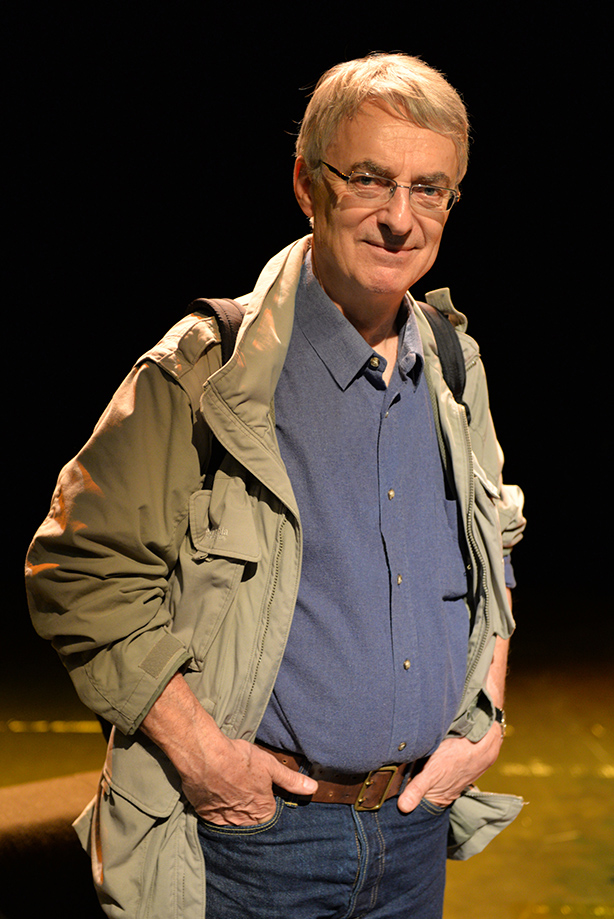
The Glénat booth at the 2013 Angoulême BD festival with on the right one of its most important early artists, François Bourgeon (2014), whose heroine Isa from Les Passagers du vent was exemplary of the new historical realism in Franco-Belgian BDs

A major player in the field became French publisher and newcomer Glénat Éditions (founded in 1972, and who actually started out publishing graphic novels directly as albums before the launch of Circus) with their two main magazine publications Circus (1975–1989) and Vécu (1985–1994, with emphasis on mature stories of an accurate historical nature), featuring predominantly the work of French BD talents, but who did so with a twist; Glénat targeted their magazines at a readership positioned between the adolescent readership of Pilote, Tintin and Spirou and the mature readership of such magazines as (À Suivre), Métal Hurlant and others. French BD artists of note who were nurtured into greatness in the Glénat publications were among others Mayko and Patrick Cothias, but most conspicuously François Bourgeon and André Juillard. Exemplary of the different, older target audience Glénat was aiming at, became the two finite, historical series Bourgeon created; Les Passagers du vent (1979–2009, The Passengers of the Wind, seven volumes, set in 18th-century seafaring and slave trading Europe, becoming one of the first BD series to deal realistically in considerable detail with the dark slavery chapter in human history) and Les Compagnons du crépuscule (1983–1989, 'Companions of the Dusk', three volumes, set in 13th-century Europe and published by Casterman). Both series made short work of any romantic notion about the two historic eras still lingering in anyone's subconscious because of imagery imbued upon them by 1940s–1960s Hollywood movie productions or Franco-Belgian bandes dessinées as published in Cœurs Vaillants, Tintin, or Spirou in the same era for that matter. Renowned for his meticulous research into the subject matter of the BD series he was creating, not seldom taking as long as it took him to create the series in question, Bourgeon depicted an historical reality devoid of any so-called "heroes", only featuring common people who were as often victimised as they were heroic, living in a world which was brutally hard while living a live which was therefore all too often very short for the common man, being habitually subjugated to the will of the powerful without any recourse whatsoever to objective justice, especially the women. Bourgeon however, made his harsh message to his readership palatable by his relatively soft art style and his optimistic view regarding human resilience. No such respite was afforded the reader however with Hermann's 11th-century epos The Towers of Bois-Maury (1984–1994, French: Les Tours de Bois-Maury), whose original ten-volume series was serialised in Vécu in the same era Bourgeon's Passagers was in Circus. Not only did Hermann's stark and uncompromising art style served to reinforce the grim atmosphere of his medieval settings, any and all redeeming optimistic commentary on human nature was also lacking in his narrative, quite the contrary actually, making his Middle Ages truly the Dark Ages where the vast majority of humanity was living short, violent lives in abject squalor, with not a single so-called "hero" in sight anywhere in his series. To hammer home the point, both artists had their mediaeval knights, around whom both narratives were centred, die violent deaths nowhere near the fulfilment of their respective quests, thereby reinforcing the futility of such endeavours. With such series driving home the point that real history is made by mere humans and not "super-humans", the Franco-Belgian historical BD had come a long way since their first romanticised and/or idealised appearances in the 1940s–1970s, particularly in Tintin and Pilote as portrayed by such artists as the Fred and Liliane Funcken couple (Le Chevalier blanc, Harald le Viking, Lieutenant Burton), William Vance (Howard Flynn, Rodric, Ramiro), François Craenhals (Chevalier Ardent) or Victor Hubinon (Barbe Rouge), to name but a few.

==== The bande dessinée becomes cultural heritage ====
Belgian Comic Strip Centre
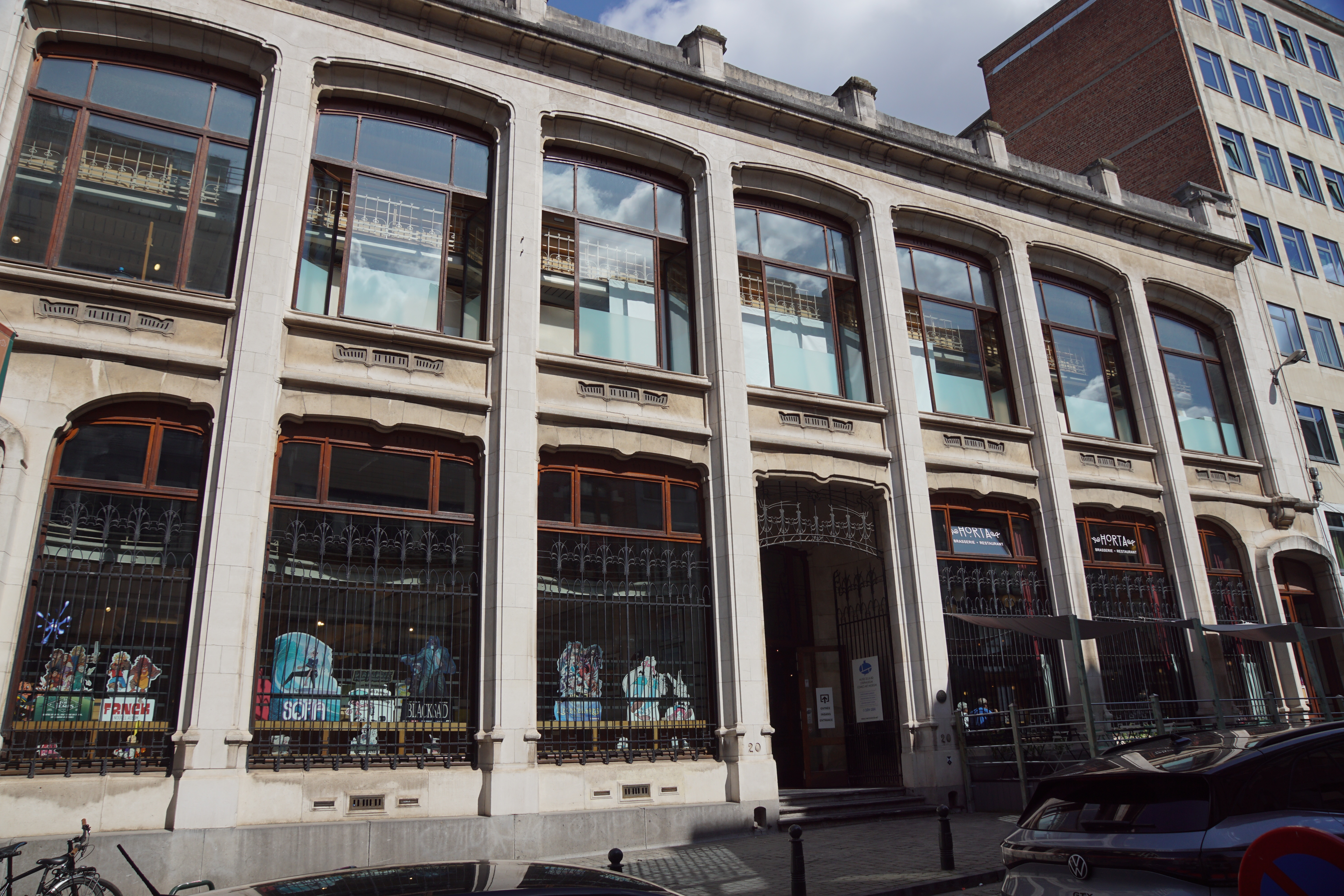
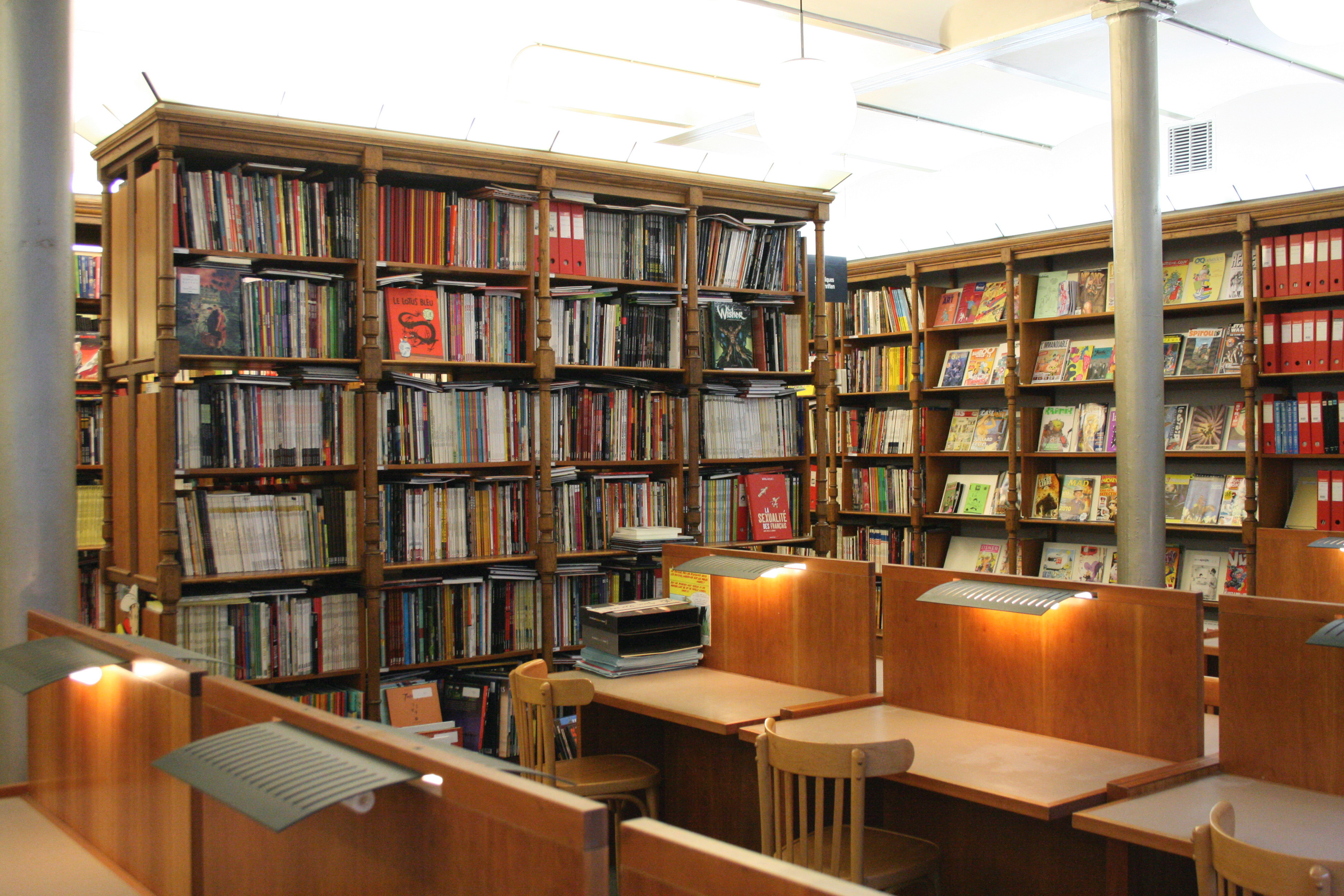
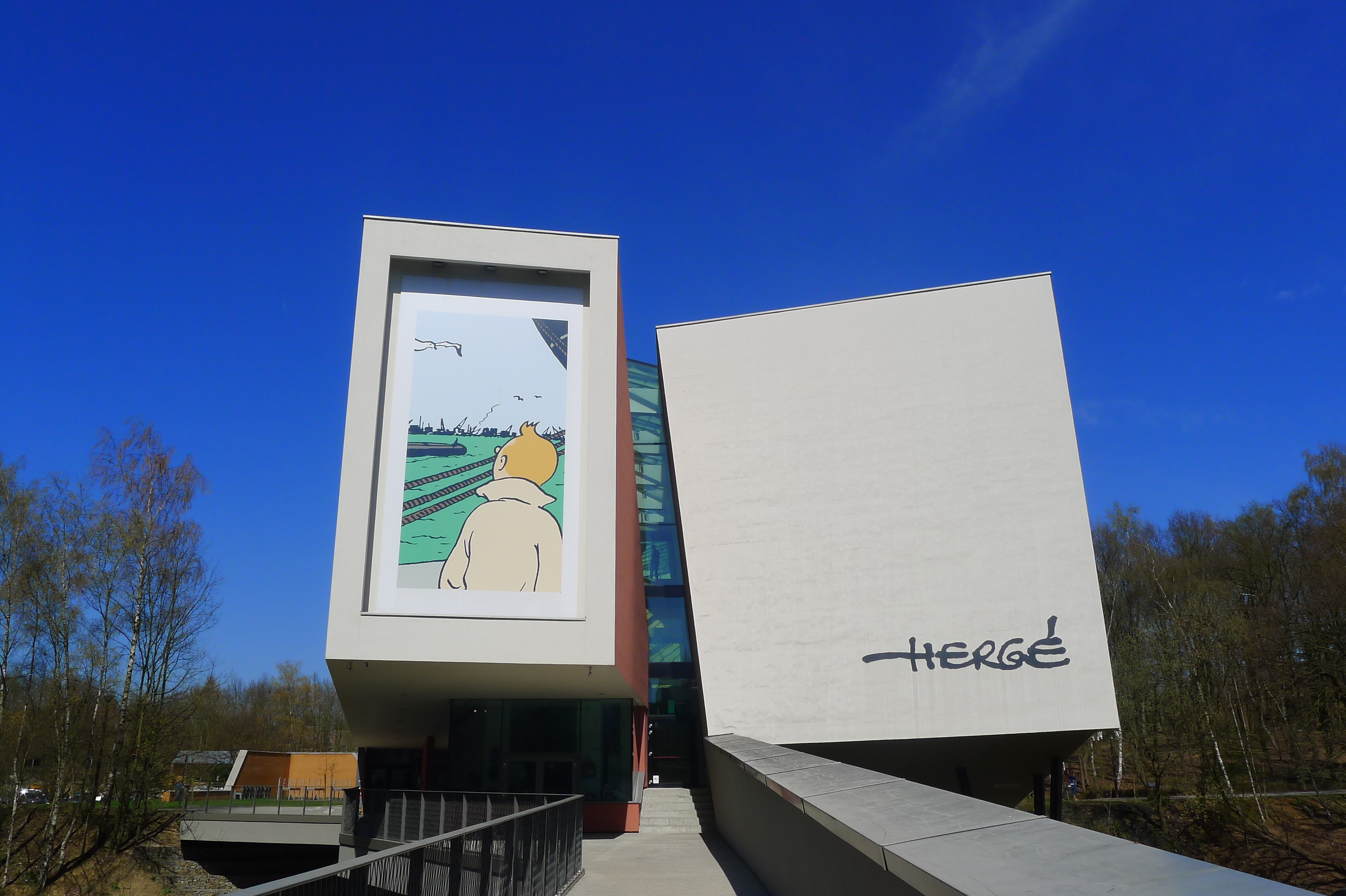
Facade and library, housed in a state-owned cultural heritage building, and the entrance of the specifically built Musée Hergé, both expressive of the state backing the Franco-Belgian BD receives in its native country

It was not just the BD scene these new publications and their artists changed, the perception of the medium in French society also changed radically in the 1970s–1980s, in stark contrast to the one it held in the 1940s–1950s. Recognising that the medium-advanced France's cultural status in the world, the cultural authorities of the nation started to aid the advancement of the medium as a bonafide art form, especially under the patronage of Minister of Culture Jack Lang, who had formulated his long-term Quinze mesures nouvelles en faveur de la Bande dessinée ('15 new measures in favour of the BD') ministry policy plan in 1982, which was updated and reaffirmed by a latter-day successor of Lang in 1997. It was consequently in the 1980s–1990s era that the medium achieved its formal status in France's Classification des arts (Classifications of the arts) as "Le Neuvième Art" ("the 9th art"), aside from becoming accepted as a mature part of French culture by Francophone society at large (in France and French-speaking Belgium it is as common to encounter grownup people reading BDs in public places, such as cafe terraces or public transportation, as it is people reading books, newspapers or magazines). Since then more than one BD artist have received "Ordre des Arts et des Lettres" civilian knighthoods, and these were not restricted to French nationals alone, as Japanese artist Jiro Taniguchi has also received one in 2011 for his efforts to merge the Franco-Belgian BD with the Japanese manga format (see below).

But it is however Jean "Mœbius" Giraud, called "the most influential bandes dessinées artist after Hergé" by several academic BD scholars, who is considered the premier French standard bearer of "Le Neuvième Art", as he has received two different civilian knighthoods with a posthumous rank elevation of his Arts and Letters knighthood to boot, an unicum for a BD artist and something the de facto inventor of the Franco-Belgian BD, Hergé, has never achieved even once, not even from his own native country Belgium (presumably because of the lingering impressions left by either the criticisms regarding his early Tintin stories, the post-war collaboration allegations, or both and neither of which he had ever managed to fully free himself from in his lifetime). Exemplary of Mœbius' standing in French culture, was the high-status, high-profile "Mœbius transe forme" exposition the prestigious Parisian Fondation Cartier pour l'Art Contemporain art museum organised from 2 October 2010 – 13 March 2011. As of 2017, it stands out as one of the largest exhibitions ever dedicated to the work of an individual BD artist by an official, state-sanctioned art museum – art as in art with a capital "A" – alongside the 20 December 2006 - 19 February 2007 Hergé exposition in the even more prestigious Centre Georges Pompidou modern art museum (likewise located in Paris and incidentally one of President Mitterrand's "Great Works") on the occasion of the centenary of that artist's birth. Giraud's funeral services in March 2012 was attended by a representative of the French nation in the person of Minister of Culture Frédéric Mitterrand, who also spoke on behalf of the nation at the services, and who was incidentally also the nephew of former President of France François Mitterrand, who had personally awarded Giraud with his first civilian knighthood in 1985, thereby becoming one of the first BD artists to be bestowed the honour. Giraud's death was a considerable media event in France, but ample attention was also given to his demise in press releases all around the world in even as faraway places like Indonesia (Jakarta Globe, 11 March 2012), a country not particularly known for a thriving comic culture. Yet, and despite the nation having embraced the BD, it should also be noted that both the law of 1949 and its oversight committee are as of 2025 still in existence, their legitimacy remaining as intact as it was in 1949. And while their impact and influence have significantly diminished in the wake of the events of 1968, their continued legal existence in the fringes does constitute the proverbial "Sword of Damocles" for the French BD world, despite artists, publishers, politicians and academics having questioned the relevance of both manifestations in a modern world in a public debate during a 1999 national conference organised on the subject by the Centre national de la bande dessinée et de l'image (CNBDI), France's largest and most important BD organisation.

Belgium, where the modern Franco-Belgian BD format was conceived after all, was somewhat slower in advancing the format as a bonafide art form, but has strongly followed suit in considering the Franco-Belgian BD as a "key aspect of Belgium's cultural heritage". While the expression "the 9th art" has been popularised in other countries as well, Belgium and France remain as of 2025, the only two countries worldwide where the medium has been accorded the formal status (when discounting the manga, which has achieved a near-similar, yet not quite identical status in native Japan), with its resultant strong backing from cultural authorities.

A visible manifestation of the latter has become the prestigious "Belgian Comic Strip Centre" (Dutch: Belgisch Centrum voor het Beeldverhaal, French: Centre belge de la Bande dessinée) established in 1989 in the Belgian capital Brussels, and which, as one of the largest BD museum in Europe, draws in 200,000 visitors annually. The museum is housed in a state-owned 1905 building designed by architect Victor Horta in the Art Nouveau style, the same style French female artist Annie Goetzinger has employed for her BDs. Belgium possesses two other, smaller, museums dedicated to individual BD artists, the Marc Sleen Museum (est. 2009), located across the street of the Comic Centre and dedicated to the work of the namesake Flemish BD creator, and, unsurprisingly, the especially built Musée Hergé (est. 2009) located in Louvain-la-Neuve, its interiors designed by Dutch BD artist Joost Swarte, who had worked in the Hergé tradition.

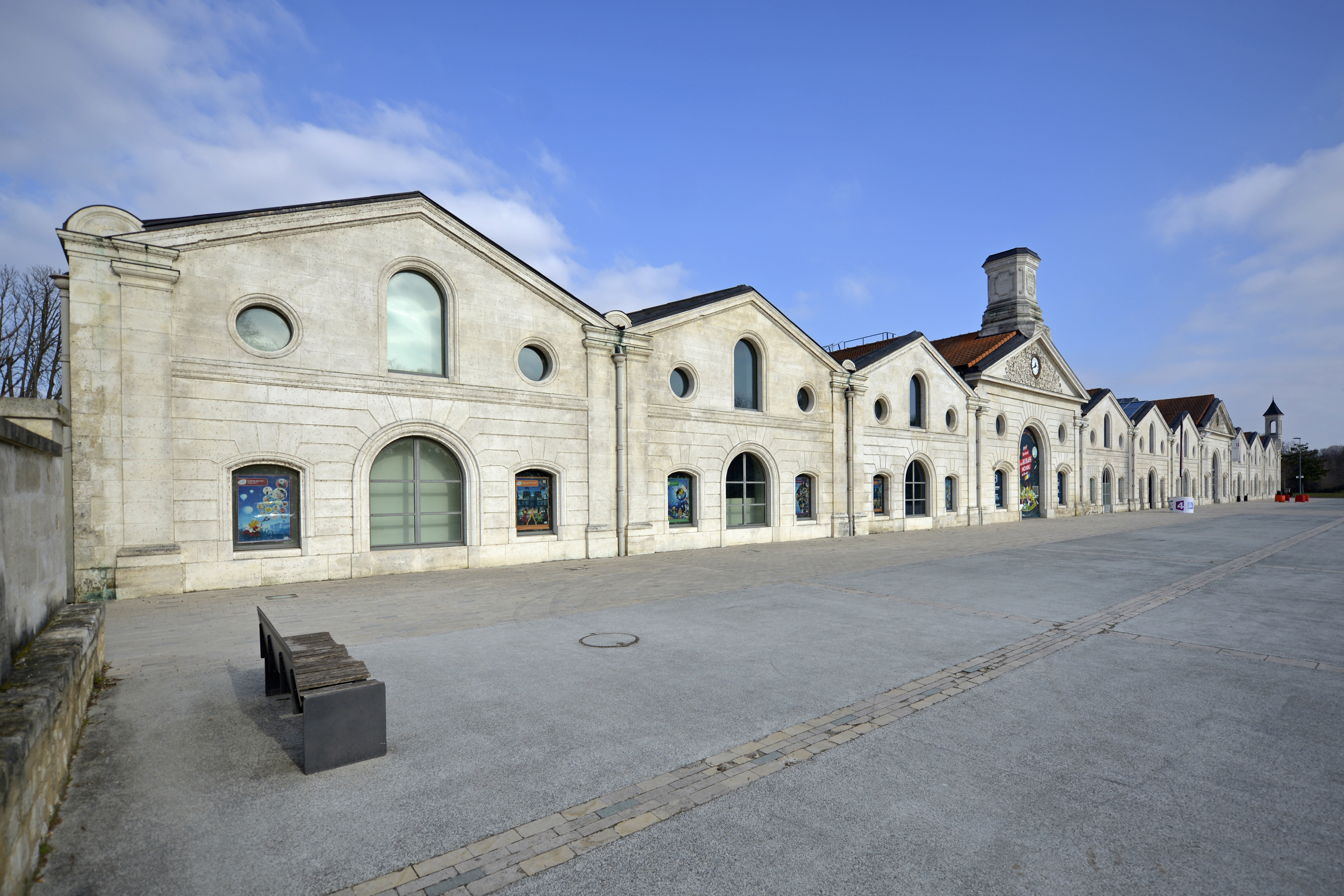
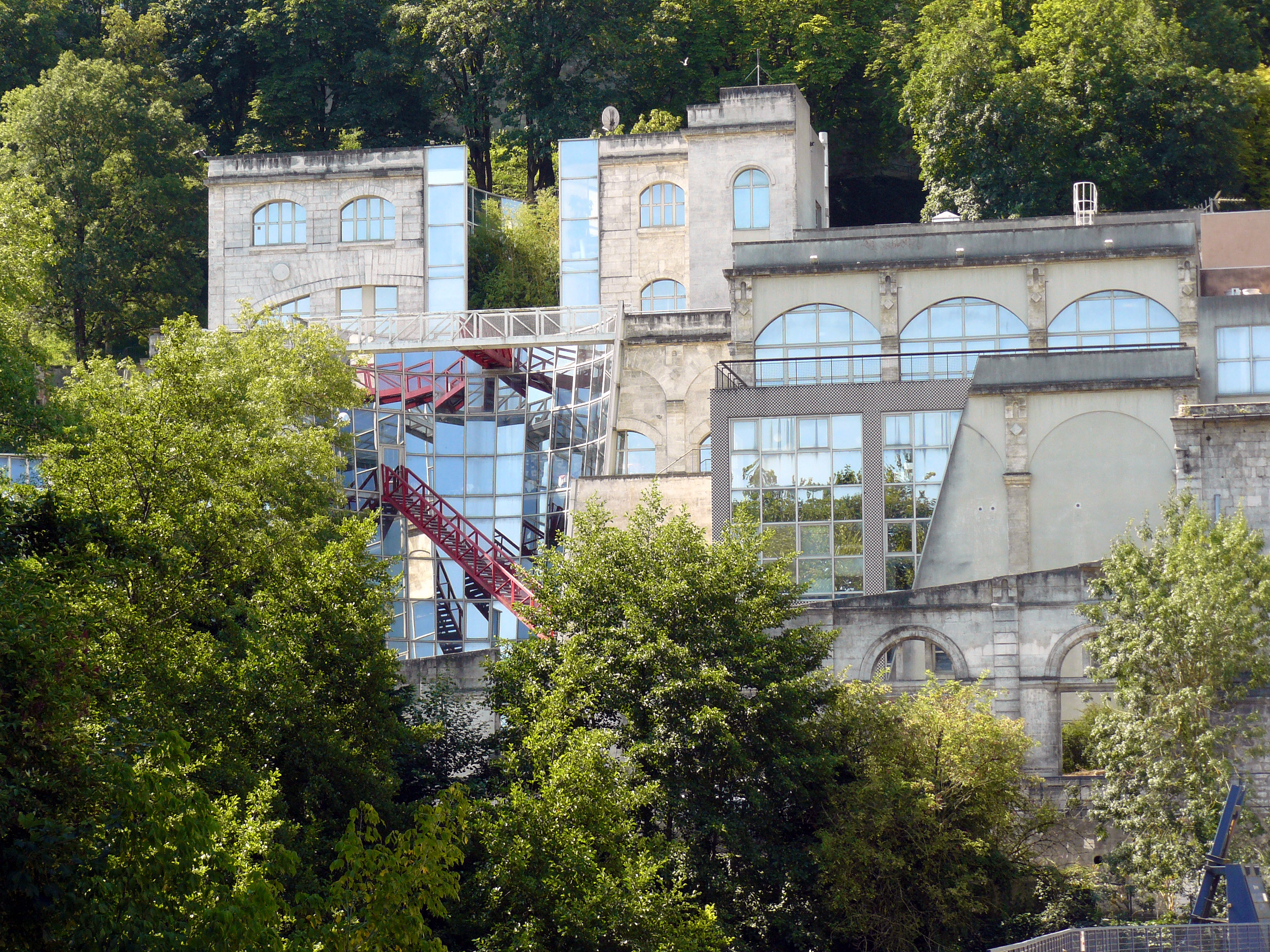
Facade of the main building of the Cité museum with the "Vaisseau Mœbius" on the right, named for the nation's most revered BD artist

In France, Minister Jack Lang – who hit upon the idea after he had visited the permanent BD exhibition in the town's art museum in 1982, incidentally inspiring his long-term fifteen points policy plan for the medium that year, which included the establishment of a national BD museum – announced in 1984 the advent of a major national BD museum as part of President Mitterrand's grand scheme of providing the nation with major public works of a cultural nature (known in France as Grandes Operations d'Architecture et d'Urbanisme), to be housed in the historical town of Angoulême, already the locus of France's biggest annual BD festival since 1974. A major project in the making, involving the renovation of several ancient buildings and the designing of a new one spread over the grounds of the town's former brewery by renowned architect Roland Castro, the museum, Cité internationale de la bande dessinée et de l'image, only opened its doors in June 2009 (though two smaller sub-museums, eventually incorporated in the larger final one, were already open to the public as early as 1991) in the process becoming the largest BD museum in Europe. The museum is administered by the CNBDI, established in 1985 for upcoming museum, but which has since then expanded its work on behalf of the BD beyond the confines of the museum alone, as already indicated above. On 11 December 2012, one of the buildings on the museum grounds, the futuristic building finished at the end of the 1980s housing the museum and CNBDI administrations, cinema, conference rooms, library and the other facilities for comics studies, was rechristened "The Vessel Mœbius" (French: Le Vaisseau Mœbius), in honour of the in that year deceased BD artist. When Lang had presented his plans, he was faced with opposition from some politicians who had rather seen such a museum in the capital of France, Paris. These politicians did have a point however, as Angoulême is somewhat located off the beaten tourist track, resulting in that the museum only draws in about roughly half the visitor numbers its smaller Belgian counterpart does annually, and most of them visiting the museum during the festival season, whereas the Belgian museum draws in a steady stream of visitors all year round.

=== 1990–present ===
A further revival and expansion came in the 1990s with several small independent publishers emerging, such as L'Association (established in 1990), Le Dernier Cri, Amok, Fréon (the latter two later merging into Frémok), and Ego comme X Known as "la nouvelle bande dessinée" (similar to the North American alternative comics), including La Cinquième Couche (founded 1993), which specialises in conceptual and experimental comics. These books are often more artistic, graphically and narratively, than the usual products of the big companies.

Dupuy and Berberian, Lewis Trondheim, Joann Sfar, Marjane Satrapi (Persepolis), Christophe Blain, Stéphane Blanquet, Edmond Baudoin, David B, and Emmanuel Larcenet all started their careers with these publishers, and would later gain fame with comics such as Donjon (Trondheim & Sfar), Isaac the Pirate (Blain), Professeur Bell (Sfar). Léo Quievreux, a key artist in the 1990s scene, founded and ran his own publication house, Gotoproduction, which he ran along with Jean Kristau and Anne-Fred Maurer from 1991 to 2000 or 2001, and which published over 60 books.

In the 2000s and 2010s, the French and Belgian comics industry combined the established album tradition with the growth of independent and alternative comics. Authors who had emerged from the independent scene during the 1990s achieved wider recognition, while established publishers continued to release major commercial series. Digital distribution also became increasingly significant, with online catalogues and digital platforms providing new ways to access European comics. Initiatives such as Europe Comics, launched in 2015 by 13 of the biggest European comics publishers with support from the European Commission's Creative Europe programme, sought to promote European comics internationally through a shared digital catalogue.

Digital distribution continued to develop during the 2020s, alongside the internationalisation of comics publishing. Publishers increasingly incorporated digital rights into international licensing agreements, with digital rights included in 30.4% of French publishing contracts in 2024, compared with 26.4% in 2023. These developments formed part of a broader effort to distribute illustrated works across different markets and formats, although print albums remained central to the traditional Franco-Belgian comics industry.

The COVID-19 pandemic and its aftermath brought significant changes to the French-language comics market. Following a period of strong sales in 2021 and 2022, the market contracted in 2023 and 2024. In France, the comics and manga market generated approximately €837 million in revenue in 2024, remaining substantially larger than in 2019 despite the subsequent decline. Manga accounted for more than half of the comics sold, while traditional Franco-Belgian series, children's comics and graphic novels continued to form important parts of the market.

The art of comics has been recognized as cultural heritage by Brussels since 2024.

The economic situation of comic-book authors became an increasingly prominent issue during the 2020s. Rising production costs, changing sales patterns and pressure on publishers' finances raised concerns about the sustainability of the profession. In 2025, the États Généraux de la Bande Dessinée conducted a new survey of authors to examine their professional, financial and social conditions. The results, published in 2026, indicated that precarious working conditions remained a major concern for a large proportion of French comics creators.

== Formats ==
Before the Second World War, comics were almost exclusively published in tabloid newspapers. Since 1945, the "comic album" (or "comics album", in French "album BD" for short) format gained popularity, a book-like format about half the former size. The albums, usually coloured all the way through, are almost always hardcover for the French editions and softcover for the Dutch editions—though the hardcover format has steadily gained ground from the late-1980s onward as customer option alongside the softcover format, contrary to Francophone Europe, where the hardcover format is the norm. When compared to US comic books and trade paperbacks (such as the later US graphic novel format), the European albums are rather large (roughly A4 standard). Comic albums started to receive their own individual ISBNs from the mid-1970s onward all over Europe solidifying their status as books.

Conceived as a format as currently understood in Belgium with the first Tintin albums in the early 1930s—incidentally the second reason for considering Tintin the starting point of the modern Franco-Belgian comic, besides the art style and format—albums were usually published as a collected book after a story or a convenient number of short stories had finished their run in serialised magazine (pre-)publication, usually with a one to two year lag. Since the inception of the format, it has been common for these albums to contain either 46 (for decades the standard) or, to a lesser degree, 62 pages (discounting the two disclaimer, and title pages) for print and binding technical reasons as printers traditionally printed eight double-sided pages on one sheet of print paper, though albums with a larger page count—provided the total page count is a multiple of eight—are not that uncommon, the graphic novel album publications of À Suivre publisher Casterman in particular.

It is in this field that Jean-Michel Charlier again turned out to be a seminal influence for the cultural phenomenon bandes dessinée. As publishing co-editor of Pilote, it was he who initiated a line of comic albums, for Dargaud, collecting the stories as serialised in the magazine until then, becoming in effect Dargaud's first comic album releases. The first July 1961 title in the series, titled La Collection Pilote, was the first adventure of Asterix from Uderzo and Goscinny, a runaway success right from the bat, followed by sixteen further titles from the magazine, with the first Blueberry adventure, "Fort Navajo", becoming the last to be released in July 1965. After that, the collection was suspended and each comic hero(s) hitherto featured therein, spun off in album series of their own. In order to give these releases a more "mature" book-like image, the albums were from the very start executed as hardcover editions for France, while being executed in softcover by licensee Le Lombard for Charlier's own native Belgium, somewhat reflecting the status comic albums still had in that country, as it had in other European countries. Charlier's initiative was not entirely devoid of a healthy dose of self-interest, as over half the releases in the collection were titles form comic series he had (co-)created. While Charlier did not conceive the format as such—since Casterman already released such albums since the early 1930s (Tintin), as did Dupuis sometime thereafter with some of its releases, but certainly not all as most of its albums like the Buck Danny series were released in softcover at the time – "his" albums were more than favorably received however, and the collection has attained a mythical status in the world of Franco-Belgian comics, especially in France where such releases had until then been rarities at best – excepting the "recuil" magazine series releases, album-like hard/softcover editions, chronologically collecting several magazine issues into one volume like Cœurs Vaillants, Spirou etc. and for decades a staple in Francophone Europe (and after the War, in Dutch-Europe as well).

It was only after the runaway success of the Collection that the hardcover became the norm for album releases in France. Even though the success of the collection prompted Le Lombard to speed up its hitherto lacklustre album releases, they did so initially in the predominant soft cover format until the mid-1970s like Dupuis was already doing, while maintaining the softcover format as standard for the Dutch-language editions for decades thereafter, as did Dargaud. Being a relative newcomer in the field Dargaud entered into a joint venture for the album releases with Le Lombard for nearly two decades. This meant that Dargaud album titles were released by Lombard for French-speaking Belgium (initially as soft covers in the first decade) and with a couple of years lag, for Dutch-Belgium as well (for the Netherlands and likewise with a lag, Dargaud sought out cooperation with other, local publishers for their releases), whereas Lombard album titles were released in France by Dargaud, invariably as hardcovers for their own releases, but in softcover for the first five years or so for the Lombard releases before permanently switching to hardcover, even before Lombard did for its Belgian home market. By the late 1970s, Dargaud had its own international distribution system in place, and the cooperation with Le Lombard was dissolved, that is until both were merged into a single publisher in 1992 – though maintaining their respective imprints – after they were absorbed in 1988 and 1986 respectively into the French holding company Média-Participations. Incidentally, Dupuis was in June 2004 bought by Média-Participations as well, though it has retained its separate status within the holding group because of its traditional focus on a somewhat younger readership than Dargaud/Le Lombard.

Since the mid-1980s, many comics are published directly as albums and do not appear in the magazines at all, as many comic magazines have disappeared since then for socio-economic reasons, including greats like Tintin, À Suivre, Métal Hurlant, and Pilote. The album format has also been adopted for native comics in most other European countries (the United Kingdom having until recently been one of the most manifest exceptions), as well as being maintained in foreign translations, in the process becoming the preeminent publication format of comics on the European continent, including the former Eastern Bloc after the fall of the wall in 1989. As with the Dutch-language editions, the soft cover format was initially the predominant format in which the foreign editions were released, but like the Dutch editions, the hard cover format has steadily gained ground in the other European countries as well, with Spain and Portugal having been early adopters as several volumes from La Collection Pilote were already released as such in the second half of the 1960s by local Dargaud/Lombard affiliated publishers, albeit as separate series contrary to the Collection source publication.

=== Intégrales ===
Since the mid-1980s, many of the popular, longer-lasting album series, and also several long out-of-print classic series, also get their own hardcover collected "omnibus" album editions, or intégrales, with each intégrale book generally containing two to five (sequential) titles of the series' original individual album releases, and from the mid-1990s onward increasingly including several inédits habitually – material that hasn't been published in albums before, such as magazine covers not used for albums – as well, alongside detailed illustrated editorials providing background information on the series in question and its creator(s), predominantly written by native comics scholars of which José-Louis Bocquet, Patrick Gaumer, and Gilles Ratier are the most prolific ones (see below). A practical reason for publishers to proceed in this manner, is the more recent fact that these older series have to some extent ran their courses in decades-long reprint runs of the individual volumes, and that it has commercially become more expedient to re-issue sold out volumes in this format, instead of continuing to reprint the individual volumes, aside from tapping into a new replacement market by targeting the nostalgia of now grown-up and more affluent readers who want to upgrade their worn-out individual copies they had bought and read as youths. Initially only released in French and, to a lesser degree, Dutch, these editions have after the late-1990s surged in popularity, becoming increasingly popular in other European countries as well in (hardcover) translation, where the intégrale format is in some cases also employed for native comics, particularly in Spain (by publishers such as Editores de Tebeos, Ponent Mon, and Dolmen Editorial), the Netherlands (notably by Uitgeverij L) and Germany, a few of them reciprocally translated into French. All of the great Franco-Belgian comic publishing houses, still in existence, are as of 2017 engaged in releasing intégrales, either by themselves, or by licensing them out to local publishers for other European countries – or both, as is the case for Dutch language editions.

== Styles ==
While more recent comics can no longer be easily categorised into one art style anymore (due to the increasing blurring of the boundaries between the styles in more recent comic creations – aside from the introduction of new and/or other art styles), and the old artists who pioneered the market are retiring, there were initially three basic, distinct styles within the field prior to the mid-1970s, featured in those comics with Belgian pedigree in particular.

One of the early greats, Belgian Joseph "Jijé" Gilian, was noted for creating comics in all three styles, the schematic style for his early work, "comic-dynamic" style for his later humouristic comics, as well as creating comics in the realistic style. The latter style he acquired during World War II when he had to complete realistic comics such as Fred Harman's Red Ryder after the occupying Germans prohibited the import of these US comics. At first influenced by the style of such US artists like Harman, Jijé developed a realistic style distinctively his own (and thus European), and which became a major source of inspiration for future French/Belgian talents aspiring a career in creating realistic comics, the first and foremost of them having been Jean Giraud. Another of these Jijé-inspired youngsters was Jean-Claude Mézières, who actually started out his famed science-fiction creation Valérian and Laureline in the "comic-dynamic" style, but which quickly gravitated towards the realistic style, though traces of the former remain discernible in the depictions of his aliens, which therefore constituted an early example of the mixing of the three basic art styles. Another ambiguous, even earlier, example concerned the creations of Victor Hubinon (Buck Danny, Redbeard), who created comics in his own distinct style that had the characteristics of both the realistic and schematic styles, but which can not be unambiguously be categorised as either, or at the most be categorised as an "in between" style.

=== Realistic style ===
The realistic comics are often laboriously detailed. An effort is made to make the comics look as convincing, as natural as possible, while still being drawings. No speed lines or exaggerations are used. This effect is often reinforced by the colouring, which is less even, less primary than schematic or comic-dynamic comics. Famous examples are Jerry Spring by Jijé, Blueberry by Giraud, and Thorgal by Rosiński.

=== Comic-dynamic style ===
This is the almost Barksian line of Franquin and Uderzo. The humoristic comics in Pilote were almost exclusively comic-dynamic, and so were the ones in Spirou and l'Écho des savanes. These comics have very agitated drawings, often using lines of varying thickness to accent the drawings. The artists working in this style for Spirou, including Franquin, Morris, Jean Roba, and Peyo, are often grouped as the Marcinelle school.

=== Schematic style (ligne claire style) ===
The major factor in schematic drawings is a reduction of reality to easy, clear lines. Typical is the lack of shadows, the geometrical features, and the realistic proportions. Another trait is the often "slow" drawings, with little to no speed-lines, and strokes that are almost completely even. It is also known as the Belgian clean line style or ligne claire. The Adventures of Tintin is not only a very good example of this, it is currently also considered as the original template for the style as used in modern European comics. Other works in this style are the early comics of Jijé, who not only worked in the style, but also expanded upon it by adding Art Deco elements resulting in what several scholars came to consider a separate spin-off style, dubbed the "Atom style". This Jijé specific comics style enjoyed a revival in later works from French, Flemish and Dutch artists like Yves Chaland, Ever Meulen, and Joost Swarte respectively, the latter of whom, incidentally, actually coined the alternative ligne claire designation in 1977.

Even though Jijé has somewhat receded in oblivion outside his own native Belgium, he is held in high esteem by many of his peers, both those he tutored like Franquin and Mœbius, and others, and his versatility was such that it solicited an accolade of high praise from fellow artist Tibet, author of Ric Hochet and Chick Bill, who has stated that "If Hergé is considered as God the Father, then Jijé undoubtedly is the Godfather". After Jijé, it were predominantly French (Philippe Druillet, Jean Giraud as "Mœbius", Jacques Tardi, Annie Goetzinger, Fred) and Italian (Guido Crepax, Hugo Pratt, Lorenzo Mattotti, Attilio Micheluzzi) comics artists who increasingly introduced alternative art styles – sometimes extensive innovations/modernisations/expansions of the three existing basic styles, sometimes entirely new – in the medium from the mid-1970s onward, either by creating them directly for native publications, or by becoming major influences through translations which in Francophone Europe was especially the case for the Italians.

== Foreign comics ==
=== Comics from other European countries ===
Despite the large number of local publications, the French and Belgian editors release numerous adaptations of comics from all over the world. In particular these include other European publications, from countries such as, most conspicuously, Italy (Guido Crepax, Hugo Pratt, and Milo Manara among many others), and to a somewhat lesser degree Spain (Daniel Torres), and Argentina (Alberto Breccia, Héctor Germán Oesterheld, and José Antonio Muñoz). Some well-known German (Andreas, Matthias Schultheiss), Swiss (Derib, Job, Cosey, Zep, Enrico Marini), and Polish (Grzegorz Rosiński) authors work almost exclusively for the Franco-Belgian market and their publishers such as Glénat and, most conspicuously, Le Lombard. Likewise, the French naturalised Yugoslav Enki Bilal worked exclusively for French publishers Dargaud and subsequently Les Humanoïdes Associés, whereas Dutch graphic novelist Paul Teng has, after his career failed to take off in his native country, first worked for Casterman before switching to Le Lombard and subsequently to Dargaud.

=== Comics from the United States and United Kingdom ===
Classic US and British comic books, those of the traditional superhero genres in particular, are not as well represented in the French and Belgian comics market, for the reasons as explored above. However, the graphic novel work of Will Eisner and Art Spiegelman (first published in French in À Suivre) is respected to such a high extent that it has actually led to the adoption of the English expression in mainland Europe as well, particularly for such mature works as published by Casterman or Les Humanoïdes Associés. Nonetheless, a few comic strips like Peanuts and Calvin and Hobbes have had considerable success in France and Belgium. Yet, it was in the field of the graphic novels that US and British creations did attract attention from the Franco-Belgian comic world, the early ones having been Richard Corben and Bernie Wrightson, the former of which having started out in the US underground comix scene, where artists created comics with the express intent to distance themselves from the classic US comics as produced by the big studios. Both men were published in the Métal Hurlant US spin-off Heavy Metal and reciprocally translated for the French mother magazine. As mentioned, Heavy Metal made a deep artistic impact on an entire young generation of English-speaking comic creators, such as Neil Gaiman and Mike Mignola, who started to create more modern, more mature comics henceforth. It were these comics that were given attention by publisher Glénat, when they established the subsidiary Comics USA in 1988. Actually starting out with (hardcover!) comic book sized publications in the classic superhero genre, but created by a young generation of artists, the classic US comic failed to make a convincing come-back and the subsidiary folded in 1991 after 48 issues. Subsequently, Glénat focused solely on its concurrent Glénat Comics imprint which concentrated on album releases of modern US graphic novels from such publishers as Image Comics, Dark Horse, and Oni Press, and as such still in existence as of 2017. Glénat was actually preceded in 1986 by Delcourt, a newcomer presently specialised in US/UK graphic novels (and Japanese manga). Of the post-classic superhero era, Mike Mignola has become one of the most in French translated US comic artists. Recently, Eaglemoss Collections and DC Comics have embarked on yet another attempt to re-introduce Francophone readership to the classic US superhero genre with their DC Comics: Le Meilleur des Super-Héros collection, launched in French in 2015, following in the wake of publisher Hachette who launched their Marvel Comics: La collection the year previously in an attempt to capitalise on the break-out success of the 21st-century Marvel Comics film adaptions.

=== Comics from Japan ===
Japanese manga started to receive more attention from the early to mid-1990s onward. Recently, more manga has been translated and published, with a particular emphasis on independent authors like Jiro Taniguchi. Manga now represents more than one fourth of comics sales in France. French comics that draw inspiration from Japanese manga are called manfra (or also franga, manga français or global manga). In addition, in an attempt to unify the Franco-Belgian and Japanese schools, cartoonist Frédéric Boilet started the movement La nouvelle manga. Illustrative of the market share the manga has conquered is that Dargaud has in 1996 spun off their manga French-language publications into a specialised publisher of it own, Kana, currently co-existing alongside the already established specialist Delcourt, and since 2000 joined by specialists Pika Édition, Kurokawa, Kazé, and Ki-oon. In 2014, Delcourt acquired the earliest known such specialist Tonkam, which had already been established in 1993.

== Conventions and journalistic professionalism ==
There are many comics conventions in Belgium and France. The most famous, prestigious and largest one is the Angoulême International Comics Festival, an annual festival begun in 1974, in Angoulême, France, and the format has been adopted in other European countries as well, unsurprisingly perhaps considering the popularity the Franco-Belgian comics enjoy in these countries, though they are typically of a more modest size, the Italian "Lucca Comics & Games" festival (Note: Est. 1965 and the only European comics festival to actually surpass the Angoulême one in size, but not prestige) excepted – though, as the name already suggest, that festival extents beyond comics alone, whereas the Angoulême festival is comics specific. During his tenure as culture minister, Jack Lang was a frequent guest of honour of the festival as part of his endeavours to advance the cultural status of the BD, and personally awarded the festival's awards to comic artists, which included Jean Giraud in 1985 when he received the festival's most prestigious award, the year after Lang had announced the advent of the national comics museum on the previous edition of the festival.

Typical for conventions are the expositions of original art, the signing sessions with authors, sale of small press and fanzines, an awards ceremony, and other comics related activities. Also, some artists from other counties travel to Angoulême and other festivals to show their work and meet their fans and editors. The Angoulême festival draws in over 200,000 visitors annually, including between 6,000 and 7,000 professionals and 800 journalists. Contrary to their US Comic Con counterparts, where other pop-culture media manifestations are increasingly taking precedence, movie and television productions in particular, continental European comics conventions remain to this day largely and firmly grounded in its source medium, the printed comics. US-style comic conventions are becoming popular as well though, but are invariably organised separately from the traditional BD festivals under the English denomination, and where the print materials are concerned focused on the US comic book, and Japanese manga publications.

One of the oldest Franco-Belgian comics conventions was the "Convention de la B.D. de Paris" (1969–2003), which was co-founded by Claude Moliterni. Though Moliterni was a BD writer (usually for artist Robert Gigi), he became primarily renowned as a tireless champion for the medium, in the process becoming one of France's first serious comics scholars by launching one of the first professional and serious comics journals worldwide, Phénix (périodique) (1966–1977), and writing numerous articles, reference books and, later on, (co-)launching specialised websites as well, on the subject matter. In doing so Moliterni became the European counterpart of equally renowned US – but French-born – comics scholar Maurice Horn, a contemporary with whom Moliterni had actually cooperated in the early years of their careers. Aside from this, Moliterni also became a prolific founder of comics conventions. The first one he co-founded was actually the Lucca one, experience gained on that experience put to good use for the Parisian one. Moliterni went on to co-found seven more conventions and permanent exhibitions in France and Italy, including Angoulême for which he is most renowned. His efforts for the medium gained Moliterni no less than three French civilian knighthoods.

The trailblazing journalistic – and subsequent scholastic – approach pioneered by Moliterni, which greatly aided in the acceptance of the medium as a mature part of Francophone culture, served as an inspiration for his successors, such as Henri Filippini, Thierry Groensteen, Stan Barets, Numa Sadoul, as well as the already mentioned Bocque, Gaumer, and Ratier, who have followed in his footsteps. With Gaumer incidentally, Moliterni revisited his 1964-1967 Spirou article series he had co-edited with Morris, which resulted in the edited and greatly enhanced 1994 reference work Dictionnaire mondial de la bande dessinée, published by Éditions Larousse (a renowned French encyclopaedia publisher), and a work very similar to Horn's 1976 The World Encyclopaedia of Comics, which in turn greatly resembled the older Spirou article series.

Likewise, his Phénix trade journal has seen a plethora of successors following suit all over western Europe as well. Actually, the second oldest known professional European comics trade journal was the Dutch Stripschrift, launched in 1968 and coinciding with the definitive breakthrough of the BD in the Netherlands, before a second Francophone comics journal (Les Cahiers de la bande dessinée, launched in 1969 as Schtroumpf by Jacques Glénat and in effect the founding block of his namesake publishing house) had even entered the fray. During its first couple of years of publication, Stripschrift was in effect very reliant on Phénix for content, before it managed to shake off its French roots and stand on its own, and is, contrary to its French progenitor, still being published as of 2020 and thus the oldest known professional comics journal still in existence worldwide.

== Impact and popularity ==
Franco-Belgian comics have been translated in most European languages, with some of them enjoying a worldwide success. Some magazines, aside from the Dutch-language editions, have been translated in Greek, Portuguese, Italian and Spanish, while in other cases foreign magazines were filled with the best of the Franco-Belgian comics. In France and Belgium, most magazines have since then disappeared or have a largely reduced circulation for socio-economic reasons (but mostly because modern readership no longer possesses the patience to read their comics in weekly or monthly instalments, instead preferring to have a story presented to them wholesale in album format), but the number of published and sold albums stays relatively high – the majority of new titles being currently directly published as albums without prior magazine serialisation – with the biggest successes still on the juvenile and adolescent markets. This state of affairs has been mirrored in the other European countries as well. As a format, the Franco-Belgian comic has been near-universally adopted by native comic artists all over Europe, especially in the neighbouring countries of Belgium and France (and including Italy, despite that country having had a rich and thriving comics culture of its own and with the Netherlands as an early adopter being one of the first, if not the first, to do so), solidifying the position of the Franco-Belgian comic as the preeminent force on the European comics scene, Great Britain excepted.

The greatest and most enduring success however was mainly for some series started in the 1940s, 1950s and 1960s (including Lucky Luke, The Smurfs, and Asterix), and the even older Adventures of Tintin. Many more recent series have not made a significant commercial impact outside mainland Europe and those overseas territories historically beholden to France, despite the critical acclaim for authors like Mœbius. One out-of-the-ordinary overseas exception where Franco-Belgian comics are as of 2017 still doing well was the Indian subcontinent, where translations in Tamil (spoken in the south-eastern part of India, Tamil Nadu, and on the island state of Sri Lanka) published by Prakash Publishers under their own "Lion/Muthu Comics" imprints, have proven to be very popular, though their appeal remain somewhat limited to the classic series for an adolescent readership as conceived in the 1960s–1980s, and that more recent, more mature series have yet to make an impression in those territories.

== Notable comics ==
While hundreds of comic series have been produced in the Franco-Belgian group, some are more notable than others. Most of those listed are aimed at the juvenile or adolescent markets:

- Adèle Blanc-Sec by Jacques Tardi
- Alix by Jacques Martin
- Asterix by René Goscinny and Albert Uderzo and others
- Barbe Rouge by Jean-Michel Charlier, Victor Hubinon and others
- Bécassine by Jacqueline Rivière and Joseph Pinchon and others
- Blacksad by Juan Díaz Canales and Juanjo Guarnido
- Blake and Mortimer by E.P. Jacobs and others
- Blueberry by Jean-Michel Charlier and Jean Giraud
- The Bluecoats by Willy Lambil and Raoul Cauvin
- Boule and Bill by Jean Roba
- Chlorophylle by Raymond Macherot and others
- Cubitus by Dupa
- Les Cités Obscures by François Schuiten and Benoît Peeters
- Gaston by André Franquin
- Incal by Alejandro Jodorowsky and Jean Giraud
- Iznogoud by René Goscinny and Jean Tabary
- Jeremiah by Hermann Huppen
- Jerry Spring by Jijé
- Jommeke by Jef Nys
- Kiekeboe by Merho
- Largo Winch by Philippe Francq and Jean Van Hamme
- Luc Orient by Eddy Paape and Greg
- Lucky Luke by Morris and René Goscinny and others
- Marsupilami by André Franquin and others
- Michel Vaillant by Jean Graton
- Nero by Marc Sleen
- Rahan by Roger Lecureux and André Chéret
- Ric Hochet by Tibet and André-Paul Duchâteau
- The Smurfs by Peyo and others
- Spike and Suzy (Dutch: Suske & Wiske) by Willy Vandersteen and others
- Spirou et Fantasio by André Franquin, Jijé and others
- Thorgal by Grzegorz Rosiński and Jean Van Hamme
- Tintin by Hergé
- Titeuf by Zep
- Valérian and Laureline by Jean-Claude Mézières and Pierre Christin
- XIII by William Vance and Jean Van Hamme
- Yoko Tsuno by Roger Leloup
- Zig et Puce by Alain Saint-Ogan

== See also ==
- Dany (comics)
- Franco-Belgian comics publishing houses
- List of comic books
- List of comics creators
- List of films based on French-language comics
- List of Franco-Belgian comics magazines
- List of Franco-Belgian comics series
