= Frémok =

Belgian comic book publisher

- Predecessor: Amok, Fréon
- Publication types: Books
- Fiction genres: comics
- Official website: www.fremok.org

Frémok (FRMK) is a Franco-Belgian comics publishing house, which is a "major" actor in the independent comics' scene that emerged during the 1990s in these countries. It was formed by the union of the former publishers Amok (France) and Fréon (Belgium) in 2002.

Frémok is driven by a deliberate will to question all stereotypes of the mainstream market, as format, art-technique, narration forms. This renewed approach of the comics has led to some particularly avant-garde albums. The FRMK has also translated the philosophical comics of Martin Tom Dieck (Salut, Deleuze!). The FRMK reissues Lycaons by Alex Barbier, a pioneer in direct color and a pictorial approach to the medium.
