= Les Frustrés =

French comic series

Publication information
- Publisher: Dargaud
- Publication date: October 1973 – 1981

Creative team
- Written by: Claire Bretécher

Les Frustrés is a comic strip series by the French writer Claire Bretécher, published from 1973 to 1981 in the center-left weekly Le Nouvel Observateur, as a continuation of Salades de saison published in Pilote from 1971 to 1973.

Les Frustrés (the Frustrated) are men and women, often from a wealthy intellectual background, confronted with their little daily worries. Sixty-eighters on the decline, bourgeois-bohemian, middle managers or even emancipated women, exchange their ideas on short black and white stories and allow the author to express various thoughts on society. The topics covered are very varied: educational methods and problems, conflict between generations, women's emancipation, married life and its crises, decadence of society, politics, etc. There are no recurring characters.

Les Frustrés have been translated into Italian, Castilian, Danish, German, English, Dutch, Finnish, Swedish, Norwegian, and Portuguese.

== Publication history ==
After several years spent working for the youth weeklies of Bande dessinée, Claire Bretécher joined in 1969 at Pilote, rather intended for adolescents. The following year, she produced pages for the Actualité , a series of often humorous short stories in which the newspaper's team commented on the present weather, a work that she did not appreciate very much. Quickly, she treats her news in a very satirical way to showcase the shortcomings of her contemporaries, and particularly those she knows best, the urban middle and upper classes of the left, in stories of one or two pages in the middle. regular format. From 1971, these stories were published separately from the news under the title Salades de saison, and are the subject of an album in 1973.

When Bretécher enters the Nouvel Observateur, it uses this format from its first publication, in the issue of 24. The fourth story, published on 15, is titled "The Frustrated Page", a title that appears above each plate from the October 29 issue.

In 1975, she published an author's first collection of her boards. This one, as well as the following four, is "a considerable success" and has been translated into several languages. In 1981, Bretécher decided to stop publishing every week in the Nouvel Obs.

== Commentaries ==
Earning its author the qualification in 1976 of "best sociologist of the year" by Roland Barthes, his Frustrés page is, according to Jean Daniel, "in depth, and in the second degree, one of the most effectively politicized chronicles of our weekly" According to Florence Montreynaud, the "conformists of anti-conformism" of whom the Frustrés de Brétecher portray "are also the readers of the" Nouvel Observateur "", namely "the snobs, the sons of bourgeois lefties, soft, hard, sexists, feminists, lax parents and their ugly jojos ”Bretécher makes the language of his characters the best way to turn them into "social archetypes. In this series, as in Salades de saison,

Tics of language, mannerisms, language of wood: the language of the French urban intellectual bourgeoisie of the 1970s is faithfully transcribed in its evolution, which allows the author to better show the contradictions, even the emptiness, of the permanent questions of his characters.

In the tradition of Jules Feiffer, one of his main inspiration, Bretécher generally uses in the Frustrés an extremely regular arrangement of boxes (Gaufrier) and drawings which are repeated a lot (Itération iconique) which allows better highlight the rare variations of the characters' postures and thus maximize the humorous effect carried by the text

== Albums ==
- Original series of five albums
1. Les Frustrés, 1975.
2. Les Frustrés 2, 1976.
3. Les Frustrés 3, 1978.
4. Les Frustrés 4, 1979.
5. Les Frustrés 5, 1980.
- Les Frustrés, France Loisirs, 2 volumes, 1978-1979. Recueil reprenant les 4 premiers volumes.
- Les Frustrés, Presses Pocket, 5 volumes, 1987. Édition poche
- Les Frustrés, auto-édition, 1996. Recueil des 5 volumes.
- Les Frustrés t. 1, Librio, coll. « Librio BD », 2005. Édition poche
- Les Frustrés : Morceaux choisis, Dargaud, 2008. Édition spécialement réalisée pour Le Nouvel Observateur. ISBN 978-2-505-00488-2
