= Claire Bretécher =

French cartoonist (1940–2020)

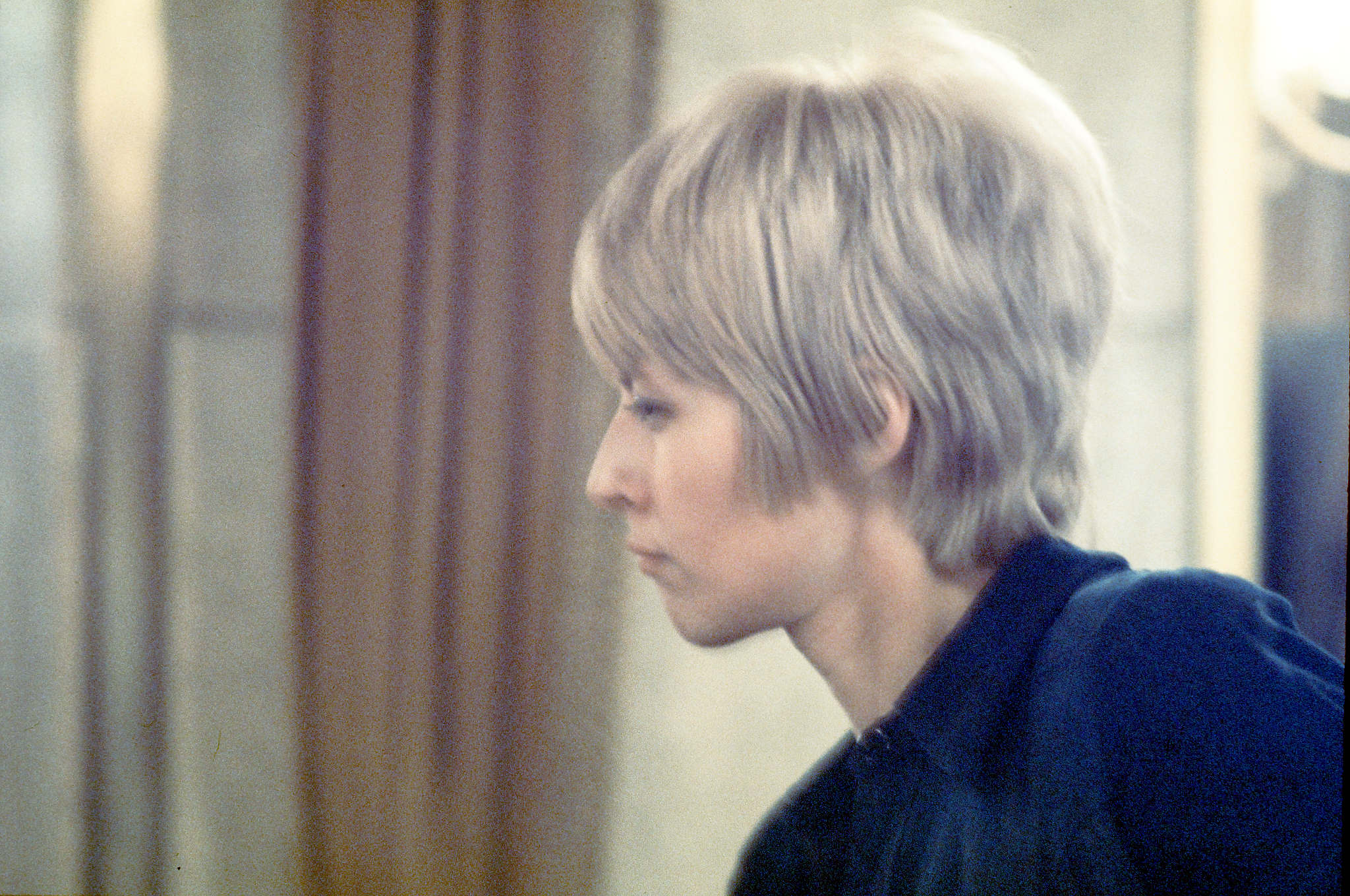
- Bretécher in 1973
- Born: 17 April 1940 Nantes, France
- Died: 10 February 2020 (aged 79) Paris, France
- Area: Cartoonist
- Notable works: Salades de saison Les Frustrés; Agrippine
- Awards: Full list

Claire Bretécher (French: [bʁəteʃe]; 17 April 1940 – 10 February 2020) was a French cartoonist, known particularly for her portrayals of women and gender issues. Her comics often narrated femininity from a different perspective and reinterpretted gender roles. Her creations included the satirical comic series Les Frustrés, and the unimpressed teenager Agrippine.

== Biography ==
Bretécher was born in Nantes, France, and was raised in a convent. She received her first break as an illustrator when she was asked to provide the artwork for Le facteur Rhésus by René Goscinny for L'Os à moelle in 1963. She went on to work for several popular magazines and in 1969 invented the character "Cellulite". In 1972, she founded the Franco-Belgian comics magazine L'Écho des savanes, with Gotlib and Mandryka .

She self published her first 25 books and is still one of the only artists to work for all three of the 9th art's founding journals: Tintin, Spirou and René Goscinny's Pilote. Throughout the 1970s and 1980s, she published successful collections, such as The Destiny of Monique (1982). In 2001, Bretécher's series Agrippine was adapted into a 26-episode TV series by Canal+.

In 2015, the Centre Pompidou organized the first monographic exhibit of Claire Bretécher's work. The exhibit retraced her career from the 1960s to the 2000s. This exhibit investigated the history of France over the last fifty years, thus casting light on its social, cultural, and political changes in France, all captured by Claire Bretécher's work.

Claire Bretécher was the widow of French constitutionalist Guy Carcassonne, with whom she had a son.

She died in Paris on 10 February 2020, aged 79, after suffering for some years from Alzheimer's disease.

== Awards ==
- 1975: Best French Author at the Angoulême International Comics Festival, France
- 1987: Adamson Award for Best International Comic Book Cartoonist, Sweden
- 1999: Humour Award at the Angoulême International Comics Festival
- 2002: nominated for the Dialogue Award at the Angoulême International Comics Festival

== Bibliography ==
- Les états d'âme de Cellulite (1972, Dargaud, ISBN 2-205-00597-9), part of the Cellulite (Claire Bretécher) series
- Salades de saison (1973, Dargaud, ISBN 2-205-00702-5)
- Les angoisses de Cellulite (1974, Glénat, ISBN 2-205-00754-8), part of the Cellulite (Claire Bretécher) series
- Les Gnangnan (1974, Dargaud, ISBN 2-723-40007-7)
- Les Frustrés (5 albums, 1975–80, Bretecher)
- Le Cordon infernal (1976, Bretecher, ISBN 2-901076-02-5)
- Les Naufragés (1976, Glénat, scénario de Raoul Cauvin, ISBN 2-723400-33-6)
- Les Amours écologiques du Bolot occidental (1977, Glénat, ISBN 2-901076-04-1)
- Baratine et Molgaga (1980, Glénat, ISBN 2-7234-0062-X)
- La Vie passionnée de Thérèse d'Avila (1980, Bretecher, ISBN 2-901076-06-8)
- Les Mères (1982, Bretecher, ISBN 2-901076-08-4)
- Le Destin de Monique (1983, Bretecher, ISBN 2-901076-09-2)
- Docteur Ventouse, bobologue (2 albums 1985–86, Bretecher/Hyphen)
- Agrippine (8 albums 1988–2009, Bretecher/Hyphen/Dargaud)
- Tourista (comic strip) (1989, Bretecher, ISBN 2-901076-13-0)
- Mouler démouler (1996, Bretecher, ISBN 2-901076-23-8)
- Une Saga génétique (2006, Dargaud, ISBN 9782505000259)
- Robin les foies (2006, Glénat, ISBN 9782723456494)
- Fernand l'orphelin (2006, Glénat, ISBN 9782723456494)
- Tulipe et Minibus (2006, Glénat, scénario de Hubuc, ISBN 9782723456494)
- Inédits (2007, Dargaud, ISBN 9782505002468)
