= Snowpiercer (TV series) =

Post-apocalyptic dystopian thriller TV series

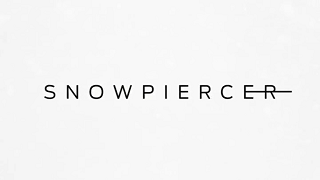
- Genre: Climate fiction; Drama; Dystopian; Post-apocalyptic; Thriller
- Based on: Snowpiercer Screenplay by Bong Joon-ho and Kelly Masterson Screen Story by Bong Joon-ho; Le Transperceneige by Jacques Lob, Benjamin Legrand and Jean-Marc Rochette
- Developed by: Josh Friedman and Graeme Manson
- Showrunners: Graeme Manson; Paul Zbyszewski
- Starring: Jennifer Connelly; Daveed Diggs; Mickey Sumner; Alison Wright; Iddo Goldberg; Susan Park; Katie McGuinness; Sam Otto; Sheila Vand; Mike O'Malley; Annalise Basso; Jaylin Fletcher; Lena Hall; Roberto Urbina; Steven Ogg; Rowan Blanchard; Sean Bean; Chelsea Harris; Archie Panjabi; Clark Gregg; Michael Aronov
- Music by: Bear McCreary; Bobby Krlic; James Kelly
- Country of origin: United States
- Original language: English
- No. of seasons: 4
- No. of episodes: 40

Production
- Executive producers: Scott Derrickson; Bong Joon-ho; Dooho Choi; Miky Lee; Tae-Sung Jeong; Lee Tae-hun; Park Chan-wook; Matthew O'Connor; Marty Adelstein; Becky Clements; James Hawes; Graeme Manson; Jinnie Choi; Ben Rosenblatt; Christoph Schrewe; Aubrey Nealon; Paul Zbyszewski; Alissa Bachner (season 4)
- Producers: Jiwon Park; Alissa Bachner (seasons 1–3); Mackenzie Donaldson; Holly Redford; Bill Balas; Jay Prychidny; Yeonu Choi; Victoria Burkhart; Michael Bhim; Leslie Hope
- Cinematography: John Grillo; Thomas Burstyn; Jaime Reynoso; Trig Singer; Yaron Levy
- Editors: Jay Prychidny; Cheryl Potter; Allan Lee; Steve Polivka; Marta Evry; Jamie Alain; Justin Li; D. Gillian Truster; Erin Deck; Nicholas Wong; John Nicholls; Sabrina Pitre; Kelvin Tseng
- Running time: 44–51 minutes
- Production companies: CJ Entertainment; Dog Fish Films; Studio T; Lone Lemon Productions; Tomorrow Studios; ITV Studios

Original release
- Network: TNT
- Release: May 17, 2020 – March 28, 2022
- Network: AMC
- Release: July 21 – September 22, 2024

Snowpiercer is an American post-apocalyptic dystopian thriller television series that premiered on May 17, 2020, on TNT. It is based on both the 2013 film of the same name, directed by Bong Joon-ho, and the 1982 French graphic novel Le Transperceneige by Jacques Lob, Benjamin Legrand and Jean-Marc Rochette, from which the film was adapted.

The series follows the passengers of the Snowpiercer, a gigantic, perpetually moving train that circles the globe carrying the remnants of humanity seven years after the world becomes a frozen wasteland. The series questions class warfare, social injustice and the politics of survival. Jennifer Connelly and Daveed Diggs star alongside Mickey Sumner, Alison Wright, Iddo Goldberg, Susan Park, Katie McGuinness, Sam Otto, Sheila Vand, Mike O'Malley, Annalise Basso, Jaylin Fletcher, Lena Hall and Roberto Urbina. Steven Ogg, Rowan Blanchard and Sean Bean joined the main cast in the second season, both Chelsea Harris and Archie Panjabi joined the main cast in the third season and both Clark Gregg and Michael Aronov joined the main cast in the fourth season.

While in development at TNT for over three years, the series faced numerous production issues and delays arising from creative differences between the series' producers and the network. The series remained in development hell until May 2019, when it was announced that it would instead air on TNT's sister network TBS in the second quarter of 2020 and that it had already been renewed for a second season. However, in September 2019, the decision to change networks was reversed.

Prior to studio shutdowns that occurred due to the outbreak of the COVID-19 pandemic in the United States, most of the second season's production was completed. The second season premiered on January 25, 2021. In January 2021, the series was renewed for a third season, which premiered on January 24, 2022. In July 2021, the series was renewed for a fourth season. In June 2022, it was announced that the fourth season would be its last. In January 2023, it was announced that the fourth season would not air on TNT and was in the process of moving elsewhere. In March 2024, it was announced that AMC had picked up the fourth and final season, which premiered on July 21, 2024, and the series concluded on September 22, 2024.

== Series overview ==
Snowpiercer is set in 2026, seven years after the world becomes a frozen wasteland due to ecocide following the launch of a chemical compound called CW-7 that aimed to cool the rapidly warming Earth, and follows the remnants of humanity who have taken shelter on a perpetually moving luxury train. Designed and built by the eccentric billionaire Mr. Joseph Wilford, the train consists of 1,001 carriages and circles the globe 2.7 times per year. The constant motion of the train provides energy and prevents the passengers from freezing as well. Since the catastrophe, the train's population has become rigidly separated by class, caught up in a revolutionary struggle against the strictly imposed social hierarchy and unbalanced allocation of limited resources. The show explores issues of class warfare, social injustice, and the politics of survival.

=== Season 1 ===
Seven years after an apocalyptic event known as the Freeze, the last known survivors of humanity travel aboard Snowpiercer, the 1,001 car Great Ark Train built by Joseph Wilford of Wilford Industries. Although Wilford is believed to be controlling the train from the Eternal Engine, this is a myth perpetrated by Head Engineer Melanie Cavil in order to maintain order. In reality, Melanie abandoned Wilford at boarding, and he is presumed to be dead.

When a series of murders occur, Melanie enlists the help of Andre Layton, a Chicago homicide detective before the Freeze and the leader of the unticketed stowaways living in the tail of the train – dubbed the Tailies – to solve the murders. In secret, Layton uses the opportunity to prepare for his revolution to take control of the train. What begins as a revolution turns into a full-scale war between the classes when First Class rebels learn of Melanie's secret. With Melanie's help, Layton prevails and takes control of the train, only to have Wilford arrive on a 40 car long supply train known as Big Alice, bringing Snowpiercer to a stop in the ruins of Chicago.

=== Season 2 ===
An initial confrontation with Wilford's forces ends in a draw, leaving Snowpiercer and Big Alice permanently linked. In addition, Melanie's daughter Alex is revealed to be still alive and with Wilford. With both sides unable to take the other train by force, a game of political intrigue plays out as Layton and Wilford fight for control over Snowpiercer. Melanie discovers evidence that CW-7, the chemical that caused the Freeze, is breaking up in the atmosphere, suggesting that the planet is warming much sooner than expected and she leaves the train to perform research on her theory.

Wilford eventually succeeds in taking control of Snowpiercer, leaving Melanie behind to die. However, Layton and several of his allies escape, destroying the Aquarium Car and allowing them to steal the first ten cars of the train in order to go back for Melanie. They recover Melanie's data, but find her gone, having walked out into the Freeze to die after running out of supplies. Melanie's data shows that the planet is indeed warming, with 7 promising warm spots, creating hope for a life outside of the train.

=== Season 3 ===
Six months later, Snowpiercer has become a 10 car long pirate train while Big Alice has become a 1,023 car sub-zero "rolling gulag." Layton and his allies aboard Snowpiercer search the locations indicated by Melanie's data for a habitable location while his remaining allies on Big Alice mount a rebellion against Wilford. Although Layton's search proves to be mostly fruitless, he discovers a survivor named Asha and has a vision suggesting that the last warm spot in the Horn of Africa might be suitable to build a New Eden. Layton and Wilford engage in a battle that ends with Layton seizing control of both trains and imprisoning Wilford. In order to sell people on traveling to the Horn of Africa, Layton has Asha lie that he found her there.

As the trains travel to New Eden, Layton has to deal with becoming a new father and attempts on his life by his former friend and ally Pike. At the same time, Wilford survives an attempt on his own life and briefly struggles with his mortality and his future. After a coma dream featuring a dystopian future for Snowpiercer, Layton realizes that his New Eden vision was a hallucination brought on by oxygen deprivation and loses faith. Asha sacrifices herself to save Snowpiercer from a cloud of toxic gas and encourages Layton not to give up, renewing his faith.

At the end of the season, Wilford deduces that Melanie is still alive and Snowpiercer rescues her. Melanie's concerns about New Eden leads to the exposure of Layton's lie, a new conflict brewing aboard the train, and the escape of Wilford. Layton and Melanie resolve their differences once and for all and band together to banish Wilford from Snowpiercer. The passengers are then given a choice between continuing on Snowpiercer with Melanie or taking a chance on going to New Eden on Big Alice with Layton. The rough track derails Big Alice upon arrival, but New Eden proves to be habitable. Three months later, Melanie spots a rocket launching and exploding in the distance.

=== Season 4 ===
The rocket launch proves to be a trap and Snowpiercer is hijacked by soldiers from the International Peacekeeping Forces led by Admiral Anton Milius. The train is brought to the Silo, a military bunker in Djibouti, where Doctor Nima Rousseau reveals to Melanie that his research team has developed a compound called Gemini that will cause CW-7 to break up and end the Freeze. Nima's research is the source of New Eden's warm spot, but he requires Snowpiercer to spread Gemini around the world. Melanie agrees to retrofit the train and work on the project, but Milius and the IPF turn Snowpiercer into a virtual labor camp for the passengers.

Nine months later, New Eden has become a thriving community led by Ruth Wardell, Layton having stepped down in favor of a democratically elected town council. However, the peace is shattered by the kidnapping of Layton's daughter Liana by the IPF and the murder of his ex-wife Zarah. With the support of the people, Layton takes Big Alice after Snowpiercer, leading to Layton and his girlfriend Josie being taken captive at the Silo where Wilford is revealed to be the mastermind behind Liana's kidnapping. After his allies escape with Big Alice and a number of rescued Snowpiercer passengers, Layton forms a reluctant alliance with Wilford to rescue Liana and take down Milius. In a final confrontation with Layton, Wilford kills himself, but not before revealing that Nima is the one who had created CW-7 and caused the Freeze. At the same time, the people of New Eden investigate a series of strange happenings, including the disappearance of Sam Roche, finding a severed hand in the hills and the Snowpiercer passenger it belongs to, ghostly voices heard by Oz in the mountains, and finally the revelation that the IPF has planted bombs to bury the town. Roche later reappears just in time to rescue Layton's family, having been captured by the IPF before managing to escape.

Nima takes control of Snowpiercer, ignoring Melanie's warnings that her data reveals that Gemini will cause atmospheric erosion and bring an end to all of the remaining life on the planet. Needing Big Alice in order to launch his rocket Icebreaker, Nima lays siege to New Eden. Although Nima succeeds in stealing the train at great cost, Layton and many New Eden residents board Snowpiercer in turn and foil Nima's attempts to bury the town in an avalanche. Inciting a rebellion amongst the remaining passengers, Layton, Melanie and their allies confront Nima in a final battle for the future of the planet. Although Nima realizes the error of his ways too late to stop the rocket launch, Alex's sabotage of Icebreaker prevents an apocalyptic disaster.

Afterwards, everyone decides to settle at New Eden, although it's unknown how long the warm spot will last for with data suggesting that it may not be viable forever due to the damage that CW-7 did to the atmosphere while creating it. As everyone celebrates, a patch of flowers is shown growing on a distant mountainside, suggesting that the Earth is already warming on its own and life is returning to the planet.

== Cast and characters ==
=== Main ===
- Jennifer Connelly as Melanie Cavill: The powerful Head of Hospitality (the department responsible for smooth relations) and the Voice of the Train (responsible for making the PA system's daily announcements) aboard Snowpiercer. To the majority of the train, Melanie is believed to be Mr. Wilford's representative relaying his orders to the passengers and crew. It is later revealed that Wilford was not initially aboard the Snowpiercer. Melanie has been facing the crushing burden of directing Snowpiercer on its global journey, managing mounting resource and class issues, having her authority and decisions challenged, and maintaining Wilford's iron order throughout the train to preserve the last of humanity. She desperately tries to maintain the myth of Wilford, which is known to only a few other passengers. Ultimately the secret is exposed, leading to a coup attempt by wealthy passengers from First Class. This coincides with a revolution by the Tail and Third Class sections, in which Melanie helps out in the end and saves it from certain defeat. After the revolution, Melanie officially hands leadership of the train to Layton and resumes her duties as Head Engineer, but her plans to remain indefinitely in the engine room are threatened by the arrival of Mr. Wilford and the surprise return of her believed dead daughter Alexandra. In the second season, Melanie departs Snowpiercer to find a place that humanity can recolonize. In the second-season finale, Layton and Alex discover that Melanie had sacrificed the last of her power to protect her data before seemingly walking into the Freeze to die. In season three, Melanie appears as a hallucination to both Alex and Wilford. It's eventually discovered that she had survived by taking a track scaler from a nearby hangar and using the suspension drug to keep herself in hibernation. After being rescued, she betrays Layton and seizes control of the Engine before agreeing to split the train, with Melanie leading those who want to stay onboard Snowpiercer.
- Daveed Diggs as Andre Layton: A former detective turned leader of the Tail, a group of passengers who boarded Snowpiercer by force without tickets and are treated poorly as a result, often having their food, water, and electricity cut. As the world's only surviving homicide detective, Layton is reluctantly deputized by Melanie as Snowpiercer's Train Detective to help solve a series of murders. While investigating the mysterious killings, he gathers intelligence and allies to support a revolution by the Tail and Third Class sections. After First Class has overthrown Melanie, they start to crush Layton's revolution in a series of bloody confrontations. It is saved only after Melanie teams up with Layton in the end. After the revolution's success, she officially hands the leadership of the train to Layton, but his plans to implement a democratic government are threatened by the arrival of Mr. Wilford. At the end of the second season, Layton creates his own pirate train out of the first ten cars of Snowpiercer to resist Wilford, taking with him several of his and Melanie's most trusted loyalists. At the end of the third season, Layton takes Big Alice and several people to a habitable valley in the Horn of Africa. In season four, Layton has stepped down as the leader of humanity in favor of a democratically elected government, although he still serves as an elected member of the new town council, stating that he's a wartime general, not a peacetime leader. This allows Layton to enjoy a simpler life before the murder of Zarah and the kidnapping of Liana causes Layton to step back up as the leader of humanity against a threat that endangers the remainder of life on the planet. At the end of the series, Ruth decides to share leadership of New Eden with Layton as co-chairs of the council.
- Mickey Sumner as Bess Till: A Brakeman and part of the train's security force, Till was a rookie officer in the Detroit Police Department and witnessed its self-destruction during the Freeze. She is in a romantic relationship with Jinju and later upgrades from Third to Second Class to be with her. Tormented by the injustices of the class system, however, she ultimately decides to support Layton's revolution. Because Till is afraid to share what she knows about Layton's moves, while Jinju still wants to keep her knowledge about First Class and Melanie secret, they eventually break up. After Josie, one of Layton's allies, finds him in medically induced suspension, Till helps Josie and Layton escape. She also tries but fails to save Josie from interrogation by Melanie. In season 2, Layton promotes Till to Train Detective to solve a series of crimes involving members of the Tail and the Breachmen. It is later revealed that Mr. Wilford was behind them as a way to undermine Layton's credibility and leadership. Till leaves with Layton's pirate train at the end of season 2. After the trains reconnect in season 3, she resumes her role as Train Detective, investigating Pike's attempts to assassinate Layton and forming a romantic relationship with Miss Audrey, who has been Mr. Wilford's love interest. After Big Alice separates from Snowpiercer to embark on its journey to New Eden, Till becomes the new Lead Brakemen aboard Snowpiercer.
- Alison Wright as Ruth Wardell: Melanie's deputy in Hospitality who looks after First Class passengers and delivers demands and punishments to the Tail. Before the Freeze, she ran a bed and breakfast in Kendal and was personally recruited by Mr. Wilford when he stayed there as a guest. A friend to Melanie, Ruth feels betrayed after the secret about Mr. Wilford is exposed. She becomes Head of Hospitality and is initially thrilled by Mr. Wilford's return. When questioned by Layton, she insists that her loyalty is to Snowpiercer and its passengers. She subsequently joins Layton's leadership council with Miss Audrey, Roche, Bennett Knox, and others but he is reluctant to trust her. Ruth is inadvertently left behind with Wilford after Layton creates a separate pirate train. In season 3, she becomes the leader of a resistance movement against Wilford on Snowpiercer before resuming her duties as Head of Hospitality after Layton's return. She later chooses to join him in going to New Eden where Ruth becomes the town's mayor and the chairwoman of the town council after Layton decides to step down as the leader in favor of a democratically elected government. In the series finale, Ruth decides to make Layton her council co-chair rather than continuing to lead it on her own.
- Lena Hall as Miss Audrey (seasons 1–3; recurring season 4): Chanteuse and the lead madam of Snowpiercer's Nightcar, a Third Class den of (mostly) platonic prostitution and spiritual healing. She represents Third Class before the rest of the train and is very vocal about addressing the social differences on Snowpiercer and supports Layton's revolution. In season 2, she struggles with the return of Mr. Wilford; she was once an escort who served Wilford personally for years and still feels drawn to him despite fearing that renewing their relationship would make her life worse. It is later revealed that the two have a sadomasochistic relationship with Miss Audrey being the dominant party. She later defects to Wilford's side, helping him against rival factions. When Layton creates a separate pirate train, she is taken hostage by his crew to ensure the safety of Zarah, who was pregnant and stayed behind on Wilford's part of the train. After Snowpiercer was reconnected, Audrey is exiled to Third Class and banned from the Nightcar. She eventually forms a romantic relationship with Till who helps her move past Wilford and begin helping people again.
- Iddo Goldberg as Bennett Knox: One of Snowpiercer's engineers, he has inside knowledge of the initial absence of Mr. Wilford and knows the deepest secrets of the train. He is fiercely loyal to Melanie, with whom he is romantically involved. When Mr. Wilford returns, he betrays Melanie as he believes that Snowpiercer would not survive without the supplies onboard Wilford's Big Alice. At the same time, he allies with Layton to protect the train together in Melanie's absence. He subsequently acts as part of Layton's leadership council. Bennett was in on Melanie's plot to steal Snowpiercer in the first place unlike his colleague Javi, another train engineer, and stresses that they had to depart the station before Wilford boards the train and more people get killed, even though Melanie's daughter had not arrived yet and would miss the train if it leaves. In season two, Bennett joins Layton's pirate train. At the end of season three, Bennett chooses to remain on Snowpiercer with Melanie rather than going to New Eden. In "The Engineer", Bennett dies when he sacrifices himself to separate Snowpiercer and Big Alice via manual override, freezing to death in the process. Subsequently, the passengers carve an inscription over the Big Alice helm to honor Bennett and his sacrifice. Bennett's friends are shown to take his sacrifice very hard.
- Susan Park as Jinju Seong (season 1): Snowpiercer's agricultural officer from Second Class and a member of the train's elite. She has been in a romantic relationship with Bess and has inside knowledge of Mr. Wilford's initial absence. After the revolution, she and Bess break up.
- Katie McGuinness as Josie Wellstead: A strong, no-nonsense Tailie, she cares for Miles and other children in the tail, and uses training from her time as a veterinarian before the Freeze to treat the sick or injured. She is Andre's love interest after Zarah departs from the tail. She has been part of the uprisings in the tail and takes great risks on behalf of her community. She is later thought to have been frozen to death after trying to kill Melanie who tortured her. In the second season, it is revealed that she has survived, albeit severely injured. Receiving treatment from the Headwoods, Wilford's scientists on Big Alice, Josie becomes resistant to extremely cold temperatures like Icy Bob and receives a new prosthetic hand. She later uses her new ability to help Layton escape and joins him and others on the pirate train. In the third season, Josie has a brief fling with Bennett Knox. When the time comes to reconnect the pirate train with the rest of Snowpiercer and Big Alice, she uses her new ability to help Layton again. She later decides to join others in going to New Eden.
- Sam Otto as John "Oz" Osweiller: A young Brakeman and Bess's patrol partner as part of the train's security team. He is less scrupulous than Bess in dealing with the passengers. Oz was raised by a single mother who was a prostitute and emotionally distant from him. He references being in pain from "everything", which is also his rationale for taking Kronole, a street drug likely derived from the medication used for the suspension of life. During Layton's revolution, Oz abandons his job with the Brakemen. He begins a relationship with LJ and becomes the head of janitorial after the assassination of Terence. In season three, during Audrey's absence, he and LJ run the Night Car together as a bar and eventually get married. However, LJ remains deeply committed to her own machinations to rise to the top again, one time even threatening Oz when he appears reluctant to support her. Oz later leaves LJ to join the colonization of New Eden. After initially becoming a recluse and a hermit, Oz accepts an offer from Roche to serve as a security officer for New Eden, taking over for Roche after he mysteriously vanishes during a blizzard. Oz eventually discovers that the mysterious voice he keeps hearing isn't LJ's ghost but rather Buffalo, the Animal Squad Engineer, who was spying on the town.
- Sheila Vand as Zarah Fahrami (seasons 1–3; guest season 4): Layton's ex-wife who, unable to adjust to the poverty of the Tail, left to become a bartender in the Nightcar, antagonizing other Tailies and breaking Layton's heart in the process. She later becomes pregnant with Layton's child. After the revolution, she tries to build a new life with him. In the second season, she joins Hospitality to bridge the gap between Layton and Ruth Wardell. When Layton creates a separate pirate train, Zarah decides to remain behind, feeling that she is safer there and that Wilford would not dare to hurt her due to her pregnancy. She allows Wilford's scientists to perform an experimental procedure to augment her baby with resistance to extremely low temperatures. In season three, she gives birth to Liana Layton. In the season 4 premiere, she is thrown off of a cliff to her death by Rat, one of Milius' men, when he kidnaps Liana with the help of Dr. Headwood. However, both Headwood and Milius claim that Zarah's death was unintentional. Her death is later avenged when Layton kills Rat in the series finale with Boki's help.
- Roberto Urbina as Javier "Javi" de la Torre: One of Snowpiercer's engineers, he is aware of Mr. Wilford's initial absence from the train and often questions the morality of Melanie's decisions. In addition to keeping the train running, Javi uses computer algorithms and hacked satellites to predict the environment surrounding and ahead of Snowpiercer. During the coup by First Class, Javi sides with the Folgers at first but eventually betrays them and rescues Melanie. Following the aborted coup and the successful Tailie revolution, Javi, Bennett, and Melanie try but fail to prevent Mr. Wilford from taking over Snowpiercer. After Wilford joins his Big Alice with Snowpiercer and takes control of both trains, Melanie departs on a mission to collect atmospheric data and model the re-warming of Earth. During a struggle to stop the trains in time to pick up Melanie as she returns, Javi is mauled by Wilford's dog, Jupiter, and Wilford can prevent the trains from stopping. Javi survives but is left traumatized and under Wilford's control. Throughout the third season, Javi battles post-traumatic stress disorder with the help of Sykes. He later joins Layton in going to New Eden where he serves as a member of the town council and he appears to be developing a budding romantic relationship with Sykes.
- Mike O'Malley as Sam Roche: Snowpiercer's lead Brakeman who is a former police officer and Wilford's security officer before the Freeze. As the train's chief law enforcement officer, he tried to maintain the train's order, but ended up respecting and allying with Layton, and ultimately decided to support Layton's revolution. He and his wife, Anne, and one of his three children survived the Freeze. In season 2, he works with Layton and his former subordinate Bess Till to maintain order in the wake of Wilford's return. He is one of Layton's leadership council alongside Ruth Wardell, Miss Audrey, and Bennett Knox following Melanie's departure from the train. Near the end of season 2, he is placed in the Drawers on Big Alice along with his family. After Layton's return in season 3, he is rescued by Till and Dr. Pelton, but they discover that Anne had died at some point during their time in the Drawers. Roche subsequently struggles to deal with his grief and anger over Anne's death. Roche and his daughter choose to join the people going to New Eden at the end of the season. At New Eden, Roche serves as the head of security and a member of the town council before mysteriously vanishing in a blizzard. Roche later reappears, revealing that he was captured by Milius' forces, but he managed to escape in the chaos started by Layton and Wilford.
- Annalise Basso as Lilah Jr. "LJ" Folger-Osweiller (season 1–3): The isolated teenage daughter of Lilah and Robert, she lives uptrain with her parents in First Class, surrounded by luxury. Appearing to be quiet and diligent, she is later revealed as a murderous psychopath and sadist, and the mastermind behind the serial murders on Snowpiercer committed by her bodyguard and boyfriend Erik Sotto. She is exposed by Layton, arrested, and found guilty in a tribunal, but her acquittal on Melanie's order makes her one of the most hated First Class train passengers. Following the death of both of her parents in the revolution, the orphaned and defenseless LJ is evicted from First Class by Pike and is now surviving in Third Class with Oz, both of them hated by the train's passengers. LJ reluctantly takes on a janitorial job and bonds with Alex Cavill. She eventually starts dating Oz. In season 3, she and Oz run the Night Car together and continue their relationship. In "The Last to Go", the two get married. In "The Original Sinners", after Oz leaves her for New Eden, LJ accidentally chokes to death on her father's glass eye.
- Jaylin Fletcher as Miles (season 1; guest seasons 2–3; recurring season 4): A Tailie child, whose parents and sister were left behind to die in the Freeze when their refugee group invaded the train, leaving him to be raised primarily by Andre and Josie – the rest of the Tail refer to him as "Miles and Miles" (implying no one is aware of his surname). Whip-smart and talented, his brilliant intelligence wins him a coveted apprenticeship that allows him to move up the train to Second Class. He is later fast-track appointed an Engine Apprentice by Melanie. He plays a pivotal role in the revolution, revealing the truth about Melanie's deception to LJ Folger and working with Bennett, Melanie, and Layton to kill the Folgers and their army by detaching seven cars from the train. In season 2, Miles is revealed to be working on engineering life systems and dreams of being one of the first people to recolonize the planet. In season 3, he visits Josie, is revealed to have continued his apprenticeship, and suggests the solution for settling the dispute between Layton and Pike. When the trains separate, Miles remains with Snowpiercer to continue training as an Engineer with Melanie and Bennett, resuming working in the Engine with them in the absence of Javi. In season 4, Miles serves as the sole Engineer on Big Alice following the escape from the Silo and settles in New Eden with his adoptive parents. Gabriel Jacob-Cross portrays young Miles during flashbacks in season 1 while Ezra Benedict Agbonkhese portrays him in season 4.
- Steven Ogg as Pike (seasons 2–3; recurring season 1): A Tailie, who was a career convict, serving time in Cook County Jail for armed robbery at the time of the Freeze, but escaped. He is respected as a hardened and battle-scarred leader in the Tail, and a warrior of his people, though he often acts as a renegade, out for whatever he can get and has shifting loyalties. In season 2, he starts an illicit trade between the two trains which Layton agrees to allow under his supervision. After assassinating Terence on Layton's orders, Pike suffers something of a breakdown out of guilt. In season 3, he assists Ruth Wardell in running the resistance on Snowpiercer in Layton's absence. After attempting to assassinate Layton, Pike is stabbed to death by him in a fight to the death in "Born to Bleed". He subsequently reappears as a priest in Layton's coma dream in "Ouroboros".
- Rowan Blanchard as Alexandra "Alex" Cavill (seasons 2–4; guest season 1): Melanie's daughter and Big Alice's Engineer, who was believed to have died in the Freeze when her mother was forced to leave her behind when Snowpiercer left Chicago seven years ago. In the season 1 finale, Alex returns aboard Big Alice. She spent seven years on Big Alice as Wilford's dedicated protégée. Wilford had also manipulated her into hating Melanie, her mother, by convincing her that Melanie "stole" the train and left her behind. Upon their reunification, Alex and her mother slowly began to rekindle their relationship. Alex also starts becoming friendly with LJ Folger despite their differing loyalties. Alex eventually abandons Wilford and joins Layton's pirate train. After reuniting with her mother in season 3, she decides to join Layton in going to New Eden rather than remaining on Snowpiercer with Melanie. In season 4, it is revealed that Dr. Nima Rousseau, the man who ended the world, is her biological father, having served as a sperm donor for Melanie. Grace Sunar portrays young Alexandra Cavill during flashbacks in seasons 1–3.
- Sean Bean as Joseph Wilford (seasons 2–4; uncredited season 1): An eccentric billionaire and genius inventor, Mr. Wilford is the powerful creator of Snowpiercer, worshipped as a Messiah-like figure who used his company, Wilford Industries, to refit his luxury liner train, "Wilford's Dreamliner" and its global railway into an ark, Snowpiercer, to save a small population from the Freeze (though in truth Melanie performed the engineering work to do so, and he claimed the credit). Initially believed to be the mysterious and reclusive Head Engineer of the train represented solely by Melanie, it is later revealed that he was not actually aboard Snowpiercer, with Melanie only maintaining the illusion that he was. After the secret was revealed, wealthy passengers from First Class attempted a coup, and the Tail and Third Class began a revolution. In the season 1 finale, after the revolution, Wilford returns in control of a secondary supply train, Big Alice, and docks with Snowpiercer. Throughout Season 2, Wilford's actions result in him gaining support from Snowpiercer's passengers, eventually retaking control after fixing the train. In the end, he remains in control of Big Alice and the rest of Snowpiercer after Layton creates a Pirate Train to rescue Melanie. In Season 3, Layton regains control over Snowpiercer and Big Alice, confining Wilford to Big Alice's Brig. Following an attack, Wilford is transferred to Snowpiercer's Library. During Layton and Melanie's Civil War, Wilford escapes, gathers his remaining supporters, and attempts to regain control. However, Layton and Melanie join forces to stop Wilford, exiling him from Snowpiercer and sending him off on a track scaler. A year later, Wilford is revealed to have been rescued by the International Peacekeeping Forces and working in their bunker. In "A Moth to a Flame", Wilford is cornered by Layton and, with no way out, he commits suicide by smoking a poison blunt.
- Chelsea Harris as Sykes (seasons 3–4; recurring season 2): Mr. Wilford's head of security aboard Big Alice, Sykes keeps her secrets and is loyal to Wilford. At the end of the second season, Sykes is captured by Bennett Knox and remains a prisoner onboard Layton's pirate train. In season 3, she has joined the crew, stating that she is doing her part as a prisoner of war. However, her loyalty to Wilford appears to be wavering and she is left to roam free by Layton after he retakes Snowpiercer. She later bonds with Javi over their mutual trauma from dealing with Wilford, revealing that her scars also come from an attack by Wilford's dog Jupiter. When the trains separate, Sykes joins Layton in going to New Eden. In season 4, she is running food production in New Eden and appears to have a budding romantic relationship with Javi.
- Archie Panjabi as Asha (season 3): A survivor discovered by Layton in a nuclear power plant in North Korea. In "Born to Bleed", Asha tells Pike that she's Indian and has lived in England. In "Setting Itself Right", she sacrifices herself to save Snowpiercer from a cloud of toxic volcanic gas.
- Clark Gregg as Admiral Milius (season 4): The leader of the International Peacekeeping Forces who pose a threat to Snowpiercer and New Eden. In "A Moth to a Flame", he is overpowered by Wilford and left to freeze to death on a frozen level, Wilford having received Headwood's cold treatment.
- Michael Aronov as Dr. Nima Rousseau (season 4): A brilliant chemist and former colleague of Melanie Cavill's from MIT who leads an international research team dedicated to ending the Freeze. In "A Moth to a Flame", Nima is revealed to be the man who created CW-7 and caused the Freeze in the first place. In "Dominant Traits," he is revealed to be Alex's biological father, having served as a sperm donor for Melanie. In the series finale, Nima dies after deliberately exposing himself to the Freeze that he caused upon finally recognizing and understanding the mistakes that he had made.

=== Recurring ===
- Happy Anderson as Dr. Henry Klimpt (season 1): A research scientist-turned-doctor living in Second Class. He oversees those unfortunate enough to be sentenced to the coffin-like Drawers. He later supports Layton's revolution.
- Kerry O'Malley as Lilah Folger Sr. (season 1): A First Class passenger who knew Mr. Wilford before the Freeze, and a former corporate lawyer from old money, who is fiercely protective of her own, particularly her daughter LJ and the rest of First Class, with whom she shares a vested interest in maintaining their security and privilege. Matriarch of one of First's leading families, she regularly makes complaints to Hospitality about things like etiquette in the sauna, and questions Melanie's authority when things do not go her way, though will not go so far as to challenge Wilford himself. When it is discovered Wilford is not aboard, Lilah is amongst those who position themselves to lead the new regime governing the train. She, along with her husband, are both presumed dead after the penultimate episode of season 1 when Layton, Melanie, Bennett, and Miles cut seven cars loose.
- Timothy V. Murphy as Nolan Grey (season 1; guest season 2): The commander of Snowpiercer's Jackboots security force, he is a brilliant tactician and a hardened Special Forces leader, who commanded men in the British SAS before the Freeze. He relishes keeping things in order and getting his hands dirty in combat. He is presumed dead after the penultimate episode of season 1 when Layton, Melanie, Bennett, and Miles cut seven cars loose. In the second season, he reappears in flashbacks to the night the train was boarded.
- Aaron Glenane as the Last Australian (seasons 1–2): A Tailie, and scrappy charmer from Perth with an intense desire to survive and have children because, as far as he knows, he is the last Australian. It's revealed that his real name is Murray, although no one calls him that. In season 2, Murray learns that he is not the last Australian as there is another Australian aboard Big Alice, Emilia, who had also believed herself to be the last. In season 3, it's mentioned that he had died of influenza during the six months that Layton was away.
- William Stanford Davis as Mr. Riggs (season 1): A Tailie and devout religious man, and one of Layton's friends. He dies in the penultimate episode of season 1 when Layton, Melanie, Bennett, and Miles cut seven cars loose; Layton not having enough time to rescue his imprisoned friends.
- Renée Victor as Mama Grandé (seasons 1–2): A Tailie who speaks almost no English, and is Santiago's grandmother. She survives her grandson's death in the revolution and chooses to remain in the Tail. In season 3, it's mentioned that she had died of influenza during the six months that Layton was away.
- Vincent Gale as Robert Folger (season 1): A First Class passenger who knew Mr. Wilford before the Freeze, who is convinced that First Class is essential for the wellbeing of Snowpiercer, and that Third Class and the Tail Section are dispensable. He takes advantage of the revelation of Melanie's impersonation of Wilford to lead a coup attempt to remove her from her position, an act leading to Leyton's revolution. He, along with his wife, are both killed in the penultimate episode of season 1 when Layton, Melanie, Bennett, and Miles cut seven cars loose. Robert has a glass eye stemming from his daughter poking out his real eye during a temper tantrum which LJ accidentally chokes to death on at the end of season 3.
- Jonathan Lloyd Walker as Big John (season 1): A Tailie who works in Sanitation along with others from the Tail; work that is harsh slave-like labor. He is killed in the revolution.
- Miranda Edwards as Lights: A Tailie and electronics expert. Following the revolution, she runs her own shop in the markets which is seen several times in season 3.
- Kurt Ostlund as Strong Boy (seasons 1–2; guest season 3): A Tailie, a mute young man who takes part in the failed revolution. As a result, he is locked in the Drawers. Strong Boy is later rescued by the Last Australian and inexplicably can speak Mandarin upon revival. He aids Layton against Commander Grey in the revolution and survives to enjoy the benefits. In season 2, he begins regaining the ability to speak English. In season 3, six months later, he has regained the ability to speak English completely and serves in Ruth's resistance. He is tortured to death by Kevin McMahon in "The First Blow", but he reappears in the form of Pike's nightmare in "Born to Bleed".
- Kwasi Thomas as "Z-Wreck": A Tailie who is imprisoned in the Drawers following the failed revolution. He is later rescued by the Last Australian and comes to Layton and Roche's rescue along with Strong Boy. In season 3, he is shown to be running a speakeasy in the Third Class market. In season 4, his real name is revealed to be Zachariah.
- Ian Collins as Tristan: A First Class passenger and Ruth's assistant. After Ruth joins the journey to New Eden in season 3, he becomes the new Head of Hospitality.
- Emma Oliver as Winnipeg "Winnie" (seasons 1–3; guest season 4): A Tailie child, the daughter of Suzanne and the sister of Patterson. Winnie takes part in the failed revolution by using a severed hand to open a door, resulting in her mother being punished by having her whole arm frozen off. Winnie ends up losing both her mother and brother as a result of the revolutions. In season 2, she has been adopted by Lights and often helps by running messages and other small tasks for Layton, something that she continues doing during Layton's absence in season 3. It's mentioned in the third season that she was born on the train and that she was named after the closest city as part of a Tailie naming tradition.
- Fiona Vroom as Mary-Elizabeth Gillies (seasons 1, 3; guest seasons 2, 4): A primary teacher aboard Snowpiercer who lives in Second Class, she is an encouraging and well-rounded school teacher who is responsible for educating Snowpiercer's next generation. A juror on the LJ Folger tribunal, she later supports Layton's revolution. She chooses to remain onboard Snowpiercer when the trains separate and she is seen holding hands with Dr. Pelton, suggesting a possible relationship between the two women.
- Karin Konoval as Dr. Pelton: Snowpiercer's physician who lives in Second Class, a friendly doctor who finds herself caught up in the politics and machinations aboard the train. She later supports Layton's revolution, hiding him and Josie and treating the wounded. In season 2, she remains one of Layton's most trusted supporters and is often seen representing Second Class in discussions. In season 3, she helps the revolution in Layton's absence as well as treating Layton's injuries and delivering his daughter Liana, leading her to clash with Mrs. Headwood over her unethical experiments. When the trains separate, she chooses to remain on Snowpiercer and is seen holding hands with Miss Gillies, suggesting a possible relationship between the two women.
- Shaun Toub as Terence (seasons 1–2): The head janitor aboard Snowpiercer who lives in Third Class, he is a charming, conniving, and ultimately dangerous janitor-turned-gangster who rules the Black Market with an enigmatic power, inspiring fierce loyalty in his army of minions. He is killed by Pike under Layton's orders for threatening Josie's safety.
- Aleks Paunovic as Bojan "Boki" Boscovic (seasons 2, 4; guest seasons 1, 3): The leader of Snowpiercer's Breachmen, one of the most dangerous jobs on the train, he has a large and fearsome appearance; with frostbite scars and stumped ears, but is upbeat and jokes about the cold and the hazards of the job. His loyalty to Mr. Wilford becomes a problem for Layton and his fragile democracy after his return. Boki reveals that he has been working for Wilford since he was fourteen years old and has a hard time believing Wilford would betray his trust, even after the other Breachmen are murdered. After repairing Wilford's sabotage of the train, seeing Wilford's betrayal with his own eyes, he defects to Layton's side completely. He is apparently killed in the second-season finale when the Aquarium Car is destroyed. At the end of the third season, he's revealed to have survived the explosion and has been nursed back to health by Mrs. Headwood as Wilford's new cold man with the added effect that he is now impervious to pain. However, he appears to be mute and brainwashed into serving Wilford again. When the trains separate, both Boki and Mrs. Headwood join Big Alice in going to New Eden. In season 4, he has recovered from his brainwashing and is no longer mute, once again serving as one of Layton's trusted friends and allies.
- Sakina Jaffrey as Mrs. Headwood (seasons 2–4): An eccentric scientist on Big Alice alongside her husband, and often debates with him about Mr. Wilford's agenda as they work on secret experiments on his behalf. After Wilford's defeat in season 3, she continues her work, but she clashes on several occasions with Layton and Dr. Pelton over her experiments on Layton's unborn daughter Liana. Alongside Boki, she accompanies Big Alice to New Eden at the end of the third season. In season 4, she betrays New Eden and works with Milius' forces.
- Damian Young as Mr. Headwood (season 2): An eccentric scientist on Big Alice alongside his wife, working on illicit experiments regarding the Freeze. In "The Last to Go", he is mentioned to have died of influenza. Throughout the rest of the series, his wife is shown carrying his shoes around as a memento.
- Tom Lipinski as Kevin McMahon (season 2; guest season 3): Big Alice's Head of Hospitality, and his loyalty to Mr. Wilford knows no bounds. Briefly captured and held as a POW by Layton and the rebels after being captured during a failed raid on Big Alice, he is released in exchange for Melanie, and is compelled by Wilford to commit suicide as an act of loyalty after giving up information on Big Alice's crew. It's later revealed that he's still alive. After Layton retakes the train, he is stabbed to death by LJ Folger for his murder of Strong Boy so that she can be on the winning side of the revolution.
- Andre Tricoteux as Icy Bob (season 2): A hulking brute aboard Big Alice, Icy Bob is Mr. Wilford's greatest and most fearsome weapon. However, he does not appear to be unsympathetic to Snowpiercer's plight, keeping quiet about Josie's spying. After sabotaging Snowpiercer's water intakes in "The Eternal Engineer", Icy Bob suffers injuries from the cold beyond even his ability to survive and he dies.
- Bryan Terrell Clark as Pastor Logan (season 2): A priest on Snowpiercer who counsels Bess Till over her struggles following the revolution. He is eventually revealed to be a Wilford supporter and his mole on Snowpiercer. After being exposed, Pastor Logan commits suicide by purposefully exposing his head to the outside air.
- Georgina Haig as Emilia (season 2): A seamstress and Alex's friend aboard Big Alice, Emilia is an Australian native of Perth who thought she was the only Australian until she met Murray on Snowpiercer. In season 3, it's mentioned that she had died of influenza during the six months that Layton was away.
- Esther Ming Li as Carly Roche (season 3; guest seasons 2, 4): Sam and Anne's teenage daughter who later befriends Alex. Alongside her father, she accompanies Layton to New Eden at the end of the third season.
- Herschel Andoh as Wolf (season 4): A heavily scarred member of Animal Squad who has a wolf painted onto his helmet. Following Milius' death, he becomes the squad's de facto leader. At the end of the series, he is killed by Oz, who bashes Wolf to death.
- Noah Crawford as Rat (season 4): A particularly brutal member of Animal Squad who has a rat painted onto his helmet. While kidnapping Liana Layton, he murdered Zarah Ferami, leading Layton on a path of vengeance. During the battle for New Eden, Rat is apparently killed by Bess Till, only to be revived by Mrs. Headwood in the series finale. In a final confrontation, Rat is killed by Layton with the help of Boki.
- Olga Zippa as Buffalo (season 4): The Irish engineer of Animal Squad who has a Buffalo painted on her helmet and serves as the mostly silent driver of Snowpiercer during Milius and Nima's control of the train. It's later revealed that Buffalo is the source of the mysterious voice and Gaelic singing that Oz has been hearing in the hills near New Eden, something that he had attributed to the ghost of LJ Folger. At the end of the series, Buffalo is the last surviving member of Animal Squad and is allowed to move to New Eden, where she befriends Oz and Boki whom she informs that she is just an engineer and wasn't a fan of Milius.

=== Guest ===
- Mark Margolis as Old Ivan (season 1): A Russian Tailie, the oldest person on Snowpiercer, Layton's mentor and a longstanding, respected member of the Tail. After celebrating his 84th birthday (possibly making him the oldest man left on Earth), he hangs himself, causing the Tail to revolt. In season 4, the Old Ivan Library in New Eden is named in his honor.
- Madeleine Arthur as Nicolette "Nikki" Genêt (season 1): A Third Class passenger who was believed to be behind the first Snowpiercer murder and was locked in the Drawers as a result. With the new round of murders, she is released as a witness but remains in a catatonic state. She is later murdered by Erik Sotto, but she appears in one of Layton's nightmares while Layton is in the Drawers.
- Stephen Lobo as Martin Colvin (seasons 1, 3–4): A First Class passenger who warns Melanie about the Folgers' planned revolution. He later supports Layton's revolution, by secretly providing them with a gun, as Martin does not want the Folgers or Commander Grey to take over the train. In season 3, he is a part of the crew of the pirate train, having inadvertently stowed away aboard. He later betrays Layton and the others onboard but is knocked unconscious after Bess hits him over the head. He is not seen again until season 4 where he's revealed to have remained as a passenger aboard Snowpiercer when the trains separated. After helping to stop the launch of Gemini, he moves to New Eden.
- Matt Murray as Erik Sotto (season 1): A First Class private security officer and former Marine, who was hired to be the bodyguard of the Folger family during the Freeze. He is LJ's boyfriend and acts as the muscle of the Snowpiercer serial killing team before being killed himself by Jackboots.
- Dylan Schmid as Patterson (season 1): A Tailie young man, Suzanne's son and Winnie's older brother. After the failed revolution, his mother gets her arm frozen off and ultimately dies of infection, leaving Patterson to lead the family. He dies in the Nightcar battle in Layton's revolution.
- Sarah Strange as Suzanne (season 1): A Tailie and the mother of Patterson and Winnie, whose arm is frozen off as punishment for her daughter's role in the failed revolution. Despite her son and Josie's efforts, Suzanne later dies of an infection from her lost arm.
- Manoj Sood as Rajiv Sharma (seasons 1–2, 4): A First Class passenger and chair of their committee (though he has no real authority). In season 4, he is one of the people who has moved to New Eden.
- Yee Jee Tso as York Lam (seasons 1–2): A First Class passenger and Martin's husband.
- Ellie Harvie as The Notary: A woman whose job is to oversee the recording of all events on Snowpiercer. As part of this job, she oversees the executions of captured revolutionaries but aids Jinju's plan to rescue Melanie by buying her and Javi time to get Melanie out. In season 4, she is one of the people who has moved to New Eden.
- Michel Issa Rubio as Santiago (seasons 1, 4): A Tailie, Mama Grandé's grandson and one of Layton's friends. He dies in the penultimate episode of season 1 when Layton, Melanie, Bennett, and Miles cut seven cars loose; Layton not having enough time to rescue his imprisoned friends. In season 4, he appears in a flashback scene in "North Star".
- Tom Kirk as Clay (season 1): A Third Class passenger and bartender working in the Nightcar beside Audrey and Zarah. He dies in the penultimate episode of season 1 when Layton, Melanie, Bennett, and Miles cut seven cars loose; Layton not having enough time to rescue his imprisoned friends.
- Brent Stait as Jakes Carter (seasons 1–3): A Tunnelman in Snowpiercer's undercarriage and one of Wilford's most loyal supporters.
- Amanda Brugel as Eugenia (seasons 1–2): A First Class passenger who initially invested $400 million to build Snowpiercer. She is later one of the assassins who murders the Breachmen. After taking control of Snowpiercer, Wilford executes Eugenia and the other assassins by having them breathe in outside air.
- Kelly-Ruth Mercier as Annie: One of the janitors working for Terence in Third Class. She is one of Wilford's supporters and she later moves to New Eden.
- Jane McGregor as Astrid: A former Tailie who was able to move uptrain years before, as she was chosen for an apprenticeship. Now living in Third Class, and working in Snowpiercer's Food Processing, she maintains her loyalty to the Tail and aids in preparing for the revolution. In season 2, she is now assisting Dr. Pelton in treating the wounded after the revolution. In season 3, she acts as the head of food processing after Layton retakes the train and she joins the journey to New Eden.
- Gary Hetherington as Walter Flemming (season 1): A Third Class passenger and papermaker aboard Snowpiercer. A juror on the LJ Folger tribunal, he later supports Layton's revolution and is executed for his actions.
- Elaine Kao as Anne Roche (seasons 2–3): Sam's wife, who is ambivalent about supporting Layton, and considers supporting Wilford. She is later discovered to have died in the Drawers during her six months trapped there.
- Kristian Bruun as Stu Whiggins (seasons 3–4): A former First Class passenger turned Jackboot, Oz describes Stu as having no skills and often spends his time in the Nightcar. In season 4, Stu's severed hand is found near New Eden shortly before the disappearance of Sam Roche as Stu had helped Milius' forces to identify their targets before trying to escape.
- Sumalee Montano as Kari Chang (season 4): The original admiral of the International Peacekeeping Forces who was usurped by Milius and leads a group of survivors on an isolated level of the Silo. She later helps Layton and Wilford escape, allowing them to take down Milius.

== Episodes ==
=== Series overview ===
Season	Episodes	Originally released		
Season	Episodes	First released	Last released	Network
1	10	May 17, 2020	July 12, 2020	TNT
2	10	January 25, 2021	March 29, 2021	TNT
3	10	January 24, 2022	March 28, 2022	TNT
4	10	July 21, 2024	September 22, 2024	AMC

=== Season 1 (2020) ===
No. overall	No. in season	Title	Directed by	Teleplay by	Original release date	U.S. viewers (millions)
1	1	"First, the Weather Changed"	James Hawes	Graeme Manson; Television story by : Josh Friedman and Graeme Manson	May 17, 2020	1.94
To reverse global warming, chemicals are released into Earth's atmosphere to make the planet cooler. The plan backfires and freezes most of the inhabitable world. Seven years later, the last remaining humans live onboard the train Snowpiercer, constructed by a mysterious Mr. Wilford with funding from a small group of elites and hundreds of ticket buyers. Some passengers have forced their way aboard the train without tickets, however. Called "Tailies," they now live in the tail end of the train where deteriorating conditions have prompted them to repeatedly rebel. Tailie Andre Layton is called by Melanie Cavill, the public announcer or Voice of the Train, to help solve a murder because he used to be a homicide detective. Layton, while trying to negotiate better conditions for his class, is reunited with his ex-wife Zarah, who is one of the suspects. After a Tailie's suicide, the rest of the group revolt but are talked down by Layton who agrees to help solve the murder. He also plans to infiltrate the front of the train to recruit more allies and plan for the next rebellion. Melanie later takes over driving Snowpiercer; she is actually acting in Mr. Wilford's place.
2	2	"Prepare to Brace"	Sam Miller	Donald Joh	May 24, 2020	1.16
Snowpiercer encounters rough tracks in the former Yukon Territory, triggering avalanches. Meanwhile, the Tailie rebellion's leaders are put into stasis, and Ruth oversees the punishment of the young girl, Winnipeg, for her involvement. However, her mother, Suzanne, stands up and offers her own arm instead. The Jackboots wet her arm and put it through a hole in the train's car to the outside, where the temperature is minus 137 degrees Celsius. It freezes instantly and is then smashed by a hammer as punishment. In the Drawer car, Nikki is removed from stasis but has trouble waking up. Aided by Till, Layton begins investigating the latest murder, theorizing that the train's butchers have been cannibalizing the dead and serving them as food to the passengers. As Snowpiercer passes through a rough set of mountainous tracks, an avalanche hits it, and the windows of the cattle car are shattered, freezing the last cows on Earth and some butchers. The damage and losses led to supply chain shortages and rolling blackouts. Layton later realizes that the murder victim was an informant for Mr. Wilford. Melanie and others who knew about Mr. Wilford's absence become concerned about what the informant might have revealed under torture before he was killed.
3	3	"Access Is Power"	Sam Miller	Lizzie Mickery	May 31, 2020	1.22
As unrest grows, Melanie organizes a fight night as a distraction with a promise to upgrade the winner to Second Class, but the fight turns into a riot that must be broken up. Layton learns that the murder victim, Sean, was investigating the black market drug Kronole, which has been present in the tail for some time. He discovers that the drug is a street variant of the suspension drug used to put people into stasis. It is supplied by the train's doctor. With the help of Zarah, Layton arranges a meeting with Terrence, the head of janitorial and the black market, who describes to him a First Class passenger in close contact with Sean right before the murder. Layton later visits and kisses Josie, secretly passing her an implant that grants access to many parts of the train. The still-recovering Nikki is visited by a man matching Terence's description of the killer.
4	4	"Without Their Maker"	Frederick E. O. Toye	Hiram Martinez	June 7, 2020	1.19
Nikki is murdered by the man who had visited her. He is now on the loose. With the border between different parts of the train closed due to the riot, he is trapped in Third Class. Layton tries to enlist Third Class into his revolution while the killer is identified as Erik, the bodyguard for the Folger family. Layton fears that First Class will shield Erik from legal proceedings and punishment. Melanie, who is revealed to have also come from humble beginnings, appears willing to help Layton bring Erik to justice. As Layton investigates Erik's connection to the Folger family, he realizes that LJ Folger is the true mastermind behind Erik's actions. After a chase, Erik is killed by the Jackboots while LJ is arrested. At the same time, Josie uses the implant Layton gave her to sneak her way from the Tail forward and make contact with Astrid, a former Tailie, to ask her for help. Layton deduces Mr. Wilford's absence during his interactions with First Class and Melanie. As a result, Melanie drugs him and has him secretly placed into stasis.
5	5	"Justice Never Boarded"	Frederick E. O. Toye	Chinaka Hodge	June 14, 2020	1.18
Till moves to Second Class after she and Jinju marry. In the Drawers, Layton has nightmares about stopping the cannibal gangs that used to terrorize the Tail. LJ's tribunal begins. Audrey successfully petitions Melanie to make the jury include a representative from the Third Class in addition to those from First and Second. The Folger family plots a mutiny against Mr. Wilford, but loyal first class passenger Martin Colvin warns Melanie. At the tribunal, LJ paints herself as a victim of Erik and hints that she has learned about secrets regarding the stasis Drawers from the murder victims. Though the jury unanimously finds LJ guilty, "Mr. Wilford" intervenes to commute her sentence. LJ promises Melanie that since Mr. Wilford has intervened to help her, she will keep the secrets she has learned. Meanwhile, Josie enlists the help of Terrence to search for Layton. Terrence abandons her after stealing drugs from Medical, but Josie finally locates Layton's drawer. Till and Oz find Josie during their patrol, but at the last minute Till betrays Oz and helps Josie and Layton escape. The two seek out Zarah for help.
6	6	"Trouble Comes Sideways"	Helen Shaver	Aubrey Nealon & Tina de la Torre	June 21, 2020	0.96
A recovering Layton is taken to Dr. Pelton by Josie. There turns out to be a blacklist for the Drawers, people Pelton believes to be enemies of the state targeted for imprisonment, a list which contains Layton, Josie and her. A short-circuit damages Snowpiercer's hydraulics and places the train in danger of derailing on a canyon bridge; Melanie fixes the problem, saving Snowpiercer from destruction. During these events, Layton confronts Melanie with the intention of killing her. However, she reveals that the Drawers are not a prison, but a lifeboat for four hundred specially selected people in case order breaks down and stasis is the only chance of the human race surviving. Layton is forced to let Melanie go so she can save Snowpiercer and ends up having sex with Josie, to whom he reveals the truth about Melanie. Oz blackmails Till into giving him free rein to abuse the passengers, but their near-death experience causes her to refuse to follow his demands further; after Suzanne's death, the Tail sets up a projector to see the outside world. Melanie takes an interest in Miles's developing skill as an engineer and states that Mr. Wilford needs a favor from him.
7	7	"The Universe Is Indifferent"	Helen Shaver	Donald Joh	June 28, 2020	1.20
Melanie promotes Miles to Engineer Apprentice to replace the man killed stopping the derailment and he is taken by Melanie to work in the Engine itself; when Josie makes contact with him, Miles promises to do his part in the upcoming rebellion. The Folgers and Commander Grey enlist Ruth in their own revolution; though Ruth tries to warn Melanie, Melanie brushes her off, causing Ruth to seemingly change her mind. Melanie embarks on a brutal campaign to find Layton, threatening Zarah into revealing that Josie helped Layton escape. Melanie brutally tortures Josie for information before she escapes her bonds with the help of a sympathetic Till; during the fight that follows, Josie freezes to death when outside air fills the room while Melanie escapes and is shown to be struggling with her ruthless actions. Layton reveals the truth about Melanie to the leaders of Third that Audrey trusts, although Terrence refuses to help either Layton or Melanie. After learning of Josie's death from Till, Layton approaches LJ for help, offering to tell her the dirtiest secret on the train.
8	8	"These Are His Revolutions"	Everardo Gout	Tina de la Torre; Television story by : Hiram Martinez & Tina de la Torre	July 5, 2020	1.14
Miles shows LJ the truth about Melanie; after LJ informs her parents, Ruth turns on Melanie and imprisons her to await execution. Miles and Bennett are forced to lock themselves in the engine while Javi joins the Folgers and Melanie admits to Ruth that she abandoned the real Mr. Wilford to die at boarding, believing that due to his selfish nature, the human race would not survive with him in charge. Layton's revolution begins with Till and Henry Klimpt joining while Roche and the Brakemen, shaken by the truth, are convinced to stand down without a fight although Commander Grey and the Jackboots continue to oppose them. In the revolution, particularly a massive battle in the Nightcar, both sides suffer heavy losses, including Big John and Patterson, before being left at a stalemate. The Last Australian and Klimpt begin setting free the people from the Drawers, only to find Pike gone, having been freed by the Folgers. Pike states that due to Layton's kind nature, with enough continuing pressure, his revolution will ultimately crumble.
9	9	"The Train Demanded Blood"	James Hawes	Aubrey Nealon	July 12, 2020	1.27
First begins executing captured revolutionaries while offering Layton an ultimatum through Pike: surrender or they will kill everyone; after learning that Zarah is pregnant with his child, Layton agrees to take the deal. With the help of Jinju and Javi, who defects due to First's ruthless tactics, Melanie escapes execution and offers Layton a plan to defeat the Folgers and their army of Jackboots by disconnecting 7 cars of the train's third class section at a switch track. With the plan requiring safety switches to be released on either side, Layton infiltrates the front of the train with the help of Roche and then escapes Grey's custody in the subtrain with the help of the Last Australian, Strong Boy, and Z-Wreck, the latter two having been rescued from the Drawers. Once making it to the end of the section to be disconnected, Layton prepares to decouple them. However, Layton notices that disconnecting the train will also sacrifice 35 revolutionaries who have been captured, including Santiago. Layton hesitates but enters the car. He knocks out a guard and tries to free the prisoners, but with the key missing and no time to rescue them, Layton apologizes to them and disables the safety, allowing Bennett and Miles to disconnect the seven third-class cars, sending the train's photographer, the Folgers, aside from LJ, Commander Grey, along with 101 other Jackboots and the prisoners to their deaths, a total of 147 people. Melanie reveals that she knew that Layton would have to sacrifice the prisoners, stating that such hard choices are what they have to live with for every second of their existence.
10	10	"994 Cars Long"	James Hawes	Graeme Manson	July 12, 2020	1.18
In the aftermath of the revolution, Melanie officially hands over control of Snowpiercer to Layton who plans to set up a democratic government. The Tailes go wild enjoying their new freedom while Pike takes over the Folgers' compartment for a never-ending party and evicts the orphaned LJ who bonds with Oz. As Snowpiercer approaches Chicago, the Engine picks up a mysterious signal suggesting possible survivors; the signal turns out to come from Big Alice, a 40-car long supply train running on a prototype of the Eternal Engine. Melanie fears the train is being run by Mr. Wilford; something that Bennett says they cannot be sure of. Big Alice clamps onto Snowpiercer and begins taking control of it while Bennett is revealed to have purposefully slowed the train in order to gain access to everything aboard Big Alice. Melanie heads outside to cut the uplink, but is thrown from the train when Big Alice brings it to a stop in the middle of Chicago. A young woman emerges from Big Alice to demand Snowpiercer's surrender on Mr. Wilford's behalf; to everyone's shock, she identifies herself as Alexandra Cavill, Melanie's believed-dead daughter.

=== Season 2 (2021) ===
No. overall	No. in season	Title	Directed by	Teleplay by	Original release date	U.S. viewers (millions)
11	1	"The Time of Two Engines"	Christoph Schrewe	Graeme Manson	January 25, 2021	1.09
Melanie manages to cut Wilford's uplink to Snowpiercer's systems and discovers that it is snowing outside despite the temperature being too cold for it. Snowpiercer, now too low on power to restart movement and with rapidly falling temperatures is forced to turn over a list of supplies to Wilford before the trains start moving again, and Layton works to maintain order onboard by reluctantly declaring martial law while Melanie is captured and reunited with Wilford and Alexandra; Wilford demands that Melanie surrender Snowpiercer but she refuses to cooperate. Layton leads an invasion of Big Alice that is repelled, but they manage to capture a hostage, Kevin, who claims that Wilford can restart everything even if everybody else dies in the process. Wilford decides to disconnect from Snowpiercer and let the passengers die with Alex complying after a moment of hesitation. However, Melanie had planted a bomb on the connecting mechanism, destroying it and permanently linking Snowpiercer and Big Alice much to the admiration of Alex; Wilford is forced to start the trains moving again.
12	2	"Smolder to Life"	Christoph Schrewe	Aubrey Nealon	February 1, 2021	0.97
Layton and Roche learn from Kevin that there are only around a hundred people on Big Alice and that there is a food shortage; Wilford later trades Melanie for Kevin, but he seemingly compels Kevin to commit suicide for revealing secrets. Lights is attacked and two of her fingers amputated, prompting Layton to promote Till to Train Detective to investigate; Till eventually realizes that Lights' fingers have been amputated to match Wilford's three-fingered salute. Melanie reveals that she believes that CW-7, the compound that froze Earth, is breaking up in the atmosphere, resulting in the planet starting to warm up again; Snowpiercer launches a weather balloon into the upper atmosphere that confirms this theory. Layton and Melanie hold a scientific summit with Wilford where he has Alex make an aborted assassination attempt on Layton. Melanie proposes a plan to exploit the planetary warming to find a place warm enough to recolonize, but the mission requires her spending a month at a research station alone. In the Second Class clinic, Zarah discovers that Josie is still alive, albeit in a severely-frostbitten state. After contemplating killing Josie, Zarah informs Layton, who rushes to Josie's side as she regains consciousness. At the end of the episode, a title card urges those who are suffering from feelings of depression or suicide or know someone who is to seek help by contacting the National Suicide Prevention Lifeline or the Crisis Text Line.
13	3	"A Great Odyssey"	David Frazee	Zak Schwartz	February 8, 2021	0.87
Layton suggests a trade of food for much-needed supplies to repair Snowpiercer and forges an alliance with Bennett to keep the train safe in Melanie's absence. Till and Roche continue to investigate the attack on Lights and come to the conclusion that the Breachmen, loyal to Wilford, are responsible; Miss Audrey shows signs of cracking and a possible descent into alcoholism. Josie, while bitter about her condition and the loss of Tailies in Melanie's plan to win the revolution, recognizes that Layton's child and Melanie's plan represent hope and the future and agrees to support Layton. Pike finds himself at odds with his illicit trade between the trains shut down; Layton agrees to allow him to reopen it under his supervision. In order to reach the research station, Snowpiercer and Big Alice are forced to cross a dangerous section of track. While preparing for Melanie's departure, she and Alex bond, leading to a tearful goodbye; Melanie reassures her daughter that she is better than Wilford's manipulations and that Alex has people on Snowpiercer who she can trust and rely on should she choose to.
14	4	"A Single Trade"	David Frazee	Kiersten Van Horne	February 15, 2021	0.92
Wilford offers to treat Snowpiercer's frostbite patients so Layton invites Wilford and his crew for a night out on Snowpiercer; Josie's frostbite proves to be severe enough that she requires a more dedicated treatment on Big Alice, however. Till is shown to struggle with the losses the train has suffered and attacks Bojan Boscovic despite his insistence that he's innocent in the attack on Lights. Miss Audrey, a former paramour of Wilford's, is revealed to have a sadomasochistic relationship with him where she is the dominant party. Layton continues to resist trusting Ruth so Zarah joins Hospitality to contribute and to try to bring the two together. During the party, Alex and LJ bond as does the Last Australian and Alex's friend Emilia who is revealed to also be Australian. Snowpiercer launches the first of their weather balloons and after a tense moment, Melanie makes contact, proving that she had survived her journey to the research station. At the end of the episode, a title card urges those who are suffering from feelings of depression or suicide or know someone who is to seek help by contacting the National Suicide Prevention Lifeline or the Crisis Text Line.
15	5	"Keep Hope Alive"	Leslie Hope	Tiffany Ezuma	February 22, 2021	0.88
As the trains prepare to turn around, Melanie fails to make contact with the latest weather balloon, sparking fears that she has perished; the crew decide to keep this a secret in order to keep hope alive. Wilford invites Miss Audrey to spend time with him on Big Alice and, without success, she attempts to make it so that Snowpiercer can spy on Wilford's communications. Still recovering under the Headwoods' care, Josie manages to send messages to Layton through Pike's illicit trade network; although Icy Bob finds out, he keeps quiet and warns Josie not to trust the Headwoods and to be careful. Till continues to struggle and lets off some steam through sparring with Pastor Logan who suggests that Layton's reign is falling apart and that they need a new leader; after Terence threatens Josie's safety, Layton has a reluctant Pike assassinate him. From Josie, Layton learns that Wilford is planning something with the Breachmen just before all but Bojan are assassinated by disguised figures. Wilford offers both Audrey and Ruth to join him on Big Alice as the border is sealed which Audrey accepts but Ruth does not.
16	6	"Many Miles from Snowpiercer"	Leslie Hope	Donald Joh	March 1, 2021	0.91
In flashbacks, Melanie and Wilford argue about which people to save as the Freeze gets worse; after Wilford has the Jackboots kill innocent people trying to board the train, Melanie reluctantly decides to steal Snowpiercer and leave Wilford behind. In the present, Melanie reaches the research station, but most of her supplies are wiped out in an avalanche. Alone, Melanie experiences hallucinations of Wilford, Layton and Alex while discovering the bodies of three scientists who had resorted to cannibalism in order to survive and some rats who managed to survive seven years due to a geothermal vent opening up. After a falling antenna nearly causes Melanie to lose her data, she fails to make contact with the train which becomes overdue. When Melanie returns to the tracks, Snowpiercer and Big Alice rush by with fire coming out of the underside of Big Alice and Alex yelling for her as alarms blare in the background, suggesting that something has gone terribly wrong; unable to reboard the train, Melanie is left alone at the side of the tracks.
17	7	"Our Answer for Everything"	Rebecca Rodriguez	Tina de la Torre	March 8, 2021	0.83
Alex finds herself excluded by Wilford due to her divided loyalties; Miss Audrey is enlisted by Wilford to treat a still-alive but traumatized Kevin, turning him into a fully-brainwashed follower of Wilford. The attack on the Breachmen leads to riots and attacks on the Tailies; while hiding with Winnie, Ruth is confronted with how her own actions under the old regime led to Suzanne's death. In an effort to defuse the situation, Layton offers to allow his arm to be frozen off, but Ruth stands up for him, urging the people not to make the same mistakes she did; the approach of the Brakemen forces the rioters to retreat without further injury, but promising to exact more retribution later. With the help of Oz, Till manages to track down one of the Breachmen's killers, First Class passenger Eugenia and realizes from her comments that Pastor Logan is the mastermind behind the attacks; he commits suicide after being confronted. As the trains pass through a multi-layered bridge, passengers light lanterns all throughout Snowpiercer, calling for Wilford; Wilford orders Sykes to have Icy Bob prepared. At the end of the episode, a title card urges those who are suffering from feelings of depression or suicide or know someone who is to seek help by contacting the National Suicide Prevention Lifeline or the Crisis Text Line.
18	8	"The Eternal Engineer"	Rebecca Rodriguez	Renée St. Cyr	March 15, 2021	0.89
LJ and Oz continue to work in janitorial and begin forming a romantic relationship; Josie continues to recover and begins displaying a resistance to cold temperatures similar to Icy Bob who Wilford has sabotage Snowpiercer's snow intake, but Icy Bob dies as a result. Bojan fixes the problem and defects to Layton's side after realizing that Wilford really had betrayed him and the Breachmen; however, the sabotage damages Snowpiercer's main computer forcing Layton to allow Wilford into the Engine to fix it, something that Layton tries to hide from the rest of the train. Although Wilford repairs it, due to Melanie's modifications to the Engine, complications arise forcing Wilford to manually restart the Engine, revealing his presence to the train. In the aftermath, Layton signals the Tail that things have gone badly with a flare before surrendering and is taken aboard Big Alice while Roche, who was struggling with his loyalty, is placed into the Drawers on Big Alice with his family. A pleased Wilford resumes his place in Snowpiercer's Engine, having successfully retaken control of the train.
19	9	"The Show Must Go On"	Clare Kilner	Zak Schwartz & Kiersten Van Horne	March 29, 2021 (Note: The first episode of the two-hour season finale was released early on March 27, 2021, via VOD, ahead the two-hour finale airing on March 29.)	0.87
In the aftermath of Wilford taking control of Snowpiercer, Layton is forced to work in Compost on Big Alice while Javi works in Big Alice's Engine under guard with Bennett doing the same on Snowpiercer. Wilford opens a carnival in the train's 272nd car and begins rooting out those who will be valuable to him; in an effort to get Till to become his moral advisor, Wilford personally executes the Breachmen's killers and has the Headwoods test Josie's new abilities. Completely disillusioned with Wilford, Alex reveals that he killed half of Big Alice's crew to save resources and plans to perform a similar culling on Snowpiercer. Having learned that Melanie has lost contact, Wilford refuses to go back for her and Ruth turns on him completely and is sent to Compost to work with Layton. Javi picks up a transmission from Melanie that he hides from Wilford, he manages to send a message to Layton and Ruth who begin plotting their escape together.
20	10	"Into the White"	Clare Kilner	Graeme Manson & Aubrey Nealon	March 29, 2021	0.82
Layton and Ruth manage to escape and take over the Engine with Alex's help while Bennett subdues Sykes but the plan goes awry after LJ warns Wilford; Javi is mauled by Wilford's dog Jupiter and Wilford is able to prevent them from picking up Melanie. Escaping to Snowpiercer, Alex proposes creating a ten-car pirate train by disconnecting the Aquarium car, allowing them to go back for Melanie and plan how to stop Wilford, however, Zarah chooses to remain behind so Layton keeps Audrey as a hostage. An attempt by Bojan to disconnect the cars is foiled by the Jackboots, but Josie is able to destroy the car from the outside, successfully separating the train. With Layton, Bennett, Till, Josie, Alex and the captive Miss Audrey and Sykes onboard the pirate train, Ruth is inadvertently left behind after being delayed by Kevin. Layton and Alex reach the research station only to find Melanie gone and her data preserved by the last of her power; that reveals that several areas of Earth are warming while a final message from Melanie reveals that she walked into the Freeze to die after expending all of her resources.

=== Season 3 (2022) ===
No. overall	No. in season	Title	Directed by	Teleplay by	Original release date	U.S. viewers (millions)
21	1	"The Tortoise and the Hare"	Christoph Schrewe	Graeme Manson & Aubrey Nealon	January 24, 2022	0.96
In the six months under Wilford, everyone on Big Alice is forced to work in harsh, freezing conditions due to the limited power. With the help of Pike, Ruth leads the resistance in hiding. Javi is revealed to still be alive and working as Big Alice's engineer. On Snowpiercer, Layton's group has not found a habitable location despite Melanie's data. While searching in North Korea, Bennett falls through a roof in a nuclear power plant, forcing Layton and Josie to rescue him. Due to problems with the Engine, Till and Alex are forced to depart and return later, but Miss Audrey and accidental stowaway Martin Colvin attempt to force Alex to meet back up with Big Alice. Sykes, who has become cooperative while a prisoner, shows wavering loyalty to Wilford; refusing to help Audrey and Martin in their actions. Till subdues them and convinces Alex not to give up hope. While waiting for Josie to return, Layton discovers a survivor in the building and after passing out from a lack of power, has a vision of a living tree in Africa. After recharging his suit in the bunker, Layton returns to the train with the survivor that he found.
22	2	"The Last to Go"	Christoph Schrewe	Marisha Mukerjee	January 31, 2022	0.66
On Snowpiercer, Layton's crew decides to reconnect with Big Alice before heading to the final location shown by Melanie's data: the Horn of Africa. Layton discovers that the tree in his vision is the dragon blood tree, something that only grows in the Horn of Africa which he takes as a sign that it's the right location. The rescued survivor, Asha, explains that she is the last of a group of scientists and their families that had taken shelter in the nuclear power plant using its residual power to survive. On Big Alice, during LJ and Oz's marriage ceremony, Ruth discovers Kevin, Javi and Wilford setting up an EMP weapon to disable Snowpiercer when the train returns. Ruth rallies Pike, Lights and Strong Boy to disarm the weapon, sacrificing herself to buy them more time. The accidentally activated device is thrown off the train and reveals Big Alice's location to Snowpiercer. As Wilford prepares to freeze off a defiant Ruth's arm as punishment, Snowpiercer returns on a parallel track and Wilford and the resistance both prepare for battle.
23	3	"The First Blow"	Erica Watson	Tina de la Torre	February 7, 2022	0.61
Snowpiercer lures Big Alice into a rail yard, losing four cars to an attack by Wilford while Strong Boy and several other revolutionaries are captured and tortured by Kevin. With the help of a signal from Pike and Ruth, Snowpiercer manages to cut off Big Alice's escape route and Layton sneaks aboard the Engine with Josie and Javi's help, forcing Wilford to surrender the train to him. Wilford is imprisoned while Snowpiercer and Big Alice reconnect, although Wilford expects that Layton's leadership will eventually fail again. After Strong Boy is tortured to death, LJ kills Kevin in order to be on the right side of the revolution and Layton has Miss Audrey exiled to Third by Sykes. In the aftermath, Till and Doctor Pelton rescue Roche and his family, only to discover that Roche's wife had died in the Drawers. Layton decides to put going to the Horn of Africa to a vote, but Layton has Asha lie that he had found her at New Eden in order to get the passengers to agree. With the vote in favor, Snowpiercer sets course for the Horn of Africa which is stated to be along the worst part of the rail network.
24	4	"Bound by One Track"	Leslie Hope	Renée St. Cyr	February 14, 2022	0.62
Snowpiercer comes across three disconnected cars from Big Alice which had been culled by Wilford, killing over 100 people, including Alex's friend Shilo. Alex and Bennett board the cars to detach the clamps. During this time, Alex and Wilford are haunted by hallucinations of Melanie; Javi, driving the train, is haunted by hallucinations of Wilford's dog. When a problem crops up, Layton is forced to turn to Wilford for help, but Roche tries to kill Wilford in revenge for his wife's death. Confronting her mixed feelings over Wilford, Alex uses the things that he taught her to solve the problem herself; she later visits a recovering Wilford. At the same time, Asha struggles with survivor's guilt while Ruth and Pike begin forming a romance. Layton learns from Doctor Pelton and Mrs. Headwood that Wilford had the Headwoods perform gene therapy on his unborn child so as to give her a cold immunity similar to that of Josie; Layton is furious when Zarah admits that she had consented to the procedure, but he returns to their shared carriage at the end of the day.
25	5	"A New Life"	Erica Watson	Adam Starks	February 21, 2022	0.66
As Zarah goes into labor, a series of terrorist attacks occur targeting Layton; it's revealed that Pike is behind them and trying to assassinate Layton due to his preference of Ruth as a leader and his blaming Layton for the people that they've lost. Despite some complications, Zarah successfully gives birth to Liana Layton. At the same time, Bennett has Javi and Sykes work together on engineering life support systems for the new colony and they bond over their mutual trauma from working for Wilford. Josie experiences an increased dulling of pain across her body as a side effect of her cold treatment and she and Bennett bond over losing the person that they love while Bennett gives Josie training as a Snowpiercer Engineer; the two later have sex. Audrey continues to struggle with her new position in life while Wilford experiences nightmares of his past sins while under the effect of the suspension drug. During this time, Alex reads to Wilford and takes him to watch cartoons to help stimulate Wilford's mind.
26	6	"Born to Bleed"	Leslie Hope	Tiffany Ezuma	February 28, 2022	0.58
With the help of LJ, Miss Audrey sneaks in to see Wilford who is left a broken man from his experiences under the suspension drug; now believing in the possibility of New Eden, Wilford studies the dragon blood tree and the Horn of Africa. Alex bonds with Carly Roche and helps Carly get in to see her father; Carly is able to convince Roche to come home. Till's investigation into the bombing identifies Pike as the culprit, sending him into hiding; Pike encounters Asha and he deduces the truth about Layton's New Eden lie. At the suggestion of Josie and Miles, Layton calls upon Pike to settle their differences via an old Tailie ritual; after Layton is unable to talk Pike down and after he threatens to expose the lie, the two men engage in a fight to the death, ending with Layton killing Pike. Afterwards, while standing vigil over Pike's body, Layton collapses due to the fight aggravating the concussion that he'd received in the bombing despite Doctor Pelton's warnings that he needs to be careful.
27	7	"Ouroboros"	Christoph Schrewe	Renée St. Cyr & Tina de la Torre	March 7, 2022	0.55
Comatose from his head injury, Layton dreams that he is part of a resistance led by Wilford on a dystopian Snowpiercer. Layton's various friends and enemies push him to confront what is keeping him trapped. In the real world, Till enlists Miss Audrey's help who reaches out to Layton, urging him to fight his way back. Reaching the Tail, Layton discovers that the boss is his now adult daughter Liana. He then is transported back to the bunker in North Korea where he discovers that his vision of the dragon blood tree came from a picture on a calendar that he saw when near death. Layton awakens with his faith in his leadership shaken by this revelation. Zarah and Josie make peace and Zarah encourages Josie to pursue a romantic relationship with Layton, acknowledging that she and Layton are better off as co-parents. An invigorated Wilford enlists Alex's help in charting out the course of Snowpiercer across the world while it was on the run before revealing that he had picked up a signal in France while Snowpiercer was a continent away. Wilford believes that the signal was from Melanie and that she is in fact still alive.
28	8	"Setting Itself Right"	Leslie Hope	Marisha Mukerjee	March 14, 2022	0.55
Bennett and Alex discover the trail of a small autonomous track maintenance vehicle leading back to a hanger on the track where they had left Melanie, supporting Wilford's theory. However, the vehicle is not designed to support life, meaning that Melanie may still have perished. Snowpiercer is diverted from its course to intercept the vehicle, but it has to pass through a cloud of toxic volcanic gas. While everyone shelters in place, Roche spends time with his daughter, Till and Miss Audrey grow closer and Zarah visits Wilford, suspecting that his motivations are to use Melanie to sow chaos amongst the passengers. A broken scrubber lets the toxic air into the train, threatening all of Snowpiecer. Asha sacrifices herself to close the air intake, saving the train and with her last words, she urges Layton not to give up, renewing his sense of purpose. Worried about the implications of Melanie's return, LJ visits Mrs. Headwood who takes blood and skin from her and is shown to be secretly working on someone. After passing through the gas, Bennett and Alex pick up the signal from Melanie's vehicle nearby.
29	9	"A Beacon for Us All"	Christoph Schrewe	Aubrey Nealon & Michael Kraus	March 21, 2022	0.66
Over the course of six months, Melanie keeps herself alive in a track scaler by using the suspension drug for the Drawers. Snowpiercer manages to catch up to Melanie's vehicle and rescues her, discovering Melanie to be still alive. However, Melanie becomes concerned about Layton's plan to take the train to the Horn of Africa after checking on the data and talking with Wilford who reminds Melanie that the track is unsafe in that area. As the passengers throw a party to celebrate passing the Pyramids of Giza for the last time and Till and Miss Audrey begin a romantic relationship, Melanie betrays Layton, making a public announcement revealing his lie to everyone and seizing the Engine with the help of an enraged Javi. Layton, Bennett, Zarah, Liana, Till and Josie retreat to Big Alice's Engine where Layton vows to fight Melanie for control of the train once again with whoever is still left on their side. In the midst of all of the chaos, Wilford poisons his guards with the help of his supporters, including LJ, and escapes.
30	10	"The Original Sinners"	Christoph Schrewe	Graeme Manson & Aubrey Nealon	March 28, 2022	0.63
Melanie and Layton prepare for war over control of the train. Wilford's forces, including Bojan who is revealed to be still alive and Wilford's new cold man, take control of the Night Car and revel in the chaos. Melanie eventually makes a deal with Wilford, but finds herself conflicted over her actions, as does Layton. Rather than allowing things to escalate any further, Melanie and Layton reach a deal where they exile Wilford together on the track scaler and then give the people a choice between continued life with Melanie on Snowpiercer, or the chance of New Eden with Layton. The trains' separation forces loved ones to say goodbye as they make their choice about where to go; after Oz leaves her, LJ accidentally chokes to death on her father's glass eye while Till decides to remain with Audrey on Snowpiercer at the last minute and Bennett stays after Melanie commits herself fully to their relationship. The rough track to the Horn of Africa derails Big Alice, but everyone survives and they find outside to be warm and habitable. Three months later, aboard Snowpiercer, Melanie spots a rocket exploding in the distance, sending parts hurtling toward the ground.

=== Season 4 (2024) ===
No. overall	No. in season	Title	Directed by	Teleplay by	Original release date	U.S. viewers (millions)
31	1	"Snakes in the Garden"	Christoph Schrewe	Paul Zbyszewski	July 21, 2024	0.40
While investigating the rocket, Ben and Till are ambushed by Animal Squad from the International Peacekeeping Forces led by Admiral Anton Milius, who also take over Snowpiercer. Nine months later, Layton and Josie are in a relationship and are part of the New Eden Town Council along with Ruth, Roche, Javi, and Alex who is often absent and is worried about an increasing series of earthquakes in the area. Aided by Boki, Alex has been investigating and is also suffering from mysterious nosebleeds. Oz has become a drunk and a recluse who believes that he is haunted by LJ and that everyone on Snowpiercer is dead. While Layton has been leading an effort to repair the bridge, not everyone is happy about the idea of Snowpiercer returning. After receiving a brief message from Snowpiercer, New Eden experiences various strange events that Layton is convinced are sabotage. A badly injured Miss Audrey arrives on a track scaler with a warning that someone is coming. Aided by Mrs. Headwood, one of Milius' men kidnaps Liana and knocks Roche unconscious. When Zarah tries to stop them, the man throws her from a cliff. Before dying, Zarah warns Josie and Boki about what happened. Layton swears to find Liana and get revenge.
32	2	"The Sting of Survival"	Christoph Schrewe	Renée St. Cyr	July 28, 2024	0.26
In a flashback, Milius' forces storm the Engine, shooting Till when she tries to warn Melanie and Miles. Audrey hits a panic button, causing Melanie to send Miles to safety and barricade herself in the Engine before Milius forces her to surrender by threatening Bennett's life. Bennett and Melanie kill one of the hijackers and escape, causing Milius to lock 100 passengers in a freezing car to force Melanie's surrender. Melanie sneaks into the Engine and saves the passengers as Snowpiercer docks at an underground bunker inside of a mountain in Djibouti. Dr. Nima Rosseau, a former colleague of Melanie's, reveals that his research team, made up of the world's best scientists who were evacuated to the bunker when the Freeze began, has found a way to cause CW-7 to break up in the atmosphere, creating the warm spots like New Eden's, but they need Snowpiercer to spread it globally and stop the Freeze. Believing in Nima's work, Melanie agrees to help him and makes a deal with Milius. However, nine months later, Audrey is launched by Bennett and Till in the track scaler to warn New Eden after Miles overhears Milius planning to ambush the colony, leaving Audrey injured in the fight at the launch. In the present, Audrey tells the New Eden residents the story of what happened on Snowpiercer.
33	3	"Life Source"	Leslie Hope	Tiffany Ezuma	August 4, 2024	0.27
On Snowpiercer, which is now a virtual labor camp, Bennett and Till are assigned by Milius to wire up a supposed fertilizer in the last car, but realize that it is a chemical weapon. During a failed attempt to use it against Milius, Till learns from Nima that Audrey made it to New Eden. Bennett and Till realize that the trap is for Big Alice because they forced Milius to push up his timeline by sending Audrey. A frantic Layton attempts to take Big Alice after Snowpiercer but is opposed by Ruth out of concern for the impact that losing the Engine will have on the colony while Layton's behavior puts a strain on his relationship with Josie. Javi is able to rig up power for three weeks without the Engine and the sympathetic Roche convinces Ruth and Layton to put the matter to a vote before the people of New Eden rather than acting unilaterally. Layton is allowed to take the Engine and four cars, but he must return within three weeks. The Tailies, Alex and surprisingly Ruth volunteer for his mission. Before leaving, Alex reveals to Javi that her data suggests that New Eden's warm spot might only be temporary.
34	4	"North Star"	Leslie Hope	Iden Baghdadchi	August 11, 2024	0.34
A week after Big Alice's departure, New Eden faces harsh weather that threatens the colony's power supply and safety while Oz finds a severed hand while out patrolling. Checking out the location again with Roche, Oz is separated from the other man in a blizzard after Oz hears a woman's voice on the radio and Roche spots something nearby. Javi enlists Sykes' help to autopsy the hand, finding a Snowpiercer access chip embedded in it, revealing that the hand belongs to one of their own people. Big Alice catches up to Snowpiercer, and Layton and Josie perform a leap between the trains to board it. Aided by their allies amongst the passengers, Josie rescues Till and Miles but is captured herself. Unwilling to let Milius spring his trap, Nima kills one of the Animal Squad and reveals their true mission to Layton, who escapes. Animal Squad is revealed to be people who were experimented upon by Nima's team. Milius forces Big Alice to follow Snowpiercer and offers to trade Liana – whom Milius claims he does not have with him but can lead them to – for Big Alice.
35	5	"The Engineer"	Joe Menendez	Tina de la Torre	August 18, 2024	0.32
After Milius allows him to talk to Liana, Layton takes the deal and surrenders Big Alice. At the Silo, Wilford, having been rescued from the track scaler by Milius' forces, is revealed to be the mastermind behind Liana's kidnapping and has Mrs. Headwood collect Josie's blood for him. Despite the dangers, Alex decides to hear Wilford out on the mission, remaining behind in the Silo with him. Ruth, Bennett, and Till stage a breakout, stealing Big Alice and taking a number of Snowpiercer passengers with them, including Doctor Pelton, Tristan, and Miles. Leaving Miles to drive the train to New Eden, Bennett sacrifices himself to separate Snowpiercer and Big Alice via a manual override, freezing to death in the process. Despite the setback, Milius takes Layton to see Liana who is in Wilford's care. Nima approaches Alex about the nosebleeds that she keeps having, suggesting that he is aware of New Eden's possible instability.
36	6	"Bell the Cat"	Joe Menendez	Renée St. Cyr & Mateja Božičević	August 25, 2024	N/A
Eleven months ago, Wilford is found by Milius' forces. Secretly undergoing treatment by Headwood and working to assert his authority, Wilford and Layton are sent to level 3 where Milius attempts to have them kill each other. Following an encounter with scarred survivors, the two men reluctantly form an alliance to escape. Nima reveals to Alex that her nosebleeds are a toxic side effect of Gemini, the compound that breaks up CW-7. Following a chemical spill, Nima's team have been running experiments on the level 3 residents to refine Gemini. Milius announces that Melanie has returned and it's time to begin the mission. On Big Alice, the passengers deal with low resources and morale following their ordeal. Ruth and Till rally the passengers to carve an inscription over the helm as a way of honoring Bennett's sacrifice. Searching for the still-missing Roche, Oz finds former Jackboot Stu Whiggins who is revealed to be the source of the severed hand. Stu eventually admits that Milius' forces had brought him in to identify Zarah and Headwood for them, but he lost his hand while escaping after learning of Zarah's death. Following a lead from Stu, Oz finds explosives planted on the mountainside which are poised to bury the town in an avalanche.
37	7	"A Moth to a Flame"	Leslie Hope	Michael Bhim	September 1, 2024	0.31
Three years ago, Captain Milius poisons the residents of Level 3, including the previous admiral and his own wife, and seizes power. Melanie returns to the Silo with serious concerns about Gemini's safety based on her data. Working together, Layton and Wilford manage to escape from Level 3 and link up with Melanie, revealing the recent events to her. As Layton rescues Josie and Liana from Headwood, Melanie reunites with Alex who reveals Bennett's death to her and her study of New Eden's anomalous weather. The alarmed Melanie realizes that Gemini is causing atmospheric erosion which will lead to the end of all life on Earth if the launch is not stopped. However, Nima refuses to listen to reason, gasses Melanie, and hijacks Snowpiercer. Wilford confronts Milius and, having taken Headwood's cold treatment, overpowers him and causes Milius to freeze to death. Cornered and with Layton intending to kill him for his crimes, Wilford chooses to commit suicide using a poisoned blunt, revealing that Nima is the creator of CW-7 who caused the Freeze. Nima has the cars carrying Layton's family cut loose, leaving them to freeze to death. Big Alice arrives at New Eden, which is nearly out of power, but the train is stopped by a booby trap on the tracks. Javi attempts to disarm it, but the bomb explodes.
38	8	"By Weeping Cross"	Leslie Hope	Tina de la Torre & John F. Corcoran	September 8, 2024	0.24
Javi survives the explosion with only a concussion and Big Alice finally reaches New Eden with the rescued Snowpiercer passengers. Although Layton nearly freezes to death aboard the detached section of Snowpiercer cars, he, Josie and Liana are rescued by Roche who picks up Layton's distress call, and explains that he had been captured by Milius' forces, but Roche had managed to escape in the chaos. Nima prepares for an invasion of New Eden to retrieve Big Alice, explaining that if they miss their launch window, they will have to wait five more years to try again. In an attempt to save her friends, Alex reluctantly agrees to help his people sneak in. New Eden prepares for a siege, moving the Engine into town so that they cannot just detonate the bombs on the mountainside. As Javi works on a way to stop the bombs, Till reconnects with a depressed Audrey. After Alex is caught sneaking in, a sniper (Spade) opens fire, starting the battle for New Eden. In the chaos, Alex is ordered at gunpoint to switch the track for Big Alice, but she hesitates.
39	9	"Dominant Traits"	Christoph Schrewe	Ian Sobel	September 15, 2024	N/A
Alex destroys the track switch computer and escapes with Layton's help. Using an IPF radio, Oz distracts the sniper while Till ambushes him. In the process, Oz discovers that Buffalo, the Irish Animal Squad engineer, is the source of the voice that he had been hearing in the hills, although she hadn't been intentionally talking to him. Till manages to kill the sniper and Rat, the soldier who had murdered Zarah. Nima admits to leading the research team that had created CW-7, but he refuses to accept his mistakes with it and intends to launch Gemini at all costs. Melanie decides to play along, talking Nima into hitting New Eden with knockout gas rather than a frontal attack, and conspiring with Alex and Layton to retake the train from him. Melanie reveals that Nima is actually Alex's biological father, having served as a sperm donor for Melanie. Nima is able to steal Big Alice, but Layton and virtually all of the fighters storm the train after discovering that the soldiers don't have any bullets (Note: An homage to the Snowpiercer movie.) and the soldiers left behind surrender to New Eden. Nima attempts to detonate the bombs in the hills, but is foiled by a jamming device planted by Javi, giving Melanie and Alex the chance to escape.
40	10	"Last Stop"	Christoph Schrewe	Paul Zbyszewski & Liam Fearnley	September 22, 2024	N/A
Nima abandons Big Alice after removing the helm controls, leaving Melanie and Alex unable to use it to stop him. Layton's forces fight through the train and Ruth is captured and taken to Nima who offers to surrender Big Alice once Gemini has been launched if Ruth will help him to restore order. Instead, Ruth escapes with the help of Z-Wreck and Sykes and rallies the remaining passengers into a rebellion. Headwood is able to revive Rat, but Layton finally kills him with Boki's help. A vengeful Josie confronts Headwood, but can't bring herself to kill the mad scientist, regaining her compassion after recognizing the other woman's own grief and trauma. Now equipped with caterpillar tracks to travel across the ocean, (Note: A reference to The Crossing, the third story in the graphic novel series.) Snowpiercer reaches the launch point. Finally realizing his errors too late, Nima allows himself to freeze to death, but the launch of Icebreaker (Note: A reference to the train from the graphic novel series.) fails due to sabotage by Alex. Reclaiming the train, everyone travels to New Eden where they decide to settle permanently, although it is unknown how long the warm spot will last for. For the time being, Snowpiercer will have to continue its revolutions in a limited capacity until it can be retrofitted to help power the town. As everyone celebrates, a patch of flowers is shown growing far away from New Eden, suggesting that the Earth is warming on its own and life is returning to the planet. (Note: A reference to the end of Terminus, the chronological end of the graphic novel series.)

== Production ==
=== Development ===
In November 2015, Marty Adelstein's Tomorrow Studios optioned the rights to develop a television series based on the 2013 film Snowpiercer. The film had been adapted from the 1982 French graphic novel Le Transperceneige by Jacques Lob, Benjamin Legrand, and Jean-Marc Rochette. The film's director Bong Joon-ho was attached as an executive producer alongside Adelstein and Josh Friedman, with the latter also set to write. A year later in November 2016, the project was ordered to pilot along with backup scripts by TNT with Friedman to serve as showrunner. In May 2017, it was announced that Scott Derrickson would direct the pilot written by Friedman. The pilot was picked up to series in January 2018. Later that month, Friedman was removed from the project by TNT due to "creative differences" with the network. Graeme Manson was appointed to replace Friedman as showrunner the following month. That June, Derrickson refused to return for reshoots on the pilot due to creative disputes with Manson, explaining via Twitter:

"The 72-page Snowpiercer TV pilot script by [Josh Friedman] is the best I've ever read. The feature-length pilot I made from that script may be my best work. The new showrunner has a radically different vision for the show. I am forgoing my option to direct the extreme reshoots."

Less than two weeks later, James Hawes joined the series in July as a co-executive producer and a director to oversee the reshoots for the pilot. According to Manson, nearly nothing of the original pilot's footage was used outside of one special-effect scene, and this reshooting was the primary cause for the year-long delay in the show's premiere. Later that month, Netflix picked up the international distribution rights to stream the series outside of the United States and China. In May 2019, it was announced that the series would air on TBS instead of TNT for a spring 2020 release, and that a second season had already been ordered by the network. That month, it was also announced that Huanxi Media Group had signed on to broadcast the first two seasons exclusively in China. Manson will return as showrunner for the second season. In September 2019, the decision to change networks was reversed, with the series once again set to air on TNT. On January 19, 2021, ahead of the second-season premiere, TNT renewed the series for a third season.

On July 29, 2021, TNT renewed the series for a fourth season. On March 28, 2022, it was announced that Paul Zbyszewski is taking over as the showrunner and added as an executive producer for the fourth season. Following the formation of new parent company Warner Bros. Discovery in April 2022, original scripted content development was cut at TNT and TBS. In June, it was announced that the fourth season will be the show's final season. It was intended to be the final scripted original series to air on TNT. On January 13, 2023, it was reported that the final season would not air on TNT. Instead, it would be shopped alongside potential prequel and sequel spinoffs. On March 14, 2024, it was reported that AMC had acquired the series and planned to air the first three seasons throughout 2024 before premiering the fourth season on July 21, 2024.

=== Writing ===
The series is designed to be a reboot of the original 2013 film's continuity. The story takes place seven years after a climate catastrophe rendered the outside world uninhabitable, forcing the remnants of humanity to live confined inside of a massive train that constantly circles the globe. The series investigates class struggle, as the passengers of the train are segregated by wealth. The series star Daveed Diggs said that the show would "broaden exponentially" the world established by the film and the 1982 graphic novel. "That's one of the advantages of TV, you have time" Diggs said, "so the politics that are hinted at in the film are explored in much more depth and the mechanism of the train [is explored further] – just the little things that create a world, world specificity". At the 2017 Television Critics Association press tour, TNT and TBS president Kevin Reilly revealed that the Snowpiercer series would be akin to a "space ship show" due to its contained setting and that it would feature a mystery during the first season.

=== Casting ===
In May 2017, Daveed Diggs was cast as Andre Layton. The following month, Jennifer Connelly and Mickey Sumner landed the other lead roles of Melanie Cavill and Bess Till, respectively. Casting continued throughout the month of June with Annalise Basso as LJ Folger, Sasha Frolova as Pixi Aariak, Alison Wright as Ruth Wardell, Benjamin Haigh as Fergus McConnell, Roberto Urbina as Javi, and Katie McGuinness as Josie McConnell. That August, it was announced that Susan Park had joined the main cast as Jinju. In September, Lena Hall was cast as Sayori. The series order in January 2018 also revealed that Sheila Vand and Sam Otto had been cast in then-undisclosed roles as series regulars. Vand was reported to be playing Zarah, while Otto will play John "Oz" Osweiler. In August 2018, Iddo Goldberg and Jaylin Fletcher were added as series regulars in the roles of Bennett and Miles, respectively.

Casting for a number of recurring roles were also announced during the month of August, including Steven Ogg as Pike, Timothy V. Murphy as Commander Grey, Happy Anderson as Klimpt, Jonathan Lloyd Walker as Big John, and Aleks Paunovic as Bojan Boscovic. The following month in September, Shaun Toub and Kerry O'Malley were added to the recurring cast as Terence and Lilah Folger, respectively. In October 2018, Aaron Glenane was cast as The Last Australian alongside Fiona Vroom as Miss Gillies, both in recurring capacities. In March 2019, Rowan Blanchard was cast as Alexandra for a guest role with the option of becoming a series regular should the series be renewed for a second season. Blanchard's promotion to the main cast for the second season was confirmed with the series' renewal that May. In June 2019, Ogg was also promoted to series regular status for the second season. In October 2019, Chelsea Harris was announced in the recurring role of Sykes. Later that month, it was also announced that Sean Bean would be a series regular for the second season. In November, Tom Lipinski was added to the second season's recurring cast as Kevin. In December 2019, Sakina Jaffrey and Damian Young joined the second season's recurring cast as Mrs. and Mr. Headwood, respectively. On February 16, 2021, Archie Panjabi was cast as a new series regular for the third season. On March 4, 2021, Chelsea Harris was promoted to as a series regular for the third season. On March 28, 2022, Clark Gregg and Michael Aronov were cast in undisclosed capacities for the fourth season.

=== Filming ===
In January 2017, it was reported that filming for the series was scheduled to begin in mid-March of that year. By September 25, pilot director Scott Derrickson indicated that production for the series had officially commenced. Reshoots for the pilot, overseen by new director James Hawes, began on August 20, 2018, in Vancouver, British Columbia and concluded on January 24, 2019. Principal photography for the second season began on October 21, 2019, in Langley, British Columbia and was originally expected to end on March 20, 2020. In March 2020, production was shut down due to the COVID-19 pandemic. Lena Hall, who portrays Miss Audrey, confirmed in July 2020 that the last block of episodes for season 2—episodes 9 and 10—were being filmed. As of March 11, 2021, filming for the third season was in progress until at least July 23, 2021. Filming for the fourth season began on March 28, 2022, and concluded on August 6, 2022.

=== Design ===
Despite the series' roots as a graphic novel and film, production designer Barry Robison was told to give the train "its own identity". He conceived the massive locomotive on a "very, very long piece of paper", drawing the entire train in "about three days," then set out to construct around 20 of the 1,001 cars of various sizes over four soundstages, following TNT's orders to avoid making the train look "too sci-fi". Construction on each of the cars with contrasting classes took less than six weeks and was met with approval from series producer and film director Bong Joon-ho.

Production designer Stephen Geaghan took over design of the series in Season 2, bringing to life new elements of Snowpiercer, as well as Big Alice and New Eden, unseen in Season 1.

== Release ==
=== Broadcast ===
The series debuted on TNT in the United States in the spring of 2020, while Netflix began to air the series globally outside of the United States and China. Huanxi Media Group is set to broadcast the first two seasons exclusively in China.

The series had originally been planned to premiere on May 31, 2020, yet was moved up to May 17, 2020, in early April. Brett Weitz, general manager for TNT, stated the earlier premiere was related to the COVID-19 pandemic in order to bring the series to viewers earlier. On October 8, 2020, at New York Comic Con, TNT announced the second season was set to premiere on January 25, 2021. The third season premiered on January 24, 2022. The fourth and final season premiered on July 21, 2024, on AMC.

In April 2026, Radial Entertainment announced that Seasons 1 through 3 were available for ad-supported streaming on Roku, Pluto TV, Tubi, and Plex, with The CW to follow later in the month, and Season 4 to come to the same platforms during the summer of 2026.

=== Marketing ===
Cast members Connelly, Diggs, Wright, Sumner, Hall, and Ogg attended the 2019 San Diego Comic-Con along with executive producers Manson, Adelstein, and Clements to promote the series and debut its first official trailer. As part of the promotion for the upcoming series, insect protein bars mimicking those from the film were made available at the event.

== Reception ==
=== Critical response ===
The show received mixed reviews. Review aggregator Rotten Tomatoes collected 82 critic reviews, identified 63% of them as positive, and reported an average rating of 6.5/10 for the first season. The website's critics consensus reads: "Snowpiercer takes a different route with its source material, crafting an ambitious sci-fi mystery with style to spare, but with little of the subversive bite of Bong Joon-ho's theatrical adaptation." Metacritic assigned the first season a weighted average score of 55 out of 100, based on 25 critics, indicating "mixed or average reviews".

For the second season, Rotten Tomatoes reported an approval rating of 88% based on 16 reviews, with an average rating of 7.1/10. The website's critics consensus states: "Snowpiercer's second season picks up the momentum by dropping narrative baggage without losing its critical reflections on society." Metacritic gave the second season a weighted average score of 59 out of 100 based on 5 reviews, indicating "mixed or average reviews".

=== Ratings ===
==== Season 1 ====
Viewership and ratings per episode of Snowpiercer
No.	Title	Air date	Rating (18–49)	Viewers (millions)	DVR (18–49)	DVR viewers (millions)	Total (18–49)	Total viewers (millions)
1	"First, the Weather Changed"	May 17, 2020	0.5	1.94	0.3	1.41	0.8	3.35
2	"Prepare to Brace"	May 24, 2020	0.3	1.16	0.2	0.87	0.5	2.03
3	"Access Is Power"	May 31, 2020	0.3	1.22	0.4	1.42	0.7	2.65
4	"Without Their Maker"	June 7, 2020	0.3	1.19	0.3	1.33	0.6	2.52
5	"Justice Never Boarded"	June 14, 2020	0.3	1.18	0.3	1.17	0.6	2.36
6	"Trouble Comes Sideways"	June 21, 2020	0.3	0.96	0.2	1.20	0.5	2.16
7	"The Universe Is Indifferent"	June 28, 2020	0.3	1.20	0.3	1.25	0.6	2.45
8	"These Are His Revolutions"	July 5, 2020	0.3	1.14	0.3	1.23	0.6	2.37
9	"The Train Demanded Blood"	July 12, 2020	0.3	1.27	0.3	1.08	0.6	2.35
10	"994 Cars Long"	July 12, 2020	0.3	1.18	0.3	1.22	0.6	2.41

==== Season 2 ====
Viewership and ratings per episode of Snowpiercer
No.	Title	Air date	Rating (18–49)	Viewers (millions)	DVR (18–49)	DVR viewers (millions)	Total (18–49)	Total viewers (millions)
1	"The Time of Two Engines"	January 25, 2021	0.3	1.09	—N/a	—N/a	—N/a	—N/a
2	"Smolder to Life"	February 1, 2021	0.3	0.97	—N/a	—N/a	—N/a	—N/a
3	"A Great Odyssey"	February 8, 2021	0.2	0.87	0.3	1.01	0.5	1.88
4	"A Single Trade"	February 15, 2021	0.3	0.92	0.3	1.02	0.5	1.94
5	"Keep Hope Alive"	February 22, 2021	0.3	0.88	0.3	1.11	0.5	1.98
6	"Many Miles from Snowpiercer"	March 1, 2021	0.3	0.91	0.2	1.04	0.5	1.95
7	"Our Answer for Everything"	March 8, 2021	0.2	0.83	0.3	1.05	0.5	1.87
8	"The Eternal Engineer"	March 15, 2021	0.2	0.89	—N/a	—N/a	—N/a	—N/a
9	"The Show Must Go On"	March 29, 2021	0.2	0.87	—N/a	—N/a	—N/a	—N/a
10	"Into the White"	March 29, 2021	0.2	0.82	—N/a	—N/a	—N/a	—N/a

==== Season 3 ====
Viewership and ratings per episode of Snowpiercer
No.	Title	Air date	Rating (18–49)	Viewers (millions)
1	"The Tortoise and the Hare"	January 24, 2022	0.2	0.96
2	"The Last to Go"	January 31, 2022	0.1	0.66
3	"The First Blow"	February 7, 2022	0.2	0.61
4	"Bound by One Track"	February 14, 2022	0.1	0.62
5	"A New Life"	February 21, 2022	0.2	0.66
6	"Born to Bleed"	February 28, 2022	0.1	0.58
7	"Ouroboros"	March 7, 2022	0.1	0.55
8	"Setting Itself Right"	March 14, 2022	0.1	0.55
9	"A Beacon for Us All"	March 21, 2022	0.2	0.66
10	"The Original Sinners"	March 28, 2022	0.1	0.63

==== Season 4 ====
Viewership and ratings per episode of Snowpiercer
No.	Title	Air date	Rating (18–49)	Viewers (millions)
1	"Snakes in the Garden"	July 21, 2024	0.1	0.40
2	"The Sting of Survival"	July 28, 2024	0.1	0.26
3	"Life Source"	August 4, 2024	0.0	0.27
4	"North Star"	August 11, 2024	0.1	0.34
5	"The Engineer"	August 18, 2024	0.1	0.32
7	"A Moth to a Flame"	September 1, 2024	0.1	0.31
8	"By Weeping Cross"	September 8, 2024	0.0	0.24

=== Awards and nominations ===
Year	Association	Category	Nominated	Result	Ref.
2020	Seoul International Drama Awards	Most Popular Foreign Drama	Snowpiercer	Won	
2021	Costume Designers Guild Awards	Excellence in Sci-Fi/Fantasy Television	Cynthia Summers (for "Access is Power")	Nominated	
2021	Critics' Choice Super Awards	Best Actor in an Action Series	Daveed Diggs	Won	
2021	Critics' Choice Super Awards	Best Actress in an Action Series	Jennifer Connelly	Nominated	
2021	Critics' Choice Super Awards	Best Actress in an Action Series	Alison Wright	Nominated	
2021	Golden Reel Awards	Outstanding Achievement in Sound Editing – Episodic Short Form – Dialogue/ADR	Sandra Portman, Eric Mouawad, and Francisco Frial (for "Trouble Comes Sideways")	Nominated	
2021	Golden Reel Awards	Outstanding Achievement in Sound Editing – Episodic Short Form – Effects/Foley	Sandra Portman, James Fonnyadt, Gregorio Gomez, Dario DiSanto, and Maureen Murphy (for "Trouble Comes Sideways")	Nominated	
2021	Golden Reel Awards	Outstanding Achievement in Sound Editing – Episodic Short Form – Music	Michael Baber and Alex Heller (for "Trouble Comes Sideways")	Nominated	
2021	Saturn Awards	Best Action/Thriller Television Series	Snowpiercer	Nominated	
2022	Critics' Choice Super Awards	Best Science Fiction/Fantasy Series	Snowpiercer	Nominated	
2022	Critics' Choice Super Awards	Best Actor in a Science Fiction/Fantasy Series	Daveed Diggs	Won	
2022	Critics' Choice Super Awards	Best Actress in a Science Fiction/Fantasy Series	Alison Wright	Nominated	
2022	Hollywood Critics Association TV Awards	Best Cable Network Series, Drama	Snowpiercer	Nominated	
2022	Hollywood Critics Association TV Awards	Best Actor in a Broadcast Network or Cable Series, Drama	Daveed Diggs	Nominated	
2022	Primetime Creative Arts Emmy Awards	Outstanding Special Visual Effects in a Single Episode	Geoff Scott, Darren Bell, Chris Ryan, Christine Galvan, Anita Milias, Jordan Acomba, Jason Snea, Hannes Poser, and Jamie Barty (for "A Beacon for Us All")	Nominated	
