= Just Jordan =

American television series

- Just Jordan title logo featuring Lil' JJ as Jordan Lewis
- Created by: Alison Taylor
- Starring: Lil' JJ; Justin Chon; Raven Goodwin; Kristen Combs; Eddy Martin; Shania Accius; Beau Billingslea; Chelsea Harris (season 1); Chelsea Tavares; (season 2)
- Country of origin: United States
- Original language: English
- No. of seasons: 2
- No. of episodes: 29

Production
- Executive producer: Ralph Farquhar
- Running time: 22 minutes
- Production companies: Rosa Floribunda Productions (season 2); Nickelodeon Productions

Original release
- Network: Nickelodeon
- Release: January 7, 2007 – August 23, 2008

Just Jordan is an American sitcom created by Alison Taylor. It starred Lil' JJ and aired on Nickelodeon as a part of the network's TEENick lineup. The series debuted on January 7, 2007, and ended its run on August 23, 2008, with 29 episodes produced. BET aired reruns of the series until 2010. After several years, reruns made a short-lived return on MTV2, with only 6 episodes airing on October 16, 2016.

== Premise ==
The show follows the exploits and actions of Jordan Lewis, who has moved to Los Angeles from Little Rock. He has to work in his gruff grandfather's diner, and survive with a silly younger sister, a critical cousin, and his over-protective mom who seems to know all his misdeeds before he even conceives of them.

== Production ==
The first season of Just Jordan had 13 episodes, and ran from January 7, 2007, to August 10, 2007. The second season, which was filmed in front of a live studio audience, began September 16, 2007 and ended on March 2, 2008, with the two-part episode "Picture Me Rollin'". The third season saw only three episodes produced, which were later added to season two. Production of the series was halted due to the 2007–08 writer's strike, with Nickelodeon making the decision to cancel the series after season two. In all, the second season had a total of 16 episodes.

== Characters ==
- Jordan James Lewis (played by Lil' JJ) is 16-years-old and the main character of the series. Jordan usually speaks his mind before thinking about it. His parents are divorced, and he moved with his mother and sister from Arkansas to Los Angeles to live with their grandfather. His best friends are Joaquin Montez and Tony Lee. He enjoys basketball, and works at his grandfather's grill. In the first season, he went out with Tamika, but they broke up by the second season. Jordan's new love interest is Autumn Williams.
- Joaquin Osmando Montez (played by Eddy Martin) is the best friend of Jordan Lewis. He is planning a career in politics (just like the rest of his family other than his dad who is a police officer) and does not like to make mistakes because they might end up on his "permanent record". He is counting on Jordan and his other friends to make him more "social".
- Tony Lee (played by Justin Chon) is Jordan's other best friend, and sometimes rival. They began as rivals on the basketball court, but when Tony took a job at Grandpa's restaurant Jordan and Tony became best friends. Tony and Jordan are constantly competing for girls, especially Autumn, Jordan's new interest.
- Tangie Cunningham (played by Raven Goodwin) is Jordan and Monica's cousin and his toughest critic. She is concerned that Jordan's image will have in cool in the big city of L.A. Tangie is obsessed with Tony and one of her main goals is to pass Oprah Winfrey in fame and in wealth. She has a crush on Tony as seen in all of the episodes so far.
- Monica Lewis (played by Kristen Combs) is Jordan's 9-year-old sister who has him tracked down 24/7. Jordan doesn't mind his sister and always wants to know what she is doing and how he can help. When Jordan began ignoring her in the episode "Air Jordan" she asked Tony to take her to school. She has two dolls that look like her called "Ponica" and "Shonica". She loves to watch her TV, and eating chips. Her nickname is Mo-Mo.
- Pamela Cunningham-Lewis (played by Shania Accius) is Jordan and Monica's mother who according to him: "has eyes in the back of her head" She moved her family back to Los Angeles and they are back living in Grandpa's house/restaurant. She is very over-protective of Jordan.
- Grant Cunningham (played by Beau Billingslea) is Jordan's, Tangie's, and Monica's grandfather and Pamela's father. He has owned the local diner for as long as anyone can remember. He expects discipline and order from everyone (especially Jordan and Tangie). Most people think he can make the best macaroni and cheese in L.A. County. He often falls for Monica and will buy anything for her.
- Tamika Newsome (played by Chelsea Harris) (season 1) was Tangie's best friend and a girl that Jordan has a major crush on. She developed a crush on Jordan because he was acting like a thug, but then she realized that she really didn't like bad boys. She went out with Jordan for a while, then broke up with him. Tamika was a nice girl, but she wasn't as interested in Jordan as Jordan was interested in her. She doesn't return in the second season because she moved away.
- Autumn Williams (played by Chelsea Tavares) (season 2) is the new girl in town, Autumn just moved to the neighborhood with her family. She's gorgeous, sweet and down to earth. No one would ever guess that she's the super model next door. Jordan and Autumn love hanging out together and become fast friends. Over time, their friendship blossoms into a relationship between the two.

== Episodes ==
=== Season 1 (2007) ===
No. overall	No. in season	Title	Directed by	Written by	Original release date	Prod. code
1	1	"Air Jordan"	Henry Chan	Alison Taylor	January 7, 2007	101
Jordan, Tony and Joaquin try out for the basketball team.
2	2	"Fools in the Hood"	Joe Menendez	Silvia Olivas	January 14, 2007	102
Jordan, Tony and Joaquin begin acting like thugs to get girls interested in them.
3	3	"Lemme See Your Grill"	Tony Singletary	Fred Johnson	January 21, 2007	105
Jordan spends his first paycheck to buy crazy things. Meanwhile, Grandpa Grant spoils Monica by buying her things for her doll.
4	4	"Home Alone in the Diner"	David Kendall	Sabrina Campbell	February 11, 2007	110
Jordan is left in charge of the diner while his mother, grandpa and sister are in San Diego.
5	5	"No Justice, No Pants"	Chip Hurd	Vince Cheung & Ben Montanio	February 18, 2007	104
Jordan leads a protest against school uniforms. But, his mistakes cause his suspension and threatens his chance with his crush. Meanwhile, Grandpa Grant uses Monica's newfound chess playing ability to beat his friends.
6	6	"Practice What You Preach"	Joe Menendez	Silvia Olivas	February 25, 2007	111
Jordan tries to become a preacher.
7	7	"Get a Job"	Henry Chan	Calvin Brown Jr.	March 11, 2007	103
Jordan’s grandpa thinks family shouldn't be paid for working at the diner. Jordan rebels and quits and starts working at the Korean restaurant owned by Grandpa’s long-time rival, Mr. Chung
8	8	"Fists of Funny"	Fracaswell Hyman	James E. West II	March 18, 2007	106
Jordan is having the time of his life in his martial arts class until his mom and instructor meet, and hit it off. Jordan doesn't like the idea of his mom dating people he knows so he tells his instructor that his mom and his dad are getting back together. Meanwhile, Monica also becomes grossed out when Grandpa starts dating the grandmother of one of Monica’s friends.
9	9	"Flip the Script"	Chip Hurd	Silvia Olivas	March 25, 2007	107
Tony is fed up with Tangie’s advances and tells Jordan they can't hang out as much because of his aggressive cousin. Irritated, Jordan devises a plan whereby Tony “flips the script” on Tangie and starts crowding her space so she'll lose interest in him. The plan works, until Monica reveals that the boys have been playing her all along and the girls come up with a scheme of their own.
10	10	"Critter is Buggin"	Paul Hoen	Wayne Stamps	April 15, 2007	109
Jordan ditches Tony for visiting friend, Critter (Chris Warren Jr.).
11	11	"Jordan's Goose Is Cooked"	Fracaswell Hyman	Calvin Brown Jr.	June 3, 2007	113
Jordan pretends to be Tamika's boyfriend in order to get rid of an unrequited crush named Goose (Bobb'e J. Thompson).
12	12	"Krumpshakers"	Kim Fields	Calvin Brown Jr.	July 19, 2007	108
Jordan organizes a team of Krumpers to beat Chung and go to Miami.
13	13	"Piano Stressin'"	Paul Hoen	Ron Holsey	August 10, 2007	112
Jordan gets a new piano player named Lindsey (Miranda Cosgrove) to save his basketball career. This goes wrong when Lindsey's desire to be normal gets out of hand. Then his coach threatens to take him off the team when he has to return Lindsey to her old self. Meanwhile, Tangie goes into jewelry making.

=== Season 2 (2007–08) ===
No. overall	No. in season	Title	Directed by	Written by	Original release date	Prod. code
14	1	"Dancing King"	Linda Mendoza	Ernie Bustamante & Alison Taylor	September 16, 2007	201
When Jordan discovers that a club might be more crooked than cool, he takes a stand that ruins the fun for everyone. When he realizes that he was wrong and he jumped to conclusions too quickly, he has to use his leadership and smooth dancing ability to help his friends get back in. Note: This episode aired as part of Nickelodeon's dancing lineup, featuring dancing themed episodes of Nickelodeon's sitcoms, and also featured new episodes of Unfabulous, Drake & Josh, Zoey 101, and iCarly.
15	2	"Jordan's Got It Bad"	Chip Hurd & Linda Mendoza	Ernie Bustamante, Freddie Guitierrez & Shauna Robinson	September 23, 2007	202
Jordan desperately tries to continue his relationship with Tamika after she moves away, but it soon comes to an end. Luckily, the arrival of a new girl in town inspires him to move on.
16	3	"Dead Man Joaquin"	Chip Hurd	Ernie Bustamante	September 29, 2007	203
When Joaquin tries out for class president Tangie is overpowering him with the girls votes. Now Jordan has to step up and help his friend. Jordan runs but he doesn't know anything about politics so Joaquin is president Tangie loses and becomes the V.P. Meanwhile, Pam tries to help Monica with her homework and decides to go to college.
17	4	"Fame Game"	Joe Menendez	Ralph Greene	November 3, 2007	204
Jordan and his friends bump into teen pop sensation, CC Livingston (Keke Palmer), who is being chased by the paparazzi.
18	5	"Mr. 500"	Joe Menendez	Teri Schaffer	November 10, 2007	205
Jordan wins a Segway at a convention with Joaquin and Tony, but then sells the device and keeps the cash for himself. Meanwhile, Tangie tries a bit too hard to get Monica an invitation to a party.
19	6	"Slippery When Wet"	David Kendall	Dan Cross & David Hoge	November 17, 2007	206
Tangie and Autumn read a book that tells you how to control the universe. Jordan uses this to get Tony out of basketball practice by having him slip on the floor, but he realizes the universe gets revenge when his practice players are much bigger than him. Guest Star: Demi Lovato as Nicole
20	7	"Revenge of the Riff"	Robbie Countryman	Freddie Gutierrez, Wesley Jermaine Johnson & Scott Taylor	December 1, 2007	207
Jordan does Battle of the Bands against a freshman (Leon Thomas III) on a video game and loses. So Jordan and the freshman decide to play a real song on a real guitar. Tony is tutoring Jordan on playing the guitar and later on Tony realizes that the freshman is cheating. Meanwhile, Tangie and Joaquin hold a fundraiser.
21	8	"The Goose, the Puffs, and the Wardrobe"	Warren Hutcherson	Freddie Gutierrez, Wesley Jermaine Johnson & Scott Taylor	December 8, 2007	208
The Goose is mean to everybody and Tony and Jordan try to make him stop but he won't. Tangie and Joaquin take a dance class for a gym credit.
22	9	"Lord of the Pies"	Maynard C. Virgil I	Jimmy Aleck & Jim Keily	January 12, 2008	209
Jordan and his friends bake a rotten pie for a rude customer. They later find out that it is Autumn's dad. The race is on to stop her father from eating the dessert.
23	10	"Cool Guys Don't Wear Periwinkle"	Eric Dean Seaton	Teri Schaffer	February 10, 2008	210
Joaquin gets a date for a dance, which he later finds out is really a prank.
24	11	"Jump, Jordan"	Leonard R. Garner Jr.	Teri Schaffer	February 24, 2008	211
Jordan tries to help Grandpa have fun. Grandpa tries to help Jordan with his fear of heights. Meanwhile, Tangie and Monica sell Peanut Butter & Jelly sandwiches to the diner after hours.
25–26	12–13	"Picture Me Rollin'"	David Kendall	Dan Cross & David Hoge	March 2, 2008	212–213
After passing his driver's test, Jordan asks Autumn to be his date for the party. But, Jordan bumps into another car with his, and since he can't drive to the party, he needs to find another person to be willing to. Note: This two-part episode, were initially the last episodes of season two. The last three episodes following these episodes were produced for the show's third season, but they were later added into the second season.
27	14	"Boogie Toasties"	Joe Menendez	Antonia F. March & Jacqueline M. McKinley	March 15, 2008	301
Jordan is excited when Autumn lets him be in her new commercial. He's embarrassed when he learns that he must dress like a nerd for the commercial with Autumn.
28	15	"Anniversary-What?"	Warren Hutcherson	Dan Cross & David Hoge	April 5, 2008	302
When Jordan forgets to buy Autumn a present to celebrate three months together, he scrambles to find a gift for her before time runs out.
29	16	"Let Sleeping Dogs Lie"	Joe Menendez	Freddie Gutierrez, Wesley Jermaine Johnson & Scott Taylor	August 23, 2008	303
When Autumn puts Jordan in charge of her pesky dog, he fears that Autumn is going to dump him when she finds out he died under Jordan's care.
