= Chelsea Harris =

American actress

- Occupation: Actress
- Years active: 2007–present

Chelsea Harris is an American actress best known for roles on Just Jordan, Designated Survivor and Snowpiercer. She played Necie on The Neighborhood from 2022–2023.

== Career ==
Chelsea Harris had a recurring appearance as Tricia Sims on Designated Survivor. She was later cast in Star Trek: Picard, which was a new step for her. "I have to be super honest... growing up, Star Trek was on TV, but I never really got into it when I was younger. I was watching Disney Channel." Getting cast in the series opened her taste for the Sci-Fi genre and she was cast in a recurring role for season two of Snowpiercer.

== Filmography ==
=== Film ===
Year	Title	Role	Notes
2010	The Assignment	Mandy	
2010	June 23rd	Chelsea Amy Harris	
2013	Freedom Check Point	Alice Moondrop	Short
2017	Once Upon a Date	Bella Morrow	TV movie
2017	Summer of Justice	Sommer Jones	Short
2019	Flyby	Sala	Short
2020	Phone Stack	Bella	Short
2021	Take Back the Night	The Whistleblower	TV movie
2022	Ambulance	Bicycle Cop	
2022	Top Gun: Maverick	Flag Aide Angela Burke	

=== Television ===
Year	Title	Role	Notes
2007	Hannah Montana	Gina	Episode: "My Boyfriend's Jackson and There's Gonna Be Trouble"
2007	Just Jordan	Tamika Newsome	Main Cast: Season 1
2008	Miss Guided	Allison	Episode: "Homecoming"
2010	Jonas	Carrie Sue	Episode: "Beauty and the Beat"
2011	Time for Passion	Mel Bee	Main Cast
2012	Grey's Anatomy	Lori	Episode: "One Step Too Far"
2013	Pretty Little Liars	Edgy	Episode: "Out of the Frying Pan, Into the Inferno"
2013	Community	Freshman Girl	Episode: "History 101"
2013	Necessary Roughness	Leslie Stokes	Episode: "The Game's Afoot"
2013	NCIS	Danielle Benton	Episode: "Oil and Water"
2014	Modern Family	Receptionist	Episode: "The Feud"
2014	Spooked	Sarah	Episode: "Exorschism"
2014	Austin & Ally	Nikki Rush	Episode: "Relationships & Red Carpets"
2014–2015	Stalker	Belle	Recurring Cast
2016	Baby Daddy	Renee	Recurring Cast: Season 5
2018	Designated Survivor	Tricia Sims	Recurring Cast: Season 2
2019	Station 19	Nikki	Recurring Cast: Season 2
2019	NCIS: Los Angeles	Eloni	Episode: "Kill Beale: Vol. 1"
2020	Star Trek: Picard	Dr. Naáshala Kunamadéstifee	Episode: "Maps and Legends"
2021	Colin in Black & White	Keke	Episode: "Cornrows"
2021–2024	Snowpiercer	Sykes	Recurring Cast: Season 2, Main Cast: Season 3-4
2022	9-1-1	Amari Sharpe	Episode: "Starting Over"
2022–2023	The Neighborhood	Necie	Recurring Cast: Season 4–5
2025	The Waterfront	Annie	2 episodes
2025	Reasonable Doubt	Young Mama Lu	Episode: "Lost One"
