= Bombil and Beatrice =

2007 film directed by Kaizad Gustad

- Directed by: Kaizad Gustad
- Written by: Kaizad Gustad
- Produced by: Manu Kumaran; Ayesha Shroff; Taizoon Khorakiwala
- Starring: Prashant Narayanan; Katie McGuinness; Piyush Mishra
- Cinematography: Trevor Forrest
- Edited by: Steve Mercer; Robert Wallace
- Music by: A.R. Rahman
- Release date: 2007
- Running time: 97 minutes
- Country: India
- Language: English

Bombil & Beatrice is an Indian English language romantic thriller film directed by Kaizad Gustad. Presented by Medient in association with Crossover Joint Ventures & Quest Films Limited, the film stars Katie McGuinness, Prashant Narayanan and Piyush Mishra in lead roles. The film was released at the Cannes film festival in 2007.

== Premise ==
Many years ago, amid palpable tension between the Britishers and the Indians due to the ongoing struggle for freedom, an English woman named Beatrice and an Indian man named Vilas were in love with each other and promised to wait for even a 100 years if they had to so as to live together. On New Year's Eve Beatrice decides to run away with Vilas but tragedy strikes before she can even meet him and her love story comes to an abrupt end. A century has passed now, and Beatrice finds out that Vilas has been reborn as Bombil. Beatrice decides to meet him and gives him a job to do.

== Cast ==
- Prashant Narayanan as Vilas/Bombil
- Katie McGuinness as Beatrice
- Piyush Mishra

== Production ==
=== Filming ===
Bombil and Beatrice was filmed in London and Mumbai.
