= Katie McGuinness =

British actress (born 1984)

- Born: Sussex, England
- Occupation: British actress
- Years active: 2000–present

Katie McGuinness is a British actress, who has held leading roles in numerous television series, movies, stage plays and voice acting roles for video/computer games

== Early life and education ==
Katie McGuinness, born Evans, was born in East Sussex, England. McGuinness attended school at Beacon Academy in Crowborough, and Tunbridge Wells Girls' Grammar School. She said in a 2020 interview she had always acted since childhood, and that her mother, who she greatly admires, was "very musical and into drama". She studied acting at London Academy of Music and Dramatic Art (LAMDA).

== Career ==
McGuinness is best known for appearances in the television series' Snowpiercer (2020–2024), Roots (2016), The Borgias (2012), and Hollywood (2020). Her best known film appearances include The Man Who Invented Christmas (2017), and Bombil and Beatrice (2007). McGuinness has also been a voice actor for numerous video games, and had roles in stage plays including J.B. Priestley's 1945 play An Inspector Calls (2005), Oscar Wilde's 1893 play Salome (2006), John Masefield's 1908 Nan (2007), Susan Glaspell's 1922 Chains of Dew (2008), James Graham's A History of Falling Things (2009), Allan Monkhouse's 1911 Mary Broome (2011), Githa Sowerby's 1924 The Stepmother (2013), and Death of a Comedian (2015), by Belfast playwright Owen McCafferty. She believes that storytelling is an innate part of human nature, and she likes figuring out how her characters tick.

== Critical reviews ==
=== Dramatic productions ===
An Inspector Calls: Steve Orme, writing for British Theatre Guide in 2005, claims McGuinness delivered a “lively interpretation” of Sheila Birling, despite the play's out-of-era bomb threats. Kevin Catchpole found McGuinness' characterisation “strong” and “sympathetic”, but was unimpressed by the taped music and sound effects.

Salome: Rachel Zedner in ReviewsGate states in 2006: "Salome ... is both innocent and yet the ultimate manipulator. Katie McGuinness combines these attributes superbly, demonstrating how power can corrupt absolutely."

Nan: Michael Billington, as reviewer for The Guardian in 2007 states: "The great wooing scene [is] here beautifully played by Katie McGuinness as a nervously ardent Nan..."

Chains of Dew: John Thaxter in the British Theatre Guide in 2008 stated that Katie McGuinness gave a "life-enhancing performance" as a young woman transformed, "embracing freedom and self-expression".

A History of Falling Things: Elisabeth Mahoney in The Guardian in 2009 found Katie McGuinness - playing an isolated panic-stricken woman in the wake of the 7/7 London bombings - and her funny co-star Sion Pritchard, "both instantly credible".

Mary Broome: Michael Spring in Fringe Report in 2011 describes Katie McGuinness in her title role as Mary Broome, playing a woman who "is awkward, untutored but also youthfully decisive and if not ‘pure’ then certainly loving, aware of a duty to remake the world in her own generation." Natasha Tripney in Exeunt Magazine states: "Katie McGuinness has an apt placidity as Mary, a woman used to accepting the various hands that life has dealt her, but who is also quite unshakeable when she sets her mind to a thing", although she found the play's momentum petered out in the second half. Paul Taylor in The Independent, believed "theatre lovers should flock to" see it, and said: "Katie McGuinness as the eponymous housemaid beautifully conveys the girl's tearful confusion and the intelligence which, lurking behind her ostensible stupidity, helps her make a brave, climactic decision."

The Stepmother: Matt Wolf, in TheArtsDesk.com, praised Katie McGuinness' 2013 performance as Lois, "a young heroine who radiates charity, decency, and all things good" opposite "a hissable anti-hero" in a play in which "virtue and generosity are seen to prevail". McGuinness' role moves between the pre-marriage Lois, "a guileless and trusting young soul", and the post-marriage "plucky" businesswoman and "advocate and ally for [her] two [step-]daughters". Michael Billington in The Guardian describes the play as "riveting stuff" and notes "the high quality of the acting", with "Katie McGuinness [having] just the right mix of guilelessness and guts as Lois". Lucien Boyce's detailed review on her website notes that the play explores "female autonomy and power within patriarchy" in the time between the two world wars, addressing "the control of property [by men] and the exclusion of women from male institutions", with Katie McGuinness and Christopher Ravenscroft both delivering "fantastic" performances.

Death of a Comedian: Stuart Black, in the Londonist in 2015, describes this play as a "Faustian journey" which he says however is "strangely cynical", and "lacks the requisite amount of drama", with the "three main characters ... flattened to archetypes", these being stand-up comic Steve (Brian Doherty), his girlfriend Maggie (Katie McGuinness) as Angel, and his agent Doug (Shaun Dingwall) as Devil. Veronica Lee in TheArtsDesk.com notes that Katie McGuinness "ma[de] the most of an underwritten part" and says that, while the performances were "committed", the characters "too often feel like ciphers making speeches rather than people talking to each other".

== Personal life ==
McGuinness says she loves nature, practices meditation and yoga, and enjoys dancing and spending time with family members and her boyfriend.

== Filmography and theatre ==
=== Film ===
Year	Title	Role	Notes
2004	Dirty Filthy Love	Alison	A single British television drama, directed by Adrian Shergold, produced by Granada
2007	Bombil and Beatrice	Beatrice	An Indian-English romantic thriller, filmed in London and Mumbai, directed by Kaizad Gustad
2013	A Performance	Girlfriend	Short film
2014	The Hatching	A news reporter / journalist	Comedy, horror, suspense. Directed by Michael Anderson
2017	The Man Who Invented Christmas	Fanny Dickens, and Mrs Cratchit	Screenwritten by Susan Coyne, inspired by Charles Dickens' "A Christmas Carol"

=== Television ===
Year	Title	Role	Notes
2004	He Knew He Was Right	Jenny	BBC series, Episode 1: 'Part 1'
2005	Murder Investigation Team	Becky Hamilton	Series, 2003–2005
2006	Hotel Babylon	Naomi Stern	Series
2009	Doctors	Hannah Gilbert, and Hannah Stanuski	Series, 2000–2024. Episode: 'One for the Road'
2012	Lewis	Samantha Earnshaw	Episode: 'Generation of Vipers'
2012	The Borgias	Beatrice	Two episodes: 'The Choice', and 'Paolo'
2016	Stan Lee's Lucky Man	Kelly Harrington	Episode: 'A Twist of Fate'
2016	Roots	Elizabeth Waller	Two episodes, a remake of the 2007 series of the same name
2020	Hollywood	Vivien Leigh	One series; two episodes
2020-2024	Snowpiercer	Josie Wellstead	Appeared in 35 of 40 episodes, across four seasons

=== Video games ===
Year	Title	Role	Notes
2010	Xenoblade Chronicles	Tyrea	Voice (English version)
2012	Assassin's Creed III	Gillian McCarthey	Voice
2013	Soul Sacrifice		Additional voices
2015	Xenoblade Chronicles 3D	Tyrea	Voice (English version)
2015	The Witcher 3: Wild Hunt	Keira Metz	Voice (English version)
2015	Guitar Hero Live		Voice
2017	Layton's Mystery Journey: Katrielle and the Millionaires' Conspiracy		Voice
2020	Xenoblade Chronicles X: Definitive Edition	Tyrea	Voice (English version)

=== Theatre ===
Year	Title	Author	Role	Notes
2005	An Inspector Calls	J. B. Priestley	Sheila Birling	Written 1945, set in 1912; at Oxford Playhouse
2006	Salome	Oscar Wilde	Salome	First published 1893 in French; banned in England until 1931
2007	Nan (or The Tragedy of Nan)	John Masefield	Nan	Written 1908
2008	Chains of Dew	Susan Glaspell	Dotty	Written 1922
2009	A History of Falling Things	James Graham	Jacqui	Contemporary
2011	Mary Broome	Allan Monkhouse	Mary Broome	Written 1911; one source suggests it may have been written by Monkhouse's father
2013	The Stepmother	Githa Sowerby	Lois	Written 1924
2015	Death of a Comedian	Owen McCafferty	Girlfriend	Contemporary; Abbey Theatre, 20 performances
