= Snowpiercer (graphic novel series) =

1982 graphic novel by Benjamin Legrand

- French language book cover
- Date: 1982
- Publisher: Casterman

Creative team
- Writers: Jacques Lob; Benjamin Legrand; Olivier Bouquet; Alexis Nolent
- Artist: Jean-Marc Rochette

Original publication
- Published in: À Suivre
- Language: French

Translation
- Publisher: Titan Comics
- Date: 2014

Snowpiercer (French: Le Transperceneige [lə tʁɑ̃spɛʁsnɛʒ]) is a four-volume post-apocalyptic, climate fiction graphic novel written by Jacques Lob and illustrated by Jean-Marc Rochette. The first volume was serialized in 1982 and published by Casterman under the title Le Transperceneige and later retitled The Escape. The series was continued in two volumes by writer Benjamin Legrand, replacing Jacques Lob, with The Explorers published in 1999 and The Crossing in 2000. A fourth volume, Terminus, was written by Olivier Bocquet and published in 2015, as a conclusion to the series.

Titan Comics localized the series in English into three volumes with Snowpiercer: The Explorers compiled with The Crossing. It was followed by a prequel series in 2019. The graphic novel became internationally popular following its adaptation as a 2013 film and a television series (2020–2024).

== Plot ==
=== The Escape ===
After an environmental catastrophe induces an ice age, humanity occupies a 1,001-car train called the Snowpiercer. As the story begins, a man named Proloff is quarantined after escaping from the rearmost cars, and is joined by a woman named Adeline Belleau. She is part of a movement to integrate the members of the back railway cars, who live in squalid conditions, into the rest of the train. Trying to rescue Proloff, Belleau is placed under quarantine with him. The two are eventually called to meet Colonel Krimson, passing through several train cars. As they advance, Proloff and Belleau observe fresh fruit, vegetables, and meat, luxuries that they believed were extinct.

Krimson explains to Proloff and Belleau that the Snowpiercer has begun to slow down, and asks Proloff and Belleau's assistance in advancing the occupants of the rear of the train, to enable the rear cars' disconnection. Belleau and the members of her group agree, but Proloff learns that Krimson intends to disconnect the rear cars while his friends are aboard them. After warning Belleau's friends, Belleau and Proloff flee to the front of the train, pursued by the military. At the same time a virus, presumably spread by Proloff, is infecting others aboard the train, and the healthy advance to the front.

Before reaching the engine of the Snowpiercer, Proloff breaks all the windows in the final car for unknown reasons. Belleau dies of the cold while Proloff is rescued by Alec Forrester, the engineer behind the Snowpiercer, who appoints him caretaker of 'Olga', the engine. As they are talking, the rear cars are disconnected. Proloff replaces Forrester as Olga's guardian but realizes that the virus has killed everyone else on board and that his own days are numbered as the train cannot run forever.

=== The Explorers ===
After losing contact with the Snowpiercer, the passengers of the second train, Icebreaker, fear a collision. Several explorers are sent on a braking exercise, where they stop the train. Only one explorer returns alive and soon disappears. Seventeen years later, Puig Vallès joins one of the now semi-regular braking exercises to avoid collision with the Snowpiercer. Puig disobeys orders during the braking exercise, so in retaliation, he is falsely accused of murdering one of his fellow explorers. He is sentenced to fly a small plane on what is deemed a suicidal scouting mission. Puig flies ahead of the train, spots a downed bridge, and warns the train, but the council wants him dead and refuses to allow him to return and land his plane. Puig threatens to crash his plane into the train and derail it, while his lover Val broadcasts footage to everyone aboard the train. Their efforts force the council to spin the event such that Puig is now hailed as a hero for saving the train.

It is then revealed to Puig that during the first braking exercise, the Icebreaker collided with Snowpiercer, and its engine was brought aboard. The sole surviving explorer has since been tending to the engine along with Proloff, who only talks to the engine. The council maintains the myth that the Snowpiercer is out of control and still circling the world, to control the populace with fear.

=== The Crossing ===
The train detects a radio signal originating from across the frozen ocean. Puig decides to follow the radio music to its source, and it is revealed that the train can travel off the tracks by mounting caterpillar treads. Living standards deteriorate aboard the train, culminating in a failed but disastrous revolt where many people are killed, and numerous cars and resources are destroyed, making living conditions unsustainable. The train finally crosses the frozen ocean and reaches the source of the music, but the explorers are devastated to discover there are no people—only an automated signal.

=== Terminus ===
With no more heat or food on the train, the passengers of the Icebreaker rebel and elect Laura Lewis as their new leader. Puig learns that Val is pregnant, and his explorers seek the source of the radio station's power. They discover the radio station is the top floor of a skyscraper and the ground floor is a train station. They turn on beacons allowing the Icebreaker to crash into the station, providing shelter but trapping and critically damaging the train. Laura holds Puig responsible for the decision to cross the ocean and the train's eventual destruction and arrests him.

While exploring the station, the passengers are seized by people wearing mice masks. The passengers are given food, but put in quarantine and inoculated for disease. The passengers are permitted to join the mice community but are forced to be barcoded and blood-tested, and children and pregnant women are taken away for "special treatment." Val uses a distraction to barcode herself and avoid a blood test, which would expose her pregnancy. It is revealed that the compound is a hybrid research laboratory and amusement park named Future Land. Its deranged founders, the "switchmen", have prolonged their life by using the stem cells of babies, and used the radio signal to lure all the other trains to them: There were ten perpetual trains, of which Icebreaker was the last of seven that successfully reached the station. It is further revealed that the switchmen have neutered all the mice and performed genetic experiments on fetuses and babies, in a misguided attempt to engineer a perfect human species. Laura betrays Val, who is taken to the switchmen.

While these events transpired, Puig escaped his captivity and recovered with the engineer's aid. Under disguise as a mouse, Puig uncovers that the nuclear plant that powers the compound is leaking and slowly killing the population. Puig reunites with Tom (the former radarist), Val, and the other explorers, and together they free the children and animals held in captivity. They return to the Icebreaker, which the engineer has repaired, but are confronted by armed mice. Puig describes the situation and appeals to them to join him and the other passengers, and many of the mice defect. When Laura tries to stop them from escaping, she is run over by the train.

The story ends in the future: Hunters have just killed a killer whale, and as Puig dies of old age, a glimpse of flowers growing out of a patch of thawed earth is shown.

=== The Prequel ===
Explores the events leading up to The Escape. Written by Matz (Alexis Nolent) and illustrated by Jean-Marc Rochette. The first volume is set before the mass extinction event that caused the ice age. The second volume is set days after the extinction event. The third and final volume was released in 2023, and is set a short time after the extinction event.

== Production ==
Snowpiercer began as a single stand alone graphic novel written by Jacques Lob and illustrated by Jean-Marc Rochette. Lob was originally collaborating with Alexis but due to his death, he only completed ten pages. Lob searched for a new artist for four years until partnering with Rochette. According to Rochette, the graphic novel series' themes are modeled after society and says the things people don't want to hear.

After the death of Jacques Lob, Rochette approached Benjamin Legrand to write a sequel in Lob's memory. Legrand developed the story to have a second train alongside the first with passengers living in fear of colliding with it.

== Publication history ==
Snowpiercer is a four-volume graphic novel series published in France by Casterman between 1982 and 2015. The first volume was written by Jacques Lob and illustrated by Jean-Marc Rochette. The graphic novel was first published in 1982 under the title Le Transperceneige and later retitled The Escape. The series was continued in two volumes by writer Benjamin Legrand, replacing Jacques Lob, with The Explorers published in 1999 and The Crossing in 2000. A fourth volume, Terminus, was written by Olivier Bocquet and published in 2015, as a conclusion to the series.

Titan Comics published an English translation in 2014. consisting of two volumes: Snowpiercer: The Escape and Snowpiercer: The Explorers (which also contains The Crossing). A third volume, Terminus, was released in 2016, followed by a prequel series in 2019. The graphic novel became internationally popular following its adaptation as a 2013 film and a television series (2020–2024).

== Adaptations ==
=== Film ===
Korean director Bong Joon-ho adapted the graphic novel into a film Snowpiercer and released in 2013. It was released the following year in the United States.

=== TV series ===
A Snowpiercer television series was developed with Josh Friedman writing and Bong as executive producer. In November 2016, TNT ordered a series pilot episode from Tomorrow Studios. In May 2017 it was reported that Daveed Diggs would star in the series and Scott Derrickson would direct the pilot and executive produce the series. Derrickson filmed a feature-length pilot episode but refused to do the extreme reshoots requested by the new showrunner who wanted to take the show in a different direction. The series debuted on TNT on May 17, 2020. The series moved to AMC for its fourth and final season.
