= Jean-Marc Rochette =

French artist

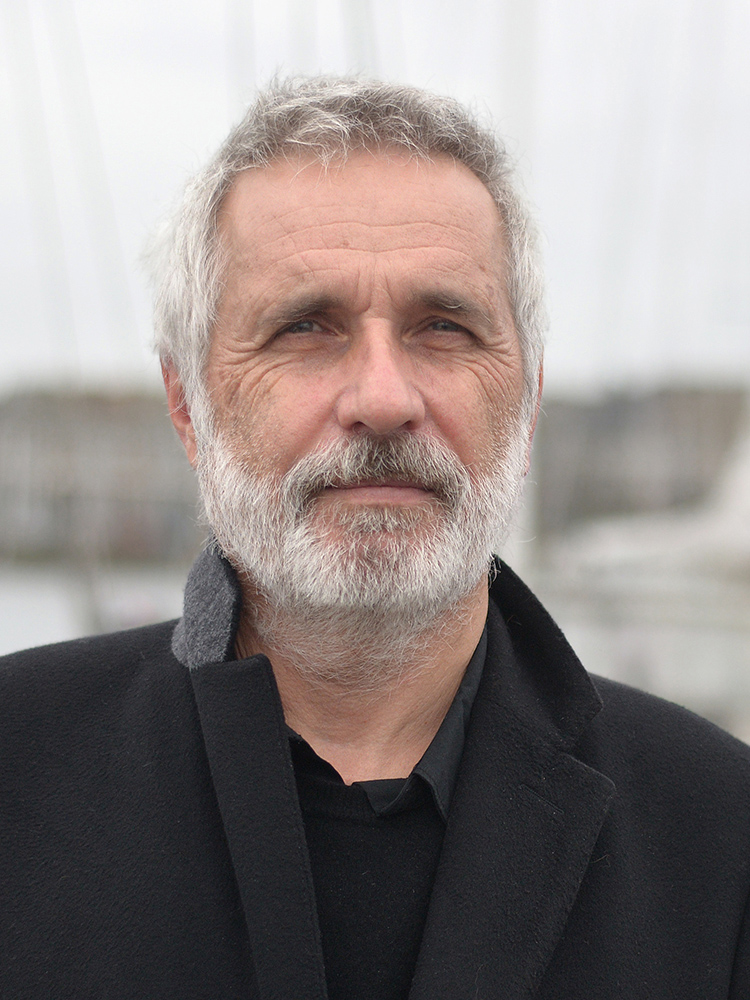
- Jean-Marc Rochette, 2015
- Born: 23 April 1956 (age 70) Baden-Baden, West Germany
- Areas: Writer, Artist
- Notable works: Edmond le Cochon; Le Transperceneige

Jean-Marc Rochette (born 23 April 1956) is a French painter, illustrator and comics creator.

He is best known and recognized for the comic book series Edmond le Cochon and Le Transperceneige, as well as for his illustrations of the literary classic Candide ou l'optimisme by Voltaire, and Homer's Odyssey.

== Career ==
Jean-Marc Rochette became known as a comic creator and illustrator with the story of Edmond le Cochon, with Martin Veyron, and (in succession of Alexis) Le Transperceneige, initially with Jacques Lob and later with Benjamin Legrand. Le Transperceneige received the Angoulême Religious Award in 1985, which was the award's first year. Other comic stories include Claudius Vigne, Napoléon et Bonaparte (Angoulême Humour Award in 2001), Nemo le capitaine vengeur with Jean-Pierre Hugot, L'or et l'esprit with Benjamin Legrand, Cour Royale with Martin Veyron (Nomination for the Angoulême Audience Award in 2006), and the trilogy Louis et Dico: Panique à Londres/Scandale à New York/Triomphe à Hollywood with René Pétillon.

Besides creating and illustrating comic stories, he also illustrated several children's books and well-known fairy tales, for example Coyote mauve, which was also translated in English (Purple Coyote), Pinocchio, Le petit poucet (the French version of Tom Thumb) and Le chat botté (Puss 'n' Boots). He gained further reputation for his watercolor illustrations of the literature classics Candide by Voltaire and Homer's Odyssey. As a painter, his works include watercolor as well as oil paintings, and figurative as well as abstract interpretations of themes.

== Bibliography ==
=== Comics ===
- Edmond le cochon (1980 - 1993 with Martin Veyron)
  - No. 1: Edmond le cochon, Editions du Fromage 1980, ISBN 978-2-902503-39-1
  - No. 2: Edmond le cochon va en afrique (1981), Albin Michel - l'Echo des Savanes 1983, ISBN 978-2-226-01475-7
  - No. 3: Le continent mystérieux (1983), Albin Michel 1996, ISBN 978-2-226-08757-7
  - No. 4: Le mystère continental, Albin Michel 1993, ISBN 978-2-226-06189-8
- Les dépoteurs de chrysanthèmes (drawing and story), Futuropolis 1980, ISBN 978-2-7376-5406-0
- Le Transperceneige (1984–2000)
  - No. 1: L'Échappe (drawing) with Jacques Lob (story), Casterman 1984, ISBN 978-2-203-33418-2
  - No. 2: L'Arpenteur (drawing) with Benjamin Legrand (story), Casterman 1999, ISBN 978-2-203-33479-3
  - No. 3: La Traversée (drawing) with Benjamin Legrand (story), Casterman 2000, ISBN 978-2-203-33489-2
- A tes souhaits (drawing) with T. Topin (story), Futuropolis 1985, ISBN 2-7376-5454-8
- Claudius Vigne touche le fond (drawing and story), Casterman 1985, ISBN 978-2-203-33523-3
- Requiem blanc (drawing) with Benjamin Legrand (story), Casterman 1987, ISBN 2-203-33436-3, ISBN 978-2-203-33436-6
- Nemo, le capitaine vengeur (drawing) with Jean-Pierre Hugot (storyboard), featuring Jules Verne's fictional character Captain Nemo, Bayard 1988, ISBN 978-2-7009-4053-4
- L'Or & l'esprit 1, Le Tribut (drawing) with Benjamin Legrand (story), Casterman 1995, ISBN 978-2-203-38888-8
- Napoléon et Bonaparte (story and drawing), Casterman 2000, ISBN 978-2-203-38888-8
- Louis et Dico - à la conquete du monde (2003 - 2006 with René Pétillon)
  - Panique à Londres (drawing), Albin Michel 2003, ISBN 978-2-226-13823-1
  - Scandale à New York' (drawing), Albin Michel 2004, ISBN 978-2-226-15250-3
  - Triomphe à Hollywood (drawing), Albin Michel 2006, ISBN 978-2-226-17550-2
- Cour royale (drawing) with Martin Veyron (story), Albin Michel 2005, ISBN 978-2-226-16669-2
- TooLoose, with Martin Veyron, Blutch, Baru, Jean-Bernard Pouy, Casterman 2007, ISBN 978-2-203-00460-3
- Ailefroide, altitude 3954, with Olivier Bocquet, Casterman, 2018 ISBN 978-2-203-12193-5
- Le Loup (bande dessinée), Casterman, 2019 ISBN 978-2-203-19677-3
- Le Transperceneige: Extinctions - vol1, with Matz (comics), Casterman, 2019 ISBN 978-2203165816
- La Dernière Reine, Casterman, 2022

=== Illustrations ===
==== Children's books ====
- Coyote mauve with Jean-Luc Cornette, L'école des loisirs 1997, ISBN 978-2-211-04468-4
  - in English: Purple Coyote, Random House Children's Books 1999, ISBN 978-0-385-32664-3
- Pizza quatre saisons with Jean-Luc Cornette, L'école des Loisirs 1997, ISBN 978-2-211-04326-7
- C'est difficile à dire with Jean-Luc Cornette, Seuil 1998, ISBN 2-02-034881-0
- Le joli petit cafard with Jean-Luc Cornette, Le Seuil 1998, ISBN 978-2-02-032348-2
- Pinocchio, French translation of the Italian novel for children by Carlo Collodi, Casterman 2000, ISBN 978-2-203-14282-4
- Le petit poucet by Charles Perrault, French fairy tale paralleling the story of Tom Thumb, Casterman 2001, ISBN 978-2-203-14295-4
  - in Spanish: Pulgarcito, Blume 2005, ISBN 978-84-9801-035-0
- Le chat botté (Puss 'n' Boots), French version of the European fairy tale by Charles Perrault, Casterman 2002, ISBN 978-2-203-56514-2
  - in Spanish: El gato con botas, Blume 2005, ISBN 978-84-9801-031-2
- La fille du pirate with Béatrice Bottet, Bayard Jeunesse 2004, ISBN 978-2-7470-1320-8

==== Classics ====
- Candide ou l'optimisme by French writer and philosopher Voltaire, Albin Michel 2002, ISBN 978-2-226-12935-2
- L'Odyssée (Odyssey), French translation by Mario Meunier of the Greek epic poem attributed to Homer, Albin Michel 2006, ISBN 978-2-226-15210-7

== Awards ==
- 1985: Religious Award at the Angoulême International Comics Festival, for Le Transperceneige, with Jacques Lob
- 2001: Humour Award at the Angoulême International Comics Festival, for Napoléon et Bonaparte
- 2006: nomination for the Audience Award at the Angoulême International Comics Festival, for Cour Royale, with Martin Veyron
