= Philippe Vuillemin =

French cartoonist

- Born: 8 September 1958 Marseille, France
- Area: Cartoonist
- Awards: Grand Prix de la ville d'Angoulême, 1995

Philippe Vuillemin (French: [vɥijmɛ̃]; born 1958) is a French cartoonist.

== Early years ==
His father was inspector for music royalties organization Sacem who along with his son travelled around the country to collect fees. Vuillemin, between 11 and 15 years old, spent time away from his Marseilles birthplace in Corsica and Orléans. He subsequently recalled he "got horny for the first time at 13 years old over a story by Crumb.” At 18 he went to Paris, where he shaved his head and joined a punk rock band, while unloading trucks six hours a day.

== Comics ==
Cover of album Raoul Teigneux contre les Druzes, 1988

Around 1977, Vuillemin began his work in the field of comics with short stories published in L'Écho des savanes, Hara-Kiri, and Charlie Mensuel. From his start, he was drawing in "bold and rough lines", similar to the style of Jean-Marc Reiser or even Jack Davis. This being the opposite of the ligne claire ("clear line") of cartoonists such as Hergé, critics called it ligne crade ("filthy line"), a term Vuillemin characterized as bêta ("stupido").

In the 1980s, he worked for L'Hebdo of Switzerland, Zoulou magazine, and other publications.

In 1988, Vuillemin published the comic series Hitler = SS on a Jean-Marie Gourio scenario. Both artists were subsequently indicted for "complicity in racial injury" and tried at the 17th correctional tribunal of Paris. They were represented by high-profile criminal lawyer Thierry Lévy who'd previously defended members of terrorist group Action directe. The two defendants received a symbolic penalty of 1 franc but the work was banned in its serial version, while the integral, album version was prohibited to minors and not allowed to be exhibited anywhere.

In 1995, Vuillemin won the Grand Prix of the city of Angoulême, a decision that angered jury member Belgian cartoonist and Lucky Luke creator Morris who left the award ceremony in protest.

In 2015, he joined the satirical weekly Charlie Hebdo.

== Acting ==
Vuillemin starred in René Féret's 1985 drama The Mystery of Alexina. He also acted in Claude Confortès' Paulette, la pauvre petite milliardaire (Paulette, the poor little millionairess), which featured other cartoonists as well, such as Gébé, Georges Pichard, Georges Wolinski, Siné, and Willem.
