= Jacques-Armand Cardon =

French cartoonist and illustrator (1936–2026)

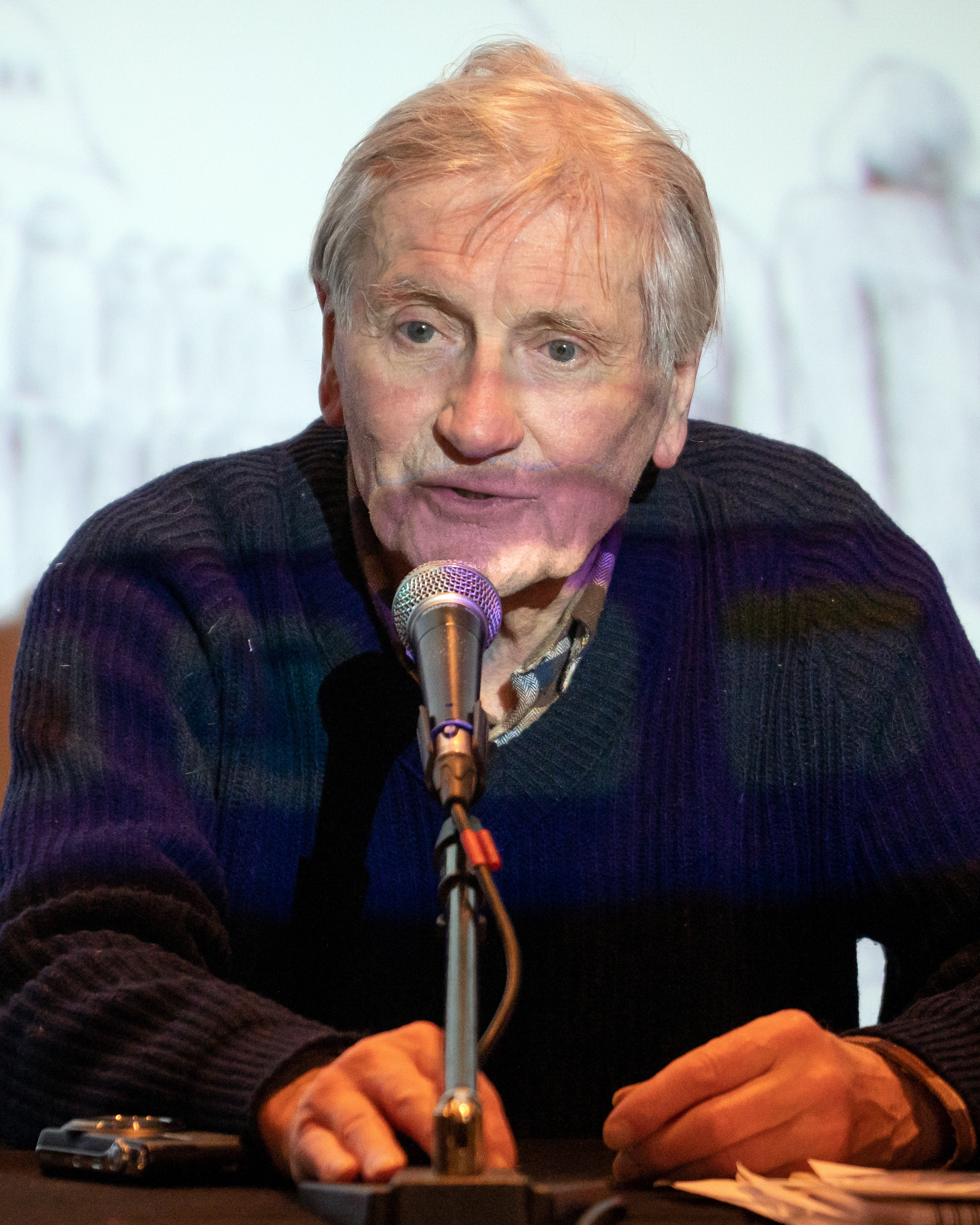
- Cardon in 2023
- Born: 30 November 1936; Le Havre, France
- Died: 5 April 2026 (aged 89); Angers, France
- Occupations: Cartoonist; Illustrator

Jacques-Armand Cardon (French: [ʒˈak-aʁmˈɑ̃ kaʁdˈɔ̃]; 30 November 1936 – 5 April 2026) was a French cartoonist and illustrator.

== Life and career ==
Born in Le Havre on 30 November 1936, Cardon's father was imprisoned in 1940 and killed in captivity in 1942. He spent his youth in Brittany and survived there through World War II. He witnessed the reconstruction of Lorient and lived in the barracks of the Château de Soye in Morbihan. He completed his military service in Toulon and studied lithography. In 1961, he published his first drawings in Bizarre by Jean-Jacques Pauvert. He then joined the staff of the magazine Hara-Kiri alongside the likes of Cabu, Georges Wolinski, Fred, Roland Topor, and Professeur Choron. In the 1981, he illustrated a seven-minute short film titled L'Empreinte, directed by Henri Lacam. The film was screened at the Cannes Film Festival. In 2002, he published a monography of his works titled Cardon, dessins. In 2010, a retrospective album titled Cardon, vu de dos - trente ans de dessins plus que politiques was published in his honor by L'Échappée, which received praise from Le Point. In 2020, he released his final work, titled Cathédrale Cardon. In 2022, his works created in L'Humanité Dimanche and Politique Hebdo between 1970 and 1976 were republished; this collective work was nominated for the Angoulême International Comics Festival Prize for Inheritance in 2023.

Cardon died in Angers on 5 April 2026, at the age of 89.

== Publications ==
- La Véridique Histoire des compteurs à air (1972)
- Ligne de fuite (1973)
- L'Apocalypse est pour demain ou les aventures de Robin Cruso (1977)
- Comment crier et quoi (1986)
- Les Sursitaires (1995)
- Cardon, dessins (2002)
- Cardon vu de dos : trente ans de dessins plus que politiques (2010)
- Cathédrale Cardon (2020)
- Ras le bol (2022)
