= The Year 01 =

- Directed by: Jacques Doillon; Alain Resnais; Jean Rouch
- Written by: Gébé
- Cinematography: Gérard de Battista; William Lubtchansky
- Edited by: Noëlle Boisson
- Music by: François Béranger; Jean-Marie Dusuzeau
- Distributed by: Cinémas Associés; MK2 Éditions
- Release date: 22 February 1973
- Running time: 90 min.
- Country: France
- Language: French
- Box office: $1.9 million

The Year 01 (French: L'An 01) is a French comedy film, directed by Jacques Doillon, Alain Resnais and Jean Rouch released in 1973. It is based on the eponymous comic strip by Gébé and has gained cult film status.

== Synopsis ==
The film narrates a utopian, consensual and festive abandonment of the market economy and high productivity. The population decides on a number of resolutions, beginning with "Let's stop everything," and the second "After a period of total stoppage, let's bring back — reluctantly — just the services and products we can't do without. Probably : water to drink, electricity for reading at night, the radio to say 'This is not the end of the world, this is Year 1, and now a page of Celestial Mechanics." The implementation of these resolutions is the first day of a new era, Year 1. L'An 01 is emblematic of the challenge of the 1970s and covers such diverse topics as ecology, negation of authority, free love, communal living, rejection of private property and labor.

== Cast ==
More than 300 people. Notable people include

- Daniel Auteuil
- Josiane Balasko
- François Béranger
- Isabelle de Botton
- Madeleine Bouchez
- Romain Bouteille
- Cabu
- Jacques Canselier
- François Cavanna
- Professeur Choron
- Christian Clavier
- Coluche
- Christine Dejoux
- Albert Delpy
- Gérard Depardieu
- Delfeil de Ton
- Charlotte Dubreuil
- Jean-Paul Farré
- Lee Falk
- Marcel Gassouk
- Gébé
- Marcel Gotlib
- Henri Guybet
- Jacques Higelin
- Gérard Jugnot
- Nelly Kaplan
- Daniel Laloux
- Martin Lamotte
- Patrice Leconte
- Stan Lee
- Thierry Lhermitte
- René Marjac
- Miou-Miou
- Patrice Minet
- David Pascal
- Marie Pillet
- Daniel Prévost
- Maud Rayer
- Jacques Robiolles
- Alain Scoff
- Susan Shapiro
- Philippe Starck
- Jean-Paul Tribout
- Frederic Tuten
- Georges Wolinski
- Guillaume Weill-Raynal
