= List of feature films with intersex characters =

This is a list of films with fictional and factual intersex characters. The films were released theatrically, direct-to-video, or on a streaming platform (non-linear network).

This list does not include documentaries, which are included in the categories of LGBTQ-related films by decade, or animated intersex characters, which are noted in List of fictional intersex characters. Various live-action films feature either intersex issues as a plot element or have intersex characters.

Films are in alphabetical order by year of release. Titles beginning with determiners "A", "An", and "The" are alphabetized by the first significant word.

== 20th century ==
=== 1900–1959 ===
Year	Title	Character(s)	Actor	Notes	Country	Ref(s)
1919	Aus eines Mannes Mädchenjahren (A Man's Girlhood)	Franziska	Erika Glässner	Loosely adapted from Karl M. Baer's 1907 Memoirs of a Man's Maiden Years, this silent-era drama explores gender identity through the tragic story of Franziska, heir to an entailed estate. Born with intersex traits, Franziska is raised as a boy to secure the family inheritance—until a blackmailer forces them to live as a girl. Unaware of their biology, Franziska struggles with societal expectations, culminating in a failed arranged marriage, psychological unraveling, and eventual suicide. An autopsy reveals their intersex condition. Today, there are no known surviving prints of the film.	Germany	
1919	Different from the Others	Slideshow including intersex persons	One of them was 'Raspania' (uncredited), an intersex person who worked for the German circus Sarrasani.	In a lecture on the natural diversity of the sexual and gender spectrum, the Doctor, a character portrayed by Magnus Hirschfeld, displays images of women with masculine traits and men with feminine traits, including intersex individuals.	Germany	
1927	Gesetze der Liebe (Laws of Love)	Slideshow including intersex persons	'Raspania' (credited)	A doctor (Magnus Hirschfeld) gives a lecture on sexuality in nature, discussing human sexuality and its natural variations, which are anomalous yet nonpathological.	Germany	
1932	The Blood of a Poet	Intersex body	Possibly as a mirrored reflection of the main character's soul (played by Enrique Riveros).	In front of the fourth door, side by side, stand two shoes—a man's and a woman's. “In room nineteen, the desperate rendezvous of hermaphrodites take place,” remarks the narrator. The main character peeks through the keyhole: Drawn in chalk, an intersex body gradually emerges to the sound of a drumroll. Real male arms extend out of the drawing, followed by human legs and the face of a Gorgon. A sign concealing the sexual organs bears the warning: "Danger of death."	France	
1932	Freaks	Half Woman-Half Man	Josephine Joseph	Josephine Joseph's only acting performance is the first (mis)representation of an intersex person in cinema.	United States	
1953	Glen or Glenda	Alan/Anne	'Tommy' Haynes	Ed Wood's docudrama advocates for tolerance and explores gender roles and social issues in the postwar era, offering a provocative discussion on gender politics. Alan is a war veteran and "pseudo-hermaphrodite", who decides to undergo gender-affirming surgery to become a woman, Anne.	United States	

=== 1960–1969 ===
Year	Title	Character(s)	Actor	Notes	Country	Ref(s)
1965	The Mandrake	L'Uomo-Donna (The Man-Woman)	Donato Castellaneta	In a street market, a person is shown with a masculine appearance on one side and a feminine one on the other, including unilateral gynecomastia.	Italy, France	
1969	Fellini Satyricon	Hermaphroditus	Pasquale Baldassarre	Fellini's Satyricon is a representation of the "otherness" of the unconscious. The albino Hermaphroditus, demigod and oracle (that must be kept constantly wet or he will die) is "the mouthpiece of the gods". On set Eileen Hughes asked Eugene Walter (the American dialogue coach) why Fellini wanted a "hermaphrodite" in the film: "Nowadays, if a family had a hermaphrodite, they would keep it a deep dark secret or have an operation, but in these times, it is a magical thing, a gift of the gods, and the child becomes an oracle."	Italy	
1969	The Labyrinth of Sex	Roberta/Robert X	uncredited	After informing the audience about the causes of homosexuality and various fetishes with a lot of Freudian mambo-jambo, Alfonso Brescia's "informative" docudrama turns its focus to intersex people. It tells the story of Roberta/Robert X, showing actual footage of their final surgery. The film then presents a few cases of "malformations" in children, arguing that operations on them are necessary to prevent "psychic trauma".	Italy	

=== 1970–1979 ===
Year	Title	Character(s)	Actor	Notes	Country	Ref(s)
1970	I Killed Einstein, Gentlemen	all women in the first timeline	Jana Brejchová, etc.	In this science fiction comedy (filmed at the end of the summer of 1968, after the Prague Spring), set in a "distant," dystopian future following an atomic holocaust, women have become infertile and bearded. To save humanity's future, they decide the best course of action is to travel back in time and kill Einstein. However, the mission fails when Doctor Given (Jana Brejchová) falls in love with the young Einstein. As an alternative, she marries him and persuades him to abandon physics in favor of becoming a violinist. The team succeeds in changing the timeline... only to discover that World War III ends in a chemical holocaust, and now, men grow breasts and have high-pitched voices.	Czechoslovakia	
1970	I Killed Einstein, Gentlemen	all men in the second timeline			Czechoslovakia	
1970	Tintomara	Tintomara	Pia Grønning	Based on the novel Drottningens juvelsmycke by Jonas Love Almqvist featuring one of Swedish literature's most enduringly popular characters, the eponymous androgyne Tintomara.	Sweden, Denmark	
1972	My Dearest Senorita	Adela/Juan Castro	José Luis López Vázquez	Adela Castro is an intersex woman raised under Francoist Spain's rigid gender norms. After decades living as a spinster, she discovers through medical intervention that she is biologically male. Pressured by societal and institutional forces (Church, medicine, and heteronormativity), she undergoes masculinizing surgery and transitions to living as "Juan." Moving to Madrid for a fresh start, Juan struggles with his new identity—his legal documents still identify him as female, creating bureaucratic and social obstacles.	Spain	
1973	The Final Programme	Miss Brunner merged with Jerry Cornelius	Jon Finch	Dystopian sci-fi based on the novel The Final Programme by Michael Moorcock.	UK	
1973	The Holy Mountain	Old "hermaphrodite"	uncredited	Near the end of the movie, at the summit of the mountain, a pilgrim lifts a sheet to reveal an elderly "hermaphrodite". The pilgrim drinks milk from one of their breasts, which then transforms into jaguar heads. The "hermaphrodite" proceeds to shower the pilgrim with milk.	Mexico	
1976	God Told Me To	Bernard Phillips	Richard Lynch	Bernard Phillips, a messiah and cult leader who was virgin-born (via alien immaculate conception), has a vagina on their chest and seeks to spawn a new species. Director Larry Cohen: "...the whole idea of the mating between the Detective and the alien came from the fact that Richard Lynch literally had this big crevice in his chest that looked like a vagina. I saw that and said, “Well, here’s something new we can do.”" (more than 70% of his skin was burned in an accident)	United States	
1976	Private Vices, Public Pleasures	Mary Vetsera	Teresa Ann Savoy	Losely based on the Mayerling incident, the director Miklós Jancsó, decided to portray Mary Vetsera as intersex.	Italy, Yugoslavia	

=== 1980–1989 ===
Year	Title	Character(s)	Actor	Notes	Country	Ref(s)
1980	Eva Man (Due sessi in uno)	Eva Man	Eva Robin's	In this (inter)sexploitation comedy the protagonist is an (inter)sex machine. Given the genre of the film, it likely stems purely from a voyeuristic perspective, but it is worth mentioning that the surgeon refused to perform gender-affirming surgery on Eva, stating: "She asked me to transform her into a woman, like so many 'hermaphrodites' who are forced to choose between one or the other gender. But seeing what a 'marvelous example of hermaphroditism' she is, I couldn't do it."	Italy, Spain	
1981	Deadly Blessing	Faith Stohler	Lisa Hartman	A strange string of murders begins, seemingly carried out by Hartman, an intersex neighbor with an intense need to shut out anyone from Jensen's life.	United States	
1983	Appearances Are Deceptive	Adriana/Adrián	Isela Vega	In a provincial bourgeoisie with rigidly defined roles regarding gender, social status, and more, appearances are of utmost importance. Bit by bit, Jaime Humberto Hermosillo's film peels back the mask of Mexico's hypocritical society in the late 1970s. The theme of what it means to be intersex is only briefly touched upon: when Adrian begins to develop breasts during puberty, they disappear. A few years later, a mysterious niece, Adriana, appears. The life of an intersex person is portrayed as one of secrecy, particularly surrounding their genitals, reflecting the societal stigma and shame often imposed on those who do not fit binary norms. Adriana's insistence on preserving their virginity until marriage is a way to keep their genitals a secret, avoiding questions or scrutiny about their body. Nevertheless, while they fear society's condemnation, they like their body. After all, they exclaim: "I am perfect!" in response to Rogelio's joke: "Why are you so afraid of losing your virginity? I think you are defective." Intersexuality is used here to introduce an element that, at the time, was considered "monstrous" and morally ambiguous.	Mexico	
1985	The Mystery of Alexina	Herculine Barbin	Philippe Vuillemin	Based on the story of Herculine Barbin.	France	
1985	Enemy Mine	Jeriba Shigan	Louis Gossett Jr.	Based on Enemy Mine by Barry B. Longyear. Will: "Oh, my God! Are you telling me you're pregnant? [...] But how'd..." Jeriba: "With you humans,... birth is a matter of choice. With us Dracs,... it happens. When the time comes,... it just happens."	United States	
1986	Entrails of a Beautiful Woman	"Zombie-hermaphrodite" (Hiromi melted with a gangster)		Hiromi, a female psychologist seeks revenge on a yakuza clan involved in trafficking women as sexual slaves. After being brutally gang-raped, murdered, and dismembered, she is buried alongside the body of a gangster. The two corpses fuse together, their remains melting into a single, horrifying "zombie-hermaphrodite" with grotesque genitalia.	Japan	
1986	Never Too Young to Die	Velvet von Ragner	Gene Simmons (bassist of Kiss)	In this film, sexual otherness is portrayed as evil: Velvet von Ragner is a sinister hermaphrodite, bisexual drag queen, and cult leader aiming to seize control of Los Angeles.	United States	

=== 1990–1999 ===
Year	Title	Character(s)	Actor	Notes	Country	Ref(s)
1994	Angel Dust	Tomoo Suma	Etsushi Toyokawa	After forensic psychiatrist Dr. Setsuko Suma is murdered, their autopsy revealed their intersexuality.	Japan	
1994	Clerks	thematic	-	In one scene, Dante notices that Randal has rented a film titled Best of Both Worlds and asks about it. Randal explains that it is "hermaphroditic porn" featuring "starlets with both organs" and comments on their anatomy. He states that he likes to "expand his horizons." Later, Dante's ex-girlfriend, arrives at the store while Randal is watching the rented movie. There is a facetious flirt between the two. When Randal jokes about joining in with her and Dante, she responds that he "might be let down" because she is "not a hermaphrodite." Randal replies, "Few are."	United States	
1995	Ring	Sadako Yamamura	Ayane Miura	TV movie based on Koji Suzuki's novel Ring. Sadako presents as an attractive woman, but their gender is ambiguous due to having Androgen Insensitivity Syndrome. Lacking a uterus, they cannot bear children, and as a result, their life is depicted as disappointing. To make matters worse, in the end, they are raped by a man carrying the smallpox virus and then cast into a well, left to die to cover his crime. The virus inside them fuses with their own psychic abilities, giving rise to a new entity—the "Ring Virus." In a final act of desperation and defiance, they channel it from the depths of the well, sending it into the world above as both a curse and a cry for survival.	Japan	
1999	The Ring Virus	Park Eun-suh	Bae Doona	The South Korean theatrical version of Koji Suzuki's novel Ring retains Sadako's original gender identity, unlike the 1998 Japanese version, Ring, and the 2002 Hollywood version, The Ring, in which the girl in the well is female.	South Korea	
1999	Terror Firmer	Casey	Will Keenan	Casey was born with both male and female genitalia; his childhood was marked by trauma when his father, played by Ron Jeremy, amputated his penis and subjected him to sexual abuse (don't worry, he is going to pay dearly for that later in the movie). This horrific backstory, presented with grotesque, over-the-top humor, mocks other films that exploit intersex people to evoke pity for the killer, such as God Told Me To, Deadly Blessing, and Ring. In a post-credit scene, director Lloyd Kaufman makes a plea for more tolerance and against enforcing medical interventions on intersex people. Meanwhile, in the background, Matt Stone and Trey Parker, wearing fake breasts, attempt to find a bathroom for intersex but end up defecating into a dirty bucket, while making sad faces.	United States	
1999	Terror Firmer	"The Hermaphrodites" (post-credit scene)	Trey Parker and Matt Stone		United States	

== 21st century ==
=== 2000–2009 ===
Year	Title	Character(s)	Actor	Notes	Country	Ref(s)
2005	Both	Rebeca Duarte	Jackie Parker	Rebeca discovers that her gender was not what she had believed it to be. The film is partly based on the life of the director, Lisset Barcellos.	United States	
2006	Clerks II	Emma Bunting	Jennifer Schwalbach Smith (credited as Jennifer Schwalbach)	Dante's girlfriend, Emma, has an "unnaturally large clit" (clitoromegaly). Randal: D’jever think about getting an operation to scale it back or something? Make it a little more normal? Emma: Yeah - I should probably do that, huh? I mean, it’s only responsible for paralyzing orgasms.	United States	
2007	XXY	Alex Kraken	Inés Efron	The 15-year-old Alex interrupted the hormone replacement therapy without telling their parents. Without the medication, the hormones in 'her' body will gradually turn 'her' into 'him'. The mother doesn't like that; the surgeon wants to intervene. Only the father accepts Alex's choice.	Argentina, Spain, France	
2007	XXY	Juan	Guillermo Angelelli	The 15-year-old Alex interrupted the hormone replacement therapy without telling their parents. Without the medication, the hormones in 'her' body will gradually turn 'her' into 'him'. The mother doesn't like that; the surgeon wants to intervene. Only the father accepts Alex's choice.	Argentina, Spain, France	
2009	Hermafrodita	Maria	Marilu Acosta	In this tragic love triangle, La Melaza, fleeing to the countryside after a revenge murder, meets Maria, a woman with a secret: she is intersex, identifying herself as a woman. Maria's childhood best friend, Wanda, who loves her and accepts her identity without question, becomes jealous of Maria's relationship with La Melaza. One night, Wanda seduces a drunk La Melaza to frame him for infidelity, causing Maria to leave him. Consumed by obsession, La Melaza, drunk again, confronts Maria at her home. When she rejects him, he grabs her, causing her to fall and hit her head. As he rapes her unconscious body, he discovers her genitals, becomes enraged, and violently castrates her while shouting, "You wanted to be a woman? I'll make you a woman!"	Dominican Republic	
2009	The Last Summer of La Boyita	Mario	Nicolás Treise	Mario's life is told from Jorgelina's perspective, highlighting the stark contrasts between the two. Economically, Jorgelina lives a life of privilege as the daughter of a wealthy man, spending summers on her family's farm. Mario, on the other hand, is the child of the farm's caretaker, living in modest circumstances. Emotionally, Jorgelina benefits from the stability and affection of a loving father, while Mario endures rejection and mistreatment from their own father. Sexually, Jorgelina's coming-of-age is marked by curiosity and societal acceptance, while Mario's journey is fraught with confusion, stigma, and the weight of being perceived as 'other.'	Argentina, Spain, France	

=== 2010–2019 ===
Year	Title	Character(s)	Actor	Notes	Country	Ref(s)
2010	Open	Cynthia	Gaea Gaddy	Cynthia, a homeless intersex woman, finds shelter with Gen—a man undergoing gender-reassignment to merge identities with his female-born partner, Jay. Drawn to Gen's fluid existence, Cynthia develops unrequited feelings, complicating their fragile dynamic.	United States	
2011	Spork	Spork	Savannah Stehlin	14-year-old Spork faces constant mistreatment from her classmates. When her best friend Tootsie Roll injures her ankle and can no longer compete in the school Dance-Off to win $236 for visiting her imprisoned father, Spork steps up and enters the competition. The story unfolds against a backdrop of 1990s nostalgia, with Spork and Tootsie Roll embracing early '90s hip-hop and fashion, while their rivals, led by Betsy Byotch, favor 1980s styles and music. Themes of friendship, self-discovery, and resilience are highlighted as Spork navigates her challenges.	United States	
2013	Bruno & Earlene Go to Vegas	Bruno	Miles Szanto	My mother produced two eggs. XY for a boy and XX for a girl. Now, normally this would create twins. But the eggs merged and a chimera was formed. A boy was born with a uterus, an ovary and a fallopian tube.	UK, United States, France	
2014	Predestination	Agent Doe "The Barkeep"	Ethan Hawke	In this time-travel thriller, after giving birth via C-section with complications, Jane learns from the surgeon that she was born with both male and female reproductive organs. Due to the complications during childbirth, the surgeon was forced to remove her uterus and ovaries. He then proposes masculinizing surgery, which she accepts. The inclusion of intersexuality in the plot is significant primarily because it enables the predestination paradox central to the story.	Australia	
2014	Predestination	Jane/John "The Unmarried Mother"	Sarah Snook	In this time-travel thriller, after giving birth via C-section with complications, Jane learns from the surgeon that she was born with both male and female reproductive organs. Due to the complications during childbirth, the surgeon was forced to remove her uterus and ovaries. He then proposes masculinizing surgery, which she accepts. The inclusion of intersexuality in the plot is significant primarily because it enables the predestination paradox central to the story.	Australia	
2015	Arianna	Arianna	Ondina Quadri	Despite the hormonal treatments nineteen-year-old Arianna has been undergoing for years, she has not yet had her first menstrual period. Through her encounter with her young cousin Celeste, who is so different and feminine compared to her, and with Martino, with whom she has a relationship, Arianna finds herself finally confronting the true nature of her sexuality. Unbeknownst to her parents, she undergoes a medical examination: she discovers her intersex condition, caused by a deficiency of the enzyme 5α-reductase, and that at the age of three, she had been subjected to genital surgery at her parents' request.	Italy	
2018	Being Impossible	Ariel	Lucía Bedoya	Ariel, a 20-year-old seamstress, struggles with feelings of not fitting in at her job and experiences intense pain during sex with her boyfriend. After confiding in her mother, who is battling cancer, Ariel visits her childhood doctor, who diagnoses her with vaginal stenosis and prescribes medical dildos. Her life becomes more complicated when she develops feelings for Ana, a new coworker. As her pain worsens, the doctor reveals to Ariel that she was born intersex and underwent surgeries as a child to conform to a female body. This revelation deeply upsets her. Ariel begins a secret relationship with Ana, but when their coworkers discover it, she faces homophobia, further complicating her understanding of her gender identity and sexuality.	Venezuela, Colombia	
2018	Eka	Eka Sindoori	Rehana Fathima	The film, banned in India due to its violence and nudity, tells the story of Eka, an intersex woman, and Laila as they embark on a bike journey through three Indian states.	India	
2019	Metamorphosis	Adam	Gold Azeron	This coming-of-age film follows Adam, a 14-year-old boy who discovers he is intersex when puberty reveals his body doesn't conform to binary expectations. As he grapples with identity, desire, and societal pressure, his religious father insists on medical intervention to "fix" him—while Adam fiercely resists. With humor and raw honesty, the film explores the messy, emotional journey of self-acceptance, blending sexual awakening with the struggle for bodily autonomy.	Philippines	

=== 2020–2025 ===
Year	Title	Character(s)	Actor	Notes	Country	Ref(s)
2021	Born to Be Human	Shi-Nan	Ling-Wei Lee	The film exposes the medical violence inflicted on intersex people in Taiwan through the story of Shi-Nan, a schoolboy who experiences abdominal pain and blood in his urine. After a doctor reveals he is intersex and menstruating, his parents—fearing stigma and pressured by gendered expectations—hide the truth and force him into non-consensual surgery to "align" his body with his XX chromosomes. The traumatic procedure, framed as necessary care, instead causes deep physical and psychological harm, highlighting the systemic abuse intersex individuals face under coercive medical practices.	Taiwan	
2021	Neptune Frost	Neptune	Elvis Ngabo and Cheryl Isheja	The film intertwines the journeys of Matalusa, driven by his brother's death, and Neptune, a charismatic intersex visionary connected to him through prophetic visions. They unite as leaders of the "Unanimous Goldmine," a rebellious community using song and rhetoric to resist oppressive tech empires. Neptune's technokinetic abilities spread their ideology through global hacks, but when Memory's brother, Innocent—who once attacked Neptune upon discovering their intersex identity—exposes their hideout, the community is destroyed in a drone strike. As the sole survivor, Neptune defiantly reveals their existence to the world in the film's climax.	Rwanda, United States	
2023	Fitting In	Lindy	Maddie Ziegler	Lindy, a high school student, navigates the challenges of a new school while forming close bonds with her track teammate Vivian and developing a mutual crush with classmate Adam. However, her life takes a dramatic turn when she discovers she has Müllerian agenesis, a condition that means she was born without a uterus, cervix, and most of a vaginal canal. Struggling with feelings of shame and isolation, Lindy withdraws from her supportive mother and friends. As she grapples with her identity, she explores connections with an intersex acquaintance, Jax, but her inability to confide in anyone leads to reckless behavior, culminating in a drunken revelation that exposes her condition to her peers.	Canada	
2023	Fitting In	Jax	Ki Griffin		Canada	
2025	Fixed	Frankie	River Gallo	Frankie is an intersex Dobermann.	United States	

== See also ==
- List of film franchises with LGBT characters
- List of animated films with LGBT characters
- List of fictional intersex characters
