= Lists of feature films with LGBTQ characters =

The list of feature films with LGBTQ characters is split across the following pages:

- List of feature films with lesbian characters
- List of feature films with gay characters: 1900–1999
- List of feature films with gay characters: 2000s
- List of feature films with gay characters: 2010s
- List of feature films with gay characters: 2020s
- List of feature films with bisexual characters
- List of feature films with transgender characters
- List of film franchises with LGBTQ characters

== See also ==
- List of animated films with LGBTQ characters
- List of made-for-television films with LGBTQ characters
- List of feature films with intersex characters
