= Fred (cartoonist) =

French comics artist

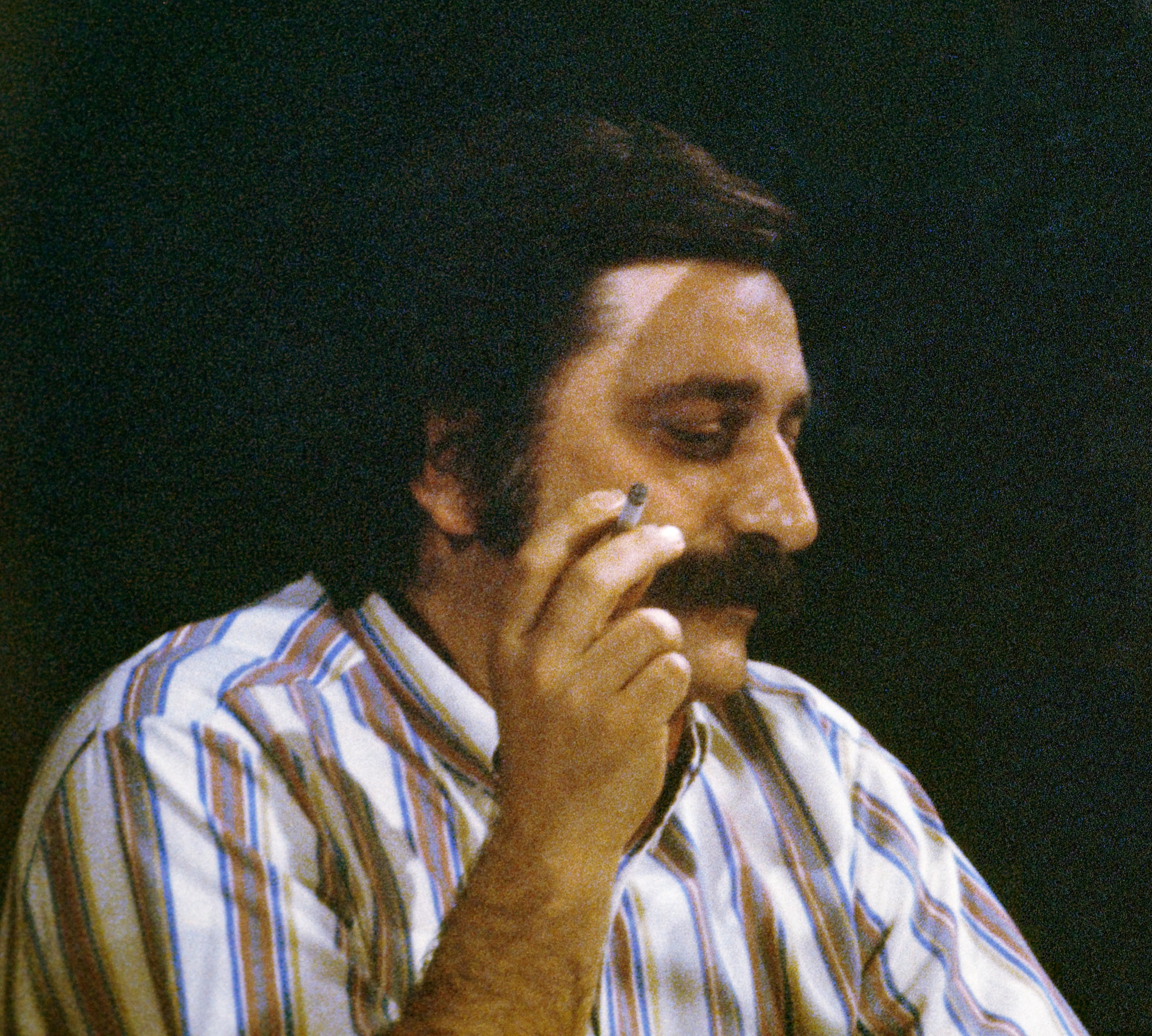
- Fred in 1973
- Born: Frédéric Othon Théodore Aristidès; 5 March 1931 Paris, France
- Died: 2 April 2013 (aged 82) Paris, France
- Areas: Αrtist, writer, colourist
- Notable works: Philémon
- Awards: Grand Prix de la ville d'Angoulême, 1980

Frédéric Othon Théodore Aristidès (5 March 1931 – 2 April 2013), known by his pseudonym Fred, was a French cartoonist in the Franco-Belgian comics tradition. He is best known for his series Philémon.

== Biography ==
Born in Paris, France, on 5 March 1931, the son of Greek immigrants, Fred began his career in his early twenties, getting a cartoon published in the magazine Zéro in 1954. The following years he was published in several magazines, both French and foreign, such as Ici Paris, France Dimanche, Punch and The New Yorker, among others. In 1960, he created the satirical journal Hara-Kiri with Georges Bernier and François Cavanna. He was the magazine's artistic director and drew its first 60 covers. Fred also wrote scenario for several artists, among others Jean-Claude Mézières, Loro, Georges Pichard, Hubuc, Mic Delinx and Alexis.

In 1980, he was awarded the Grand Prix de la ville at the seventh Angoulême International Comics Festival.

== Philémon ==
Fred's most famous creation, the surreal fantasy comic series Philémon was created in 1965, in a 15-page story intended for the Franco-Belgian comics magazine Spirou, which ultimately passed on it. René Goscinny, however, asked to publish it in Pilote magazine, which Fred agreed on the condition that he would produce the drawings himself. Goscinny agreed and the first Philémon adventure, Le Mystère de la Clairière des Trois Hiboux, was serialised. A last album, Le Train où Vont les Choses, came out on February 22, 2013. It was the first Philémon album since Le Diable du Peintre was published in 1987, and was intended to give a proper end to the series.

== Death ==
Fred died on 2 April 2013, aged 82.

== Awards ==
- 1977 : Yellow kid prize at Lucca Comics and Games.
- 1980 : Angoulême Festival Grand Prix de la ville
- 1983 : knight and 1992 officer in Ordre des Arts et des Lettres.
- 1994 : L’histoire du Corbac aux baskets Golden Wildcat.

== Bibliography ==
- Philémon series (1972–1987, 2013, Dargaud)
- Le Petit cirque (19, Dargaud, ISBN 2-205-00704-1)
- Le Fond de l'air est frais (1973, Dargaud, ISBN 2-205-00662-2)
- Timoléon (with Alexis, art)
  - Time is Money (1974, Dargaud, ISBN 2-205-00760-2)
  - 4 pas dans l'avenir (1975, Dargaud, ISBN 2-205-00872-2)
  - Joseph le borgne (1975, Dargaud, ISBN 2-205-00907-9)
- Ça va, ça vient (1977, Dargaud, ISBN 2-205-01147-2)
- Y a plus de saisons (1978, Dargaud, ISBN 2-205-01234-7)
- Le Manu Manu (1979, Dargaud, ISBN 2-205-01332-7)
- Magic Palace Hôtel (1980, Fred, ISBN 2-903937-00-1)
- Cythère l'apprentie sorcière (1980, G.P. Rouge et Or, ISBN 2-261-00778-7)
- Parade (1982, Fred, ISBN 2-903937-01-X)
- Hum (1982, Dargaud, ISBN 2-205-00836-6)
- Manège (1983, Futuropolis, ISBN 2-7376-5644-3)
- La Magique Lanterne Magique (1983, Imagerie Pellerin, ISBN 2-86207-072-6)
- Journal de Jules Renard lu par Fred (1988, Flammarion, ISBN 2-08-066129-9)
- Histoire du corbac aux baskets (1993, Dargaud, ISBN 2-205-04189-4)
- L'histoire du conteur électrique (1995, Dargaud, ISBN 2-205-04362-5)
- Le noir, la couleur et lavis (1997, Dargaud, ISBN 2-205-04704-3)
- L'Histoire de la dernière image (1999, Dargaud, ISBN 2-205-04603-9)
- Fredissimo – L'album du millénaire (2000, Dargaud, ISBN 2-205-05086-9)
