= Philémon (comics) =

French comic book series by Fred

Philémon is a series in the Franco-Belgian comics style created by French artist Fred and published by Dargaud. The series began serial publication in the French magazine Pilote on July 22, 1965, before it eventually became an album series. (Pilote was a direct response to the Franco-Belgian weeklies Spirou and Journal de Tintin, and sought to test more recent and dynamic strips on young and adolescent readers.) The general tone of the series is of fantastic realism, depicting the adventures of the young farmboy Philémon in surreal adventures featuring odd creatures in odd places, and it is considered one of the most poetic and original bande dessinée series of all time.

== Synopsis ==
Philémon is a rural French teenager. His best friend is a donkey named Anatole. Philémon's father easily gets angry and he despairs at the "tall stories" his son tells him.

Philémon's early adventures begin when, by accident, Philémon fell down a well and ended up on a beach. This well was a "portal" and Philémon ended up in an odd world, reminiscent of Alice in Wonderland in its alterations of commonly accepted reality, with strange characters which varied from people with butterfly wings to centaurs. Philémon also met Barthélémy, a well digger who had gone through the same portal and ended up trapped on an island for forty years. The island was one of many which formed the letters of the Atlantic Ocean on maps and globes. In the course of their adventures Philémon and Mr. Barthélémy would travel from between their native countryside to the various islands, using Uncle Félicien's magic.

== Main characters ==
Philémon: a teenage farm boy who finds himself traveling to the various and fantastic islands that make up the letters "Atlantic Ocean" on maps and globes.

Barthélémy: a well-digger who, while at work, found himself traveling through a portal and ending up on the first A island. Although he got to live in a beautiful palace he soon became homesick and sent messages in bottles in an attempt to get rescued from the island. This lasted 40 years before Philémon came across one such message and helped Barthélémy return home. Before long, however, Barthélémy became homesick for the island, and his desperate desire to return was the cause of many of their subsequent adventures.

Anatole: Philémon's pet donkey and best friend, who has the ability to talk.

Félicien: Philémon's uncle whose studies of magic enable him to send Barthélémy and Philémon to and from the magical lands. No method of travel can be used twice, so Félicien's methods vary from a zipper hidden in the ground to a magical barrel of water. This constant travel does cause disturbances in the fabric of reality, causing Félicien problems with the islands' authorities.

Hector: Philémon's father, who refuses to believe his son's stories and maintains his disbelief in the fantasy islands, even when he happens to go there himself (see "Le Voyage de l’incrédule" (French for "The Sceptic's Journey")).

== Film adaptation ==
In a 2013 article for Variety, Max Films announced plans to adapt Philémon into an English-language, live-action film, directed by Julien Demers-Arsenault and Sebastien Denault.

== Bibliography ==
Le voyage de l'incrédule, 1974

1. Philémon avant la lettre* (1978, Dargaud, ISBN 2-205-01230-4)
2. Philémon et le Naufragé du "A" (1972, Dargaud, ISBN 2-205-00646-0)
3. Philémon et le piano sauvage (1973, Dargaud, ISBN 2-205-00657-6)
4. Philémon et le château suspendu (1973, Dargaud, ISBN 2-205-03105-8)
5. Le voyage de l'incrédule (1974, Dargaud, ISBN 2-205-03106-6)
6. Simbabbad de Batbad (1974, Dargaud, ISBN 2-205-03107-4)
7. L'île des brigadiers (1975, Dargaud, ISBN 2-205-00870-6)
8. Philémon à l'heure du second T (1975, Dargaud, ISBN 2-205-03109-0)
9. L'arche du "A" (1976, Dargaud, ISBN 2-205-01030-1)
10. L'âne en atoll (1977, Dargaud, ISBN 2-205-01043-3)
11. La mémémoire (1977, Dargaud, ISBN 2-205-01141-3)
12. Le chat à neuf queues (1978, Dargaud, ISBN 2-205-01232-0)
13. Le secret de Félicien (1981, Dargaud, ISBN 2-205-01921-X)
14. L'enfer des épouvantails (1983, Dargaud, ISBN 2-205-02498-1)
15. Le diable du peintre (1987, Dargaud, ISBN 2-205-03117-1)

In 2013, a sixteenth book, Le Train où vont les Choses was published shortly before Fred's death, bringing a coda to the series.

^{*} A later release featuring stories (pilot episodes) published before the main series, occasionally listed as No. 0

The first English-translated version of the book was published in 2014, a year after Fred's death.

== Sources ==
- Philémon publications in Pilote BDoubliées (in French)
- Philémon albums Bedetheque (in French)
