= Aus eines Mannes Mädchenjahren =

1919 intersex drama

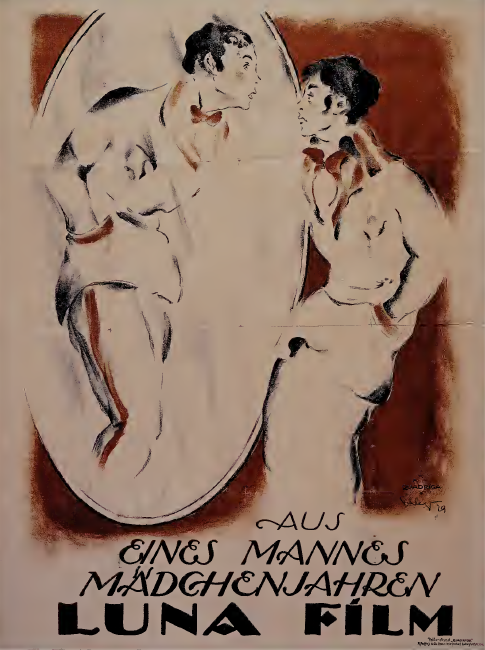
- Directed by: Julius Rode
- Written by: Karl Grune; Beate Schach
- Based on: Karl M. Baer's Memoirs of a Man's Maiden Years
- Produced by: Luna Film
- Starring: Erika Glässner; Helmut Krauss; Ernst Stahl-Nachbaur; Lotte Stein; Max Hochstetter; Irma Sernau
- Release dates: 16 October 1919 (or 17 October, Berlin)
- Running time: 75 minutes
- Country: Germany
- Language: German

Aus eines Mannes Mädchenjahren (English: "From a Man's Girlhood Years"), also known as Franziska, is a 1919 German film based on Karl M. Baer's Memoirs of a Man's Maiden Years. The film depicts the tragic life of an intersex person.

== Plot ==
No known prints of the film survive today, leaving contemporary reviews and advertisements as the primary sources for its plot. Two conflicting synopses exist:

According to Illustrierte Film-Woche (1919): The film follows Franziska, born to a nobleman as a child "of ambiguous sex." To protect the family inheritance, her father raises her as a boy until a blackmailer forces her to live as a girl. Unaware of her intersex condition, Franziska develops a preference for traditional boys' activities and companionship, yet is rejected by peer groups of both genders—excluded by boys for being perceived as feminine and disinterested in girls' social customs. Pressured into marriage as an adult, she flees on the wedding eve to work as a baron's companion. The film concludes with her fatal fall from a window; an autopsy reveals her intersexuality.

The Film-Kurier version emphasizes psychological trauma: Franziska's childhood is marked by isolation—naturally inclined toward boys' games and camaraderie but mocked for her femininity, while simultaneously alienated from girls' social circles. When her father murders a creditor during a boating accident, a witness blackmails him by demanding Franziska's hand in marriage. This coercion, combined with her lifelong struggle with gender expectations, leads to her suicide on the wedding day.

== Cast ==
- Erika Glässner as Franziska, "Bubmädchen" (boy-girl)
- Helmut Krauss
- Ernst Stahl-Nachbaur as "Bösewicht" (villain)
- Lotte Stein
- Max Hochstetter
- Irma Sernau

== Production and Advertising ==
The film was promoted as the first in a groundbreaking "Sexual-Ethical Films" series, framed as the diary of a man raised as a girl that exposes the fate of intersex individuals. Despite antisemitic protests against similar Weimar-era "enlightenment films," distributor Luna Film stressed this work never faced censorship or public backlash.

== Reception ==
The film's commercial success is attested by contemporary theater records. According to the owner of Berlin's Passage-Theater: "Due to overwhelming public demand and the film's exceptional success, I must extend its run for an additional week."

However, the film and its provocative title also drew criticism. In her 1920 essay "Kinoreform und Gemeinden", Dr. Lydia Eger cited Aus eines Mannes Mädchenjahren among examples of "Schundfilme" (trash films) that she believed called for greater censorship, though it appears she did not view the film itself and instead relied on its controversial title. She wrote: "Daß es gegenwärtig, vor allem seit Kriegsende, mit dem Schundfilm nicht besser steht, dafür sind die Anzeigen in Filmzeitschriften und Tageszeitungen ein Beweis." ("That the situation with trash films has not improved, especially since the end of the war, is evidenced by the advertisements in film magazines and daily newspapers.")

The title had already been a point of contention when the original book was published in 1907. While some critics, like Dr. Paul Näcke, praised the novel's content, he concluded his review with disapproval of its sensationalistic presentation: "Schade nur, dass bunte Titelblatt und der Titel selbst sehr nach Reklame und Sinnenkitzel riechen!" ("It's just a shame that the colorful cover and the title itself reek of advertising and titillation!")

Later, the film's poster was appropriated for Nazi propaganda. It was featured in the notorious 1937–38 antisemitic exhibition "Der ewige Jude" ("The Eternal Jew"), which sought to vilify Jewish influence in cinema and culture. The inclusion of Aus eines Mannes Mädchenjahren in this context illustrates how Weimar-era films—particularly those with provocative themes—were later exploited to fuel antisemitic narratives under the Nazi regime.
