= Professeur Choron =

French humorist (1929–2005)

Georget Bernier
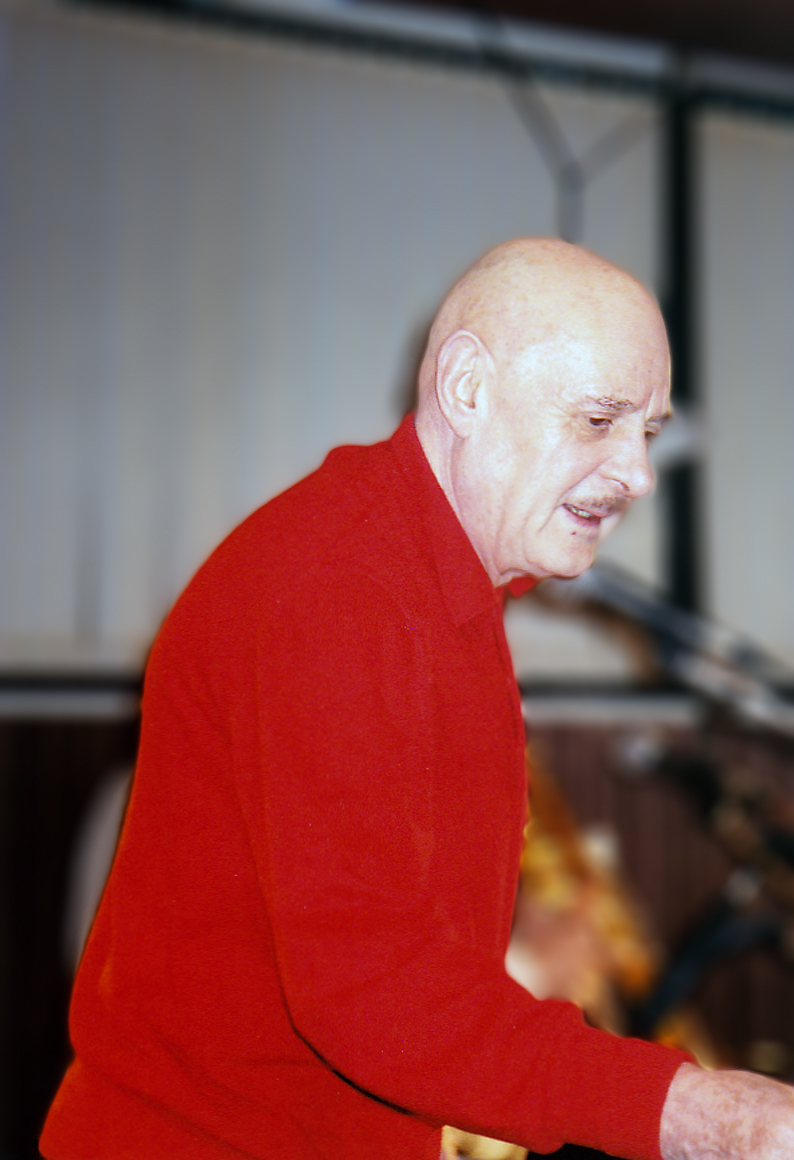
- Choron in 1996
- Born: 21 September 1929; La Neuville-aux-Bois, France
- Died: 10 January 2005 (aged 75); Paris, France
- Occupations: Humorist, journalist, writer, comics writer, singer

Georget Bernier (French: [ʒɔʁʒe bɛʁnje]; 21 September 1929 – 10 January 2005), more commonly known as Professeur Choron (pronounced [pʁɔfesœʁ ʃɔʁɔ̃]), was a French humorist and founder of Hara-Kiri magazine.

== Early years ==
Born in La Neuville-aux-Bois in Lorraine, Bernier was orphaned by his father at 11 years and without a proper education, he vacillated between many jobs before fighting in the Indochina War for 28 months. On his return he worked in the press, and rose through the ranks to take the position of sales manager of the satirical newspaper Zéro.

== Éditions du Square ==
It was at Zéro that he met François Cavanna and Fred, with whom he founded the magazine Hara Kiri in 1960. After an initial ban, production of the magazine moved from Rue Choron to Rue de Montholon and Éditions du Square was created at its publication house.

In addition to his role of patron of Éditions du Square, Bernier also invested time in writing and photo-editing for Hara Kiri. It was during this era that he appeared on Jean-Christophe Averty's television variety show Les Raisins verts.

In 1969 the Hara Kiri team created Hara-Kiri Hebdo which shortly thereafter was renamed L’Hebdo Hara-Kiri. Other magazines published by Bernier's Editions du Square were the monthly comic Charlie Mensuel, one of the first ecological journals La Gueule ouverte, Mords-y l'œil, Surprise from designer Bernard Willem Holtrop, and Jean-Patrick Manchette's BD, l'hebdo de la BD.

1970 saw the creation of Charlie Hebdo, a weekly political newspaper for which Bernier was a regular contributor. The publication folded in 1981, but was relaunched by Cavanna in 1993 and, as of 2011, remains in publication.

== Later years ==
In 1988 Bernier adapted his fiches bricolages for television. He also participated in Jean-Michel Ribes' Merci Bernard. His last publications include La Mouise and Grodada, a publication for children. He also participated in several publications affiliated with Hara-Kiri, including ZOO and Yeti, as well as the launching of the periodical Zero in 1986.

In 1996, Aure Atika's interview of Jackie Berroyer for Radio Nova, at a bar's round table, degenerated into an angry exchange of words between Choron, who was sitting at the table, and Atika, with Choron denouncing her questions as "stupid" and Atika flinging the contents of her glass at him.

== Personal life ==
Grave of Professeur Choron in Montparnasse Cemetery

Bernier was the father of the comedian Michèle Bernier. He died 10 January 2005 at Necker-Enfants Malades Hospital in Paris and was buried at Montparnasse Cemetery alongside his wife Odile Vaudelle (1934–1985). In 2008, director Pierre Carles and artist Martin released the documentary Choron Dernière in his honour.

== Works ==
Albums

- Boum boum badaboum le Professeur Choron chante ses chansons

Books

- Les Jeux de con du professeur Choron, Éditions du Square, 1971
- Les Fiches bricolage du professeur Choron, Éditions du Square, 1977
- L'Art vulgaire (with Gébé), Éditions du Square, 1982
- Moi, Odile, la femme a Choron; petite histoire de Hara-Kiri et Charlie Hebdo (by Christian Bobet), Editions Menges, 1983
- Les Chansons du Professeur Choron (illustrated by Philippe Vuillemin), Himalaya, 1991
- Choron et Vuillemin sexologues, Magic Strip, 1992
- Je bois, je fume et je vous emmerde, ed. Régine Deforges, 1992
- Les Jeux de con du Professeur Choron, Glénat, 1992
- Vous me croirez si vous voulez (in collaboration with Jean-Marie Gourio), Flammarion, 1993
- Y'a rien de pire que l'ignorance (in collaboration with Philippe Vuillemin), Canal+ edition, 1996
- Tout s'éclaire (in collaboration with Éric Martin), Le Dilettante, 2001 ISBN 2-84263-044-0

Operettas

- Ivre-mort pour la patrie (with Philippe Vuillemin), Canal+, 1998
