= François Béranger =

French singer

- Born: August 28, 1937; Amilly, Loriet, France
- Died: October 14, 2003 (aged 66)
- Occupation: Singer

François Béranger (French pronunciation: [fʁɑ̃swa beʁɑ̃ʒe]; August 28, 1937, Amilly, Loiret – October 14, 2003) was a French singer and left libertarian.

== Life and career ==
Béranger was born in Amilly, Loriet, and was the oldest of 4 children. His mother, Jeanne was a seamstress and his father, André was a member of parliament for the Popular Republican Movement. Later, André was demobilized, and the family moved to a private mansion in Boulonge. Béranger began making music in the 1960s, influenced by realistic music and working-class culture. He took part in the revolts of May 68, and wrote protest songs such as L'alternative, Participe Présent, Rachel, and Tranche de Vie. Béranger's body was buried at the Juvénal cemetery in Castelnau-le-Lez.

== Selected filmography ==
- 1973 : L'An 01
