= Gébé =

French comics artist (1929–2004)

Georges Blondeaux (9 July 1929 – 4 April 2004), known as Gébé, was a French cartoonist.

Gébé began his career as an industrial designer at the SNCF in 1947, and published his first cartoons in La Vie du Rail magazine. In the 1960s he became known in major magazines such as Paris Match or Le Journal du dimanche. In 1969, he became editor-in-chief of Hara-Kiri, a magazine founded by François Cavanna and Georges Bernier (alias Professeur Choron) then Charlie Hebdo until 1985. He created photo novels photographed by Chenz. In 1986, he became editor-in-chief of Zéro. From 1992 to the end of his life, he was an active contributor to Charlie Hebdo magazine, of which he was publishing director.
