= Bernard Willem Holtrop =

Dutch cartoonist

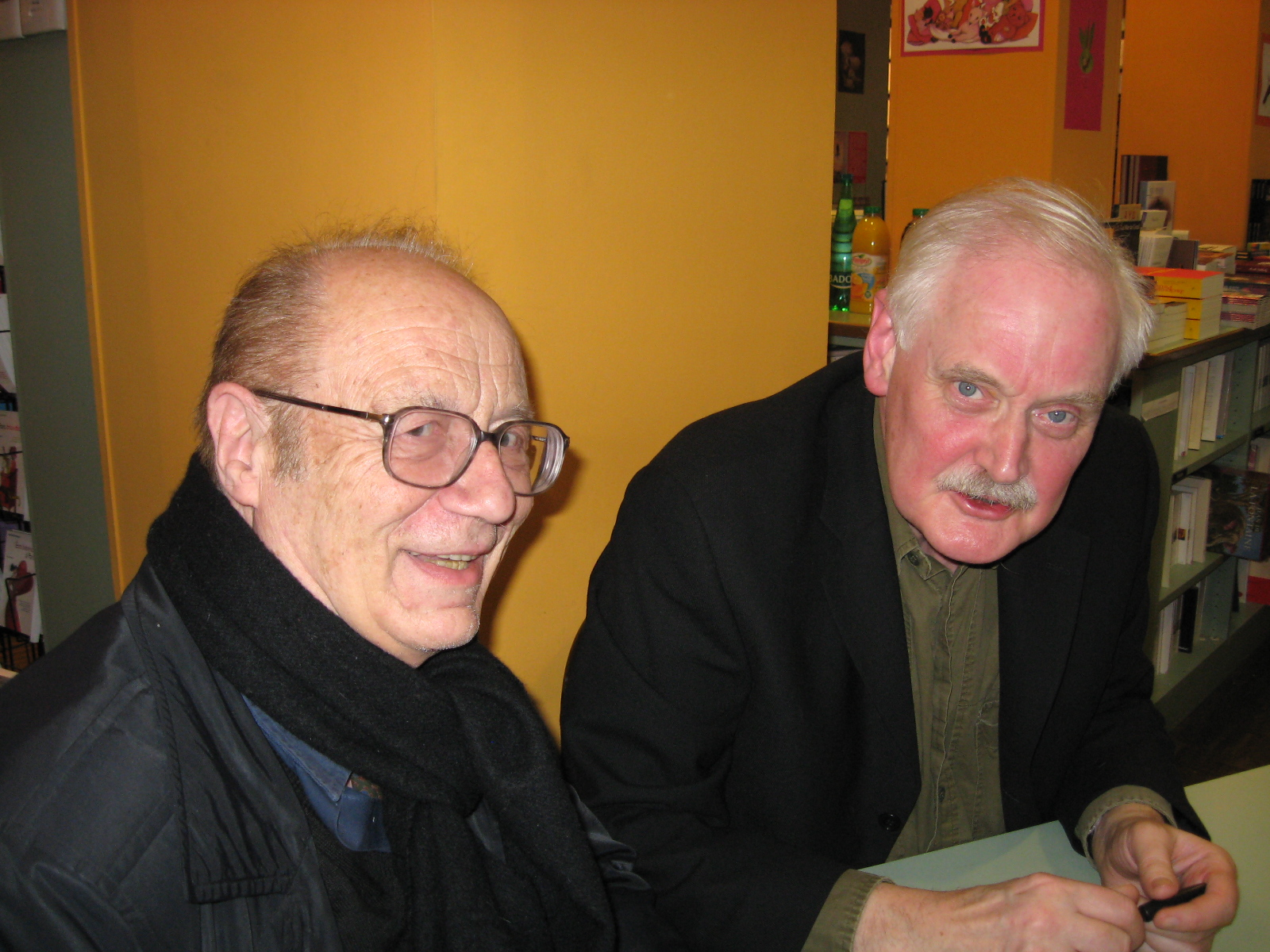
Willem (right) with Pierre Bourgeade, 2008

Bernard Willem Holtrop (born 2 April 1941, Ermelo) is a Dutch cartoonist living in France since 1968, who publishes under the pen name Willem. He is renowned for his sometimes provocative cartoons featuring violent and sexual imagery on political topics. In 1968 two of his cartoons led to court cases, where he was, among others, accused of lèse-majesté for depicting queen Juliana of The Netherlands as a prostitute. In the end he was only sentenced for a cartoon criticizing police brutality by comparing it with Nazism. The events motivated Willem to move to France, where he still lives to this day. His work attacks religion, the monarchy, the far-right, the far-left, terrorism and war policies.

He is the winner of the 2000 Stripschapprijs and of the 2013 Grand Prix de la ville d'Angoulême.

Willem has drawn in many newspapers: L'Enragé, Hara-Kiri, Charlie Hebdo, Charlie Mensuel, Libération, Siné Mensuel.
