= The Mystery of Alexina =

1985 film

- Film poster
- Directed by: René Féret
- Written by: René Féret; Jean Gruault; Herculine Barbin (based on memoir by)
- Produced by: René Féret; Marc Thiébault
- Starring: Philippe Vuillemin
- Cinematography: Bernard Zitzermann
- Edited by: Ariane Boeglin
- Music by: Anne-Marie Deschamps
- Distributed by: F. Distribution Associée
- Release date: 10 January 1985
- Running time: 86 minutes
- Country: France
- Language: French

The Mystery of Alexina (French: Le Mystère Alexina), also titled Alexina, is a 1985 French historical drama directed by René Féret and centered upon the intersex memoirist Herculine Barbin. It was screened in the Un Certain Regard section at the 1985 Cannes Film Festival.

== Cast ==
- Philippe Vuillemin as Alexina Barbin / Camille Barbin
- Valérie Stroh as Sara
- Véronique Silver as Madame Avril
- Bernard Freyd as Armand
- Marianne Basler as Marie Avril
- Pierre Vial as Priest
- Philippe Clévenot as Doctor Chesnet
- Isabelle Gruault as Josephine
- Lucienne Hamon as Hotel manager
- Claude Bouchery sa School inspector
- Olivier Sabran as Doctor
- Michel Amphoux as Hotel manager
- Anne Cornaly as Alexina's mother
- Vincent Pinel as Doctor
