= List of feature films with gay characters: 2000s =

Symbol for male homosexuality

The following is a list of feature films with fictional and factual gay characters. The films were released theatrically, direct-to-video, or on a streaming platform (OTT network).

Films are in alphabetical order by year of release. Titles beginning with determiners "A", "An", and "The" are alphabetized by the first significant word.

== 2000–2004 ==
List
Year	Title	Character(s)	Actor	Notes	Country	Ref(s)
2000	American Psycho	Luis Carruthers	Matt Ross	Carruthers is a colleague of Bateman and closeted homosexual	United States	
2000	Before Night Falls	Reinaldo Arenas	Javier Bardem	Reinaldo is imprisoned in Cuba for his homosexuality and later moves to New York City, where he contracts HIV/AIDS. He begins friendships with two other men, Pepe and Tomas. José is a literature writer. Virgilio is an influential writer. Pepe is in a relationship with Reinaldo before leaving him to pursue a woman.	United States	
2000	Before Night Falls	José Lezama Lima	Manuel González	Reinaldo is imprisoned in Cuba for his homosexuality and later moves to New York City, where he contracts HIV/AIDS. He begins friendships with two other men, Pepe and Tomas. José is a literature writer. Virgilio is an influential writer. Pepe is in a relationship with Reinaldo before leaving him to pursue a woman.	United States	
2000	Before Night Falls	Tomas Diego	Santiago Magill	Reinaldo is imprisoned in Cuba for his homosexuality and later moves to New York City, where he contracts HIV/AIDS. He begins friendships with two other men, Pepe and Tomas. José is a literature writer. Virgilio is an influential writer. Pepe is in a relationship with Reinaldo before leaving him to pursue a woman.	United States	
2000	Before Night Falls	Virgilio Piñera	Héctor Babenco	Reinaldo is imprisoned in Cuba for his homosexuality and later moves to New York City, where he contracts HIV/AIDS. He begins friendships with two other men, Pepe and Tomas. José is a literature writer. Virgilio is an influential writer. Pepe is in a relationship with Reinaldo before leaving him to pursue a woman.	United States	
2000	Best in Show	Scott Donlan	John Michael Higgins	Donlan and Vanderhoof are a campy couple who take great pride in their Shih Tzu Miss Agnes	United States	
2000	Best in Show	Stefan Vanderhoof	Michael McKean	Donlan and Vanderhoof are a campy couple who take great pride in their Shih Tzu Miss Agnes	United States	
2000	Billy Elliot	Michael Caffrey cross-dresser	Stuart Wells (young Michael); Merryn Owen (adult Michael)	Michael is a young boy and the best friend of Billy Elliot. At some point, Michael is seen using a dress and makeup. He shows interest in Billy, who does not reciprocate but is supportive of his friend.	United Kingdom	
2000	Borstal Boy	Charlie Milwall	Danny Dyer	Charlie is a young Irish sailor in 1941.	United Kingdom, Ireland	
2000	Bounce	Seth	Johnny Galecki	Seth is Buddy's secretary.	United States	
2000	Bring It On	Les	Huntley Ritter	Les is a member of the Toros cheerleading team.	United States	
2000	The Broken Hearts Club	Benji	Zach Braff	The film follows the lives of a group of friends in West Hollywood.	United States	
2000	The Broken Hearts Club	Cole	Dean Cain	The film follows the lives of a group of friends in West Hollywood.	United States	
2000	The Broken Hearts Club	Dennis	Timothy Olyphant	The film follows the lives of a group of friends in West Hollywood.	United States	
2000	The Broken Hearts Club	Howie	Matt McGrath	The film follows the lives of a group of friends in West Hollywood.	United States	
2000	The Broken Hearts Club	Kevin	Andrew Keegan	The film follows the lives of a group of friends in West Hollywood.	United States	
2000	The Broken Hearts Club	Marshall	Justin Theroux	The film follows the lives of a group of friends in West Hollywood.	United States	
2000	The Broken Hearts Club	Patrick	Ben Weber	The film follows the lives of a group of friends in West Hollywood.	United States	
2000	The Broken Hearts Club	Taylor	Billy Porter	The film follows the lives of a group of friends in West Hollywood.	United States	
2000	Chuck & Buck	Buck O'Brien	Mike White	Buck O'Brien is a 27-year-old amateur playwright with the maturity level of an adolescent.	United States	
2000	Drôle de Félix	Félix	Sami Bouajila	Félix is gay man of Arab descent who decides to hitchhike from Dieppe to Marseille to search his father.	France	
2000	Finding Forrester	William Forrester	Sean Connery	Forrester is a reclusive writer who James befriends.	United States	
2000	Lavender	Chow Chow	Eason Chan	Chow Chow is Athena's nosy next door neighbor.	Hong Kong	
2000	The Next Best Thing	Robert Whittaker	Rupert Everett	Robert is Abbie's best friend, who she decides to have a child with.	United States	
2000	O Fantasma	Sérgio	Ricardo Meneses	Sérgio is a trash collector who becomes obsessed of the young man João, whom he stalks, kidnaps and rapes.	Portugal	
2000	Sexy Beast	Teddy Bass	Ian McShane	Bass is a London crime boss.	United Kingdom, Spain	
2000	Traffic	Francisco "Frankie Flowers" Flores	Clifton Collins Jr.	Flores is a sicario who works for the Obregón brothers.	United States	
2000	28 Days	Dutch Gerhardt	Alan Tudyk	Gerhardt is a patient in rehab and a dancer.	United States	
2000	Urbania	Charlie	Dan Futterman	Charlie is a troubled man searching for answers, and Chris is the mysterious person tied to his pain.	United States	
2000	Urbania	Chris	Matt Keeslar	Charlie is a troubled man searching for answers, and Chris is the mysterious person tied to his pain.	United States	
2000	Wonder Boys	James Leer	Tobey Maguire	Leer is one of Grady's students.	United States, United Kingdom, Germany, Japan	
2001	Blow	Derek Foreal	Paul Reubens	Foreal is a marijuana dealer.	United States	
2001	Bridget Jones's Diary	Tom	James Callis	Tom is Bridget Jones's gay best friend.	United Kingdom, United States	
2001	The Deep End	Beau Hall	Jonathan Tucker	Beau is a high school senior dating a 30-year-old club owner.	United States	
2001	Der Schuh des Manitu	Winnetouch	Michael Herbig	Winnetouch is the effeminate twin brother of Abahachi and owner of the all-pink Powder Rouge Ranch.	Germany	
2001	Gypsy 83	Clive Webb	Kett Turton	Clive is a young goth who joins his friend Gypsy on a road trip to see a Stevie Nicks tribute in New York City.	United States	
2001	Hedwig and the Angry Inch	Luther Robinson	Maurice Dean Wint	Robinson is an American soldier in East Germany.	United States	
2001	The Ignorant Fairies	Michele	Stefano Accorsi	Michele is the lover of Massimo, the dead husband of Antonia.	Italy	
2001	Josie and the Pussycats	Wyatt Frame	Alan Cumming	Wyatt is a record producer.	United States	
2001	Kissing Jessica Stein	Martin	Michael Mastro	Martin and Sebastian are Helen's friends.	United States	
2001	Kissing Jessica Stein	Sebastian	Carson Elrod	Martin and Sebastian are Helen's friends.	United States	
2001	Lan Yu	Lan Yu	Liu Ye	The story of an affair between a young man and a middle-aged man. Set in mainland China.	China, Hong Kong	
2001	Lan Yu	Chen Handong	Hu Jun	The story of an affair between a young man and a middle-aged man. Set in mainland China.	China, Hong Kong	
2001	Legally Blonde	Enrique Salvatore	Greg Serano	Salvatore is the pool boy and a lynchpin in Elle's defense case with fitness guru Brooke Windham.	United States	
2001	L.I.E.	Howie Blitzer	Paul Dano	Howie is discovering his sexual orientation. Gary is a hustler who becomes a friend of Howie. Big John is Gary's client and a pedophile.	United States	
2001	L.I.E.	Gary Terrio	Billy Kay	Howie is discovering his sexual orientation. Gary is a hustler who becomes a friend of Howie. Big John is Gary's client and a pedophile.	United States	
2001	L.I.E.	Big John Harrigan	Brian Cox	Howie is discovering his sexual orientation. Gary is a hustler who becomes a friend of Howie. Big John is Gary's client and a pedophile.	United States	
2001	The Man Who Wasn't There	Creighton Tolliver	Jon Polito	Tolliver is a businessman looking for investors to invest $10,000 in a new technology called dry cleaning in 1949 Santa Rosa, California.	United Kingdom, United States	
2001	The Mexican	Leroy	James Gandolfini	Leroy is a hitman.	United States	
2001	Saving Silverman	J.D McNugent	Jack Black	Judith helps J.D. realize his sexuality.	United States	
2001	The Score	Max	Marlon Brando	Max is a crook about to pull of the biggest job of his career.	United States	
2001	Shake It All About	Jørgen	Troels Lyby	Jacob asks Jørgen to marry him, and he happily accepts. However, Jacob falls in love with another woman.	Denmark	
2001	Wet Hot American Summer	McKinley	Michael Ian Black	McKinley and Ben are camp counselors and lovers.	United States	
2001	Wet Hot American Summer	Ben	Bradley Cooper	McKinley and Ben are camp counselors and lovers.	United States	
2002	Bend It Like Beckham	Tony	Ameet Chana	Tony is Jess's best friend.	United Kingdom, United States, Germany, India	
2002	Boat Trip	Lloyd Faversham	Roger Moore	Brian and Michael are boyfriends.	United States	
2002	Boat Trip	Brian	Artie Lange	Brian and Michael are boyfriends.	United States	
2002	Boat Trip	Michael	Will Ferrell	Brian and Michael are boyfriends.	United States	
2002	Dahmer	Jeffrey Dahmer	Jeremy Renner	The story of the real-life serial killer of the same name.	United States	
2002	Far from Heaven	Frank Whitaker	Dennis Quaid	Frank is an executive at Magnatech, a television advertising company and Cathy's husband. She walks in on him passionately kissing a man and he confesses to having had "problems" as a young man.	United States	
2002	Friday After Next	Damon Pearly	Terry Crews	Damon is a newly released ex-convict who developed homosexual tendencies in prison.	United States	
2002	The Hours	Richard Brown	Ed Harris	Richard is a moody poet and author living with AIDS.	United Kingdom, United States	
2002	Sweet Home Alabama	Bobby Ray	Ethan Embry	Bobby Ray is outed by his best friend.	United States	
2002	Unconditional Love	Dirk	Rupert Everett	Dirk is closeted singer Victor Fox 's former lover.	United States	
2002	Unconditional Love	Victor Fox	Jonathan Pryce	Dirk is closeted singer Victor Fox 's former lover.	United States	
2002	Wie die Karnickel	Siegfried "Siggi" Purzmann	Sven Walser	Siggi is the neighbour and friend of the protagonist Horst Bömmelburg and introduces him to a new and much more relaxed perspective on his sex drive.	Germany	
2003	American Wedding	Bear	Eric Allan Kramer	Bear is a balding shaggy lineman sort of guy who Kevin and Finch meet in the gay bar.	United States	
2003	Arisan!	Nino	Surya Saputra	The first Indonesian film to feature a same-sex kiss.	Indonesia	
2003	Arisan!	Sakti	Tora Sudiro	The first Indonesian film to feature a same-sex kiss.	Indonesia	
2003	Bright Young Things	Miles Maitland	Michael Sheen	Maitland is forced to flee the country to avoid prosecution for homosexuality.	United Kingdom	
2003	Latter Days	Christian Markelli	Wes Ramsey	Christian makes a bet with his friends that he can seduce a neighbor (Aaron) who is a Mormon missionary.	United States	
2003	Latter Days	Aaron Davis	Steve Sandvoss	Christian makes a bet with his friends that he can seduce a neighbor (Aaron) who is a Mormon missionary.	United States	
2003	Mambo Italiano	Angelo Barberini	Luke Kirby	Angelo is the son of Italian immigrants. Nino is his boyfriend, who is not out to his parents.	Canada	
2003	Mambo Italiano	Nino Paventi	Peter Miller	Angelo is the son of Italian immigrants. Nino is his boyfriend, who is not out to his parents.	Canada	
2003	Party Monster	Michael Alig	Macaulay Culkin	Based on Disco Bloodbath, the memoir of James St. James which details his friendship with Alig, an infamous New York City party promoter, that later fell apart as Alig's drug addiction worsened, and ended after he murdered Andre "Angel" Melendez and went to prison.	United States	
2003	Party Monster	James St. James	Seth Green	Based on Disco Bloodbath, the memoir of James St. James which details his friendship with Alig, an infamous New York City party promoter, that later fell apart as Alig's drug addiction worsened, and ended after he murdered Andre "Angel" Melendez and went to prison.	United States	
2004	The 24th Day	Dan	James Marsden	Tom has been diagnosed with HIV and believes he infected his late wife with the AIDS virus. He had only one sexual encounter with a man, Dan, and thinks that it was he who transmitted the disease to him. Tom kidnaps Dan with the intent to kill him.	United States	
2004	Alexander	Hephaistion	Jared Leto	Alexander has relationships with childhood friends Hephaistion and Bagoas.	Germany, France, Italy, Netherlands, United Kingdom, United States	
2004	Alexander	Bagoas	Francisco Bosch	Alexander has relationships with childhood friends Hephaistion and Bagoas.	Germany, France, Italy, Netherlands, United Kingdom, United States	
2004	Bad Education	Enrique Goded	Fele Martínez	Focusing on two reunited childhood friends and lovers caught up in a stylized murder mystery.	Spain	
2004	Bad Education	Father Manolo	Daniel Giménez Cacho	Focusing on two reunited childhood friends and lovers caught up in a stylized murder mystery.	Spain	
2004	Bad Education	Ignacio Rodriguez	Francisco Boira	Focusing on two reunited childhood friends and lovers caught up in a stylized murder mystery.	Spain	
2004	Brother to Brother	Perry	Anthony Mackie	Black art student Perry is thrown out by his parents for his homosexuality and is further disturbed by a potential romantic entanglement with a white boy in his class.	United States	
2004	Enter the Phoenix	Georgie Hung Chi Kit	Daniel Wu	Georgie lives as a cook with his boyfriend Frankie, is uninterested to continue his father's work.	Hong Kong	
2004	Formula 17	Chou T'ien Tsai	Tony Yang	Chou is looking for romance as he takes a trip to the capital, Taipei, to visit an online boyfriend in person for the first time. Disappointed to find that his online friend only wants sex and has no interest in forming a romantic bond, he starts to look elsewhere, finding his internet relationship. T'ien's roommate and friends help him look for the man of his dreams. The film was banned in Singapore because it "portrays homosexuality as normal, and a natural progression of society".	Taiwan	
2004	Formula 17	Bai Tieh Nan/Richard Bai	Duncan Lai	Chou is looking for romance as he takes a trip to the capital, Taipei, to visit an online boyfriend in person for the first time. Disappointed to find that his online friend only wants sex and has no interest in forming a romantic bond, he starts to look elsewhere, finding his internet relationship. T'ien's roommate and friends help him look for the man of his dreams. The film was banned in Singapore because it "portrays homosexuality as normal, and a natural progression of society".	Taiwan	
2004	Formula 17	Yu	King Chin	Chou is looking for romance as he takes a trip to the capital, Taipei, to visit an online boyfriend in person for the first time. Disappointed to find that his online friend only wants sex and has no interest in forming a romantic bond, he starts to look elsewhere, finding his internet relationship. T'ien's roommate and friends help him look for the man of his dreams. The film was banned in Singapore because it "portrays homosexuality as normal, and a natural progression of society".	Taiwan	
2004	Formula 17	Jun	Jason Chang	Chou is looking for romance as he takes a trip to the capital, Taipei, to visit an online boyfriend in person for the first time. Disappointed to find that his online friend only wants sex and has no interest in forming a romantic bond, he starts to look elsewhere, finding his internet relationship. T'ien's roommate and friends help him look for the man of his dreams. The film was banned in Singapore because it "portrays homosexuality as normal, and a natural progression of society".	Taiwan	
2004	Formula 17	C.C.	Dada Ji	Chou is looking for romance as he takes a trip to the capital, Taipei, to visit an online boyfriend in person for the first time. Disappointed to find that his online friend only wants sex and has no interest in forming a romantic bond, he starts to look elsewhere, finding his internet relationship. T'ien's roommate and friends help him look for the man of his dreams. The film was banned in Singapore because it "portrays homosexuality as normal, and a natural progression of society".	Taiwan	
2004	Formula 17	Alan	James Yun	Chou is looking for romance as he takes a trip to the capital, Taipei, to visit an online boyfriend in person for the first time. Disappointed to find that his online friend only wants sex and has no interest in forming a romantic bond, he starts to look elsewhere, finding his internet relationship. T'ien's roommate and friends help him look for the man of his dreams. The film was banned in Singapore because it "portrays homosexuality as normal, and a natural progression of society".	Taiwan	
2004	Formula 17	Ray	Jeff Locker	Chou is looking for romance as he takes a trip to the capital, Taipei, to visit an online boyfriend in person for the first time. Disappointed to find that his online friend only wants sex and has no interest in forming a romantic bond, he starts to look elsewhere, finding his internet relationship. T'ien's roommate and friends help him look for the man of his dreams. The film was banned in Singapore because it "portrays homosexuality as normal, and a natural progression of society".	Taiwan	
2004	Formula 17	Kevin	Ladder Yu	Chou is looking for romance as he takes a trip to the capital, Taipei, to visit an online boyfriend in person for the first time. Disappointed to find that his online friend only wants sex and has no interest in forming a romantic bond, he starts to look elsewhere, finding his internet relationship. T'ien's roommate and friends help him look for the man of his dreams. The film was banned in Singapore because it "portrays homosexuality as normal, and a natural progression of society".	Taiwan	
2004	Hellbent	Joey	Hank Harris	Joey is one of Eddie's friends.	United States	
2004	A Home at the End of the World	Jonathan Glover	Harris Allan / Dallas Roberts	Bobby finds a new home with his childhood friend Jonathan. The two boys come of age together and discover their sexuality.	United States	
2004	A Home at the End of the World	Bobby Morrow	Colin Farrell	Bobby finds a new home with his childhood friend Jonathan. The two boys come of age together and discover their sexuality.	United States	
2004	Leave Me Alone	Yiu Chun Man	Ekin Cheng	Yiu is a fashion designer who has a boyfriend.	Hong Kong	
2004	Leave Me Alone	Man's boyfriend	Jan Lamb	Yiu is a fashion designer who has a boyfriend.	Hong Kong	
2004	Mean Girls	Damian Leigh	Daniel Franzese	Leigh is Janis and Cady' friend.	United States	
2004	Mysterious Skin	Neil McCormick	Joseph Gordon-Levitt	Neil is the son of an irresponsible single mother who is already discovering his own homosexuality. He is sexually abused by the Little League baseball coach.	Netherlands, United States	
2004	Rice Rhapsody	Daniel	Alvin Chiang	Daniel and Harry are the sons of Jen Fan, owner of a successful restaurant in Singapore's Chinatown.	Hong Kong, Singapore	
2004	Rice Rhapsody	Harry	Craig Toh	Daniel and Harry are the sons of Jen Fan, owner of a successful restaurant in Singapore's Chinatown.	Hong Kong, Singapore	
2004	Saved!	Dean	Chad Faust	Dean is sent away by his parents to be "degayified". Mitch is Dean's boyfriend.	United States	
2004	Saved!	Mitch	Kett Turton	Dean is sent away by his parents to be "degayified". Mitch is Dean's boyfriend.	United States	
2004	Somersault	Richard	Erik Thomson	Richard is a neighbour who is in town for a few days clearing out his relative's house before it goes to auction.	Australia	
2004	Stage Beauty	George Villiers	Ben Chaplin	Villiers, the Duke of Buckingham, is the lover of Kynaston.	Germany, United Kingdom, United States	
2004	The Stepford Wives	Roger Bannister	Roger Bart	Roger and his long-time partner Jerry are residents of Stepford.	United States	
2004	The Stepford Wives	Jerry Harmon	David Marshall Grant	Roger and his long-time partner Jerry are residents of Stepford.	United States	
2004	Summer Storm	Tobi	Robert Stadlober	Tobi fells in love with his heterosexual childhood friend Achim.	Germany	
2004	Touch of Pink	Alim	Jimi Mistry	Alim and Giles are in an open relationship, but Alim is not out to his Muslim mother and family. When Alim's mother announces that she is going to be visiting him, he and Giles must pretend that they are only roommates, which begins to strain their relationship.	Canada, United Kingdom	
2004	Touch of Pink	Giles	Kris Holden-Ried	Alim and Giles are in an open relationship, but Alim is not out to his Muslim mother and family. When Alim's mother announces that she is going to be visiting him, he and Giles must pretend that they are only roommates, which begins to strain their relationship.	Canada, United Kingdom	
2004	Traumschiff Surprise – Periode 1	Jürgen T. Kork	Christian Tramitz	Parody of Star Trek with Jürgen T. Kork (i.e. James T. Kirk), Schrotty (i.e. Scotty) and Mr. Spuck (i.e. Spock) depicted as effeminate. The film was partly criticized by the gay scene because the homosexual protagonists are consistently portrayed as full of clichés.	Germany	
2004	Traumschiff Surprise – Periode 1	Mr. Spuck	Michael Herbig	Parody of Star Trek with Jürgen T. Kork (i.e. James T. Kirk), Schrotty (i.e. Scotty) and Mr. Spuck (i.e. Spock) depicted as effeminate. The film was partly criticized by the gay scene because the homosexual protagonists are consistently portrayed as full of clichés.	Germany	
2004	Traumschiff Surprise – Periode 1	Schrotty	Rick Kavanian	Parody of Star Trek with Jürgen T. Kork (i.e. James T. Kirk), Schrotty (i.e. Scotty) and Mr. Spuck (i.e. Spock) depicted as effeminate. The film was partly criticized by the gay scene because the homosexual protagonists are consistently portrayed as full of clichés.	Germany	

== 2005–2009 ==
List
Year	Title	Character(s)	Actor	Notes	Country	Ref(s)
2005	Be Cool	Elliot Wilhelm	Dwayne Johnson	Elliot is Raji's Samoan bodyguard.	United States	
2005	The Blossoming of Maximo Oliveros	Maximo "Maxi" Oliveros	Nathan Lopez	Oliveros is a teenage effeminate boy who becomes infatuated with a police officer who rescued him from harassment.	Philippines	
2005	Brokeback Mountain	Randall Malone	David Harbour	Randall has an affair with Jack.	United States	
2005	Capote	Truman Capote	Philip Seymour Hoffman	Following the events during the writing of Capote's book In Cold Blood.	United States, Canada	
2005	Capote	Jack Dunphy	Bruce Greenwood	Following the events during the writing of Capote's book In Cold Blood.	United States, Canada	
2005	The Constant Gardener	Arnold Bluhm	Hubert Koundé	Arnold Bluhm is a Belgian doctor who Tessa befriends during her husband's posting in Kenya, and keeps his homosexuality a secret.	United Kingdom, Germany	
2005	C.R.A.Z.Y.	Zachary Beaulieu	Marc-André Grondin	Zac is a young man dealing with homophobia whike growing up with his four brothers and his father in Quebec during the 1960s and 1970s.	Canada	
2005	Cursed	Bo	Milo Ventimiglia	Bo is a wrestler repressing his sexuality.	United States	
2005	The Dying Gaul	Robert Sandrich	Peter Sarsgaard	In 1995 Hollywood, novice screenwriter Sandrich has written an autobiographical script inspired by his lover's death by AIDS-related cerebral tuberculosis.	United States	
2005	The Family Stone	Thad Stone	Tyrone Giordano	Thad is deaf and is the youngest son in the Stone family. He and his partner, Patrick, have an adopted son.	United States	
2005	The Family Stone	Patrick Thomas	Brian J. White	Thad is deaf and is the youngest son in the Stone family. He and his partner, Patrick, have an adopted son.	United States	
2005	Happy Endings	Charley Peppitone	Steve Coogan	Charlie runs a restaurant. Gil is his partner.	United States	
2005	Happy Endings	Gil Palmer	David Sutcliffe	Charlie runs a restaurant. Gil is his partner.	United States	
2005	Kinky Boots	Simon / Lola	Chiwetel Ejiofor	A man who is a drag queen performer, with Simon as his alter ego.	United Kingdom	
2005	Kiss Kiss Bang Bang	Perry Van Shrike/"Gay Perry"	Val Kilmer	Perry is a detective.	United States	
2005	Little Fish	Lionel Dawson	Hugo Weaving	Rugby star Dawson is the former lover of 'The Jockey', a local gangster on the point of retirement.	Australia	
2005	Loggerheads	George	Michael Kelly	George is a friendly motel owner who offers Mark, a young man obsessed with loggerhead sea turtles, to stay.	United States	
2005	Loggerheads	Mark	Kip Pardue	George is a friendly motel owner who offers Mark, a young man obsessed with loggerhead sea turtles, to stay.	United States	
2005	Monster-in-Law	Remy	Adam Scott	Remy is Charlie's neighbor and best friend.	United States	
2005	My Fair Son	Ray	Junrui Wang	Ray falls in love with one of his father's colleagues.	China	
2005	My Fair Son	Unnamed student	Guifeng Wang	Ray falls in love with one of his father's colleagues.	China	
2005	Rent	Thomas B. "Tom" Collins	Jesse L. Martin	"Tom" Collins is an anarchist and philosophy professor with AIDS. Schunard is a drag queen and street musician who is also suffering from AIDS.	United States	
2005	Rent	Angel Dumott Schunard	Wilson Jermaine Heredia	"Tom" Collins is an anarchist and philosophy professor with AIDS. Schunard is a drag queen and street musician who is also suffering from AIDS.	United States	
2005	Strangers with Candy	Chuck Noblet	Stephen Colbert	Chuck and Geoffrey are high school teachers.	United States	
2005	Strangers with Candy	Geoffrey Jellineck	Paul Dinello	Chuck and Geoffrey are high school teachers.	United States	
2005	Tides of War	Frank Habley	Adrian Paul	Cmdr. Habley and Lt. Cmdr. Palatonio (Frank's executive officer) are partners serving on the same submarine. Tom is killed in a battle and Frank must continue to serve on the same vessel. Released in theaters as Phantom Below with the gay theme excluded. The original gay version was broadcast by the Here network.	United States	
2005	Tides of War	Tom Palatonio	Mike Doyle	Cmdr. Habley and Lt. Cmdr. Palatonio (Frank's executive officer) are partners serving on the same submarine. Tom is killed in a battle and Frank must continue to serve on the same vessel. Released in theaters as Phantom Below with the gay theme excluded. The original gay version was broadcast by the Here network.	United States	
2005	V for Vendetta	Gordon Deitrich	Stephen Fry	Deitrich is Evey's former boss and a talk show host.	Germany, United Kingdom, United States	
2005	Wedding Crashers	Todd Cleary	Keir O'Donnell	Todd is the hunchbacked brother of Claire who aggressively comes on to Jeremy. A GQ review described the character as an inexcusably unfunny riff on the old "predatory gay man" trope.	United States	
2006	Another Gay Movie	Griff	Mitch Morris	Following four friends, Andy, Jarod, Nico and Griff, who vow upon graduating high school that they will all lose their "anal virginity" before their friend's Labor Day party.	United States	
2006	Another Gay Movie	Nico Hunter	Jonah Blechman	Following four friends, Andy, Jarod, Nico and Griff, who vow upon graduating high school that they will all lose their "anal virginity" before their friend's Labor Day party.	United States	
2006	Another Gay Movie	Jarod	Jonathan Chase	Following four friends, Andy, Jarod, Nico and Griff, who vow upon graduating high school that they will all lose their "anal virginity" before their friend's Labor Day party.	United States	
2006	Another Gay Movie	Andy Wilson	Michael Carbonaro	Following four friends, Andy, Jarod, Nico and Griff, who vow upon graduating high school that they will all lose their "anal virginity" before their friend's Labor Day party.	United States	
2006	The Architect	Shawn	Paul James	Martin is a college dropout who explores his sexuality with a young man named Shawn.	United States	
2006	The Architect	Martin Waters	Sebastian Stan	Martin is a college dropout who explores his sexuality with a young man named Shawn.	United States	
2006	Boy Culture	Alex "X"	Derek Magyar	Identical to the novel's plot, the film follows a man who goes by only the letter "X" to maintain his anonymity and relationships between his two roommates—one of whom he's in love with	United States	
2006	Boy Culture	Andrew	Darryl Stephens	Identical to the novel's plot, the film follows a man who goes by only the letter "X" to maintain his anonymity and relationships between his two roommates—one of whom he's in love with	United States	
2006	Boy Culture	Joey	Jonathon Trent	Identical to the novel's plot, the film follows a man who goes by only the letter "X" to maintain his anonymity and relationships between his two roommates—one of whom he's in love with	United States	
2006	Boy Culture	Gregory Talbot	Patrick Bauchau	Identical to the novel's plot, the film follows a man who goes by only the letter "X" to maintain his anonymity and relationships between his two roommates—one of whom he's in love with	United States	
2006	The Bubble	Ashraf	Yousef 'Joe' Sweid	Retelling the story of two men who fall in love, one Israeli and one Palestinian.	Israel	
2006	The Bubble	Noam	Ohad Knoller	Retelling the story of two men who fall in love, one Israeli and one Palestinian.	Israel	
2006	The Bubble	Yali	Alon Friedman	Retelling the story of two men who fall in love, one Israeli and one Palestinian.	Israel	
2006	Confetti	Archie	Vincent Franklin	Archie and Gregory are wedding planners and partners in both business and love.	United Kingdom	
2006	Confetti	Gregory	Jason Watkins	Archie and Gregory are wedding planners and partners in both business and love.	United Kingdom	
2006	Crank	Kaylo	Efren Ramirez	Kaylo is Chev Chelios' informant.	United States	
2006	Eternal Summer	Jonathan	Bryant Chang	Jonathan, a studious schoolboy, is asked by his teacher to look after another boy, Shane, who is rebellious and dislikes learning. Ten years on, they have developed a good friendship despite their divergent lives: Jonathan on course to go to university and Shane to become a basketball player. Jonathan is also attracted to Shane, but the attraction is not reciprocated. However, the young men's fates change when a girl, Carrie, has a secret affair with Shane (who is determined to keep it secret in order to protect Jonathan's feelings) and also does her best to persuade Shane to abandon basketball and instead work hard to try to enter university.	Taiwan	
2006	The History Boys	Douglas Hector	Richard Griffiths	Based on the play of the same name.	United Kingdom	
2006	The History Boys	Tom Irwin	Stephen Campbell Moore	Based on the play of the same name.	United Kingdom	
2006	The History Boys	David Posner	Samuel Barnett	Based on the play of the same name.	United Kingdom	
2006	Infamous	Truman Capote	Toby Jones	The time of author Capote's life during which he researched and wrote In Cold Blood.	United States	
2006	Let's Go to Prison	Barry	Chi McBride	Barry and Biederman eventually develop a romantic relationship in the movie's process.	United States	
2006	Let's Go to Prison	Nelson Biederman IV	Will Arnett	Barry and Biederman eventually develop a romantic relationship in the movie's process.	United States	
2006	Little Miss Sunshine	Frank Ginsberg	Steve Carell	Frank, an unemployed scholar of Proust, is temporarily living with his sister's family after having attempted suicide.	United States	
2006	The Night Listener	Gabriel Noone	Robin Williams	Gabriel is a popular New York City radio show host, is dealing with a separation from his partner, Jess.	United States	
2006	The Night Listener	Jess	Bobby Cannavale	Gabriel is a popular New York City radio show host, is dealing with a separation from his partner, Jess.	United States	
2006	No Regret	Lee Su-min	Lee Yeong-hoon	Jae-min is a former driving client of Su-min who falls in love with him.	South Korea	
2006	No Regret	Song Jae-min	Kim Nam-gil	Jae-min is a former driving client of Su-min who falls in love with him.	South Korea	
2006	Poseidon	Richard Nelson	Richard Dreyfuss	Nelson is an architect and one of the survivors.	United States	
2006	Running with Scissors	Neil Bookman	Joseph Fiennes	Augusten and Neil begin an erratic sexual relationship.	United States	
2006	Running with Scissors	Augusten Burroughs	Joseph Cross	Augusten and Neil begin an erratic sexual relationship.	United States	
2006	Scenes of a Sexual Nature	Billy	Ewan McGregor	Billy and Brian are life-partners.	United Kingdom	
2006	Scenes of a Sexual Nature	Brian	Douglas Hodge	Billy and Brian are life-partners.	United Kingdom	
2006	Shortbus	James	Paul Dawson	James and Jamie are a couple. James wants to introduce other men into their relationship for sex.	Canada	
2006	Shortbus	Jamie	PJ DeBoy	James and Jamie are a couple. James wants to introduce other men into their relationship for sex.	Canada	
2006	Talladega Nights: The Ballad of Ricky Bobby	Jean Girard	Sacha Baron Cohen	Jean is a French Formula One driver and Bobby's archrival.	United States	
2006	United 93	Mark Bingham	Cheyenne Jackson	During the September 11 attacks in 2001, Mark was on board United Airlines Flight 93. He was among the passengers who formed the plan to retake the airplane from the hijackers, resulting in the plane crashing into a field near Shanksville, Pennsylvania, and thwarting the hijackers' plan to crash into a building in Washington, D.C. (most likely either the U.S. Capitol Building or the White House).	United States	
2007	Breakfast with Scot	Eric McNally	Tom Cavanagh	McNally is a retired hockey player turned television sportscaster who lives with his partner Sam, a sports lawyer.	Canada	
2007	Breakfast with Scot	Sam	Ben Shenkman	McNally is a retired hockey player turned television sportscaster who lives with his partner Sam, a sports lawyer.	Canada	
2007	Breakfast with Scot	Scot	Noah Bernett	McNally is a retired hockey player turned television sportscaster who lives with his partner Sam, a sports lawyer.	Canada	
2007	I Now Pronounce You Chuck & Larry	Fred Duncan	Ving Rhames	Duncan is a firefight who despite his intimidating appearance, is uncomfortable of disclosing his sexuality.	United States	
2007	Love Songs	Erwann	Grégoire Leprince-Ringuet	Ismaël, Julie, and Alice are in a ménage-à-trois. After a tragedy strikes and breaks them apart, the characters learn to deal with loss and mourning. Ismaël unexpectedly finds love again with a young man named Erwann.	France	
2007	Shelter	Shaun	Brad Rowe	Shaun is Gabe's older brother who develops a close relationship with Zack, his brother's best friend, and struggles with his sexuality.	United States	
2007	Stardust	Captain Shakespeare	Robert De Niro	Captain Shakespeare is a sky pirate.	United States, United Kingdom	
2007	The Walker	Carter Page III	Woody Harrelson	A middle-aged male escort living in Washington, D. C.	United States, United Kingdom	
2008	Brideshead Revisited	Anthony Blanche	Joseph Beattie	Flyte is the younger son of Lord and Lady Marchmain who forms a deep friendship with Ryder. Blanche is a friend of Flyter and Ryder's and an overt homosexual.	United Kingdom	
2008	Brideshead Revisited	Lord Sebastian Flyte	Ben Whishaw	Flyte is the younger son of Lord and Lady Marchmain who forms a deep friendship with Ryder. Blanche is a friend of Flyter and Ryder's and an overt homosexual.	United Kingdom	
2008	Brideshead Revisited	Charles Ryder	Matthew Goode	Flyte is the younger son of Lord and Lady Marchmain who forms a deep friendship with Ryder. Blanche is a friend of Flyter and Ryder's and an overt homosexual.	United Kingdom	
2008	Death Race	Joseph "Machine Gun Joe" Mason	Tyrese Gibson	Machine Gun Joe is a sociopathic racer who looks to use Death Race as a means to escape from prison.	United States	
2008	Doubt	Donald Miller	Joseph Foster	Miller is the first black student in a Catholic school in The Bronx who fears his homophobic father would kill him if he knew.	United States	
2008	Dream Boy	Nathan Davies	Stephan Bender	Following two teenagers falling in love in the rural South in the late 1970s.	United States	
2008	Dream Boy	Roy	Maximillian Roeg	Following two teenagers falling in love in the rural South in the late 1970s.	United States	
2008	Hamlet 2	Rand Posin	Skylar Astin	A drama student in love with his drama teacher.	United States	
2008	Little Ashes	Salvador Dalí	Robert Pattinson	An unconsummated sexual attraction between Dali and Lorca (whose homosexuality was known).	United Kingdom, Spain	
2008	Little Ashes	Federico García Lorca	Javier Beltrán	An unconsummated sexual attraction between Dali and Lorca (whose homosexuality was known).	United Kingdom, Spain	
2008	Mamma Mia!	Harry Bright	Colin Firth	Harry tells Donna: "You were the first woman I ever loved, and also the last."	Germany, United Kingdom, United States	
2008	Milk	Harvey Milk	Sean Penn	Milk was the first openly gay person to be elected to public office in California, as a member of the San Francisco Board of Supervisors. Smith and Lira are Milk's lovers.	United States	
2008	Milk	Cleve Jones	Emile Hirsch	Milk was the first openly gay person to be elected to public office in California, as a member of the San Francisco Board of Supervisors. Smith and Lira are Milk's lovers.	United States	
2008	Milk	Jack Lira	Diego Luna	Milk was the first openly gay person to be elected to public office in California, as a member of the San Francisco Board of Supervisors. Smith and Lira are Milk's lovers.	United States	
2008	Milk	Scott Smith	James Franco	Milk was the first openly gay person to be elected to public office in California, as a member of the San Francisco Board of Supervisors. Smith and Lira are Milk's lovers.	United States	
2008	Nick & Norah's Infinite Playlist	Beefy Guy (Lethario)	Jonathan B. Wright	Dev and Thom are Nick's bandmates. Beefy Guy is their new friend.	United States	
2008	Nick & Norah's Infinite Playlist	Dev	Rafi Gavron	Dev and Thom are Nick's bandmates. Beefy Guy is their new friend.	United States	
2008	Nick & Norah's Infinite Playlist	Thom	Aaron Yoo	Dev and Thom are Nick's bandmates. Beefy Guy is their new friend.	United States	
2008	Patrik, Age 1.5	Göran Skoogh	Gustaf Skarsgård	Göran and Sven are married couple who are anticipating the arrival of their adopted baby son. Upon arrival, they discover their son is actually 15-year-old juvenile delinquent, Patrik.	Sweden	
2008	Patrik, Age 1.5	Sven Skoogh	Torkel Petersson	Göran and Sven are married couple who are anticipating the arrival of their adopted baby son. Upon arrival, they discover their son is actually 15-year-old juvenile delinquent, Patrik.	Sweden	
2008	RocknRolla	Handsome Bob	Tom Hardy	Bob is a gangster.	United States, United Kingdom, France	
2008	Sex Drive	Rex Lafferty	James Marsden	At Thanksgiving dinner, Rex tells his family about his sexuality.	United States	
2008	Tropic Thunder	Alpa Chino	Brandon T. Jackson	Cino is a closeted rapper who is attempting to cross over into acting, portraying a soldier named Motown, while promoting his "Bust-A-Nut" candy bar and "Booty Sweat" energy drink.	United States, Germany, United Kingdom	
2008	Zack and Miri Make a Porno	Brandon St. Randy	Justin Long	Randy is Bobby's porn star boyfriend.	United States	
2009	44 Inch Chest	Meredith	Ian McShane	Meredith is a suave gambler.	United Kingdom	
2009	Brüno	Brüno Gehard	Sacha Baron Cohen	Gehard is a flamboyantly fashion reporter from Austria.	United States, United Kingdom	
2009	Cirque du Freak: The Vampire's Assistant	Mr. Tiny	Michael Cerveris	Mr. Tiny is a meddling trickster of immense magical power, responsible numerous creations.	United States	
2009	Horsemen	Corey Kurth	Patrick Fugit	Kurith is Taylor's brother.	United States	
2009	I Killed My Mother	Hubert Minel	Xavier Dolan	Following the complicated relationship between a young man and his mother.	Canada	
2009	I Love You, Man	Robbie Klaven	Andy Samberg	Robbie is Peter's brother.	United States	
2009	I Love You Phillip Morris	Phillip Morris	Ewan McGregor	While incarcerated, Steve falls in love with his fellow inmate, Morris.	France, United States	
2009	I Love You Phillip Morris	Steven Russell	Jim Carrey	While incarcerated, Steve falls in love with his fellow inmate, Morris.	France, United States	
2009	Permanent Residence	Ivan	Sean Li	Ivan seeks a long-term relationship with a straight friend. Befriending another young man, Windson, at a public sports club, the two build up a friendly rapport. However, Windson becomes aware of his inclination, and while happy to remain his friend, is initially very reluctant to become emotionally involved with him. This is the first feature film directed by award-winning Chinese LGBT filmmaker known as 'Scud'.	Hong Kong	
2009	Shank	Cal	Wayne Virgo	Cal is a 19-year-old closeted homosexual member and hooks up with Scott online before assaulting and abandoning him out in the countryside. Acting on his own attraction to Cal, Olivier seduces him and in doing so, exposes Cal to new emotions and a tenderness that he has never experienced before.	United Kingdom	
2009	Shank	Olivier	Marc Laurent	Cal is a 19-year-old closeted homosexual member and hooks up with Scott online before assaulting and abandoning him out in the countryside. Acting on his own attraction to Cal, Olivier seduces him and in doing so, exposes Cal to new emotions and a tenderness that he has never experienced before.	United Kingdom	
2009	Shank	Scott	Garry Summers	Cal is a 19-year-old closeted homosexual member and hooks up with Scott online before assaulting and abandoning him out in the countryside. Acting on his own attraction to Cal, Olivier seduces him and in doing so, exposes Cal to new emotions and a tenderness that he has never experienced before.	United Kingdom	
2009	Shank	Jonno	Tom Bott	Cal is a 19-year-old closeted homosexual member and hooks up with Scott online before assaulting and abandoning him out in the countryside. Acting on his own attraction to Cal, Olivier seduces him and in doing so, exposes Cal to new emotions and a tenderness that he has never experienced before.	United Kingdom	
2009	A Single Man	George Falconer	Colin Firth	In 1962, George dreams that he encounters the body of his longtime partner, Jim, at the scene of the car accident that took his life.	United States	
2009	A Single Man	Jim	Matthew Goode	In 1962, George dreams that he encounters the body of his longtime partner, Jim, at the scene of the car accident that took his life.	United States	
2009	Soundless Wind Chime	Ricky	Lu Yulai	An interracial love story, told through a linear narrative and a series of complex, interlocking flashbacks. Ricky, who has arrived in Hong Kong from mainland China, works as a delivery boy. He is robbed by a Swiss thief, Pascal, who admits his crime and returns the stolen item. The two eventually embark on a love affair, but through several flashbacks, it eventually becomes clear that Pascal has subsequently been killed in a road accident near their flat, which Ricky had witnessed. Some years later, Ricky visits Pascal's former home in Switzerland to find it abandoned. During his time there, he meets Pascal's doppelgänger in a man called Ueli, who nevertheless has a very different personality. They, too, fall in love and the contentment that Ricky finds enables him to reflect on the relationship he had with Pascal.	Hong Kong, Switzerland, China	
2009	Soundless Wind Chime	Pascal	Bernhard Bulling		Hong Kong, Switzerland, China	
2009	Soundless Wind Chime	Ueli	Bernhard Bulling		Hong Kong, Switzerland, China	
2009	Taking Woodstock	Elliot Teichberg/Tiber	Demetri Martin	Tiber volunteered his family's motel to be the home base for Woodstock concert organizers which would take place on a nearby farm.	United States	
2009	Undertow	Santiago	Manolo Cardona	Miguel is married to Mariela, who is pregnant with their first son, but he also has a secret affair with a male painter called Santiago.	Peru, Colombia, France, Germany	

== See also ==
- List of films featuring gay bathhouses
- List of gay characters in television
- List of LGBT-related films
- List of LGBT-related films by year
