= Georges Pichard =

French comics artist

- Born: 17 January 1920 Paris, France
- Died: 6 June 2003 (aged 83) Paris, France
- Areas: Artist, writer
- Notable works: Ténébrax; Submerman; Blanche Epiphanie; Paulette; Caroline Choléra; Ceux–là

Georges Pichard (French: [piʃaʁ]; 17 January 1920 – 6 June 2003) was a French comics artist, known for numerous magazine covers, serial publications and albums, stereotypically featuring voluptuous, partially exposed women.

== Biography ==
A page from Submerman, displayed in Centre Belge de la Bande Dessinée, Brussels.

A native of Paris, he was educated at the École nationale supérieure des arts appliqués et des métiers d'art, and after World War II worked as illustrator in advertising before publishing his first cartoon strip in La Semaine de Suzette in 1956, featuring a "girl next-door" character named Miss Mimi.

In the early 1960s he met Jacques Lob, with whom he collaborated on the superhero parodies Ténébrax and Submerman. Ténébrax was first published in the short-lived Franco-Belgian comics magazine Chouchou, and continued its serial run in Italian magazine Linus. In 1967, Submerman was serialised in Pilote magazine, but after a few years Pichard left the family friendly comics genre entirely.

Having collaborated with Danie Dubos on the more daring Lolly-strip which was serialised in Le Rire in 1966, Pichard and Lob began work within the erotic genre of comics as Blanche Épiphanie started serial publication in V Magazine in 1967. There was significant public reaction as this character acted outside the moral boundaries of the times, and at one point emulated Jane Fonda by going to Vietnam. This period saw Pichard develop his style of shaping his female heroines into tall, well-endowed women with excessive eyeliner make-up to create a gothic appearance.

Album issue of Ceux–là (1980) by Andrevon and Pichard, from 1977 Charlie Mensuel weekly publications.

Pichard continued to push the moral boundaries when he collaborated with Georges Wolinski to create a yet more controversial series featuring an eponymous character, Paulette, which began serial publication in Charlie Mensuel in 1970. This development became a target of right-wing politicians of that period, Jean Royer and Michel Debré. Continuing in this genre, Pichard reunited with Danie Dubos to produce Caroline Choléra which was serialised in L'Écho des savanes in 1975. Upon the publication in 1977 of Marie-Gabrielle de Saint-Eutrope, a work almost entirely devoted to sexualized sadism, the explicit nature of Pichard's work led to a ban from bookshops and kiosks.

Less scrutinized for its erotic emphasis are the collaborations Pichard did with science-fiction author Jean-Pierre Andrevon, La Reserve and Édouard from 1974 and Ceux–là from 1977, published in Charlie Mensuel.

Toward the end of his life, Pichard adapted classic erotic stories such as Les Exploits d'un jeune Don Juan by Guillaume Apollinaire, The Kama-Sutra by Vatsyayana, Trois filles de leur mère by Pierre Louÿs, La Religieuse by Denis Diderot and Germinal by Émile Zola.

== Bibliography ==
Title	Year	Vol.	Editor	Remarks
Ténébrax	1963		Serg	written by Jacques Lob
Submerman	1967	6	Glénat	written by Jacques Lob
Lolly-strip	1972		Losfeld	written by Danie Dubos
Blanche Epiphanie	1972	6	Serg/Dargaud	written by Jacques Lob
Paulette	1971	7	Le Square/Dargaud	written by Georges Wolinski
Ulysse	1974	2	Dargaud	written by Jacques Lob
James du Tiers Bond -Ah! ça ira Sahara	1975		ABC	written by Françoise Prévost
Caroline Choléra	1975	2	Editions du Fromage	written by Danie Dubos
Marie-Gabrielle de Saint-Eutrope	1977	2	Glénat	
Édouard + La Réserve	1978		Le Square	written by Jean-Pierre Andrevon
L'usine	1979	2	Glénat	
Ceux–là	1980	2	Le Square	written by Jean-Pierre Andrevon
Les manufacturées	1980		Le Square	written by Faraldo
Carmen	1981		Albin Michel	written by Prosper Mérimée
Bornéo Jo	1983	2	Albin Michel	written by Danie Dubos
La Comtesse rouge	1985		Editions Dominique Leroy	written by Léopold Sacher-Masoch
Les Sorcières de Thessalie	1985	2	Glénat	written by Apuleius
La fleur de lotus	1987		Albin Michel	from Jin Ping Mei
Marlène et Jupiter	1988		Yes Company	
Madoline	1990	2	CAP	
Les Exploits d'un Don Juan	1991		Albin Michel	written by Guillaume Apollinaire
Le Kama Soutra	1991		Curiosa	written by Vatsyayana
Trois filles de leur mère	1992		Curiosa	written by Pierre Louÿs
La voie du repentir	1992		CAP	
La religieuse	1992		Création Art Presse	written by Denis Diderot
Germinal	1992		Magic Strip	written by Émile Zola
La perfection chrétienne	2013		Glénat	

== Sources ==
- Georges Pichard publications in Pilote, Charlie Mensuel, L'Écho des Savanes and Circus BDoubliées (in French)
- Georges Pichard albums Bedetheque (in French)
