= Hara-Kiri (magazine) =

French satirical magazine

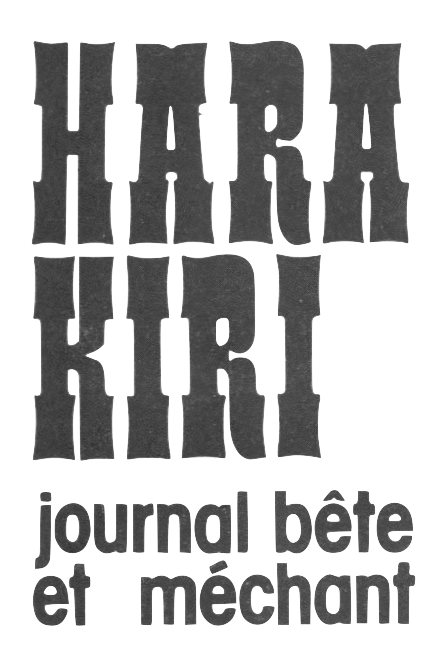
- Categories: Satirical magazine
- Frequency: Monthly
- Publisher: Éditions du Square
- Founder: Georges Bernier; François Cavanna; Fred Aristidès
- First issue: 1960
- Final issue: 1986
- Country: France
- Language: French

Hara-Kiri was a monthly French satirical magazine, first published in 1960, the precursor to Charlie Hebdo. It was created by Georges Bernier, François Cavanna and Fred Aristidès. A weekly counterpart, Hara-Kiri Hebdo, was first published in 1969.

Contributors included Melvin Van Peebles, Reiser, Roland Topor, Moebius, Wolinski, Gébé, Cabu, Delfeil de Ton, Fournier, Jean-Pierre Bouyxou and Willem. In 1966 it published Les Aventures de Jodelle, drawn by Guy Peellaert.

Hara-Kiri editions, subtitled "Journal bête et méchant" ("Stupid and nasty newspaper"), were constantly aiming at established social structures, be they political parties or institutions like the Church or the state. In 1961 and 1966 the monthly magazine was temporarily banned by the French government.

== Hara-Kiri Hebdo becomes Charlie Hebdo ==
In November 1970, following the death of Charles de Gaulle at his home in Colombey-les-Deux-Églises, the weekly Hara-Kiri Hebdo bore the headline « Bal tragique à Colombey : 1 mort » (Eng: "Tragic ball in Colombey: 1 death").

By way of contradistinction, the choice of the title refers to the far greater loss of life the same month: a fire at a discothèque in which 146 mostly young people died. The government felt this editorial choice was an offence of lèse-majesté against the deceased President, and its then minister of the interior Raymond Marcellin ordered an immediate and permanent ban on publicity and on sale to minors.

Charlie Hebdo was started immediately afterwards. Charlie in the title refers to General de Gaulle (said Georges Wolinski); but it was also the name of another magazine from Éditions du Square Charlie Mensuel, named after the character Charlie Brown from Charles M. Schulz's Peanuts.
