= Karl M. Baer =

German-Israeli author, social worker, reformer, suffragist and Zionist

Karl M. Baer (Hebrew: קרל באר; 20 May 1885 – 26 June 1956) was a German-Israeli author, social worker, reformer, and suffragist.

Born intersex and assigned female at birth, he came out as intersex in 1904 at the age of 19. In December 1906, he became the first transgender person to undergo sex reassignment surgery, and he became one of the first transgender people to gain full legal recognition of his gender identity by having a male birth certificate issued in January 1907. However, some researchers have disputed his label as a trans man, theorizing that he was intersex, and not transgender. However, intersex advocacy organizations like interACT reject the idea that being intersex is mutually exclusive with being transgender.

Baer wrote notes for sexologist Magnus Hirschfeld on his experiences growing up female while feeling inside that he was male. Together they developed these notes into the semi-fictional, semi-autobiographical Aus eines Mannes Mädchenjahren (Memoirs of a Man's Maiden Years) (1907) which was published under the pseudonym N.O. Body. The book "was immensely popular," being "adapted twice to film, in 1912 and 1919." Baer also gained the right to marry and did so in October 1907.

Despite him having undergone gender reaffirming surgery in 1906, exact records of the medical procedures he went through are unknown, as his medical records were burned in the 1930s Nazi book burning, that targeted Hirschfield studies specifically.

== Life ==
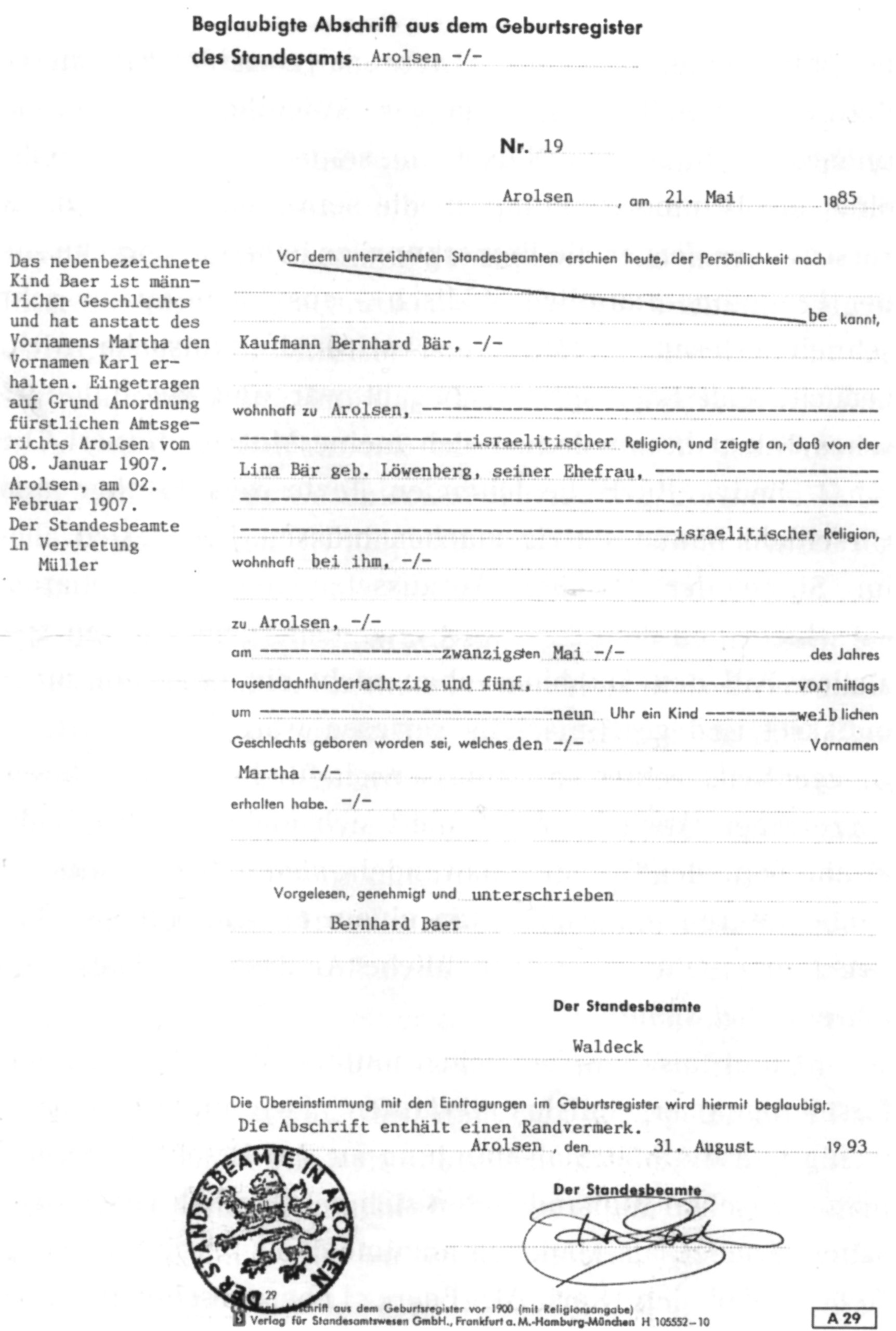
Beglaubigte Abschrift von Baers Geburtseintrag beim Standesamt Arolsen / 1969 Official Copy "certified copy" of his corrected entry in the German Births Register Arolsen (Hesse)

Baer was born on 20 May 1885. He was intersex, having been born with hypospadias. His "unusually shaped genitals" caused Baer's family to raise him as a girl, although he was "hormonally and, in accordance with present-day knowledge, genetically male" as well as identifying with the male gender.

=== Personal life and activism ===
Baer studied political economy, sociology and pedagogy in Berlin and Hamburg, and became a social worker (Volkspfleger) and confirmed suffragette. In May 1904 he was sent to Galicia under the auspices of the Hamburg chapter of the B'nai B'rith, to campaign against the trafficking of women from poor countries and for the rights of all women to education. Here, in Lemberg (now Lviv), Karl met the equally active Beile Halpern, who he was later to marry.

Baer's work included activism among local women. He encouraged them to campaign for kindergarten and school provision, which would allow women to hold jobs outside the home and reduce the financial hardship that prompted some to traffic their daughters or send them into service. Baer worked to oblige the authorities along established human trafficking paths to check ID documents and combat illegal movement. He also promoted the women's education movement, and became well known as a reformist throughout eastern Europe and Germany.

Baer had initially been sent to Galicia for two years; he returned to Germany after only one, having attracted censure for his male body language, argumentative style, and forceful advocacy of the cause. According to case notes by sexologist Magnus Hirschfeld of the Institute for Sexual Research, Baer then transitioned to his male identity and began living as a man. He was diagnosed as a "male pseudohermaphrodite" and underwent multi-stage rudimentary gender affirmation surgery in October 1906. After convalescence he was released from hospital in December 1906, with a medical certificate of his new gender. His new identity was confirmed by the courts in Arolsen (his birthplace) on 8 January 1907, with Berlin doctor Georg Merzbach acting as medical expert.

Karl Baer retained the middle initial "M", ostensibly stemming from his birth name, to connect him to his earlier publications under the name "M Baer". In later life he said the letter stood for "Max"; on his gravestone the middle name is given as "Meir". In October 1907 he married Beile Halpern; she died in March 1909, and he remarried, with Elza Max (1887–1947). From 1908 to 1911 Baer was an insurance sales agent; on 1 January 1911 he took up a post as Consul for Jewish Life in Berlin. In December 1920 he became director of the Berlin section of the loge B'nai B'rith, a post he held until the Section's forcible closure by the Gestapo on 19 April 1937. Baer was by then an important figure in Jewish society, and his influence on cultural life brought him into conflict with the Nazi administration. He was allowed to emigrate with his wife in June 1938 to Palestine, later to become Israel, where he worked between 1942 and 1950 as an insurance agent.

By 1950 he was going blind and had to give up his job. He lived in a throuple with his wife and his secretary, Gitla Fish, who moved to live with him and his wife. He is buried in the Kiryat-Shaul cemetery in Tel Aviv under the name Karl Meir Baer.

== Book and film ==
As part of his analysis and therapy, Baer wrote notes for Hirschfeld on his experiences growing up as a girl while feeling inside that he was male. He and Hirschfeld together worked up these notes into the semi-fictional, semi-autobiographical Aus eines Mannes Mädchenjahren, "Memoirs of a man's maiden years", published in 1907 under the pseudonym N.O. Body. Details of Baer's background were also changed to prevent readers identifying him from the text. Hirschfeld, a keen advocate of the notion of a 'third sex', to which anyone uncomfortable with gender norms or sexual dichotomy could attribute themselves, hoped the book would explain the dilemma that many intersexed children suffered when forced into a two-gender system. The book went through several reprints and translations, earning Baer a continuing income in later life. Later editions, especially those published after the First World War, were rewritten in light of shifts in social acceptance and to fulfil new social and political aims.

In 1919 Karl Grune adapted Baer's book into a fictional autobiography, and into the script for a silent film starring the German actress Erika Glässner (1890–1959) as "Nobody". No copy of the film seems to have survived the Nazi period and Second World War.

Historian and writer Hermann Simon, whose aunts and mother were friends of Baer and his wife, wrote a small book, Wer ist Nobody? ("Who is Nobody?") for inclusion in a 1993 print edition of Aus eines Mannes Mädchenjahren.

An English translation by Deborah Simon, based on a German post-war reprint, was published in 2005 under the name Memoirs of a Man's Maiden Years.

In March 2026, a French translation of the book was published by Seuil, titled "Mémoires des années de jeune fille d'un homme," along with an essay by the French-based Spanish philosopher Paul Preciado.
