= Charlie Mensuel =

French monthly comics magazine

- Editor: Georges Wolinski (1970–1981)
- Categories: Satirical comics magazine
- Frequency: Monthly
- Publisher: Éditions du Square (1969–1981); Éditions Dargaud (1982–1986)
- Founder: Delfeil de Ton and Georges Bernier
- First issue: 1 February 1969
- Final issue: 1 February 1986
- Country: France
- Based in: Paris, France
- Language: French

Logo

Charlie Mensuel (or simply Charlie, "mensuel" being a French term for a monthly periodical) was a French monthly comics magazine. Its publication began in February 1969, and ceased in February 1986.

Tagged "The newspaper full of humour and comic strips", it also adopted the slogan, "The newspaper one reads on the couch while munching chocolate". Charlie was originally the French version of a contemporary Italian magazine, linus. Like its Italian counterpart, it took its name from one of the characters of the comic strip Peanuts, in that case Charlie Brown. The comics featured in Charlie included French originals as well as translations of American strips—Peanuts and others—and of Italian stories originally published in Linus.

== History ==
Charlie was first published on 1 February 1969, founded by Delfeil de Ton (with Georges Bernier's Éditions du Square); del Ton was its first editor-in-chief.

Several people succeeded to the position of editor-in-chief, most notably Georges Wolinski, from 1970 to 1981. The position had also been held by Willem and Mandryka.

In 1970, it gave its name to Charlie Hebdo (English: Charlie Weekly), successor to L'Hebdo Hara-Kiri, following the prohibition of that publication.

Charlie Mensuel ceased publication for the first time in September 1981, but was purchased by Éditions Dargaud and reappeared in April 1982. On 1 February 1986, the final issue was published and the magazine merged with Pilote magazine. A new magazine began publication on 1 March under the name Pilote et Charlie, but this lasted only until the magazine reverted to Pilote on 1 September 1988.
