= Georges Wolinski =

French cartoonist (1934–2015)

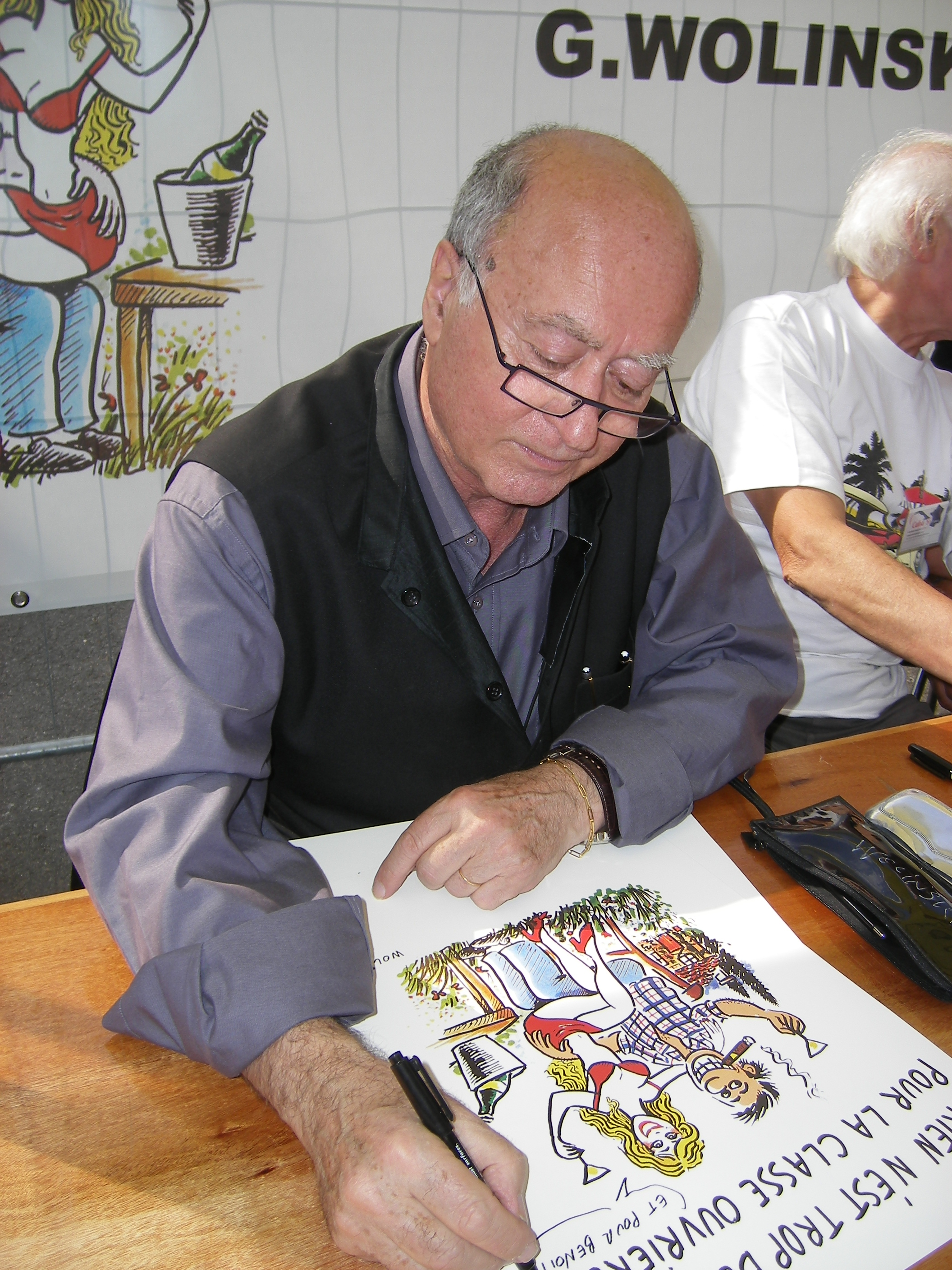
- Wolinski in 2007
- Born: Georges David Wolinski; 28 June 1934 Tunis, French Tunisia
- Died: 7 January 2015 (aged 80) Paris, France
- Areas: Writer; cartoonist
- Notable works: Paulette; C’est la faute à la société
- Awards: Grand Prix de la ville d'Angoulême, 2005; Legion of Honour, 2005

Signature
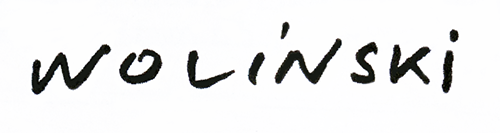

Georges David Wolinski (French: [vɔlɛ̃ski]; 28 June 1934 – 7 January 2015) was a French cartoonist and comics writer. He was killed on 7 January 2015 in the Charlie Hebdo shooting.

== Early life ==
Georges David Wolinski was born on 28 June 1934 in Tunis, French Tunisia to Jewish parents, Lola Bembaron and Siegfried Wolinski. His father, who was from Poland, was murdered in 1936 when Wolinski was two years old. His mother was a Tunisian of Jewish descent. He moved to metropolitan France in 1945 shortly after World War II. He started studying architecture in Paris and following his graduation he began cartooning.

== Career ==
Wolinski began cartooning for Rustica in 1958, and started drawing political cartoons in 1960. Three years later, in 1961, he started contributing political and erotic cartoons and comic strips to the satirical monthly Hara-Kiri.

During the student revolts of May 1968, Wolinski co-founded the satirical magazine L'Enragé with Jean-Jacques Pauvert and Siné. He served as the editor-in-chief of Hara-Kiri from 1961 to 1970. In the early 1970s, Wolinski collaborated with the comics artist Georges Pichard to create Paulette which appeared in Charlie Mensuel and provoked reactions in France during its publication. Wolinski's work appeared in the daily newspaper Libération, the weekly Paris-Match, L'Écho des savanes and Charlie Hebdo.

In 2005, he was the recipient of the Grand Prix de la ville d'Angoulême at the Angoulême Festival. The same year he was also awarded the Legion of Honour.

== Motorsport ==
Wolinski was responsible for the design of the livery of several art cars that raced in various sportscar championships and in the Le Mans 24 Hours.

== Personal life ==
After the loss of his first wife, Jacqueline Saba, in 1966, in a car accident, he married Maryse Wolinski in 1972.

== Death ==
Along with seven of his colleagues, two police officers, and two other people, Wolinski was killed on 7 January 2015 in the Charlie Hebdo shooting when armed terrorists stormed the Charlie Hebdo newspaper offices in Paris.

The asteroid 293499 Wolinski was named in his memory on 22 February 2016 by its discoverer Jean-Claude Merlin.

== Bibliography ==
- Paulette, art by Georges Pichard
  - Paulette Tome 1, 1971
  - Paulette Tome 2, 1972
  - Le mariage de Paulette, Le Square, 1974
  - Paulette en Amazonie, Le Square, 1975
  - Ras-le-bol-ville, Le Square, 1975
  - Le cirque des femmes, Le Square, 1977
  - Les Pensées, Le Square, 1981
  - Paulette, Dargaud, 1984

== Other works ==
A text on the Tunisian Revolution, « Les Tunisiens sont « sages » », published in the book Dégage ! une révolution, Phébus, 2012, pp. 164–165, ISBN 978-2-7529-0671-7.

== See also ==
- List of journalists killed in Europe
