= François Cavanna =

French writer and satirical newspaper editor (1923–2014)

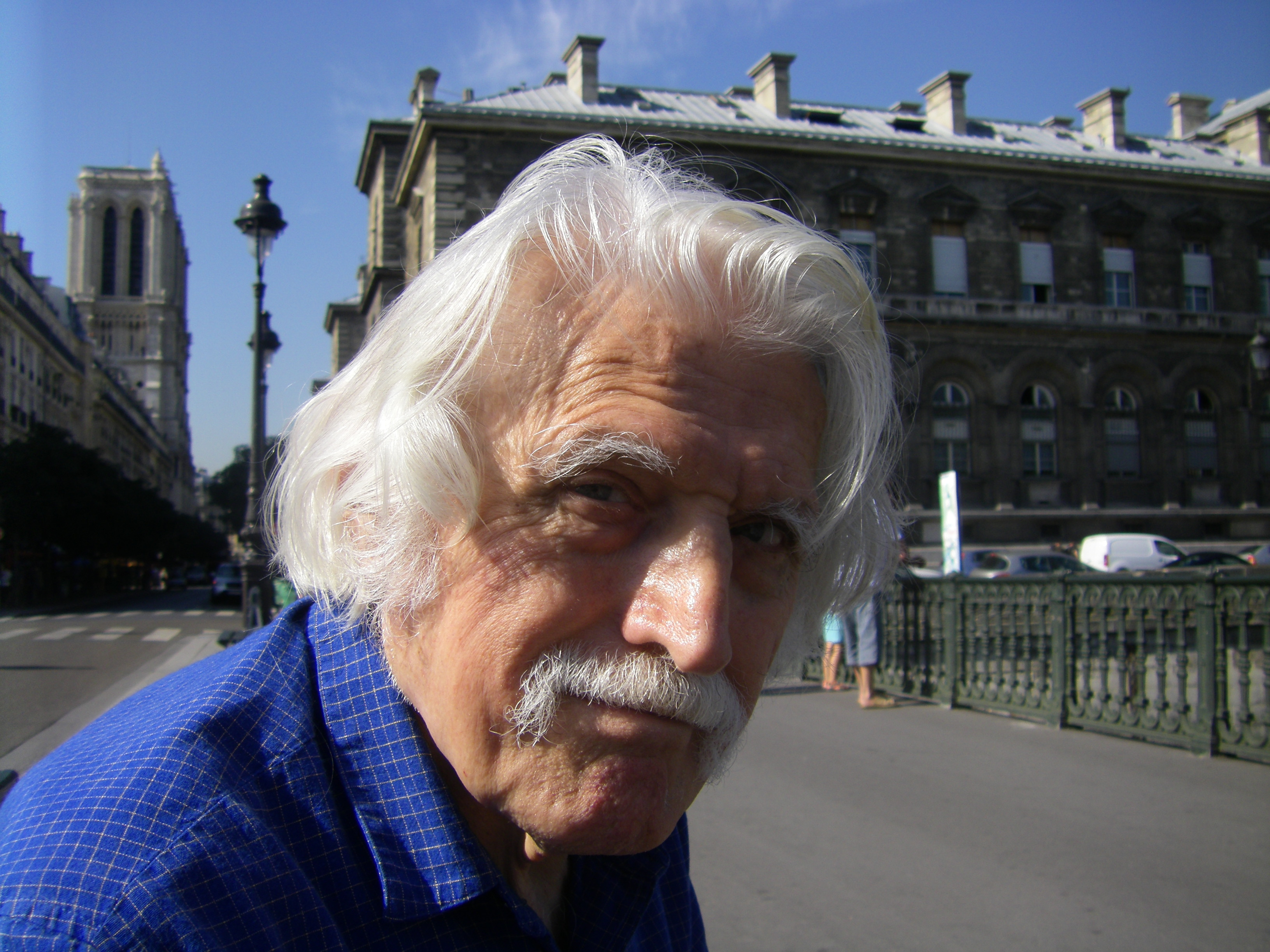
- François Cavanna in 2008
- Born: 22 February 1923; Nogent-sur-Marne, France
- Died: 29 January 2014 (aged 90); Créteil, France
- Occupations: French author and satirical newspaper editor

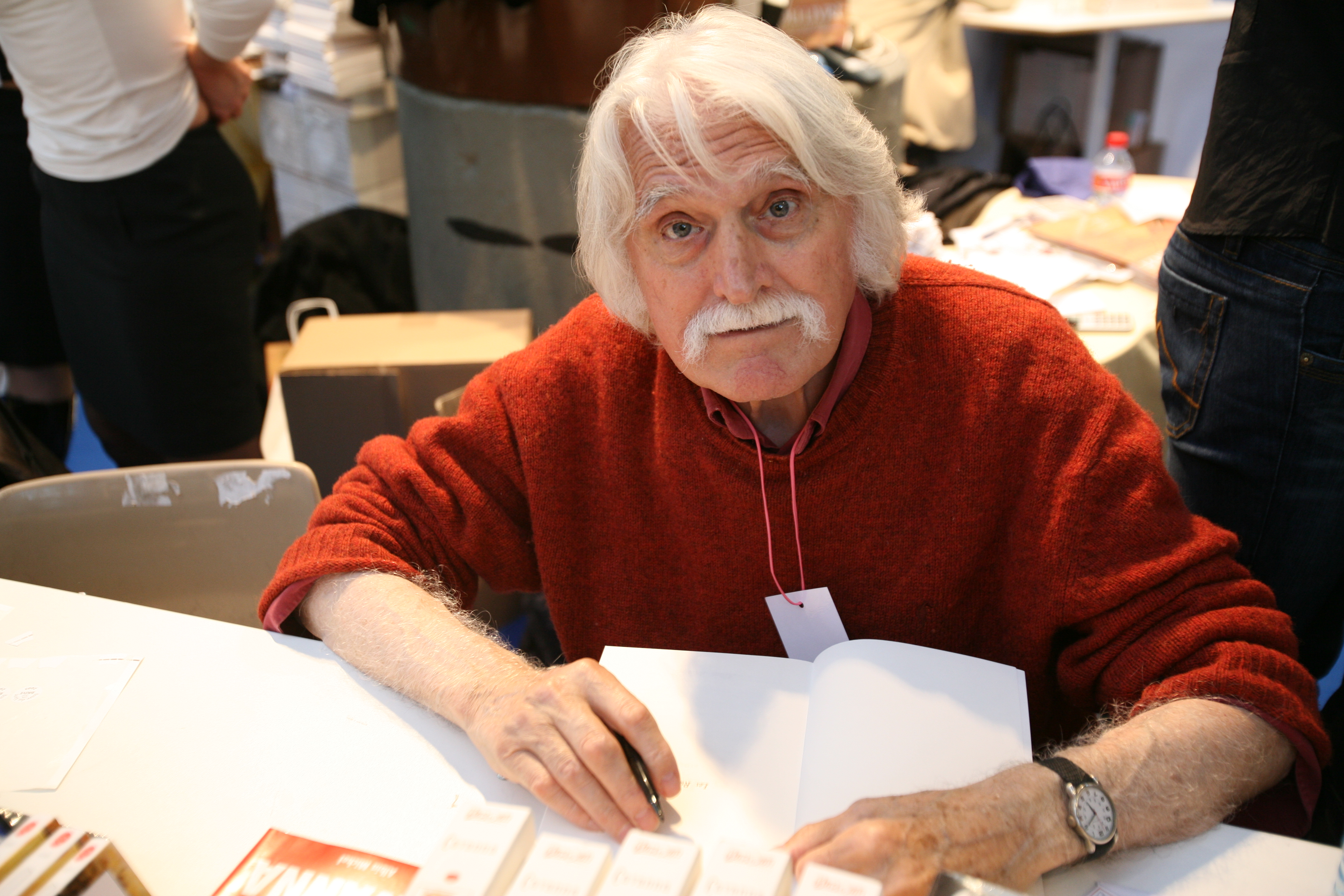
Cavanna in 2005

François Cavanna (French: [fʁɑ̃swa kavana]; 22 February 1923 – 29 January 2014) was a French author and satirical newspaper editor.

Cavanna contributed to the creation and success of Hara-Kiri and Charlie Hebdo. He wrote in a variety of genres including reportage, satire, essays, novels, autobiography and humor. He also translated six books about famous cartoonists.

== Biography ==
Cavanna was born in Nogent-sur-Marne. Although raised in France, he grew up surrounded by Italian immigrants due to his father being from Bettola, Italy. He dealt with this part of his life in his books Les Ritals and L'œil du lapin. At the age of 16, he took up various part-time jobs. He delivered letters for the postal service, sold fruit and vegetables, and was a mason's apprentice. His journalistic début came in 1945 when he began to work for the daily Libération.

In November 1969, Hara-Kiri''s sister weekly magazine was banned. Cavanna came up with the idea of renaming the magazine for the next week's issue, and thus, Charlie Hebdo was born.

Later, he turned to autobiographical writing. Les Ritals dealt with his childhood, while Les Russkoffs (and later Maria) documented his experience in World War II, when he was transported to Germany to serve in the Service du Travail Obligatoire (Frenchmen serving as German slave-labour). Les Russkoffs was the novel for which he won the Prix Interallié in 1979. In Bête et méchant and Les yeux plus grands que le ventre he tells his hilarious experiences in Hara-Kiri and Charlie Hebdo. His final book, Lune de miel, published while he was still alive, deals with Cavanna's Parkinson disease.

== Publications ==
- 4, rue Choron (1965)
- Cavanna (1968)
- Je l’ai pas lu, je l’ai pas vu, mais j’en ai entendu causer (1970)
- Les aventures de Dieu (1971)
- Le saviez-vous? 1 (1971)
- L'Aurore de l'humanité I : Et le singe devient con (1972)
- Le saviez-vous? 2 (1974)
- L'Aurore de l'humanité II : Le con se surpasse (1975)
- Je l’ai pas lu, je l’ai pas vu, mais j’en ai entendu causer: chroniques de Hara Kiri hebdo, 1969 I (1975)
- Je l’ai pas lu, je l’ai pas vu, mais j’en ai entendu causer: chroniques de Hara Kiri hebdo, 1969 II (1975)
- Je l’ai pas lu, je l’ai pas vu, mais j’en ai entendu causer: chroniques de Hara Kiri hebdo, 1970 (1976)
- Stop-crève (1976)
- L'Aurore de l'humanité III : Où s'arrêtera-t-il? (1977)
- Gauche, droite, piège à cons: chroniques de Hara Kiri hebdo de 1969 à 1976 (1978)
- Les Ritals (1978)
- Les Russkoffs (1979)
- La Grande Encyclopédie Bête et Méchante (1980)
- Louise la Pétroleuse (1981)
- Bête et méchant (1981)
- La Nouvelle Encyclopédie Bête et Méchante (1982)
- Les Écritures – Les Aventures de Dieu et du petit Jésus (1982;2002)
- Les yeux plus grands que le ventre (1983)
- L'Almanach de Cavanna (1984)
- Maria (1985)
- Les fosses carolines (1986)
- L’Oeil du Lapin (1987)
- Les doigts plein d'encre (Photos de Robert Doisneau) (1987)
- La couronne d’Irène (1988)
- Les Aventures de Napoléon (1988)
- Mignonne, allons voir si la rose... (1989)
- Maman, au secours! (Dessins de Altan)(1990)
- La belle fille sur le tas d’ordures (1991)
- Coups de sang (1991)
- Les grands imposteurs (1991)
- Nos ancêtres les Gaulois, ou, l’histoire de France redécouverte par Cavanna (1991)
- Cavanna par Cavanna (1992)
- Le temps des égorgeurs (1992)
- Dieu, Mozart, Le Pen et les autres: les nouveaux imposteurs (1992)
- De Coluche à Mitterrand: l’intégrale de Cavanna dans Charlie Hebdo, année 1981 (1993)
- Tonton, Messaline, Judas et les autres (1993;1999)
- Les enfants de Germinal (1993)
- Lettre ouverte aux culs-bénits (1994)
- Les pensées (1994)
- Coeur d'artichaut (1995)
- La déesse mère: roman (1997)
- Je t'aime (Dessins de Barbe) (1998)
- Les Mérovingiens 1: Le Hun blond (1998). Historical romance about events in Gaul and Frankish Europe in the decades after Attila the Hun
- Les Mérovingiens 2: La hache et la croix (1999)
- Les Mérovingiens 3: Le dieu de Clotilde (2000)
- Les Mérovingiens 4: Le sang de Clovis (2001)
- Les Mérovingiens 5: Les reines rouges (2002)
- Au fond du jardin (Photos de Patricia Méaille) (2002)
- Les imposteurs (2003)
- Sur les murs de la classe (2003)
- Les Mérovingiens 6: L'adieu aux reines (2004)
- Les années Charlie: 1969-2004 (2004)
- Cavanna à Charlie Hebdo:1969-1981: Je l'ai pas lu, je l'ai pas vu... (2005)
- Plus je regarde les hommes, plus j'aime les femmes... (2005)
- Le voyage (2006). A historical novel about the voyages of Christopher Columbus told from the point of view of an Irish shipmate.
- Hara Kiri Les belles images (2008)
- Cavanna raconte Cavanna (2008)
- La pub nous prend pour des cons, la pub nous rend cons (2009)
- Instants de grâce (Photos de Leloir) (2010)
- Le pire de Hara Kiri (2010)
- Lune de miel (2010)
- CRÈVE, DUCON ! (2020)

== Translations by Cavanna ==
- 1971 : Li'l Abner, Éditions du Square
- 1979 : Crasse-Tignasse, éd. L'École des Loisirs
- 1980 : Max et Moritz de Wilhelm Busch, éd. L'École des Loisirs
- 1988 : L'Univers impitoyable de Gary Larson, éd. Presses de la Cité
- 1989 : L'Univers impitoyable de Gary Larson contre-attaque, éd. Presses de la Cité
- 2007 : Je ne suis pas n'importe qui ! Jules Feiffer, éd. Futuropolis
