= Deaths in September 1977 =

The following is a list of notable deaths in September 1977. Entries for each day are listed alphabetically by surname. A typical entry lists information in the following sequence:

- Name, age, country of citizenship at birth, subsequent country of citizenship (if applicable), reason for notability, cause of death (if known), and reference.

== September 1977 ==
=== 1 ===
- Henry Vars, 74, Polish-American composer, arranger and conductor,he got his first break via the Columbia Records Company, Vars and his family settled in Los Angeles, where he began writing film scores professionally, Vars became a close friend of John Wayne, and his songs were performed by well-known artists of his era, such as Margaret Whiting, Bing Crosby, Doris Day, Brenda Lee, and Dinah Shore.
- Ethel Waters, 80, American singer and actress, in 1939, Waters became the first African American to star in her own television show, The Ethel Waters Show (June 1939), a variety special, appeared on NBC's New York station on June 14, 1939,; it included a dramatic performance of the Broadway play Mamba's Daughters (1939), based on the Gullah community of South Carolina and produced with Waters herself in mind, Waters was nominated for the Academy Award for Best Supporting Actress for her role as Dicey Johnson in the drama film Pinky (1949),death caused by uterine cancer, kidney failure, and other ailments.

=== 3 ===
- Mona Darkfeather, 95, American actress, she was a member of the prominent pioneer Workman–Temple family of Los Angeles,for a while after she retired as a screen actress, she performed on the stage and headlined as Princess Darkfeather,; in late August 1918, she made a special appearance at the Liberty Theater in Tacoma, Washington, as an actress, singer and lecturer,; in her "rattlesnake" dress, she appeared after each showing of the feature film Eyes of the World (1917) to sing and to give advice to all girls in the audience who had the ambition to enter show business,death caused by a stroke, due to cerebral atherosclerosis.

=== 4 ===
- E. F. Schumacher, 66, German-born British statistician and economist, he is best known for his proposals for human-scale, decentralised and appropriate technologies, during the aftermath of World War II, Schumacher worked as an economic advisor to, and later Chief Statistician for, the British Control Commission, which was charged with rebuilding the German economy,from 1950 until 1970, he was the Chief Economic Adviser to the National Coal Board (NCB),he died of a heart attack on arrival at Billens hospital in Romont, Switzerland; after falling ill on a train in Zurich during a lecture tour.

=== 5 ===
- Claudia Dell, 67, American showgirl, actress, and modeling instructor,starting her film career as a contract player for Warner Bros. Pictures in 1930, Dell appeared in over 30 films until her film career ended in 1944.
- Tatsuo Yoshida, 45, Japanese manga artist, illustrator, and businessman, he was an anime pioneer who founded the animation studio Tatsunoko Production, Yoshida supported the dawn of Japanese animation by producing numerous early hits, such as Speed Racer (1967–1968), The Genie Family (1969–1970), The Adventures of Hutch the Honeybee (1970 –1971), and Science Ninja Team Gatchaman (1972–1974), death caused by liver cancer.

=== 7 ===
- Alexis, 30, French comics artist, he started working for the magazine Pilote in 1968, providing illustrations and gags,in 1976, Alexis started the humorous western series Al Crane, in collaboration with Gérard Lauzier, and in 1977 he succeeded Gotlib as the main artist of the series Superdupont,death caused by a ruptured aneurysm.Alexis was also the original artist of the first graphic novel in the series Snowpiercer. Due to his early death, he only completed ten pages of the graphic novel and was then replaced by Jean-Marc Rochette.

=== 8 ===
- Zero Mostel, 62, American actor, comedian, and singer, he won the 1961 Tony Award for Best Actor in a Play for his role as John in Rhinocéros, and he twice won the Tony Award for Best Actor in a Musical for his roles as Pseudolus in A Funny Thing Happened on the Way to the Forum and Tevye in Fiddler on the Roof, while hospitalized in the Thomas Jefferson University Hospital and thought to be recovering from a respiratory disorder, Mostel complained of dizziness and then fell unconscious. The attending physicians were unable to revive him, and he was pronounced dead that evening, his death was attributed to an aortic aneurysm.

=== 9 ===
- Kenneth O'Donnell, 53, American political consultant,; in 1961, he became President John F. Kennedy's special assistant and Appointments Secretary, he later advised the President during the preparation for the Bay of Pigs Invasion (1961) and during the Cuban Missile Crisis (1962),after serving as a presidential aide to Lyndon B. Johnson until early 1965, O'Donnell resigned in order to try to win the Democratic nomination for the position of Governor of Massachusetts in 1966,; he lost by 64,000 votes to the rival candidate Edward J. McCormack Jr. in a race that was much closer than the polls had predicted, in 1968, O'Donnell served as a campaign manager for his former roommate Robert F. Kennedy, in Robert's bid for the presidency,on August 11, 1977, O'Donnell was admitted to the Beth Israel Hospital in Boston for a gastrointestinal ailment brought on from the effects of his alcoholism, his condition grew progressively worse and he died on September 9, with no recovery in the intervening period.

=== 12 ===
- Steve Biko, 30, South African anti-apartheid activist, he was one of the leading figures of the Black Consciousness Movement, which centred on psychological empowerment, through combating the feelings of inferiority that most black South Africans exhibited, Biko believed that, as part of the struggle against apartheid and white-minority rule, blacks should affirm their own humanity by regarding themselves as worthy of freedom and its attendant responsibilities, Biko promoted the slogan "black is beautiful", explaining that this meant "Man, you are okay as you are. Begin to look upon yourself as a human being."during an interrogation, Biko was severely beaten by at least one of ten security police officers, he consequently suffered three brain lesions that resulted in a massive brain haemorrhage on 6 September, about a week later, he died alone in a cell. According to an autopsy, an "extensive brain injury" had caused "centralisation of the blood circulation to such an extent that there had been intravasal blood coagulation, acute kidney failure, and uremia".
- Robert Lowell, 60, American poet, he was appointed the sixth Consultant in Poetry to the Library of Congress, where he served from 1947 until 1948, during the 1960s, Lowell was the most public, well-known American poet; in June 1967, he appeared on the cover of Time as part of a cover story in which he was praised as "the best American poet of his generation", Lowell died from a heart attack in a taxicab in Manhattan, while on his way to see his ex-wife.

=== 13 ===
- Leopold Stokowski, 95, British conductor,Stokowski rapidly gained a reputation as a musical showman,; his flair for the theatrical included grand gestures, such as throwing the sheet music on the floor to show that he did not need to conduct from a score, he also experimented with new lighting arrangements in the concert hall, many music critics have taken exception to the liberties Stokowski took in modifying the orchestrations of some of the works which he conducted—liberties which were common in the nineteenth century, but had mostly died out in the twentieth, when faithful adherence to the composer's scores became more common,Stokowski is best known to the public for his collaborated with Walt Disney to create the animated feature film Fantasia (1940), he conducted all the music (with the exception of a "jam session" in the middle of the film) and included his own orchestrations for Johann Sebastian Bach's Toccata and Fugue in D minor (written between 1704 and the 1750s), and a combination of Modest Mussorgsky's Night on Bald Mountain (1867) with Franz Schubert's Ave Maria (1825), Stokowski even got to talk to (and shake hands with) Mickey Mouse on screen, in a famous silhouette footage, death caused by a heart attack.

=== 14 ===
- Sandra Mozarowsky, 18, Spanish actress, her film credits included the horror film School of Death (1975),she was fatally injured when she fell from a balcony, but the circumstaces of her death are uncertain. Andrew Morton's account of the death reports that Mozarowsky fell off her apartment balcony while watering her plants, with rumors attributig her fall to either suicide or murder.The account of the pseudonymous author Tom Farrell reports that Mozarowsky was fatally assaulted, because she was pregnant and expected to give birth to an illegitimate son of her lover, Juan Carlos I.

=== 16 ===
- Marc Bolan, 29, English guitarist, singer-songwriter and poet, he was a pioneer of the glam rock movement in the early 1970s with his band T. Rex,killed in a car crash, as a passenger. The intoxicated driver had been drinking alcohol at a party, she drove the car into a collision with a fence post and then crashed the car into a sycamore tree.
- Maria Callas, 53, American and Greek soprano,adored by many opera enthusiasts, Callas was a controversial artist,; Callas was a great singer who was often dismissed as a mere actress,she considered herself foremost a musician, the first instrument of the orchestra,death caused by a heart attack.

=== 18 ===
- Paul Bernays, 88, Swiss mathematician,he co-introduced the Hilbert–Bernays paradox, which was used by the eponymous mathenaticians to show that a sufficiently strong consistent theory cannot contain its own reference functor.

=== 21 ===
- Ruth Mix, 65, American actress,she was a daughter of the actor Tom Mix and she played the female lead in a few B-westerns, she retired from acting at an early age, becoming a roping artist and trick rider for her father's circus and wild west show, in 1929, she performed in vaudeville, performing "in a novelty offering including singing and dancing" and heading a Rodeo Revue show.

=== 25 ===
- Phyllis Neilson-Terry, 84, English actress,she was a third-generation member of the Terry family, a British theatrical dynasty, one of her last major roles was in Terence Rattigan's Separate Tables (1954), she appeared in productions of this play in both West End theatre and on Broadway theatre.

=== 27 ===
- Willis Bouchey, 70, American character actor,on old-time radio, Bouchey played the title role in Captain Midnight, Charles Williams in Kitty Keene, Inc., Stanley Bartlett in Midstream, and Pa Barton in The Story of Bud Barton.

=== 28 ===
- Vera Georgiyevna Orlova, 83, Russian actress,she garnered fame during the late Imperial Russian and early Soviet eras.

=== 29 ===
- Robert McKimson, 66. American animator and illustrator, he started his animation career in mid-1929, when hired by Walt Disney Productions as an assistant animator to Dick Lundy,he later served as an animation director for Warner Bros. Cartoons, where McKimson created characters like Foghorn Leghorn, the Tasmanian Devil, and Speedy Gonzales, as well as directing every Hippety Hopper/Sylvester the Cat pairing,death caused by a heart attack. Two days before his death, McKimson's doctor declared him in good health for a 66-year-old (despite having a case of emphysema after years of smoking), and McKimson had bragged to his colleagues that he was likely going to survive them.

=== 30 ===
- Mary Ford, 53, American guitarist and vocalist,she was a member of the husband-and-wife musical duo Les Paul and Mary Ford, by 1943, Ford (under her original name Colleen Summers), Vivian Earles and June Widener had formed the Sunshine Girls, a western trio who sang backup to Jimmy Wakely and his trio,they were regulars on The Hollywood Barn Dance, a successful weekly CBS Radio program broadcast on Saturday nights.
- Saul Levitt, 66, American playwright, he is best known for his successful play The Andersonville Trial (1959), based on MacKinlay Kantor's Pulitzer-Prize-winning novel Andersonville (1955),during his military service in World War II, he was a member of the reporting staff of the magazine Yank, the Army Weekly,death caused by heart failure.

== Sources ==
- Ahluwalia, Pal; Zegeye, Abebe (2001). "Frantz Fanon and Steve Biko: Towards Liberation". Social Identities. 7 (3): 455–469. doi:10.1080/13504630120087262. S2CID 143223447.
- Bernstein, Hilda (1978). No. 46 – Steve Biko. London: International Defence and Aid Fund. ISBN 978-0-904759-21-1.
- Hill, Shannen L. (2015). Biko's Ghost: The Iconography of Black Consciousness. Minneapolis: University of Minnesota Press. ISBN 978-0816676361.
- Larkin, Colin, ed. Encyclopedia of Popular Music, 4th ed. Ed. "Les Paul". Oxford Music Online. Oxford University Press. Web. February 22, 2015.
- Mangcu, Xolela (2014). Biko: A Life. London and New York: I. B. Tauris. ISBN 978-1-78076-785-7.
- Woods, Donald (1978). Biko. New York and London: Paddington Press. ISBN 0-8050-1899-9.
