= L'Écho des savanes =

Franco-Belgian comics magazine founded in 1972

L'Écho des savanes Issue #1, cover by Bretécher

L’Écho des Savanes is a Franco-Belgian comics magazine founded in May 1972 by Claire Bretécher, Marcel Gotlib and Nikita Mandryka. It featured the work of French and international authors and graphic artists in mature-oriented comics over the course of 34 years and temporarily ended publication in December 2006. It was relaunched in 2008.

== History ==
The first issue of L’Écho des Savanes was published on 1 May 1972. It was the only issue that year, although popular demand caused it to be reprinted in several editions. All its pages (except for the cover) were in black and white and exclusively contained the work of its founders, Bretécher, Gotlib and Mandryka. Marked as a publication for adults, it staked a different course than Pilote magazine, the family-friendly publication the founders had a long relationship with. Over the following two years, it was a quarterly publication. Only near the end of this period, work by other creators began to appear, such as Alexis, Harvey Kurtzman, Jean Solé, and Moebius.

The founders of L'Écho des savanes, as illustrated by Gotlib

In 1975, the magazine adapted a bi-monthly schedule, and from 1976 it became monthly. Although no longer labeled "for adults", the usual cover imagery suggested nothing about the contents had changed. During this period, contributions began to arrive from creators such as Neal Adams, Richard Corben, Robert Crumb, Dick Giordano, Alejandro Jodorowsky, Jeff Jones, Gérard Lauzier, Jacques Lob, Masse, Georges Pichard, Jacques Tardi, Martin Veyron, Wallace Wood and Berni Wrightson.

From the late 1970s, leading to 1982's suspension of publication, L'Écho continued a successful run, including frequent editions of L'Écho special U.S.A., and a side publication titled Virus (five issues in 1980–1981). The work by Bretécher, Gotlib, and Mandryka stopped appearing, and notable additions to the pool of contributors were Jean Michel Charlier, Guido Crepax, Jean-Claude Forest, Carlos Giménez, Tanino Liberatore and Art Spiegelman.

=== 1982-2006 ===
Purchased by publisher Albin Michel, L'Écho relaunched June 1 after a five-month pause, making alterations to the image of the magazine. Among the new contributors were Baru, Will Eisner, Milo Manara, Frank Miller, Jean-Marc Reiser, Alex Toth, Jano and Alex Varenne. In addition to "adult" comic strips, issues contained articles featuring photographs of semi-naked women (imagery echoed on the covers).

A weekly version, initially named L’Hebdo Écho des Savanes, and later L’Ebdo was launched in 1984 in place of the monthly magazine for a few months.

The December 2006 issue was to be the final release of L'Écho, after a decision by Lagardère Active Media to cease publication.

=== 2008 ===
Glénat publisher restarted the publication from 28 March 2008, with issue number 267.

== See also ==
- Franco-Belgian comics
