= Superdupont =

French comic strip

Superdupont, with a Gallic rooster, in a position spoofing a classic Superman pose

Superdupont is a French comic series created in 1972 by Marcel Gotlib and Jacques Lob. It is a parody of American superhero comics that sends up French national attitudes and jingoism.

== Publication history ==
Superdupont was initially published in the Franco-Belgian comics magazine Pilote from September 21, 1972, and moved to Gotlib's own magazine Fluide Glacial in 1975.

The series, published irregularly through the decades, was originally written by Lob and Gotlib (who teamed up after finding out they had both had the same idea independently) and drawn by Gotlib. Gotlib passed on the art duties to Alexis, who was succeeded by Jean Solé after his 1977 death. Episodes have been drawn by Daniel Goossens, Al Coutelis, François Boucq, Gotlib again, and Neal Adams. After Lob died in 1990, the series was written again by Gotlib with co-writers Lefred-Thouron, Bouck, and then Belkrouf. No Superdupont comics have been made since Gotlib's death in 2016.

== The character ==
Superdupont is the son of the Unknown Soldier buried under the Arc de Triomphe. He is caricaturally chauvinistic and gifted with superpowers that help him defend his country against a secret terrorist organization called "Anti-France."

Anti-France agents are all foreigners and thus speak the fictional language "Anti-Français," a mishmash of English, Spanish, Italian, Russian, and German.

The physical appearance of Superdupont is a superhero version of a stereotyped Frenchman: he wears a traditional beret, a white ribbed A-shirt with the initials S and D inside a French cockade, white long johns, Charentaise slippers, a tricolor belt held by a safety pin, and a long blue cape. He also supports economic patriotism, as he smokes Gauloises cigarettes, drinks red wine, eats French cheese, and refuses to be painted using China ink.

Like Superman, Superdupont is able to fly. He also possesses some degree of superhuman strength, though his main fighting ability is to be a master at savate, also known as boxe française ("French boxing"). He can be incapacitated if he hears the Marseillaise played backward, which is for him the equivalent of kryptonite.

== Publications ==
- Tome 1: Superdupont (by Jacques Lob, Gotlib and Alexis)
- Tome 2: Amour et forfaiture (by Jacques Lob, Gotlib and Solé)
- Tome 3: Opération Camembert (by Jacques Lob, Gotlib and Solé)
- Tome 4: Oui nide Iou (by Jacques Lob, Gotlib, Alexis, Solé, Daniel Goossens, Neal Adams and Coutelis)
- Tome 5: Les âmes noires (by Jacques Lob, Gotlib, Alexis, Solé)
- Tome 6: Superdupont pourchasse l'ignoble (by Marcel Gotlib, Lefred-Thouron, Solé)

== See also ==
- Superlópez (Spanish counterpart)

== Sources ==
- Superdupont publications in Pilote and Fluide Glacial BDoubliées (in French)
- Superdupont albums Bedethque (in French)

Footnotes
