= Le Dernier Cri =

French artist collective

Le Dernier Cri is a Marseille based publishing house focused on publishing books, prints, silkscreens, posters and original art of visual artists that produce underground art. Pakito Bolino and Caroline Sury started the organisation in 1992. Besides publishing art le Dernier Cri also sets up other activities such as film screening, and expositions.

They have published works of Matthias Lehmann, Mike Diana, Fredox, Marcel Ruijters, Pakito Bolino, Caroline Sury, Henriette Valium, Ichiba Daisuke, Matti Hagelberg, Stu Mead, Blexbolex, Quentin Faucompré, Moolinex, Charles Burns, Keiti Ota, Reinhard Scheibner, Frédéric Poincelet, Nuvish, Les Frères Guedin, Atak, Colin Raff, Jonathon Rosen, Rémi, Kerozen, Laetitia Brochier, Stéphane Blanquet, Francis Masse, Manuel Ocampo, Andy Bolus, Dave 2000, Sven Baslev.

In 2014 the organisation organised a big exhibition called Mangaro about 40 years of underground manga in La Friche. Artists of the Dernier Cri collectif have also decorated the walls inside the underground music venue l'Embobineuse.

== Documentation ==
- French interview with Pakito Bolino about the start up of le Dernier Cri
