= Rock & Folk =

Prominent French popular music magazine

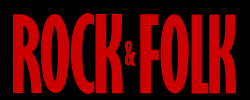
- Editor-in-Chief: Vincent Tannières
- Categories: Music magazine
- Frequency: Monthly
- Publisher: Patrick Casanovas
- First issue: 1966
- Company: Editions Larivière
- Country: France
- Based in: Paris
- Language: French
- Website: www.rocknfolk.com
- ISSN: 0750-7852

Rock & Folk is a French music magazine founded in 1966, and published in the Paris suburb of Clichy. Editor in chief were Philippe Koechlin, Philippe Paringaux, Eric Breton, Philippe Manœuvre and now Vincent Tannières. Though the magazine's title includes the word "folk," it is in fact oriented strongly toward rock and roll. The magazine has also broadened its scope of rock and folk to include coverage of newer electronic music as well as hip hop.

The magazine published Marcel Gotlib's comic strip Hamster Jovial between 1971 and 1974.
