= List of Franco-Belgian comics magazines =

This is a list of list of Franco-Belgian comics magazines. Belgium and France have a long tradition in comics. They have a common history for comics (bandes dessinées) and magazines.

In the early years of its history, magazines had a large place on the comics market and were often the only place where comics were published. Most of them were kids-targeted.

In the 1970s, satirical and more adult publications begun to appear. In the 1990s, there was a large pallet of comics magazine. In the late 1990s, some notable comics have disappeared and only a few remain.

== Famous magazines ==
- (A SUIVRE) (Casterman), English: TO BE CONTINUED
  - February 1, 1978 - December 1, 1997
- BoDoï (LZ Publications)
  - September 20, 1997 - still published
- Bravo (Jean Meewissen)
  - December 1940 - April 1951
- Canal BD Magazine (Canal BD)
  - October 1997 – Present. Still published.
- Charlie Hebdo (Editions du Square, Kalachnikof), English: Charlie Weekly
  - 1st run: November 1970 - December 1981; 2nd run: July 1992
- Charlie Mensuel (Editions du Square, Dargaud), English: Charlie Monthly
  - 1st run: February 1, 1969 - September 1, 1981; 2nd run: April 1, 1982 - February 1, 1986
- Circus (Glénat)
  - April 1, 1975 - September 1, 1989
- Coeurs Vaillants (UOCF), English: The Valiant Hearts
  - December 8, 1929 - October 1, 1963
- Corto (Casterman)
  - May 25, 1985 - November 20, 1989
- L'Écho des Savannes (Albin Michel), English: The Echo of the Savannahs
  - 1st run: May 1, 1972 - January 1, 1982; 2nd run: November 1, 1982 - December 1, 2006
- Ferraille (Les Requins-Marteaux)
  - October 1996–Present. Still (but irregularly) published.
- Fluide Glacial (Audie), English: Frozen Liquid
  - May 1, 1975 - still published
- Gomme!
  - November 15, 1981 - January 15, 1984
- Hara-Kiri (Editions du Square, SELD, Société Française de Revue)
  - Hara-Kiri Hebdo (weekly), 1st run: February 1969 - November 1970; 2nd run :1993; 3rd run: 1996
  - Hara-Kiri Mensuel (monthly), 1st run: September 1960 - December 1985; 2nd run: 1986 - 1987; 3rd run: 1988; 4th run: 1988 - 1990; 5th run: January -March 1993, 6th run: April 1996
- Héroïc Albums (Edition Esseo)
  - 1945- December 1956
- Le Journal de Mickey (Opera Mundi, Hachette)(English : Mickey's Newspaper) (Walt Disney's Comics and Stories French homologue)
  - 1st run: October 21, 1934 - July, 1944; 2nd run: June 1952
- Lanfeust Mag (Soleil Prod.)
  - May 1998–Present. Still published.
- Métal Hurlant (Les Humanoïdes Associés, Hachette), English: Screaming Metal
  - 1st run: January 1, 1975 - July 1, 1987; 2nd run: July 3, 2002 - October 3, 2004
- Pavillon Rouge (Editions Delcoutr), English: Red Pennant
  - May 2001 - July 2003
- Petits Belges (Editions Bonne Presse), English: Little Belgians
  - January 4, 1920 - December 4, 1960
- Pif gadget (Pif edition)
  - 1st run: February 1969 - January 1994; 2nd run: July 2004
- Le Petit Vingtième (Le Journal du Vingtième Siècle), English: literally The Little Twentieth, this was a children's offshoot of Le Journal du Vigntième Siècle, English: The Journal of the Twentieth Century
  - November 1, 1928 - May 9, 1940
- Pilote (Dargaud), English: Pilot
  - weekly: October 29, 1959 - May 30, 1974; monthly: June 5, 1974 - December 1, 1986
- Record (Bonne Presse, Bayard Presse)
  - 1st run: January, 1962 - December, 1971; 2nd run: January, 1972 - December, 1973; 3rd run: January 1974 - July 1976
- Spirou magazine (Dupuis)
  - April 21, 1938 - still published
- Tchô! (Glenat)
  - September 1998; monthly; still published
- Tintin magazine
  - Belgian edition: September 26, 1948 - December 23, 1980
  - French edition, 1st run: October 28, 1948 - January 4, 1973; 2nd run: September 16, 1975 - May 30, 1978; merged with Belgian edition
- Le Trombone Illustré (Spirou magazine supplement, Dupuis)
  - March 17, 1977 - October 20, 1977
- Vaillant (Éditions Vaillant)
  - June 1945 - February 1969; became Pif gadget
- Vécu (Glénat)
  - March 1, 1985 - still published
