= Édika =

French cartoonist (1940–2025)

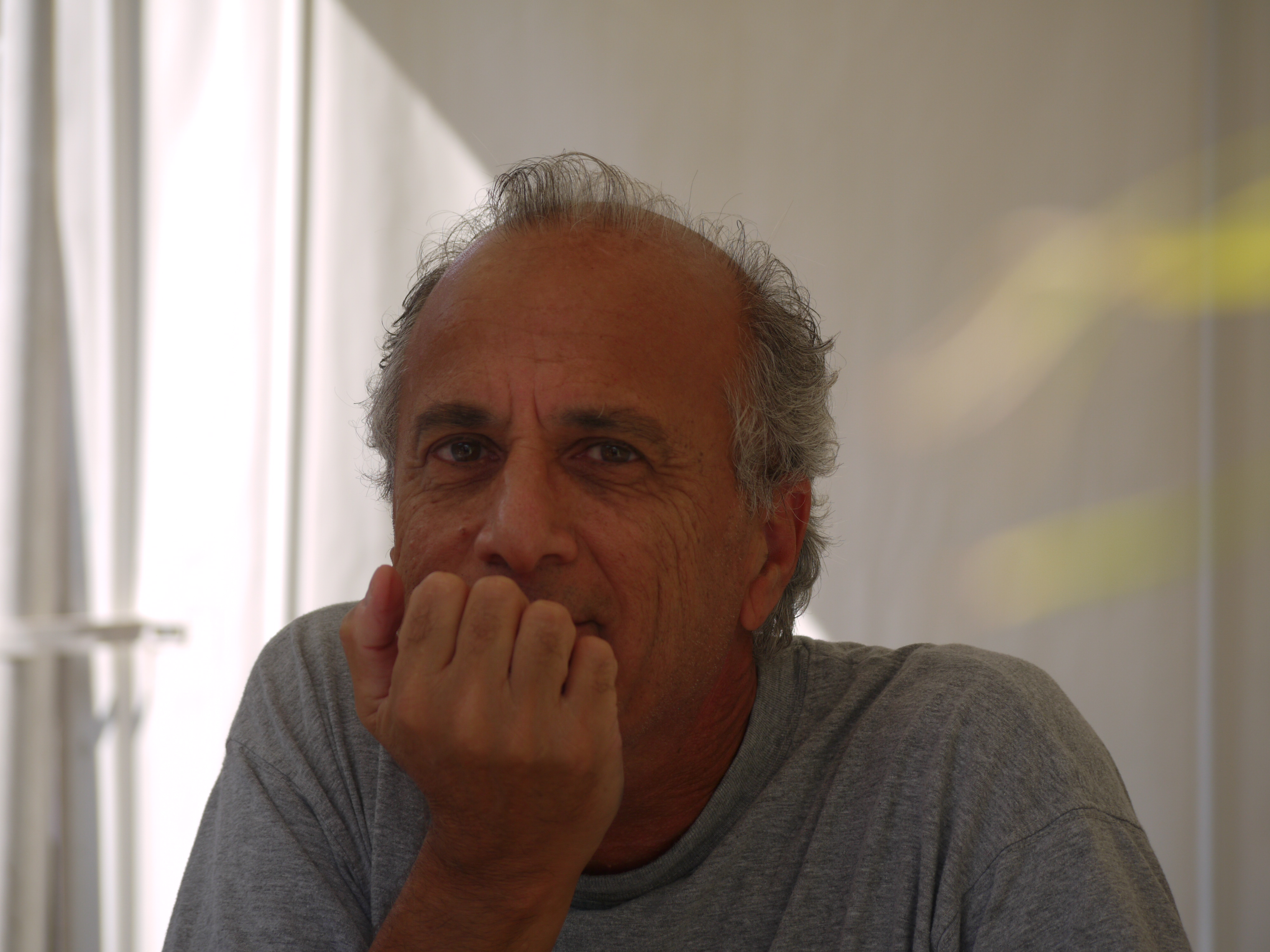
- Édika in 2009
- Born: Édouard Karali; 17 December 1940 Heliopolis, Cairo, Kingdom of Egypt
- Died: 16 December 2025 (aged 84) Rochefort-du-Gard, France
- Areas: Artist, writer
- Notable works: Pom-Pom Pidou-Waah (1996)

Édouard Karali (17 December 1940 – 16 December 2025), better known by the pen name of Édika, was a French comics artist who was renowned for his distinctively absurd style. A number of his comic strips have been translated into several European languages such as; English (published by Knockabout Comics), Spanish, Italian (in the magazine Totem comic), German (published by Alpha Comics), Swedish (published by Epix), Danish (published by Runepress), and Greek (in the magazines Vavel and Para Pente).

== Life and career ==
Initially working for the advertising industry in Egypt, he moved to France where his works were published in the Franco-Belgian comics magazines Pilote, Charlie Mensuel, and Psikopat, the magazine of his brother Paul Carali. A major milestone in his career as a comics artist was his cooperation with Gotlib, becoming a main contributor to the comics magazine Fluide Glacial.

Édika died on 16 December 2025, one day before his 85th birthday.

== Style ==
A typical Édika comics episode involves a plot structured in a complex and often inconsequential fashion, filled with verbose dialogues and a lot of meta-references. Most of those episodes do not have an ending.

Recurring characters are Bronski Proko and sometimes his family: wife Olga, kids Paganini (or just Nini) and Georges, and a speaking cat with an otherwise human behaviour, named Clarke Gaybeul (deliberately homophone to Clark Gable).

== Bibliography ==
- Edika publications in Fluide Glacial and Pilote – BDoubliées (in French)
- Edika albums – Bedetheque (in French)
