= Les Dingodossiers =

Series of comics

Les Dingodossiers is a satirical French comic series created by cartoonist Marcel Gotlib and writer René Goscinny, first published in Pilote magazine from 1965 to 1967. It is a parody of educational comics.

== Style ==
Art cover of the Integrale published by Dargaud in 2005

The term dingodossiers is a portmanteau of the two French words dingo or dingue ("mad") and dossiers. As the title suggests, the series is composed of didactic dossiers with a very humorous tone. Each story consists of two to four strips drawn in black and white. The strips deal with stereotypes and clichés and depict everyday life in a caricatured way. The stories are parodies and comic reports of scenes from marital and family life, work life, relations with neighbours, and holidays. A recurring character is Chaprot, a dunce pupil.

== Publication history ==
Marcel Gotlib and René Goscinny met in 1965 when Gotlib joined the Pilote magazine whose leader was Goscinny. Together they launched the Dingodossier series, with 169 stories published in Pilote between 1965 and 1967. In 1967 Goscinny, who had given up many series to become involved in the successful Asterix series, invited Gotlib to continue the series on his own. Gotlib decided to discontinue the series in 1968 and launched the series Rubrique-à-Brac, very similar to the Dingodossiers, but with a slightly different tone and some innovations. Gotlib declared that if the Dingodossiers series hadn't existed, maybe he would not have not created the RAB series.

Three albums were published by Dargaud: Les Dingodossiers Tome 1 in 1967 and Les Dingodossiers Tome 2 in 1972, then Les Dingodossiers Tome 3 in 1995 composed of previously unpublished strips. In 2005, a compendium was published by Dargaud.
