= Francis Masse =

French artist

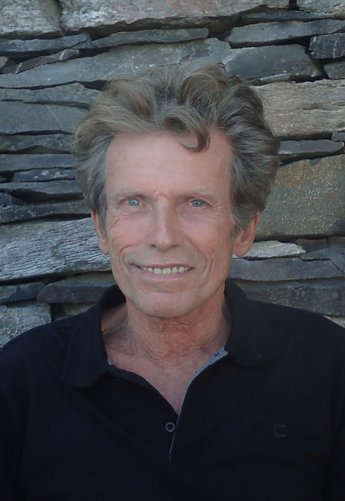
- Born: 21 August 1948 (age 78); Gap, Hautes-Alpes, France
- Occupations: Artist, graphic designer, cartoonist, sculptor, painter

Francis Masse, known as Masse (born 21 August 1948), is a French artist. In the early 1970s, he first became acquainted with his sculptures, then turned to animation and cartoons.

== Biography ==
After high school, Francis Masse studied at the art school of Nancy and then Grenoble, he made himself known first of all with his sculptures, it is an unknown aspect of his work, which nevertheless became his main activity again since the early 1990s. From the early 1970s, he made his first comics, including the Le Roi de le monde (English: The King of the World) published in Le Canard Sauvage in 1973.

Masse presents a graphic universe that embodies the post-1968 trend in the avant-garde press of the early 1970s.

=== Cartoons ===
Between 1970 and 72, he tackles animation in the association aaa (Atelier d'Animation d'Annecy) with the free jazz delirium of the Judgement Dernier and the hilarious Cagouince Migrateur. In 1973–74 with Pink Splash Production (created by Paul Dopff) known for his rather underground spirit, he directed Évasion Expresse, a short film combining animated paper cutting and cartoons on celluloid, integrated with the previous films in the program Dessins Animés et Cie screened for several weeks in 1974 at the Ciné-Halles in Paris.

In his report of the 1974 Grenoble festival, a critic of Art Vivant defined the style of Évasion Expresse of "Crumbian" graphics and splendidly black humor. Évasion Expresse tells the story of a man sitting on the window side in a train compartment and who lets himself go to a fantasized vision of an appearance in the scrolling landscape... up to a "apotheosis".

=== Comic strips ===
In parallel with his animations, Masse continues to make comic strips, first of all he participated to the fanzine of Poussin: Gonocoque (1973-1974). Since then, the important magazines at that time solicited him: Actuel, Le Canard Sauvage, L'Écho des Savanes, Charlie Mensuel, Zinc, Hara-Kiri, Métal Hurlant, Surprise and Fluide Glacial.

He published in Charlie #84 "Le Complot chromatique" (English: The Chromatic Plot), a quite long black and white story that tells the bursting in of a small bright pink detail.

His strips are grouped in albums: Masse at Éditions du Fromage in 1976, Mémoires d'Outre Terre at AUDIE the following year, two volumes of L'Encyclopédie de Masse and two volumes of On m'appelle l'Avalanche at Les Humanoïdes Associés in 1982 and 1983.

After the album Masse in the collection "30x40" of Futuropolis in 1985 and Les Dessous de la Ville at Hoëbeke in 1985, Casterman brings together in albums the strips of Les Deux du Balcon and then La Mare aux Pirates originally published in (À suivre) in 1985 and 1987.

In Les Deux du Balcon, two socially very different characters discourse on the great scientific theories that Masse distorts in order to propose his vision where poetry, fantasy, humor and nonsense mix with scientific rigor.

=== Culture ===
Philippe Ducat points out that Masse's "drame sombre" (English: dark hatch), is his level of culture. The scientific references he uses are unusual in the world of comics and are reserved for an informed readership. Ducat adds that innovative authors such as Winshluss, Trondheim, Killoffer, David B., Casanave, Blutch or Gerner consider Masse much more.

Ducat finds that there is some William Hogarth in Masse's work, they share the nonsense, the satire of society, the wry and biting humor. Masse draws on heavyweight coated paper and then scrubs out material, while Hogarth engraved on metal and then printed it. The Englishman confined his characters in a box to experiment on them, playing on space-time as in The False Perspective. Masse does the same, but to a higher degree.

Masse's work is often compared to Goya's one, caricature, causticity and satire are staged in nightmarish universes where fantasy reigns. According to Ducat, Masse's "cucurbitish" character recalls the satirical portraits published by André Gill in the satirical press of the Second Empire, his page layouts recall Little Nemo in Slumberland (1905–14) by Winsor McCay, the collages by Max Ernst, and the Imaginary Prisons of Giovanni Piranese (source claimed by Masse), he adds: This is simply a miracle.

=== Science ===
Masse, largely covers the scientific fields, especially since L'Encyclopédie de Masse (1982) and especially in Les Deux du Balcon (1985). Philippe Ducat evokes a logical connection with the "Science Amusante" of Tom Tit (1890), a work in which unnecessary experiments are illustrated with engravings at the limit of surrealism which inspired René Magritte, and according to Ducat, confines to the absurd, and compares him to Jean-Pierre Brisset and Gaston de Pawlowski with a humor close to Marcel Duchamp's one.

Jean-Marc Lévy-Leblond, physicist and director of the "Science Ouverte" collection at Le Seuil, welcomes Masse's desire to disseminate scientific knowledge in an absolutely new form from a science amateur, in the noblest sense of the term and explains that Masse pulls his inspiration from references and authorities such as Jouvet, Gould, Ruelle or Aspect, and that this guarantee is necessary to support Masse's crazy vision of contemporary science. According to him, Masse demonstrates the underlying scientific truth, since he points out that science progresses by freeing from common sense. He adds that admiring science must not prevent from amusing oneself and that there is room for a merry knowledge. He ends by saying that Masse brings opening thanks to a new scenography which releases from both flat illustration and dubious metaphor.

During his interview with Masse at the festival Formula Bula in 2015, the physicist Étienne Klein draws a parallel between the work of Masse and the popularization work of the physicist George Gamow who, through his character Mr Tompkins, explains with a whimsical humour the great scientific theories.

The cosmologist Jean-Philippe Uzan pays tribute to him at the conference "La Cosmologie en Bande Dessinée" (English: The Cosmology in Comic Strip) (2011), referring to Alfred Jarry, he describes the album (Vue d'artiste) as an innovative "pataphore" and he proposes to symbolically award Masse the title of Doctor of Pataphysics from the University of Paris VI, with his unanimous congratulations.

The mathematician Cédric Villani for the release of his album "Les Rêveurs lunaires" (English: The Moon Dreamers) quotes his reference comics authors and named Masse in his personal four aces of great founding authors still alive with Baudoin, Bourgeon, and Tardi. He describes the Masse's universe rather confusing at first, but advises that we are largely rewarded for efforts when diving into and adds that On m'appelle l'Avalanche is certainly a major work of the ninth art.

=== From reality to nonsense ===
In a discussion reported by Gabrielle Lefevre, Masse defined his approach and his humor saying the work of the artist is to give a representation of reality, as the scientist does, and the two approaches complement each other and clarifying: Obviously, I am freer than the scientist! I am only bound to poetry. He points out that, when a scientist makes an effort to popularize, he is obliged to use parables, it sometimes becomes just as in Prévert. According to him, the description of the reality can only pass through humor, because humor is the grammar of what means several things at the same time.

Vincent Baudoux speaks of the apparent "non-sens" (i.e. no sense) of Masse and prefers the English term "nonsense" by referring to Robert Benayoun (Les dingues du Nonsense, Baland, 1984), who considers nonsense to be the logic extrapolated up to absurdity, while the French term of "non-sens" translates the absence of logic.

The term "nonsense" is the most suitable for defining the work of Masse, this is why he is more appreciated by a readership open to the Anglo-Saxon culture.

For example, when Terry Gilliam, the American Monty Python, released his film Brazil, he told to Libération that amongst his stated influences figure Goya, the American underground comics and French comics, with a rare admiration for Masse: Fabulous ! I would love to make a film with him, and he still amazes me.

Similarly, in an interview with the magazine Les Inrockuptibles, Art Spiegelman quotes Masse before Crumb and Tardi by saying that what he did was incredible, his work is important and very much underestimated. In this paper, Masse's style is described as strips stripped with the steel wool of a funny cynicism.

=== Masse and the world of comics ===
Although Masse has published in numerous magazines and produced about twenty albums, it has never aroused the enthusiasm of the public usually fond of comics, nevertheless his work is often acclaimed by the critic and by artists who quote him as a reference.

For Willem, Masse was in 1982 the greatest. Thierry Groensteen evokes in 1984 the "massolatry" reigning within the team of the Cahiers de la Bande Dessinée.

It is written in La lettre des Sables d'Olonne that Masse is unique, his universe is dark and fantastic, the author points out that Masse is the first, and still the only one, having dealt with scientific problems in the comic strip with seriousness and fantasy, he describes the style as intelligent popularization, and it is a rather entertaining and rather underestimated genre, while explaining that his writing is close to Raymond Queneau or Marcel Aymé: One must read him as an author.

Benoît Gilles says that Masse is recognized as one of the precursors of the new freedoms of the comic strip.

At the Angoulême Festival 2012, Art Spiegelman presents Masse as one of the prominent figures in his now-legendary New Yorker journal RAW.

In 2007, the museum of Sainte-Croix Abbey in Sables d'Olonne organizes a retrospective of Masse's comics and animated films as well as an exhibition of his sculptures. The Association reissues On m'appelle l'Avalanche. Le Seuil publishes L'Art Attentat, a collection of old strips colorized by Pakito Bolino. The Dernier Cri publishes Tsunami au musée a snakes and ladders limited edition game. From February to April 2009, he appeared with Stéphane Blanquet, Gilbert Shelton, Joost Swarte and Chris Ware in the exhibition Quintet at the Contemporary Art Museum in Lyon. Since 2011, he begins to reissue his albums as well as original works at Glénat. At the end of 2014, a new Encyclopédie de Masse is reissued, with more than fifty entirely new strips, humor drawings and never-reissued strips, the artist redrawn many strips and rewrote the dialogs.

== Filmography ==
- 14 juillet, 1971. Realised in pixilation.
- Le Cagouince Migrateur (English: Migrant Loo), 1971.
- Le Jugement Dernier (English: Last Judgment), 1972.
- Évasion Expresse (English: Express Escape), 1973. Broadcast at the show Pop2 of ORTF on Saturday 3 November 1973.
- Le Clap (English: The Clapperboard), 1973. Originally made for a film based on exquisite corpse principle and realized by a collective of authors.
- La première ascension du Mont Blanc par un Français (English: The first ascension of Mont Blanc by a Frenchman), 1974. Rushes of 20 minutes exist for this film produced by Cinémation and broadcast in the 1970s in a Michel Lancelot's show.
- Chimère (English: Chimera), 1986. A 4 minutes short film.
- La Loi du chaos (English: The Chaos Law), 2002. Original script (graphical and show bible) for 26 episodes created by Masse for an animated TV show.

== Publications ==
List extracted from the detailed bibliography.

=== Magazines ===
- French: Gonocoque, 1973–1974.
- French: Zinc, Le POP, 1973–1974.
- French: Actuel, Novapress, 1973–1974.
- French: Le Canard Sauvage, Glénat, 1973–1974.
- French: Zeno, Le bourricot magique, circa 1975.
- French: Newlife, Newlife Éditions, circa 1975.
- French: Fantasmagorie, Glénat, 1974–1976.
- French: L'Écho des savanes, Éditions du Fromage, 1974–1977.
- French: Charlie Mensuel, Éditions du Square, 1974–1976.
- French: La Gueule ouverte, Éditions du Square, 1975–1976.
- French: Hara-Kiri, Éditions du Square, 1975–1976, 1985.
- French: Surprise, Éditions du Square, 1976.
- French: BD Éditions du Square, 1978.
- French: Fluide glacial, AUDIE, 1975–1978, 2017–2018.
- French: Métal hurlant, Les Humanoïdes Associés, 1975–1977, 1980–1987.
- English: RAW, Françoise Mouly & Art Spiegelman, 1982–1985.
- Spanish: El Vibora, La Cúpula, 1982.
- Dutch: Zwaar Metal, Dutch edition of Métal hurlant, 1982–1983.
- French: Viper, Sinsemilla Éditions, 1984.
- French: Rigolo, Les Humanoïdes Associés, 1984.
- French: Zoulou, Novapress, 1984.
- Danish: Total Metal, Danish edition of Métal hurlant, 1984–1986.
- Swedish: Epix, Swedish edition of Métal hurlant, Tryckt hos Vaasa, circa 1984–1986.
- French: L'Intox, SHIFT Éditions, 1985.
- French: Hebdogiciel, SHIFT Éditions, 1985–1986.
- French: Marcel, SEH (SHIFT Éditions), 1986.
- French: Le Lynx, AANAL, 1986.
- French: Le Petit Journal de Télérama, parisian supplement to Télérama, 1983–1985.
- French: À Suivre, Casterman, 1982–1990.
- Greek: ΠΑΡΑ ΠΕΝΤΕ, Para Pente publishing, 1987–1988.
- German: U-Comix, Alpha-Comic Verlag, 1987.
- Italian: Dolce vita, GEDIT spa, 1989.
- English: RAW V2, Françoise Mouly & Art Spiegelman, 1991.
- French: Le Petit Psikopat, section La gazette du Midi Viticole.
- French: Fluide glacial, AUDIE, Série OR #80 dated 20 September 2017, #81 dated 21 December 2017, #82 dated 21 March 2018, #85 dated 20 December 2018.
- French: Spirou, Dupuis, Spirou vs. Fluide Glacial, #4195 dated 9 May 2018.

=== Albums ===
- French: F. Masse, Éditions du Fromage, coll. "L'Écho des Savanes présente", 1976.
- French: Mémoires d'outre-terre (English: Memories of Land Overseas), AUDIE, coll. "Fluide Glacial", 1977.
- French: Encyclopédie de Masse, Les Humanoïdes Associés :
1. Volume 1 : A-H, 1982.
2. Volume 2 : I-Z, 1982.
- French: On m'appelle l'Avalanche (English: They Call Me The Avalanche), Les Humanoïdes Associés :
1. On m'appelle l'Avalanche : Volume 1, 1983.
2. On m'appelle l'Avalanche : Volume 2, 1983.
  - Reissue in one single volume, L'Association, 2007.
- French: Masse, Futuropolis, coll. "30 x 40", 1985.
- French: Les Dessous de la ville (English: Lower Parts of the City), Hoëbeke, 1985.
- French: Les Deux du Balcon (English: The Two Guys on the Balcony), Casterman, coll. "Studio (A Suivre)", 1985. Reissue Glénat, coll. "1000 feuilles", 2011.
- French: La Mare aux Pirates (English: The Pond with the Pirates), Casterman, coll. "Studio (A Suivre)", 1987. Reissue Glénat, coll. "1000 feuilles", 2013.
- French: Tsunami au musée, Le Dernier Cri, 2007.
- French: Cahier de l'Abbaye Sainte-Croix, les trames sombres de Masse, Le Dernier Cri, 2007.
- French: L'Art attentat, Le Seuil, 2007.
- French: (Vue d'artiste) (English: (Artist's impression)), Glénat, coll. "1000 feuilles", 2011.
- French: Contes de Noël, Glénat, coll. "1000 feuilles", 2012. Reissue of Masse in "30x40" with an additional story "Les pommes" (English: The Apples).
- French: Le Modèle Standard, "With English Subtitles", Le Chant des muses, coll. "Zorro Zébré", 2012.
- French: Elle, L'Association, coll. "Espôlette", 2014.
- French: La Nouvelle Encyclopédie de Masse : A-M, Glénat, coll. "1000 feuilles", 2014.
- French: La Nouvelle Encyclopédie de Masse : N-Z, Glénat, coll. "1000 feuilles", 2015.
- French: Les deux du Dock, Galerie Dock Sud, 2015.
- French: La Minute de Silence, Super Loto Éditions, coll. "Banco", 2015.
- French: La Dernière Séance, L'Association, coll. "Patte de mouche", 2016.
