= F'Murr =

Comic creator (1946–2018)

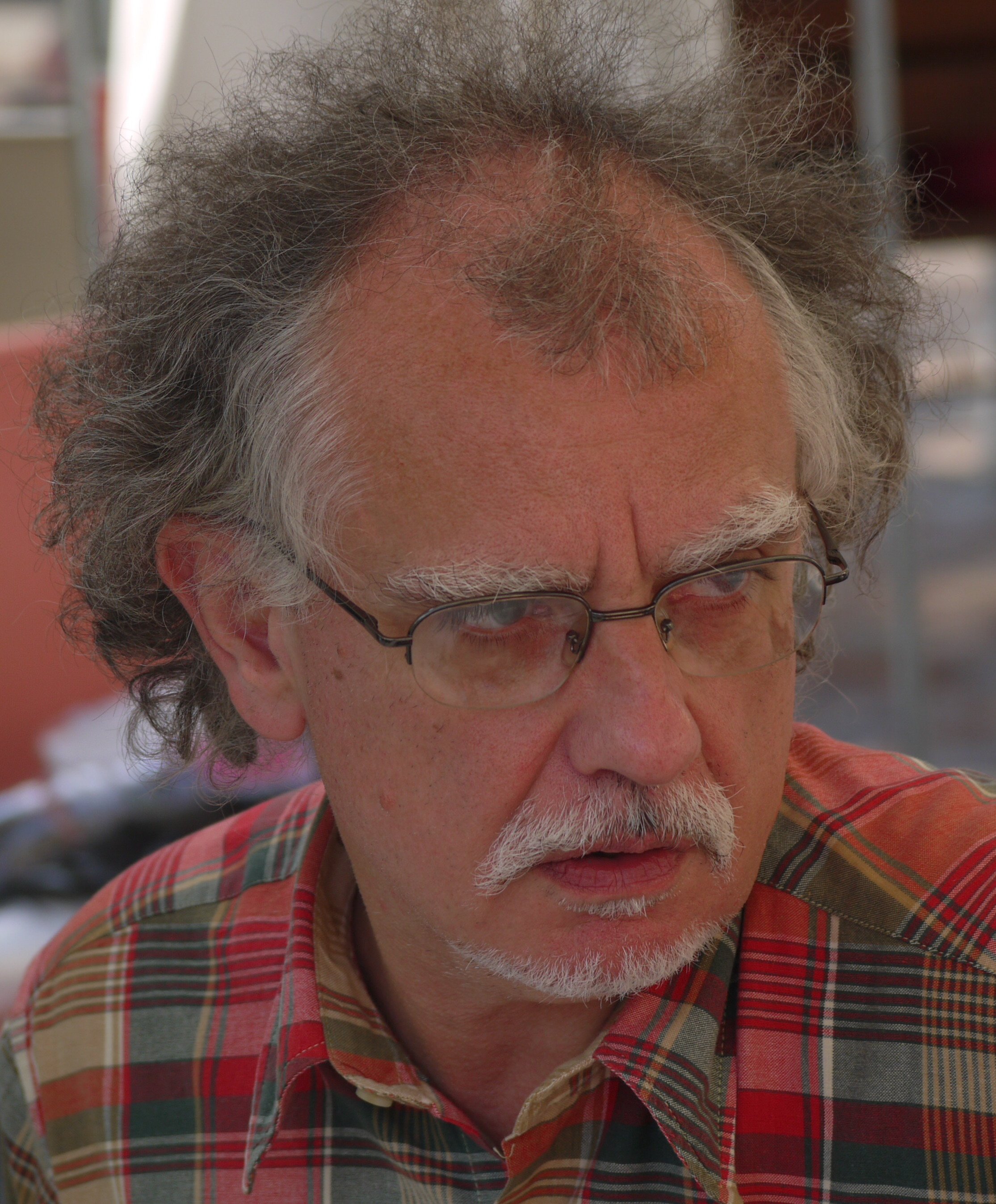
- F'Murr in 2009
- Born: Richard Peyzaret; March 31, 1946 Paris, France
- Died: April 10, 2018 (aged 72) Paris, France
- Areas: Artist, writer
- Pseudonym: F'Murr
- Notable works: Le Génie des alpages Jehanne d'Arc; Tartine de clous Le char de l'état dérape sur le sentier de la guerre
- Awards: Full list

Richard Peyzaret (March 31, 1946 – April 10, 2018), better known by his pen name F'Murrr or F'Murr, was a French cartoonist and comic book writer. He was most famous for the long-running series Le Génie des alpages (The Genius of the Mountain Pastures).

== Biography ==
Cartoon by F'Murr

Peyzaret grew up as an admirer of Hergé and André Franquin, but studied Applied Arts for six years in Paris before meeting the BD industry, by arriving at the workshop of Raymond Poïvet. This led to an introduction to René Goscinny and starting work for Pilote magazine in 1971, making his debut with the gags series Contes à Rebours. The unused boards of this strip later formed the basis of his first album, Au loup!.

While at Pilote, he began his most famous work, Le Génie des alpages in 1973. This series features an old and a young shepherd, their talking shepherd's dog, a flock of mad sheep and other abnormal characters behaving unpredictably in alpine surroundings. When Pilote ceased publication, the series were issued directly into albums.

He also held a long associations with several of the other francophone serial magazines of this period. Naphtalène was also published in Pilote, Porfirio et Gabriel in Le Canard Sauvage and Circus, Jehanne d'Arc in Métal Hurlant, Robin des Boîtes in Fluide Glacial, and Les Mirrois de Marguerite and Ala et Lolli were created for the Spirou magazine supplement Le Trombone Illustré.

In 1985 he began the strip Histoires Déplacées in (À SUIVRE) satirizing the ongoing Soviet occupation of Afghanistan. These were collected in the 1987 album named Le char de l'état dérape sur le sentier de la guerre (The State's Tank Slips on the Path of War).

A few instances of F'Murrr translated into the English language were printed in Heavy Metal and National Lampoon magazine in the late 70s.

Eight albums of Le Genie des Alpages were published in Norway in the 1980s by A/S Hjemmet-Serieforlaget under the name of Ullkorn, which is a pun on "gullkorn", a Norwegian word for aphorism - i.e. corn being found as gold (gull), or in this instance, wool (ull).

The first four albums of "Le Genie des Alpages" were published in Denmark in the 1980s by Serieforlaget under the name of "Fårfængelighedens marked", which is a pun on "får", the name for sheep, and "Forfængelighedens marked" (Vanity Fair).

== Awards ==
- 1978: Angoulême International Comics Festival, Best Comic Book for Barre-toi de mon herbe
- 1991: Angoulême International Comics Festival, Humour Award for Le pauvre chevalier

== Bibliography ==
- Au loup! (1974, Minoustchine/Dargaud, ISBN 2-205-04263-7)
- Le Génie des alpages, (1976, Dargaud, ISBN 2-205-00881-1)
- Le Génie des alpages #2, Comme des bêtes, (1976, Dargaud, ISBN 2-205-00892-7)
- Le Génie des alpages #3, Barre-toi de mon herbe, (1977, Dargaud, ISBN 2-205-01155-3)
- Le Génie des alpages #4, Un grand silence frisé, (1978, Dargaud, ISBN 2-205-01238-X)
- Vingt dieux c'est le synode (1979, Artefact, ISBN 2-86697-004-7)
- Le Génie des alpages #5, Les Intondables, (1980, Dargaud, ISBN 2-205-01596-6)
- Jehanne d'Arc #1, Jehanne au pied du mur, (1980, Casterman, ISBN 2-203-33404-5)
- Le Génie des alpages #6, Hi-Yo c'est l'écho, (1981, Dargaud, ISBN 2-205-01922-8)
- Porfirio et Gabriel (1980, Futuropolis, ISBN 2-7376-5374-6)
- Tartine de clous (1981, Dargaud, ISBN 2-205-02343-8)
- Le Génie des alpages #7, Tonnerre... et mille sabots!, (1983, Dargaud, ISBN 2-205-02490-6)
- Jehanne d'Arc #2, Tim Galère, (1985, Casterman, ISBN 2-203-33424-X)
- Robin des boites (1985, Futuropolis, ISBN 2-7376-5450-5)
- Le Génie des alpages #8, Dans les nuages, (1987, Dargaud, ISBN 2-205-02764-6)
- Le char de l'état dérape sur le sentier de la guerre (1987, Casterman, ISBN 2-203-33434-7)
- Spirella mangeuse d'écureuils (1988, Khani éditions, ISBN 2-907159-01-1)
- Le Génie des alpages #9, Après nous... le déluge?, (1989, Dargaud, ISBN 2-205-03618-1)
- Le pauvre chevalier (1990, Casterman, ISBN 2-203-34804-6)
- Le Génie des alpages #10, Monter, descendre, ça glisse pareil, (1992, Dargaud, ISBN 2-205-03919-9)
- Les aveugles (1992, Casterman, ISBN 2-203-34807-0)
- Le Génie des alpages #11, Sabotage et paturage, (1995, Dargaud, ISBN 2-205-04253-X)
- Le Génie des alpages #12, Bouge tranquille!, (1998, Dargaud, ISBN 2-205-04591-1)
- Éloge de la pentitude (2002, Glénat, ISBN 2-7234-3725-6)
- Le Génie des alpages #13, Cheptel Maudit, (2004, Dargaud, ISBN 2-205-04887-2)
- Le Génie des alpages #14, ... Courent dans la montagne, (2007, Dargaud, ISBN)
