= Nikita Mandryka =

French cartoonist (1940–2021)

Mandryka
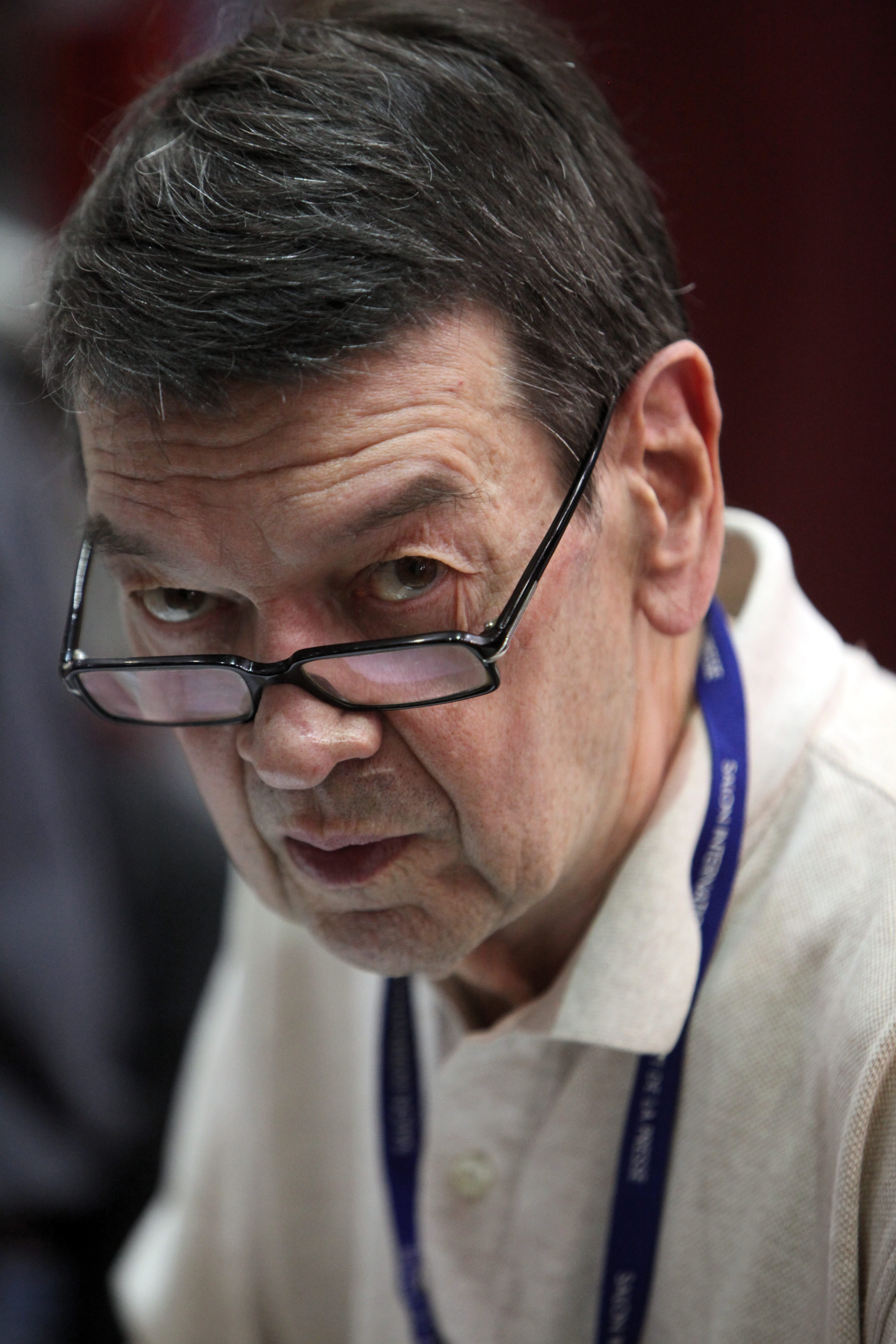
- Born: 20 October 1940 Bizerte, French Tunisia
- Died: 14 June 2021 (aged 80) Geneva, Switzerland
- Areas: artist, writer
- Pseudonyms: Nik, Kalkus, Karl Kruss, Caleq-usse, Calgus, Kilkoz
- Notable works: Le Concombre Masqué; Les Minuscules; Les Clopinettes
- Awards: see #Awards

Nikita Mandryka (20 October 1940 – 13 June 2021) was a French comics artist.

He started drawing in the Vaillant magazine, before moving to Pilote in 1967, and then created L'Écho des savanes along with Claire Bretécher and Marcel Gotlib in 1972. He left this magazine in 1979, going back to Pilote as editorial director. His major and better known works are Le Concombre Masqué (The Masked Cucumber) stories. He won the Grand Prix de la ville d'Angoulême in 1994.

== Awards and honors ==
- 1988: Angoulême International Comics Festival Award for Best Promotional Comic
- 1994: Grand Prix de la ville d'Angoulême
- 2005: Angoulême International Comics Festival Award for Inheritance
- Asteroid 157747 Mandryka is named after Nikita Mandryka.

== Works ==
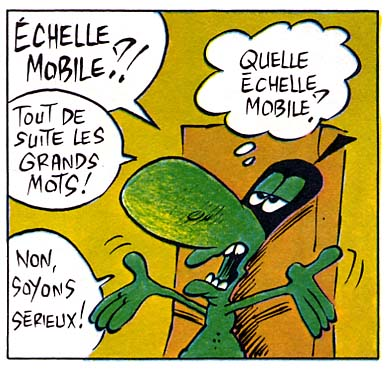
Le Concombre Masqué

- Les aventures potagères du Concombre masqué (from 1975 to 2006).
- Clopinettes (drawing), with Gotlib (story), Dargaud, 1974.
- Mandryka, Éditions du Fromage, 1976.
- Le retour du refoulé, Éditions du Fromage, 1977, coll. « L'Écho des Savanes ».
- Les Minuscules, Éditions du Fromage :
1. Entre chien et chat, 1979.
- Lob de la Jungle (drawing), with Jacques Lob (story), Les Humanoïdes Associés, 1980.
- Alice (story), with Riverstone (drawing), Dargaud, 1985.
- Le type au Reuri, Albin Michel, 1987.
- La Horde - Mandryka chez Freud, Z'éditions, 1994.
- Les animaux sont-ils des bêtes ? (drawing), with Fritax (story), P&T Production, 1995.
- Y'a plus de limites !, Albin Michel, 1996.
- Les Gardiens du Maser (story), with Massimiliano Frezzato (story and drawing), Éditions USA :

4. La Tour de Fer, 2000.
5. Le Bout du Monde, 2003.
6. Le Village Perdu, 2005.
