= Hamster Jovial =

French comics series

- Author(s): Marcel Gotlib
- Current status/schedule: Terminated
- Launch date: December 1971
- End date: June 1974
- Syndicate(s): Rock & Folk, Fluide Glacial
- Genre(s): Black comedy, satire, rock music-themed comics

Hamster Jovial or Hamster Jovial et les louveteaux was a French comics series created by Marcel Gotlib about a scoutsleader and his three young cubs. It ran between December 1971 and June 1974 in the French music magazine Rock & Folk. Reprints also appeared in Fluide Glacial.

== Concept ==
Hamster Jovial is a tall, naïve scouts leader who is passionate about pop music. He always tries to inspire his young scouts (two boy scouts, one girl) with moralistic life lessons and by teaching them to sing along songs with him, but none of them care. The comic strip was controversial for frequently making risqué jokes, particularly involving the sexual antics of the little girl scout and her boyfriend. Gotlib furthermore made a lot of references to rock artists who were popular around the time these comics were published, from Frank Zappa, Pink Floyd over The Who to Tina Turner. In one series of gags he had Hamster Jovial parody famous album covers.

== Albums ==
- Hamster Jovial et ses Louveteaux (1977).
