= Gai-Luron =

Introduction of Gai Luron from an origin panel.

Gai-Luron is a French comics series about a melancholic Basset Hound, Gai-Luron, created on 12 July 1964 by Gotlib. Originally published in the Franco-Belgian comics magazines Vaillant and Pif Gadget, the character joined Nanar, Jujube et Piette, which Gotlib had drawn since 1962, but eventually headlined a hit series of its own. The album collection series started in 1975, and the second album, Gai-Luron en écrase méchamment was awarded the prize for French comical work at the Angoulême in 1976.

== Synopsis ==
It follows the anthropomorphic dog Gai-Luron (whose name can be roughly translated as "Jolly Fellow", which contrasts with Gai-Luron's generally apathetic behaviour), his girlfriend Belle-Lurette and his friend Jujube the fox.

The plot sometimes involves Gai-Luron and Jujube reading their fan mail, which is almost always written by the same reader, a little boy named Jean-Pierre Liégeois, or else a friend or relative of his.

== Bibliography ==
Gai-Luron's adventures were published in 10 volumes between 1975 and 1982, and a last one, La bataille navale...ou Gai-Luron en slip, was published as Gotlib's goodbye to the comic strip scene in 1986.

- Gai-Luron, collection Les Rois du rire n°10 (1969, Éditions Vaillant)
- 1: Gai-Luron ou la joie de vivre (1975, Audie)
- 2: Gai-Luron en écrase méchamment (1975, Audie)
- 3: Gai-Luron rit de se voir beau en ce miroir (1976, Audie)
- 4: Gai-Luron et Jean-Pierre Liegeois (1976, Audie)
- 5: Gai-Luron fait rien qu'à copier (1977, Audie)
- 6: Gai-Luron ce héros au sourire si doux (1978, Audie)
- 7: Gai-Luron s'en tire par une pirouette (1979, Audie)
- 8: Gai-Luron drague comme une bête (1980, Audie)
- 9: Gai-Luron n'engendre pas la mélancolie ! (1981, Audie)
- 10: Gai-Luron tire une tronche pas possible (1982, Audie)
- La bataille navale ou Gai-Luron en slip (1986, Audie)
