= Angoulême International Comics Festival Best promotional comic =

Former comics award at the Angoulême festival

This Prize for best promotional comic is awarded to comics at the Angoulême International Comics Festival from 1986 to 1992, and again since 2003. It is intended to crown the best communication campaign supported by comics of the past year. As is the customary practice in Wikipedia for listing awards such as Oscar results, the winner of the award for that year is listed first, the others listed below are the nominees.

== 1980s ==
- 1986: Lutte contre le vandalisme dans les cabines publiques by Frank Margerin
- 1987: Felix et le bus, collaboration
- 1988: Pas de sida pour Miss Poireau by Mandryka and Claude Moliterni
- 1989: La Var, le département dont vous êtres le héros by Floc'h and Fromental
  - Special mention for Vae Victis, la BD derrière les barreaux by Didier Savard

== 1990s ==
- 1990: Un arbre n’est pas une ville by Fromental and Floc'h
- 1991: Rires et chansons by Vuillemin
  - Special mention for Egoïste by Jacques Tardi
- 1992: Hergée
  - Special mention for Dossier de Chanel by Pierre Le-Tan
- (1993: no award in this category)
- (1994: no award in this category)
- (1995: no award in this category)
- (1996: no award in this category)
- (1997: no award in this category)
- (1998: no award in this category)
- (1999: no award in this category)

== 2000s ==
- (2000: no award in this category)
- (2001: no award in this category)
- (2002: no award in this category)
- 2003: Les Eaux Blessées by Dominique David, Cristina Cuadra and Rudi Miel, for the European Parliament
- 2004: Changeons de regard. Faut pô avoir peur by Zep for the city of Angoulême and Handicap International
- 2005: 24 heures sous tension by Denis Bodart (artist) and Périé and Mykaïa (authors) for Pfizer
- (2006: no award in this category)
