= Daniel Goossens =

French comics artist (born 1954)

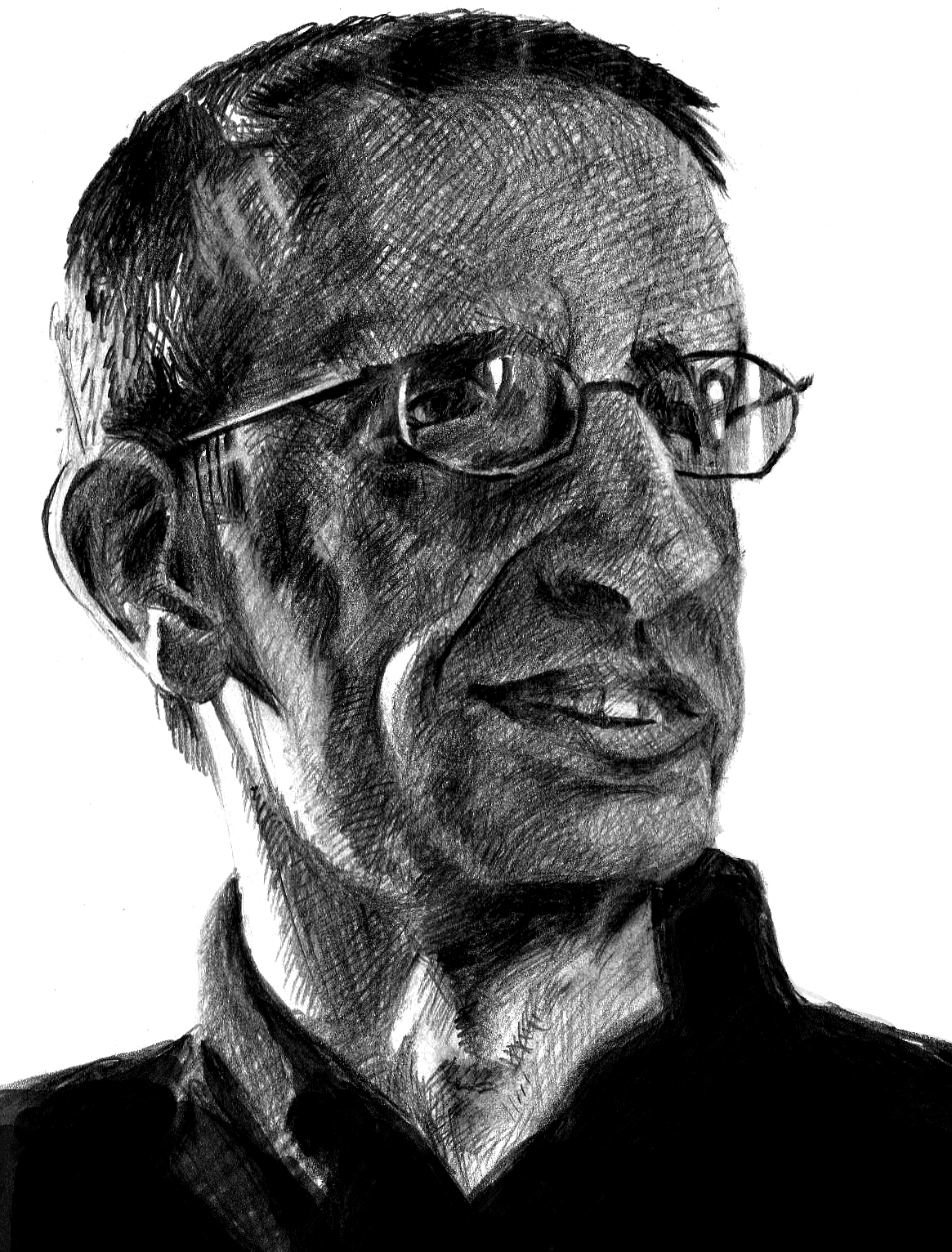
- Portrait of Daniel Goossens
- Born: May 16, 1954 (age 72) Salon-de-Provence, Provence-Alpes-Côte d'Azur, France
- Areas: Comics artist, lecturer, and researcher in artificial intelligence
- Awards: Grand Prix de la ville d'Angoulême (1997)

Daniel Goossens (born 16 May 1954 in Salon-de-Provence) is a French comics artist.

== Biography ==
Goossens began his career in the magazine Pionniers. After a short spell at Pilote magazine, he began contributing to the monthly magazine Fluide Glacial in 1977, and became one of its authors. Later, his work also appeared in Le Petit Psikopat Illustré (ancestor of current Psikopat) and Rigolo.

Apart from his work with comic strips, Daniel Goossens is a lecturer and researcher in artificial intelligence at the University of Paris VIII.

Goossens was awarded the Grand Prix de la ville d'Angoulême in 1997.

== Style ==
Goossens' comics are built on a clash between semi-realistic art and surreal content. He relishes regurgitating clichéd situations from literature, film and television, and introducing odd twists. (His classic Route vers l'enfer book is a war film pastiche starring Father Christmas.) Particular attention is paid to dialogues, which often drag on past all logic, and include much stuttering, mumbling and other noises rendered phonetically. Most of his comic books are collections of short stories, with a loose common thread. Like his mentor Gotlib, Goossens has also often used a mock-encyclopedic tone. Goossens' inquiry on absurd does not refrain from astonishing scenes that some may find disturbing - such as a gang of children stoning Father Christmas, or an infant Albert Einstein tossing an eye out of a bully at the kindergarten, or a mother requiring consulting the doctor for basic practical wisdom until she finally brings her baby's skeleton.
