= The Frenchman's Son =

- Directed by: Gérard Lauzier
- Written by: Gérard Lauzier
- Produced by: Jean-Louis Livi; Liz Mago Bosch; Bernard Marescot
- Starring: Fanny Ardant; Josiane Balasko
- Cinematography: Robert Alazraki
- Edited by: Georges Klotz
- Music by: Vladimir Cosma
- Production companies: TF1 Films Production; Cofimage 10; Film Par Film; TPS Cinéma
- Distributed by: Pathé Distribution
- Release date: 15 December 1999
- Running time: 107 minutes
- Country: France
- Language: French
- Budget: $17.1 million
- Box office: $4 million

The Frenchman's Son or Le fils du Français is a 1999 French comedy-adventure film directed by Gérard Lauzier.

== Plot ==
Since the death of his mother, nine-year-old Benjamin has lived in Paris with his grandmothers, Anne and Suzanne. They can't stand each other and are very different. Anne is a wealthy, cultured singing teacher, while Suzanne, a janitor, smokes a lot, steals from people and likes to cheat at poker. Meanwhile, Benjamin's father Christian is in South America, where he has been prospecting for gold for two years.

One day Benjamin receives a letter from his father inviting him to live with him in Brazil. His grandmothers, who are always fighting, travel with Benjamin. When they arrive at Christian's house in Brazil, there is no trace of him. Benjamin finally admits that shortly before they left, he received a call from his father saying that he had to cancel the meeting. They finally learn from a neighbour that Christian went to a small village, Santa Rita. But when Benjamin, Anne and Suzanne arrive there, they only find Christian's assistant Jean. He tells them that Christian had to suddenly leave for Paris without explaining the details to him so as not to endanger him unnecessarily.

Two armed men try to kidnap Benjamin, and his grandmothers manage to prevent this. The Parisians flee into the Brazilian jungle together with Jean. On their way through the jungle, they meet indigenous people who invite them to their village. Their chief likes Suzanne and wants to marry her. The following morning, the four French sneak out of the village and head back into the jungle. On the way they are found by Aureliano, a landowner, and his daughter Iracema. Aureliano takes them to his country house and proves to be a generous host, who is also a passionate singer. As he practices opera arias on the piano with Anne, they become close. Soon, armed groups of indigenous people arrive. Benjamin, Jean, Anne and Suzanne have to flee once again. However, the helicopter that is supposed to bring them to safety belongs to their pursuers, who previously wanted to kidnap Benjamin. The French are taken to a drug cartel's base and held there in captivity.

They are rescued when the Brazilian army attacks the base. The cartel's bosses take the French hostage, but are killed by the indigenous village chief who followed them. As it turns out, Christian had witnessed a murder by the drug mafia and reported it to the police. The police arrested him for alleged diamonds smuggling, so the drug dealers could not kill him. Instead, they wanted to silence him by kidnapping his son. When Christian is released from prison, Benjamin, Anne, Suzanne, Jean and Aureliano are waiting for him in a car. They drive away together.

== Cast ==
- Fanny Ardant as Anne
- Josiane Balasko as Suzanne
- David-Alexandre Parquier as Benjamin
- Thierry Frémont as Jean
- Luca Barbareschi as Aureliano
- George Aguilar as Indian Chief
- Daniel Ceccaldi as Monsieur Oliver
- Fanny Valette as Iracema
- Ralph Kinnard as Jean
- Eric Boucher as Christian Laviel
- Cyrille Bonnet as Marcel

== Around the movie ==
This is on the set of the movie that Josiane Balasko met her future husband George Aguilar. They married in 2003.
