= Le Génie des alpages =

French comic book series

Le Génie des alpages is a French humoristic comic book series by F'Murr. The series first appeared in Pilote magazine on January 11, 1973. In 1976 Les Éditions Dargaud started publication of hardcover albums.

== Synopsis ==
The short stories are usually told in one-page segments, and unpredictably follow the lives of the series' cast. This includes the old nameless shepherd, his successor, the young Athanase Percevalve, the Dog Without a Name (an intellectual talking shepherd's dog), and a flock of eccentric, verbal sheep, led by Romuald the black ram. Other unorthodox characters appear, such as the Berthold the stupid St. Bernhard, Kattarsis the petite self-conscious sphinx, a lion, a fox, eagles, snakes, and "Death" in the shape of an attractive woman. Some of these recur frequently.

There is usually no apparent plot in these stories. Instead, they often consist of different dialogues and simultaneous happenings. Nevertheless, F'murr maintains a sense of direction and realism in his universe, and somewhere in between is the humour that his fans find hilarious but inexplicable.

== Bibliography ==
Le Génie des Alpages No.1 (1976)

1. Le Génie des alpages (Genius of the Mountain Pastures) (1976, ISBN 2-205-00881-1)
2. Comme des bêtes (Like the Beasts) (1976, ISBN 2-205-00892-7)
3. Barre-toi de mon herbe (Keep off My Grass) (1977, ISBN 2-205-01155-3)
4. Un grand silence Frisé (A Big Woolly Silence) (1978, ISBN 2-205-01238-X)
5. Les Intondables (The Unshaveables) (1980, ISBN 2-205-01596-6)
6. Hi-Yo c'est l'écho (Hey-Ho It's the Echo) (1981, ISBN 2-205-01922-8)
7. Tonnerre & mille sabots (Thunder & Thousand Hooves) (1983, ISBN 2-205-02490-6)
8. Dans les nuages (In the Clouds) (1987, ISBN 2-205-02764-6)
9. Après nous le déluge (After Us, the Flood) (1989, ISBN 2-205-03618-1)
10. Monter, descendre, ça glisse pareil (Climbing, Descending, Slipping Anyway) (1992, ISBN 2-205-03919-9)
11. Sabotage et paturage (Sabotage and Pastures) (1995, ISBN 2-205-04253-X)
12. Bouge tranquille (Quiet Budge) (1998, ISBN 2-205-04591-1)
13. Cheptel maudit (Cursed Livestock) (2004, ISBN 2-205-04887-2)
14. ... Courent dans la montagne (... Run in the mountain) (2007, ISBN 978-2-205-05714-0)

== Sources ==
- Le Génie des alpages in Pilote BDoubliées (in French)
- Le Génie des alpages albums Bedetheque (in French)

Footnotes
