= Rubrique-à-Brac =

Comic strip series by Gotlib

Cover of the first tome, published by Dargaud and drawn by Gotlib

Rubrique-à-Brac is a humorous comic strip series created in 1968-1972 by Gotlib. The title is a portmanteau of the French words rubrique (section) and bric-à-brac. Initially published in Pilote magazine, the series was republished as five hardbound books between 1970 and 1974 by Dargaud, and again in 2002 as one volume, which also included previously unpublished content. It is widely regarded as one of the cornerstones of today's humorous bande dessinée.

== Style ==
Rubrique-à-Brac is an assortment of short (two to three pages) unrelated strips, drawn in black and white (although the 2002 re-publication was colorized). Its fairly realistic graphics contrast with the surreal, sometimes satirical humour of its textual content. The result is comparable to a graphical form of deadpan humour. The backgrounds are almost non-existent, and a large portion of the panels is occupied by elaborate dialogues.

Rubrique-à-Brac revisits an extremely wide range of subjects, such as historical figures, classic fairy tales, folklore, foreign countries and cultures, sport, the making of comics (in strips in which the author is often involved), movie and television clichés, music, youth and infancy (often in strips implicitly telling the author's life), science, or the various uses of everyday items and everyday life. One of the most recurrent subjects is broccoli: this vegetable recurs as a running gag in many conversations, always unjustifiably mentioned by characters.

== Recurring characters ==
- Isaac Newton often appears in otherwise unrelated strips to be hit on the head by an unlikely object (among other things a seagull, a piano, a sloth, a button... not to mention his famous apple). This, of course, causes him to discover the law of universal gravitation.
- The unnamed ladybug owes its existence to Gotlib's dislike of drawing backgrounds. He created this character as a way to fill up the blank space, and it is often seen in the bottom corner of panels, usually commenting on their content.
- Professeur Burp is a zoologist who occasionally presents absurd pseudoscientific expositions on various animals and animal life (giraffe, hippopotamus, stag, pig, chameleon, kangaroo, hyena among the most outstanding and eccentric interpretations).
- Charolles (a caricature of Gotlib himself) and Bougret (a caricature of Gébé) are two criminal bureau detectives. The suspects in their various investigations are always the same two men: Blondeau Georges Jacques Babylas, a caricature of Goscinny, and Aristidès Othon Frédéric Wilfrid, a caricature of French cartoonist Fred. Although all evidence points to Aristidès, Blondeau is invariably found to be the culprit by Bougret, while Charolles is dumbfounded.
- Gotlib himself appears in a number of his own strips, whether as the artist (thus breaking the fourth wall), or as an actual character. Various other French comic artists also make appearances at one point or another.
