= Christian Godard =

French cartoonist (1932–2024)

- Born: Christian Serge Gustave Godard; 24 March 1932; Paris, France
- Died: 6 November 2024 (aged 92); Paris, France
- Occupation: Comic artist
- Works: Martin Milan; Spirou; Tintin

Christian Godard (24 March 1932 – 6 November 2024) was a French cartoonist of the series Martin Milan for Tintin magazine.

Godard also worked on various other series, including The Vagabond of Limbo, Norbert and Kari, Toupet, The Cyberkiller, and Oki.

Godard was born on 24 March 1932, and died from cancer in Paris on 6 November 2024, at the age of 92.
