= L'Embobineuse =

Coordinates: 43.31122°N 5.38312°E

L'Embobineuse (French pronunciation: [lɑ̃bɔbinøz]) is a music venue in Marseille. L'Embobineuse is a center for artistic events located in an old factory building. The venue combines artist in residence programming and live performances.

== Background ==
L'Embobineuse is led by a group of people that transformed squatted buildings into temporary artist spaces. This music venue opened in 2004. It puts in place the means to the home of artists (visual artists, musicians, dancers, designers) and provides tools for public recognition of their work.

Officially, it is (and always was) a non-profit organisation.
