= Jacques Lob =

French comic book writer

- Born: 19 August 1932 Paris, France
- Died: 24 May 1990 (aged 57) Château-Thierry, France
- Area: Writer
- Pseudonym: Lob
- Notable works: Ténébrax; Submerman; Blanche Épiphanie; Superdupont; Le Transperceneige
- Awards: Grand Prix de la ville d'Angoulême (1986)

A page from Submerman, displayed in Centre Belge de la Bande Dessinée, Brussels

Jacques Lob (19 August 1932 – 24 May 1990) was a French comics creator, known for several comics creations, including Superdupont. His series Le Transperceneige, later continued by Benjamin Legrand, was adapted into the 2013 post-apocalyptic science fiction action film Snowpiercer.

== Biography ==
Jacques Lob began his career as an illustrator of humorous cartoons that were published in various magazines, until Jean-Michel Charlier advised him to focus on his writing. Working for magazines like Pilote, Spirou, and Record in the early 1960s, he wrote material for artists such as Jean-Claude Mézières, Pierre Guilmard, Jo-El Azara and eventually Jijé providing material for Jerry Spring.

Upon meeting Georges Pichard, the two began a partnership that would span several works and a few genres. Initially they produced Ténébrax in 1964, for the short-lived magazine Chouchou; its serialisation continued in the Italian magazine Linus. For Pilote, they produced the family-friendly superhero parody, Submerman.

The following series Blanche Épiphanie, serialised in V Magazine in 1968, was of a different character however, and its erotic qualities caused mixed public reaction. Blanche Épiphanie was later republished by Les Humanoïdes Associés; a translated version of Blanche Épiphanie #3 - La Croisière infernale was translated into English and republished by HM Communications, Inc. in 1977 as Candice at Sea. In this genre, Lob and Pichard also produced Ulysse for Charlie Mensuel in 1969.

In collaboration with Gotlib, in 1972 he created his most famous character, Superdupont. It was first serialised in Pilote, and later in L'Écho des savanes, then drawn by Alexis, and after his death, by Solé.

His 1982 work Le Transperceneige (Snowpiercer) drawn by Jean-Marc Rochette, was later used as the basis for the works The Explorers (1999) and The Crossing (2000) with Rochette continuing his work, and Benjamin Legrand, editor of the original, contributing the writing. In 2013 the film Snowpiercer was adapted from the work. These works were translated to English in Titan Comics in 2014 under the names Snowpiercer: The Escape and Snowpiercer: The Explorers.

In 1986, he wrote "Intérieur Noir" for Edmond Baudoin in À Suivre and "Arlette et Charley" for Dan in Okapi, and in 1988, he teamed up with Baudoin again to start the series about the female cab driver "Carla".

== Partial bibliography ==
Series	Artist	Years	Volumes	Publisher
Ténébrax	Georges Pichard	1973		Serg
Submerman	Georges Pichard	1976–1978		Glénat
Blanche Epiphanie	Georges Pichard	1972–1984	6	Serg/Les Humanoïdes Associés/Dargaud
Ulysse	Georges Pichard	1974–1975	2	Dargaud
Superdupont	Gotlib/Alexis/Jean Solé/Neal Adams	1977–1983	4	Fluide Glacial

== Sources ==
- Jacques Lob publications in Pilote and Fluide Glacial – BDoubliées (in French)
- Jacques Lob albums – Bedetheque (in French)
