= Hebdogiciel =

French computer magazine

- August 2, 1985 cover
- Publisher: Shift Éditions
- First issue: 1983
- Final issue: January 1987
- Country: France
- Language: French
- ISSN: 0760-6125
- OCLC: 474110099

Hebdogiciel was a French computer magazine which was published from 1983 until January 1987. It was printed in a newspaper style format and focused on 8- and 16-bit home computers of the time, such as the Commodore 64, ZX80, TI-99/4A, and others.

Each issue was a collection of both news articles on computer and software testing, treated satirically, and listings of source code which could be typed in by the reader.
