= The Vagabond of Limbo =

1975–2003 comic series by Christian Godard and Julio Ribera

The Vagabond of Limbo (French: Le Vagabond des Limbes) is a French science fiction comic book series written by Christian Godard and illustrated by Julio Ribera, and published by Dargaud. It ran between 1975 and 2003.

The series follows the adventures of Axel Moonshine, once known as "The Great Conciliator", and his companion Musky, child of the Prince of the Eternauts. Banished from his world for breaking the Thirteenth Commandment ("thou shalt not cross the threshold of sleep"), Axel roams the universe, searching for the woman he met in his dreams, Chimera, who seems to be trapped in a world resembling ours. Axel Moonshine sees Musky as a boy, but in fact, she is a girl in her puberty, and he does not seem to realize she is attracted to him. Musky does not grow up until she decides to age for the one who she fell in love with. It is suggested that Chimeer is Musky as an adult woman.

== Volumes ==
=== Original volumes in French ===
- Volume 1: Le vagabond des limbes (The Vagabond of Limbo) (1975)
- Volume 2: L'Empire des soleils noirs (The Empire of Dark Suns) (1976)
- Volume 3: Les Charognards du cosmos (The Scavengers of the Cosmos ) (1976)
- Volume 4: Les Démons du temps immobile (The Demons of Still Time) (1978)
- Volume 5: L'Alchimiste suprême (An Ultimate Alchemist) (1979)
- Volume 6: Quelle réalité papa? (What is Reality, Papa?) (1980)
- Volume 7: La Guerre des Bonkes (The Bonkes War) (1981)
- Volume 8: Pour trois graines d'éternité (For Three Seeds of Eternity) (1981)
- Volume 9: Le Labyrinthe virginal (The Virgin Labyrinth) (1982)
- Volume 10: Le Dernier Prédateur (The Last Predator) (1983)
- Volume 11: Le Masque de Kohm (The Mask of Kohm) (1984)
- Volume 12: Les Loups de Kohm (The Wolves of Kohm) (1985)
- Volume 13: L'Enfant-roi d'Onirodyne (The Child-King of Dreamforce) (1986)
- Volume 14: La Petite Maîtresse (The Little Mistress) (1987)
- Volume 15: Le Temps des oracles (The Time of the Oracles) (1988)
- Volume 16: Le Dépotoir des étoiles (The Junkyard of the Stars) (1988)
- Volume 17: La Martingale céleste (The Celestial Martingale) (1989)
- Volume 18: Les Contrebandiers du futur (The Smugglers of the Future) (1989)
- Volume 19: Un tramway nommé délire (A Streetcar Named Delirium) (1990)
- Volume 20: Un certain monsieur KO (A Certain Mister KO) (1990)
- Volume 21: La Décharge (The Dumping Ground) (1990)
- Volume 22: Le Solitaire (The Lonely One) (1992)
- Volume 23: La Rupture (The Break Up) (1993)
- Volume 24: Muskie, encore, et toujours... (Muskee, once more and always…) (1995)
- Volume 25: Le Petit Clone (The Little Clone) (1996)
- Volume 26: Le Point de non retour (The Point of No Return) (1997)
- Volume 27: Le Monde à l'envers (The World Backwards) (1998)
- Volume 28: Le Carnaval des animonstres (The Carnival of Animonsters) (1999)
- Volume 29: La Réconciliation (The Reconciliation) (2000)
- Volume 30: Le Retour vers Xantl (The Return to Xantl) (2001)
- Volume 31: La Planète des prodiges (The Planet of Wonders) (2003)
- Volume 32: L'Engrenage (unofficial approximate translation: "The Chain of Events" or "The Trap") (unpublished)

In addition, eleven compilation volumes have been released as of July 2007.

=== English translations ===
Two volumes have been published in English by Dargaud USA:

- What is Reality, Papa? (1981) ISBN 2-205-06950-0
- An Ultimate Alchemist (1983) ISBN 2-205-06953-5
