= Gotlib =

French comics author and publisher (1934–2016)

Marcel Gotlib
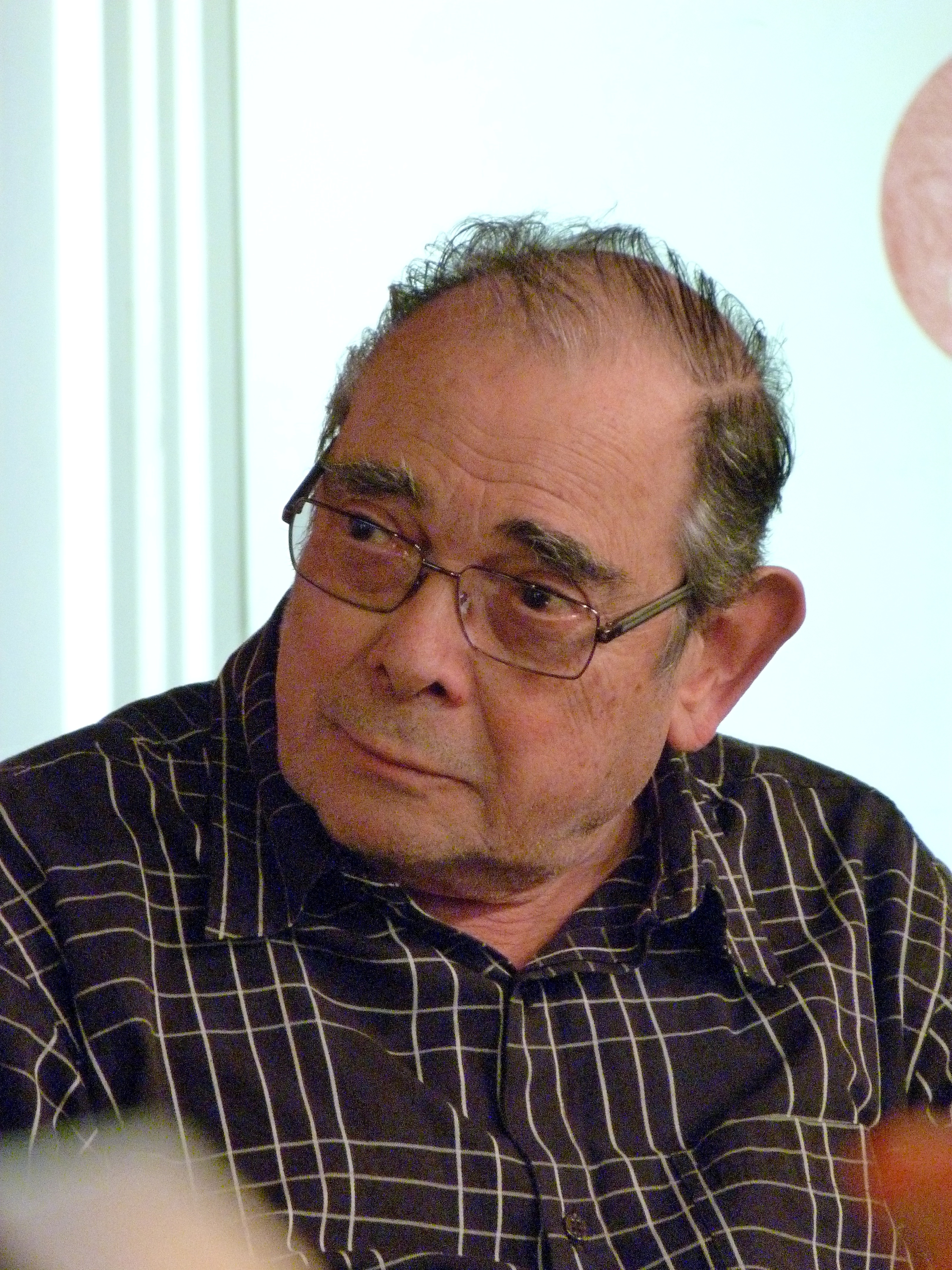
- Born: Marcel Mordekhaï Gottlieb; 14 July 1934 Paris, France
- Died: 4 December 2016 (aged 82) Le Vésinet, Yvelines, France
- Areas: Comics creator, publisher
- Notable works: Gai-Luron; Les Dingodossiers; Superdupont; Rubrique-à-Brac; Hamster Jovial.

Marcel Gottlieb (14 July 1934 – 4 December 2016), known professionally as Gotlib, was a French comics creator and publisher. Through his own work and the magazines he co-founded, L'Écho des savanes and Fluide Glacial, he was a key figure in the switch in French-language comics from their children's entertainment roots to an adult tone and readership. His series include Rubrique-à-Brac, Gai-Luron, and Superdupont. His comedy ranges from absurd, metafictional stories to satire with pop culture references and dark, scatological comedy.

== Early life ==
=== Youth ===
Marcel Gottlieb was born on 14 July 1934 in Paris to parents of Romanian and Hungarian Ashkenazi Jewish descent. His father, Ervin, was a house painter and his mother, Regine, a seamstress. In 1942 his father was deported and died at Buchenwald after their building's concierge obligingly helped policemen to find him, a scene which made a strong impression on young Marcel. His mother sent him to hide for the rest of the war on a farm, where he was poorly treated.

=== Vaillant and Pilote ===
At 17, he left school to work for a pharmaceutical agency while taking art classes in the evening. This led to a job as a letterer at Opera Mundi, a French publisher which translated and published US strips. After his 28-month military service, Gotlib settled as a freelance letterer and illustrator. His first comics were accepted by Vaillant, a magazine for children later renamed Pif-Gadget. His one long-running series at Vaillant started as Nanar, Jujube et Piette, which was renamed Nanar et Jujube then Gai-Luron for the supporting character who had by then taken centre stage. Gai-Luron is a dog heavily influenced by Tex Avery's Droopy, who almost never laughs or displays any emotions and is incorrigibly somnolent.

In 1965 Gotlib submitted strips to Pilote magazine and was greeted with open arms by its influential co-founder and editor, René Goscinny of Astérix fame. Together they created Les Dingodossiers, a series of mock lectures on random subjects which Goscinny wrote and Gotlib drew. In 1967, Goscinny, who worked on many strips simultaneously while editing the magazine, asked Gotlib to continue the series alone. Gotlib instead launched a new one, Rubrique-à-Brac, which was similar to the Dingodossiers in format but progressively acquired a more adult and less formal tone. Leftover pages from both series were later published in album form as Trucs-en-vrac.

Rubrique-à-Brac was a hit with Pilote's readers and made Gotlib famous. It introduced several signature Gotlib gimmicks, such as the extensive use of random running gags (Isaac Newton getting hit on the head by random objects being the omnipresent one) and the presence of a miniature character, a ladybug mimicking the action, to make up for the absence of settings, which Gotlib disliked drawing.

In 1971, Gotlib gave up the Gai-Luron series to his collaborator Henri Dufranne. He participated in a radio program with Goscinny, Fred and Gébé, and collaborated with film director Patrice Leconte, who made a documentary about him in 1974. Gotlib created another character, Hamster Jovial, for music monthly Rock & Folk. Hamster Jovial ("Genial Hamster") is an incurably naff boy-scout troop leader desperate to catch up with pop culture and impress his charges, two cubs and a girl guide.

=== L'Écho des savanes and Fluide Glacial ===
In 1972, Gotlib launched the comics magazine l'Écho des savanes with Claire Bretecher and Nikita Mandryka. The original aim was to get stories unsuitable for Pilote magazine—which was aimed at school-age readers—out of their system, but l'Écho des savanes was a huge commercial success.

However, the trio's complete lack of business training meant the magazine went deep in the red and they were forced to sell it to a publishing concern. Gotlib's contributions to the magazine were published in album form as Rhââ Lovely (named after a rapist's line in Alfred Hitchcock's Frenzy) and Rha-Gnagna. Those stories are mostly concerned with smashing taboos and feature much sexuality and other bodily functions, as well as cod-psychoanalysis and pot shots at authority figures of all kinds including divinities. Gotlib, Mandryka and Brétécher stopped working for l'Echo des Savanes after selling it.

Gotlib saw there was a strong market for adult comics and decided to start a new publication and have it run more professionally. To do this, he enrolled childhood friend, Jacques Diament, as administrator and another Pilote veteran, Alexis to help with the creative direction, and founded Fluide Glacial and parent publishing company 'Audie', a comically misspelled acronym of "Amusement, Umour, Derision, Ilarité Et toutes ces sortes de choses". Fluide Glacial launched the career of a number of unknown or little-known cartoonists, most of whom were influenced by Gotlib in the first place: Édika, Goossens and Dupuy & Berberian. Belgian veteran André Franquin contributed his Idées Noires strip. Alexis died of aneurysm rupture in 1977, leaving Gotlib and Diament in charge, though he is credited to this day as "Director of conscience" of Fluide Glacial.

Gotlib created two characters in Fluide Glacial: Superdupont with Jacques Lob and Pervers Pépère. Superdupont is a French, highly patriotic answer to US super-heroes who wears a vest and beret and fights a secret organisation called Anti-France. Gotlib mostly wrote or co-wrote Superdupont stories, though he drew a handful of them. The strip was successful enough to be made into a stage show by Jérôme Savary. Pervers Pépère is a stereotypical mac-sporting dirty old man who appeared in one-page stories. In the 1980s, he increasingly focused on running Fluide Glacial — in which he also wrote a column — and gradually withdrew from cartooning. However, he resuscitated Gai-Luron in 1986 when the back-catalogue was re-published by Audie and needed promoting; he drew enough new stories for a final album, La Bataille Navale.

=== Later years ===
In 1991, Gotlib received the Angoulême Festival Grand Prix and, as per tradition, chaired the jury of the next year's festival. In 1993, he wrote an autobiography, J'existe, je me suis rencontré, focusing on his youth, and in 2006 a more thorough one with journalist Gilles Verlant: Ma Vie-en-Vrac.

In 1995, having taken a back seat for a couple of years, Diament and Gotlib sold Fluide Glacial and Audie to publisher Flammarion and relinquished responsibilities, though Gotlib continued his column for some time. Fluide Glacial remains profitable and has outlived all its competitors such as Vaillant/Pif, Pilote and the Hara-Kiri stable.

== Graphic style ==
Gotlib's first series were made in a very humoristic tone. Each story consisted of two to four strips drawn in white and black. Rubrique-à-Brac and Les Dingodossiers consisted of didactic dossiers of short unrelated strips, drawn in black and white. They revisited an extremely wide range of subjects and dealt with stereotypes and clichés in a caricatural way. Gotlib used caricature and parodies to depict the everyday life, and greets it with extreme derision. In Cinemastok and Gai-Luron, the same technique was used, although these series were presented in a different manner.

Later, from his departure from Pilote in 1972, Gotlib's style changed a lot, the scenario as well as the illustrations. The last tome of Rubrique-à-Brac is already marked by this evolution, but it became more obvious with the series published in L'Echo des Savannes and Fluide Glacial. These two comics magazine were created by Gotlib for an adult audience exclusively, and made it possible for Gotlib to express himself entirely freely, while censorship was present in Pilote, magazine made for a young public. Rhââ Lovely , Rhâ-Gnagna and Pervers Pépère are series exclusively dedicated to sex satire, but sexual matters are also present in Hamster Jovial. Most of Gotlib's strips are background-free, with a large portion of the panels being occupied by elaborate dialogues. Also, the large majority of his series were black-and-white in their original publication.

In 1973 he designed the album cover for French guitarist Marcel Dadi's record 'La Guitare à Dadi' (1974).

== Awards ==
- 1976: Best French comical work at the Angoulême International Comics Festival for Gai-Luron
- 1991: Grand Prix de la ville d'Angoulême
- 2007: Grand Prix Saint-Michel, Brussels, Belgium

- Nominated for the Prix Saint-Michel Press Prize for Gotlib 1: Ma vie en vrac

- Asteroid 184878 Gotlib is named after Marcel Gotlib.

== Bibliography ==
- Les Dingodossiers with Goscinny (Dargaud, 3 volumes, 1967, 1972, 1975)
- Rubrique-à-Brac (Dargaud, 5 volumes, 1970 to 1974)
- Clopinettes with Mandryka (Audie - Fluide Glacial, 1974)
- Cinémastock with Alexis (Dargaud, 3 volumes, 1974 and 1976)
- Trucs En Vrac (Dargaud, 2 volumes, 1977 and 1985)
- Gai-Luron (Audie - Fluide Glacial, 10 volumes, 1975 to 1982)
- Rhââ Lovely (Audie - Fluide Glacial, 3 volumes, 1976 to 1978)
- Superdupont with Lob, Alexis and Solé (Audie - Fluide Glacial, 5 volumes, 1977, 1980, 1983, 1995)
- Hamster Jovial (Audie - Fluide Glacial, 1977)
- Rhâ-Gnagna (Audie - Fluide Glacial, 2 volumes, 1979 and 1980)
- Pervers Pépère (Audie - Fluide Glacial, 1981)
- Dans la joie jusqu'au cou with Alexis (Audie - Fluide Glacial, 1979)
