= Alexis (comics) =

- Born: Dominique Vallet; 18 September 1946 Boulogne-sur-Seine, Île-de-France, France
- Died: 7 September 1977 (aged 30) Paris, France
- Area: Artist
- Notable works: Timoléon; Cinémastok; Al Crane; Superdupont

Alexis (18 September 1946 – 7 September 1977) was the pseudonym of Dominique Vallet (French: [dɔminik vale]), a French comics artist, best known for his work on the series Al Crane and Superdupont.

== Biography ==
Alexis started working for Pilote magazine in 1968, providing illustrations and gags. In 1969, he began a collaboration with Fred on the series Timoléon, and started his working relationship with Gotlib on the film parody series Cinémastok in 1970.

The partnership with Gotlib continued for several years, leading to the creation of the magazine Fluide Glacial in 1975 where the advertising parody series La Publicité dans la Joie was published. In 1976, Alexis started the humorous western series Al Crane, in collaboration with Gérard Lauzier, and in 1977 he succeeded Gotlib as artist of the series Superdupont, written by Jacques Lob.

While working on the post-apocalyptic work Le Transperceneige, Alexis died as a result of a ruptured aneurysm on 7 September 1977, in Paris. His final work was later completed by Jean-Marc Rochette.

== Bibliography ==
Cover image of Al Crane

- Timoléon with Fred
  - 1. Time is Money (1974, Dargaud, ISBN 2-205-00760-2)
  - 2. 4 pas dans l'avenir (1975, Dargaud, ISBN 2-205-00872-2)
  - 3. Joseph le borgne (1975, Dargaud, ISBN 2-205-00907-9)
- Cinémastock with Gotlib
  - 1. Cinémastock (1974, Dargaud, ISBN 2-205-00759-9)
  - 2. Cinémastock 2 (1975, Dargaud, ISBN 2-205-00909-5)
- Avatars et coquecigrues (1975, Audie, ISBN 2-85815-157-1)
- Superdupont with Jacques Lob and Gotlib (1977, Audie, ISBN 2-85815-156-3)
- Al Crane with Gérard Lauzier
  - 1. Les aventures d'Al Crane (1977, Dargaud, ISBN 2-205-01178-2)
  - 2. Le retour d'Al Crane (1978, Dargaud, ISBN 2-205-01184-7)
- Et patati, et patata (1978, Dargaud, ISBN 2-205-01288-6)
- Fantaisies Solitaires (1978, Audie, ISBN 2-85815-158-X)
- Dans la joie jusqu'au cou with Gotlib (1979, Audie, ISBN 2-85815-046-X)
