= Gérard Lauzier =

French comics author and film director

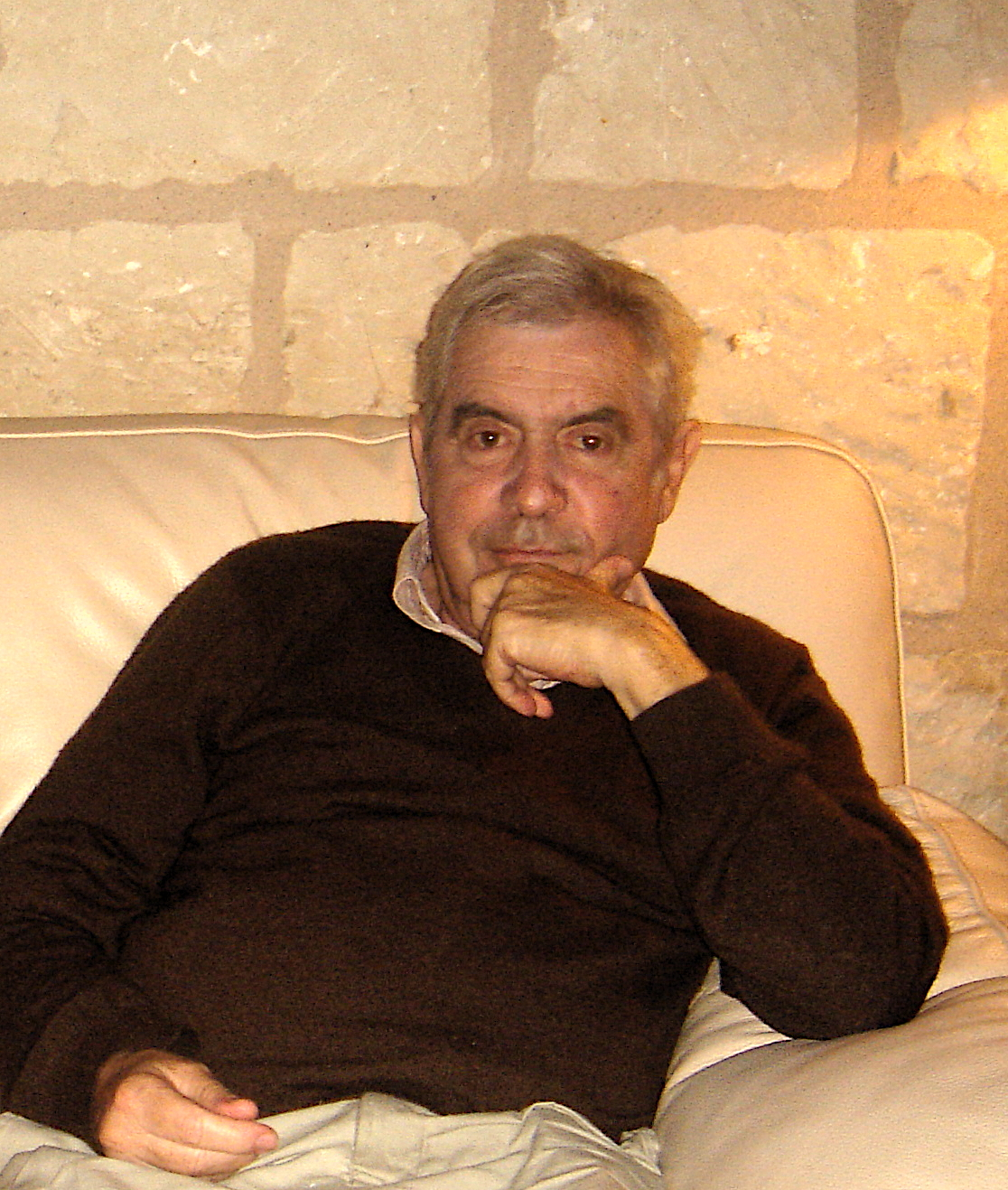
Gérard Lauzier (2008)

Gérard Lauzier (30 November 1932 – 6 December 2008) was a French comics author and movie director, best known as one of the leading authors in the more adult-oriented French comics scene of the 1970s and 1980s.

== Biography ==
Gérard Lauzier was born in Marseille on 30 November 1932. He studied philosophy and afterwards architecture at the École des Beaux-Arts in Paris. He worked in a press agency before travelling to Brazil, where he collaborated on the new capital Brasília. In 1959, he got conscription for the Algerian War.

In Brazil, he contributed editorial cartoons to Jornal do Bahia until he left the country in the wake of the 1964 military coup. Back in France, he worked for a number of magazines, most notably the soft erotic Lui where he made the series Les sextraordinaires aventures de Zizi et Peter Panpan. His major comics work appeared in the Franco-Belgian comics magazine, Pilote, where he worked between 1974 and 1985 (by this time, Pilote magazine had moved in a more adult direction). His main series of this period are Lili Fatale and Tranches de vie. His most iconic character is Michel Choupon, an oversexed and philosophical 18-year-old, who starred in the comic Souvenirs d'un Jeune Homme and in the movie P'tit Con.

Lauzier's 1986 play L'Amuse-gueule was adapted into the 1988 film Door on the Left as You Leave the Elevator.

In later years, he became a film director, sometimes with movies based on his comics or on new stories. His most famous film is the 1991 Mon père ce héros with Gérard Depardieu, remade in English as My Father the Hero. Other titles include Le fils du Français with Josiane Balasko and Fanny Ardant, and Je vais craquer with Christian Clavier. In 1996 he directed The Best Job in the World which was entered into the 20th Moscow International Film Festival. He also contributed dialogues to other movies, including the 1999 Asterix and Obelix vs Caesar.

He died on 6 December 2008 in Paris, aged 76.

== Works ==
- 1973 : Un certain malaise, Dargaud
- 1974 : Lili Fatale, Dargaud
- 1975 : Tranches de vie, 5 tomes publiés en 1975, 76, 77, 78 et 86, Dargaud
- 1977 : Les aventures d'Al Crane (dessiné par Alexis), Dargaud
- 1977 : Chroniques de l'île grande, Dargaud
- 1978 : Le retour d'Al Crane (dessiné par Alexis), Dargaud
- 1978 : La course du rat, Dargaud
- 1979 : Les Sextraordinaires Aventures de Zizi et Peter Panpan, Glénat
- 1980 : La tête dans le sac, Dargaud
- 1980 : Les sexties, Glénat
- 1981 : Les Cadres, Dargaud
- 1983 : Souvenirs d'un jeune homme, Dargaud
- 1992 : Portrait de l'artiste, Dargaud
- 1999 : Le fils du Français

In 1981, publisher Dargaud released a two volume collection Lauzier (Intégrale), containing Tranches de vie I, II, III, IV in the first volume, and La course du rat - La tête dans les sac - Lili fatale - L'île grande in the second one.

== Awards ==
- 1967: Prix Jean Bellus
- 1978: Angoulême International Comics Festival Award for Best French Author
- 1981: Adamson Award
- 1993: Grand Prix de la ville d'Angoulême
