= Pilote =

French comic book

- Cover of the first Pilote issue #0
- Categories: French comics magazine
- First issue: October 29, 1959; 66 years ago
- Final issue: October 1, 1989; 36 years ago
- Company: Dargaud (1960–1989)
- Country: France
- Language: French
- ISSN: 0999-9728

Pilote (French: [pilɔt]), for a while subtitled the magazine of Asterix and Obelix (French: Le Journal D’Astérix et D’Obélix ) was a French comics magazine published from 1959 to 1989. Showcasing most of the major French or Belgian comics talents of its day the magazine introduced major series such as Astérix, Barbe-Rouge, Blueberry, Achille Talon, and Valérian et Laureline. Major comics writers like René Goscinny, Jean-Michel Charlier, Greg, Pierre Christin and Jacques Lob were featured in the magazine, as were artists such as Jijé, Morris, Albert Uderzo, Jean (Mœbius) Giraud, Enki Bilal, Jean-Claude Mézières, Jacques Tardi, Philippe Druillet, Marcel Gotlib, Alexis, and Annie Goetzinger.

Pilote also published several international talents such as Hugo Pratt, Frank Bellamy and Robert Crumb.

== History ==
Following the release of a teaser, issue number 0, on June 1, Pilote officially launched on October 29, 1959.

The magazine was founded by experienced comic book writers Goscinny and Charlier, and artists Albert Uderzo and Jean Hébrard. Previously this team had worked together on several other projects, creating Le Supplément Illustré, a cartoon supplement for stuff like newspapers, and providing cartoons for Radio-Télé, a magazine published by Radio-Luxembourg. Pilote was promoted by Radio-Luxembourg and featured editorials written by well-known personalities of the era. The first issue of Pilote was met with overwhelming demand, selling out all 300,000 copies in a single day.

Unlike Belgian competitive magazines, such as Tintin and Spirou, the magazine was positioned to target an adolescent audience from the time of its launch.

Charlier and Goscinny handled most of the initial writing. Although Charlier came up with two popular series, Tanguy et Laverdure with Albert Uderzo and Barbe-Rouge (Redbeard) with Victor Hubinon, it was Goscinny and Uderzo’s Astérix le Gaulois which was the biggest hit and the magazine’s initial mainstay.

== Difficulties ==
Financial problems arose in 1960, but were resolved when the magazine was bought out by Dargaud publishers. Dargaud expanded the magazine with several new series, including Charlier and Giraud’s Blueberry and Greg's Achille Tallon in 1963. In 1967 the popular science-fiction series Valérian et Laureline debuted and in 1968 the popular Western comedy Lucky Luke (by Morris) was transferred to Pilote from Spirou magazine. Other notable appearances included series from the British comics magazine Eagle such as Fraser l'Africain (Fraser of Africa) and Winston Churchill by Frank Bellamy.

Attempts were made in the 1970s to update the magazine with material of more interest to adults, but many artists like Druillet and Giraud felt Pilote was no longer the appropriate vehicle for their aspirations and left to found new magazines such as Métal Hurlant (the French original that inspired Heavy Metal). Partly as a result, Dargaud reduced Pilote’s publication schedule from weekly to monthly in 1974, and René Goscinny was replaced as editor-in-chief. At this time, a new generation of artists also started publishing in Pilote, namely Caza, Lauzier, and F'Murr. Their comics reflected the new, more adult direction.

Sales initially improved but a steady erosion took place through the 1980s as interest in the medium declined. Pilote was merged with the comics magazine Charlie Mensuel in 1986 and continued as Pilote et Charlie until 1988, when the name was changed back to Pilote. However, declining sales prompted Dargaud to suspend publication after what became the final issue on 1 October 1989.

After 1989, there has been no regular publications of the magazine, although the name has been used for occasional oversized specials.

== Main authors and series ==
- Alexis: Timoléon et Stanislas (1969–1973), Al Crane (1976–1977)
- Philippe Bertrand: Linda aime l'art (1983–1989)
- Enki Bilal: Légendes d'Aujourd'hui (1976–1982), La foire aux immortels (1980)
- Michel Blanc-Dumont: Jonathan Cartland (1974–1988)
- Claire Bretécher: Cellulite (1969–1977)
- Cabu: Grand Duduche (1963–1982)
- Caza: Scènes de la vie de banlieue (1975–1979)
- Jean Chakir: Séraphin contre Angelure (1962–1970)
- Jean-Michel Charlier: Blueberry (1963–1973), Barbe-Rouge (1959–1969), Tanguy et Laverdure (1959–1970)
- Pierre Christin: Valérian and Laureline (1967–1985), Légendes d'Aujourd'hui (1976–1982)
- Delinx: Buck Gallo (1963–1969)
- Philippe Druillet: Lone Sloane (1970–1974)
- F'Murr: Le Génie des alpages (1973–1989)
- Fred: Philémon (1965–1986)
- Jean Giraud: Blueberry (1963–1973)
- Christian Godard: Norbert et Kari (1963–1970), Vagabond des limbes (1978–1987)
- René Goscinny: Asterix (1959–1973), Lucky Luke (1967–1973), Iznogoud (1968–1977), Petit Nicolas (1959–1965)
- Marcel Gotlib: Dingodossiers (1965–1967), Rubrique-à-Brac (1968–1973)
- Greg: Achille Talon (1963–1981)
- Laurence Harlé: Jonathan Cartland (1974–1988)
- Victor Hubinon: Barbe-Rouge (1959–1969)
- Jijé: Tanguy et Laverdure (1966–1970)
- Claude Lacroix: Homme au chapeau mou (1977–1983)
- Lauzier: Tranche de Vie (1970–1978), Al Crane (1976–1977)
- Jacques Lob: Submerman (1967–1970)
- Nikita Mandryka: Concombre masqué (1971–1981), Clopinettes (1970–1973)
- Martial: Tony Laflamme (1963–1971)
- Jean-Claude Mézières: Valérian and Laureline (1967–1985)
- Morris: Lucky Luke (1967–1973)
- Antonio Hernandez Palacios: Mac Coy (1974–1989)
- Julio Ribera: Vagabond des limbes (1978–1987), Dracurella (1973–1982)
- Sempé: Petit Nicolas (1959–1965)
- Jean Tabary: Iznogoud (1968–1977), Valentin le vagabond (1962–1974)
- François Thomas: Stan Caïman (1982–1989)
- Albert Uderzo: Asterix (1959–1973), Tanguy et Laverdure (1959–1967)

Some of the main authors in 1973

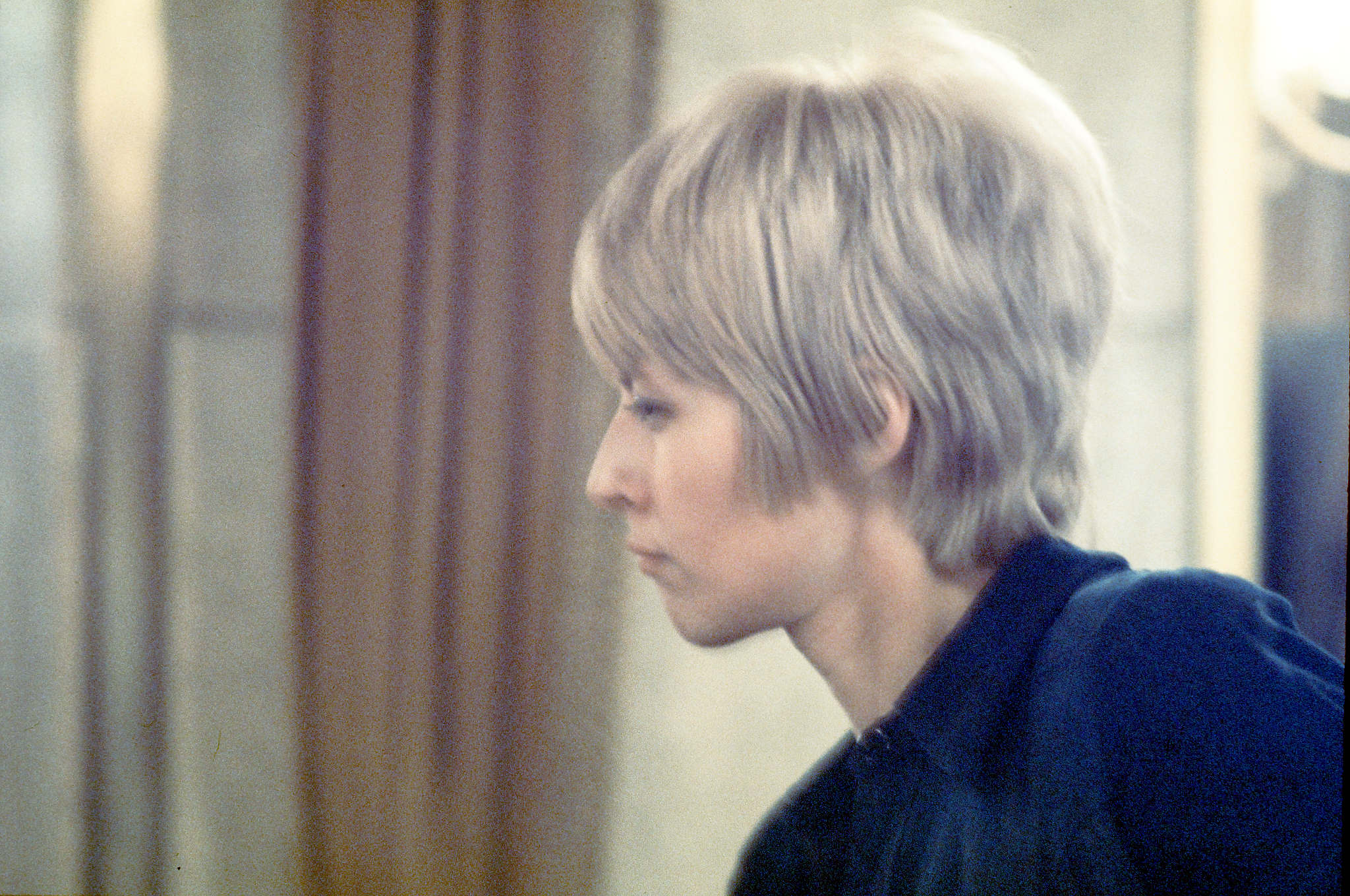
Claire Bretécher

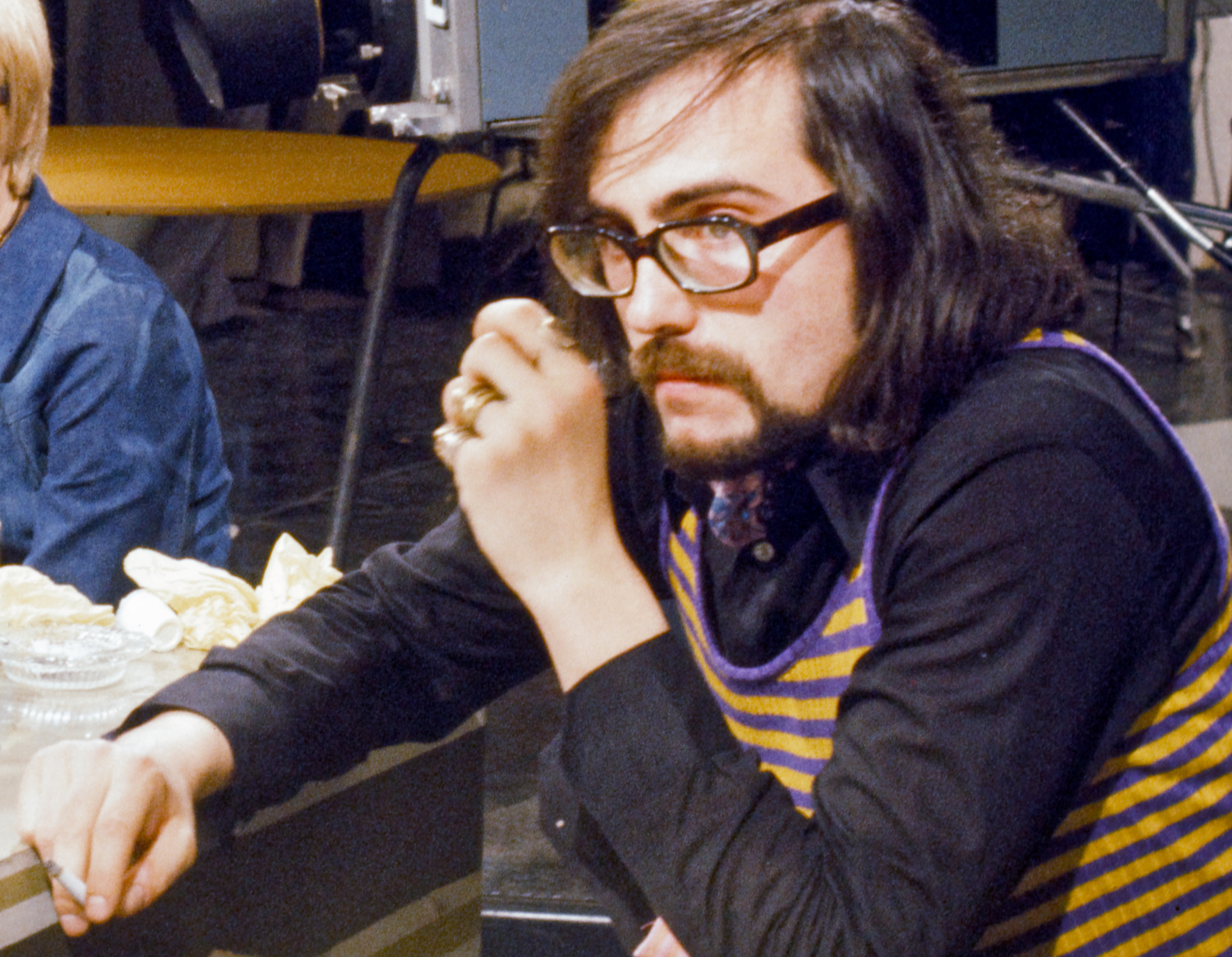
Philippe Druillet

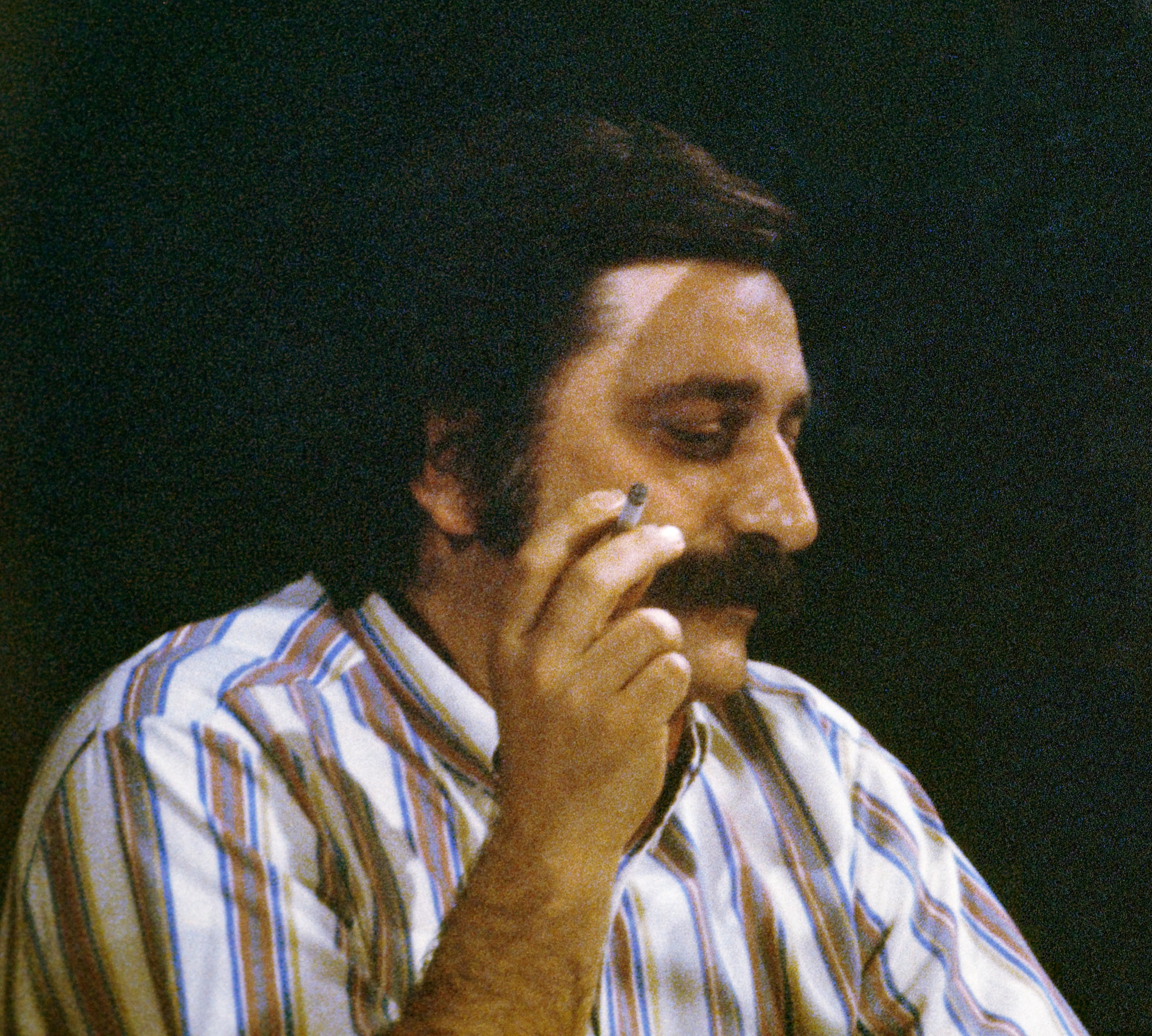
Fred

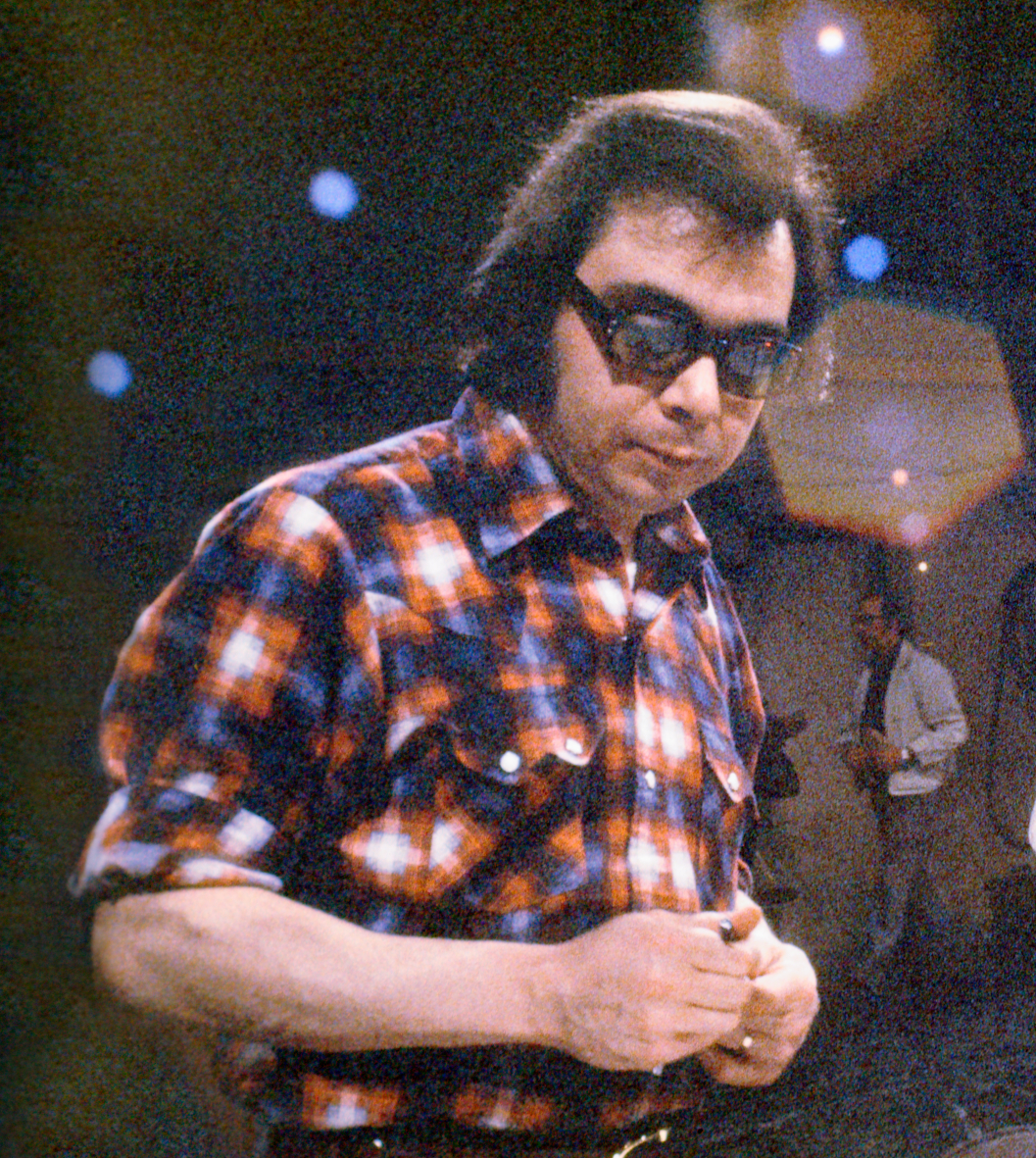
Marcel Gotlib

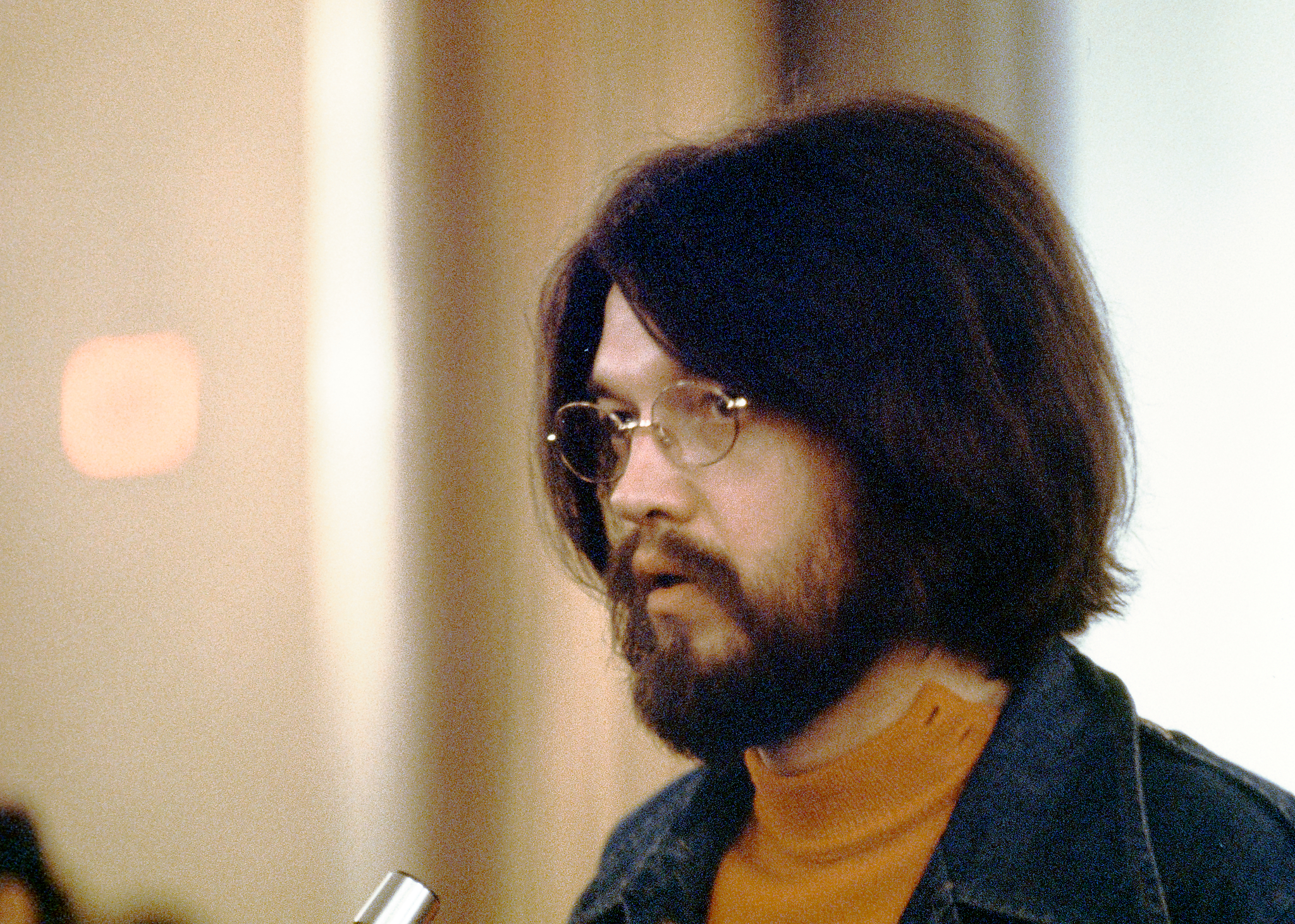
Nikita Mandryka

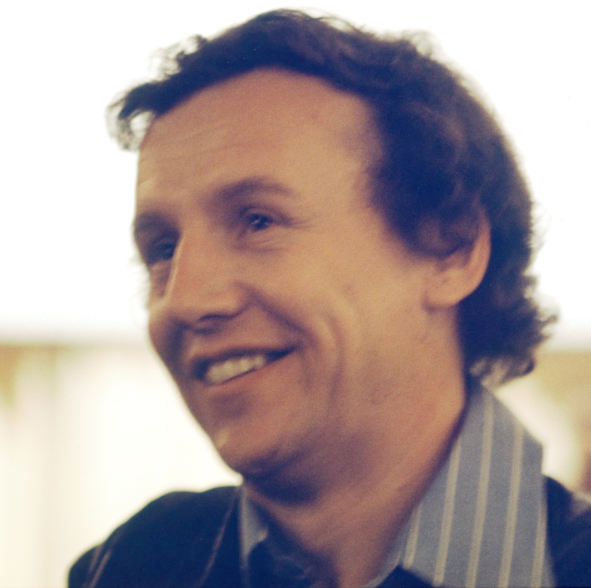
Jean-Claude Mézières

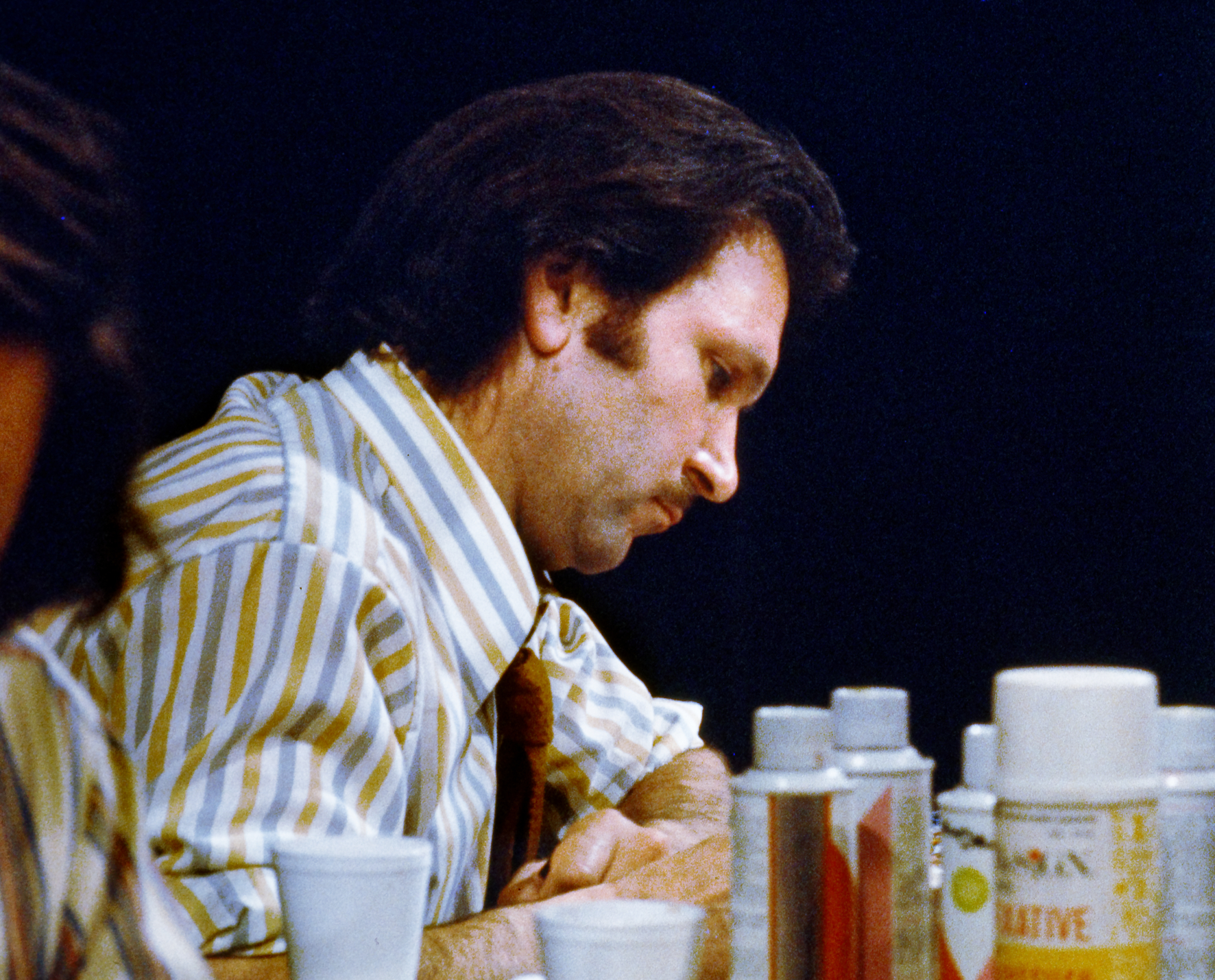
Jean Tabary

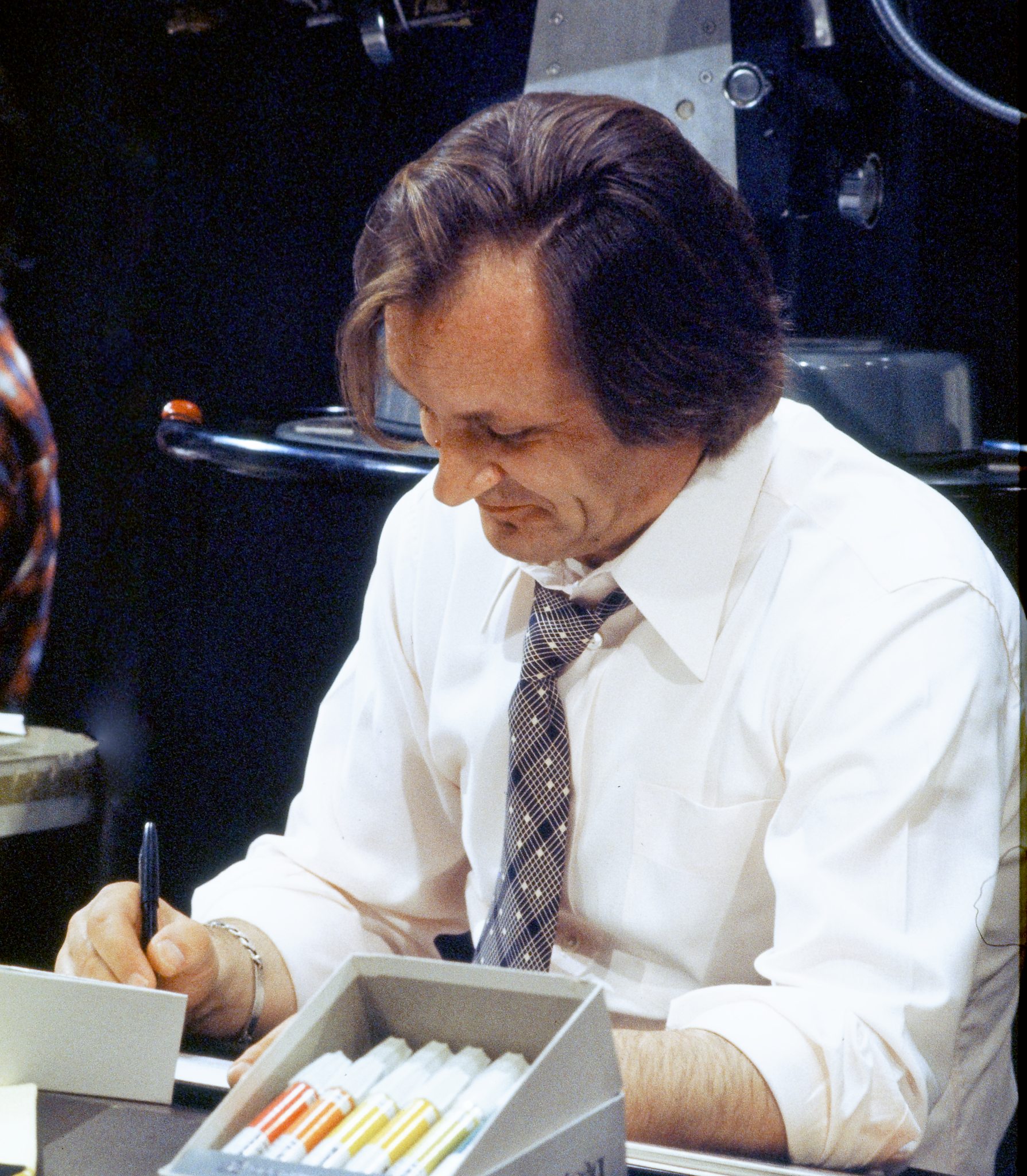
Albert Uderzo

== Circulation ==
Pilote circulation figures
Publication schedule	Issue date(s)	Issue circulation	Magazine sales
Weekly	29 October 1959	300,000	300,000
Weekly	5 November 1959 to 7 January 1960	235,000	2,350,000
Weekly	14 January 1960 to December 1960	125,000	6,375,000
Weekly	1961 to 1973	125,000	84,500,000
Monthly	1974 to 1988	125,000	22,500,000
Monthly	January 1989 to October 1989	125,000	1,250,000
	Total sales		117,275,000
