= Fluide Glacial =

- June 2013 issue
- Categories: Comics magazine
- Frequency: Monthly
- Founder: Gotlib, Alexis and Jacques Diament
- Founded: 1 April 1975
- Company: Bamboo Édition
- Country: France
- Based in: Paris
- Language: French
- Website: www.fluideglacial.com
- ISSN: 0339-7580

Fluide Glacial (French pronunciation: [flɥid ɡlasjal]) is a monthly French comics magazine and a publishing house founded on 1 April 1975 by Gotlib, Alexis and Jacques Diament.

Since its foundation, it has featured the work of French and international authors and graphic artists such as Christian Binet, Jacques Lob, Luc Nisset, Édika, Claire Bretécher, Jean Solé, François Boucq, Moebius, Masse, Jean-Claude Mézières, Loup, Daniel Goossens, Stéphane Charbonnier, Tignous and André Franquin. Nowadays it also features the work of a new generation of authors and comics artists such as Riad Sattouf, Arthur De Pins, Julien/CDM, Guillaume Bouzard, Mo/CDM and Romain Dutreix.

It was owned by Groupe Flammarion from 1995 until 2016, when it was bought by Bamboo Édition.

Yan Lindingre has been the magazine's editor in chief since 2012.

== Sources ==
- Fluide Glacial publications by the year BDoubliées (in French)
