= Comix 2000 =

International one-shot independent comic book

- Page count: 2000 pages
- Publisher: L'Association
- ISBN: 978-2844140227

Comix 2000 was an international one-shot independent comic book published in 1999 by L'Association (France) and distributed in the United States by Fantagraphics Books.

All the comics featured in Comix 2000 are wordless in order to accommodate readers of any nationality Notable contributors to Comix 2000 include Jessica Abel, Edmond Baudoin, Nick Bertozzi, Stéphane Blanquet, Émile Bravo, David B., Mike Diana, Julie Doucet, Renée French, Tom Hart, Dylan Horrocks, Megan Kelso, Patrice Killoffer, James Kochalka, Étienne Lécroart, Jean-Christophe Menu, Brian Ralph, Ron Regé, Jr., Joann Sfar, R. Sikoryak, Lewis Trondheim, Chris Ware, Skip Williamson, and Aleksandar Zograf.

The book's layout resembles that of a dictionary, with 2000 pages of comics depicting the work of 324 authors from 29 different countries, plus an introduction—in ten different languages—and a bibliography for each contributor.

== Contributors ==
A Jessica Abel, Filipe Abranches, Peggy Adam, Darío Adanti, Kalah Allen, Suzy Amakane, Ambre, Max Andersson, Andreas, Anne-Fred, Craig Au-Yeung Ying Chai, Diego Aranega, Popay Ayguavives, François Ayroles B Rafaele Bacchetta, Alex Baladi, Edmond Baudoin, Fred Belonie, Olle Berg, Nick Bertozzi, Frederique Bertrand, Brian Biggs, Clement Bikao, Christophe Blain, Matthieu Blanchin, Stéphane Blanquet, Blex Bolex, Frédéric Boilet, Paz Boïra, Pakito Bolino, David Bolvin, Conrad Botes, Simon Bossé, Denis Bourdaud, Jean Bourguignon, Émile Bravo, Matt Brinkman, Laetitia Brochier, Matt Broersma, Emmanuel Brughera C Max Cachimba, Julio Caetano, Calpurnio, Captain Cavern, Jean-François Caritte, Rémy Cattelain, Géraldine Cavalli, Florence Cestac, Chauzy, Mariana Chiesa Mateos, Lee Chihoi, Chric, Laurent Cilluffo, Cizo, Claire, David Collier, Colonel Moutarde, Greg Cook, Marco Corona, Philippe Coudray D David B., Étienne Davodeau, Frédéric de Broutelles, Jan-Willem de Vries, Ludovic Debeurme, Jean-Philippe Delhomme, Guy Delisle, Jean-Claude Denis, Denis Deprez, Mike Diana, Joe Dog, Gaëtan Dorémus, Julie Doucet, Olivier Douzou, Boyan Drenec, Eric Drooker, Jean-Pierre Duffour, Jean-Yves Duhoo, Charles Dutertre, Sophie Dutertre E Édith, Mauro Entrialgo F Yann Fastier, Faujour, Ester Ferrandiz, Feuchtenbergerowa, Alex Fito, Sylvie Fontaine, Vincent Fortemps, Émile Franc, Frankyravi, Fredox, Renée French, Ursula Fürst G G.G., Gérard Gaillard, Anne Gallet, Line Gamache, Sergio García, Alain Garrigue, Jochen Gerner, Dominique Goblet, Philippe Gerbaud, Golo, Grabowski, Julie Graux, Guillaume Guerse, Emmanuel Guibert, Aurélie Guillerey, Thierry Guitard	H Matti Hagelberg, Kazuichi Hanawa, Tom Hart, Maaike Hartjes, Hendrik Hegray, Mark Hendriks, William Henne, Manolo Hidalgo, Hideshi Hino, Dylan Horrocks, Milan Hulsing I Ibn Al Rabin, Imius, Ivang J Benoît Jacques, Caroline Jaegy, Adam Jamieson, Jason, Brad Johnson, Joisson Philippe, Joko, Louis Joos, Josépé, Olivier Josso, Denis Jourdin, Juanjo el Rápido K Kafka, Kakouwo, Hyuna Kang, Megan Kelso, Hironori Kikuchi, Patrice Killoffer, Kamel Khalif, Chris Knox, James Kochalka, Kohell, Yoshihiro Koizumi, Mattt Konture, Kati Kovács, Erik Kriek, Krystine Kryttre L La Sofrocogedec, Éric Lambé, Sergio Langer, Roger Langridge, Chris Lanier, Larcenet, Karel Lauwers, Lauzán, Yannick Lecoeur, Étienne Lécroart, Matthias Lehmann, Sandrine Lemoult, Léo, Håkan Lindgren, Linhart, Liniers, Lolmède, Jean-Christophe Long, Xavier Löwenthal, Lubie, Maximiliano Luchini, Gunnar Lundkvist M M. Culbuto, Nicolas Mahler, Markus, Pauline Martin, Gérard Marty, Marc-Antoine Mathieu, Mathis, Mats!?, Michaël Matthys, Massimo Mattioli, Pierre Maurel, Max, Max, Mazan, Jean-Christophe Menu, Mezzo, Sasha Mihajlovich, Mika, Mimi, Harry Morgan, Morvandiau, Ricardo Mosner, Hideyasu Moto, Lillian Mousli, Mutis, Muzo N Nash, Morgan Navarro, Neurone Pipéro, Carlos Nine, Nicoulaud, Hans Nissen, Noyau, Nuvish, Terhi Numminen O Okuda Robot, Olaf, Javier Olivares, Annmari Olsson, Thomas Ott, Pierre Ouin	P P.Gui, Pajak, José Parrondo, Pascal, Frederik Peeters, Pepe Farruqo, Jean-Michel Perrin, Renaud Perrin, Ethan Persoff, Lorenz Peter, Phil, Marc Pichelin, Elenio Pico, Michel Pirus, Placid, Frédéric Poincelet, Carlos Portela, Pyon R Pascal Rabaté, Brian Ralph, Nadia Raviscioni, Jake Raynal, Ron Regé Jr., Tania Regis, Rémi, Axel Renaux, Helge Reumann, Sandrine Revel, Stefano Ricci, Fabrice Rivière, Rocco, Jenni Rope, Stéphane Rosse, Marcel Ruijters S David Sandlin, Sanghon, Pablo Sapia, Mathieu Sapin, Lorenzo Sartori, Tobias Schalken, Charlie Schlingo, Bart Schoofs, Géraldine Servais, Joann Sfar, Tamir Shefer, Natacha Sicaud, Allan Sieber, R. Sikoryak, Siris, Lars Sjunnesson, Anna Sommer, Stanislas, Ted Stearn, Michaël Sterckeman, Florence Sterpin, Richard Suicide, Caroline Sury T Mathew Tait, Alfonso Tamayo, Tanitoc, Hervé Tanquerelle, TG, Tom Tirabosco, Tofépi, Antonella Toffolo, Esteban Tolj, Tomasz Tomaszewski, Martin tom Dieck, Touïs, Rick Trembles, Lewis Trondheim, Troubs, Katja Tukiainen, Typex U Ulf K. V Rodéric Valambois, Valkeapää, Anne van der Linden, Stefan van Dinther, Peter Guido van Driel, Thierry van Hasselt, David Vandermeulen, Vincent Vanoli, Jean-Emmanuel Vermot-Desroches, Laurent Verron, Martin Veyron, Vladimir, Berend J. Vonk, Ben Vranken W Chris Ware, Muddy Wehalla, Lorcan White, Willem, Skip Williamson, Winshluss, Nikola Witko, Wostok Y Hok Tak Yeung, Yoan, Yülle Z Zanzim Glouton, Danijel Zezelj, Fabio Zimbres, Aleksandar Zograf, Zou
