= Jean-Christophe Menu =

French underground cartoonist, graphic designer, comics scholar and publisher

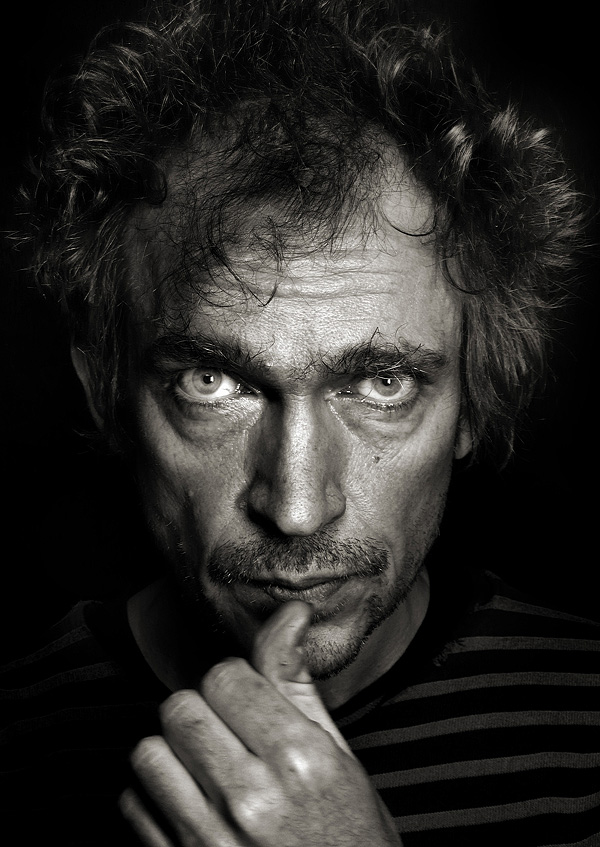
- Menu in 2008
- Born: 23 August 1964 (age 62) Amiens, France
- Areas: Cartoonist, Writer, Publisher

Jean-Christophe Menu (French: [məny]; born 23 August 1964) is a French underground cartoonist, graphic designer, comics scholar and publisher, son of the Egyptologist Bernadette Menu. He is best known for being one of the founders of L'Association, an influential comic book and art book publishing company from France often regarded as one of the key figures in the independent comic movement around the world.

== Biography ==
=== Beginnings ===
Menu started his careers as a comic artist and as a publisher simultaneously when he launched the fanzines Le Lynx à Tifs and Le Journal de Lapot in 1981. In 1984 he started working for Psikopat, where he introduced the character Meder. Soon, his work was found in various comic magazines like Tintin, Spirou, Fripounet and Jade in the Franco-Belgian comics world as well as Rip Off Comix and Weirdo in the United States. Futuropolis published his book Le Portrait de Lurie Ginol and a new magazine called Labo which only lasts one issue but brings the desire to later on create the magazine Lapin, which is still being published to this day.

=== L'Association ===
In May 1990, Menu and five other young cartoonists struggling to find an outlet for their work (Lewis Trondheim, David B., Patrice Killoffer, Mattt Konture, Stanislas and Mokeït) decided to launch L'Association.

In 1992 Menu, along with Lewis Trondheim François Ayroles, Anne Baraou, Gilles Ciment, Jochen Gerner, Thierry Groensteen, Patrice Killoffer and Étienne Lécroart, founded the Oubapo (Ouvroir de Bandes Dessinées Potentielles), which was inspired by Raymond Queneau and Georges Perec's Oulipo (Ouvroir de Littérature Potentielle).

One of L'Association's most recognizable and experimental books to date was the black-and-white anthology Comix 2000 which features work from over 300 creators from 29 countries in one 2,000-page hardcover volume. L'Association is also known for discovering and publishing Marjane Satrapi's book, Persepolis, which later inspired a film of the same name.

==== Controversy ====
In 2005, Menu published "Plates-bandes", a diatribe against the co-optation and wholesale copycatting of the indie, avant-garde, experimental, or alternative comics aesthetic by France's mainstream comic book publishers looking to corner what had suddenly become a lucrative market. Literally meaning "flowerbeds", the title is a pun involving part of the word for comics ("bande dessinée," or "drawn strip"), a concern that independent comics are headed for blandness and platitude ("plat," literally flat or insipid), and a gauntlet thrown down to mainstream publishers for encroaching on indie territory (the colloquial expression "trampling someone's flowerbeds" means to step on someone's toes). The book coincides with three of the original founders and a few authors leaving L'Association and finding work with many of mainstream publishers mentioned in its content.

In May 2011, after nearly six months of struggles within the structure, Menu announced his official departure from L'Association and spoke in a public letter of a desire to start a new project elsewhere.

=== Recent career ===
Menu continues to work on his comics. On 8 January 2011 he was awarded a doctorat en art et sciences de l'art (Doctorate in Art and Art Sciences) after defending his thesis La Bande dessinée et son double : langage et marges de la bande dessinée : perspectives pratiques, théoriques et éditoriales (The Comics and its Double: Language and Frontiers of Comics: Practical, Theoretical and Editorial Prospects). The thesis was under the supervision of Jacques Cohen (Université Paris 1 Panthéon-Sorbonne).

== Bibliography ==
=== Comic books by Jean-Christophe Menu ===
- L'Accident de Meder, AANAL, 1986.
- Le Portrait de Lurie Ginol, Futuropolis, 1987.
- Les aventures de 1987, L'Association ", 1987.
- Meder, Futuropolis, 1988. Republished by L'Association, 2005.
- Comix 2 Jours, Comix 2 Nuits, self-published, 1989.
- Moins d'un quart de seconde pour vivre, with Lewis Trondheim, L'Association,1991.
- Dinozor Apokalips, L'Association, 1991.
- Mune Comix 1, Cornélius, 1993.
- Mune Comix 2, Cornélius, 1993.
- Mune Comix 3, Cornélius, 1994.
- Mune Comix 4, Cornélius, 1994.
- Mune Comix 5, Cornélius, 1994.
- Omelette, L'Association, 1995.
- Livret de Phamille, L'Association,1995.
- La Présidente with Blutch, Autrement, 1995 republished by L'Association in 2010.
- Gnognottes, L'Association, 1999.
- La grande aventur de Vert Thépamur, Automne 67, 2001.
- Le Livre du Mont-Vérité, L'Association, 2002.
- Mini Mune Comix, L'Association, 2003.
- La Topographie interne du M., Les Requins Marteaux, 2007
- Lock Groove Comix N°1, L'Association, 2008
- La Marraine des Moines, L'Association, 2008.
- Lock Groove Comix N°2, L'Association, 2009.
- Lourdes coquilles, L'Association, 2009.

=== In English ===
- Dungeon: Monstres, Vol.1, The Crying Giant (with Mazan, Lewis Trondheim and Joann Sfar, NBM, 2008.

=== Writings by Jean-Christophe Menu ===
- Plates-Bandes, L'Association, 2005.
- Corr&spondance with Christian Rosset, L'Association, 2009.
- La bande dessinée et son double, L'Association, 2011.
