= Angoulême International Comics Festival Prize for Artwork =

This Prize for Artwork is awarded to comics authors at the Angoulême International Comics Festival. As is the customary practice in Wikipedia for listing awards such as Oscar results, the winner of the award for that year is listed first, the others listed below are the nominees.

== 2000s ==
- 2002: Le cri du peuple: Les canons du 18 mars by Jacques Tardi and Jean Vautrin, Casterman
  - Le Ché by Alberto Brecchia, Enrique Brecchia and Héctor Germán Oesterheld, Fréon
  - Les entremondes: Les eaux lourdes by Emmanuel Larcenet and Pascal Larcenet, Dargaud
  - Monsieur Mardi Gras Descendres: Le pays des larmes by Éric Liberge, Pointe Noire
  - Les olives noires: Pourquoi cette nuit est-elle... by Emmanuel Guibert and Joann Sfar, Dupuis
  - Sin City: L'enfer en retour by Frank Miller, Vertige graphic
  - Ubu Roi by Alfred Jarry and Daniel Casanave, 400 Coups
- 2003: Le dérisoire by Olivier Supiot and Eric Omond, Glénat
  - Hellboy: Le ver conquérant by Mike Mignola and John Byrne
  - Dr Jekyll et Mr Hyde by Jerry Kramsky and Lorenzo Mattotti
  - Manhattan Beach 1957 by Hermann and Yves H.
  - Oscar et Monsieur O by Emmanuel Moynot
  - Vitesse moderne by Blutch
- 2004: Blacksad: Arctic Nation by Juanjo Guarnido and Juan Diaz Canales, Dargaud
  - Le commis voyageur by Seth, Casterman
  - Les contes du 7ème souffle: Shiro Yuki by Hughes Micol and Eric Adam, Vents d'Ouest
  - Le curé: Le jugement by Christian De Metter and Laurent Lacoste, Soleil
  - Hulk: Banner by Brian Azzarello and Richard Corben, Panini Comics/Marvel
  - Léviathan by Jens Harder, L'An 2
  - Ping Pong part 1 by Taiyo Matsumoto, Delcourt
- 2005: The Summit of the Gods by Taniguchi, Kana
  - Donjon Monstres: Les habitants des profondeurs by Patrice Killoffer, Joann Sfar and Lewis Trondheim, Delcourt
  - L’enragé by Baru, Dupuis
  - La Malle Sanderson by Götting, Delcourt
  - Les mangeurs de vie by Hampton, Les Humanoïdes Associés
  - Smart monkey by Winshluss, Cornelius
  - Wolverine: Snikt! by Nihei, Panini Comics
- 2006: Le vol du corbeau part 2 by Jean-Pierre Gibrat, Dupuis
  - Chocottes au sous-sol by Stéphane Blanquet, La joie de lire
  - Cinéma Panopticum by Thomas Ott, L’Association
  - Gogo Monster by Taiyou Matsumoto, Delcourt
  - Mitchum by Blutch, Cornélius
  - Prestige de l’uniforme by Hugues Micol and Loo Hui Phang, Dupuis
  - Quimby the Mouse by Chris Ware, L’Association
