= Mattt Konture =

French underground comics author and musician

- Born: September 27, 1965 (age 61) Essonne, France
- Areas: Cartoonist, Writer, Artist
- Notable works: Krokodile Comix

Mattt Konture (born September 27, 1965) is a French underground comics author and musician. He is one of the founders of the French publishing house L'Association and is a forerunner of the French autobiographical comics movement.

== Biography ==
Konture grew up in Lozère, where his influences included Métal Hurlant artists like Marc Caro, Doury, Rita Mercedes, and Moebius.

Konture published his first comics in 1982 (at the age of 17) in magazines such as Viper ("L’ajeun") and Le Lynx ("Les Exploits de Ted" with Jean-Christophe Menu). When Konture went to Paris he published his first comics, Nerf, on an old Xerox machine. L’Association later reprinted this first book. His first comic book was Ruga Zébo Violent, first volume of the "Pattes de Mouche" collection published by L'ANAAL, to become L'Association.

At this time, Konture's drawings were very dark and full of strokes and looked like the growing American underground style. Konture later discovered 1960s American underground cartoonists such as R. Crumb and Gilbert Shelton, who inspired him to create psychedelic and autobiographical comics. In 1988, Konture started autobiographical comics such as Krokrodile Comix 1, or Galopu, that was a forerunner of the French underground movement.

In 1989 Konture returned to Lozère.

== Musical career ==
Konture has played in many musical groups (Les Tordus, Pumpkin Guts, Cosmogol, Rhinoplastic Démodex...), including his original one-man group Courge, which later changed its name to Lucky and the Courges, and which produces CDs and plays concerts in the Montpellier area where Konture lives.

== Bibliography ==
=== Books and collections ===
- Ruga Zébo Violent, AANAL, n°1 in the coll. « Patte de Mouche », 1986.
- Souterrain, Futuropolis, coll. « X », 1988.
- Supra plus, L'Association, coll. « Patte de Mouche », adherent gift, 1992.
- Printemps, Automnes, L'Association, coll. « Mimolette », 1993.
- Jambon Blindé, Chacal Puant, 4 tomes, 1995–1997.
- Glofluné Triblonto, L'Association, coll. « Patte de Mouche », 1996.
- Ivan Morve, L'Association, coll. « Éperluette », 1996.
- Galopinot (story and drawings), with Lewis Trondheim, L'Association, coll. « Patte de Mouche », 1998.
- Krokrodile comix II, L'Association, coll. « Mimolette », 1999.
- Tombe (la veste ?), L'Association, coll. « Mimolette », 1999.
- Head banger forever !?, L'Association, coll. « Mimolette », 2000.
- Barjouflasque, L'Association, coll. « Mimolette », 2000.
- Cinq heure du Mattt, L'Association, coll. « Mimolette », 2001.
- Les Contures, L'Association, coll. « Ciboulette », 2004.
- Galopu sauve la terre, L'Association, Hors-Collection, 2005.
- Sclérose en plaques, L'Association, coll. « Mimolette », 2006.
- Archives - Mattt Konture, L'Association, coll. « Archives », 2006.
- L'Abbé Noir, with Lilas and Willy Ténia, Arbitraire, 2011.
- Mattt Konture, L'Éthique du souterrain, D.V.D. and Comix : documentary by Francis Vadillo (with English subtitles), and Comixture Jointe by Mattt Konture, L'Association and Pages et Images, 2012.
- La Comète à 4 pattes, with Lilas, Willy Ténia and Freaky Nasa, L'Association, coll. « Patte de Mouche », 2012.
- Borrut Popotte, with Lilas, Le Dernier Cri, 2013.

=== Collections ===
- One page in Raaan, L'Association, adherent gift, 1994.
- One strip in Hommage à Monsieur Pinpon, L'Association, adherent gift, 1997.
- Two pages in Le Rab de Comix 2000, L'Association, adherent gift, 1999.
- Three pages in Comix 2000, L'Association, 1999.
- « Ivan Morve » in Sponge Comix, 6 pieds sous terre, 2000.
- a comics strip in Lapins, L'Association, adherent gift, 2000.
- « Les influences », in Bourrelet Comics, Les loups sont fâchés, 2002.
- Participates in l'Oupus t. 2, L'Association, coll. « OuBaPo », 2003.
- Participates in l'Oupus t. 4, L'Association, coll. « OuBaPo », 2005.
- A drawing in Myxomatose, Myxoxymore, 2006.
- Cover of Speed Ball, a comics fanzine.
- A few pages in My way, a comics fanzine.

=== Magazines and fanzines ===
- Viper, 1984.
- Le Lynx, L'ANAAL, 1984.
- Le Banni, 1988.
- Labo, Futuropolis, 1989.
- Lapin, L'Association, 1992–2006.
- Jade, 6 pieds sous terre, 1995–1996.
- La Table, auto-édition, 1995–1998.
- La Monstrueuse, Chacal Puant, 1996.
- BURP, his own fanzine, n°1-10.
- Apéro-comix, silkscreen comics-based collective fanzines.
- Passerelle Eco, n°3-30, 1999–2005, drawings for écological articles, comix pages and logos
- En Traits Libres, collective fanzine started in 2009 (n°1-6).
- 9 pages in Le Fanzine Carré, Hécatombe Editions, 2013.
