= Unlock! =

Escape room-themed board game

- Other names: Project 59:59 (working title)
- Designers: Cyril Demaegd
- Publishers: Space Cowboys
- Publication: February 2017
- Genres: Escape room, Puzzle, Card game
- Languages: French, English, various
- Players: 1–6
- Playing time: 60 - 90 minutes
- Chance: None
- Age range: 10+
- Skills: Lateral thinking, Observation, Deduction, Cooperation
- Materials required: Cards, Token sheets (depending on scenario)
- App Required: iOS / Android
- Website: https://www.spacecowboys.fr/unlock-english

Unlock! is a series of cooperative board games inspired by escape rooms created by Cyril Demaegd. published by Space Cowboys and distributed by Asmodee.

The first title was released in France in February 2017, and won the As d'Or – Game of the Year at the International Games Festival in Cannes on 23 February 2017. The formula has since been adapted into numerous box sets, each offering three different scenarios of increasing difficulty, designed to last from 60 to 90 minutes each.

== Gameplay ==
The players' objective is to solve a scenario proposed by the game within a time limit (usually 60 minutes), typically requiring the resolution of riddles and the exploration of an imaginary world. The scenario is represented by numbered cards depicting locations, objects, or characters, which players must retrieve in a specific order; riddles or combinations of multiple cards allow players to obtain the number of the next card. Box sets may also contain specific accessories for each scenario.

The game utilizes a mandatory smartphone application, with which players must regularly interact to enter codes, operate mechanisms, listen to audio clues, etc. It also serves as a timer and can be used to obtain hints if players are stuck. Finally, the application calculates the final score at the end of the game based on the time taken and the number of hints used.

The game is designed to be played solo or cooperatively with multiple players. Unlike some competitors in the genre, the scenarios are reusable by other players afterward, as the game components are not destroyed or altered during play.

== Development ==
The game was designed by Cyril Demaegd, a co-founder of Ystari and Space Cowboys. During development, the game was known under the working title "Project 59:59". Demaegd was inspired to create the game after participating in real-life escape rooms, specifically citing "Fox in a Box" in Paris as an influence. His goal was to recreate the adrenaline rush and tension experienced during the final minutes of a live escape room within a card game format.

== Board Game Series ==
=== Original Series (10+) - 3-Adventure Box Sets ===
- 2017 - Escape Adventures - Cyril Demaegd, Alice Carroll, Thomas Cauet
- 2017 - Mystery Adventures - Cyril Demaegd, Fabrice Mazza, Arnaud Ladagnous, Sébastien Pauchon, Billy Stevenson
- 2017 - Secret Adventures - Thomas Cauet, Arch Stanton, Lewis Cheshire
- 2018 - Exotic Adventures - Cyril Demaegd, Germain Winzenschtark
- 2019 - Heroic Adventures - Vincent Goyat, Dave Neale, Thomas Cauet, Cyril Demaegd, Mathieu Casnin
- 2019 - Timeless Adventures - Guillaume Montiage, Aristide Bruyant, Yohan Servais
- 2019 - Epic Adventures - Mathieu Casnin, Luna Marie, Guilaine Didiern, Gabriel Dumerin, Théo Rivière
- 2020 - Mythic Adventures - Jérémy Fraile, Yohan Servais, Cyril Demaegd, Vincent Goyat
- 2020 - Star Wars - Cyril Demaegd, Jay Little, Mercedes Opheim, Ariel Brooks
- 2021 - Game Adventures - Thomas Cauet, Mathieu Casnin, Jeremy Koch
- 2021 - Legendary Adventures - Dave Neale, Marion du Faouët, Cyril Demaegd, Mathieu Casnin
- 2022 - Extraordinary Adventures - Thomas Cauet, Mathieu Casnin, Jeremy Koch
- 2023 - Supernatural Adventures - Renaud Chaillat, Mathieu Casnin, Jack Gitz
- 2024 - Risky Adventures - Lewis Trondheim, Pierre Chabosy, Cyril Demaegd, Julien Jovis, Romain Pujol, Mathieu Casnin
- 2025 - Enchanted Adventures
- 2026 - New Game Adventures

=== Unlock! Short Adventures (10+) - 1 Deck = 1 Adventure ===
- 2022 - Secret Recipes of Yore
- 2022 - The Secrets of the Octopus
- 2022 - The Flight of the Angel
- 2022 - The Awakening of the Mummy
- 2022 - Doo-Arann's Dungeon
- 2022 - In Pursuit of Cabrakan
- 2023 - Red Mask
- 2023 - The Birmingham Murder
- 2023 - Schrödinger's Cat
- 2024 - Inside the Mind of Sherlock Holmes
- 2025 - The Song of the Sea Spray
- 2025 - The Heart of the Ocean
- 2026 - The Ascent
- 2026 - The Path of the Katana

=== Kids Version (6+) - Unlock! Kids (3-Adventure Box Sets) ===
- 2021 - Detective Stories
- 2022 - Stories from the Past
- 2023 - Legendary Stories
- 2024 - Irish Folklore Trilogy

=== Young Kids Version (4+) - My First Unlock! (3-Adventure Box Sets) ===
- 2025 - Duck Stories

== Derivative Products ==
=== Game Books ===
- 2022 - Escape from the Eiffel Tower
- 2024 - Escape from Prison!
- 2024 - Mission Pyramid
- 2023 - Noside's Vacation
