= Bernadette Menu =

French historian and egyptologist (1938–2023)

- Born: 8 May 1938; Amiens, France
- Died: 29 May 2023 (aged 85); Aubenas, France
- Occupations: Archaeologist, Egyptologist
- Children: Jean-Christophe Menu
- Awards: Prix de l’Académie française

Bernadette Marie Thérèse Menu (née Mangin, 8 May 1938 – 29 May 2023) was a French archaeologist and Egyptologist, whose research work on ancient Egypt is widely known. She was mother of the writer Jean-Christophe Menu.

== Life and career ==
Bernadette Menu was Honorary Director of Research at the French National Centre for Scientific Research (Paul Valéry University, Montpellier III), president of the Association internationale pour l’étude du droit de l’Égypte ancienne (“International Association for the Study of the Law of Ancient Egypt”) and a professor of Ancient Egyptian at Charles de Gaulle University – Lille III and Institut Catholique de Paris. Her illustrated pocket book about Ramesses II, Ramsès II : Souverain des souverains, from the collection “Découvertes Gallimard”, has been translated into eight languages, including English.

Menu died in Aubenas on 29 May 2023, at the age of 85.

== Publications ==
- Le régime juridique des terres et du personnel attaché à la terre dans le Papyrus Wilbour, Publications de la faculté des lettres et sciences humaines, N° XVII, Institut de papyrologie et d’égyptologie, 1970
- L’Obélisque de la Concorde, Éditions du Lunx, 1987
- Ramsès II : Souverain des souverains, collection « Découvertes Gallimard » (nº 344), série Histoire. Éditions Gallimard, 1998
  - US edition – Ramesses II: Greatest of the Pharaohs, “Abrams Discoveries” series. Harry N. Abrams, 1999
  - UK edition – Ramesses the Great: Warrior and Builder, ‘New Horizons’ series. Thames & Hudson, 1999
- Vivre en Égypte ancienne, collection « Découvertes Gallimard Texto » (nº 1). Éditions Gallimard, 1998
- Exercices corrigés de la petite grammaire de l’égyptien hiéroglyphique à l’usage des débutants, Librairie orientaliste Paul Geuthner, 1998
- Recherches sur l’histoire juridique, économique et sociale de l’ancienne Égypte. II, Institut français d’archéologie orientale, 1998
- Égypte pharaonique : Nouvelles recherches sur l’histoire juridique, économique et sociale de l’ancienne Égypte, collection « Droit et cultures » (nº 4). Éditions L’Harmattan, 2004
