= Persepolis (comics) =

Graphic novel series by Marjane Satrapi

- Covers of the English version of Persepolis Books 1 and 2
- Publisher: L'Association

Creative team
- Creator: Marjane Satrapi

Original publication
- Date of publication: 2000–2003
- Language: French

Translation
- Publisher: Pantheon Books
- Date: 2003 (Persepolis: The Story of a Childhood); 2004 (Persepolis 2: The Story of a Return)
- ISBN: 0-224-08039-3
- Translators: Blake Ferris, Mattias Ripa, Anjali Singh

Persepolis (French: Persépolis) is a series of autobiographical graphic novels written and illustrated by Marjane Satrapi. The books depict Satrapi's childhood and early adult years in Iran and Austria during and after the Iranian Revolution. The series is named after the ancient capital of the Persian Achaemenid Empire. Originally published in French, Persepolis has been translated to many other languages. As of 2018, the series has sold more than 2 million copies worldwide.

French comics publisher L'Association published the original work in four volumes between 2000 and 2003. Pantheon Books (North America) and Jonathan Cape (United Kingdom) published the English translations in two volumes – one in 2003 and the other in 2004. Omnibus editions in French and English followed in 2007, coinciding with the theatrical release of its film adaptation.

Due to its graphic language and images, Persepolis has caused controversy surrounding its presence in schools in the United States. The series was featured on the American Library Association's list of the "Top Ten Most Challenged Books" in 2014.

== Plot summary ==
=== Persepolis 1: The Story of a Childhood ===
Persepolis 1 begins by introducing Marjane, the ten-year-old protagonist. Set in 1980, the novel focuses on her experiences of growing up during the Islamic Revolution in Iran. Her story details the impact of war and religious extremism on Iranians, especially women. Belonging to an upper-middle-class family, Marji has access to various educational materials, such as books and a radio, which expose her to Western political thought at a very young age. By discovering the ideas of numerous philosophers, Marji reflects on her class privilege and is eager to learn about her family's political background. This inquiry inspired her to participate in popular demonstrations against the Shah's regime, in which people asked for his exile to safeguard their rights. Unfortunately, after the Shah's departure, Marji notices the rise of religious extremism in her society and is unhappy about it. Her uncle Anoosh's visit deepens her interest in politics when he tells her stories of being imprisoned as a communist revolutionary. His stories cause her to value ideas of equality and resistance. The new government then began to reform Iranian society, especially by having women cover themselves publicly and restricting social freedoms. Marji's family begins to fear for their lives since many of their friends and thousands of Iranians have fled the new regime to Europe or the US, but they resolve to stay. Anoosh is arrested again and accused of being a spy. He is executed for his political beliefs. Marji is upset that God did nothing to help her uncle and rejects her faith.

After an abrupt family vacation to Europe, Marji returns to Iran, where she learns from her grandmother that Iraq has invaded the country. As her hometown of Tehran comes under attack, she finds safety in her basement, which doubles as a bomb shelter. One night, the family hears the Iranian national anthem play on the TV, moving them to tears. It is later revealed that the government released the soldiers and air pilots from prison who were in jail for protesting. The soldiers agreed to fight on the condition that the country's national anthem be played on public broadcasting. Amidst the chaos of an ongoing war, her family secretly revolts against the new regime by having parties and consuming alcohol, which is prohibited in the country. Two years of war force Marji to explore her rebellious side by skipping classes, obsessing over boys, and visiting the black market that has grown due to the shortages caused by war and repression.

As the war intensifies, Marji rushes home one day to find that a long-range ballistic missile has hit her street. Her family escaped the missile as it hit the neighboring building, which housed their Jewish neighbors, the Baba Levys. She is traumatized by seeing her friend's dead body and expresses her anger against the Iranian political system. Her family begins to worry about her safety and decides to send her off to Austria for further study and to escape the war. The novel ends with her departure to Europe and the final sight of her mother fainting in her father's hands, unable to bear letting go of Marjane.

=== Persepolis 2: The Story of a Return ===
The second part of the series takes place in Vienna, where Marji starts her new life as a student at the Lycée Français de Vienne. She lives at a Catholic boarding house because her mother's friend has no room for her at her own apartment. Since she cannot speak German upon arrival, Marji finds it hard to communicate, but eventually overcomes it and makes friends. She assimilates into the culture by celebrating Christmas and going to Mass with her roommate. Away from home, Marji's Iranian identity deepens, and she is expelled from the boarding house after a verbal altercation with a nun who makes xenophobic comments against Marji.

Marji starts living with her friend Julie and her mother. Here, she experiences more culture shock when Julie talks about her sexual endeavors, as such topics are prohibited in Iran. Soon she undergoes a physical and ideological transformation by using drugs and changing her appearance while continuing to move house. Marji finally settles on a room with Frau Dr. Heller, but their relationship is unstable. Issues also arise in many of Marji's relationships, in which she finds comfort in drugs. She forms a relationship with Markus, but breaks up with him when she discovers that he has been cheating on her. Marji leaves Frau Dr. Heller's house after she accuses Marji of stealing her brooch. She spends the day on a park bench and ends up living on the streets for two months. When she catches bronchitis, she almost dies, but is found and taken to a hospital. Marji reaches out to her parents who arrange for her to move back and thus, after living in Vienna for four years, she returns to Tehran.

At the airport, she recognizes how different Iran is from Austria. Donning her veil once more to go out, she takes in the 65-foot murals of martyrs, rebel slogans, and the streets renamed after the dead. At home, her father tells her the horrors of the war, and they talk deep into the night about what she had missed. After hearing what her parents had gone through while she was away in Vienna, she resolves never to tell them of her time there. However, her trauma from Austria makes her fall into depression, causing her to attempt suicide twice. When she survives, she takes it as a sign to live and starts her process of recovery by looking after her health and taking up a job. She also begins art classes at the local university. However, due to the restrictions of showing female nudity, Marji and her friends attend secret sessions and parties, away from the prying eyes of the religious police.

Following her return to Iran, Marji meets Reza, also a painter, and they soon begin to date, but this proves to be frowned upon by the religious police. They are caught holding hands and their families are forced to pay a fine to avoid their lashings. In 1991, Reza proposes marriage to Marji, and after some contemplation, she accepts. Her mother, Taji, warns her that she has gotten married too young, and Marji soon realizes that she feels trapped in the role of wife. Marji attends a party, but someone warns them about the religious police. They quickly discard the alcohol and the women cover themselves as the police enter the building. The men make their escape by jumping from the rooftop, but Marji's friend Farzad hesitates and falls to his death. Later on in 1994, her marriage has deteriorated and Marji confides in her friend, Farnaz, that she no longer loves Reza and wants a divorce. Farnaz advises her to stay with her husband because divorced women are social outcasts, but her grandmother urges her to get a divorce. After much contemplation, Marji decides to separate from a reluctant Reza. She goes to her parents and tells them about her and Reza's divorce, and they comment on how proud they are of her and suggest that she should leave Iran permanently and live a better life back in Europe.

In late 1994 before her departure for Europe, Marji visits the countryside outside Tehran. She also visits the Caspian Sea, the grave of her grandfather, and the prison building where her uncle Anoosh is buried. In the autumn, Marji along with her parents and grandmother go to Mehrabad Airport for their final goodbye as she heads off to live in Paris. Marji then reveals that her grandmother died in 1996. The book ends with the message: "Freedom had a price."

== Character list ==
- Persepolis: The Story of a Childhood
  - Marjane (main character): nicknamed Marji, Marjane's life is depicted beginning with her early childhood. Growing up in Iran during the Iran-Iraq war, Marjane grows up in a family who is involved in the political unrest of Iran. This influences her world-view of oppression and its consequent rebellion. Eventually, her family sends her to Vienna in hopes of escaping the unrest of her home. Throughout her journey, she grows and matures while maintaining her rebellious nature, which sometimes gets her into trouble. Her family decides that she should leave Iran permanently, and she settles in Paris at the end of her story.
  - Mrs. Taji Satrapi (Marjane's mother): Taji is a passionate woman, who is upset with the way things are going in Iran, including the elimination of personal freedoms, and violent attacks on innocent people. She actively takes part in her local government by attending protests.
  - Mr. Satrapi, Ebi, or Eby (Marjane's father): He also takes part in many political protests with Taji. He takes photographs of riots, which was illegal and very dangerous, if caught. Both Mr. and Mrs. Satrapi come from a middle class background. This is important to note within the political and social context of their actions, values, and influences on their rebellious daughter.
  - Marjane's Grandmother: Marjane's grandmother develops a close relationship with Marjane. She enjoys telling Marjane stories of her past, and Marjane's grandfather.
  - Uncle Anoosh: Marjane's father's brother. He is executed by the new Islamic revolutionary authorities. His execution serves as a representation of the millions of activists who were killed under this regime.
  - Mehridia: Marjane's family maid who became friends with Marjane during her childhood. She had a secret relationship with the neighbor boy who was from a higher social class. The boy falls in love with her, but then abandons her when he learns of her social background.
  - Khosro: A man who makes fake passports. Marjane's father went to him when one of Marjane's uncles was suffering from heart trouble and needed surgery in England, but the hospital's director refused to send him abroad. Khosro shelters his relative Niloufar, who is wanted for her Communist beliefs. Unfortunately, Niloufar was spotted, arrested and executed, and Khosro was forced to flee to Turkey and was unable to finish the passport for Marjane's uncle. Khosro then settled in Sweden.
- Characters only in Persepolis: The Story of a Return
  - Julie: A friend and schoolmate of Marjane's who takes her in when she is kicked out of the Catholic boarding facility in Vienna. Raised by a single mother, Julie is four years older than Marjane and the two become close friends. Julie is already sexually active with different men and very open, blunt, and direct about sex, unlike teenage Marjane who is sexually timid and still a virgin.
  - Frau Dr. Heller: A former philosophy teacher who rents Marjane a room in her home. She has an unstable personality and accused Marjane of stealing her brooch, causing Marjane to leave.
  - Markus: Marjane's womanizing lover who cheats on her, and she breaks up with him.
  - Reza: Marjane's husband, who she had a socially strained relationship with. They were divorced after two years of marriage.

== Background ==
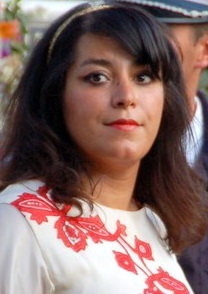
Marjane Satrapi in 2008

Marjane Satrapi's use of graphic novels to depict her own life events has made her reading easily accessible to people throughout the world. In an article titled "Why I wrote Persepolis", Satrapi says "Images are a way of writing. When you have the talent to be able to write and to draw, it seems a shame to choose only one. I think it's better to do both". Her first novel in this series, Persepolis: The Story of a Childhood, depicts her childhood experiences in Iran during the Islamic Revolution, while her subsequent novel, Persepolis 2: The Story of a Return, depicts her high school years in Vienna, Austria. Persepolis 2 also includes Satrapi's return to Iran where she attends college, marries, and later divorces before moving to France. Hence, the series is not only a memoir, but a Bildungsroman. Throughout both books, she focuses on the idea of "witnessing". Meaning, the motivation behind her writing involves describing her life from the viewpoint of someone viewing political and social chaos. This displays the "survival" aspect behind Satrapi as a young girl, and eventually young woman within this context. The influences of Satrapi's past education in Iran and Europe, and specifically German expressionism, can be felt throughout her writings and drawings as well. She seeks to create a visual context for not only those from the West, but also those from the Middle-East due to the lack of physical optics for this important time in history.

Both describe her life experiences of being Iranian and the way in which the Revolution shaped her life and the lives of her friends and family. The novel narrates "counter-historical narratives that are mostly unknown by a Western reading public."

Satrapi chose the name Persepolis, originating from the Ancient Greek term for Iran, in order to convey the message that the current state of Iran comes from thousands of years of background, not just recent hostile events.

After the writing and publication of Persepolis, Satrapi herself has transformed into a diplomat for her home country of Iran. She has "become a spokeswoman for greater freedom [in Iran], and a voice against war and for cross-cultural understanding".

== Genre and style ==
Persepolis is an autobiographical account of Satrapi's life in graphic novel form. While there is debate about the origin and definition of the term, modern graphic novels have been influenced by Art Spiegelman's Maus, which depicts Spiegelman's father's experience of the Holocaust with cartoon images of mice and cats. Later cartoonists like Aaron McGruder and Ho Che Anderson have also used graphic novels to explore social and political themes. The graphic novel has become a way for artists to examine critical matters by using illustrations to discuss foreign topics, such as those discussed in Persepolis.

Nima Naghibi and Andrew O'Malley, English professors at Ryerson University, believe that Persepolis is part of a larger movement of autobiographical books by Iranian women. However, literary critics point out that the book goes beyond conventional prose memoirs by serving as a work of "visual autofiction." According to theorist Philippe Lejeune, standard autobiographies usually depend on a clear "autobiographical pact" between the writer and reader. On the other hand, scholars who refer to the origins of autofiction, a term used by Serge Doubrovsky, assert that recalling a childhood entails an imaginative gap. Youth memories must be created through an understanding of time and emotional trauma, as they are not the most reliable historical records. Due to the combined effects of the Iranian Revolution, forced migration, and ultimate exile, Satrapi faces an even greater narrative divide.

Satrapi wrote Persepolis in a black-and-white format: "the dialogue, which has the rhythms of workaday family conversations and the bright curiosity of a child's questions, is often darkened by the heavy black-and-white drawings". To bridge the memory gaps, Satrapi uses a unique visual language characterized by minimalism and high-contrast artwork. She highlights the broken and incomplete nature of memories themselves by purposefully keeping panels minimal and leaving out complex elements. A visual tension between what is visible and what is hidden on the page is produced by the lack of shading, allowing readers to create their own interpretations of what is presented. According to academic Gillian Whitlock, the high-contrast, minimalist visual style offers a different set of tools for documenting history. In contrast to the strictly chronological confessions found in traditional biographies, Satrapi can use irony and satire to alleviate the horrors and pains of displacement by utilizing the comic frame. The use of a graphic novel has become much more predominant in the wake of events such as the Arab Spring and the Green Movement, as this genre employs both literature and imagery to discuss these historical movements. In an interview titled "Why I Wrote Persepolis", Marjane Satrapi said that "graphic novels are not traditional literature, but that does not mean they are second-rate."

Persepolis uses visual literacy through its comics to enhance the message of the text. Visual literacy stems from the belief that pictures can be "read." As defined by the Encyclopedia of the Social and Cultural Foundations of Education, "Visual literacy traces its roots to linguistic literacy, based on the idea that educating people to understand the codes and contexts of language leads to an ability to read and comprehend written and spoken verbal communication."

Due to the nature of artistic choices made in Persepolis by virtue of it being an illustrated memoir, readers have faced difficulty in placing it into a genre. The term "novel" most commonly refers to books that are fiction. Thus, there is some controversy surrounding how to classify the genre of Persepolis, being that it is non-fiction. Nima Naghibi and Andrew O'Malley, illustrate this by stating how bookstores have had issues with shelving Persepolis under a single label. Furthermore, scholars like Hillary Chute argue that Persepolis, like other similar books, should be called a "graphic narrative" instead of a "graphic novel." She argues that the stories these works contain are unique in themselves and challenge popular historical narratives. Chute explains that graphic narratives defy convention portraying complex narratives of trauma emphasize a different approach on discussing issues of "unspeakability, invisibility, and inaudibility that have tended to characterize recent trauma theory-as well as a censorship-driven culture at large." She adds that this technique of uncovering the invisible is an influential feminist symbol. Chute contends that Persepolis highlights this 'unseen' by appearing to be visually simplistic so that it can draw attention to the intense political events happening in the story.

Professor Liorah Golomb from the University of Oklahoma states about Persepolis and related books; "As time went on the comics still tended towards the autobiographical, but storytelling gained importance. Most of the women creating comics today are still doing so from a woman's point-of-view, but their target audience seems more universal.

An article from a journal on multicultural education written about teaching Persepolis in a middle school classroom acknowledges Satrapi's decision to use this genre of literature as a way for "students to disrupt the one-dimensional image of Iran and Iranian women." In this way, the story encourages students to skirt the wall of intolerance and participate in a more complex conversation about Iranian history, U.S. politics, and the gendered interstices of war." Satrapi utilizes a combination of the text and accompanying drawings to represent Iranian and European culture through both images and language, asserts Marie Otsby in an article for the Modern Language Association of America published in 2017.

== Analysis ==
Persepolis reminds readers of the "precarity of survival" in political and social situations.

=== Feminism in the East ===
Satrapi's graphic memoir contains themes concerning feminist ideals and the hegemonic power of the state. Satrapi uses the context of the Iranian Revolution to criticize the hypocrisy of state-enforced social pressures that seek to enact violence. During the Iranian Revolution, martyrdom had been nationalized by the state in order to encourage young men to participate in the revolution and strict social rules were forced upon women and were justified as protection. Satrapi's recount of her harassment by both male and female members of the Guardians of the Revolution because of her untraditional behavior and clothing exemplifies the hypocrisy of the state's beliefs. Although Satrapi criticizes the socio-political pressures, she does not fully dismiss her Iranian identity. Marji struggles with finding her identity because she is torn between a deep connection with her Iranian heritage and culture and the political and religious pressure enforced by the state. Satrapi's struggle with societal pressures is based on her belief that the Islamic state oppresses women when it regulates their expression and dictates their beliefs.

Jennifer Worth, an Adjunct Assistant Professor at Wagner College, presents that Satrapi uses the veil as a metaphor to describe the desire to control women. Worth proposes that the Guardians of the Revolution wield the cultural symbolism of the veil to oppress the social liberties of women, while Marji herself dons the symbolic veils of makeovers in Austria to escape social ostracization for her Iranian identity. Through her utilization of the veil as a symbol of concealing latent struggles, Satrapi contends that the confusion surrounding Marji's transition into adulthood stems from her complex beliefs and feelings about her Iranian heritage.

The portrayal of the veil in Persepolis has also been used to combat the Western perception that the veil is solely a symbol of oppression. The perceptions are challenged in the first chapter of Persepolis similarly titled "The Veil", where Satrapi illustrates young girls playing in the schoolyard with their veils. Lisa Botshon, a professor of English, and Melinda Plastas, a professor of Women and Gender studies, comment that Satrapi's depictions of the veil illuminate for Western audiences the extent of Middle Eastern women's agency. The depictions challenge the Western notion that women who wear the veil are helpless and victims of brutal social oppression.

Manuela Constantino's article, published as part of the University of Toronto Press, argues that Persepolis was released during a crucial time that aided its reception in North America. In 2003–04, tensions over invasion of Iraq were on the rise in the United States. At the same time, Persepolis started to circulate in the North American education system. It's possible that "its arrival could be read as a political attempt to shape an understanding of Middle Eastern cultural practices by presenting a liberal Middle Eastern viewpoint amidst radical unrest" Constantino speculates if Satrapi's memoir had anti-American or anti-Western sentiment, "would it have been so widely circulated and therefore so popular"? This makes Persepolis "easily accessible and seemingly transparent," Constantino states that these childlike reactions to the horrors they are exposed to bridge the gap between human and history. The complicated historical facts of war are broken down into easily understandable moments in history, and help people understand what is usually complex and culturally intricate into relatable and educational.

Mahdiyeh Ezzatikarami and Firouzeh Ameri of the International Journal of Applied Linguistics & English Literature published their article the strengths of Persepolis as a memoir. Telling the story from a child's point of view allows Satrapi to facilitate "supreme authenticity and immediacy" to her memoir. Satrapi created an identity that readers immediately relate and identify with. This is seen through her childish ways of coping with evil. When Marji's grandmother asks how she will install the rule of old people never feeling pain, Marji states she will simply forbid it.

=== Trauma and Child Psychology ===
Literary and psychological theorists analyze Persepolis to analyze how war and systemic political violence redefine a child's cognitive perspective. Satrapi displays how children process severe trauma through acute personal loss and the demise of childhood safe havens rather than through abstract warfare. Early on in the work, Marji finds tranquility in a deep connection with God as a method of coping with the chaos of society. However, a psychological turning point is reached when Anoosh, her cherished uncle and political role model, is executed. Her youthful innocence is ultimately destroyed by this loss, which leads her to openly reject God and face governmental terror from a mature, disillusioned perspective.

Satrapi also emphasizes how children's experiences of the tragedies of war are altered by socio-economic privileges. Marji's upper-middle-class background provides a safety net that less fortunate Iranian children cannot afford, even as the arising conflict robs her of her youth. The systematic inequality is explicitly juxtaposed through the "keys to paradise," which were plastic, gold-painted keys given out by the government to trick young, poor boys into clearing minefields with the assurance of an affluent afterlife. Because of her wealth, Marji's family can protect her from the front lines and eventually send her to Europe, while her peers belonging to the lower class are sent to instant destruction.

Nevertheless, fleeing from the war carries misery of its own. When Marji is forced to move alone to Vienna as a teenager, she experiences a significant emotional and geographical separation. Her remaining youth is completely stripped away from her by means of loneliness, discrimination, and survival in a foreign society, while away from her family. By balancing these turning points, Persepolis demonstrates that although being wealthy comes with many benefits, extended violence inevitably ruptures a child's developmental path, abruptly forcing maturity at a young age.

=== The Rebel Identity ===
Critics often use Marji's active resistance to totalitarian rule to examine Persepolis, portraying her maturation as an ongoing sequence of rebellions against the Islamic Republic. Satrapi highlights the political agency of her younger self, in contrast to narratives that portray citizens as helpless victims of tyranny. The state attempts to repeatedly use the classroom as the main location for ideological reeducation, which is where the resistance first appears. Researchers note that Marji consistently challenges this setting by refusing to memorize state-approved propaganda mindlessly. By publicly questioning her professors about the torture of political prisoners and correcting their rewritten historical narratives, Marji uses the leftist education of her parents to actively resist the government's efforts to control the stories of those left behind.

Furthermore, scholarly analyses highlight how Marji utilizes fashion and Western consumerism as instruments of political disobedience. Her purchase of illegal black-market items, including Iron Maiden and Kim Wilde cassette tapes, Nike sneakers, and a punk rock denim jacket, shifts from normal teenage materialism into dangerous acts of defiance in a setting where the state brutally enforces modesty laws and works to eradicate Western cultural influence. When approached by the female branch of the religious police, Marji's attire acts as a physical rejection of the regime's attempt to regulate female bodies. Critics argue that by appropriating these Western artifacts, Marji establishes an independent, industrialized identity in a public domain that requires uniform compliance.

As the plot progresses, Marji's disobedience evolves from ideological differences to purposeful rule-breaking that marks her maturation as she truly understands the reality she lives in. One of the most scrutinized instances of this internal battle is when she skips school and smokes her first cigarette. Literary theorists understand this behavior as a symbolic claim to adulthood in a society that offers young women very little authority over their own lives, rather than just as teenage anguish. She essentially asserts her independence from both her parents' rules and the oppressive authority of the state by smoking the cigarette in her basement, a secluded, underground area secure from governmental inspection.

Lastly, academics acknowledge that Marji's socioeconomic advantage is closely linked to her capacity to resist power. Because of their riches and social standing, her upper-middle-class family acts as a vital safety net, protecting her from the harsh penalties that impoverished Iranians endured for comparable offenses. However, this protective barrier is not indestructible. In the end, Marji's parents are forced to send her into exile to Austria due to her unwillingness to refrain from disobeying authorities, which culminates in a physical conflict with a school principal over a piece of jewelry. Despite being vital to her moral integrity and psychological survival, her rebellious nature ultimately costs her her homeland.

== Publication history ==
The original French series was published by L'Association in four volumes, one volume per year, from 2000 to 2003. Marie Ostby, professor at Connecticut College, noted that, David Beauchard, a co-founder of L'Association, strove to "create a forum for more culturally informed, self-reflective work," especially consisting of female writers. L'Association published Persepolis as one of their three "breakthrough political graphic memoirs." Persepolis, tome 1 ends at the outbreak of war; Persepolis, tome 2 ends with Marji boarding a plane for Austria; Persepolis, tome 3 ends with Marji putting on a veil to return to Iran; Persepolis, tome 4 concludes the work.

When the series gained critical acclaim, it was translated into many different languages. In 2003, Pantheon Books published parts 1 and 2 in a single volume English translation (with new cover art) under the title Persepolis which was translated by Blake Ferris and Mattias Ripa, Satrapi's Swedish husband and edited by Anjali Singh; parts 3 and 4 (also with new cover art) followed in 2004 as Persepolis 2, with the translation credited to Anjali Singh. In October 2007, Pantheon repackaged the two English language volumes in a single volume (with film tie-in cover art) under the title The Complete Persepolis. The cover images in the publications from both countries feature Satrapi's own artwork; however, the French publication is much less ornamented than the United States equivalent.

== Reception ==
=== Critical reception ===
Andrew Arnold of Time described Persepolis as "sometimes funny and sometimes sad but always sincere and revealing." Kristin Anderson of The Oxonian Review of Books of Balliol College, University of Oxford said, "While Persepolis' feistiness and creativity pay tribute as much to Satrapi herself as to contemporary Iran, if her aim is to humanise her homeland, this amiable, sardonic and very candid memoir couldn't do a better job."

=== Awards, lists, and impact ===
Persepolis has won numerous awards, including one for its text at the Angoulême International Comics Festival Prize for Scenario in Angoulême, France, and another for its criticism of authoritarianism in Vitoria, Spain. Marie Ostby points out that "Satrapi's work marks a watershed movement in the global history of the graphic novel," exemplified by the recent increase in use of the graphic novel as a "cross-cultural form of representation for the twenty-first century Middle East." Time magazine included Persepolis in its "Best Comics of 2003" list.

Despite the controversy surrounding the novel, Persepolis has turned into an important piece of literature which connects the Western and Iranian world. The graphic novel was awarded to Newsweek's Ten Best Fiction books list, and was created into a film in 2007. Reading Persepolis "lends itself to discussion of literary strategies and to teaching visual literacy, as well as to broader discussions of cultural difference as constructed in art and the media and as experienced in life".

Friere and Macedo argue that teaching Persepolis in a middle school classroom has proved to be beneficial in the development of students' literacy and critical thinking skills, which are necessary to help them interpret the world around them. In a journal article on how to teach Persepolis in a post 9/11 classroom, Lisa Botshon and Melinda Plastas from the University of Illinois assert that Persepolis offers a platform for students to question Western stereotypes and fear surrounding the Middle East. Another study that was done also showed that Persepolis has greatly impacted the thinking skills of middle school students who were taught it in their ELA classroom. Despite the images and easy-to-read text, Persepolis is also often taught at the high school level because high-school aged students would be able to take the information learned and thoroughly discuss it to enhance their literary skills. From writing about her life and the people in it, Satrapi's writing also denies the typical assumptions made by the world about Western Iranian women. Friere and Macedo believe that the way women and Iranian society in general are presented in the book can help students come to doubt their perceived sense of national insecurity when it comes to the Middle East.

In 2019, the graphic novel was ranked 47th on The Guardian's list of the 100 best books of the 21st century. In 2024, it was ranked 48th of the 100 best books of the 21st century by the New York Times.

=== Censorship in the United States ===
Despite the positive reviews, Persepolis faced some attempts at censorship in school districts across the United States. In March 2013, the Chicago Public Schools ordered copies of Persepolis to be removed from seventh-grade classrooms after Chicago Public Schools CEO Barbara Byrd-Bennett determined that the book "contains graphic language and images that are not appropriate for general use". Upon hearing about the proposed ban, upperclassmen at Lane Tech High School in Chicago flocked to the library to check out Persepolis and organized demonstrations in protest. CPS reinstituted the book in school libraries and classrooms.

In 2014, the book faced three different challenges across the United States, which led to its placement as #2 on the ALA's list of "Top Ten Most Challenged Books of 2014". The first of these controversies occurred in Oregon's Three Rivers School District, where a parent insisted on the removal of the book from its high school libraries due to the "coarse language and scenes of torture". The book remained in libraries without any restriction after school board meetings to discuss this challenge. Another case of censorship arose in central Illinois' Ball-Chatham School District, where a student's parent stated that the book was inappropriate for the age group assigned. The parent also inquired into why Persepolis was assigned to the students to read on September 11. Despite this opposition, the school board unanimously voted to keep the book both in the school libraries and within the curriculum. The third case occurred in Smithville, Texas, where parents and members of the school community challenged the book being taught in Smithville High School's World Geography Class. They voiced concerns about "the newly-introduced Islamic literature available to students". The school board met to discuss this issue at a meeting on February 17, 2014, after a formal complaint was filed against the book. The board voted 5–1 to retain the novel.

In 2015, Crafton Hills College, in Yucaipa, California, also witnessed a challenge to the incorporation of Persepolis in its English course on graphic novels. After her completion of the class, a critical student described Persepolis as pornographic and lacking in quality. Crafton Hills administrators released a statement, voicing strong support of academic freedom, and the novel was retained.

In 2022, Franklin Regional High School, located near Pittsburgh, Pennsylvania, paused teaching of Persepolis after complaints to the district. The book was reinstated to the curriculum as of a meeting on March 31, 2022.

In 2024, Persepolis and Persepolis 2 were listed by the Florida Department of Education among around 700 books that were "removed of discontinued" from public schools during the 2023-2024 school year by one of Florida's school boards.

== Other ==
=== Film ===
Persepolis has been adapted into an animated film, by Sony Pictures Classics. The film was co-directed by Marjane Satrapi and Vincent Paronnaud. It was voiced by Catherine Deneuve, Chiara Mastroianni, Danielle Darrieux and Simon Abkarian. Debuting at the 2007 Cannes Film Festival, Persepolis won the Jury Prize but also drew complaints from the Iranian government before its screening at the festival. It was nominated for an Academy Award in 2007 for best animated feature. The film has also received high honors, specifically, in 2007, when it was named the Official French Selection for the Best Foreign Language Film.

=== Persepolis 2.0 ===
Persepolis 2.0 is an updated version of Satrapi's story, created by different authors who combined Satrapi's illustrations with new text about the 2009 Iranian presidential election. Only ten pages long, Persepolis 2.0 recounts the re-election of President Mahmoud Ahmadinejad on June 12, 2009. Done with Satrapi's permission, the authors of the comic are two Iranian-born artists who live in Shanghai and who give their names only as Payman and Sina. The authors used Satrapi's original drawings, changing the text where appropriate and inserting one new drawing, which has Marjane telling her parents to stop reading the newspaper and instead turn their attention to Twitter during the protests.

Persepolis 2.0 was published online, originally on a website called "Spread Persepolis"; an archived version is available online.

== See also ==
- List of feminist comic books
- Portrayal of women in comics
