= Nicolas Ancion =

Belgian writer

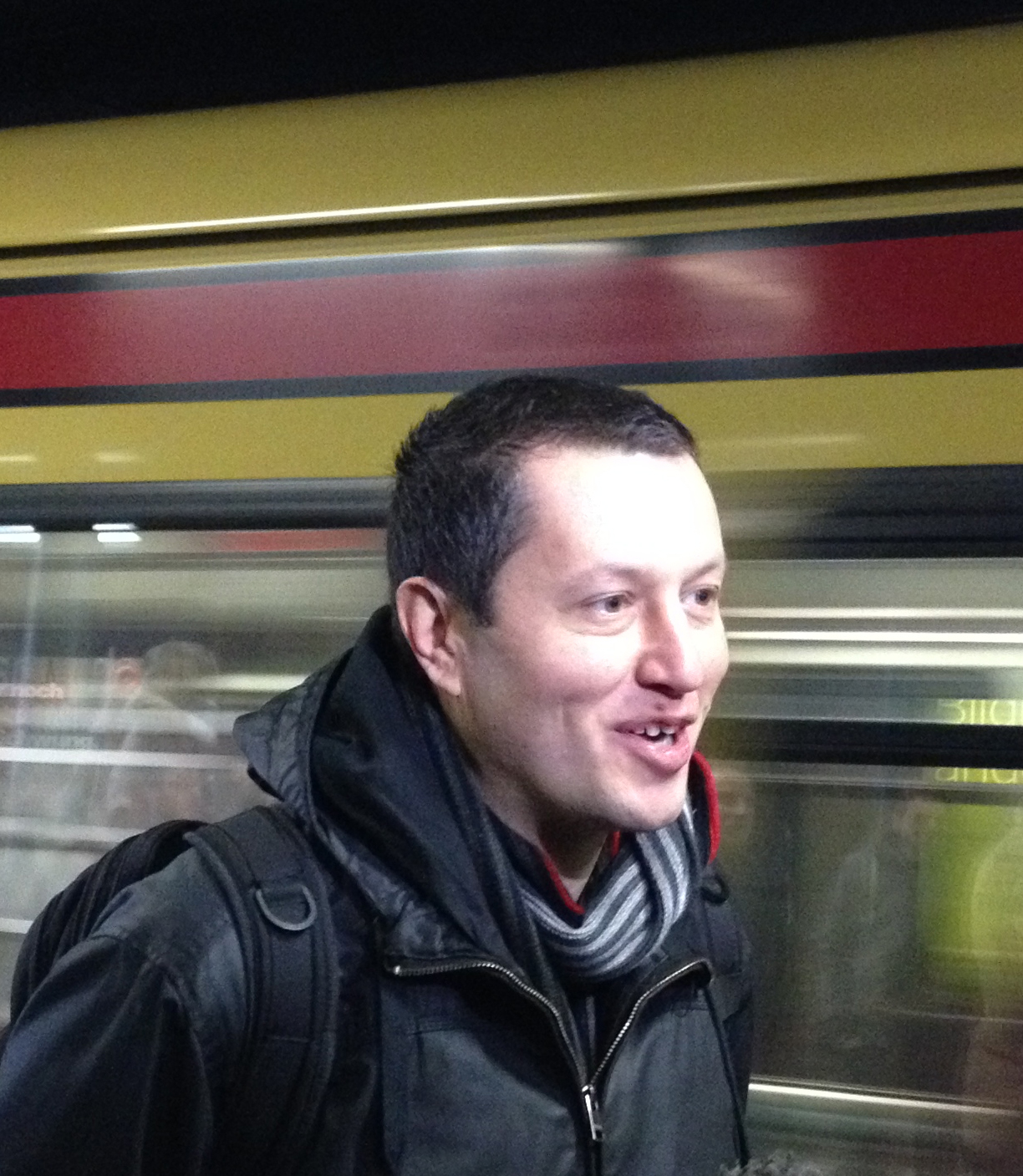
- Born: 23 May 1971 (age 55); Liège, Wallonia, Belgium
- Occupations: Novelist; Short story writer
- Writing career
- Language: French
- Genre: Poetry
- Website: nicolasancion.com

Nicolas Ancion (French pronunciation: [nikɔla ɑ̃sjɔ̃]) is a Belgian writer born in Liège, Wallonia, Belgium, in 1971. His parents were professional puppeteers.

== Writer ==
He writes fiction for adults, young adults and children and is the author of several theater plays and poetry collections Humour is an essential ingredient in his works. The literary supplement of Le Monde, France's flagship daily newspaper, dubbed him "Lewis Carol's true heir".

He loves literary challenges and performances: he wrote a novel in public in 24 hours during the Brussels Book Fair (March 2010) and regularly uses web tools to share live writing.

== Novel ==
His novel, "The 35-billion Euro Man" has been awarded the prix Rossel des jeunes in 2009. This novel describes the abduction of one of the richest men in the world, Lakshmi Mittal, CEO of ArcelorMittal. This novel is currently being adapted for the theater and the movies.

== Bibliography in English ==
- The Man Who Refused To Die, novel illustrated by Patrice Killoffer, Dis Voir, 2010

== Bibliography in French ==
- L'homme qui refusait de mourir, novel illustrated by Patrice Killoffer, Dis Voir, 2010
- J'arrête quand je veux, novel, Jourdan jeunesse, 2010
- L'homme qui valait 35 milliards, novel, Luc Pire - Le Grand Miroir, 2009 - Victor Rossel Young Readers Awards 2009
- Retrouver ses facultés, short stories illustrated by Pierre Kroll, Éditions de l'ULG, 2009
- Le garçon qui avait avalé son lecteur mp3, novel, Averbode, 2008
- Nous sommes tous des playmobiles, short stories, Le Grand Miroir, 2007 (Franz de Wever Award - paperback : Pocket 2008)
- Le poète fait sa pub, Bookleg, poems, Maelström, 2006 (Prix Gros Sel Award 2006)
- Carrière solo, novel, Labor, 2006
- Métro, boulot, dodo, poems, L’arbre à paroles, 2006
- Dans la cité Volta, novel, CFC, 2005
- Le garçon qui avait mangé un bus, novel, Averbode, 2004
- Haute pression, novel, Le Grand Miroir, 2004
- Le dortoir, poems, Éditions le Fram, 2004
- Les ours n’ont pas de problème de parking, short stories, Le Grand Miroir, 2001 (paperback : Pocket 2009)
- Quatrième étage, novel, Luc Pire, 2000 (Prix des Lycéens 2001 - paperback : Pocket 2010)
- 39 doigts et 4 oreilles, poems illustrated by Frédéric Hainaut, Les éperonniers, 1998
- Écrivain cherche place concierge, novel, Luc Pire, 1998 (paperback : Pocket 2010)
- Le cahier gonflable, novel, L'Hèbe/les éperonniers, 1997
- Ces chers vieux monstres, poésie, Éditions Unimuse, 1997
- Ciel bleu trop bleu, roman, L'Hèbe, 1995 (Prix Jeunes Talents de la Province de Liège)
