= Epileptic (comics) =

French comic

Epileptic (L'Ascension du haut mal)
- No. of issues: 6
- Publisher: L'Association

Creative team
- Creator: David Beauchard

Original publication
- Date of publication: 1996–2003
- Language: French
- ISBN: 2-909020-73-8

Translation
- Publisher: Fantagraphics; Pantheon
- Date: 2002–2005
- ISBN: 2-84414-085-8
- Translator: Kim Thompson

L'Ascension du Haut Mal ("The Ascension of Great Suffering"), published in English as Epileptic, is an autobiographical graphic novel by David Beauchard (more commonly known as David B.).

== Publication history ==
It was originally published in French by L'Association in six volumes from 1996 to 2003:

- Tome 1, 1996, 52 pp. (ISBN 2-909020-73-8)
- Tome 2, 1997, 60 pp. (ISBN 2-909020-84-3)
- Tome 3, 1998, 52 pp. (ISBN 2-84414-004-1)
- Tome 4, 1999, 52 pp. (ISBN 2-84414-020-3)
- Tome 5, 2000, 60 pp. (ISBN 2-84414-047-5)
- Tome 6, 2003, 86 pp. (ISBN 2-909020-07-X)

The first half of the series was published in English by Fantagraphics in one volume in 2002 (ISBN 2-84414-085-8); a complete edition was released by Pantheon in 2005 (ISBN 978-0375714689).

== Plot ==
The book tells the story of the author's early childhood and adolescence, focusing on his relationship with his older brother and younger sister. His brother develops severe and intractable epilepsy, causing the family to seek a variety of solutions from alternative medicine, most dramatically by moving to a commune based on macrobiotic principles. As the epileptic brother loses control of his own life, the artist develops solitary obsessions with cartoons, mythology and war. The book's graphic style becomes increasingly elaborate as the children's fantasy life takes over, with their dreams and fears (including epilepsy itself) appearing as living creatures. In brief interludes, the children appear as adults when the artist begins the process of writing the story.

== Translation ==
The French title proved difficult to translate, as it contains several meanings: haut mal is an archaic term for epilepsy meaning literally "great sickness" (formerly used as a medical term in English, now replaced by grand mal), and ascension can mean either rise or climbing, as seen in a recurring image of the family climbing a steep slope into unknown terrain.

== Reception ==
Publishers Weekly has called it "one of the greatest graphic novels ever published."

== Awards ==
The fourth volume won the 2000 Angoulême International Comics Festival Prize for Scenario. David B. won the 2005 Ignatz Award for Outstanding Artist for his work on the series.
