= Patrice Killoffer =

French comics artist

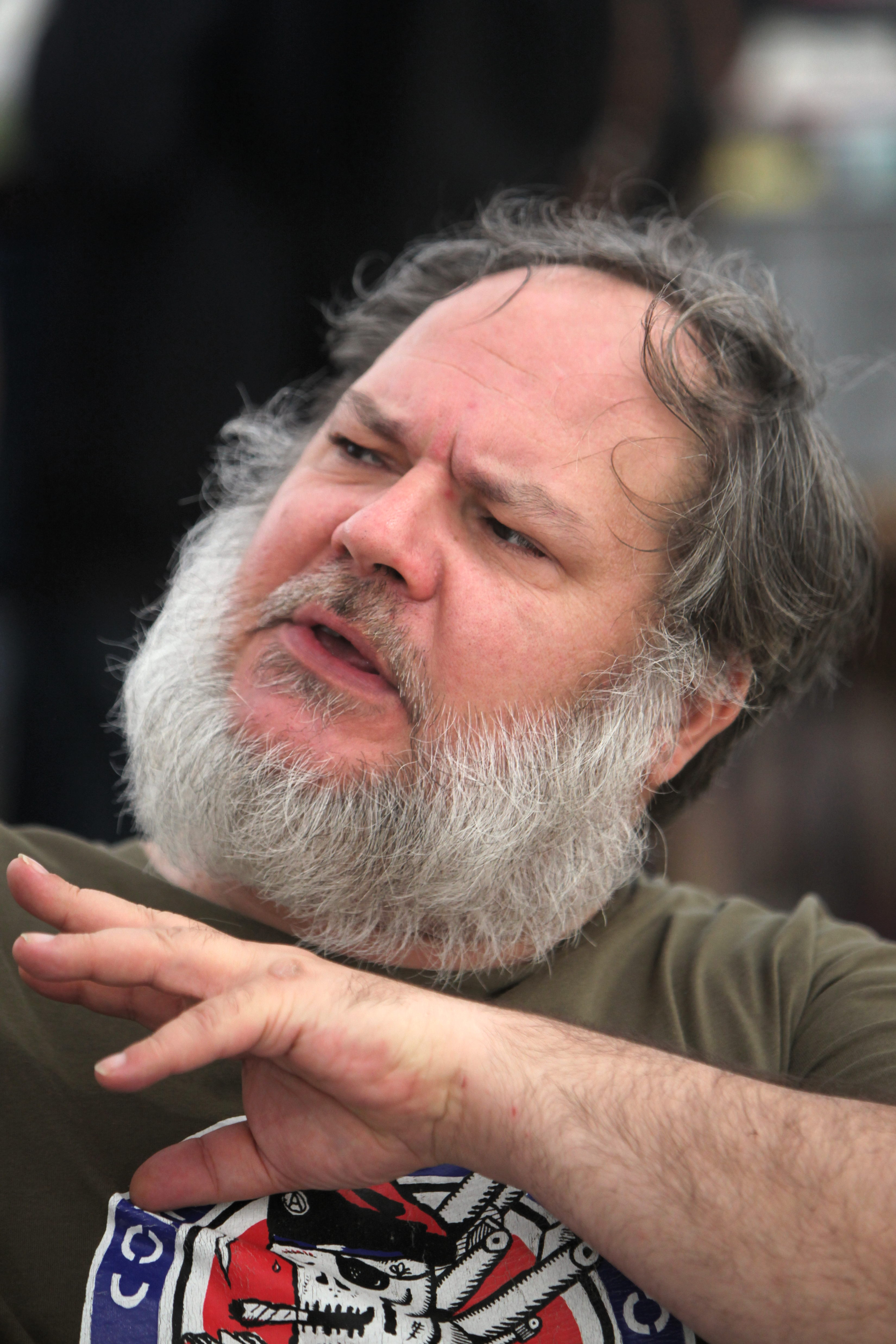
- Patrice Killoffer at BDFil 2021
- Born: 16 June 1966 (age 60) Metz, France
- Areas: Cartoonist, Writer, Artist

Patrice Killoffer, better known simply as Killoffer (born 16 June 1966), is a writer and artist of comics. He was co-founder of the independent comics publisher L'Association in 1990, and has been a part of Oubapo since its creation in 1992.

== Career ==
Patrice Killoffer studied at the School for Applied Arts Duperré in Paris in the 1980s. His teachers included comics authors Georges Pichard and Yves Got, who influenced him in his early works. He created his first pages in 1981, during his studies.

In 1987, he made the first issue of the magazine Pas un seul with Jean-Yves Duhoo. In the following years, he published in the magazines Globof, Lynx, and Labo, which was published by Futuropolis. Since 1990, he publishes regularly in Lapin, the magazine of publisher L'Association, which later published three of his albums.

More recently, he has published in the magazine Psikopat and he produces illustrations for the newspapers Libération and Le Monde, and writes a column for La Vie. In 2000, he was one of three artists responsible for the carnaval at Saint-Denis. Since 2006, he is the illustrator of the books of Fantômette, a classic French series of youth literature. Killoffer also created four stamps for the Swiss Post in 2006, making him the first foreign artist to design Swiss stamps.

Some of his works have been translated into Dutch and German. 676 Apparitions of Killoffer is his first work to be translated in English.

== Influences ==
Apart from his teachers, Killoffer cites as his influences the Dutch artists Willem and Joost Swarte. He also admires the work of Moebius. But despite these ligne claire influences, he is considered as the most experimental author of L'Association.

== Awards ==
- 2003: nominated for the Award for Best Comic Book at the Angoulême International Comics Festival, France
- 2005: nominated for the Award for Best Artwork at the Angoulême International Comics Festival

== Bibliography ==
- Killoffer en la matière, L'Association, 1992
- ?, Automne 67, 1994
- Billet SVP, L'Association, 1995
- La Clef des champs, L'Association, 1997
- La Bactérie, Les 4 mers, 1998
- Viva Pâtàmâch ! (art), with Jean-Louis Capron (text), Le Seuil, 2001
- Six cent soixante-seize apparitions de Killoffer (676 apparitions of Killoffer), L'Association, 2002, published in English in 2005 by Typocrat Press, published in Italien in 2017 by Coconino Press
- Donjon Monsters part 9 : Les Profondeurs (art), with Lewis Trondheim and Joann Sfar (text), Delcourt
- Le Rock et si je ne m'abuse le roll, L'Association, 2006
- Quand faut y aller, L'Association, 2006
- Léon l'étron, Thierry Magnier, 2007
- The Man Who Refused To Die, with Nicolas Ancion, Dis Voir, 2010
