= Diego Aranega =

French cartoonist (born 1970)

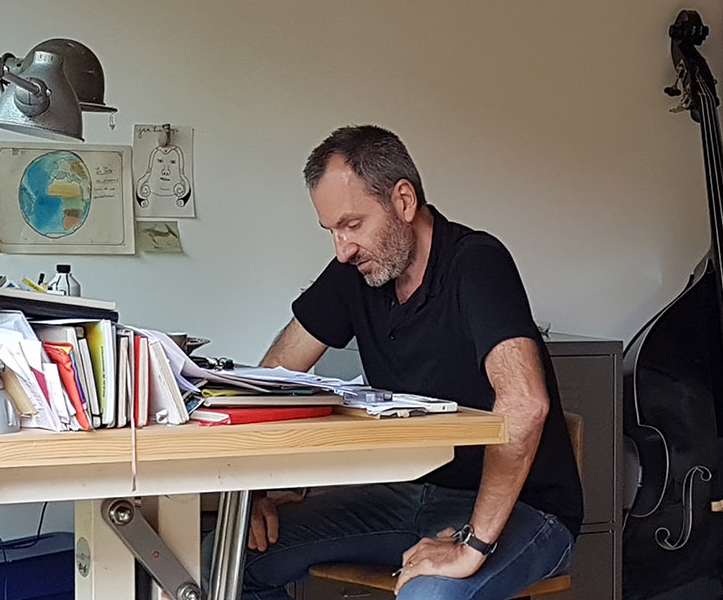
Diego Aranega

Diego Aranega (born 1970) is a French editorial cartoonist and comic artist, who was born to a Croatian mother and a Spanish Pied-Noir father.

== Biography ==
After completing his studies at the National School of Fine Arts, Paris in 1994, Diego Aranega worked as an illustrator for various French newspapers and also worked in advertising and publishing.

Focu, his first comic book hero, was created in 1993 and quickly became the mascot of XL magazine. Focu is a hypocrite who cannot resist saying what he thinks to those around him, based on the structure, "you wouldn't say/you would say". By using politically correct imagery in his turn of phrase, Focu manages to express ferocious criticism by making his point sound like a compliment to the subject. As for Victor Lalouz, he is an antihero who embodies the loser in all its splendour. Unaware of his failings, Victor Lalouz is as pure as his world view is positive. He seems to gather flaws, both at intellectual and physical levels, and completely ignores figurative meaning. Although he has no understanding of the third degree, Victor Lalouz nevertheless has significant ambition. This antihero represents the antithesis of someone who is motivated by specific targets. However, Victor Lalouz will not only achieve but surpass these targets due to his superhuman determination.

Diego Aranega also features in stories alongside his friends Lefred-Thouron, Yan Lindingre and Jochen Gerner. These stories appear regularly in Fluide Glacial and L'Équipe magazines.
