= Léo Quievreux =

French comic book creator

Léo Quievreux (also known as Pik; born 1971) is a French author and illustrator of comic books, and founder of publisher Éditions Gotoproductions.

== Early life and education ==
Quievreux was born in Mulhouse in the Alsace region of France, in 1971. He studied applied arts in at École Estienne and École Duperré in Paris, from 1990 to 1993.

== Career ==
Quievreux was a key artist in the French alternative comic book scene of the 1990s, known as "la nouvelle bande dessinée", and founded and ran his own publication house, Gotoproduction, which he ran along with Jean Kristau and Anne-Fred Maurer from 1991 to 2000 or 2001, and which published over 60 books.

Since 1997, his drawings have been regularly published by several well-known publishers of comic books: Marseille publisher Le Dernier Cri; L'Association in Paris, and Lyon-based Arbitraire (since its establishment in 2005); and, since 2015, by Éditions Matière in Montreuil.

His work has been published in many French as well as international publications, such as Libération, Le Monde, Enjeux les Échos, La Revue Dessinée, Crachoir, Strapazin (Switzerland), Kus! (Latvia), Stripburger (Slovenia), Good Stuff, Erogotoshitashi, Today in English, and many others.

In March 2022, Quiévreux's story "Aquarium" was published in the third issue of revived iconic comics anthology series Métal Hurlant.

As of February 2022 he lives in Pau.

== Music ==
In 1995 he formed a musical duo with the artist Mika Pusse, called Pikpus, and since then has undertaken various experimental music projects under the name Pik. He played with the group Dragibus from 1998 to 2003, touring Japan in 2000 and 2003.

== Selected works ==
=== Immersion ===
Three volumes of the Immersion series had been published by June 2021, all in black and white:

- Le programme immersion (Éditions Matière, September 2015) (ISBN 9782916383507
- Immersion (Éditions Matière, November 2018) ISBN 9782916383576
- Spécimens (Éditions Matière, May 2021) ISBN 9782916383644

The Immersion Program was published in English by Floating World Comics in 2019. The series is science fiction, in which a frightening new technology that steals memories is used as a weapon by a sinister organisation called "The Agency". Quievreux said that the film Tinker Tailor Soldier Spy (La Taupe in French) by Tomas Alfredson inspired him to write a noir novel, along the lines of James Ellroy or David Peace.

=== Other works ===
Quievreux has published over 20 works in many countries. Other works by him include:

- La Mue (with Tanguy Ferrand), 2007
- La Prothèse HRZ, 2008
- Agents dormants, L'Association, 2008
- Sphynx song (with J. M. Bertoyas), L'Association, 2012
- Le Mystère HB. Une Histoire du 36 Quai des Orfèvres (with Alain Gillot, Pierre Dragon & Claude Cancès), 2012)
- Cocaine 14, 2014
- Climat, la guerre de l'ombre, illustrations for a book by Yannick Jadot, MEP, 2014
- Anyone 40, 2016, "a series of experimental stories in comic book form"
- Ex Cop, 2018
- Fake, 2020 (published by Bellezza Infinita in Spain)
- George Profond, Le Monte en L'Air, 2023

== Exhibitions ==
Quevreux's work has been shown in exhibitions all over Europe, including:

- Librairie Un Regard Moderne, Paris, 2005
- Galerie Kurt Im Hirsch, Berlin, 2006
- Fumetto Festival, Lucerne, Switzerland, 2007
- Le Bal des Ardents, Lyon, 2009
- Festival Ligatura, Poznań, Poland, 2010
- Survival Kit Festival, Riga, Latvia, 2011
- Festival Monstre, Geneva, Switzerland, 2016
- Rencontres du 9ème Art, Aix-en-Provence, France, 2016
- Galerie Papiers Gras, Geneva, 2017/2018
