= Oubapo =

Comics movement

Oubapo (French pronunciation: [ubapo], short for French: Ouvroir de bande dessinée potentielle; roughly translated as "workshop of potential comic book art") is a comics movement which believes in the use of formal constraints to push the boundaries of the medium. OuBaPo is styled after the French literary movement Oulipo (Ouvroir de Littérature Potentielle), founded by Raymond Queneau and François Le Lionnais. Oubapo was founded in November 1992 in the Ou-X-Po and announced in L'Association's French comics edition.

== Meaning of the name ==
The term "ouvroir," originally used in conjunction with works of charity, was reused by Queneau for a blend of "ouvroir" and "œuvre" ("work") and roughly corresponds to the English "workshop." The term "potential" is used in the sense of that which is possible, or realisable if one follows certain rules. Thus, "OuBaPo" can be roughly translated as "Potential Comics Workshop."

== Constraints ==
Some OuBapoian constraints:

Reduction
A book or comic summarized in very few panels
Reversibility
A comic that can be read back to front
Iconic alliteration
The same drawing reproduced throughout the whole comic with only the words changing

== History ==
By the late 1980s, cartoonist Lewis Trondheim had established a reputation for his various conceptual comics, such as Le dormeur and Psychanalyse, both of which were created entirely with a single photocopied panel. Similarly, Bleu and La nouvelle pornographie were both billed as "abstract comic books." After completing Psychanalyse, Trondheim was challenged by fellow cartoonist Jean-Christophe Menu to write a story with only four panels, drawn by Menu. After some strips, Trondheim asked for four more panels, and wrote the highly dense comic book, Moins d'un quart de seconde pour vivre. The constrained writing results, reminiscent of OuLiPo writers, became the basis for OuBaPo. (During this period, Trondheim, Menu, and a few other cartoonists had also co-founded the publisher L'Association, which later published many of the group's books.)

Menu, Trondheim, six other cartoonists, and comic-book historian Gilles Ciment often frequented the Parisian artists' studio Nawak (French slang for "nonsense"), where they discussed comic book constraints over snacks and beer. The group founded OuBaPo under the mantra that "constraints free the artistic mind."

Over the course of the next decade, the nine founding members met three times a year and worked on various constraints. OuBaPo created a board game called "Scroubabble" — based on Scrabble but with comic-book panels instead of letters. They also created a comic-book tale that repeated itself endlessly. Their first collection of works, OuPus 1, was published in 1997; three more OuPus books were published between 2003–2005. In addition, the group held several exhibitions in Paris.

In 2005, Trondheim and Menu had a falling out over the direction of the group, with Trondheim leaving the group in the fall of 2006. In 2007, another one of the founders quit after a disagreement with Menu. In 2008, founder Ciment (director of a French cultural center dedicated to comics) left after also arguing with Menu.

In November 2010, an OuBaPo delegation went to Rennes to celebrate Oulipo's 50th anniversary. There, the OuBaPo members played Scroubabble before a live audience.

== Membership ==
A very select group, there is no membership application to OuBaPo. Candidates are singled out and elected by unanimous acclimation of the existing members. The group's nine current members live in France, the United States, Spain, and Switzerland. American cartoonist Matt Madden is OuBaPo's "U.S. correspondent."

=== Founding members ===
- François Ayroles
- Anne Baraou
- Gilles Ciment — no longer a member
- Jochen Gerner
- Thierry Groensteen
- Patrice Killoffer
- Étienne Lécroart
- Jean-Christophe Menu
- Lewis Trondheim — no longer a member

== Books published ==
- OuPus 1 (L'Association, 1997)
- OuPus 2 (L'Association, 2003)
- OuPus 3 (L'Association, 2004)
- OuPus 4 (L'Association, 2005)
- OuPus 5 (L'Association, 2014)
- OuPus 6 (L'Association, 2015)

== See also ==
- Ouxpo
- Constrained comics
