= L'Association =

French comic book publisher

- Status: Active
- Founded: May 1990
- Founder: Jean-Christophe Menu, Lewis Trondheim, David B., Mattt Konture, Patrice Killoffer, Stanislas, Mokeït
- Country of origin: France
- Headquarters location: Paris, France
- Publication types: Comics
- Fiction genres: Alternative
- Official website: www.lassociation.fr

L'Association is a French publishing house located in Paris which publishes comic books. It was founded in May 1990 by Jean-Christophe Menu, Lewis Trondheim, David B., Mattt Konture, Patrice Killoffer, Stanislas, and Mokeït.

L'Association is one of the most important publishers to come out of the new wave of Franco-Belgian comics in the 1990s, and remains highly regarded. They were among the first to publish authors such as Joann Sfar and Marjane Satrapi, and also are known for publishing French translations of the work of North American cartoonists like Julie Doucet and Jim Woodring.

Mon Lapin quotidien (MLQ, formerly Lapin and Mon Lapin) is the group's magazine.

== History ==
The forerunner of the association was founded in 1984 as "Aanal", or Association pour l’Apologie du 9e Art Libre. Various other structures were set up by the founding members, and in 1990 they decided to return to an independent organisational structure, based on Aanal. At the time, the comics industry dominated by a number of large publishers who did not publish comic books exclusively. Similar to alternative comics in North America at the time, L’Association focused published works based on reality-based, and exclusively in black and white.

L’Association (à la Pulpe) was founded in May 1990 by seven young cartoonists struggling to find an outlet for their work: Jean-Christophe Menu, Lewis Trondheim, David B., Mattt Konture, Patrice Killoffer, Stanislas, and Mokeït (who left soon afterwards to follow a fine art career, returning in 2009). They named their venture "Atelier Nawak" (later the "Atelier des Vosges"), with the publishing branch being L'Association.

The first major hit published by L'Association was Persepolis, by Marjane Satrapi, published from 1999–2004.

One of L'Association's most distinctive works was the seminal black-and-white anthology Comix 2000 which includes work from over 300 creators from 29 countries in one 2,000-page hardcover volume. In addition to L'Association's founders, notable contributors to Comix 2000 included Jessica Abel, Edmond Baudoin, Nick Bertozzi, Émile Bravo, Mike Diana, Julie Doucet, Renée French, Tom Hart, Dylan Horrocks, Megan Kelso, James Kochalka, Étienne Lécroart, Brian Ralph, Ron Regé, Jr., Joann Sfar, R. Sikoryak, Chris Ware, Skip Williamson, and Aleksandar Zograf.

Other creators published by L'Association included Dupuy and Berberian, Lewis Trondheim, Joann Sfar, Blutch, Anke Feuchtenberger, Emmanuel Guibert, François Ayroles, Jochen Gerner, and Guy Delisle.

By 2005, many of L'Association's founders and creators had begun also publishing in France's "mainstream" industry. That year co-founder Menu published Plates-bandes, a diatribe against what he perceived as the co-opting and wholesale copycatting of the alternative comics aesthetic by France's mainstream comic book publishers looking to corner what had suddenly become a lucrative market. Literally meaning "flowerbeds", the title is a pun involving part of the word for comics ("bande dessinée," or "drawn strip"), a concern that independent comics are headed for blandness and platitude ("plat," literally flat or insipid), and a gauntlet thrown down to mainstream publishers for encroaching on indie territory (the colloquial expression "trampling someone's flowerbeds" means to step on someone's toes).

The book coincided with three of the original founders and a few authors leaving L'Association: David B. left the group in spring 2005; Lewis Trondheim left in autumn 2006, followed shortly after by Stanislas and Killoffer. (At that point, L'Association's "editorial board" was dissolved, since it was originally composed of the company's founders.) This left Menu as sole director of L’Association. Although he had been the driving force, there had been dissatisfaction with his lack of collaborative approach. Konture remained loyal and stayed on, but was not involved in operations. It was managed by Menu and a board of directors who had been in place since 1993: Patricia Perdrizet as president, Isabelle “Zab” Chipot as secretary, and Laetitia Zuccarelli as treasurer.

In May 2011, after nearly six months of debate Menu announced his official departure from L'Association, and Stanislas also left, leaving only Mattt Konture from the original group. Shortly afterwards, co-founders David B., Killoffer, and Trondheim returned to the publishing house, as president, secretary, and treasurer respectively. A new editorial committee was created, comprising Konture, David B., Killoffer, François Ayroles, Jochen Gerner, Étienne Lécroart, Lisa Mandel et Jérome Mulot, with Céline Merrien as president.

== Lapin ==
In 1992 L'Association launched a magazine/anthology called Lapin (referencing Menu's Lapot), initially a bulletin reporting on internal information about the organisation. It appeared quarterly from issue 9 in October 1995, and then continued to appear erratically over the years, publishing a variety of experimental graphic works. It was resurrected from a period of dormancy in 2007 as a platform for emerging authors, which gave exposure to people such as Lisa Mandel, Nine Antico, and Matthias Picard.

In September 2013, Lapin was relaunched as Mon Lapin, and was published under this name until November 2014. In 2017, it was relaunched as Mon Lapin quotidien (MLQ) as a large format (41 cm (16 in) by 58 cm (23 in)) magazine, in its sixth series, starting with issue 1. Its appearance follows that of an ordinary mainstream newspaper, but its title is misleading: it is not published daily (quotidien), but quarterly.

== Recognition and awards ==
L'Association has won numerous awards at the Angoulême International Comics Festival.

== Today ==
L'Association is one of the most important publishers to come out of the new wave of Franco-Belgian comics in the 1990s, and remains highly regarded.

== Titles (by author) ==
=== Anthologies ===
- Comix 2000 (2000)
- Oubapo
  - OuPus 1 (1997)
  - OuPus 2 (2003)
  - OuPus 3 (2004)
  - OuPus 4 (2005)

=== Edmond Baudoin ===
- Le portrait (re-issue of 'Baudoin, collection 30x40, originally published by Futuropolis in 1990)
- coll. Eperluette
  - Éloge de la poussière (1995)
  - Terrains vagues (1996)
- coll. Patte de Mouche
  - Made in U.S. (1995)
  - Nam (1998)
- coll. Ciboulette
  - Le voyage (1996)
  - Salade niçoise (1999)
- Le chemin de Saint-Jean (2002)
- Araucaria, carnets du Chili (collection Mimolette, 2004)
- Couma acò (2005; re-issue, originally published by Futuropolis in 1991)
- Crazyman (2005)
- L'Espignole (2006)

=== David B. ===
- le Cheval blême (1992)
- le Cercueil de course (1993)
- L'ascension du haut mal
  - Vol. 1 (1996, ISBN 2-909020-73-8)
  - Vol. 2 (1997, ISBN 2-909020-84-3)
  - Vol. 3 (1998, ISBN 2-84414-004-1)
  - Vol. 4 (1999, ISBN 2-84414-020-3)
  - Vol. 5 (2000, ISBN 2-84414-047-5)
  - Vol. 6 (2003, ISBN 2-909020-07-X)
- la Bombe familiale (1997, ISBN 2-909020-78-9)
- L'Association en Égypte (with Golo, Edmond Baudoin, Jean-Christophe Menu) (1998)
- Maman a des problèmes (with Anne Baraou) (1999)
- les Incidents de la nuit
  - Tome 1 (1999)
  - les Traces du dieu Enn (2000)
  - l'Embuscade (2002)

=== Guy Delisle ===
- Réflexion (October 1996, ISBN 978-2909020723)
- Aline et les autres (April 1999, ISBN 978-2844140159)
- Shenzhen (April 2000, ISBN 978-2844140357)
- Albert et les autres (June 2001, ISBN 978-2844140746)
- Pyongyang (June 2003, ISBN 978-2844141132)

=== Julie Doucet ===
- Ciboire de criss

=== Patrice Killoffer ===
- Killoffer en la matière (1992)
- Billet SVP (1995)
- La Clef des champs (1997)
- Six cent soixante-seize apparitions de Killoffer (2002)
- Le Rock et si je ne m'abuse le roll (2006)
- Quand faut y aller (2006)

=== Mattt Konture ===
- coll. Patte de Mouche
  - Supra plus (1992)
  - Glofluné Triblonto (1996)
  - Galopinot (story and drawings) (with Lewis Trondheim) (1998)
- coll. Mimolette
  - Printemps, Automnes (1993)
  - Krokrodile comix II (1999)
  - Tombe (la veste ?) (1999)
  - Head banger forever !? (2000)
  - Barjouflasque (2000)
  - Cinq heure du Mattt (2001)
  - Sclérose en plaques (2006)
- Ivan Morve (coll. Éperluette, 1996)
- Les Contures (coll. Ciboulette, 2004)
- Galopu sauve la terre (Hors-Collection, 2005)
- Archives - Mattt Konture (coll. Archives, 2006)

=== Étienne Lécroart ===
- Pervenche et Victor (1994)
- Cercle vicieux (2000)
- Le Cycle (2003)
- Scroubabble (2005)
- L'élite à la portée de tous (2005)

=== Jean-Christophe Menu ===
- Moins d'un quart de seconde pour vivre (with Lewis Trondheim) (1991)
- Dinozor Apokalips (1991)
- Omelette (1995)
- Livret de Phamille (1995)
- Gnognottes (1999)
- Le Livre du Mont-Vérité (2002)
- Mini Mune Comix (2003)
- Meder (2005; originally published by Futuropolis in 1988)
- Plates-Bandes (2005; writings)
- La Marraine des Moines (2008)
- Lock Groove Comix
  - Lock Groove Comix N°1 (2008)
  - Lock Groove Comix N°2 (2009)
- Lourdes coquilles (2009)
- Corr&spondance (with Christian Rosset) (2009; writings)
- La Présidente with Blutch (2010; originally published by Autrement in 1995)
- La bande dessinée et son double (2011; writings)

=== Léo Quievreux ===
- Agents dormants (2008)
- Sphynx song (with J. M. Bertoyas, 2012)

=== Riad Sattouf ===
- La vie secrète des jeunes (2007)

=== Marjane Satrapi ===
- Persepolis
  - Persepolis, vol. 1 (2000), ISBN 2-84414-058-0.
  - Persepolis, vol. 2 (2001), ISBN 2-84414-079-3.
  - Persepolis, vol. 3 (2002), ISBN 2-84414-104-8.
  - Persepolis, vol. 4 (2003), ISBN 2-84414-137-4.
- Broderies (2003, ISBN 2-84414-095-5)
- Poulet aux prunes (2004), ISBN 2-84414-159-5.

=== Joann Sfar ===
- Le petit monde du Golem (1998, ISBN 2-909020-98-3)

=== Lewis Trondheim ===
- Genèses apocalyptiques
- Non, non, non
- Le pays des trois sourires

=== Jim Woodring ===
- Frank
  - Frank (1998, ISBN 2-84414-005-X)
  - Frank, Tome 1 (2001, ISBN 978-2-844-14005-0)
  - Frank, Tome 2 (2006, ISBN 978-2-844-14216-0)
  - Frank's Real Pa: Suivi de Frank et la corde de luth (2007, ISBN 978-2-844-14224-5)
  - Weathercraft (2010, ISBN 978-2-844-14390-7)
  - Frank et le congrès des bêtes (2011, ISBN 978-2-844-14422-5)
  - Fran (2014, ISBN 978-2-844-14506-2)
