= Colonel Moutarde =

French comics artist

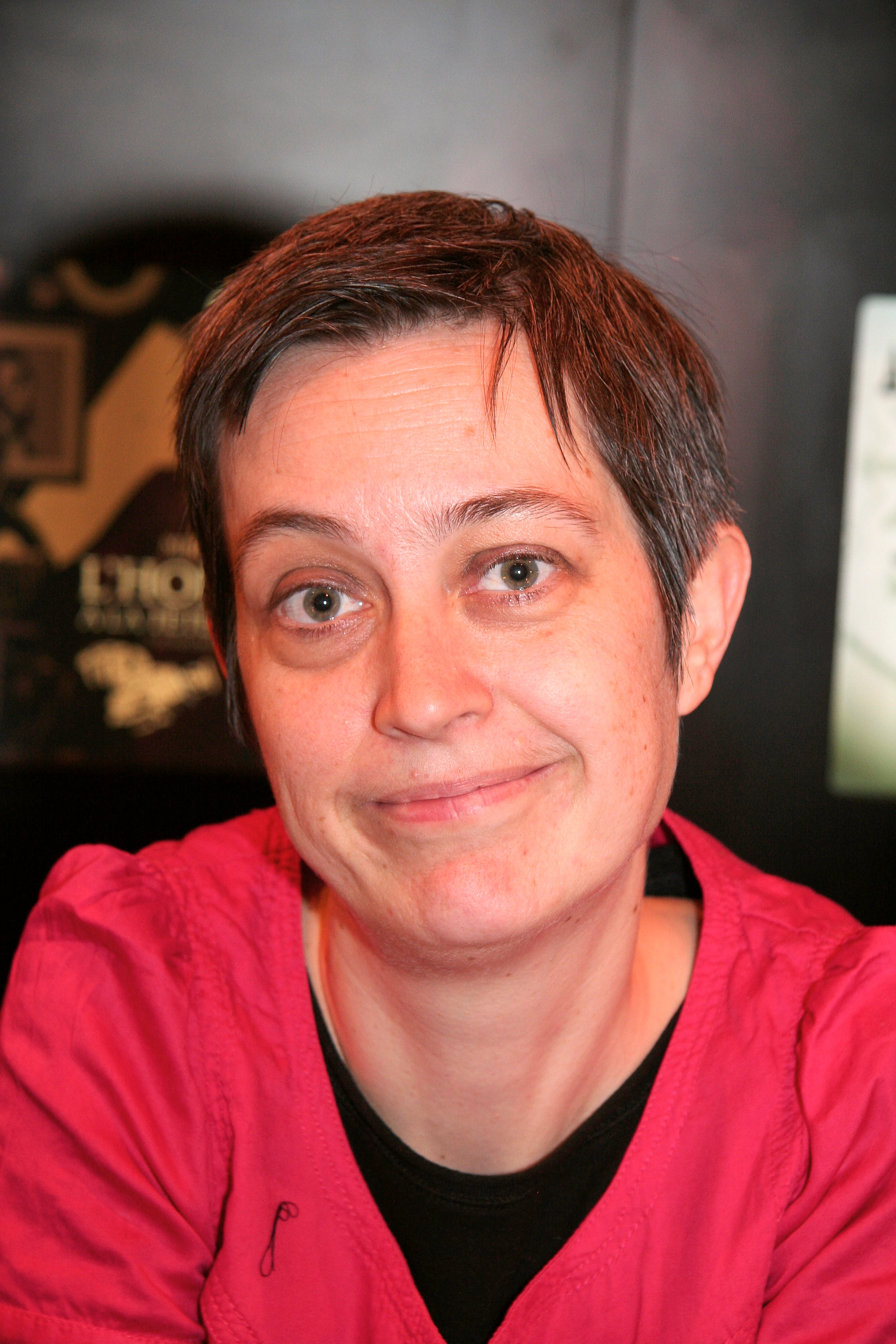
Colonel Moutarde at a book fair in Paris, France, in March 2008.

Colonel Moutarde (born 1968 in Saint-Nazaire) is a visual artist, popularly known for her comic books and work in the advertising industry.
