= Nihei =

Nihei (written: 二瓶 or 弐瓶) is a Japanese surname. Notable people with the surname include:

- Masanari Nihei (二瓶 正也, born 1940), Japanese actor
- Tsubasa Nihei (二瓶 翼, born 1994), Japanese footballer
- Tsutomu Nihei (弐瓶 勉, born 1971), Japanese manga artist
