= Blutch =

French comics artist and screenwriter

Christian Hincker
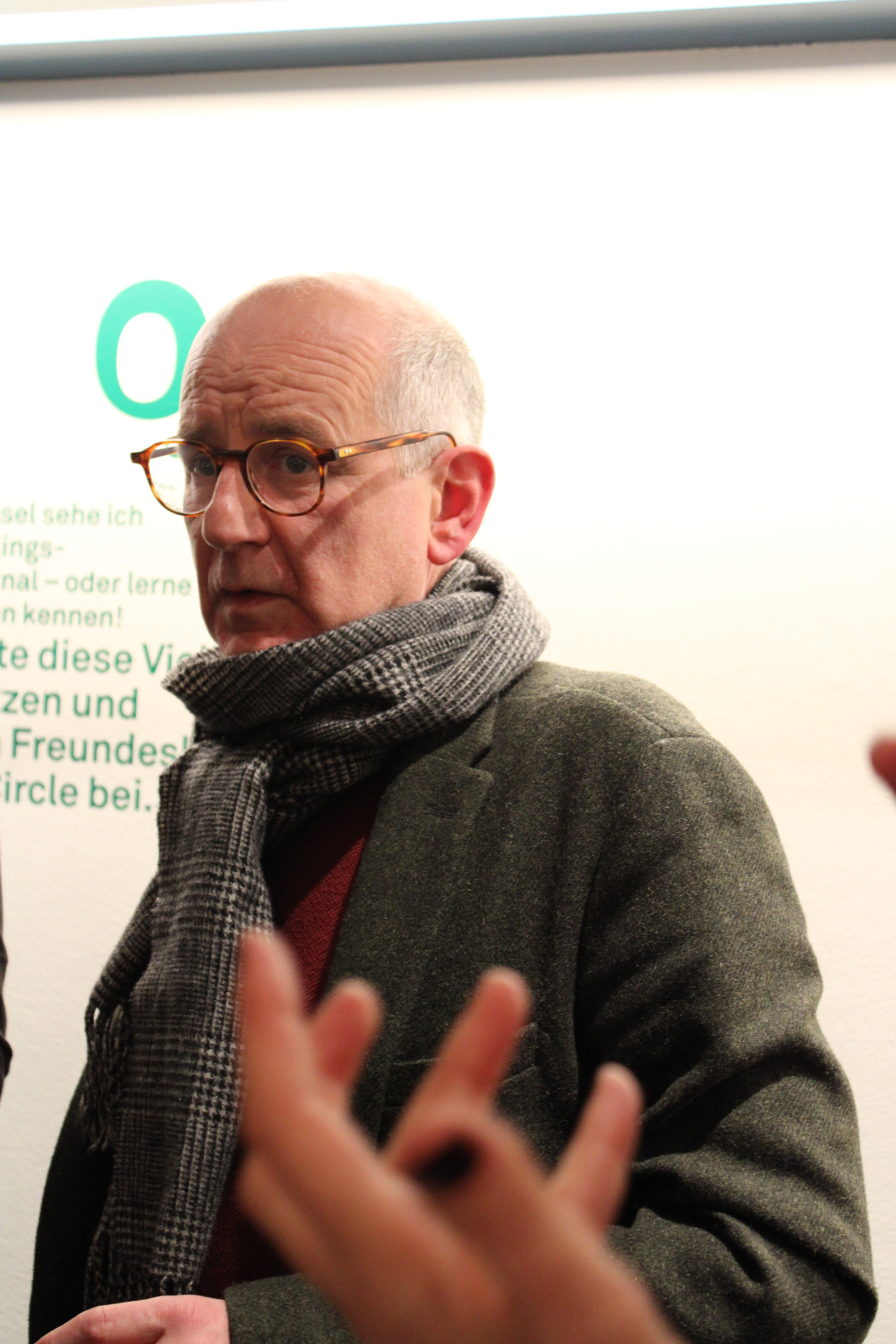
- Born: 27 December 1967 (age 58) Strasbourg
- Pseudonym: Blutch
- Notable works: Vitesse Moderne
- Awards: grand prix de la ville d'Angoulême

Signature
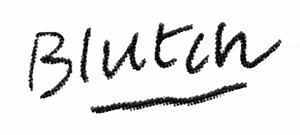

Blutch, pen name of Christian Hincker (born 27 December 1967 in Strasbourg) is a French comic book author. He is considered one of the main authors of French comics since the early 1990s.

== Biography ==
After studying at the École supérieure des arts décoratifs de Strasbourg, Blutch was discovered through a competition organized by the monthly magazine Fluide Glacial. He got his nickname from a classmate for his physical resemblance to Corporal Blutch, one of the characters of the comic series Les Tuniques Bleues.

His first strips appeared in Fluide Glacial between 1988 and 1993 (Pecos Jim, Waldo's Bar, Mademoiselle Sunnymoon). From 1993 he was part of the circle of cartoonists working for the independent comic book publisher L’Association. In 1996 he joined A Suivre magazine, where he designed the historical Péplum series. Rancho Bravo (with Jean-Louis Capron) and Blotch (two issues), a satirical portrait of Fluide Glacial magazine and its illustrators, appeared in the late 1990s. He underlined his versatility with the two-volume autobiography about his childhood in Le petit Christian (1998/2008) or with the comic novels Vitesse Moderne (2002) and La Volupté (2006).

In 2002, Blutch received the Prix international de la Ville de Genève pour la bande dessinée for Vitesse Moderne, and in 2009 the Grand Prix de la Ville d’Angoulême: that made Blutch president of the Angoulême comic festival in 2010.

== Awards ==
- 2000: Alph-Art humour at the festival d'Angoulême for Blotch.
- 2000: Prix Jacques-Lob.
- 2002: Prix Töpffer international for Vitesse Moderne.
- 2009: grand prix de la ville d'Angoulême.
- 2009: « Essentiel » d'Angoulême forn Le Petit Christian tome 2.
- 2017: prix Wolinksi de la BD du Point for Variations.
- 2019: Keys to the City of Strasbourg.

== Selected publications ==
- 1996–1999: Mitchum
- 1997: Peplum (first serialized in A Suivre magazine)
- 2000: Blotch (first serialized in Fluide Glacial)
- 2002: Vitesse Moderne (Modern Speed)
- 2004: Total Jazz
- 2006: La Volupté
- 2011: Pour en finir avec le cinema (So long, Silver Screen)
- 2014: Lune l'envers (Dark Side of the Moon)
