= David Beauchard =

French comic book artist and writer

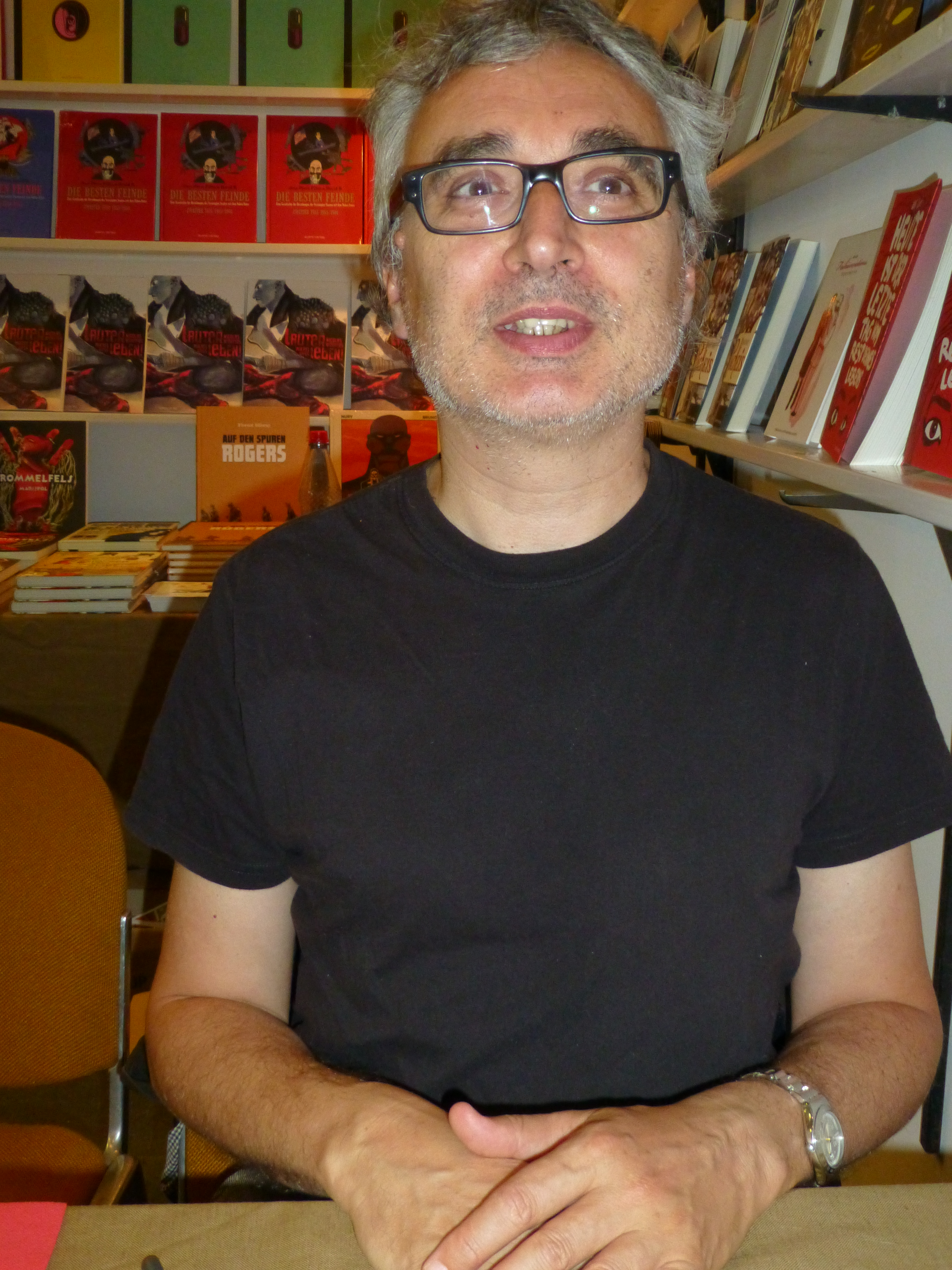
- David B. at the Comic Salon Erlangen 2014
- Born: Pierre-François Beauchard; 9 February 1959 (age 67) Nîmes, France
- Areas: artist, writer
- Notable works: l'Ascension du Haut Mal
- Awards: Angoulême International Comics Festival Prize for Scenario (2000); Ignatz Award for Outstanding Artist (2005); Max und Moritz Award (2008); Urhunden Prize (2016)

Pierre-François "David" Beauchard (French pronunciation: [david boʃaʁ]; born 9 February 1959), also known by the pen name David B., is a French comic book artist and writer, and one of the founders of L'Association.

== Biography ==
After studying advertising at the Duperré School of Applied Arts in Paris, Beauchard began working in comics in 1985 (Pas de samba pour capitaine Tonnerre), and wrote and illustrated stories in numerous magazines, including Okapi, À suivre, Tintin Reporter, and Chic. His distinctive black-and-white style was influenced by Georges Pichard and Jacques Tardi, among others.

In 1990, he co-founded the independent publisher L'Association, which became a major force in French small-press comics. His comics appeared in the L'Association anthology magazine Lapin and in numerous small-format books. Much of his work in the 1990s was dream art, collected in le Cheval blême and les Incidents de la nuit.

From 1996 to 2003, he created the acclaimed six-volume autobiographical epic l'Ascension du Haut Mal (meaning, literally, "The Ascension of Great Suffering," but published in English as Epileptic, "haut mal" indicating what is commonly referred to in English as a grand mal seizure). The series is about the author's brother and his decades-long struggle against epilepsy. It was the first of his long works to be translated into English, and is now considered to be among the masterpieces of recent Franco-Belgian comics. The series has been repeatedly nominated for prizes at the Angoulême International Comics Festival: in 2000, the fourth volume received the Angoulême International Comics Festival Prize for Scenario, and in 1998 and in 2004, volumes 2 and 6 were nominated for the Prize for Best Comic Book.

Since 1997, he has also worked for publishers other than L'Association, and has collaborated with other authors such as Joann Sfar, Christophe Blain, and Emmanuel Guibert.

In 1998, he was named European Cartoonist of the year by The Comics Journal.

In 2005 Beauchard was awarded the Ignatz Award for Outstanding Artist for both Epileptic and Babel.

With historical assistance by Jean-Pierre Filiu, Beauchard published the 2012 graphic novel Best of Enemies: A History of US and Middle East Relations through SelfMadeHero. It was translated to English by Edward Gauvin.

== Awards ==
Awards for Beauchard's work
Year	Work	Award	Result	Ref.
1998	L'ascension du haut mal, Vol. 2	Angoulême International Comics Festival Prize for Best Album	Finalist	
2000	L'ascension du haut mal, Vol. 4	Angoulême International Comics Festival Prize for Scenario	Winner	
2001	Le capitaine écarlate	Angoulême International Comics Festival Prize for Best Album	Finalist	
2001	Le capitaine écarlate	Prix de la critique	Finalist	
2002	La lecture des ruines	Angoulême International Comics Festival Prize for Best Album	Finalist	
2003	Epileptic, Vol. 1	Eisner Award for Best Graphic Album — New	Finalist	
2003	Epileptic, Vol. 1	Eisner Award for Best U.S. Edition of International Material	Finalist	
2004	L'ascension du haut mal, Vol. 6	Angoulême International Comics Festival Prize for Best Album	Finalist	
2005	Babel	Ignatz Award for Outstanding Artist	Winner	
2005	Epileptic	Ignatz Award for Outstanding Artist	Winner	
2006	Epileptic	Eisner Award for Best Reality-Based Work	Finalist	
2008	Epileptic	Max und Moritz Award for Best German-language Comic/Comic-related Publication (Import)	Winner	
2011	The Littlest Pirate King	Eisner Award for Best U.S. Edition of International Material	Finalist	
2013	Incidents in the Night, Vol. 1	Los Angeles Times Book Prize for Graphic Novel/Comics	Finalist	
2014	Incidents in the Night, Vol. 1	Eisner Award for Best U.S. Edition of International Material	Finalist	
2016	Epileptisk	Urhunden Prize for Best Comic in Swedish Translation	Winner	

== Bibliography ==
- le Timbre maudit (Bayard Presse, 1986)
- les Leçons du nourrisson savant (Le Seuil, 1990)
  1. les Leçons du nourrisson savant (1990)
  2. le Nourrisson savant et ses parents (1990)
- le Cheval blême (L'Association, 1992)
- le Cercueil de course (L'Association, 1993)
- le Livre somnambule (Automne 67, 1994)
- le Messie discret in le Retour de Dieu (Autrement, 1994)
- le Nain jaune (Cornélius, 1993–1994)
  1. Tome 1 (1993)
  2. Tome 2 (1993)
  3. Tome 3 (1994)
  4. Tome 4 (1994)
  5. Tome 5 (1994)
- la Bombe familiale (L'Association, 1997) ISBN 2-909020-78-9
- le Tengû carré (Dargaud, 1997) ISBN 2-205-04252-1
- les 4 Savants (Cornélius, 1996–1998)
  1. le Démon à tête d'entrailles (1996)
  2. la Circonvolution de la peur (1997)
  3. le Paradis terrestre (1998)
- L'Association en Égypte (with Golo, Edmond Baudoin, Jean-Christophe Menu) (L'Association, 1998)
- Maman a des problèmes (with Anne Baraou) (L'Association, 1999)
- Hiram Lowatt et Placido (with Christophe Blain) (Dargaud, 2000)
  1. la Révolte de Hop-Frog (2000)
  2. les Ogres (2000)
- la Ville des mauvais rêves (with Joann Sfar) (Dargaud, 2000)
  1. Urani (2000) ISBN 2-205-04795-7
- le Capitaine écarlate (with Emmanuel Guibert) (Dupuis, 2000) ISBN 2-8001-2971-9
- la Lecture des ruines (Dupuis, 2001)
- les Incidents de la nuit (L'Association, 1999–2002)
  1. Tome 1 (1999)
  2. les Traces du dieu Enn (2000)
  3. l'Embuscade (2002)
- l'Ascension du Haut Mal (Epileptic) (L'Association, 1996–2003)
  1. Tome 1 (1996) ISBN 2-909020-73-8
  2. Tome 2 (1997) ISBN 2-909020-84-3
  3. Tome 3 (1998) ISBN 2-84414-004-1
  4. Tome 4 (1999) ISBN 2-84414-020-3
  5. Tome 5 (2000) ISBN 2-84414-047-5
  6. Tome 6 (2003) ISBN 2-909020-07-X
- les Chercheurs de trésors (Dargaud, 2003–2004)
  1. l'Ombre de Dieu (2003) ISBN 2-205-05363-9
  2. la Ville froide (2004) ISBN 2-205-05479-1
- Babel (Coconino Press, 2004)
  1. Tome 1 (2004)
  2. Tome 2 (2006)
- les Complots nocturnes (Futuropolis, 2005)
- Zèbre (Tartamudo, 2005)
- le Jardin armé et autres histoires (Futuropolis, 2006)
- 2 Rêves (Brüsel, 2007)
- Par les chemins noirs (Futuropolis, 2007)
- Journal d'Italie 1, Trieste-Bologne (2010)
- Best of Enemies: A History of US and Middle East Relations (SelfMadeHero, 2012)

== Awards ==
- 2000: Angoulême Festival, Prize for Scenario, for L'ascension du Haut Mal Tome 4
- 2005: Ignatz Award, Outstanding Artist, for Epileptic
