= Joann Sfar =

French comics artist, graphic novelist, and film director

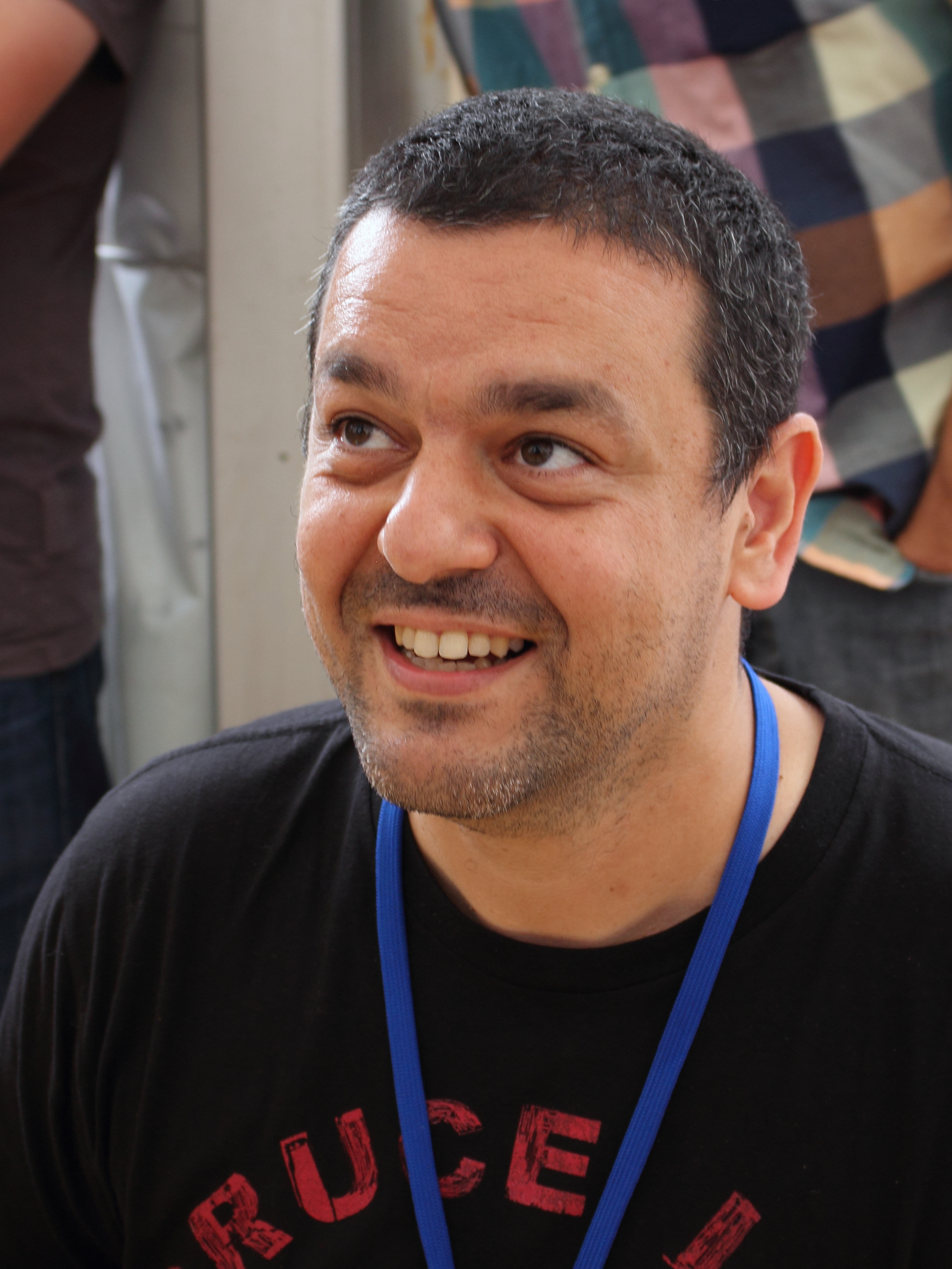
- Sfar in 2015
- Born: 28 August 1971 (age 55) Nice, France
- Areas: Writer, Artist
- Notable works: Les Potamoks; La Fille du professeur Donjon; Grand Vampire; Le chat du rabbin
- Awards: Full list
- Spouse: Sandrina Jardel (divorced)

Joann Sfar (French: [ʒoan sfaʁ]; born 28 August 1971) is a French comics artist, comic book creator, novelist, and film director.

== Life and career ==
Sfar was born in Nice, the son of Lilou, a pop singer, who died when he was three, and André Sfar, a lawyer well known for prosecuting Neo-Nazis. As a result of his mother's early death, Sfar was raised by his father and maternal grandfather, a military doctor of Ukrainian origin in the Alsace-Lorraine Independent Brigade (France) during World War II. Sfar's grandfather reportedly saved the right hand of the brigade's leader, novelist André Malraux, for which he was awarded French citizenship.

Sfar is considered one of the most important artists of the new wave of Franco-Belgian comics, though he has rejected the assertion that he, along with artists such as Christophe Blain, Marjane Satrapi, and Lewis Trondheim, sought to create an alternative scene or a new movement in comics. Many of his comics were published by L'Association which was founded in 1990 by Jean-Christophe Menu and six other artists. He also worked with many of the group's main artists, e.g. David B. and Lewis Trondheim. The Donjon series, which he created with Trondheim, has a cult following in many countries.

Some of his comics are inspired by his Jewish heritage. Sfar is the son of Jewish parents (an Ashkenazi mother whose family was from Ukraine and a Sephardic father from Algeria). He himself says that there is Ashkenazi humor in his Professeur Bell series (loosely based on Joseph Bell), whereas Le chat du rabbin is clearly inspired by his Sephardic side. Les olives noires is a series about a Jewish child living in Israel at the time of Jesus. Like Le chat du rabbin, the series contains a lot of historical and theological information.

His main influences are Fred and André Franquin, as well as Marc Chagall, Chaïm Soutine, Will Eisner, Hugo Pratt and John Buscema.

From 2009 to 2010, Sfar wrote and directed Gainsbourg: Vie Héroïque, a biopic of the illustrious French songwriter and singer, of whom Sfar is a self-confessed fanatic. The film, which draws substantially on Sfar's abilities as a comic book artist through its extensive use of fantasy artwork, animation and puppetry, was released in 2010 to general critical acclaim.

Sfar's book L’Eternel has been adapted for a live-action drama entitled Monsters’ Shrink by Canal plus.

== Published works ==
=== In English ===
- Klezmer: Tales of the Wild East, First Second Books, New York, 2006.
- Vampire Loves, First Second Books, New York, 2006.
- Sardine in Outer Space, 6 volumes, with Emmanuel Guibert, First Second Books, New York, 2006–2008.
- The Professor's Daughter, with Emmanuel Guibert, First Second Books, New York, 2007.
- The Rabbi's Cat, Pantheon, 2007.
- The Rabbi's Cat 2, Pantheon, 2008.
- Little Vampire, First Second Books, New York, 2008.
- Dungeon (since 1998, with Lewis Trondheim and collective)
- The Little Prince (Comic Adaptation), Houghton Mifflin Harcourt, New York, 2010.
- Pascin, Uncivilized Books, 2016.

=== In French ===
Cover of The Rabbi's Cat (2005)

- Petrus Barbygère (with Pierre Dubois, scenario)
  - L'elficologue (1996, Delcourt, ISBN 2-84055-082-2)
  - Le croquemitaine d'écume (1997, Delcourt, ISBN 2-84055-136-5)
- Les Potamoks (with José-Luis Munuera, art)
  - 1. Terra Incognita (1996, Delcourt, ISBN 2-84055-088-1)
  - 2. Les fontaines rouges (1996, Delcourt, ISBN 2-84055-110-1)
  - 3. Nous et le désert (1997, Delcourt, ISBN 2-84055-147-0)
- La Fille du professeur (1997, with Emmanuel Guibert (art), Dupuis, ISBN 2-8001-2481-4)
  - Published in English by First Second Books as The Professor's Daughter (2007), ISBN 1-59643-130-X
- Donjon (since 1998, with Lewis Trondheim and collective)
- Le petit monde du Golem (1998, L'Association, ISBN 2-909020-98-3)
- Troll (with Olivier Boiscommun, art)
  - 3. Mille et un ennuis (1999, Delcourt, ISBN 2-84055-276-0)
- Professeur Bell (from #3, with Hervé Tanquerelle, art)
  - 1. Le mexicain à deux têtes (1999, Delcourt, ISBN 2-84055-257-4)
  - 2. Les poupées de Jérusalem (2000, Delcourt, ISBN 2-84055-432-1)
  - 3. Le cargo du Roi Singe (2002, Delcourt, ISBN 2-84055-752-5)
  - 4. Promenade des Anglaises (2003, Delcourt, ISBN 2-84789-187-0)
  - 5. L'Irlande à bicyclette (2006, Delcourt, ISBN 2-7560-0013-2)
- Urani (2000, with David B, Dargaud, ISBN 2-205-04795-7)
- Grand Vampire
  - 1. Cupidon s'en fout (2001, Delcourt, ISBN 2-84055-526-3)
  - 2. Mortelles en tête (2002, Delcourt, ISBN 2-84055-809-2)
  - 3. Transatlantique en solitaire (2002, Delcourt, ISBN 2-84055-941-2)
  - 4. Quai des brunes (2003, Delcourt, ISBN 2-84789-000-9)
    - Books 1-4 published in English as Vampire Loves (2006, First Second, ISBN 1-59643-093-1)
  - 5. La Communauté des magiciens (2004, Delcourt, ISBN 2-84789-262-1)
  - 6. Le peuple est un Golem (2005, Delcourt, ISBN 2-84789-494-2)
- Les olives noires (with Emmanuel Guibert, art)
  - 1. Pourquoi cette nuit est-elle différente des autres nuits? (2001, Dupuis, ISBN 2-8001-3149-7)
  - 2. Adam Harishon (2002, Dupuis, ISBN 2-8001-3220-5)
  - 3. Tu ne mangeras pas le chevreau dans le lait de sa mère (2003, Dupuis, ISBN 2-8001-3378-3)
- Le chat du rabbin
  - 1. La Bar-Mitsva (2002, Dargaud, ISBN 2-205-05207-1)
  - 2. Le Malka des Lions (2002, Dargaud, ISBN 2-205-05369-8)
  - 3. L'exode (2003, Dargaud, ISBN 2-205-05497-X)
    - Books 1-3 published in English as The Rabbi's Cat (2005, Pantheon, ISBN 0-375-42281-1)
  - 4. Le Paradis Terrestre (2005, Dargaud, ISBN 2-205-05725-1)
  - 5. Jérusalem d'Afrique (2006, Dargaud, ISBN 2-205-05868-1)
    - Books 4-5 published in English as The Rabbi's Cat 2 (2008, Pantheon, ISBN 0-375-42507-1)
  - 6. Tu n'auras pas d'autre dieu que moi (2015, Dargaud, ISBN 2-205-07353-2)
  - 7. La Tour de Bab-El-Oued (2017, Dargaud)
  - 8. Petits paniers aux amandes (2018, Dargaud)
  - 9. La Reine de Shabbat (2019, Dargaud)
  - 10. Rentrez chez vous ! (2020, Dargaud)
  - 11. La Bible pour les chats (2021, Dargaud)
  - 12. La Traversée de la mer Noire (2023, Dargaud)
  - 13. L'Arbre de la connaissance (2025, Dargaud)
- Klezmer
  - 1. Conquête de l'Est (2005, Gallimard, ISBN 2-07-057309-5)
  - 2. Bon anniversaire Scylla (2006, Gallimard, ISBN 2-07-057552-7)
  - 3. Tous des voleurs! (2007, Gallimard, ISBN 2-07-057868-2)
  - 4. Trapèze volant! (2012, Gallimard ISBN 978-2-07-064315-8)
  - 5. Kishinev-des-fous (2014, Gallimard ISBN 978-2-07-064922-8)
- Chagall en Russie
  - 1. Première partie (2010, Gallimard ISBN 978-2-07-062825-4)
  - 2. Seconde partie (2011, Gallimard ISBN 978-2-07-063853-6)
- "Nous Vivrons" (2024)

== Filmography ==
Year	Title	Credited as			Notes
Year	Title	Director	Screenwriter	Producer	Notes
2010	Gainsbourg: A Heroic Life	Yes	Yes		Also as actor (as Georges Brassens); César Award for Best First Feature Film; Nominated—César Award for Best Film; Nominated—Lumière Award for Best Film; Nominated—Lumière Award for Best Director
2011	The Rabbi's Cat	Yes	Yes	Yes	Based on his comic series; also as storyboard artist and voice actor César Award for Best Animated Film; Cristal Award for Best Feature Film; Prix Jacques Prévert du Scénario for Best Adaptation; Nominated—Annie Award for Best Animated Feature; Nominated—European Film Award for Best Animated Feature Film
2013	Aya of Yop City			Yes	Nominated—César Award for Best Animated Film
2014	Kahlil Gibran's The Prophet	Yes			
2015	The Lady in the Car with Glasses and a Gun	Yes			
2020	Little Vampire	Yes	Yes		Based on his comic series Nominated—César Award for Best Animated Film

== Novels ==
- L'éternel (2013, Albin Michel, ISBN 2-22-624685-1)
- Le Plus Grand Philosophe de France (2014, Albin Michel, ISBN 2-22-625824-8)

== Awards ==
- 1998: Award for First Comic Book and René Goscinny Award at the Angoulême International Comics Festival, France
- 2000: Nominated for Best Comic Book and for the Youth Award (9 to 12 years) at the Angoulême International Comics Festival
  - Nominated for the Best Long Comic Strip at the Haxtur Awards Spain
  - Nominated for Best International Writer at the Max & Moritz Prizes, Germany
- 2001: Nominated for Best Scenario and for the Humour Award at the Angoulême International Comics Festival
- 2002: Nominated for Best Artwork and the Canal BD Award at the Angoulême International Comics Festival
- 2003: Oecumenic Jury Award and Polish award at the Angoulême International Comics Festival
  - Nominated for Best Comic Book, for the Canal BD Award, and for the Prix de la critique at the Angoulême International Comics Festival
- 2004: Grand Prix de la ville d'Angoulême: 30th anniversary prize, France
  - Award for Best Youth Album (7 to 8 years) at the Angoulême International Comics Festival
  - Best International Series at the Prix Saint-Michel, Belgium
  - Nominated for Best Series at the Angoulême International Comics Festival
  - Best International Writer at the Max & Moritz Prizes, Germany
- 2005: Nominated for Best Artwork at the Angoulême International Comics Festival
- 2006: Best U.S. Edition of Foreign Material at the Eisner Awards, United States
  - Nominated for the Audience Award and for Best Series at the Angoulême International Comics Festival
- 2007: Sproing Award, for Best Foreign translated material, Rabbinerens katt (Le chat du rabbin), Norway
  - Nominated for Outstanding Series at the Ignatz Awards, United States
