= Étienne Lécroart =

French cartoonist (born 1960)

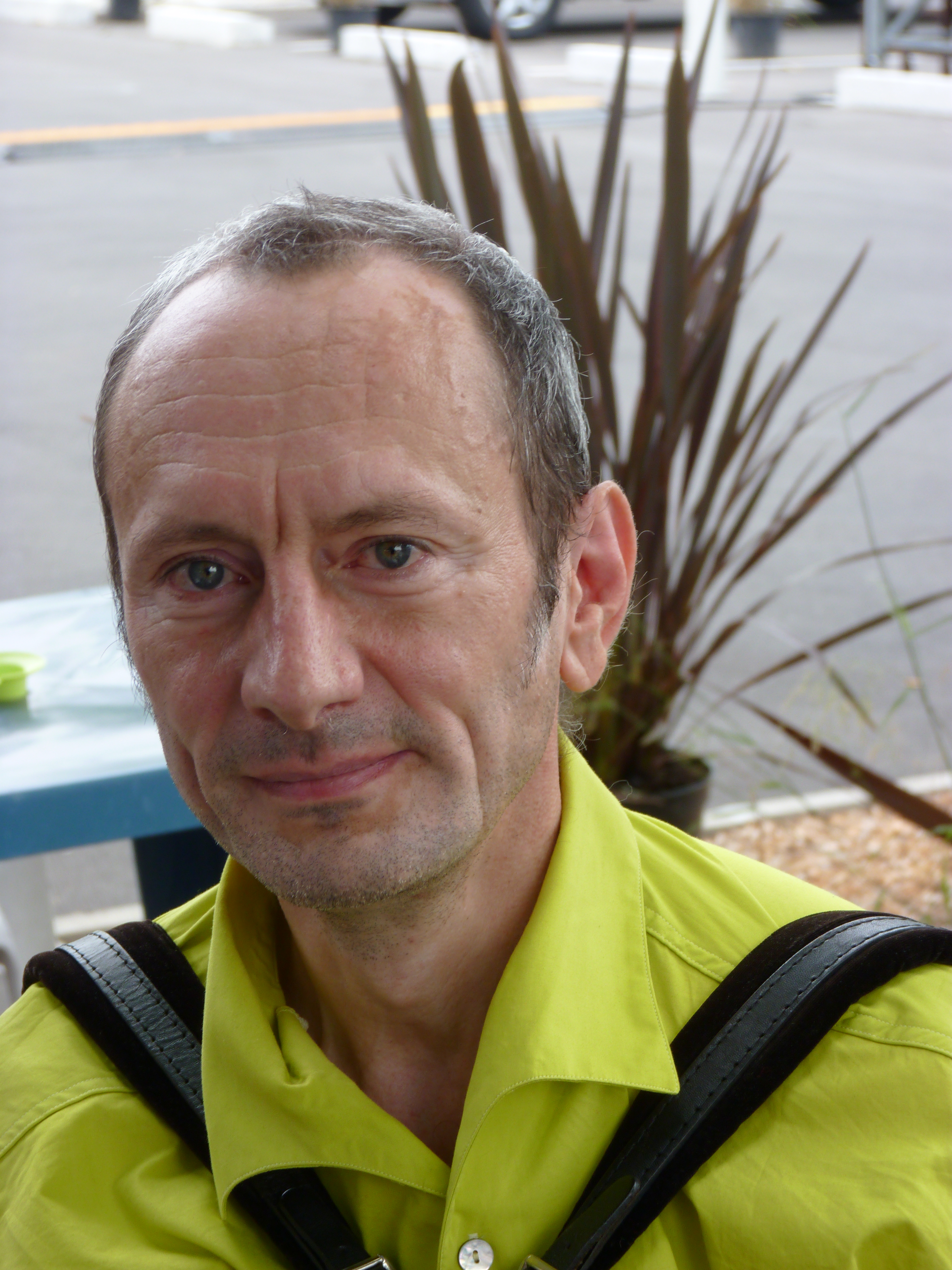
- Born: 2 November 1960 (age 66) Rueil-Malmaison, France
- Areas: Cartoonist, Writer, Artist
- Notable works: Cercle vicieux

Étienne Lécroart (born 1960) is a French cartoonist. He is a founder and key member of Oubapo association, Ouvroir de BAnde dessinée POtentielle. He has composed cartoons that could be read either horizontally, vertically, or diagonally, and vice versa. He also plays the sousaphone, and participates in several musical bands.

== Awards ==
- 1999 : Lauréat du Trophée Presse-Citron, best French press editorial cartoon
- 2003 : Grand Prix de l'Humour Noir Grandville 2003

== Bibliography ==
- L'Ère du cornichon (Car rien n'a d'importance - 1992)
- Pervenche et Victor (L'Association - 1994)
- Pat et Tic (Hors Gabarit - 1995)
- La vie exemplaire de Saint Sinus (Cornélius - 1995)
- Poil au Cupidon (Glénat - 1995)
- Oupus 1 (L'Association - 1996)
- La Vie de bureau (Hors Collection - 1996)
- Et c'est comme ça que je me suis enrhumée (Le Seuil - 1998)
- Ratatouille (Le Seuil - 1999)
- Cercle vicieux (L'Association - 2000) — the first half of the cartoon is used for the second half, but in the reverse order.
- Oupus 3 (L'Association - 2000)
- Tout l'humour du monde (Glénat - 2001)
- Machins trucs (Glénat - 2002)
- Superlipopette (Glénat - 2003)
- Le Cycle (L'Association - 2003)
- Oupus 2 (L'Association - 2003)
- Oupus 4 (L'Association - 2004)
- Scroubabble (Jeu - L'Association - 2005)
- L'élite à la portée de tous (L'Association - 2005)

== Music ==
- Copains Comme Cochons
