= Lewis Trondheim =

French cartoonist

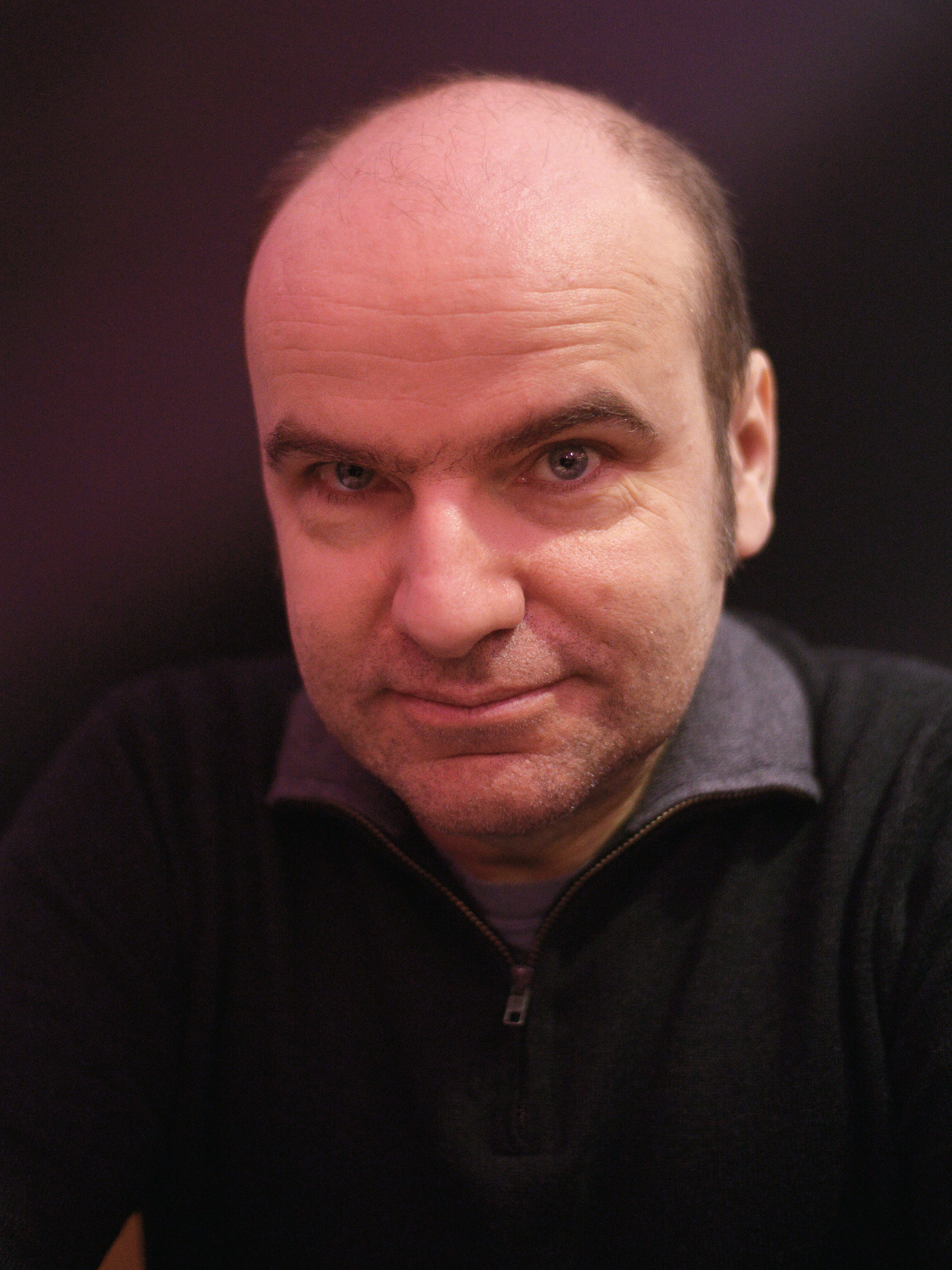
- Trondheim in 2015
- Born: Laurent Chabosy; December 11, 1964 (age 61) Fontainebleau, France
- Areas: Writer, Artist
- Pseudonym: Frantico
- Notable works: Les formidables aventures de Lapinot; Donjon
- Awards: full list

Laurent Chabosy (French: [ʃabɔzi]; born 11 December 1964), better known as Lewis Trondheim (French pronunciation: [lewis tʁɔ̃dɛm]), is a French cartoonist and one of the founders (in 1990) of the independent publisher L'Association. Both his silent comic La Mouche and Kaput & Zösky have been made into animated cartoons.

A figure in Franco-Belgian comics whose career began in the early 1990s, Trondheim is mostly known as the author of Les formidables aventures de Lapinot (translated to English as The Spiffy Adventures of McConey) and the co-creator of comic fantasy series Dungeon with Joann Sfar, as well as his autobiographical series Les petits riens (translated to English as Little Nothings).

As an artist, Trondheim is known for his "potato-shaped" characters and anthropomorphic animals, in a minimalistic style reminiscent of ligne claire. His works often feature witty dialogue and characters in surreal or darkly humorous situations, where comedy may intertwine with tragedy. Working with several genres such as fantasy, the supernatural, experimental, autobiographical, or children's stories, Trondheim has contributed to more than 150 books, both as an artist and a writer.

== Biography ==
=== Debut and rise to fame ===
Lewis Trondheim was first known as the author of Les formidables aventures de Lapinot. He invented the character in the late 1980s as a way to learn cartooning. The result was an initial 500 page graphic novel, Lapinot et les carottes de Patagonie. All the while, he was publishing short stories for the satirical French magazine Psikopat.

After his book Slaloms was awarded what was then called the Alph'Art Coup de coeur (First comic book prize) in 1993, Trondheim was offered to bring his burgeoning series to a major publisher, Dargaud, while he continued churning out more personal books for L'Association and other independent French publishers such as Cornélius. From there onwards, Trondheim began to enjoy a steady rise in popularity.

The following years represented a period of increasing activity, as Trondheim began to work on many different projects. He first created La Mouche ("The Fly") for Japanese publisher Kodansha, which was featured in Monthly Afternoon magazine in the early 1990s; after falling out with the publisher over creative differences, he redrew a French version from scratch in 1995, after which the character was adapted as an animated cartoon in 1999.

Trondheim's saw further success following Lapinot in Dungeon (in French, Donjon), a series created alongside Joann Sfar.

=== "Retirement" and online projects ===
In 2004, after a long and intensive period during which he steadily released new books at a frantic pace, Lewis Trondheim announced he was more or less retiring from the world of comic strips, stating he did not want his passion to become a "job". He did draw and write a few stories within the following year, including a book reflecting on his decision to slow down, though the releases occurred at a much slower pace.

At that time, in 2005, Trondheim began Le blog de Frantico, which was a blog BD (French webcomic in blog format) published daily on the web for a whole year under the pseudonym Frantico. The webcomic was presented as an autobiographical work, chronicling the daily life of a single 30-year-old graphic designer and aspiring cartoonist, living in Paris. In interviews and on his web sites, Trondheim alternately admitted and denied having written Le blog de Frantico, while graphic designer Sébastien Lesage stepped up and claimed to be the real author, saying he had asked Trondheim to help him maintain the mystery. Trondheim went on and authored other webcomics under the alias Frantico, such as Nico Shark and Mega Krav Maga. The true identity of Frantico remained a subject of speculation until a retrospective exhibition in 2020 confirmed Trondheim as the author of Le blog de Frantico.

Another recent Trondheim occupation is that of editorial director at Delcourt, where he manages Shampooing, a collection of comic books for young readers.

In 2006, Trondheim was awarded the Grand Prix de la ville d'Angoulême at the Angoulême International Comics Festival, one of the most prestigious awards in the field. That same year, Trondheim began the autobiographical webcomic Les Petits Riens (Little Nothings), published on his personal website, in line with his earlier works Approximativement and Carnets de bord. Les Petits Riens was eventually published as books by Delcourt, in Trondheim's own collection Shampooing; as of 2024, the series counts nine volumes.

=== Recent works ===
Beginning in the late 2000s, Trondheim worked as a writer for several graphic novels and comics, such as Célébritiz with artist Ville Ranta, Omni-visibilis and Wichitas with artist Matthieu Bonhomme. He also stepped down from his role as artist on the series Donjon Zénith, to work as a writer along with Joann Sfar, while Boulet took over as artist.

In 2011, Trondheim began a new fantasy series Ralph Azham, which as of 2024, counts ten volumes.

In 2016, he began the science fiction comics series Infinity 8, initially published in a format inspired by American comic books, with Trondheim working as a writer in collaboration with other writers and artists.

In 2024, Trondheim was listed in the credits for the board game Unlock!: Risky Adventures, part of the Unlock! series of games.

== Personal life ==
Trondheim explained his choice of pseudonym after the Norwegian city of Trondheim as follows: "As a last name I wanted to use a city's name, but Lewis Bordeaux or Lewis Toulouse didn't sound so good. Then I thought about this city, Trondheim… Maybe someday I will publish a book under my real name, in order to remain anonymous."

In 1993, he married Brigitte Findakly, a comics colorist and writer.

== Awards ==
- 1994: Award for First Comic Book at the Angoulême International Comics Festival, France
- 1999: 2 nominations for the Harvey Award for Best American Edition of Foreign Material
- 2000: Best German-language Comic—Import at the Max & Moritz Prizes, Germany

- Inkpot Award, United States
- nomination for the Harvey Award for Best American Edition of Foreign Material
- nominated for Best Long Comic Strip at the Haxtur Awards, Spain

- 2001: nomination for the Harvey Award for Best American Edition of Foreign Material

- nomination for the Humour Award at the Angoulême International Comics Festival
- nomination for Outstanding Story at the Ignatz Awards, USA

- 2002: nomination for the Harvey Award for Best Presentation of Foreign Material

- nomination for the Dialogue Award at the Angoulême International Comics Festival

- 2004: Best International Series at the Prix Saint-Michel, Belgium

- nomination for the Series Award at the Angoulême International Comics Festival

- 2005: Series Award at the Angoulême International Comics Festival

- nomination for the Prize for Artwork at the Angoulême International Comics Festival

- 2006: Grand Prix de la ville d'Angoulême, France
- 2007: nominated for the Ignatz Awards for Outstanding Series
- 2008: nominated for the Eisner Awards for Best Short Story and Best Lettering
- 2010: nominated for the Eisner Awards for Best Publication for Kids and Best U.S. Edition of International Material

- nominated for the Award for Best Youth Comic at the Prix Saint-Michel

- 2016: Rudolph-Dirks-Award for Best Scenario for Ralph Azham and Herr Hase

== Bibliography ==
Trondheim has written or drawn more than a hundred titles, spanning a large spectrum of genres; some of the most notable are:

- The Spiffy Adventures of McConey (Les formidables aventures de Lapinot; 10 official volumes), which mix satire and fantasy. The main characters are all animals: for instance McConey is a shy and easygoing rabbit, while Richard is an engaging cat with a loud mouth and a knack for getting into trouble. The stories alternate between modern France and stock historical settings. The recurring characters in the series can be thought of as actors who don't always play the same people, but always play the same type of roles.
- Dungeon (Donjon; more than 30 volumes), co-written with Joann Sfar, an extremely ambitious series which attempts to chronicle a Dungeons & Dragons-like dungeon through three separate epochs. The tone varies from heroic to comic to rather dark.
- Several children comics, among them: Le roi catastrophe (8 volumes), drawn by Fabrice Parme, a series about a boy king; Monstrueux (3 volumes), featuring a young French family resembling Trondheim's, and their pet monster Jean-Christophe; Kaput and Zösky (2 volumes), featuring space aliens, which in recent years, has been converted into a television program; and more recently A.L.I.E.E.E.N., an "alien children book" Trondheim jokingly claims to have found in a country field while on vacation.
- Collections of short, modern comic strip fables, sometimes starring simplified, potato-shaped characters, the bulk of which has been published by L'Association (Genèses apocalyptiques, Non, non, non, Le pays des trois sourires, etc.)
- Autobiographical comics, such as those collected in Approximate Continuum Comics, which later formed his book Approximativement; as well as his more recent Carnet de bord series (3 volumes). Newer autobiographical comics are regularly published on his blog under the title Les petits riens (serialized in English paperback volumes as Little Nothings).
- Various conceptual comics, such as Le dormeur and Psychanalyse, both of which were created entirely with a single photocopied panel, while Bleu and La nouvelle pornographie are both billed as "abstract comic books". After Psychanalyse, Trondheim was challenged by J.C. Menu to write a story with only 4 different panels, drawn by Menu. After some strips, Trondheim asked for four more panels, and wrote the highly dense comic book, Moins d'un quart de seconde pour vivre. Such constrained writing achievements, reminiscent of OuLiPo writers, were a huge incentive for OuBaPo's creation.

=== English translations ===
Two volumes of McConey have been published in English by Fantagraphics in editions close to the original. In 2018, Dargaud also began releasing English translations with the title The Marvelous Adventures of McConey under the Europe Comics label. As of April 2018, three volumes have been published.

Fantagraphics has additionally published a range of shorter pieces by Trondheim in the comic The Nimrod. NBM has published Dungeon, both in comic book and graphic novel formats, as well as Little Nothings, a collection of autobiographical one-page vignettes. English versions of A.L.I.E.E.N. (retitled A.L.I.E.E.E.N.) and Le Roi Catastrophe (retitled Tiny Tyrant) have been published by First Second.

The complete Ralph Azham series has been published in four volumes by Super Genius, an imprint of Papercutz.
