= Eisner Award for Best Graphic Album — New =

American comic book award

- Country: United States
- First award: 1991
- Most recent winner: Drome
- Website: www.comic-con.org/awards/eisner-awards/

The Eisner Award for Best Graphic Album — New, established in 1991 as part of the Eisner Awards, is an American comics award presented annually for "creative achievement" in American comics.

== Winners and nominees ==
Year	Title	Creators	Publisher	Result	Ref.
1990s
1991	Elektra Lives Again	Frank Miller and Lynn Varley	Marvel	Winner	
1992	To the Heart of the Storm	Will Eisner	Kitchen Sink	Winner	
1992	Abraham Stone	Joe Kubert	Platinum/Malibu	Finalist	
1992	Batman: Judgement on Gotham	Alan Grant, John Wagner, and Simon Bisley	DC	Finalist	
1992	The Yattering and Jack	Clive Barker, Steve Niles, and John Bolton	Eclipse	Finalist	
1993	Signal to Noise	Neil Gaiman and Dave McKean	VG Graphics/Dark Horse	Winner	
1993	Bloodlines: A Tale from the Heart of Africa	Cindy Goff, Rafael Nieves, and Seitu Hayden	Epic	Finalist	
1993	Fairy Tales of Oscar Wilde, vol. 1	P. Craig Russell	NBM	Finalist	
1993	The Mythology of an Abandoned City	Jon J Muth	Tundra	Finalist	
1993	Sinking	James Hudnall and Robert P. Ortaleza	Epic	Finalist	
1993	Skin	Peter Milligan and Brendan McCarthy	Tundra	Finalist	
1994	A Small Killing	Alan Moore and Oscar Zárate	VG Graphics/Dark Horse	Winner	
1994	Billie Holiday	Jose Munoz and Carlos Sampaya	Fantagraphics	Finalist	
1994	The Upturned Stone	Scott Hampton	Kitchen Sink	Finalist	
1995	Fairy Tales of Oscar Wilde Vol. 2	P. Craig Russell	NBM	Winner	
1995	Ballad of Doctor Richardson	Paul Pope	Horse Press	Finalist	
1995	Introducing Kafka	D. Z. Mairowitz and R. Crumb	Kitchen Sink	Finalist	
1995	Jar of Fools Part 1	Jason Lutes	Penny Dreadful	Finalist	
1995	Our Cancer Year	Harvey Pekar, Joyce Brabner, and Frank Stack	Four Walls Eight Windows	Finalist	
1995	Paul Auster's City of Glass	Paul Karasik and David Mazzucchelli	Avon/NeonLit	Finalist	
1996	Stuck Rubber Baby	Howard Cruse	Paradox Press	Winner	
1996	Adolf	Osamu Tezuka	Cadence Books	Finalist	
1996	Dropsie Avenue: The Neighborhood	Will Eisner	Kitchen Sink	Finalist	
1996	Fairy Tales of the Brothers Grimm	Doug Wheeler and David Wenzel	NBM	Finalist	
1996	Jar of Fools Part 2	Jason Lutes	Black Eye Productions	Finalist	
1997	Fax from Sarajevo	Joe Kubert	Dark Horse Books	Winner	
1997	Adolf (Vol. 2-5)	Osamu Tezuka	Cadence Books	Finalist	
1997	Batman and Captain America	John Byrne	DC/Marvel	Finalist	
1997	Castle Waiting: The Curse of Brambly Hedge	Linda Medley	OLIO	Finalist	
1997	Marilyn: The Story of a Woman	Kathryn Hyatt	Seven Stories Press	Finalist	
1998	Batman & Superman Adventures: World's Finest	Paul Dini, Joe Staton, and Terry Beatty	DC	Winner	
1998	The Borden Tragedy	Rick Geary	NBM	Finalist	
1998	A History of Violence	John Wagner and Vince Locke	Paradox Press	Finalist	
1998	A Jew in Communist Prague, Vol. 1-2	Vittorio Giardino	NBM	Finalist	
1998	Scary Godmother	Jill Thompson	Sirius	Finalist	
1998	The Wizards Tale	Kurt Busiek and Dave Wenzel	Jukebox Productions/ Homage	Finalist	
1999	Superman: Peace on Earth	Paul Dini and Alex Ross	DC	Winner	
1999	The Amazing "True" Story of a Teenage Single Mom	Katherine Arnoldi	Hyperion	Finalist	
1999	Family Matter	Will Eisner	Kitchen Sink	Finalist	
1999	My War with Brian	Ted Rall	NBM	Finalist	
1999	You Are Here	Kyle Baker	DC/Vertigo	Finalist	
2000s
2000	Acme Novelty Library #13	Chris Ware	Fantagraphics	Winner	
2000	After the Rain	André Juillard	NBM	Finalist	
2000	Ethel & Ernest	Raymond Briggs	Knopf	Finalist	
2000	Good-bye, Chunky Rice	Craig Thompson	Top Shelf	Finalist	
2000	The Jew of New York	Ben Katchor	Pantheon	Finalist	
2000	Lost Girl	Nabiel Kanan	NBM	Finalist	
2001	Safe Area Gorazde	Joe Sacco		Winner	
2001	From Cloud 99--Memories Part 1	Yslaire	Humanoids	Finalist	
2001	Last Lonely Saturday	Jordan Crane	Red Ink	Finalist	
2001	Louis: Red Letter Day	Metaphrog	Metaphrog	Finalist	
2001	Pedro and Me	Judd Winick	Henry Holt	Finalist	
2002	The Name of the Game	Will Eisner	DC	Winner	
2002	The Book of Leviathan	Peter Blegvad	Overlook Press	Finalist	
2002	Fallout	Jim Ottaviani, Janine Johnston, Steve Lieber, Vince Locke, Bernie Mireault, and Jeff Parke	GT Labs	Finalist	
2002	The Golem's Mighty Swing	James Sturm	Drawn & Quarterly	Finalist	
2002	Hey, Wait...	Jason	Fantagraphics	Finalist	
2002	Mail Order Bride	Mark Kalesniko	Fantagraphics	Finalist	
2002	Pictures That [Tick]	Dave McKean	Hourglass/Allen Spiegel Fine Arts	Finalist	
2003	One! Hundred! Demons!	Lynda Barry	Sasquatch Books	Winner	
2003	Epileptic, vol. 1	David B.	L'Association	Finalist	
2003	Garlands of Moonlight	Jai Sen and Rizky Wasisto Edi	Shoto Press	Finalist	
2003	Pulpatoon Pilgrimage	Joel Priddy	AdHouse Books	Finalist	
2003	The Yellow Jar	Patrick Atangan	NBM	Finalist	
2004	Blankets	Craig Thompson	Top Shelf	Winner	
2004	Blacksad	Juan Diaz Canales and Juanjo Guarnido	iBooks	Finalist	
2004	The Fixer: A Story from Sarajevo	Joe Sacco	Drawn & Quarterly	Finalist	
2004	Persepolis	Marjane Satrapi	Pantheon	Finalist	
2004	Yossel, April 19, 1943	Joe Kubert	iBooks	Finalist	
2005	The Originals	Dave Gibbons	Vertigo/DC	Winner	
2005	Blacksad Book 2: Arctic Nation	Juan Diaz Canales and Juanjo Guarnido	iBooks	Finalist	
2005	It's a Bird...	Steven T. Seagle and Teddy Kristiansen	Vertigo/DC	Finalist	
2005	Suspended in Language	Jim Ottaviani and Leland Purvis	GT Labs	Finalist	
2005	Tommysaurus Rex	Doug TenNapel	Image	Finalist	
2006	Top Ten: The Forty-Niners	Alan Moore and Gene Ha	ABC	Winner	
2006	Acme Novelty Library #16	Chris Ware	ACME Novelty	Finalist	
2006	The Rabbi's Cat	Joann Sfar	Pantheon	Finalist	
2006	Tricked	Alex Robinson	Top Shelf	Finalist	
2006	Wilmbledon Green	Seth	Drawn & Quarterly	Finalist	
2007	American Born Chinese	Gene Luen Yang	First Second	Winner	
2007	Billy Hazelnuts	Tony Millionaire	Fantagraphics	Finalist	
2007	Fun Home	Alison Bechdel	Houghton Mifflin	Finalist	
2007	Ninja	Brian Chippendale	Gingko Press	Finalist	
2007	Scrublands	Joe Daly	Fantagraphics	Finalist	
2007	The Ticking	Renée French	Top Shelf	Finalist	
2008	Exit Wounds	Rutu Modan	Drawn & Quarterly	Winner	
2008	The Arrival	Shaun Tan	Arthur A. Levine/Scholastic	Finalist	
2008	Bookhunter	Jason Shiga	Sparkplug Books	Finalist	
2008	Essex County, vols. 1-2: Tales from the Farm/Ghost Stories	Jeff Lemire	Top Shelf	Finalist	
2008	Percy Gloom	Cathy Malkasian	Fantagraphics	Finalist	
2009	Swallow Me Whole	Nate Powell	Top Shelf	Winner	
2009	Alan’s War	Emmanuel Guibert	First Second	Finalist	
2009	Paul Goes Fishing	Michel Rabagliati	Drawn & Quarterly	Finalist	
2009	Skim	Mariko Tamaki and Jillian Tamaki	Groundwood Books	Finalist	
2009	Three Shadows	Cyril Pedrosa	First Second	Finalist	
2010s
2010	Asterios Polyp	David Mazzucchelli	Pantheon	Winner	
2010	A Distant Neighborhood	Jiro Taniguchi	Fanfare/Ponent Mon	Finalist	
2010	The Book of Genesis Illustrated	R. Crumb	Norton	Finalist	
2010	My mommy is in America and she met Buffalo Bill	Jean Regnaud and Émile Bravo	Fanfare/Ponent Mon	Finalist	
2010	The Photographer	Emmanuel Guibert, Didier Lefèvre, and Frédéric Lemerier	First Second	Finalist	
2010	Richard Stark’s Parker: The Hunter	Darwyn Cooke	IDW	Finalist	
2011	Return of the Dapper Men	Jim McCann and Janet Lee	Archaia	Winner (tied)	
2011	Wilson	Daniel Clowes	Drawn & Quarterly	Winner (tied)	
2011	Elmer	Gerry Alanguilan	SLG	Finalist	
2011	Finding Frank and His Friend: Previously Unpublished Work by Clarence ‘Otis’ Dooley	Melvin Goodge	Curio & Co.	Finalist	
2011	Market Day	James Sturm	Drawn & Quarterly	Finalist	
2012	Jim Henson’s Tale	Ramón K. Pérez	Archaia	Winner	
2012	Bubbles & Gondola	Renaud Dillies	NBM	Finalist	
2012	Freeway	Mark Kalesniko	Fantagraphics	Finalist	
2012	Habibi	Craig Thompson	Pantheon	Finalist	
2012	Ivy	Sarah Olekysk	Oni	Finalist	
2012	One Soul	Ray Fawkes	Oni	Finalist	
2013	Building Stories	Chris Ware	Pantheon	Winner	
2013	Goliath	Tom Gauld	Drawn & Quarterly	Finalist	
2013	The Hive	Charles Burns	Pantheon	Finalist	
2013	Unterzakhn	Leela Corman	Schocken	Finalist	
2013	You'll Never Know, Book 3: A Soldier's Heart	C. Tyler	Fantagraphics	Finalist	
2014	The Property	Rutu Modan	Drawn & Quarterly	Winner	
2014	Bluffton: My Summers with Buster	Matt Phelan	Candlewick	Finalist	
2014	The Encyclopedia of Early Earth	Isabel Greenberg	Little, Brown	Finalist	
2014	Good Dog	Graham Chaffee	Fantagraphics	Finalist	
2014	Homesick	Jason Walz	Tinto Press	Finalist	
2014	War Brothers	Sharon McKay and Daniel LaFrance	Annick Press	Finalist	
2015	This One Summer	Mariko Tamaki and Jillian Tamaki	First Second	Winner	
2015	The Gigantic Beard That Was Evil	Stephen Collins	Picador	Finalist	
2015	Here	Richard McGuire	Pantheon	Finalist	
2015	Kill My Mother	Jules Feiffer	Liveright	Finalist	
2015	The Motherless Oven	Rob Davis	SelfMadeHero	Finalist	
2015	Seconds	Bryan Lee O’Malley	Ballantine Books	Finalist	
2016	Ruins	Peter Kuper	SelfMadeHero	Winner	
2016	Long Walk to Valhalla	Adam Smith and Matthew Fox	BOOM!/Archaia	Finalist	
2016	Nanjing: The Burning City	Ethan Young	Dark Horse	Finalist	
2016	Sam Zabel and the Magic Pen	Dylan Horrocks	Fantagraphics	Finalist	
2016	The Thrilling Adventures of Lovelace and Babbage	Sydney Padua	Pantheon	Finalist	
2017	Wonder Woman: The True Amazon	Jill Thompson	DC Comics	Winner	
2017	The Art of Charlie Chan Hock Chye	Sonny Liew	Pantheon	Finalist	
2017	Black Dog: The Dreams of Paul Nash	Dave McKean	Dark Horse	Finalist	
2017	Exits	Daryl Seitchik	Koyama	Finalist	
2017	Mooncop	Tom Gauld	Drawn & Quarterly	Finalist	
2017	Patience	Daniel Clowes	Fantagraphics	Finalist	
2018	My Favorite Thing Is Monsters	Emil Ferris	Fantagraphics	Winner	
2018	Crawl Space	Jesse Jacobs	Koyama Press	Finalist	
2018	Eartha	Cathy Malkasian	Fantagraphics	Finalist	
2018	Stages of Rot	Linnea Sterte	Peow	Finalist	
2018	The Story of Jezebel	Elijah Brubaker	Uncivilized Books	Finalist	
2019	My Heroes Have Always Been Junkies	Ed Brubaker and Sean Phillips	Image	Winner	
2019	Bad Girls	Alex de Campi and Victor Santos	Gallery 13	Finalist	
2019	Come Again	Nate Powell	Top Shelf/IDW	Finalist	
2019	Green Lantern: Earth One Vol. 1	Corinna Bechko and Gabriel Hardman	DC	Finalist	
2019	Homunculus	Joe Sparrow	ShortBox	Finalist	
2019	Sabrina	Nick Drnaso	Drawn & Quarterly	Finalist	
2020s
2020	Are You Listening?	Tillie Walden	First Second/Macmillan	Winner	
2020	Bezimena	Nina Bunjevac	Fantagraphics	Finalist	
2020	BTTM FDRS	Ezra Claytan Daniels and Ben Passmore	Fantagraphics	Finalist	
2020	Life on the Moon	Robert Grossman	Yoe Books/IDW	Finalist	
2020	New World	David Jesus Vignolli	Archaia/BOOM!	Finalist	
2020	Reincarnation Stories	Kim Deitch	Fantagraphics	Finalist	
2021	Pulp	Ed Brubaker and Sean Phillips	Image	Winner	
2021	Dragman	Steven Appleby	Metropolitan	Finalist	
2021	Flake	Matthew Dooley	Jonathan Cape	Finalist	
2021	Labyrinth	Ben Argon	Abrams	Finalist	
2021	Paul at Home	Michel Rabagliati, trans. by Helge Dascher and Rob Aspinall	Drawn & Quarterly	Finalist	
2022	Monsters	Barry Windsor-Smith	Fantagraphics	Winner	
2022	Ballad For Sophie	Filipe Melo and Juan Cavia, trans. by Gabriela Soares	Top Shelf	Finalist	
2022	Destroy All Monsters (A Reckless Book)	Ed Brubaker and Sean Phillips	Image	Finalist	
2022	In.	Will McPhail	Mariner Books	Finalist	
2022	Meadowlark: A Coming-of-Age Crime Story	Ethan Hawke and Greg Ruth	Grand Central Publishing	Finalist	
2023	The Night Eaters, Book 1: She Eats the Night	Marjorie Liu and Sana Takeda	Abrams ComicArts	Winner	
2023	The Book of Niall	Barry Jones	Ellie & Beatty	Finalist	
2023	Crushing	Sophie Burrows	Algonquin Young Readers	Finalist	
2023	Ultrasound	Conor Stechschulte	Fantagraphics	Finalist	
2024	Roaming	Mariko Tamaki and Jillian Tamaki	Drawn & Quarterly)	Winner	
2024	Ashes	Álvaro Ortiz, trans. by Eva Ibarzabal	Top Shelf/IDW	Finalist	
2024	Eden II	K. Wroten	Fantagraphics	Finalist	
2024	A Guest in the House	E.M. Carroll	First Second/Macmillan	Finalist	
2024	Parasocial	Alex de Campi and Erica Henderson	Image	Finalist	
2025	Lunar New Year Love Story	Gene Luen Yang and LeUyen Pham	First Second/Macmillan	Winner	
2025	Final Cut	Charles Burns	Pantheon	Finalist	
2025	My Favorite Thing Is Monsters Book Two	Emil Ferris	Fantagraphics	Finalist	
2025	Sunday	Olivier Schrauwen	Fantagraphics	Finalist	
2025	Victory Parade	Leela Corman	Pantheon	Finalist	
2026	Drome	Jesse Lonergan	23rd St. Books	Winner	
2026	Cannon	Lee Lai	Drawn & Quarterly	Finalist	
2026	The Fable of Erkling Woods	Juni Ba	Goats Flying Press	Finalist	
2026	A Garden of Spheres	Linnea Sterte	Peow2	Finalist	
2026	More Weight: A Salem Story	Ben Wickey	Top Shelf Productions	Finalist	
2026	Shadows of the Sea	Cathy Malkasian	Fantagraphics	Finalist	
