= France Info Prize =

Comic book prize

The France Info Prize for news and reporting comics (French: prix France Info de la Bande dessinée d’actualité et de reportage) is a comic book prize awarded annually by the French public radio station France Info. The jury of the station's journalists chooses from a selection of about ten albums.

== Origins ==
Jean-Christophe Ogier, host of a radio program about comics at France Info, is the founder and organizer of the award since 1994. The award is given each year in the run-up to the Angoulême International Comics Festival in January. The jury is formed by nine radio journalists presided by the director of France Info.

== Award winners ==
Honors,:

- 1994 : La Fille aux Ibis, by Christian Lax and Frank Giroud, Dupuis. ISBN 2-8001-1984-5
- 1995 : L'Homme qui fait le tour du monde by Pierre Christin, Max Cabanes and Philippe Aymond, Dargaud. ISBN 2-205-04201-7
- 1997 : Chiens de fusil, by Christian Lax, Vents d'Ouest. ISBN 2-86967-505-4
- 1998 : Fax de Sarajevo, by Joe Kubert, Vertige Graphic. ISBN 2-908981-28-9
- 1999 : Palestine, t. 1 : Une nation occupée, by Joe Sacco, Vertige Graphic.
- 2000 : Passage en douce. Carnet d'errance, by Helena Klakočar, Fréon. ISBN 2-930204-20-6
- 2001 : Déogratias, by Jean-Philippe Stassen, Dupuis. ISBN 2-8001-2972-7
- 2002 : Persepolis, t. 2, by Marjane Satrapi, L'Association. ISBN 2-84414-079-3
- 2003 : Carnets d'Orient, t. 6, La Guerre fantôme, Jacques Ferrandez, Casterman. ISBN 2-203-39002-6
- 2004 : Soupe froide, Charles Masson, Casterman. ISBN 2-203-39605-9
- 2005 : Le Photographe, t. 2, by Emmanuel Guibert, Didier Lefèvre and Frédéric Lemercier, Dupuis, coll. « Aire Libre ». ISBN 2-8001-3540-9
- 2006 : Les Mauvaises Gens, by Étienne Davodeau, Delcourt, coll. « Encrages ». ISBN 2-84789-449-7
- 2007 : Un homme est mort, by Étienne Davodeau and Kris, Futuropolis. ISBN 2-7548-0010-7
- 2008 : Exit Wounds, by Rutu Modan, Actes Sud BD. ISBN 978-2-7427-7107-3
- 2009 : Le Procès Colonna, by Tignous and Dominique Paganelli, 12 bis. ISBN 978-2-356-48006-4
- 2010 : L’Affaire des affaires, t. 1 L'argent invisible, by Denis Robert, Yan Lindingre and Laurent Astier, Dargaud. ISBN 978-2-205-06188-8
- 2011 : Gaza 1956.En marge de l'Histoire, by Joe Sacco, Futuropolis. ISBN 978-2-7548-0252-9
- 2012 : En cuisine avec Alain Passard, by Christophe Blain, Gallimard. ISBN 978-2-07-069612-3
- 2013 : La voiture d'Intisar: portrait d'une femme moderne au Yémen by Pedro Riera and Nacho Casanova, Delcourt. ISBN 978-2-7560-3491-1
- 2014 : Ainsi se tut Zarathoustra, by Nicolas Wild, La Boîte à bulles / ARTE Éditions. ISBN 978-2-84953-107-5
- 2015 : La Lune est blanche, by Emmanuel Lepage and François Lepage, Futuropolis. ISBN 978-2-7548-1028-9
- 2016 : Catharsis, Luz, Futuropolis. ISBN 978-2-7548-1275-7
- 2017 : Love story à l'iranienne, by Jane Deuxard and Zac Deloupy, Delcourt. ISBN 978-2-7560-6921-0
- 2018 : Brigade des mineurs: immersion au cœur de la brigade de protection des mineurs, de Raynal Pellicer and Titwane, Éditions de la Martinière. ISBN 978-2-7324-7498-4
- 2019 : Indélébiles by Luz, Futuropolis. ISBN 978-2-7548-2398-2
- 2020 : Les Racines de la colère by Vincent Jarousseau and Eddy Vaccaro, Les Arènes
- 2021 : L'Odyssée d'Hakim, t. 3 : De la Macédoine à la France, by Fabien Toulmé, éd. Delcourt
- 2022 : La Cellule, enquête sur les attentats du 13 novembre 2015 by Soren Seelow, Kévin Jackson and Nicolas Otéro, éd. Les Arènes
