= Prix de la critique =

Comics award

The Prix de la critique is a prize awarded by the Association des Critiques et des journalistes de Bande Dessinée to the best comic album released for a year in France. Previously, from 1984 to 2003, it was called Prix Bloody Mary and awarded at the Angoulême International Comics Festival. Concerned at first with albums of the Franco-Belgian comics school it was eventually interested in works coming from the comic book tradition of more distant lands.

The winner of the award for that year is listed first, the others listed below are the nominees.

== 1980s ==
- 1984: Bloody Mary (bande dessinée) by Jean Teulé and Jean Vautrin, Glénat
- 1985: Les Pionniers de l'aventure humaine by François Boucq, Casterman
- 1986: Le Bal de la Sueur by Cromwell, Riff Reb's and Ralph, EDS
- 1987: Jacques Gallard 2: Soviet Zig-Zag by Jean-Louis Tripp and Marc Barcelo, Milan
- 1988: Stars d'un jour by Didier Tronchet, Delcourt
- 1989: Adler (comics) 2: Le repaire du Kanata by René Sterne, Le Lombard

== 1990s ==
- 1990: Le Ventre du Minotaure by Fred Beltran, Les Humanoïdes Associés
- 1991: Les Lumières de l'Amalou 1: Théo by Claire Wendling, Delcourt
- 1992: La bretelle ne passera pas ! by Jean-Luc Abiven, Rackham
- 1993: Le Bar du vieux Français 1 by Jean-Philippe Stassen and Denis Lapière, Dupuis
- 1994: Adam Sarlech 3: Le Testament sous la neige by Frédéric Bézian, Les Humanoïdes Associés
- 1995: L'argent roi collective led by Thierry Groensteen, Autrement
- 1996: L'Histoire du conteur électrique by Fred, Dargaud
- 1997: Il faut le croire pour le voir by Alain Bignon and Jean-Claude Forest, Dargaud
- 1998: Un Ver dans le fruit by Pascal Rabaté, Vents d'Ouest
- 1999: Azrayen' 1 by Christian Lax and Frank Giroud, Dupuis

== 2000s ==
- 2000: Understanding Comics: The Invisible Art (L'Art Invisible) by Scott McCloud, Vertige Graphic
- 2001: From Hell by Alan Moore and Eddie Campbell, Delcourt
  - Le capitaine écarlate by David B. and Emmanuel Guibert, Dupuis
  - Déogratias by Jean-Philippe Stassen, Dupuis
  - Gemma Bovery by Posy Simmonds, Denoël Graphic
  - Pleine Lune by Christophe Chabouté, Vents d'Ouest
- 2002: Stuck Rubber Baby (Un monde de différence) by Howard Cruse, Vertige Graphic
  - Le Cri du peuple (bande dessinée): Les canons de 18 mars by Jacques Tardi and Jean Vautrin, Casterman
  - Le dessin by Marc-Antoine Mathieu, Delcourt
  - Hicksville by Dylan Horrocks, L'Association
  - Rural ! by Étienne Davodeau, Delcourt
- 2003: Jimmy Corrigan by Chris Ware, Delcourt
  - Le chat du rabbin part 1 and 2 by Joann Sfar, Dargaud
  - Petit polio part 3 by Farid Boudjellal, Soleil
  - Quartier lointain part 1 by Jirô Taniguchi, Casterman
  - Quelques mois à l'Amélie by Jean-Claude Denis, Dupuis
- 2004: La Grippe coloniale 1: le retour d'Ulysse by Serge Huo-Chao-Si and Appollo, Vents d'Ouest
- Special 20th Anniversary Award: Le Bar du vieux Français by Jean-Philippe Stassen and Denis Lapière, Dupuis
- 2005: Blankets (Manteau de neige) by Craig Thompson, Casterman
- 2006: Les Mauvaises Gens by Étienne Davodeau, Delcourt
- 2007: Les petits ruisseaux by Pascal Rabaté, Futuropolis
- 2008: Seules contre tous by Miriam Katin, Le Seuil
- 2009: Tamara Drewe by Posy Simmonds, Denoël Graphic

== 2010s ==
- 2010: Dieu en personne by Marc-Antoine Mathieu, Delcourt
- 2011: Asterios Polyp by David Mazzucchelli, Casterman
- 2012: Polina (bande dessinée) by Bastien Vivès, KSTЯ
- 2013: L'Enfance d'Alan by Emmanuel Guibert, L'Association
- 2014: Mauvais Genre (bande dessinée) by Chloé Cruchaudet, Delcourt
- 2015: Moi, assassin by Keko and Antonio Altarriba, Denoël Graphic
- 2016: Zaï zaï zaï zaï by Fabcaro, 6 Pieds sous terre
- 2017: Les Voyages d'Ulysse by Emmanuel Lepage, Daniel Maghen
- 82018: La Terre des fils by Gipi, Futuropolis
- 2019: My Favorite Thing Is Monsters by Emil Ferris, Fantagraphics

== 2020s ==
- 2020: Préférence système by Ugo Bienvenu
- 2021: Peau d'homme by Hubert Boulard and Zanzim
- 2022: René·e aux bois dormants by Elene Usdin, Sarbacane
- 2023: La couleur des choses by Martin Panchaud, çà et là
- 2024: Le Ciel dans la tête by Sergio García Sánchez and Antonio Altarriba, Denoël graphic
- 2025: Deux filles nues by Luz, Albin Michel
- 2026: Les Sentiers d’Anahuac by Jean Dytar and Romain Bertrand, Delcourt

== Sources ==
- Official website (in French), last accessed 19 March 2009
