= 2nd Globes de Cristal Awards =

- Date: 5 February 2007
- Site: Le Lido, Paris, France
- Hosted by: André Manoukian; Élisabeth Quin

Television coverage
- Network: Paris Première

The 2nd Globes de Cristal Award ceremony honoured the best French movies, actors, actresses, plays, concerts, novels, singers, TV series, exhibitions and fashion designers of 2006 and was launched by the French television channel Paris Première. 19 journalists selected a list of five nominees in each of 12 award categories; 3,000 journalists then voted to determine the winners. The ceremony took place on 5 February 2007 at Le Lido in Paris and was broadcast live on the channel Paris Première. The ceremony was chaired by Pierre Lescure and hosted by André Manoukian and Élisabeth Quin.

The dinner included foie gras, veal piccata and a blancmange for dessert. Celebrities in attendance included: Ophélie Winter, Lio, Annie Girardot, Michèle Bernier, Christophe Malavoy, Orlando, Helena Noguerra, Olivia Ruiz, Marina Hands, Bérénice Bejo, Dominique Besnehard, Mathilda May, Léa Drucker, Marc Cerrone, Mazarine Pingeot, Vahina Giocante and Jean-Michel Ribes.

Highlights of the ceremony included a shirtless Philippe Katerine performing Louxor j'adore and designer Ora-Ito complimenting his fiancée's body as his muse: "C'est son corps qui m'inspire. Elle a le plus beau corps".

== Winners and nominees ==
The winners are denoted in bold.

=== Cinema ===
Best Film
- **Tell No One** – **Guillaume Canet**
- Avenue Montaigne – Danièle Thompson
- OSS 117: Cairo, Nest of Spies – Michel Hazanavicius
- When I Was a Singer – Xavier Giannoli
- The Page Turner – Denis Dercourt
Best Actor
- **François Cluzet** – **Tell No One**
- Jean Dujardin – OSS 117: Cairo, Nest of Spies
- Albert Dupontel – Locked Out
- Gérard Depardieu – When I Was a Singer
- Roschdy Zem – Mauvaise foi
Best Actress
- **Léa Drucker** – **The Man of My Life**
- Mélanie Laurent – Don't Worry, I'm Fine
- Charlotte Gainsbourg – I Do
- Cécile de France – Avenue Montaigne
- Marina Hands – Lady Chatterley

=== Television ===
Best TV Series / TV Movie
- **Petits meurtres en famille** – **Edwin Baily**
- Samantha oups! – David Strajmayster
- Spiral – Alexandra Clert & Guy-Patrick Sainderichin
- David Nolande – Nicolas Cuche
- Djihad – Felix Olivier
Best TV Show / Documentary
- **Chirac : Le Jeune Loup et le Vieux Lion** – **Patrick Rotman**

=== Theater ===
Best Play
- **Cyrano de Bergerac** – **Denis Podalydès**
Best Musical
- **Macadam Macadam** – **Blanca Li**
Best One Man Show
- **Édouard Baer** – **La Folle et Véritable Histoire de Luigi Prizzoti**

=== Literature ===
Best Novel or Essay
- **Marilyn dernières séances** – **Michel Schneider**
Best Comic Book
- **The Photographer** – **Emmanuel Guibert & Didier Lefèvre**

=== Music ===
Best Female Singer
- **Olivia Ruiz** – **La Femme Chocolat**
Best Male Singer
- **Philippe Katerine** – **Robots après tout**

=== Others ===
Best Multimedia Artist
- **Gérard Rondeau**
Best Architect
- **Jakob + MacFarlane**
Best Designer
- **Ito Morabito**
Best Fashion Designer
- **John Galliano**

== See also ==
- 32nd César Awards
