= Angoulême International Comics Festival Essentials =

French comics award

Les Essentiels d'Angoulême ("The Essentials of Angoulême") is a comics award chosen by the jury of the Angoulême International Comics Festival since 2007, selecting five albums from a longlist of some fifty. Subsidiary awards chosen by the same jury are the Essentiel Révélation (best first album, successor of the Angoulême International Comics Festival Prize for First Comic Book) and Essentiel Patrimoine (successor of the Angoulême International Comics Festival Prize for Inheritance).

Since 2008, the Angoulême International Comics Festival Prize Awarded by the Audience has also been renamed Essentiel FNAC-SNCF, and the Angoulême International Comics Festival Prix Jeunesse 9-12 ans has become the Essentiel Jeunesse.

== Winners ==
Year	Title	Author(s)	Publisher
2007	Black Hole	Charles Burns	Delcourt
2007	Lupus	Frederik Peeters	Atrabile
2007	Pourquoi j’ai tué Pierre	Olivier Ka (writer) and Alfred (artist)	Delcourt
2007	Lucille	Ludovic Debeurme	Futuropolis
2007	Le Photographe	Emmanuel Guibert with assistance from Frédéric Lemercier based on the story and with the photographs of Didier Lefèvre	Dupuis
2008	Exit Wounds	Rutu Modan	Actes Sud BD
2008	Ma maman est en Amérique, elle a rencontré Buffalo Bill	Jean Regnaud (writer) and Émile Bravo (artist)	Gallimard
2008	La Marie en Plastique	Pascal Rabaté (writer) and David Prudhomme (artist)	Futuropolis
2008	Trois Ombres	Cyril Pedrosa	Delcourt
2008	R.G.	Frederik Peeters, based on the story by Pierre Dragon	Gallimard
2009	Lulu femme nue, first book	Étienne Davodeau	Futuropolis
2009	Martha Jane Cannary, part 1 : Les Années 1852-1869	Christian Perrissin (writer) and Matthieu Blanchin (artist)	Futuropolis
2009	Le Petit Christian, part 2	Blutch	L'Association
2009	Une Aventure de Spirou et Fantasio par ..., t. 4 : Le Journal d'un ingénu	Émile Bravo	Dupuis
2009	Tamara Drewe	Posy Simmonds	Denoël Graphic
