= Deogratias: A Tale of Rwanda =

Deogratias: A Tale of Rwanda (Déogratias)
- Cover of the First Second edition by Jean-Philippe Stassen
- Main characters: Deogratias; Apollinaria; Benina; Brother Philip
- Page count: 96 pages

Creative team
- Writers: Jean-Philippe Stassen
- Artists: Jean-Philippe Stassen
- Creators: Jean-Philippe Stassen

Original publication
- Published in: Dupuis
- Date of publication: October 2000
- Language: French
- ISBN: 2-8001-2972-7

Translation
- Publisher: First Second Books
- Date: June 2006
- ISBN: 1-59643-103-2
- Translator: Alexis Siegel

Deogratias: A Tale of Rwanda is a graphic novel written and drawn by Jean-Philippe Stassen, published by First Second Books.

== Publication history ==
The book was published in French in 2000 by Dupuis and has appeared in a number of different translations. It was translated into English by Alexis Siegel and published in 2006 by First Second.

== Plot summary ==
The story takes place before, during, and after the genocide in Rwanda; told through parallel storylines. It is divided between the present day and Deogratias' flashbacks, denoted by black borders for the former and blank borders for the latter. It follows Deogratias, a Hutu teenager who has been unstable ever since his two Tutsi friends died in the genocide. The story begins after the genocide. Deogratias is at a bar and meets an old friend, a French sergeant. Deogratias has flashbacks to his life before the genocide. He remembers the crush he had on the two girls and how he tried to spend time with them. In the flashbacks, Deogratias wasn't always a good person. We meet other people in the story. The two tribes in the country didn't get along. Deogratias was a bit caught in the middle of the feud, having been forced to join the "Interahamwe". His life after the genocide seems very bad.

In day three of Deogratias returns to the town looking for urwagwa (banana beer) because he is turning into a dog again, but doesn't. Because he talks to Julius about killing the Tutsis, then he begins to think of how the father and brother Philip left and the others stayed and hid.

== Characters ==
Deogratias - The main character of the book. He is a Hutu boy in Rwanda during the genocide. He struggles between good and evil actions throughout the novel . He also becomes mentally unstable as the book continues. He continuously turns into a dog to represent him changing into one of the people who are killing the Hutu and Tutsis.

Venetia - A Tutsi women and mother of Benina and Apollinaria. She works as a prostitute at a local hotel, soliciting in sexual manners. It is revealed that she and Father Stanislass where once lovers.

Apollinaria - Venetia's oldest daughter who works at the church. Deogratias pines after her though she denies him. She is very angered by the thoughts of being called a cockroach and is protective of her sister when she finds out early in the book that she is in a relationship with Deogratias.

Benina - Apollinaria's half sister, she is also Tutsi. Benina is involved in a romantic relationship with Deogratias.

Brother Philip - A young man who goes to Rwanda in order to try to bring religion and civility to the Rwandans. Who also at the end lets Deogratias confess to him and listen to all of Deogratias' stories.

Father Prior Stanislas - A white priest who runs the local church. Deogratias steals money from him, catching him in a lie. He is known to have had an affair with Venitia, and also is Appollinaria's father.

Augustine - a Twa man who works at the church and childhood friend of Venetia. He has an infant daughter named Marie.

Julius - A leader in the Hutu militia called the "interahamwa". He forcefully makes Deogratias join his group and participate in the killing.

Bosco - An officer in the Tutsi-led Rwandan Patriotic Front who often supplies Deogratias with banana beer.

Sergeant/The Frenchman - A French military officer who assisted the Interahamwe during the genocide.

== Editions ==
The various editions and translations include:

- French: Dupuis, 2000. ISBN 2-8001-2972-7
- Dutch: Uitgeverij Dupuis, 2000
- Portuguese: ASA, 2005. ISBN 972-41-3372-9
- Italian : Nuovi Equilibri, 2005. ISBN 88-7226-872-9
- English: First Second, 2006. ISBN 1-59643-103-2
- Spanish: Planeta DeAgostini, 2008.

== Critical reception ==
Deogratias received overwhelmingly positive reviews by a number of literary publications including Publishers Weekly who wrote: "The heartbreaking power of Deogratias is how it keeps the reader distant from the atrocities by showing the trivial cruelties of everyday life before and after the genocide."

== Awards ==
The book won the 2000 René Goscinny award, the 2001 Angoulême International Comics Festival Media award and the 2007 "Best Reprint Publication" Glyph Comics Awards. It was also nominated for the Angoulême International Comics Festival Prize for Best Album and Prix de la critique in 2001.

The book also made the 2007 Young Adult Library Services Association list of "Great Graphic Novel for Teens".

== See also ==
- Bibliography of the Rwandan Genocide
