= Lucas Wars =

Comic about filmmaker George Lucas

Lucas Wars (Les Guerres de Lucas)
- Author(s): Renaud Roche, Laurent Hopman
- Publisher(s): 23rd St. (English edition), Deman Éditions (French edition)
- Genre: Biography
- Original language: French
- Followed by: Les Guerres de Lucas - Épisode 2

Lucas Wars (originally Les Guerres de Lucas) is a 2023 French biographical graphic novel, written by Laurent Hopman and illustrated by Renaud Roche. It is a biography of filmmaker George Lucas, and the behind-the-scenes struggles he faced to produce the 1977 feature film Star Wars. It was released in France by Deman Editions on October 4, 2023, and in the United States by 23rd Street Books (an imprint of Macmillan Publishers) on September 16, 2025.

== Synopsis ==
Lucas Wars tells the story of filmmaker George Lucas, and the struggles he faced in produce the first Star Wars film in 1977.

== Release ==
Before its release, the rights to Lucas Wars had already been purchased for publication in 15 countries.

The French edition Les Guerres de Lucas was published on 4 October 2023 by Deman Éditions.

The English translation Lucas Wars was released in September 2025.

In October 2025, Les Guerres de Lucas - Épisode 2 (Lucas Wars - Episode 2) was released in France. It tells the story of the production of The Empire Strikes Back and the creation of Indiana Jones.

== Critical reception ==
The magazine Le Point praises it as a fast-paced, sensitive graphic novel, a credible and sensitive portrait of George Lucas, and appreciates the important presence of two Star Wars heroes who are too rarely celebrated: Marcia Lucas, unofficial consultant to her husband, and the visionary producer Alan Ladd.

The website Culture Tops appreciated the work and felt the story was almost as exciting as Star Wars itself.

The comic book website Actua BD highlighted the significant research as well as a successful drawing by Renaud Roche. They felt it was a graphic novel accessible to fans as well as to neophytes of the Star Wars universe, the authors having succeeded in maintaining the right balance between homage to the saga, biography of the director and discovery of the underside of cinema.

The cultural webzine Benzine highlighted the choice of the title of the book, perfectly adapted to what George Lucas had to face, and the beautiful cover. However, they would have liked the authors to feature more of the innovations in Star Wars, like the very first use of computer-assisted cameras.

== Awards ==
- France Info Prize - News and Reporting Comic Book Award (2024)
- Fnac France Inter - BD Award (2024)
- Prix des Libraires Canal BD - Special mention Pass Culture (2024)
