= Emmanuel Guibert =

French comic artist and writer (born 1964)

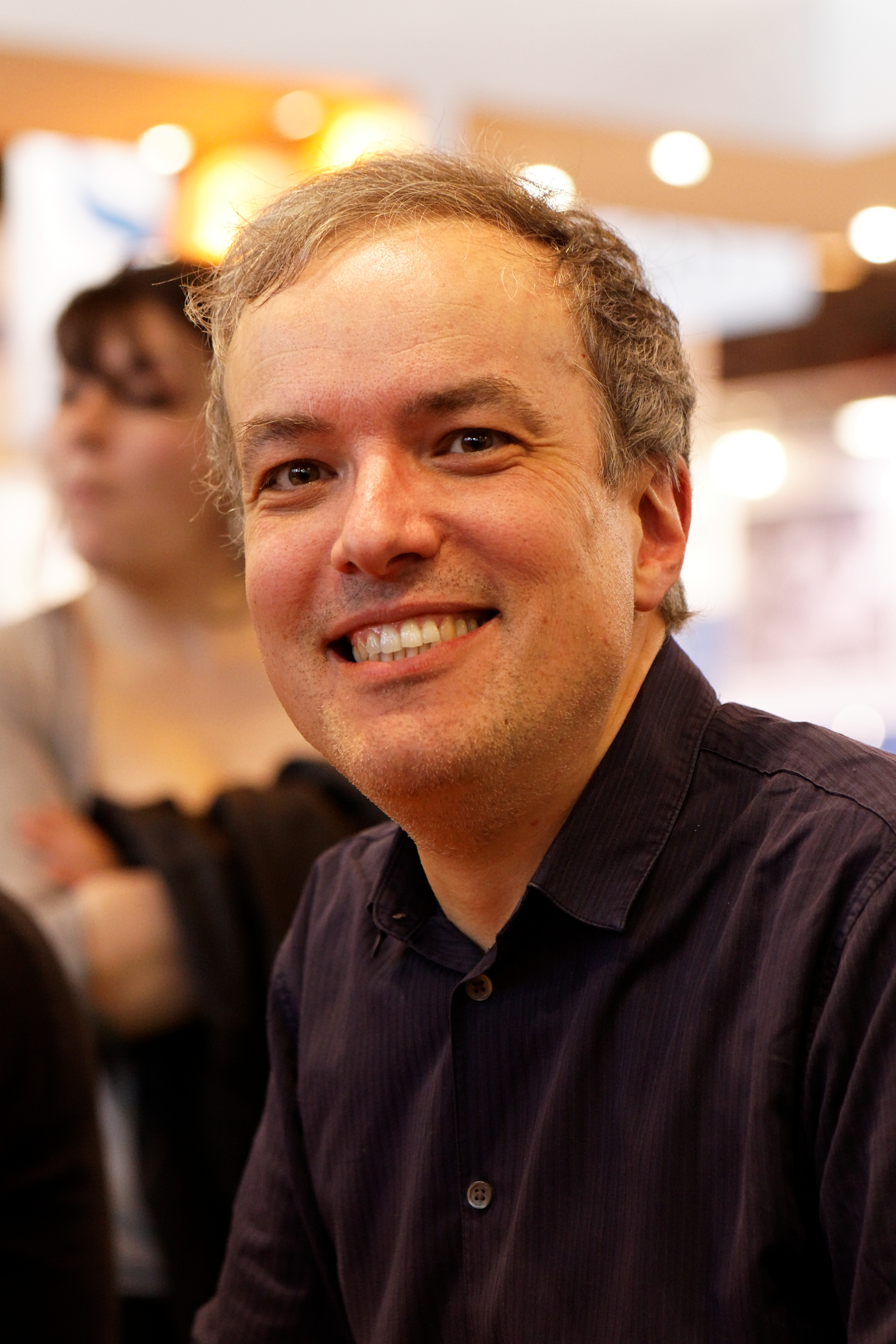
- Emmanuel Guilbert in 2011
- Born: April 21, 1964 (age 62) Paris, France
- Areas: Cartoonist, Artist
- Notable works: The Photographer; Alan's War; Ariol; Sardine de l'espace
- Awards: Ordre des Arts et des Lettres (2013); Grand Prix de la ville d'Angoulême (2020) (see full list)

Emmanuel Guibert (born April 21, 1964, in Paris) is a French comics artist and writer. For his work, he has been awarded the French Ordre des Arts et des Lettres and the Grand Prix de la ville d'Angoulême.

== Biography ==
After a short period in art school, Guibert found work as an illustrator and storyboarder. He began Brune, an album retracing the rise of Nazism in Germany in the 1930s. Brune was published in 1992, after seven years of work.

In 1999, he began the series Ariol, written by Marc Boutavant, which originated in the children's magazine J'aime lire. Ariol has been collected into seventeen volumes, eleven of which have been translated into English by Papercutz. A French-Canadian series of animated shorts of the same title were also produced.

Guibert became associated with the magazine Lapin and L'Association (alongside Frédéric Boilet, Émile Bravo, Fabrice Tarrin, Christophe Blain, and Joann Sfar), which marked an evolution of his work to the service of real-life stories.

The first example was La Guerre d'Alan ("Alan's War"), which was serialized in Lapin in 2000; it recounts the memories of Alan Ingram Cope, an American soldier from World War II living in France. This was followed by Le Photographe ("The Photographer"), the story of Didier Lefèvre, a French photojournalist who accompanied a Médecins Sans Frontières mission during the height of the Soviet–Afghan War in 1986. The Photographer sold 250,000 copies in France and won the Essentials of Angoulême award in 2007. It has been translated from the original French into 11 languages; the American edition won the Eisner Award for Best U.S. Edition of International Material in 2010.

During this same period, he created several series, including Sardine de l'espace, Les Olives noirs, and La Fille du professeur ("The Professor's Daughter") (with Joann Sfar).

In 2013, Guibert was awarded the Ordre des Arts et des Lettres in recognition of his significant contributions to the arts.

In January 2018, the Angoulême International Comics Festival dedicated an exhibition to Guibert's work.

After being a finalist for the Grand Prix de la ville d'Angoulême in 2019, he was finally elected by the authors during the festival the following year. The Grand Prix is considered the most prestigious award in Franco-Belgian comics.

In 2020, he became the first comic book author to whom the Académie des Beaux-Arts dedicated an exhibition.

In January 2023, Gubert was elected member of the engraving and drawing section of the Academy of Fine Arts. He occupies the chair of Pierre-Yves Trémois, who died in 2020.

== Awards ==
- 1997 Angoulême International Comics Festival René Goscinny award for La Fille du professeur, with Joann Sfar
- 1998 Angoulême International Comics Festival Prize for First Comic Book for La Fille du professeur, with Joann Sfar
- 2001:
  - (nomination) Angoulême International Comics Festival Prize for Best Album for Le capitaine écarlate, with David B.
  - (nomination) Prix de la critique for Le capitaine écarlate, with David B.
- 2002 (nomination) Angoulême International Comics Festival Prize for Artwork for Les olives noires: Pourquoi cette nuit est-elle, with Joann Sfar
- 2004 Prix des libraires de bande dessinée for Le Photographe, with Didier Lefèvre and Frédéric Lemercier
- 2005 France Info Prize for Le Photographe vol. 2
- 2007:
  - Angoulême International Comics Festival Essentials for Le Photographe
  - Cybils Award: Young Adult prize, for The Professor's Daughter (translation of La Fille du professuer)
  - 2nd Globes de Cristal Awards for Best Comic Book for Le Photographe
  - Villa Kujoyama Prize
- 2009:
  - (nomination) Eisner Award for Best Reality-Based Work for Alan's War
  - Grand Boum-Ville de Blois (bd BOUM Festival) for lifetime achievement
- 2010 Eisner Award for Best U.S. Edition of International Material for The Photographer
- 2013 Ordre des Arts et des Lettres
- 2017 Angoulême International Comics Festival René Goscinny award
- 2019 (nomination) Grand Prix de la ville d'Angoulême
- 2020 Grand Prix de la ville d'Angoulême

== Bibliography ==
- Brune (Éditions Albin Michel, 1992) ISBN 2-226-05998-9
- La Fille du professeur (art), with Joann Sfar (story), Dupuis, coll. « Humour libre », 1997. ISBN 2-8001-2481-4
- A story in Hommage à M. Pinpon (L'Association, 1997)
- "Light 2000," a story in Comix 2000 (L'Association, 1999)
- Contributor to Lapins (L'Association, 2000)
- Va et Vient (L'Association, 2005)
- Sardine de l'espace (writing, artwork as of vol. 9), with Joann Sfar (artwork until vol. 8) (Bayard Presse):
1. Le doigt dans l'œil, 2000
2. Le bar des ennemis, 2000
3. La machine à laver la cervelle, 2001
4. Les voleurs de yaourts, 2001
5. Le championnat de boxe, 2002
6. Le capitaine Tout Rouge, 2002
7. La Grande Sardine, 2003
8. Les tatouages carnivores, 2003
9. Montagne électorale, 2004
- Sardine de l'espace, 2nd series (writing, artwork vols. 5–7), with Joann Sfar (artwork until vol. 4), with Mathieu Sapin (from vol. 8), Dargaud:
1. Platine Laser, 2007
2. Zacar et les Zacariens, 2007
3. Il faut éliminer Toxine, 2008
4. Le Remonte-Kiki, 2008
5. Mon œil !, 2008
6. La Cousine Manga, 2007
7. Pizza Tomik, 2008
8. Les Secrets de l'Univers, 2009
9. Le Loto des nombrils, 2010
10. La reine de l'Afripe, 2011
11. L'archipel des Hommes-sandwichs, 2012
12. Môssieur Susupe et Môssieur Krokro, 2013
13. Le mange-manga, 2014
- La Guerre d'Alan (L'Association):
1. Vol. 1, 2000 ISBN 2-84414-036-X
2. Vol. 2, 2002 ISBN 2-84414-078-5
3. Vol. 3, 2008 ISBN 978-2-84414-261-0 — Official sélection of the Angoulême Festival, 2009
  - Monovolume grand format (L'Association, 2009) ISBN 978-2-84414-314-3
  - Monovolume (L'Association, 2010)
- L'Enfance d'Alan (L'Association, 2012) ISBN 978-2-84414-455-3
- Martha & Alan (L'Association, 2016) ISBN 978-2-84414-593-2 — Official sélection of the Angoulême Festival, 2017
- Le Capitaine écarlate (art), with David B. (story) (Dupuis, 2000) ISBN 2-8001-2971-9
- Les Olives noires (art), with Joann Sfar (story) (Dupuis, Marcinelle):
1. Pourquoi cette nuit est-elle différente des autres nuits ?, 2001 ISBN 2-8001-3149-7
2. Adam Harishon, 2002 ISBN 2-8001-3220-5
3. Tu ne mangeras pas le chevreau dans le lait de sa mère, 2003. ISBN 2-8001-3378-3
- Ariol (art), with Marc Boutavant (story), Bayard Presse:
1. Debout !, 2002
2. Jeux idiots, 2002
3. Bête comme un âne, sale comme un cochon..., 2003
4. Le vaccin à réaction, 2003
5. Karaté, 2004
6. Oh, la mer !, 2006
- Ariol (new edition) (art), with Marc Boutavant (story), Bd kids:
1. Un petit âne comme vous, 2011 (reprinting the stories Debout, Bête comme un âne, sale comme un cochon, et Jeux idiots);
2. Le chevalier cheval, 2011
3. Copain comme cochon, 2011
4. Une jolie vache, 2011
5. Bisbille fait mouche, 2011
6. Chat méchant, 2011
7. Le maître-chien, 2012
8. Les trois baudets, 2013
9. Les dents du lapin, 2014
10. Les petits rats de l'Opéra, 2016
11. La fête à la grenouille, 2017
12. Le coq sportif, 2017
13. Le canard calé, 2017
14. Ce nigaud d'agneau, 2018
15. Touche pas à mon veau, 2019
16. Naphtaline nous dit toutou, 2020
17. La chouette classe verte , 2021
18. Vieux sac à puces ! , 2022
- Ariol : Où est Pétula ?, 2013 (Hors-série);
- Le Photographe (story and art based on the story of Didier Lefèvre) (Dupuis, 2008):
1. Vol. 1, 2003 ISBN 2-8001-3372-4
2. Vol. 2, 2004 ISBN 2-8001-3540-9
3. Vol. 3, 2006 ISBN 2-8001-3544-1
- HS. Conversations avec le photographe (Dupuis 2009) ISBN 978-2-8001-4558-7
- Participation in the exquisite corpse Oupus 2 (L’Association, 2003)
- Participation in Oupus 4 (L'Association/Oubapo, 2005)
- "Shin.Ichi" in Japon (Casterman, 2005)
- Tom-Tom et Nana vol. 33 : Ben ça alors ! (story), with Bernadette Després (art) (Bayard/Bayard Poche, 2005)
- Va et vient (L'Association, 2005)
- Des nouvelles d'Alain: première partie (story and art in collaboration with photographer Alain Keler and Frédéric Lemercier), in revue XXI (Vingt et un) #8, autumn 2009
- Rupestres ! collective, with Étienne Davodeau, Marc-Antoine Mathieu, Troub's, David Prudhomme, and Pascal Rabaté (Futuropolis, 2011)

=== English translations ===
- (with Joann Sfar) Sardine in Outer Space (First Second Books, 2006–2008)
- (with Joann Sfar) The Professor's Daughter (First Second Books, 2007)
- Alan's War: The Memories of G.I. Alan Cope (First Second Books, 2008)
- (with photojournalist Didier Lefèvre and colorist Frédéric Lemercier) The Photographer (First Second Books, 2009)
- Ariol (Papercutz):
1. Just a Donkey Like You and MeISBN 978-1597073998, 19 February 2013
2. BThunder HorseISBN 978-1597074124, 4 June 2013
3. Happy as a Pig...ISBN 978-1597074872, 10 December 2013
4. A Beautiful CowISBN 978-1597075138, 6 May 2014
5. Bizzbilla Hits the BullseyeISBN 978-1597077354, 12 August 2014
6. A Nasty Cat ISBN 978-1629911571, 10 February 2015
7. Top Dog ISBN 978-1629912806, 5 January 2016
8. The Three Donkeys ISBN 978-1629914398, 26 April 2016
9. The Teeth of the Rabbit ISBN 978-1629916026, 29 November 2016
10. The Little Rats of the Opera ISBN 978-1629917368, 27 June 2017
  - Where's Petula? ISBN 978-1629911861, 26 May 2015
