= Ariol =

1999 French comic strip

Ariol is a 1999 comic strip which originated in the French children's magazine J'aime lire. It is by Marc Boutavant (story) and Emmanuel Guibert (art).

The comic has been collected into seventeen volumes so far, eleven of which have been translated into English by Papercutz. A French-Canadian series of animated shorts of the same title was also produced.

== Characters ==
• Ariol's father, Avoine Picotin (nicknamed Voinou by his wife): a donkey, 39 years old, works a lot, is an accountant in a large company located in a business district, drives a Renault 16. He can sometimes be straight and strict with Ariol only for his own good.

• Vanesse: A young, intelligent, shy, and sensitive girl. She has Asian origins, specifically from Koumkouat (a fictional country inspired by Vietnam).

• Bisbille Cantharide: a young girl, deeply in love with Ariol, class representative like him, an excellent student who doesn't hesitate to whisper answers to him in class and defend him, especially against Tiburge. Her father is an ophthalmologist, and Ariol is one of his patients.

• The Knight Horse: super-horse, Ariol's hero who never misses any of his episodes on TV and reads all his comics.

• Papi Atole (Atole Picotin): Father of Avoine and grandfather of Ariol, a little deaf. He lives in the town of Saint-Ampoire, drives a Renault 4 .

• Fofifon: The little guy from the fourth grade, he's inseparable from Tiburge, with whom he loves to annoy Ariol. He has divergent strabismus .

• Mr. Le Blount (Frolic Le Blount): large spaniel [ 11 ], Ariol's teacher, with classic methods, often strict but always fair, generally appreciated by Ariol.

• Ariol Picotin: a blue donkey with big glasses, the series' hero, friend of Ramono, in love with Pétula, and enemy of Tiburge. Nicknamed Riri by his parents, he is 9 and a half years old, then 10 years old from volume 13 onwards. A fourth-grade student, studious without being brilliant, he dreams of being a horse, like the Knight Horse, his favorite cartoon hero, whose books and merchandise he owns in their entirety.

• Crouline: A shy pig who doesn't run fast and likes Ariol. In one episode, we learn that she is in love with Ramono.

• Granny Donkey (Asine Boronali): Ariol's grandmother, Mule's mother, and Uncle Petro's mother. A widow for fifteen years, she lives in a lovely apartment downtown and regularly babysits Ariol, whom she loves to spoil and with whom she shares special moments, for example, at the movies with her friend Ramono. A sensitive and tender soul, sometimes overwhelmed by her emotions, she can be distracted by a faulty memory, often forgetting her belongings or where they are. She also has trouble remembering the exact names of people she speaks to.

• Patouche: A prankster in Ariol's class, a football enthusiast, with a somewhat immature character.

• Petula Machicoulis: a pretty little cow with whom Ariol is madly in love. She has several brothers and inherited her strong character from her father's southern origins. She hates the nickname "Moumoute" her mother gives her. Very resourceful, especially when it comes to physical activities and sports, she is aware of Ariol's feelings for her and doesn't hesitate to play on them, appearing by turns manipulative, pretentious, indifferent, sometimes unpleasant or hypocritical, and occasionally kind, particularly when Ariol gives her gifts. She may even exploit the rivalry between Ariol and Tiburge, her other suitor.

• Matroune: Albatross, friend with Silhouette.

• Naphtaline: an Afghan hound, Petula's best friend and inseparable companion. Sensitive to Tiburge's boasting, she doesn't particularly like Ariol and detests Ramono, a feeling that reciprocates. A fan of the singer Stronzy, she takes great care with her appearance.

• Kwax: A duckling, friend of Ariol, and a great music lover (he is very often depicted with headphones or a musical instrument), he plays the piano and recorder, and composes all the music for the class songs. His father plays the double bass in an orchestra . His family is friends with a Roma community, whom Kwax visits regularly.

• Pharamousse: A very fearful, hypochondriac lamb, often excused from sports by the excuses he presents to the PE teacher Mr. Ribéra.

• Bitonio: an athletic rabbit, certain of his superiority over his companions, who don't dispute it. Suffering from a lisp, he can't pronounce the "s" or "j" sounds, which are replaced by "f" and "z" respectively. He's a good friend of Tiburge, without disliking Ariol.

• Pouyastruc: A calf, rather kind to Ariol, who envies him for being friends with Petula and Naphtaline. Seeing a psychologist, he is also a victim of bullying by some of the fifth graders, which leads Petula to ask her father for help in dissuading them.

• Silhouette: Goose in Ariol's class, friend of Matroune and football enthusiast

• Tiburge: A kitten in Ariol's class, he despises Ariol (whom he nicknames Donkey) to the point of being his rival, especially since he regularly boasts about his exploits (and those of his father), which Ariol doesn't believe at all, unlike Petula, who is quite taken with them. Often surrounded by his friends (Bitonio, Brouhaha, and especially Fofifon), Tiburge likes to show off his latest gadgets and play football, including with Ariol.

• Brouhaha: Puppy, very mocking and friend of Tiburge, he regularly attacks Ariol.

• Batégaille: Ariol's class horse, particularly sluggish and apathetic, he's always falling asleep (the complete opposite of the Knight Horse), which greatly annoys Ariol, who dreams of being a horse. Both sleepwalking and narcoleptic, Batégaille is prone to sometimes abrupt awakenings, which both amuses and worries his classmates.

• Ariol's mother, Mule Picotin, 34 years old (originally named Mule Boronali) (nicknamed Mumule by her husband): a donkey, is gentle with Ariol. We learn in volume 18 that she works as a lawyer.

• Grandma Annette (Annette Picotin): Mother of Avoine and grandmother of Ariol, also deaf but kind. She also lives in Saint-Ampoire.

• Ramono Lévèque: a piglet, Ariol's best friend despite having a very different lifestyle—he's very dirty and a bit rude. He struggles in a troubled family environment; his mother (named Olida) is separated from his father, who is in a relationship with a sow. He constantly argues with Porcine, his older sister. Although he's last in his class, he doesn't suffer too much and embraces his underachieving nature, making fun of his teachers and classmates, including Bisbille and Pétula, with whom he doesn't get along at all. Ramono lives mainly with his sister and mother, forming a modest family. Their house is rather dirty and messy. The name Ramono evokes ham ( jamón in Spanish) and his porcine nature.

• Porcine: Ramono's older sister. She hates her little brother.

== Episodes ==
1 - Match Point

2 - Standing

3 - The Knight Horse

4 - Moumoute

== Books ==
- Book 1: Just a Donkey Like You and Me, ISBN 978-1597073998, 19 February 2013
- Book 2: Thunder Horse, ISBN 978-1597074124, 4 June 2013
- Book 3: Happy as a Pig..., ISBN 978-1597074872, 10 December 2013
- Book 4: A Beautiful Cow, ISBN 978-1597075138, 6 May 2014
- Book 5: Bizzbilla Hits the Bullseye, ISBN 978-1597077354, 12 August 2014
- Book 6: A Nasty Cat, ISBN 978-1629911571, 10 February 2015
- Book 7: Top Dog, ISBN 978-1629912806, 5 January 2016
- Book 8: The Three Donkeys, ISBN 978-1629914398, 26 April 2016
- Book 9: The Teeth of the Rabbit, ISBN 978-1629916026, 29 November 2016
- Book 10: The Little Rats of the Opera, ISBN 978-1629917368, 27 June 2017

Un-numbered:

- Where's Petula?, ISBN 978-1629911861, 26 May 2015

Untranslated:

- Ariol Coffret Jeux Coucoule, ISBN 978-2747053303 ("Ariol Super Cool Game Kit")
- Le vaccin à réaction, ISBN 978-2747009508 ("The Vaccination Side Effect")
- La fête à la grenouille ("The Frog Party")
- Le coq sportif ("The Sporty Rooster")
- Le canard calé ("The Clever Duck")
- Ce nigaud d'agneau ("The Silly Lamb")
