= Actus Tragicus (comics) =

Artistic collective of five Israeli comics artists

Actus studio
- Type: Comics studio
- Founded: 1995
- Founder: Rutu Modan; Yirmi Pinkus
- Defunct: 2010
- Headquarters: Israel
- Key people: Current: Batia Kolton; Itzik Rennert; Mira Friedmann; Rutu Modan; Yirmi Pinkus

Actus Tragicus, sometimes credited as Actus Comics or simply Actus, is a group of five Israeli comics artists founded in 1995 by Rutu Modan and Yirmi Pinkus. Other members include Batia Kolton, Itzik Rennert and Mira Friedmann.

Actus Tragicus was founded to enable its members, all professional illustrators and comics artists, to reach an audience outside of Israel by publishing a book each year, free of any cultural limitations or economic hindrances. Their books appear around the time of the Angoulême International Comics Festival in France where they receive their first public exposure. The group has won international acclaim and was described in 2007 by the ID design magazine as one of the most prominent contemporary design groups. Well known international comics artists such as Anke Feuchtenberger and Henning Wagenbreth (Germany), Stéphane Blanquet (France) and David Polonsky (Israel) participated in the Actus Tragicus projects. Actus Tragicus have published nine books and numerous series so far, as well as a special comics album, Dead Herring Comics, which featured an excerpt from Art Spiegelman's In the Shadow of No Towers.

== Bibliography ==
- Small Series, Tel Aviv, Actus Tragicus, 1995. (out of print)
- Silver Series, Tel Aviv, Actus Tragicus, 1996.(out of print)
- Victor Series, Tel Aviv, Actus Tragicus, 1998. (out of print)
- Jetlag, Tel Aviv, Top Shelf Productions, 1999, ISBN 965-90221-0-7

Based on short stories by Etgar Keret

- Flippers 1 & 2, Top Shelf Productions, 2000 ISBN 965-90221-1-5
- The Actus Box: Five Graphic Novellas, Top Shelf Productions, 2001, ISBN 978-965-90221-3-7
- Happy End, Top Shelf Productions, 2002, ISBN 978-965-90221-4-4
- Dead Herring Comics, Top Shelf Productions, 2004, ISBN 978-965-90221-5-1
- How to Love, Tel Aviv, Actus Independent Comics, 2007, ISBN 978-965-90221-6-8
- Tel Aviv Berlin, ein Reisebuch, Avant Verlag, Germany, ISBN 978-3-939080-45-9
