= Angoulême International Comics Festival René Goscinny award =

Comics writer award at the Angoulême festival

The René Goscinny award, named after the writer of Asterix and Lucky Luke, is awarded to comic writers at the Angoulême International Comics Festival. It was first awarded in 1988 and 1992, every year between 1995 and 2008, and again since 2017. The award is given in order to encourage young comic writers, those whose comic careers have only begun to flourish. The awardee is chosen by a jury mostly composed of comics specialists: authors, journalists, and Angoulême festival organizers. The winner receives 5000 euro.

== 1980s ==
- 1988: Pierre-Jean Bichose for Colère obscure, artist Zimmermann, Dargaud
- 1989: No award given

== 1990s ==
- 1990 – 1991: No awards given
- 1992: Claude Carré for Le Pays miroir: l'Incendiaire, Dargaud
- 1993 – 1994: No awards given
- 1995: Sylvain Chomet for Léon la came, in collaboration with Nicolas de Crécy, Casterman
- 1996: Nicolas Dumontheuil for Qui a tué l'idiot, Casterman
- 1997: Joann Sfar for La fille du professeur, artist Emmanuel Guibert, Dupuis
- 1998: Tonino Benacquista for L'Outremangeur, Casterman
- 1999: Éric Liberge for Monsieur Mardi-Gras Descendres, Zone créative

== 2000s ==
- 2000: Jean-Philippe Stassen for Déogratias, Dupuis
- 2001: Emile Bravo for La Réplique Inattendue, Dargaud
- 2002: Hervé Bourhis for Thomas ou le retour du Tabou, Les Humanoïdes Associés
- 2003: Riad Sattouf for Les Pauvres Aventures de Jérémie part 1, Dargaud
- 2004: Bruno Le Floc'h for Trois Éclats blancs, Delcourt
- 2005: Gipi for Notes pour une histoire de guerre, Actes Sud
- 2006: Ludovic Debeurme for Lucille, Futuropolis
- 2007: Jul for Le guide du moutard: Pour survivre à 9 mois de grossesse, Glénat
- 2008 : Chloé Cruchaudet for Groenland Manhattan, éditions Delcourt.

2009-2016 no awards given

- 2017 : Emmanuel Guibert for Martha et Alan and life's work.
- 2018 : Jean Harambat for Opération Copperhead, éditions Dargaud.

== 2020s ==
- 2020: Gwen de Bonneval and Fabien Vehlmann for Le Dernier atlas
- 2021: Loo Hui Phang for Black-Out (Futuropolis)
