= Serge Huo-Chao-Si =

Contemporary artist and comic book creator

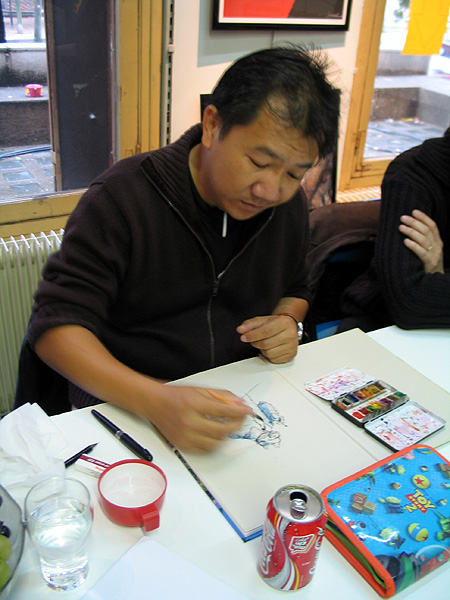
- Serge Huo-Chao-Si drawing, Librairie Nation, Paris
- Born: 3 November 1968 (age 58) Saint-Denis, Réunion
- Area: Cartoonist
- Awards: Prix de la critique (2004)

Serge Huo-Chao-Si (born 1968 in La Réunion) is a contemporary artist and comic book creator.

== Early life ==
Serge Huo-Chao-Si studied in Saint-Denis, Réunion and Lille, and graduated in mechanical engineering from high school on his native island.

Huo-Chao-Si was among the founders of Le Cri du Margouillat magazine, where he was one of the most active authors. As well as comics, he is also interested in contemporary art, painting, drawing, and photography, with many exhibitions of his work have been shown in Réunion and metropolitan France.

== Bibliography ==
=== Illustrations ===
- Votez Ubu colonial, text by Emmanuel Genvrin, éd. Grand Océan 1994 ISBN 2-9507688-8-1

=== Comics ===
With Appollo

- La Grippe coloniale, t1 : Le retour d'Ulysse, éd. Vents d'Ouest 2003 ISBN 2-7493-0096-7
- Dans les Hauts (collection), éd. Centre du monde 2001 ISBN 2-912013-11-9
- Cases en tôle, éd. Centre du Monde 1999 ISBN 2-912013-06-2
- La Guerre d'Izidine, Académie de la Réunion/Union européenne, collection "Floraisons", 2006

== Awards ==
La Grippe coloniale won the Prix de la critique from the Association des Critiques et des journalistes de Bande Dessinée in 2003.

== Bibliography ==
- Serge Huo-Chao-Si at Lambiek's Comiclopedia
- Serge Huo-Chao-Si at Bedetheque (in French)
