= Ariol (TV series) =

Television series

Ariol is an animated television series, based on the French comics of the same title. In France, it was broadcast on TF1, Télétoon+ and Piwi+. In Canada, it was broadcast on Unis (although it was never aired in English). Season 2 was released in 2017. Season 1 was composed of four-minute episodes. For season 2, the episodes were extended to being twelve-minutes long.

== Characters ==
Many of the characters are based on the equivalent in the comics:

- Ariol, a donkey, voiced by Sarah Delaby Rochette (season 1)
- Ramono, a pig, voiced by Paul Olinger (season 1)
- Mr. Blunt (French: Monsieur Le Blount), a dog who teaches, voiced by Gerard Thevenet (season 1)
- Papi Atole, voiced by Serge Pauthe (season 1)
- Petula, a cow, voiced by Lisa Debard (season 1)
- Mamie Asine, voiced by Line Wible (season 1)
- Mamie Annette, voiced by Marie-Line Permingeat Guinet (season 1)
- Bisbille, voiced by Janne-Alice Pitot (season 1)
- Tiburge, voiced by Aria Rolland (season 1)
- Avoine, voiced by Vincent Tessier (season 1)
- Chevalier Cheval, voiced by Jean-Pierre Skalka (season 1)
- Mule, voiced by Celine Roche (season 1)

== Episodes ==
Unis TV began broadcasting new episodes in 2020. TV guides did not actually describe each episodes' plot individually, only giving a generic description: "La vie quotidienne du heros eponyme, le petit ane bleu Ariol, et de son entourage proche".

- "Au vide-grenier" (8 September 2020)
- "La dent qui bouge" (9 September 2020)
- "Aquaplouf" (10 September 2020)
- "Attention travaux" (11 September 2020)
