= Exit Wounds (graphic novel) =

Graphic novel by Rutu Modan

- Author: Rutu Modan
- Illustrator: Rutu Modan
- Language: English
- Genre: Comics
- Publisher: Drawn & Quarterly
- Publication date: 2007
- Publication place: Canada
- Media type: Print, Hardcover
- Pages: 168
- ISBN: 1-897299-06-0

Exit Wounds is a graphic novel written and drawn by Rutu Modan about a search of a missing lover and a missing father in modern Tel Aviv, during the tense time of bombs attack in Israel.

== Plot summary ==
The book follows a search of a young woman, Numi, for her old lover, who disappeared just before a suicide bomb that left an unidentified body. Numi calls Koby, a cab-driver and the missing person's son, to help her in the search. Exit Wounds challenges the idea of the corrosive influence of the search for an ending.

== Publication history ==
The graphic novel, published in Hardcover on 2007 by Drawn & Quarterly, and in paperback in 2008. It was published in Hebrew on 2008 by Am-Oved with the name קרוב רחוק Karov Rahok "close-far". It won the 2008 Eisner Award for Best New Graphic Novel, and the 2008 "Essentials of Angoulême".

== See also ==
- Alternative comics
