= Samantha oups! =

French sketch comedy series

- Title card
- Also known as: Samantha (in Canada)
- Genre: Sketch comedy
- Created by: David Strajmayster
- Starring: David Strajmayster; Guillaume Carcaud
- Country of origin: France
- Original language: French
- No. of seasons: 4
- No. of episodes: 314 (list of episodes)

Production
- Executive producer: Xavier Pujade-Lauraine
- Producers: Bruno Piney; Gérard Pautonnier; Xavier Pujade-Lauraine
- Running time: 5 minutes each
- Production companies: Big Nose; France 2

Original release
- Network: France 2
- Release: September 11, 2004 – June 30, 2007

Samantha oups! is a French sketch comedy series that was broadcast on France 2 from 2004 to 2007.

The series deals with the life of a blonde young woman, Samantha Lo, and her brunette friend, Chantal Matieu. As part of the comedic nature of the series, the roles are played by men, with David Strajmayster (credited as "Doudi") playing Samantha, and Guillaume Carcaud ("Pepess") starring as Chantal; Carcaud also plays various minor male and female roles in the show.

== Format ==
Chantal (Guillaume Carcaud, left) and Samantha (David Strajmayster, right)

The series is presented in a "shortcom" (short sitcom) format, with each episode generally running for approximately 5 minutes each.

Early episodes in the series featured Samantha and Chantal attempting various activities or careers, with varying, comedic results; these most-often feature Samantha in many aspects of a given subject or career—for example, in an episode focused on a supermarket, Samantha is portrayed as a shopper, a stockperson and a cashier; another example, which featured Samantha in court, portrayed her as a judge, a stenographer, an attorney, a plaintiff, a defendant and a spectator. Many of these episodes were taped in and around Paris, with some episodes shot on location in other parts of France. The series also featured a 12-part episode, which featured Samantha and Chantal on vacation in Marrakesh, Morocco, over Christmas and Réveillon. Samantha also has a crush on notable television host Jean-Luc Delarue; in one episode, Samantha and Chantal break into a TV studio in an attempt to meet Delarue face-to-face.

The show's final season (2006–2007) take place in Samantha's cottage ("gîte"), which her aunt, "Grande Tata Lo", has owned. Following the introduction of the gîte format, recurring characters were added, which bend towards the absurd—featured characters, all played by other actors, include Simon, the troubled writer; Annabelle, the awkward businesswoman; Baul, the postman who reads other people's mail; hunters Gontrand and Ademar; and Daniel, a professor. The gîte episodes also included special guests, either playing themselves or other characters—notable guests included Stéphane Bern, Olivier Minne and Jean-Marc Morandini.

== Production ==
The series was in production from 2004 to 2007; production ended when Strajmayster announced that a film based on the series is being produced. However, since the close of production of the series, no film was made, and Strajmayster and Carcaud have since moved on to other series.

The series was produced with funding from the CNC.

== Broadcast ==
The series was first broadcast on France 2 from 2004 to 2007 in two-episode blocks weekdays at 7:50PM, before France 2's evening 8PM newscast, Journal de 20 heures; the series is still broadcast in repeats on France 4, Game One and Canal J, often seen in three-episode blocks.

The series also was seen in Belgium on Club RTL, and in Canada on Vrak.TV (where it is broadcast as Samantha).

Franco-Belgian broadcaster RTBF holds Region 2 DVD distribution rights in Belgium. In Canada (Region 1), DVD releases are distributed through DEP Distribution.

== Episodes ==
=== Season 1 (2004–2005) ===
1. Samantha au marché (Samantha at the market)
2. Samantha au supermarché (Samantha at the supermarket)
3. Samantha sur le banc (Samantha on the bench)
4. Samantha à la gym (Samantha at the gym)
5. Samantha à la gym : le retour (Samantha at the gym: the return)
6. Samantha à la maison (Samantha at home)
7. Samantha au jardin (Samantha in the garden)
8. Samantha à la gym (3e partie) (Samantha at the gym, part 3)
9. Samantha fête Halloween (Samantha's Halloween party)
10. Samantha se prête aux jeux (Samantha is ready to play)
11. Samantha au standard (Samantha at the switchboard)
12. Samantha au bureau (Samantha in the office)
13. Samantha dans l'ascenseur (Samantha on the elevator)
14. Samantha fait du baby sitting (Samantha babysits)
15. Samantha prépare Noël (Samantha gets ready for Christmas)
16. Samantha dîne aux chandelles (Samantha dines by candlelight)
17. Samantha au café (Samantha at the café)
18. Les petites rencontres de Samantha (Samantha's little meetings)
19. Samantha est malade (Samantha is sick)
20. Samantha est encore malade (Samantha is still sick)
21. Samantha dans la rue (Samantha on the street)
22. Samantha judoka (Samantha the judoka)
23. Samantha à l'institut de beauté (Samantha at beauty school)
24. Samantha au ski (1re partie) (Samantha skis, part 1)
25. Samantha au ski (2e partie) (Samantha skis, part 2)
26. Samantha au ski (3e partie) (Samantha skis, part 3)
27. Samantha totalement à la rue (Samantha totally on the street)
28. Samantha dans tous ses états (Samantha in every mood)
29. Samantha fait sa cuisine (Samantha makes dinner)
30. Samantha fait toujours sa cuisine (Samantha always makes dinner)

=== Season 2 (2005–2006) ===
1. Samantha fait son shopping (Samantha goes shopping)
2. Samantha continue son shopping (Samantha still shopping)
3. Samantha à la fête foraine (Samantha at the fair)
4. Samantha de retour à la fête foraine (Samantha returns to the fair)
5. Samantha au salon de coiffure (Samantha at the hair salon)
6. Samantha se recoiffe au salon de coiffure (Samantha gets restyled at the hair salon)
7. Samantha se fait un plateau télé (Samantha uses a TV tray)
8. Samantha fait du camping (Samantha goes camping)
9. Samantha dans sa salle de bain (Samantha in the bathroom)
10. Samantha et les joies du camping (Samantha and the joy of camping)
11. Samantha à la ferme, 1re partie (Samantha at the farm, part 1)
12. Samantha à la ferme, 2e partie (Samantha at the farm, part 2)
13. Samantha derrière le bar (1re partie) (Samantha the bartender, part 1)
14. Samantha derrière le bar (2e partie) (Samantha the bartender, part 2)
15. Samantha à l'auto-école (Samantha at driving school)
16. Samantha passe son permis (Samantha gets her driver's license)
17. Samantha jardine (Samantha is gardening)
18. Samantha passe des castings (Samantha passes the audition)
19. Samantha fait du théâtre (Samantha does theater)
20. Samantha fait de l'athlétisme (Samantha the athlete)
21. Samantha fait de l'athlétisme 2e partie (Samantha the athlete, part 2)
22. Samantha fait du porte à porte (Samantha goes from door to door)
23. Samantha fait son grand ménage (Samantha does spring cleaning)
24. Samantha prépare l'anniversaire de Chantal (1re partie) (Samantha gets ready for Chantal's birthday, part 1)
25. Samantha prépare l'anniversaire de Chantal (2e partie) (Samantha gets ready for Chantal's birthday, part 2)
26. Samantha au grand magasin (1re partie) (Samantha at the department store, part 1)
27. Samantha au grand magasin (2e partie) (Samantha at the department store, part 2)
28. Samantha infirmière (1re partie) (Nurse Samantha, part 1)
29. Samantha infirmière (2e partie) (Nurse Samantha, part 1)
30. Samantha passagère (Samantha the passenger)
31. Samantha hôtesse de l'air (Samantha the stewardess)
32. Samantha chez le dentiste (1re partie) (Samantha at the dentist office, part 1)
33. Samantha chez le dentiste (2e partie) (Samantha at the dentist office, part 2)
34. Samantha en discothèque (1re partie) (Samantha at the disco, part 1)
35. Samantha en discothèque (2e partie) (Samantha at the disco, part 2)
36. Samantha et Jean-Luc Delarue (acte 1) (Samantha and Jean-Luc Delarue, act 1)^{1}
37. Samantha et Jean-Luc Delarue (acte 2) (Samantha and Jean-Luc Delarue, act 2)^{1}

^{1} "Samantha et Jean-Luc Delarue" was initially released as a bonus feature on DVD before broadcast.

==== Samantha en vacances à Marrakech (Samantha on vacation at Marrakesh) ====
1. Samantha en vacances à Marrakech (1re partie)
2. Samantha en vacances à Marrakech (2e partie)
3. Samantha en vacances à Marrakech (3e partie)
4. Samantha en vacances à Marrakech (4e partie)
5. Samantha en vacances à Marrakech (5e partie)
6. Samantha en vacances à Marrakech (6e partie) – Noël (Christmas)
7. Samantha en vacances à Marrakech (7e partie)
8. Samantha en vacances à Marrakech (8e partie)
9. Samantha en vacances à Marrakech (9e partie)
10. Samantha en vacances à Marrakech (10e partie)
11. Samantha en vacances à Marrakech (11e partie)
12. Samantha en vacances à Marrakech (12e partie) – Réveillon

=== Season 3 (2006) ===
1. Samantha se prête au jeu (1re partie) (Samantha is ready to play, part 1)
2. Samantha se prête au jeu (2e partie) (Samantha is ready to play, part 2)
3. Samantha au commissariat (1re partie) (Samantha at the police station, part 1)
4. Samantha au commissariat (2e partie) (Samantha at the police station, part 2)
5. Samantha animatrice en grande surface (1re partie) (Samantha, supermarket manager, part 1)
6. Samantha animatrice en grande surface (2e partie) (Samantha, supermarket manager, part 2)
7. Samantha fait un régime (1re partie) (Samantha goes on a diet, part 1)
8. Samantha fait un régime (2e partie) (Samantha goes on a diet, part 2)
9. Samantha contractuelle (Samantha the traffic cop)
10. Samantha chauffeur de taxi (1re partie) (Samantha the cabbie, part 1)
11. Samantha chauffeur de taxi (2e partie) (Samantha the cabbie, part 2)
12. Samantha prépare le concours de miss (1re partie) (Samantha gets ready for the beauty pageant, part 1)
13. Samantha prépare le concours de miss (2e partie) (Samantha gets ready for the beauty pageant, part 2)
14. Samantha organise un barbecue (1re partie) (Samantha organises a barbecue, part 1)
15. Samantha organise un barbecue (2e partie) (Samantha organises a barbecue, part 2)
16. Samantha prend le train (1re partie) (Samantha takes the train, part 1)
17. Samantha prend le train (2e partie) (Samantha takes the train, part 2)
18. Samantha fait l'armée (1re partie) (Samantha joins the army, part 1)
19. Samantha fait l'armée (2e partie) (Samantha joins the army, part 2)
20. Samantha à la pêche (1re partie) (Samantha goes fishing, part 1)
21. Samantha à la pêche (2e partie) (Samantha goes fishing, part 2)
22. Samantha au tribunal (1re partie) (Samantha goes to court, part 1)
23. Samantha au tribunal (2e partie) (Samantha goes to court, part 2)
24. Samantha dans tous ses états (2e partie) (Samantha in every mood, part 2)
25. Samantha dans tous ses états (3e partie) (Samantha in every mood, part 3)

=== Season 4: Le Gîte (2006–2007) ===
1. Bienvenue à le Gîte (Welcome to the cottage)
2. L'installation (Moving in)
3. Bonne nuit les filles (Goodnight ladies)
4. Le Facteur (The postman)
5. Premier réveil (First awakening)
6. L'arrivée d'Annabelle (Annabelle's arrival)
7. Les petits conseils d'Annabelle (Annabelle's little advice)
8. Le dîner du Maire (The mayor's dinner)
9. Casting de cuisinières (Trying out the stoves)
10. L'équitation (Horse riding)
11. L'arrivée de Simon (Simon's arrival)
12. Au service de Simon (Simon's service)
13. Les clients anglais 1 (English clients 1)
14. Les clients anglais 2 (English clients 2)
15. La journée de Simon (Simon's day)
16. Les chasseurs (The hunters)
17. Partie de chasse (Hunting party)
18. Jour de pluie (Rainy day)
19. La brocante 1 (The flea market 1)
20. La brocante 2 (The flea market 2)
21. La brocante 3 (The flea market 3)
22. Préparation de mariage (Getting ready for a wedding)
23. A la recherche des clés (Finding the keys)
24. Reportage au Gîte (Cottage report)
25. Le football (Football); (Soccer)
26. Le lavoir (The wash)
27. Les petits "plus" du Gîte (The cottage's little "plusses")
28. Les cuisinières 1 (The stoves 1)
29. Les cuisinières 2 (The stoves 2)
30. Consignes de sécurité 1 (Security instructions 1)
31. Une Star au Gîte (A star of the cottage)
32. Le spectacle (The spectacle)
33. Consignes de sécurité 2 (Security instructions 2)
34. Bonne fête le Gîte 1 (Happy birthday, cottage 1)
35. Bonne fête le Gîte 2 (Happy birthday, cottage 2)
36. Journée sportive (Sports day)
37. Un mafieux au Gîte 1 (A mafioso at the cottage 1)
38. Un mafieux au Gîte 2 (A mafioso at the cottage 2)
39. Un mafieux au Gîte 3 (A mafioso at the cottage 3)
40. JM Morandini au Gîte (JM Morandini at the cottage)
41. La nouvelle femme de ménage (A new maid)
42. Noël enchanté 2 (Enchanted Christmas 2)
43. Champagne ! (Champagne!)
44. Réveillon et cotillons (Réveillon and party favors)
45. Week-end de chasse 1 (Hunting weekend 1)
46. Coup de foudre avec Giovanni 1 (Love at first sight with Giovanni 1)
47. Coup de foudre avec Giovanni 2 (Love at first sight with Giovanni 2)
48. Coup de foudre avec Giovanni 3 (Love at first sight with Giovanni 3)
49. Baby-sitting au Gîte 1 (Baby sitting at the cottage 1)
50. Rock'n'roll attitude (Rock'n'roll attitude)
51. Jeu de pistes 1 (Treasure hunt 1)
52. Jeu de pistes 2 (Treasure hunt 2)
53. Bon départ (Head start)
54. L’équitation 2 (Horse riding 2)
55. Les petits déjeuners (Breakfasts)
56. Soyons Zen (Letting Zen)
57. Bonjour-Bonsoir (Good morning - Good night)
58. Découverte de la forêt (Discovering the forest)
59. L'anniversaire de Simon l'écrivain (Simon the writer's birthday)
60. Grève générale (General strike)
61. Service compris (Service included)
62. L'inspecteur du Gîte (Cottage inspector)
63. Les Zaristos (The Zaristos)
64. Heureux Zévènement (Happy "Zevent")
65. Halloween (Halloween)
66. Baul est en grève (Baul is on strike)
67. Amour champêtre (Love in the country)
68. Dans le salon (In the living room)
69. Journée télé (TV day)
70. Dîner chasseurs (Hunters' dinner)
71. Les inédits du samedi 1 (Saturday's novels 1)
72. Le départ d'Annabelle (Annabelle leaves)
73. Intérim 1 (Interim 1)
74. Intérim 2 (Interim 2)
75. Un dimanche au Gîte (A Sunday at the cottage)
76. Samantha à la réception 1 (Samantha at the reception 1)
77. Les inédits du samedi 2 (Saturday's novels 2)
78. La crève au Gîte (The cottage springs a leak)
79. Visite médicale (Medical visit)
80. Journée télé 2 (TV day 2)
81. Les inédits du samedi 3 (Saturday's novels 3)
82. Kermesse 1 (The fair 1)
83. Kermesse 2 (The fair 2)
84. Samantha à la réception 2 (Samantha at the reception 2)
85. Les inédits du samedi 4 (Saturday's novels 4)
86. Demain c'est Noël (Christmas is tomorrow)
87. Noël enchanté 1 (Enchanted Christmas 1)
88. Bonne année (Happy New Year)
89. Sam refait la déco 1 (Sam redecorates 1)
90. Sam refait la déco 2 (Sam redecorates 2)
91. Week-end de chasse 2 (Hunting weekend 2)
92. Week-end de chasse 3 (Hunting weekend 3)
93. Les inédits du samedi 5 (Saturday's novels 5)
94. Baby-sitting au Gîte 2 (Baby sitting at the cottage 2)
95. Départ en vacances 1 (Leaving on vacation 1)
96. Départ en vacances 2 (Leaving on vacation 2)
97. Cambriolage au Gîte 1 (Burglary at the cottage 1)
98. Cambriolage au Gîte 2 (Burglary at the cottage 2)
99. Simon et son éditeur (Simon and the publisher)
100. Les inédits du samedi 6 (Saturday's novels 6)
101. Retour de vacances 1 (Return from vacation 1)
102. Retour de vacances 2 (Return from vacation 2)
103. Sam prépare le bac 1 (Sam installs the tub 1)
104. Sam prépare le bac 2 (Sam installs the tub 2)
105. Insomnie au Gîte (Cottage insomnia)
106. Spiritisme 1 (Spiritism 1)
107. Spiritisme 2 (Spiritism 2)
108. Trip écolo 1 (Ecological trip 1)
109. Trip écolo 2 (Ecological trip 2)
110. Les inédits du samedi 7 (Saturday's novels 7)
111. Le bal des pompiers (The firemen's ball)
112. L'instinct maternel (Maternal instinct)
113. Un VRP au Gîte (A travelling salesman at the cottage)
114. Les inédits du samedi 8 (Saturday's novels 8)
115. Anniversaire de rencontre 1 (Anniversary meeting 1)
116. Anniversaire de rencontre 2 (Anniversary meeting 1)
117. Visite du curé (The priest's visit)
118. L'ennemi public n°1 (Public Enemy #1)
119. Les inédits du samedi 9 (Saturday's novels 9)
120. Tournage au Gîte 1 (Shooting at the cottage 1)
121. Tournage au Gîte 2 (Shooting at the cottage 2)
122. Soirée tripot 1 (Casino night 1)
123. Soirée tripot 2 (Casino night 2)
124. Défilé au Gîte 1 (Cottage parade 1)
125. Défilé au Gîte 2 (Cottage parade 2)
126. Les nonnes (The nuns)
127. La panne (The breakdown)
128. Les inédits du samedi 10 (Saturday's novels 10)
129. Le retour d'Annabelle 1 (Return of Annabelle 1)
130. Le retour d'Annabelle 2 (Return of Annabelle 2)
131. Samantha loue le Gîte 1 (Samantha rents out the cottage 1)
132. Samantha loue le Gîte 2 (Samantha rents out the cottage 2)
133. Les inédits du samedi 11 (Saturday's novels 11)
134. Ado-sitting 1 (Teen sitting 1)
135. Ado-sitting 2 (Teen sitting 2)
136. Ado-sitting 3 (Teen sitting 3)
137. Peur sur le Gîte (Fear at the cottage)
138. Les inédits du samedi 12 (Saturday's novels 12)
139. Un huissier au Gîte 1 (The cottage doorkeeper 1)
140. Un huissier au Gîte 2 (The cottage doorkeeper 2)
141. Le grand tirage (The big drawing)
142. Ticket gagnant (Winning ticket)
143. Super cagnotte (Big kitty)
144. L'amoureux d'Annabelle 1 (Annabelle's lover 1)
145. L'amoureux d'Annabelle 2 (Annabelle's lover 2)
146. L'amoureux d'Annabelle 3 (Annabelle's lover 3)
147. Jeux au Gîte 1 (Cottage games 1)
148. Les inédits du samedi 13 (Saturday's novels 13)
149. Jeux au Gîte 2 (Cottage games 2)
150. Le dragueur 1 (The flirt 1)
151. Le dragueur 2 (The flirt 2)
152. Chasse au trésor 1 (Treasure hunt 1)
153. Chasse au trésor 2 (Treasure hunt 2)
154. Les inédits du samedi 14 (Saturday's novels 14)
155. Le marché 1 (The market 1)
156. Le marché 2 (The market 2)
157. Samantha prépare l'été (Samantha gets ready for summer)
158. Coup de blues au Gîte 1 (The cottage blues 1)
159. Coup de blues au Gîte 2 (The cottage blues 2)
160. L'archéologue (The archaeologist)
161. Le psy (The psychiatrist)
162. Réparation au Gîte (Cottage repairs)
163. L'art au Gîte 1 (Cottage art 1)
164. L'art au Gîte 2 (Cottage art 2)
165. Les inédits du samedi 15 (Saturday's novels 15)
166. Souvenirs souvenirs 1 (Memories, memories 1)
167. Souvenirs souvenirs 2 (Memories, memories 2)
168. Management à l'américaine (American management)
169. A bicyclette 1 (On the bicycle 1)
170. A bicyclette 2 (On the bicycle 2)
171. Les inédits du samedi 16 (Saturday's novels 16)
172. Samantha a bon cœur 1 (Kind-hearted Samantha 1)
173. Samantha a bon cœur 2 (Kind-hearted Samantha 2)
174. Sécurité au Gîte (Cottage security)
175. Coup de main au garage 1 (A garage's helping hand 1)
176. Coup de main au garage 2 (A garage's helping hand 2)
177. Les inédits du samedi 17 (Saturday's novels 17)
178. Le retour de Jean-Michel (Jean-Michael returns)
179. Jean-Michel défie Adémar (Jean-Michael challenges Adémar)
180. Sacré Jean-Michel ! (Mighty Jean-Michael!)
181. Chantal a disparu 1 (Chantal is lost 1)
182. Chantal a disparu 2 (Chantal is lost 2)
183. Chantal a disparu 3 (Chantal is lost 3)
184. Olivier Minne débarque au Gîte (Olivier Minne comes to the cottage)
185. Week-end scouts 1 (Weekend scouts 1)
186. Week-end scouts 2 (Weekend scouts 2)
187. Week-end scouts 3 (Weekend scouts 3)
188. Réquisition au Gîte (Commandeering the cottage)
189. Stéphane Bern au Gîte (Stéphane Bern at the cottage)
190. Samantha prépare le 14 juillet (Samantha gets ready for Bastille Day)
191. Une virée en bus 1 (Bus trip 1)
192. Visite au château (Visiting a château)
193. Pique-nique entre amis 1 (Picnicking with friends 1)
194. Une virée en bus 2 (Bus trip 2)
195. Pique-nique entre amis 2 (Picnicking with friends 2)
196. Une virée en bus 3 (Bus trip 2)
197. Olympiades au Gîte 1 (Cottage Olympics 1)
198. Olympiades au Gîte 2 (Cottage Olympics 2)
199. Chantal rencontre ses beaux-parents 1 (Chantal meets her in-laws 1)
200. Chantal rencontre ses beaux-parents 2 (Chantal meets her in-laws 2)
201. Sam fait son book (Sam writes her book)
202. Chantal fait son book (Chantal writes her book)
203. L'ado rebelle 1 (Rebellious teen 1)
204. L'ado rebelle 2 (Rebellious teen 2)
205. L'ado rebelle 3 (Rebellious teen 3)
206. Cousin la mouise 1 (Country cousin 1)
207. Cousin la mouise 2 (Country cousin 2)
208. Les inédits du samedi 18 (Saturday's novels 18)
209. Les inédits du samedi 19 (Saturday's novels 19)
210. Les inédits du samedi 20 (Saturday's novels 20)
211. Les inédits du samedi 21 (Saturday's novels 21)

== Cast ==
- David Strajmayster ("Doudi"): Samantha Lo
- Guillaume Carcaud ("Pepess"): Chantal Matieu; miscellaneous characters

=== Supporting cast ===
Added after the introduction of the "gîte" format

- Vincent Jaspard: Le Maire (The Mayor)
- Julien Cafaro: Baul
- Marie-Laure Descoureaux: Annabelle Delarinatonière
- Philippe Spiteri: Simon Quewa
- Philippe Vieux: Gontrand
- Eric Bougnon: Adémar
- Pierre-Yves le Louarn: Daniel
- Solange Milhaud: Consuella
- Lee Delong: Aniesca

== Accolades ==
Year	Awards	Category	Recipient	Result
2007	Globes de Cristal Award	Best TV Movie / TV Series	David Strajmayster	Nominated
