= Miriam Katin =

Hungarian-born American graphic novelist and graphic artist

- Born: 1942 (age 83–84) Budapest, Hungary
- Area: Cartoonist
- Notable works: We Are on Our Own; Letting It Go
- Awards: Inkpot Award; Prix de la critique

Miriam Katin (born 1942) is a Hungarian-born American graphic novelist and graphic artist. She worked in animation from 1981 to 2000 in Israel and the United States. She has written two autobiographical graphic novels, We Are on Our Own (2006) and Letting It Go (2013). She has won an Inkpot Award and the Prix de la critique.

== Biography ==
Katin was born in 1942, in wartime Budapest. While her father served in the Hungarian army, she and her mother escaped the Nazi occupation of Hungary by faking their own deaths and acquiring false identification documents. In 1957, Katin and her family settled in Israel. There she joined a graphic arts studio in Tel Aviv as an apprentice, and in 1960 she joined the Israel Defense Forces for two years as a graphic artist. In 1963 Katin moved to New York and married Geoffrey Katin a music educator. They have two sons, Aaron a musician and Ilan an artist. In 1981 the family moved to (kibbutz)|Ein Gedi, where she worked as a background designer for Ein Gedi Animation. In 1990 the Katins returned to New York where she continued working in background design for the Walt Disney Animation Studios, Nickelodeon Animation Studio and MTV Animation until 2000. At MTV, she worked on Daria and Beavis and Butt-Head.

Katin started creating comics in the 2000s. She said, "I discovered comics for myself at age 63." Inspired by Art Spiegelman's graphic novel Maus, a Holocaust memoir, she started to work on her first graphic novel, about her and her mother's experiences during World War II. The finished product, titled We Are on Our Own, was published by Drawn & Quarterly in 2006. It is drawn in black-and-white pencil and incorporates some of Katin's family photos. She created her second graphic novel, Letting It Go, published in 2013, in response to her "enormous need to deal with my trauma of my son's decision to move to Berlin". Letting It Go is also autobiographical, depicting her initial reaction to her son's move to Berlin, and her own visit to Germany, including Berlin's Memorial to the Murdered Jews of Europe. In contrast to her first novel, it is drawn in colored crayons.

Katin lives in Washington Heights in Manhattan with her husband. She considers herself American rather than Hungarian or Israeli.

== Awards ==
Katin won a 2007 Inkpot Award. In 2006, We Are on Our Own was nominated for an Eisner Award and an Ignatz Award for Outstanding Story. In 2013, Letting It Go received an Ignatz Award nomination for Outstanding Artist. The French translation of We Are on Our Own won the 2008 Prix de la critique. Katin's work has been featured in the 2007 and 2014 volumes of The Best American Comics.
