= Chloé Cruchaudet =

French screenwriter

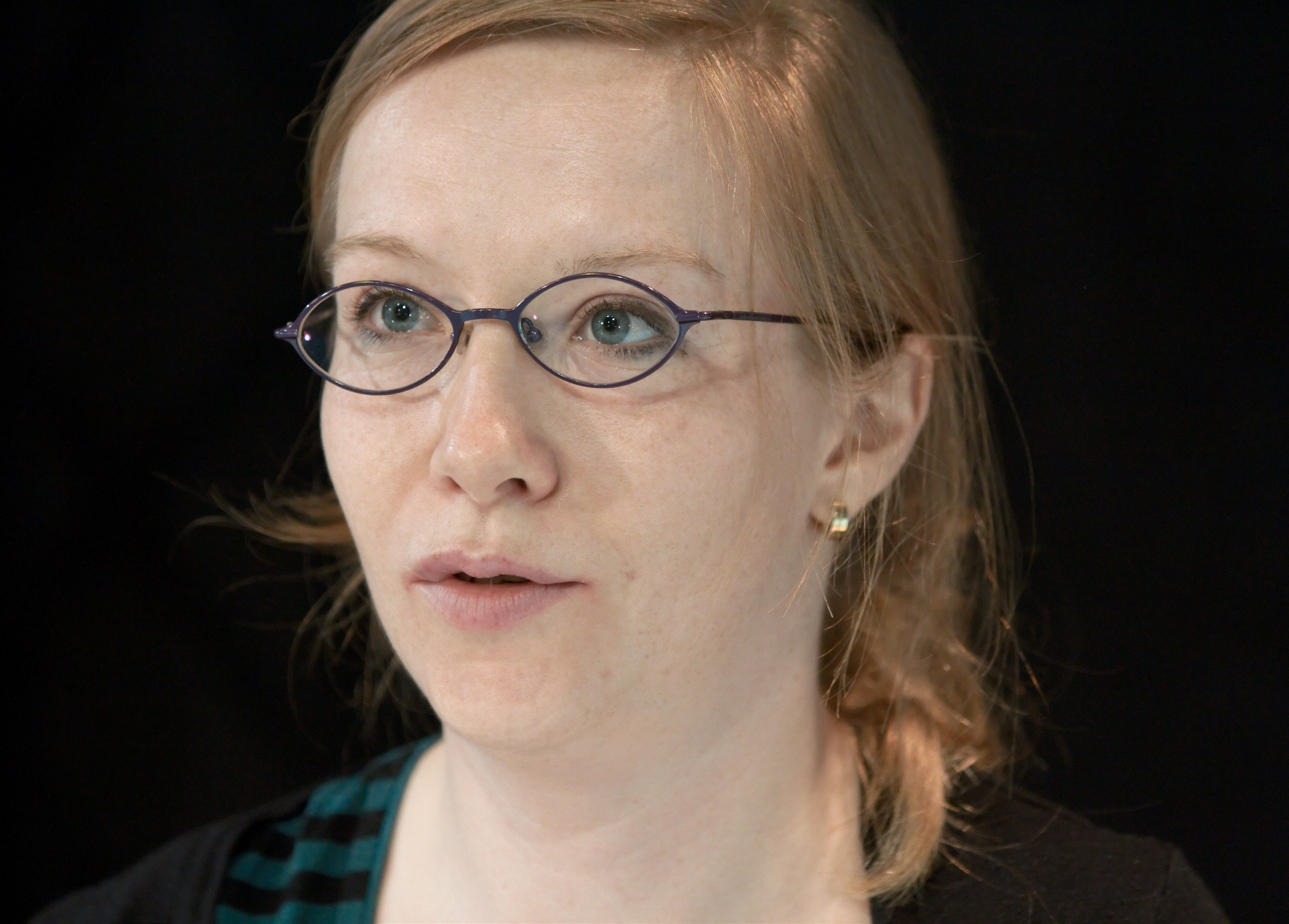
- Chloé Cruchaudet at the Rencontres du neuvième art d'Aix-en-Provence in 2010.
- Born: 2 November 1976 (age 49)
- Occupations: comic book illustrator, author and colorist

Chloé Cruchaudet (born 2 November 1976 in Lyon, France) is a French comic book illustrator, author and colorist.

== Early life ==
Chloé Cruchaudet studied at the Émile-Cohl School in Lyon and then at the Gobelins School in Paris, where she studied animation.

== Career ==
She committed to the field at the beginning of her career. She worked on series and animated films, notably Ernest and Celestine and Have you ever seen..., while developing personal projects.

In 2006, she entered the world of comics. She participated in the collective album Les Enfants Sauvés, released by Delcourt in November 2008. In 2009, she launched the Ida series, which details in three volumes the adventures of a thirty-year-old hypochondriac and authoritarian spinster who discovers a passion for travel. At the same time, she participated in the project Les Autres Gens brings together multiple artists around scriptwriter Thomas Cadène, who was the initiator of this comic book project.

In February 2016, Chloé refused her nomination in the Order of Arts and Letters, as did three other comic book authors.

In 2017 she began teaching at Émile Cohl school in Lyon.

== Mauvais genre ==
In September 2013, she released Mauvais genre based on the essay "La Garçonne et l'Assassin" by Fabrice Virgili and Danièle Voldman. The book was well received by critics and earned awards:

- Landerneau BD (2013)
- Coup de cœur at Quai des Bulles festival
- Critics' Award of the Association of Comic Book Critics and Journalists,
- Cultura Audience Award at the Angoulême International Comics Festival (2014)

== Recognition ==
- René Goscinny prize (2008)

== Bibliography ==
- La Fête foraine de Gus, Balivernes éditions, 2006 ISBN 978-2-35067-002-7
- Joséphine Baker, Nocturne, coll. « BD Chanson », 2006
- Groenland Manhattan, Delcourt, 2008 ISBN 978-2-7560-0967-4
- « Gargantua versus Alice », in Rendez-vous, Akileos, 2008
- Participation in Enfants sauvés (dessin), avec Philippe Thirault (scénario), Delcourt, 2008
- « Mon chat à moi 5 », in Mon chat à moi, Delcourt, 2008
- Ida, Delcourt :
1. Grandeur et Humiliation, 2009 ISBN 978-2-7560-1539-2
2. Candeur et Abomination, 2011 ISBN 978-2-7560-2200-0
3. Stupeur et Révélation, 2013 ISBN 978-2-7560-2810-1
- Participation in Autres Gens, volumes 2 and 3 (drawing), with Thomas Cadène (scenario), Dupuis, 2011
- Mauvais Genre, Delcourt, 2013 ISBN 978-2-7560-3971-8
- La Poudre d'escampette, Delcourt, 2015
- L'Herbier sauvage, Soleil Productions, 2016
- La Belle et la Bête, Gallimard jeunesse, 2018
- La croisade des innocents, Soleil, coll. Noctambule, 2018 ISBN 9782302071278
- Les belles personnes, Soleil, coll. Noctambule, 2020 ISBN 9782302081765
- Céleste : « Bien sûr, monsieur Proust. » - Première partie, Éditions Soleil, 2022
