= Cyril Pedrosa =

French comic book artist, colorist, and writer

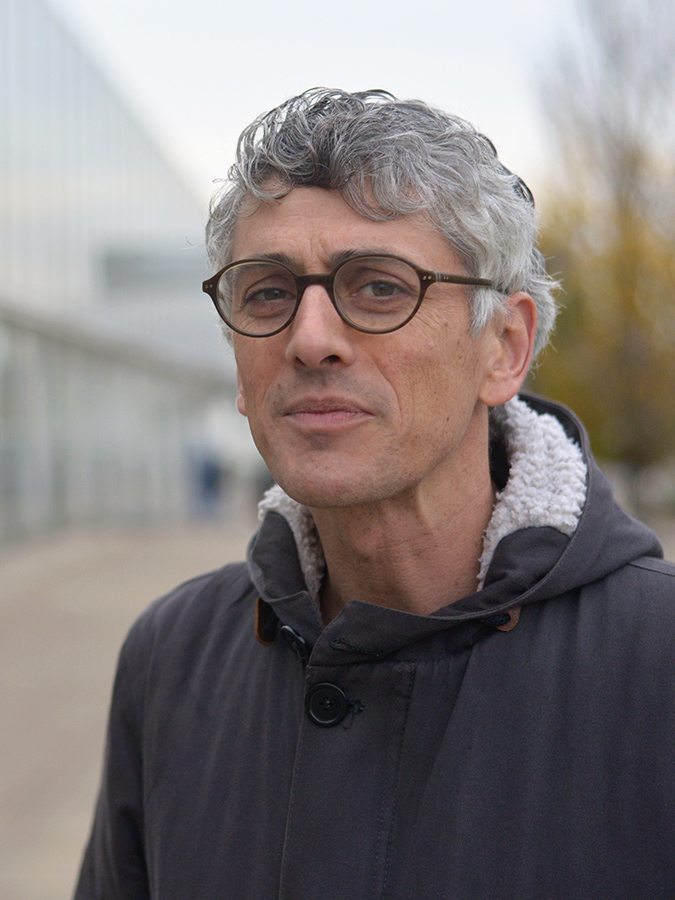
- Pedrosa in 2015
- Born: 22 November 1972 (age 53); Poitiers, France
- Education: Gobelins, l'École de l'image
- Occupations: Comics artist, animator
- Notable work: Three Shadows; Portugal
- Awards: Angoulême International Comics Festival (2008, 2012)

Signature
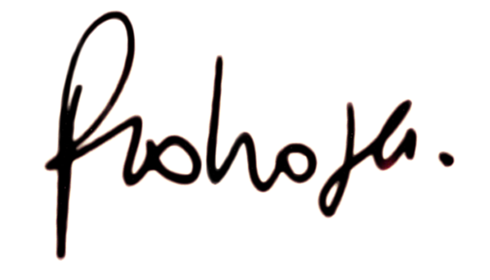

Cyril Pedrosa (born 22 November 1972) is a French comic book artist, colorist, and writer.

== Biography ==
=== Early life ===
Pedrosa was born in Poitiers to a family of Portuguese descent; his grandfather immigrated to France in the 1930s. He wanted to become a drawing artist since his adolescence, studying animation at Gobelins school, then working from 1996 to 1998 at Walt Disney Animation France, as an inbetweener in The Hunchback of Notre Dame and as assistant animator in Hercules.

=== Career ===
After meeting with David Chauvel, Pedrosa debuted into comics in 1998 with Ring Circus, for which he did art and coloring. A second title followed, Les Aventures spatio-temporelles de Shaolin Moussaka.

In 2006, Pedrosa created his first solo work, the one-shot Les Cœurs solitaires (Hearts at Sea), followed by a second one, Trois ombres (Three Shadows) in 2007. The album won the Angoulême International Comics Festival Essentials award in 2008 and the National Cartoonists Society Division Award in 2009.

He collaborated with the fanzine Le Goinfre and participated, with Cassinelli and Holbé, of the webcomic Cadavres Exquisis from 2004 to 2007. From 2008 to 2009, Pedrosa drew Autobio for Fluide Glacial, a fictionalized ecological-themed autobiography. The comic won the Prix Tournesol (Sunflower Award) in 2009, given by The Greens.

In 2012 he published the semi-autobiographical graphic novel Portugal, about a cartoonist exploring his family roots.

In 2013, he founded, alongside Gwen de Bonneval, Hervé Tanquerelle, Brüno and Fabien Vehlmann, the digital comics magazine Professeur Cyclope.

In 2018 he started the political fantasy graphic novel series The Golden Age (L'Âge d'Or), written by Roxanne Moreil.

He teamed up with Loïc Sécheresse to publish Carnets de manifs. Portraits d'une France en marche (Protest Notebooks: Portraits of a France on the Move) in January 2021, which focuses on the Yellow Vests movement.

In 2024 he collaborated with Voyage à Nantes in the project L'Évasion, a retelling of the story of the Wallace fountains, protagonized by their caryatids.

In 2026 Pedrosa collaborated with the Japanese manga artist Taiyō Matsumoto, drawing the album Nambanjin,about the arrival of the first Portuguese explorers in Tanegashima. The first part, drawn by Pedrosa, is read in the Western order, left-to-right; the second part, drawn by Matsumoto, is read like ala manga, right-to-left. The two stories meet halfway.

== Works published ==
- Ring Circus series (written by David Chauvel)
  - 1998 – Les Pantres
  - 2000 – Les Innocents
  - 2002 – Les Amants
  - 2004 – Les Révoltés
- Les Aventures spatio-temporelles de Shaolin Moussaka series (written by David Chauvel, colors by Christophe Araldi)
  - 2004 – …À Holy Hole
  - 2005 – Contre le grand Poukrass !!
  - 2006 – À Mollywood !!
- 2006 – Hearts at Sea (Les Cœurs solitaires)
- 2007 – Three Shadows (Trois Ombres)
  - Paroles sans papiers
    - Brigade fantôme (written by David Chauvel)
- 2008 – First Time (Premières fois

– participation in anthology org. by Sibylline, with the story "Soumission")

- 2009 – Autobio
- 2011 – Portugal
- 2015 – Equinoxes (Les équinoxes)
- 2017 – Serum (writer; art by Nicolas Gaignard)
- 2018 – The Golden Age (L' Âge d'Or, written by Roxanne Moreil)
- 2021 - Carnets de manifs. Portraits d'une France en marche, with Loïc Sécheresse.
- 2024 - Journal d'une bataille
- 2026 - Nanbanjin (with Taiyō Matsumoto)

== Awards ==
- 2008 : Angoulême International Comic2ithstival Essentials award, for Trois Ombres
- 2009 : Prix Tournesol for Autobio, t. 1
  - National Cartoonists Society Division Awards, for Three Shadows
- 2011 : Prix Le Point de la BD, for Portugal (Dupuis).
  - Prix Sheriff d'or de la librairie Esprit BD for Portugal
  - Prix Bédélys Monde for Portugal
- 2012 : Prix des Libraires de Bande Dessinée for Portugal
  - Angoulême International Comics Festival Prize Awarded by the Audience for Portugal
  - Gran Guinigi Award for Best Artist at the Lucca Comics & Games Festival (shared with Fabio Civitelli).
- 2018: Prix Landerneau for L' Âge d'Or.
- 2019: Prix BD FNAC/France Inter for L' Âge D'Or.
