= Émile Bravo =

French comics artist

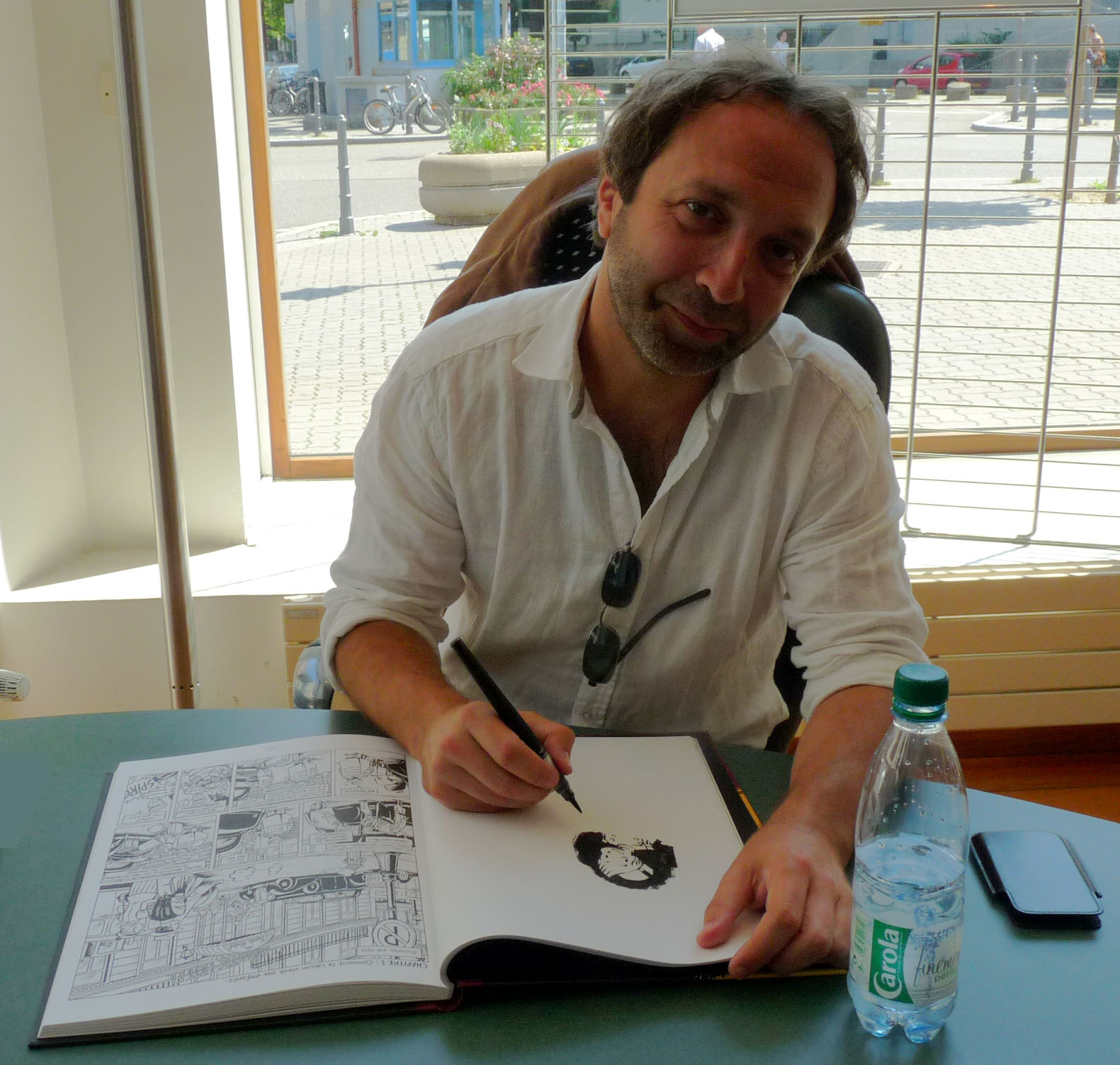
Émile Bravo drawing Spirou at a comics festival in Strasbourg in 2009

Émile Bravo (born 18 September 1964) is a French comics artist.

== Biography ==
Émile Bravo was born in Paris in 1964 from Spanish parents (a Catalan father and a Valencian mother). Having grown up with the famous Franco-Belgian comics like Astérix and The Adventures of Tintin, he wanted to become a comics creator. After his studies, he started working for the magazine Marie-France and as an illustrator, before publishing his first comic book in 1990. It was written by Jean Regnaud, with whom he would collaborate on multiple occasions over the next decades.

In 1992, he became a member of the "Atelier Nawak" (later the Atelier des Vosges) and their publishing branch L'Association, working together with people like Joann Sfar, Lewis Trondheim, David B., and Christophe Blain. There he met and advised Marjane Satrapi.

== Bibliography ==
- Ivoire

written by Jean Regnaud, Atomium, 1990; translated in Dutch

- Aleksis Strogonov

3 albums, with Jean Regnaud, 1993-1998

- Épatantes aventures de Jules

6 albums at Dargaud, from 2000 on, winner of the 2002 Angoulême International Comics Festival René Goscinny award for the second album La Réplique Inattendue, from 2001

- The Seven Squat Bears

Three albums, originally published between 2004 and 2009. Translated in English as Goldlocks and the Seven Squat Bears, Orbit, 2010; The Hunger of the Seven Squat Bears, Orbit, 2011; and Beauty and the Squat Bears, Orbit, 2011. Nominated for the 2012 Eisner Awards in the category Best Publication for Early Readers (up to age 7)

- Ma maman est en Amérique, elle a rencontré Buffalo Bill, Gallimard, 2007; translated as My Mommy Is in America and She Met Buffalo Bill, Ponet Mon, 2009

written by Jean Regnaud; named one of the five Angoulême International Comics Festival Essentials, and nominated for the 2007 Prix Saint-Michel for Youth Comics and the 2010 Deutscher Jugendliteraturpreis for children's books; also translated in Spanish, German and Dutch

- Spirou et Fantasio: Journal d'un ingénu, Dupuis, 2008

winner of the Prix RTL, Prix des Libraires BD, Prix Saint-Michel for best French-language comic, and the Award for the best comic of 2009 by the readers of Libération, and named one of the five Angoulême International Comics Festival Essentials; translated in Spanish, Dutch, Danish and Marols
