= Didier Lefèvre =

French photojournalist

- Born: 19 December 1957; France
- Died: 29 January 2007 (aged 49); Morangis, Essonne, Paris, France
- Known for: Photography
- Notable work: The Photographer: Into War-Torn Afghanistan with Doctors Without Borders

Didier Lefèvre (1957–2007) was a French photojournalist. His photos have appeared in many French magazines, including L'Express and Éditions Ouest France. He was best known for co-authoring with Emmanuel Guibert the book The Photographer, which told the story of his travels with a Médecins Sans Frontières mission during the Soviet–Afghan War.

Lefèvre shot more than 4,000 photos on his 1986 MSF mission. He suffered from chronic furunculosis; he lost fourteen teeth after the MSF mission as a consequence of malnutrition, exhaustion, and stress from his experiences. Nonetheless, Lefèvre returned to Afghanistan seven more times later in life.

Lefèvre was trained as a pharmacist. He died from heart failure on 29 January 2007 at the age of 49.

== Awards ==
- 2004: Prix des libraires de bande dessinée for The Photographer (with Lemercier and Guibert )
- 2007: Angoulême International Comics Festival Essentials for The Photographer (with Guibert et Lemercier)
- 2007: Globes de Cristal Award for Best Comic Book for The Photographer (with Guibert et Lemercier)
- 2010: Eisner Award for The Photographer (with Guibert)
