= Marc-Antoine Mathieu =

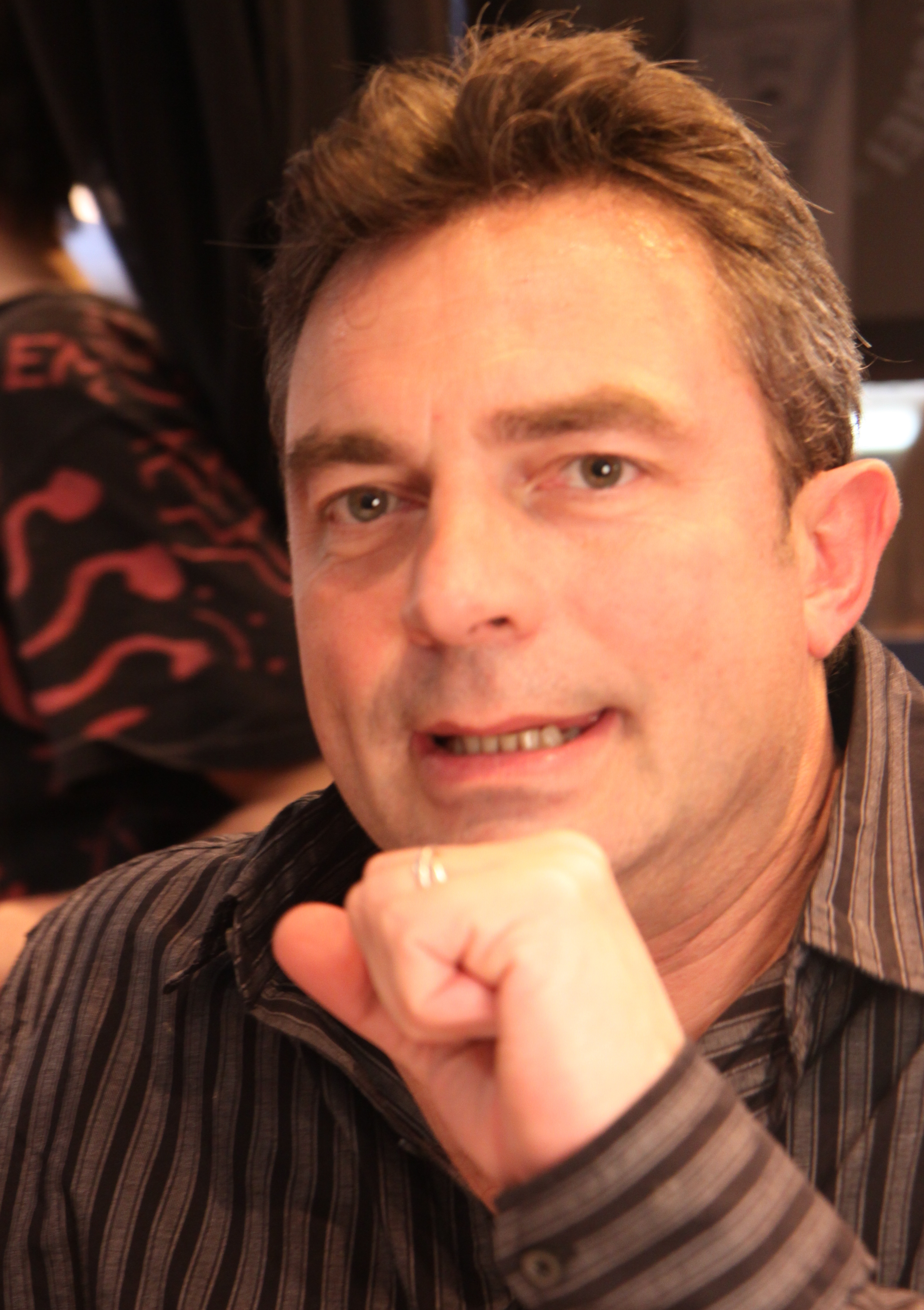
- Born: 3 June 1959 (age 67) Antony, France
- Areas: Cartoonist; Writer; Penciller
- Notable works: Julius Corentin Acquefacques, prisonnier des rêves

Marc-Antoine Mathieu (born 1959 in Antony) is a French comic book artist and writer. He is notably known by his experimental series Julius Corentin Acquefacques, prisonnier des rêves. He is also a set designer, through the Lucie Lom workshop, which he co-founded with Philippe Leduc.

== Life ==
Marc-Antoine Mathieu was born in 1959 in Antony. He grew up in Angers where he studied fine arts. He worked on graphic design and scenography in the "Lucie Lom" studio. He began by publishing in various magazines such as Marcel, Le Banni and Morsures. His first book was published by Futuropolis in 1988.

In 1990, he published L'Origine (The Origin) with Delcourt, the first volume of his series Julius Corentin Acquefacques, prisonnier des rêves (Prisoner of Dreams) The hero of the story, Julius Corentin Acquefacques, works at the Ministry of Humor. One day, he receives a letter containing plate No. 4 of a comic strip called "The Origin," which appears at the beginning of the story. Julius then begins to question the meaning of his world, destiny, and the existence of a higher being...

This album received the Alph-Art Coup de Cœur award at the 1991 Angoulême Festival. Six additional volumes have followed to date: La Qu..., Le Processus (Best Writing at Angoulême 1994), Le Début de la fin, La 2,333ème Dimension, Le Décalage, and L'Hyperrêve.

Marc-Antoine Mathieu also received the Best Album Award for Le Dessin at the Festival de Sierre in 2002.

== Selected works ==
- Julius Corentin Acquefacques, prisonnier des rêves (éditions Delcourt)
    1. L'Origine 1990 (ISBN 2906187798)
    2. La Qu... 1991 (ISBN 2906187690)
    3. Le Processus 1993 (ISBN 2840550113)
    4. Le Début de la fin / La fin du début 1995 (ISBN 2840550563)
    5. La 2,333e Dimension 2004 (ISBN 2847891609)
    6. Le Décalage 2013 (ISBN 978-2-7560-3108-8)
- 1999 - Memoire Morte (Delcourt)
  - English edition:Dead Memory. Dark Horse, 2004
- 2006 - Les sous-sols du révolu: Extraits du journal d'un expert (Futuropolis)
  - The Museum Vaults: Excerpts from the Journal of an Expert. NBM, 2008
- 2011 - 3" (Delcourt)
  - English edition: 3", Jonathan Cape, 2013
