= Étienne Davodeau =

French artist and writer (born 1965)

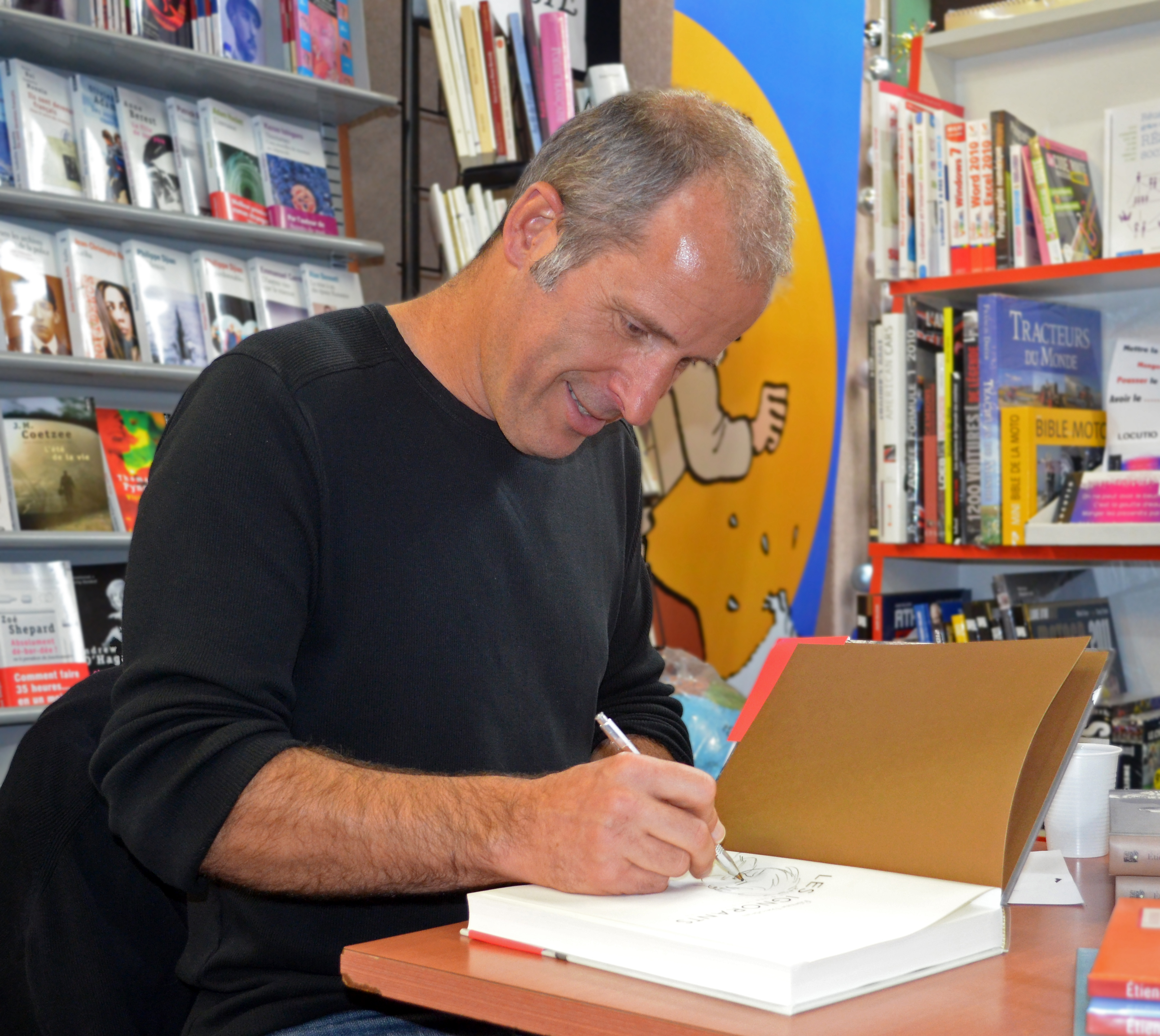
- Born: October 19, 1965
- Occupation: Writer, illustrator
- Awards: Prix Tournesol (2002); prix Ouest-France-Quai des Bulles (2009); prix Amerigo Vespucci de la bande dessinée géographique (2022); France Info Prize (2006); France Info Prize (2007); RTL Prize for comic book (2025); (1998)
- Website: www.etiennedavodeau.com

Étienne Davodeau (born October 19, 1965) is a French comic book artist and writer.

== Life and career ==
Davodeau was born on October 19, 1965, in Botz-en-Mauges into a working-class family, as he explains in Les Mauvaises Gens, a book that retraces his parents' youth: born in 1942, they began working in local industry at the ages of 13 and 14 and became members of the Young Christian Workers, of the French Confederation of Christian Workers then unionists of the French Democratic Confederation of Labour.

After his baccalauréat, Davodeau studied at the University of Rennes 2 (department of visual arts); he then founded, with other comics enthusiasts, including his future collaborators Joub and Jean-Luc Simon, the studio Psurd.

He published his first album, L'Homme qui n'aimait pas les arbres, in 1992, in the collection for young authors, "Génération Dargaud.

In 2011, he published the comic album Les Ignorants (The Initiates), the story of his initiation to the work of winemaking and his exchanges with the winegrower. In 2016, the cartoonists Fleur Godart and Justine Saint-Lô follow the same approach for their book Pur jus, about natural wines.

He won two years in a row the France Info Prize for comics journalism: in 2006 for Les Mauvaises Gens : une histoire de militants, and the following year for Un homme est mort, written with Kris.

In 2013, he was awarded the "Grand Boum-Ville de Blois" prize by the bd BOUM festival, for the whole of his work. That same year, his two-volume comic album Lulu femme nue (Lulu Anew), published in 2008 and 2010, received a film adaptation of the same name directed by Sólveig Anspach. In 2015, the film was nominated to a César Award for Best Adaptation in the occasion of the 40th César Awards.

In 2014, he directed with Benoît Collombat a series of reports, pre-published in La Revue Dessinée. The first episode, Mort d'un juge, is about the assassination of Judge François Renaud in 1975. The album Cher pays de notre enfance, published in 2015, is described as an investigation into the leaden years of the Fifth Republic.

Since the late 1990s, Étienne Davodeau lives at Rablay-sur-Layon (Maine-et-Loire) ; he was elected councilman from 2014 to 2016.

== Notes and references ==
=== External links ===
- Official site (in French)
