= The Photographer (comics) =

Nonfiction graphic novel

The Photographer: Into War-torn Afghanistan with Doctors Without Borders (Le Photographe)
- The cover of the American edition
- Date: 2006
- Page count: 288 pages
- Publisher: Dupuis

Creative team
- Writers: Emmanuel Guibert, Didier Lefèvre
- Artists: Emmanuel Guibert, Didier Lefèvre
- Colorists: Frédéric Lemercier

Original publication
- Issues: 3
- Date of publication: 2003–2006

Translation
- Publisher: First Second Books
- Date: 2009
- ISBN: 1-59643-375-2
- Translator: Alexis Siegel

The Photographer: Into War-torn Afghanistan with Doctors Without Borders is a nonfiction graphic novel by Emmanuel Guibert, Didier Lefèvre, and Frédéric Lemercier. The Photographer tells the true story of Didier Lefèvre, a French photojournalist, who accompanied a Médecins Sans Frontières mission during the height of the Soviet–Afghan War in 1986. The book interweaves Lefèvre's black-and-white photographs and Guibert's illustrations—combined with captions and word balloons—to create the narrative.

First published by Dupuis in three volumes from 2003 through 2006, The Photographer sold 250,000 copies in France and won the Essentials of Angoulême award in 2007. It has been translated from the original French into 11 languages. First Second published the English edition in 2009.

== Background ==
Lefèvre returned from the mission with 4,000 photos. (He also lost 14 teeth due to malnutrition and exhaustion.) The vast majority of Lefèvre's photos remained unpublished for decades after his return. Lefèvre's friend, cartoonist Emmanuel Guibert, encouraged Lefèvre to combine his photos with Guibert's artwork to make a book about the experience. The project was synthesized (and colored) by designer Frédéric Lemercier.

Although Lefèvre lived to see the success of the book in France, he died from heart failure in 2007, before the American edition was published.

== Synopsis ==
The book divides the three-month trip into three parts: the journey into Afghanistan, the medical mission, and the trip out.

The book opens in Pakistan, with the then-29-year-old Lefèvre meeting the members of the team, including leader Juliette Fournot. It then documents the mission's trip to Afghanistan's Yaftali Sufla District (part of the Badakhshan Province), to the town of Zaragandara, to establish a field hospital and staff another one. There are many photos and illustrations of the country's rugged natural beauty—as well as the destruction caused by the ongoing war. All during these moments, the reader learns about Afghan customs, women's roles, a doctor's story of how he came to Afghanistan, and much more.

The book shows the team's reception in Afghanistan: being greeted and hosted by local leaders, and seeing teenage mujahideen displaying their machine guns before heading to battle. It also shows villagers wounded by Soviet bombs.

The last section follows Lefèvre's near catastrophic attempt to walk back to Pakistan without the rest of the MSF team.

== Reception ==
The American edition received an Eisner Award for Best U.S. Edition of International Material. It was an ALA Notable Books Winner, and was named on many "best of" lists, including YALSA Popular Paperbacks, the Texas Maverick Graphic Novels List, the Amazon.com Best Graphic Novel of the Year, the Washington Post Best Books of the Year, the Library Media Connection Best of the Best, the Shelf Awareness Best of the Year, and the School Library Journal Best Adult Book for High School Students. It was named a Booklist Top Ten Graphic Novel, and a YALSA Great Graphic Novels for Teens.
