= Rutu Modan =

Israeli illustrator and comic book artist (born 1966)

Rutu Modan רוּתוּ מודן
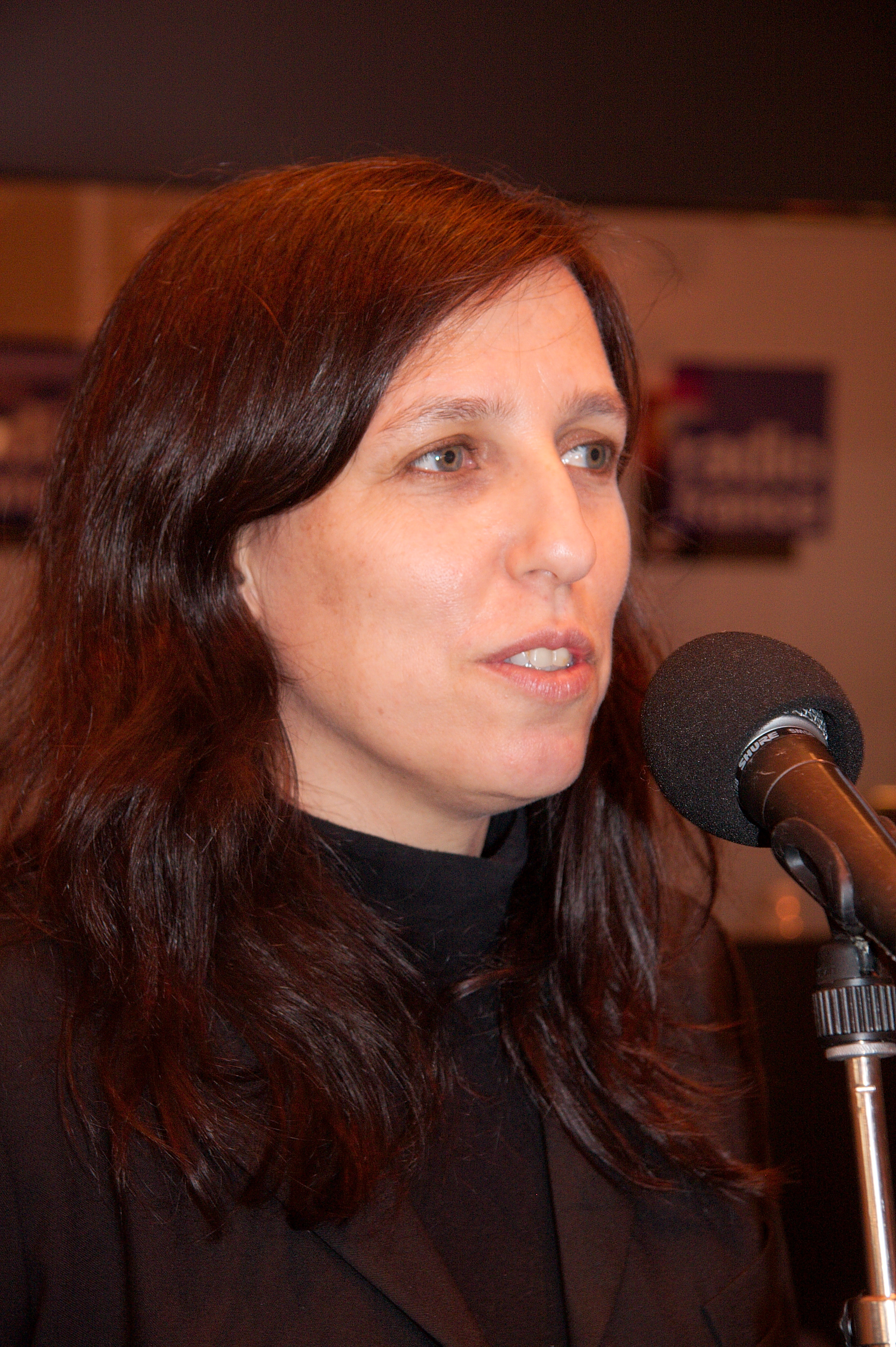
- Modan in 2008
- Born: Rutu Modan; 1966 (age 59–60) Tel Aviv, Israel
- Areas: Illustrator and comic book artist.
- Notable works: Exit Wounds

Rutu Modan (Hebrew: רותו מודן; born 1966) is an Israeli illustrator and comic book artist. She is co-founder of the Israeli comics group Actus Tragicus and published the graphic novels Exit Wounds (2007) and The Property (2013).

== Biography ==
Rutu Modan was born in Tel HaShomer, Israel, in 1966, and lived in the doctors' residences in Sheba Medical Center. Her father was Prof. Baruch Modan, a cancer researcher who served as director general of the Israeli Health Ministry in the 1980s. Her mother was Prof. Michaela Modan, an epidemiologist specializing in diabetes research. Her older sister is a doctor and her younger sister is Dana Modan, an actress and writer. The family moved to Afeka in north Tel Aviv when she was ten.

After graduating with distinction from the Bezalel Academy of Art and Design in Jerusalem, she edited the Hebrew edition of MAD magazine with Yirmi Pinkus. Together they founded the Actus Tragicus comics group in 1995. Modan received the Young Artist of the Year award in 1997 and the Best Illustrated Children's Book award from the Youth Department of the Israel Museum in 1998. In 2005, she was chosen as an outstanding artist of the Israel Cultural Excellence Foundation.

Modan lives in Tel-Aviv with her husband, Ofer Bergman, and their two children.

== Published works ==
=== Novels ===
==== Exit Wounds ====
Modan's first full-length graphic novel, Exit Wounds tells the story of Koby Franco, a 20-something cab driver working in Tel Aviv. Franco's mundane everyday life is interrupted when a female soldier approaches him, claiming his estranged father was killed by a suicide bomber at a train station. He and the young woman begin searching for clues to see if Franco's father, whom the soldier was romantically involved with, is dead or alive.

The book received praise from comic book artist Joe Sacco, author of Palestine, who called it "a profound, richly textured, humane, and unsentimental look at societal malaise and human relationships and that uneasy place where they sometimes intersect."

Douglas Wolk (in The New York Times) compared her style to that of Hergé's The Adventures of Tintin books: "her characters’ body language and facial expressions, rendered in the gestural "clear line" style of Hergé’s Tintin books, are so precisely observed, they practically tell the story by themselves".

Time magazine's Lev Grossman named it one of the Top 10 Graphic Novels of 2007, ranking it at number 8. It also won the 2008 Eisner Award for Best New Graphic Novel.

==== Mixed Emotions ====
Between May and October 2007, several of Modan's graphic stories featured on the New York Times website via "visual blog", translated by Ishai Mishory. The six stories are all memoirs involving Modan herself, and her family. Many of them portray her paternal grandmother, who grew up in Warsaw and fled to Israel after the German occupation of Poland with Rutu’s father and uncle in tow.

- "My First Time in New York City" (May 8) – Modan's trip to New York at the age of 21, accompanied by her father.
- "How I learned to Relax" (June 5) – Modan's first pregnancy.
- "The Most Popular Girl in Warsaw" (July 3) – Modan recounts her grandmother's rules for life and love.
- "A Family Bargain" (July 31) – Modan's family tries to help her buy a new car.
- "Queen of the Scottish Fairies" (September 4) – Modan's son insists on wearing dresses, much to his father's annoyance.
- "Chez Maurice" (October 3) – Modan accompanies her grandmother to a hairdresser.

==== The Murder of the Terminal Patient ====
A graphic serial composed of 17 chapters, which was published on a weekly basis in The New York Times Magazine and ran between June 29 and November 2, 2008. The story dealt with the death of a famous singer in a hospital under mysterious circumstances and the attempts of two men to figure out what happened.

==== War Rabbit ====
In 2009, while Modan was living in England, she was commissioned by the Delcourt to contribute to an anthology of comics journalism. Having initially declined, she had eventually accepted the commission shortly after her return to Israel and the start of the Gaza War. The 13 pages comics called- War Rabbit, had been created via collaboration with the Israeli journalist Igal Sarna and was published in the French anthology and online, in English by Words Without Borders.

==== Maya Makes a Mess ====
The first children's book both written and drawn by Rutu Modan, Maya Makes a Mess was released in 2012 under the Toon Books imprint. It is a graphic novel for early readers. The story follows a young girl with terrible table manners who is unexpectedly invited to dine at the Royal palace, where her manners are put to the test. The story is inspired by both Rutu's recollections of what she liked as a child, and by her own daughter, Michal. When Rutu said to Michal one evening, "How badly you eat! What would you do if the Queen invited you to dine at the palace?" Michal answered very seriously: "Well! It just so happens that the Queen is a VERY good friend of mine, and she told me that I eat perfectly."

==== The Property ====
A full-length graphic novel released in 2013 and based on Modan's own family experiences, The Property tells of an elderly Israeli lady, Regina Segal, taking her granddaughter Mica to Warsaw after the death of her son in the hope of reclaiming a family property lost during the Second World War. As they get to know modern Warsaw, meeting in civic landmarks such as the Powązki Cemetery and the Warsaw Fotoplastikon, Regina is forced to recall difficult things about her past whereas Mica begins to wonder if maybe their reasons for coming aren't a little different from what her grandmother led her to believe. In 2024, a film adaptation of the graphic novel was released in Israel. The film was directed by Rutu's sister, Dana Modan.

==== Minharot ====
Minharot (Tunnels), published in September 2020, is an adventure story about the daughter and grandson of a famous archaeologist who go on a hunt for the Ark of the Covenant in the West Bank.

=== Short stories ===
- "King of the Lillies" (1998) - collected in Jamilti and Other Stories (2008).
- "The Romanian Circus" - originally appeared in the collection Jetlag (1999), based on a short story by Etgar Keret.
- "The Panty Killer" - originally appeared in the collection The Actus Box: Five Graphic Novellas (2001); collected in Jamilti and Other Stories (2008).
- "Homecoming" - originally appeared in the collection Happy End (2002), based on a true story. An Israeli pilot, Gadi, goes M.I.A. over Lebanon, leaving everyone at his Kibbutz unsure whether he's alive or dead. One morning Gadi's father thinks he spots his son’s plane over the kibbutz, and calls everyone out to welcome him. Collected in Jamilti and Other Stories (2008).
- "Fan" - originally appeared in the collection How to Love (2007) as "Your Number One Fan". A musician named Shabtai is invited to perform at a cultural center in Sheffield, England, hoping it will be the big break he had been waiting for. Collected in Jamilti and Other Stories (2008).
- "Bygone" - originally appeared in the collection Flipper vol. 2. Collected in Jamilti and Other Stories (2008).
- "Energy Blockage" - originally appeared in the collection Dead Herring Comics (2004). Collected in Jamilti and Other Stories (2008).
- "Jamilti" - originally appeared in Drawn & Quarterly volume 5 (2003). Collected in Jamilti and Other Stories (2008).

=== Children's books ===
- Where Is?, Written by Tamar Bergman, Houghton Mifflin/Walter Lorraine Books 2002, ISBN 978-0-618-09539-1
- Dad Runs Away With The Circus, Written by Etgar Keret, Cambridge, MA, Candlewick Press, 2004, ISBN 0-7636-2247-8
- Maya Makes a Mess, the first children's book Rutu Modan has written as well as drawn, Toon Books, 2012, ISBN 978-1-935179-17-7

== See also ==
- Women in Israel
- Israeli literature
