= Jean-Philippe Stassen =

Belgian comics creator (born 1966)

- Born: 14 March 1966 (age 60) Liège, Belgium
- Areas: Writer, Artist
- Notable works: Deogratias: A Tale of Rwanda

Jean-Philippe Stassen (born 14 March 1966 in Liège, Belgium) is a Belgian comics creator best known for Deogratias: A Tale of Rwanda.

== Biography ==
Born in Liège to a Flemish father and a Jewish mother, Jean-Philippe Stassen started travelling at a young age. He travelled through Algeria, Morocco, Senegal, Mali, Benin, Ivory Coast, Ghana, Togo, Niger, Nigeria, Burkina Faso, South Africa, Tanzania, Mozambique, Uganda, Burundi and Rwanda. His experiences have been an influence throughout his work.

He was introduced to the magazine L'Écho des Savanes when he was 17 years old. Stassen soon made his debut with the albums Bahamas and Bullwhite at Éditions Albin Michel in 1988 and 1989, both written by Denis Lapière.

Stassen and Lapière continued their collaboration in the collection Aire Libre of Dupuis, where they created the diptych Le Bar du Vieux Français in 1992. The story won them several prizes.

Stassen then wrote Louis le Portugais on his own, another touching human tragedy, this time situated in the suburbs of Liège . He then changed the setting of this stories to Africa again, and created Thérèse. This was followed by Déogratias, about the genocide in Rwanda, and Les Enfants.

Jean-Philippe Stassen currently lives and works in Rwanda.

== Bibliography ==
=== English ===
His comics work in English include:

- Deogratias: A Tale of Rwanda, First Second Books, New York, 2006. ISBN 1-59643-103-2

=== French ===
His comics work in French include:

- Bahamas (with Denis Lapière), Éditions Albin Michel, Paris, 1988
- Bullwhite (with Denis Lapière), Éditions Albin Michel, Paris, 1989
- Le Bar du vieux Français (with Denis Lapière), Dupuis, Marcinelle
  1. Tome 1, 1992
  2. Tome 2, 1993
  - Intégrale, 1999
- Louis le Portugais, Dupuis, Marcinelle, 1998
- Thérèse, Dupuis, Marcinelle, 1999
- Déogratias, Dupuis, Marcinelle, 2000. ISBN 2-8001-2972-7
- Pawa : Chronique des monts de la Lune, Delcourt, Paris, 2002
- Les Enfants, éd. Dupuis, Marcinelle, 2004
- Nous avons tué le chien teigneux (Luis Bernardo Honwana), Chandeigne, Paris, 2006
- Cœur des ténèbres (Heart of Darkness, Joseph Conrad, with Sylvain Venayre), Gallimard, Paris, 2006
- Les visiteurs de Gibraltar (in XXI, N°1), Paris, 2008

== See also ==
- Bibliography of the Rwandan Genocide
