= Angoulême International Comics Festival Prize for Best Album =

Award given annually for excellence in comics

The Prize for Best Album (Prix du meilleur album), also known as the Fauve d'Or ("Golden Wildcat"), is awarded to comics authors at the Angoulême International Comics Festival. As is the customary practice in Wikipedia for listing awards such as Oscar results, the winner of the award for that year is listed first, the others listed below are the nominees.

At the first two festivals (1974 and 1975), prizes were given only to creators, not books. From 1976 to 1978, the "best work" award was presented in four categories, foreign and French realistic and comical work. In 1981, the award was revived as simply "best album." From 1986 to 2001 it was again divided into two awards, French and foreign comic, but since 2002 it has once again returned to a single "best album" category.

== 1970s ==
- 1976: Foreign comical work: La tribu terrible (Redeye) by Gordon Bess (artist) and Greg (author), Le Lombard
- 1976: Foreign realistic work: Corto Maltese: La Ballade de la mer salée by Hugo Pratt, Casterman
- 1976: French comical work: Gai-Luron: En écrase méchamment by Gotlib, Vaillant
- 1976: French realistic work: Le vagabond des limbes: L'empire des soleils noirs by Julio Ribera (artist) and Christian Godard (author), Dargaud
- 1977: Foreign comical work: Andy Capp: Si c'est pas pire, ça ira! by Reginald Smythe, SAGE
- 1977: Foreign realistic work: Les Peaux-Rouges: Les Maîtres du tonnerre by Hans G. Kresse, Casterman
- 1977: French comical work: Le Baron noir part 1 by Yves Got (artist) and René Pétillon (author), GOT
- 1977: French realistic work: Légende et réalité de Casque d'or by Annie Goetzinger, Glénat
- 1978: Foreign comical work: Boule et Bill by Roba, Dupuis
- 1978: Foreign realistic work: Alack Sinner part 1 by José Antonio Muñoz (artist) and Carlos Sampayo (author), Ed. du Square
- 1978: French comical work: Le Génie des alpages: Barre-toi de mon herbe by F'Murr, Dargaud
- 1978: French realistic work: Alix: Le Spectre de Carthage by Jacques Martin, Casterman
- (1979: no award in this category)

== 1980s ==
- (1980: no award in this category)
- 1981: Paracuellos by Carlos Giménez, AUDIE
- 1981 (joint winner): Silence by Comès, Casterman
- 1982: Jonathan: Kate by Cosey, Le Lombard
- 1983: Alack Sinner: Flic ou privé by José Antonio Muñoz and Carlos Sampayo, Casterman
- 1984: Marcel Labrume: À la recherche des guerres perdues by Attilio Micheluzzi, Les Humanoïdes Associés
- 1985: Les Cités Obscures: La fièvre d'Urbicande by François Schuiten and Benoît Peeters, Casterman
- 1986: La Femme du magicien by Jerome Charyn and François Boucq, Casterman
- 1986: Foreign comic: Torpedo: Chaud devant by Jordi Bernet and Enrique Sánchez Abulí, Albin Michel
- 1987: Vic Valence: Une nuit chez Tennessee by Jean-Pierre Autheman, Dargaud
- 1987: Foreign comic: Un été indien (Indian Summer) by Hugo Pratt and Milo Manara, Casterman
- 1988: Jonathan Cartland: les Survivants de l’ombre by Laurence Harlé and Michel Blanc-Dumont, Dargaud
- 1988: Foreign comic: Maus: Un survivant raconte by Art Spiegelman, Flammarion
- 1989: Théodore Poussin: Marie-Vérité by Frank Le Gall and Yann (comics), Dupuis
  - 1989 (special mention): Gens de France et d'ailleurs by Jean Teulé, Casterman
- 1989: Foreign comic: Les Gardiens (Watchmen): Ozymandias by Alan Moore and Dave Gibbons, Zenda

== 1990s ==
- 1990: Gazoline et la Planète rouge by Jano, Albin Michel
- 1990: Foreign comic: V pour Vendetta (V for Vendetta): Visages by David Lloyd and Alan Moore, Zenda
- 1991: Le Chemin de l'Amérique (Road to America) by Baru, Jean-Marc Thévenet and Daniel Ledran, Albin Michel
- 1991: Foreign comic: Manuel Montano by Miguelanxo Prado and Luna, Casterman
- 1992: Couma acò by Edmond Baudoin, Futuropolis
- 1992: Foreign comic: Calvin & Hobbes: En avant tête de thon! by Bill Watterson, Hors Collection
- 1993: Basil et Victoria: Jack by Edith and Yann (comics), Les Humanoïdes Associés
- 1993: Foreign comic: Maus part 2 by Art Spiegelman, Flammarion
- 1994: L'Histoire du corbac aux baskets by Fred, Dargaud
- 1994: Foreign comic: Trait de craie by Miguelanxo Prado, Casterman
- 1995: Le cahier bleu by André Juillard, Casterman
- 1995: Foreign comic: Jonas Fink: L’enfance by Vittorio Giardino, Casterman
- 1996: L'Autoroute du soleil by Baru, Casterman
- 1996: Foreign comic: Bone: La forêt sans retour by Jeff Smith, Delcourt
- 1997: Qui a tué l'idiot ? by Nicolas Dumontheuil, Casterman
- 1997: Foreign comic: Le Silence de Malka by Rubén Pellejero and Jorge Zentner, Casterman
- 1998: Léon la came: Laid, pauvre et malade by Nicolas de Crécy and Sylvain Chomet, Casterman
  - L'ascension du haut mal: Tome 2 (Epileptic) by David B., L'Association
  - La Der des ders by Jacques Tardi and Didier Daeninckx, Casterman
  - Houppeland: Tome 1 by Tronchet, Dupuis
  - Le Sursis: Tome 1 by Jean-Pierre Gibrat, Dupuis
  - Un ver dans le fruit by Pascal Rabaté, Vents d'Ouest
- 1998: Foreign comic: Fax de Sarajevo (Fax from Sarajevo) by Joe Kubert, Vertige Graphic
  - Chicanos by Eduardo Risso and Carlos Trillo, Vents d'Ouest
  - The Far Side by Gary Larson, Dupuis
  - Fleur de Pierre: Partisan by Hisashi Sakaguchi, Vents d'Ouest
  - L'île du Pacifique by Sergio Toppi, Mosquito
  - Jonas Fink: L'apprentissage by Vittorio Giardino, Casterman
- 1999: Monsieur Jean: Vivons heureux sans en avoir l'air by Dupuy and Berberian, Les Humanoïdes Associés
  - Ibicus: Tome 1 by Pascal Rabaté, Vents d'Ouest
  - Le Réflexe de survie by Étienne Davodeau, Delcourt
  - Le Sommeil du monstre by Enki Bilal, Les Humanoïdes Associés
- 1999: Foreign comic: Cages by Dave McKean, Delcourt
  - Big Man by David Mazzucchelli, Cornélius
  - La vie est belle malgré tout (It's a Good Life, If You Don't Weaken) by Seth, Les Humanoïdes Associés

== 2000s ==
- 2000: Ibicus: Tome 2 by Pascal Rabaté, Vents d'Ouest
  - Lie-de-Vin by Olivier Berlion and Éric Corbeyran, Dargaud
  - Professeur Bell: Le mexicain à deux têtes by Joann Sfar, Delcourt
  - La terre sans mal by Emmanuel Lepage and Anne Sibran, Dupuis
  - Zeke raconte des histoires by Cosey, Dupuis
- 2000: Foreign comic: Passage en douce: Carnet d'errance by Helena Klakocar, Fréon
  - 300 by Frank Miller and Lynn Varley, Rackham
  - L'Art invisible (Understanding Comics) by Scott McCloud, Vertige Graphic
  - Comme un gant de velours pris dans la fonte (Like a Velvet Glove Cast in Iron) by Daniel Clowes, Cornélius
  - Tabou by Ruben Pellejero and Jorge Zentner, Casterman
  - Vieilles Canailles: L'esprit de famille by Trillo and Mandrafina, Albin Michel
- 2001: Jack Palmer: L'enquête corse by René Pétillon, Albin Michel
  - Le capitaine écarlate by David B. and Emmanuel Guibert, Dupuis
  - Déogratias by Jean-Philippe Stassen, Dupuis
  - Les Entremondes: Lazaar by Patrice Larcenet and Emmanuel Larcenet, Dargaud
  - Luc Leroi: Toutes les fleurs s'appellent Tiaré by Jean-Claude Denis, Casterman
- 2001: Foreign comic: Le Canard qui aimait les poules by Carlos Nine, Albin Michel
  - A Journal of My Father part 3 by Jiro Taniguchi, Casterman
  - Gemma Bovery by Posy Simmonds, Denoël
  - Caricature by Daniel Clowes, Rackham
  - Grimmy part 10 by Mike Peters, Dargaud
- 2002: Isaac le pirate: Les Amériques by Christophe Blain, Dargaud
  - Aberzen: Commencer par mourir by Marc N'Guessan, Soleil
  - Frida Kahlo by Corona, Rackham
  - Hicksville by Dylan Horrocks, L'Association
  - La lecture des ruines by David B., Dupuis
  - Pilules bleues by Frederik Peeters, Atrabile
  - Tirésias: L'outrage and Tirésias: La révélation by Serge Le Tendre and Christian Rossi, Casterman
  - Uncle Sam by Steve Darnall and Alex Ross, Semic
- 2003: Jimmy Corrigan (Jimmy Corrigan, the Smartest Kid on Earth) by Chris Ware, Delcourt
  - Le Chat du rabbin: Le Malka des lions by Joann Sfar, Dargaud
  - 5 est le numéro parfait (5 is the Perfect Number) by Igort, Casterman
  - David Boring by Daniel Clowes, Cornélius
  - McCay: Les Cœurs retournés by Jean-Philipe Bramanti and Thierry Smolderen, Delcourt
  - Six cent soixante-seize apparitions de Killoffer (676 Apparitions of Killoffer) by Patrice Killoffer, L'Association
- 2004: Le combat ordinaire: Tome 1 (Ordinary Victories) by Emmanuel Larcenet, Dargaud
  - L'ascension du haut mal: Volume 6 (Epileptic) by David B., L'Association
  - Blonde platine (Summer Blonde) by Adrian Tomine, Le Seuil
  - Broderies (Embroideries) by Marjane Satrapi, L'Association
  - Daredevil: Underboss and Daredevil: Le scoop by Brian Michael Bendis and Alex Maleev, Marvel
  - Lupus: Tome 1 by Frédérik Peeters, Atrabile
  - La vie de ma mère: Face A and Face B by Jean-Christophe Chauzy and Thierry Jonquet, Gallimard
- 2005: Poulet aux prunes by Marjane Satrapi, L'Association
  - L'Homme sans talent (The Man Without Talent) by Yoshiharu Tsuge, Ego comme X
  - Louis Riel, l'insurgé (Louis Riel: A Comic-Strip Biography) by Chester Brown, Casterman
  - Lupus: Tome 2 by Frédérik Peeters, Atrabile
  - Mariée par correspondance by Kalesniko, Paquet
  - Panorama de l'enfer by Hideshi Hino, Imho
  - Une tragédie américaine (Boulevard of Broken Dreams) by Kim Deitch, Denoël Graphic
- 2006: Notes pour une histoire de guerre by Gipi, Actes sud
  - Les damnés de Nanterre by Chantal Montellier, Denoel graphic
  - Fritz Haber: l'esprit du temps by David Vandermeulen, Delcourt
  - Hanté by Philippe Dupuy, Cornélius
  - Olivia Sturgess by Floc'h and François Rivière, Dargaud
  - Le petit bleu de la Côte Ouest by Jacques Tardi (after Manchette), Les Humanoïdes Associés
  - Ripple by Dave Cooper, Le Seuil
- 2007: NonNonBâ by Shigeru Mizuki, Cornélius
- 2008: Là où vont nos pères (The Arrival) by Shaun Tan, Dargaud
- 2009: Pinocchio by Winshluss, Les Requins Marteaux

== 2010s ==
- 2010: Pascal Brutal: Tome 3 by Riad Sattouf (Audie)
- 2011: Cinq mille kilomètres par seconde by Manuele Fior (Atrabile)
- 2012: Chroniques de Jérusalem (Jerusalem) by Guy Delisle (Delcourt)
- 2013: Quai d'Orsay: Tome 2 by Christophe Blain and Abel Lanzac (Delcourt)
- 2014: Come Prima by Alfred (cartoonist) (Delcourt)
- 2015: L'Arabe du futur by Riad Sattouf (Allary)
- 2016: Ici by Richard McGuire (Gallimard)
- 2017: Paysage après la bataille by Éric Lambé & Philippe de Pierpont (Actes Sud BD / Frémok)
- 2018: La Saga de Grimr by Jérémie Moreau (Delcourt)
- 2019: My Favorite Thing Is Monsters by Emil Ferris (Fantagraphics)

== 2020s ==
- 2020 : Révolution, vol. 1: Liberté, by Florent Grouazel and Younn Locard (Actes Sud / Éditions de l'An 2
- 2021: L'Accident de chasse (The Hunting Accident) by Landis Blair and David L. Carlson (éditions Sonatine)
- 2022: Écoute, jolie Marcia, by Marcello Quintanilha (Éditions Çà et là)
- 2023: La Couleur des choses, by Martin Panchaud
- 2024: Monica, by Daniel Clowes
- 2025: Deux filles nues, by Luz
