= Eisner Award for Best U.S. Edition of International Material =

American comic book award

- Awarded for: Best U.S. Edition of International Material
- Country: United States
- First award: 1998
- Most recent winner: Nocturnos by Laura Perez, translation by Andrea Rosenberg
- Website: www.comic-con.org/awards/eisner-awards-current-info

The Eisner Award for Best U.S. Edition of International Material is an award for "creative achievement" in American comic books for material not originally published or available in the United States of America.

== History and name change ==
The award was named Best U.S. Edition of Foreign Material from that award's inception in 1998 to 2006. In 2007 the award was split into Best U.S. Edition of International Material and Best U.S. Edition of International Material–Japan (renamed in 2010 to Best U.S. Edition of International Material—Asia).

== Winners and nominees ==
Year	Title	Authors	Translators (Note: Translator was not officially listed until 2017.)	Ref.
1990s
1998	Gon Swimmin' (Paradox Press)	Masashi Tanaka		
1998	Corto Maltese (NBM Publishing)	Hugo Pratt		
1998	A Jew in Communist Prague (NBM Publishing)	Vittorio Giardino		
1998	Nausica of the Valley of the Wind (Viz Media)	Hayao Miyazaki		
1998	What's Michael? (Dark Horse Comics)	Makoto Kobayashi		
1999	Star Wars: A New Hope--Manga (Dark Horse Comics)	Hisao Tamaki		
1999	Blade of the Immortal (Dark Horse Comics)	Hiroaki Samura		
1999	Intron Depot 2: Blades (Dark Horse Comics/Studio Proteus)	Masamune Shirow		
1999	A Jew in Communist Prague, vol. 3: Rebellion (NBM Publishing)	Vittorio Giardino		
1999	Strain, vol. 1 (Viz Media)	Buronson and Ryoichi Ikegami		
2000s
2000	Blade of the Immortal (Dark Horse Comics)	Hiroaki Samura		
2000	After the Rain (NBM Publishing)	André Juillard		
2000	Comix 2000 (L'Association)	edited by Jean-Christophe Menu		
2000	Jetlag (Actus Tragicus)	Etgar Keret, Mira Friedmann, Batia Kolton, Rutu Modan, Yirmi Pinkus, and Itzik Rennert		
2000	The Nimrod (Fantagraphics)	Lewis Trondheim		
2001	Lone Wolf and Cub (Dark Horse Comics)	Kazuo Koike and Goseki Kojima		
2001	Akira, Book One (Dark Horse Comics)	Katsuhiro Otomo		
2001	Eagle: The Making of an Asian-American President (Viz Media)	Kaiji Kawaguchi		
2001	The Extended Dream of Mr. D (Drawn & Quarterly)	Max		
2001	From Cloud 99: Memories, Part I (Humanoids Publishing)	Yslaire		
2001	The Nimrod (Fantagraphics)	Lewis Trondheim		
2002	Akira (Dark Horse Comics)	Katsuhiro Otomo		
2002	Eagle: The Making of an Asian-American President (Viz Media)	Kaiji Kawaguchi		
2002	Hey, Wait... (Fantagraphics)	Jason		
2002	Nogegon (Humanoids Publishing)	Luc Schuiten and François Schuiten		
2002	Uzumaki (Viz Media)	Junji Ito		
2003	Dr. Jekyll & Mr. Hyde (NBM Publishing)	Robert Louis Stevenson, adapted by Jerry Kramsky and Lorenzo Mattotti		
2003	Dead End (Fantagraphics)	Thomas Ott		
2003	Epileptic, vol. 1 (Fantagraphics)	David B.		
2003	Invisible Frontier, vol. 1 (NBM Publishing)	Benoît Peeters and François Schuiten		
2003	Sshhhh! (Fantagraphics)	Jason		
2003	Uzumaki, vols. 2-3 (Viz Media)	Junji Ito		
2004	Buddha, vols. 1 and 2 (Vertical)	Osamu Tezuka		
2004	Blacksad (ibooks)	Juan Díaz Canales and Juanjo Guarnido		
2004	Chaland Anthology: Freddy Lombard, vols. 1 & 2 (Humanoids Publishing)	Yves Chaland		
2004	Little Vampire Does Kung Fu! (Simon & Schuster)	Joann Sfar		
2004	Persepolis (Pantheon Books)	Marjane Satrapi		
2005	Buddha, vols. 3-4 (Vertical)	Osamu Tezuka		
2005	Barefoot Gen: A Cartoon Story of Hiroshima, vols. 1-2 (Last Gasp)	Keiji Nakazawa		
2005	Blacksad Book 2: Arctic Nation (iBooks)	Juan Díaz Canales and Juanjo Guarnido		
2005	Persepolis 2: The Story of a Return (Pantheon Books)	Marjane Satrapi		
2005	Tokyo Tribes (Tokyopop)	Santa Inoue		
2006	The Rabbi's Cat (Pantheon Books)	Joann Sfar		
2006	Cromartie High School (ADV Manga)	Eiji Nonaka		
2006	Dungeon: The Early Years, vol. 1 (NBM Publishing)	Joann Sfar, Lewis Trondheim, and Christophe Blain		
2006	Ordinary Victories (NBM Publishing)	Manu Larcenet		
2006	Six Hundred Seventy-Six Apparitions of Killoffer (Typocrat Press)	Killoffer		
2007	The Left Bank Gang (Fantagraphics)	Jason		
2007	A.L.I.E.E.E.N. (First Second Books)	Lewis Trondheim		
2007	De:TALES (Dark Horse Comics)	Fábio Moon and Gabriel Bá		
2007	Hwy 115 (Fantagraphics)	Matthias Lehmann		
2007	Pizzeria Kamikaze (Alternative Comics)	Etgar Keret and Asaf Hanuka		
2008	I Killed Adolf Hitler (Fantagraphics)	Jason		
2008	The Arrival (Arthur A. Levine Books/Scholastic Corporation)	Shaun Tan		
2008	Aya (Drawn & Quarterly)	Marguerite Abouet and Clément Oubrerie		
2008	Garage Band (First Second Books)	Gipi		
2008	The Killer (Archaia Entertainment)	Matz and Luc Jacamon		
2009	The Last Musketeer (Fantagraphics)	Jason		
2009	Alan's War (First Second Books)	Emmanuel Guibert		
2009	Gus & His Gang (First Second Books)	Christophe Blain		
2009	The Rabbi’s Cat 2 (Pantheon Books)	Joann Sfar		
2009	Tamara Drewe (Mariner Books/Houghton Mifflin Harcourt)	Posy Simmonds		
2010s
2010	The Photographer (First Second Books)	Emmanuel Guibert, Didier Lefèvre, and Frédéric Lemercier		
2010	My mommy is in America and she met Buffalo Bill (Fanfare/Ponent Mon)	Jean Regnaud and Émile Bravo		
2010	Tiny Tyrant vol. 1: The Ethelbertosaurus (First Second Books)	Lewis Trondheim and Fabrice Parme		
2010	West Coast Blues (Fantagraphics)	Jean-Patrick Manchette, adapted by Jacques Tardi		
2010	Years of the Elephant (Fanfare/Ponent Mon)	Willy Linthout		
2011	It Was the War of the Trenches (Fantagraphics)	Jacques Tardi		
2011	The Killer: Modus Vivendi (Archaia Entertainment)	Matz and Luc Jacamon		
2011	King of the Flies, Book One: Hallorave (Fantagraphics)	Mezzo and Pirus		
2011	The Littlest Pirate King (Fantagraphics)	David B. and Pierre Mac Orlan		
2011	Salvatore (NBM Publishing)	Nicolas de Crécy		
2012	The Manara Library, vol. 1: Indian Summer and Other Stories (Dark Horse Books)	Milo Manara with Hugo Pratt		
2012	Bubbles & Gondola (NBM Publishing)	Renaud Dillies		
2012	Isle of 100,000 Graves (Fantagraphics)	Fabien Vehlmann and Jason		
2012	Like a Sniper Lining Up His Shot (Fantagraphics)	Jacques Tardi and Jean-Patrick Manchette		
2012	Night Animals: A Diptych About What Rushes Through the Bushes (Top Shelf Productions)	Brecht Evens		
2013	Blacksad: Silent Hell (Dark Horse Comics)	Juan Díaz Canales and Juanjo Guarnido		
2013	Abelard (NBM Publishing)	Régis Hautière and Renaud Dillies		
2013	Athos in America (Fantagraphics)	Jason		
2013	The Making of (Drawn & Quarterly)	Brecht Evens		
2013	Monsieur Jean: The Singles Theory (Humanoids Publishing)	Philippe Dupuy and Charles Berberian		
2013	New York Mon Amour (Fantagraphics)	Benjamin Legrand, Dominique Grange, and Jacques Tardi		
2014	Goddam This War! (Fantagraphics)	Jacques Tardi and Jean-Pierre Verney		
2014	Adventures of a Japanese Businessman (Nobrow Press)	José Domingo		
2014	Incidents in the Night, Book One (Uncivilized Books)	David B.		
2014	Today Is the Last Day of the Rest of Your Life (Fantagraphics)	Ulli Lust		
2014	When David Lost His Voice (SelfMadeHero)	Judith Vanistendael		
2015	Blacksad: Amarillo (Dark Horse Comics)	Juan Díaz Canales and Juanjo Guarnido		
2015	Beautiful Darkness (Drawn & Quarterly)	Fabien Vehlmann and Kerascoët		
2015	Corto Maltese: Under the Sign of Capricorn (IDW Publishing/EuroComics)	Hugo Pratt		
2015	Jaybird (Dark Horse Comics/Strip Art Features)	Lauri Ahonen and Jaakko Ahonen		
2015	The Leaning Girl (Alaxis Press)	Benoît Peeters and François Schuiten		
2016	The Realist (Boom! Studios/Archaia Entertainment)	Asaf Hanuka		
2016	Alpha...Directions (Knockabout Comics/Fanfare)	Jens Harder		
2016	The Eternaut (Fantagraphics)	Héctor Germán Oesterheld and Francisco Solano López		
2016	A Glance Backward (Magnetic Press)	Pierre Paquet and Tony Sandoval		
2016	The March of the Crabs (Boom! Studios/Archaia Entertainment)	Arthur de Pins		
2017	Moebius Library: The World of Edena (Dark Horse Comics)	Jean “Moebius” Giraud, et al.		
2017	Equinoxes (NBM Publishing)	Cyril Pedrosa	Joe Johnson	
2017	Irmina (SelfMadeHero)	Barbara Yelin	Michael Waaler	
2017	Love: The Lion (Magnetic Press)	Frédéric Brrémaud and Federico Bertolucci		
2017	Wrinkles (Fantagraphics)	Paco Roca	Erica Mena	
2018	Run for It: Stories of Slaves Who Fought for the Freedom (Fantagraphics)	Marcelo D’Salete	Andrea Rosenberg	
2018	Audubon: On the Wings of the World (Nobrow Press)	Fabien Grolleau and Jerémie Royer	Etienne Gilfillan	
2018	Flight of the Raven (EuroComics/IDW Publishing)	Jean-Pierre Gibrat	Diana Schutz and Brandon Kander	
2018	FUN (SelfMadeHero)	Paolo Bacilieri	Jamie Richards	
2018	Ghost of Gaudi (Lion Forge Comics/Magnetic Press)	El Torres and Jesús Alonso Iglesias	Esther Villardón Grande	
2018	The Ladies-in-Waiting (Fantagraphics)	Santiago García and Javier Olivares		
2019	Brazen: Rebel Ladies Who Rocked the World (First Second Books)	Pénélope Bagieu	Montana Kane	
2019	About Betty's Boob (Archaia Entertainment/Boom! Studios)	Vero Cazot and Julie Rocheleau	Edward Gauvin	
2019	Herakles, Book 1 (Magnetic Press/Lion Forge Comics)	Édouard Cour	Jeremy Melloul	
2019	Niourk (Dark Horse Comics)	Stefan Wul and Olivier Vatine	Brandon Kander and Diana Schutz	
2019	A Sea of Love (Magnetic Press/Lion Forge Comics)	Wilfrid Lupano and Grégory Panaccione		
2020s
2020	The House (Fantagraphics)	Paco Roca	Andrea Rosenberg	
2020	Diabolical Summer (IDW Publishing)	Thierry Smolderen and Alexandre Clérisse	Edward Gauvin	
2020	Gramercy Park (EuroComics/IDW Publishing)	Timothée de Fombelle and Christian Cailleaux	Edward Gauvin	
2020	Maggy Garrisson (SelfMadeHero)	Lewis Trondheim and Stéphane Oiry	Emma Wilson	
2020	Stay (Magnetic Press)	Lewis Trondheim and Hubert Chevillard	Mike Kennedy	
2020	Wrath of Fantômas (Titan Comics)	Olivier Bouquet and Julie Rocheleau		
2021	Goblin Girl (Fantagraphics)	Moa Romanova	Melissa Bowers	
2021	Altitude (SelfMadeHero)	Olivier Bocquet and Jean-Marc Rochette	Edward Gauvin	
2021	Gamayun Tales I: An Anthology of Modern Russian Folk Tales (Nobrow)	Alexander Utkin	Lada Morozova	
2021	Irena Books 2-3 (Magnetic Press)	Jean-David Morvan, Severine Tréfouël, and David Evrard	Dan Christensen	
2021	When You Look Up (Enchanted Lion Books)	Decur	Chloe Garcia Roberts	
2021	The Winter of the Cartoonist (Fantagraphics)	Paco Roca	Andrea Rosenberg	
2022	The Shadow of a Man (IDW Publishing)	Benoît Peeters and François Schuiten	Stephen D. Smith	
2022	Ballad For Sophie (Top Shelf Productions)	Filipe Melo, Juan Cavia	Gabriela Soares	
2022	Between Snow and Wolf (Magnetic Press)	Agnes Domergue, Helene Canac	Maria Vahrenhorst	
2022	Love: The Mastiff (Magnetic Press)	Frederic Brrémaud, Federico Bertolucci		
2022	The Parakeet (Penn State University Press)	Espé	Hannah Chute	
2023	Blacksad: They All Fall Down Part 1 (Dark Horse Comics)	Juan Díaz Canales and Juanjo Guarnido	Diana Schutz and Brandon Kander	
2023	Always Never (Dark Horse Comics)	Jordi Lafebre	Montana Kane	
2023	Down to the Bone: A Leukemia Story (Penn State University Press)	Catherine Pioli	J. T. Mahany	
2023	The Pass (Penn State University Press)	Espé	J. T. Mahany	
2023	Tiki: A Very Ruff Year (Life Drawn/Humanoids)	David Azencot and Fred Leclerc	Nanette McGuinness	
2024	Blacksad, Vol 7: They All Fall Down Part 2 (Dark Horse Comics)	Juan Díaz Canales and Juanjo Guarnido	Diana Schutz and Brandon Kander	
2024	Ashes (Top Shelf/IDW)	Álvaro Ortiz	Eva Ibarzabal	
2024	A Boy Named Rose (Fairsquare Comics)	Gaëlle Geniller	Fabrice Sapolsky	
2024	The Great Beyond (Drawn & Quarterly)	Léa Murawiec	Aleshia Jensen	
2024	Shubeik Lubeik (Pantheon Books/Penguin Random House)	Deena Mohamed		
2024	Spa (Fantagraphics)	Erik Svetoft	Melissa Bowers	
2025	The Jellyfish (Pow Pow Press)	Boum	Robin Lang and Helge Dascher	
2025	All Princesses Die Before Dawn (Abrams ComicArts)	Quentin Zuttion		
2025	Mothballs (Fantagraphics)	Sole Otero	Andrea Rosenberg	
2025	Return to Eden (Fantagraphics)	Paco Roca	Andrea Rosenberg	
2025	Sunday (Fantagraphics)	Olivier Schrauwen		
2026	Nocturnos (Fantagraphics)	Laura Perez	Andrea Rosenberg	
2026	Buff Soul (Fantagraphics)	Moa Romanova	Melissa Bowers	
2026	Cornelius: The Merry Life of a Wretched Dog (Drawn & Quarterly)	Marc Torices	Andrea Rosenberg	
2026	In the End We All Die (Helvetiq)	Tobias Aeschbacher	Andrew Shields	
2026	Raging Clouds (Fantagraphics)	Yudori		
2026	Mothballs (Abrams ComicArts)	Anaïs Flogny	Dan Christensen	

== See also ==
- Eisner Award for Best U.S. Edition of International Material—Asia
- Eisner Award for Best Publication for Early Readers
- Eisner Award for Best Academic/Scholarly Work
