= List of EuroComics publications =

EuroComics is an imprint of The Library of American Comics and IDW Publishing, which publishes European comics and graphic novels.

This is a list of EuroComics publications.

== Publications ==
EuroComics: collections
Release date	Title	Original title	Genre(s)	Creator(s)	Period	Number of volumes	Reproduction color	Book type & size
2015-01	Corto Maltese	Corto Maltese	Adventure	Hugo Pratt	1970–1989	12	Black-and-white	Softcover 9.25 × 11.63 inches (235 × 295 mm)
2017-10 –	Jerome K. Jerome Bloche	Jerome K. Jerome Bloche	Mystery	Alain Dodier, Pierre Makyo, Serge Le Tendre	1982–?	2	Full color	Hardcover 8.5 × 11 inches (216 × 280 mm)
2017-05 – 2018-05	Alack Sinner	Alack Sinner	Crime	José Muñoz, Carlos Sampayo	1975-200?	2	Black-and-white	Softcover with French flaps 8 × 11 inches (203 × 280 mm)
2018-05 –	Four Sisters	Les quatre sœurs	Drama, Adventure	Lucie Durbiano, Malika Ferdjoukh	4	2	Full color	Hardcover 8.5 × 11 inches (216 × 280 mm)
200? –	Rose	Rose	Mystery	Valérie Vernay, Denis Lapiere, Emilie Albert	?	?	Full color	Hardcover 8.5 × 11 inches (216 × 280 mm)
2018-09	The Quest of Ewilan	La quête d'Ewilan	Fantasy	Lylian, Loïc Chevallier, Pierre Bottero, Laurence Baldetti	?	?	Full color	Hardcover 8.5 × 11 inches (216 × 280 mm)
2018-03 –	Violette Around the World	Viola giramondo	Adventure	Teresa Radice, Stefano Turconi	?	2	Full color	Hardcover 8.5 × 11 inches (216 × 280 mm)
2018-10 –	Enola Holmes	Les enquêtes d'Enola Holmes	Mystery	Serena Blasco	?	2	Full color	Hardcover 8.5 × 11 inches (216 × 280 mm)
2018-12 –	Mattéo	Mattéo	Adventure; Historical	Jean-Pierre Gibrat	2008-2014	3	Full color	Hardcover 8.5 inches × 11 inches (216 mm × 280 mm)

EuroComics: standalone titles
Release date	Title	Original title	Genre(s)	Creator(s)	Period	Reproduction color	Book type & size	ISBN
2016-07-19	The Adventures of Dieter Lumpen	Dieter Lumpen	Adventure	Jorge Zentner, Rubén Pellejero	1985-1994	Full color	Softcover 8.5 × 11 inches (216 × 280 mm)	978-1-631406-065
2017-02-28	Flight of the Raven	Le Vol du corbeau	Historical fiction	Jean-Pierre Gibrat	?	Full color	Softcover 8.5 × 11 inches (216 × 280 mm)	978-1-631407-987
2017-12-12	Lights of the Amalou	Les lumières de l'Amalou	Fantasy, Science fiction	Christophe Gibelin, Claire Wendling	?	Full color	Softcover 8.5 × 11 inches (216 × 280 mm)	978-1-631409-165
2017-11-21	The Man from the Great North	L'uomo del Grande Nord (also known as Jesuit Joe)	Adventure	Hugo Pratt	?	Full color	Hardcover 8.9 × 11.3 inches (226 × 287 mm)	978-1-684050-581
2016-03-22	Paracuellos	Paracuellos	Memoir	Carlos Giménez	1975	Full color	Softcover 8.5 × 10.9 inches (216 × 277 mm)	978-1-631404-689
2018-07-24	The Silence of Malka	Le Silence de Malka	Historical fiction	Jorge Zentner, Rubén Pellejero	?	Full color	Hardcover 8.5 × 11 inches (216 × 280 mm)	978-1-684052-875
2018-01-23	Tales from the Age of the Cobra	Les Contes de l'ère du Cobra	Adventure, Fantasy	Enrique Fernández	?	Full color	Softcover 8.5 × 11 inches (216 × 280 mm)	978-1-684050-635
2018-04-24	The Reprieve	Le Sursis	Historical fiction	Jean-Pierre Gibrat	?	Full color	Softcover 8.5 × 11 inches (216 × 280 mm)	978-1-684051-915
