= Mezzo =

Mezzo is the Italian word for "half", "middle" or "medium". It may refer to:

== Music ==
- Mezzo-soprano or mezzo, a type of classical female singing voice whose range lies between the soprano and the contralto singing voices
- Mezzo forte ("medium-loud") and mezzo piano ("medium-quiet"), musical terms for dynamics
- Mezzo staccato, an articulation halfway between legato and staccato

== Other uses ==
- Mezzo (artist) (born 1960), a French cartoonist
- Mezzo Buttress, a glacier in Antarctica
- Mezzo DSA, a 2003 anime series, the sequel to the Mezzo Forte anime movie
- Mezzo Forte, an anime movie
- Mezzo Mix, a beverage sold by Coca-Cola in Germany, Finland and Austria
- Mezzo TV, a television channel in France
- Mezzo, a common name in the 19th century for the island of Lopud, Croatia

== See also ==
- Mezzo soprano (disambiguation)
- Mezza, the feminine equivalent of Mezzo
- Mezzanine, an intermediate ("halfway") floor in a building
- Mezzoforte (band), an Icelandic band
