= Bête Noire =

Bête noire ("black beast" in French, meaning something that is an object of aversion or the bane of one’s existence) may refer to:

- Bête Noire (album), a 1987 album by Bryan Ferry
- Bête Noire (comics), a 2005 comics anthology
- "Bête Noire" (NCIS), a 2004 TV episode
- "Bête Noire" (Black Mirror), an episode of the seventh series of Black Mirror
- Bête Noire, Cajun French name for Honey Island Swamp monster, a Bigfoot-like creature in Louisiana folklore

== See also ==
- Black Beast (disambiguation)
- Glossary of French words and expressions in English
