= The Red Tree (picture book) =

2001 picture book by Shaun Tan

- First edition cover
- Author: Shaun Tan
- Illustrator: Shaun Tan
- Language: English
- Genre: Picture book
- Publisher: Lothian Books
- Publication date: 2001
- Publication place: Australia
- Media type: Picture book
- Pages: 24
- ISBN: 9780734401724
- OCLC: 155754630
- Dewey Decimal: A823.3
- Website: http://www.shauntan.net/books/red-tree.html

The Red Tree (2001), written and illustrated by Australian writer and illustrator Shaun Tan, is a picture book that presents a fragmented journey through a dark world. The text is sparse and the illustrations are dark and surreal.

== Synopsis ==
The story is based on images inspired by the experience of depression. The main character is a lonely red-headed girl who goes about her day feeling alienated, despondent, and lonely. The illustrations depict her in various abstract situations that metaphorically depict her feelings. Almost unnoticed in each picture is a small red leaf (symbolising hope). At the end, the little girl stands smiling at a beautiful red-leafed tree growing in her bedroom. This little tree that has now beautifully blossomed in the center of her room is symbolized as her reward for the hardships she has been through in her life.

This book is one of many picture books by Tan, who also addresses issues such as immigration and cultural differences.

== Critical reception ==
A reviewer in Publishers Weekly was taken with the look and feel and the book: "Strange, melancholy imagery and pessimistic forecasts ('sometimes the day begins/ with nothing to look forward to') weigh like millstones on this slender book, but the appearance of a stunning 'red tree' lifts the burden in the end...Tan's (The Lost Thing) intricate paintings marvelously evoke emotional states, and the red leaf serves as a reminder that creativity can emerge despite abject conditions."

In Kirkus Reviews the writer noted that Tan "creates an unusual work for the very young that illuminates a dark side too often ignored or unacknowledged in children...The images are obsessively detailed and full of surreal juxtapositions, and the child, who appears in a tiny boat, trapped in a bottle, and in various Bosch-inspired landscapes, lifts her head and smiles only on the last page, when she sees that flame-colored tree. An imaginative, sad, and ultimately uplifting tale of very few words and extraordinary images."

== Awards ==
- Winner of NSW Premier's Literary Award Patricia Wrightson Prize 2002
- Shortlisted for Western Australian Premier's Book Awards: Children's Books 2001
- Shortlisted for APA Design Awards: Scholastic Best Designed Children's Book 2002
- Finalist for Locus Award for Best Art Book 2002

== See also ==
- 2001 in Australian literature
- The Red Tree at WorldCat
