= Mezza =

Mezza can refer to:

- Meze, small dishes in Middle Eastern cuisine
- Italian meaning half (see masculine form mezzo), particularly in musical terms
  - Mezza voce, half-voiced singing technique
- Colloquial term for the Merry Hill Shopping Centre.
