= Bête Noire (comics) =

Bête Noire is an international comics anthology published by Fantagraphics Books. While planned to be four issues, only the first issue was published.

== Issue one ==
The first issue featured the following artists:

- Suzy Amakane (Japan)
- MS Bastian (Switzerland)
- Frédéric Coché (France)
- Ichiba Daisuke (Japan)
- Adam Dant (United Kingdom)
- Ludovic Debeurme (France)
- Lucie Durbiano (France)
- Quentin Faucompré (France)
- Anke Feuchtenberger (Germany)
- Reijo Karkkainen (Finland)
- Peter Köhler (Sweden)
- Ben Jones (United States)
- Olaf Ladousse (Spain)
- Junko Mizuno (Japan)
- Morgan Navarro (France)
- Takeshi Nemoto (Japan)
- Helge Reumann (Switzerland)
- Caroline Sury (Japan)
- Henriette Valium (Canada)
- Fabio Viscogliosi (Italy)
- F© + Witko (France)
- Yuichi Yokoyama (Japan)
