= McCay =

McCay is a surname. Notable people with the surname include:

- Albert McCay (1901–1969), American politician from New Jersey
- Bill McCay (born 1951), American author of over seventy books
- Bob McCay (1896–1962), American cartoonist
- Clive McCay (1898–1967), biochemist, nutritionist, gerontologist, and professor of Animal Husbandry at Cornell University
- Daniel McCay (fl. 2010s–present), American politician from Utah
- Henry Kent McCay (1820–1886), United States federal judge
- James Whiteside McCay KCMG, KBE, CB, VD (1864–1930), Australian general and politician
- Liam McCay (born 2005), Irish slowcore artist
- Norman McCay, fictional character from the DC Comics series Kingdom Come
- Patrick McCay (born 1952), Irish born Scottish-American painter who resides in the Boston area
- Peggy McCay (1927–2018), American actress, with a career spanning over fifty years in films, television and soap operas
- Ryan McCay (born 1986), Scottish footballer
- Winsor McCay (1869–1934), American cartoonist and animator

== See also ==
- Winsor McCay Award, given to individuals in recognition of lifetime or career contributions in animation
