= Eagle: The Making of an Asian-American President =

Japanese manga series by Kaiji Kawaguchi

- Cover of the first volume

イーグル (Īguru)
- Genre: Political thriller
- Manga
- Written by: Kaiji Kawaguchi
- Published by: Shogakukan
- English publisher: NA: Viz Media
- Magazine: Big Comic
- Original run: 1997 – 2001
- Volumes: 11
- Adaptation
- The President (2010 TV series)

Eagle: The Making of an Asian-American President (Japanese: イーグル, Hepburn: Īguru) is a Japanese political manga series written and illustrated by Kaiji Kawaguchi. It was serialized in Big Comic, a seinen manga magazine published by Shogakukan, and collected into eleven tankōbon volumes. Its plot, following a Japanese American senator as he runs for president of the United States, was thoroughly researched by Kawaguchi, including during several weeks of travel in the U.S. during the campaigns for the 2000 election.

== Plot ==
Eagle takes place during the 2000 presidential election. Some of the characters are entirely original, such as Senator Kenneth Yamaoka (D-NY) (ケネス・ヤマオカ, Kenesu Yamaoka) and the series protagonist, Japanese journalist Takashi Jo (城 鷹志, Jō Takashi). Others are fictionalized depictions of real people, such as campaign advisor George Tuck (based on Dick Tuck), Democratic Vice-president Al Noah (based on Al Gore), and the current president Bill Clayton (ビル・クライトン, Biru Kuraiton; based on Bill Clinton), who hails from Arkansas, has faced multiple scandals, and has a politically ambitious wife named Ellery Clayton (エラリー・クライトン, Erarī Kuraiton; based on Hillary Clinton).

== Characters ==
=== Main cast ===
==== Takashi Jo ====
A reporter for the Maicho Shimbun, Jo is invited out-of-the-blue to cover Senator Yamaoka on the campaign trail, just days after losing his mother Tomiko to an apparent gas leak. Despite having little to no experience covering political stories, Jo embarks for the United States, where he soon finds out that Yamaoka is actually his father.

==== Kenneth Jukichi Yamaoka ====
A junior Democratic senator from New York, Yamaoka is on the verge of becoming the first Asian-American president. He is a third-generation Japanese-American, and grew up in Washington State. Yamaoka is a Marine veteran, having served in the Vietnam War - during which he was briefly stationed in Okinawa, where he met and embarked on a brief relationship with Tomiko.

Yamaoka is currently married to Patricia Yamaoka (née Hampton, a patrician New England family), and is father to adopted daughter Rachel, and natal son Alex. Additionally, he is secretly the father of Takashi Jo, one of the reasons he invites Takashi to cover his presidential campaign.

=== Jo and Yamaoka's family ===
==== Tomiko Jo ====
Takashi's mother and a bartender by profession, she died in an apparent gas leak just before the story's setting.

== Media ==
=== Publication ===
The series was originally serialized from 1997 to 2001 in the Japanese anthology Big Comic, published by Shogakukan. In an interview with The Los Angeles Times, Kawaguchi revealed that he was inspired by watching the 1993 documentary The War Room. The chapters were collected into eleven tankōbon volumes between February 26, 1998, and April 26, 2001.

From 2000 to 2002, Viz Media published the English translation in monthly 100-page issues and then in five collected volumes. The series has also been published in France by J'ai lu (up until volume 8), Casterman (the complete 11 volume series) and Panini Manga (deluxe edition), in Germany by Egmont Manga & Anime, and in Indonesia by Level Comic.

==== English volumes ====
1. 416 pages, ISBN 1-56931-475-6
2. 424 pages, ISBN 1-56931-476-4
3. 416 pages, ISBN 1-56931-551-5
4. 512 pages, ISBN 1-56931-639-2
5. 600 pages, ISBN 1-59116-007-3

=== Adaptation ===
A live-action South Korean television drama adaptation, directed by Kim Hyung-Il, written by Son Young-mok, and starring Choi Soo-jong, premiered in December 2010.

== Reception ==
Eagle was nominated for five Eisner Awards, including Best New Series, Best Continuing Series, Best Writer/Artist, and Best U.S. Edition of Foreign Material in 2001, and again in 2002 for Best U.S. Edition of Foreign Material. Writer Warren Ellis called it "A wild tangle of sex and secrets and hate and Machiavellian intrigue. It's Primary Colors in a really bad mood."
