= Révolution (comic) =

- The cover of the first volume of the graphic novel

Publication information
- Publisher: Actes Sud
- Publication date: 2019 –

Creative team
- Written by: Florent Grouazel and Younn Locard
- Artist(s): Florent Grouazel and Younn Locard

Révolution is a series of comic books by Florent Grouazel and Younn Locard dealing with the events of the French Revolution. The two authors are both writers and artists for the series. The series is planned to have 1000 pages.

== Publication history ==
The first volume, titled Liberté (Liberty) was published in January 2019, and won the Angoulême International Comics Festival Prize for Best Album this year. The series was initially planned as three volumes, but the second volume has been split in two, the first volume, published in January 2023, titled Égalité - Livre 1 (Egality - Volume 1).

== Volumes ==
- Révolution - Liberté (January 2019)
- Révolution - Egalité - livre 1 (January 2023)
- Révolution - Egalité - livre 2
- Révolution - Ou la Mort

== See also ==
- French Revolution
- Angoulême International Comics Festival Prize for Best Album
