= Landis Blair =

American illustrator and comics artist (born 1983)

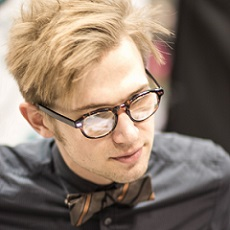
- Landis Blair at the 2016 Chicago Comic & Entertainment Expo
- Born: Peter Landis Blair; September 4, 1983 (age 43); Waukegan, Illinois, U.S.
- Education: School of the Art Institute of Chicago
- Known for: Illustration, Writing
- Notable work: The Hunting Accident; The Envious Siblings; Vers le Sud
- Awards: 2021 Fauve d'Or; 2018 Excellence in Graphic Literature Awards; 2020 Quai des Bulles prize 2021 Grand prix des lectrices de Elle
- Website: Official website

Landis Blair (born Peter Landis Blair; 4 September 1983) is an American illustrator and comics artist. He illustrated the graphic novel The Hunting Accident and later wrote and illustrated The Envious Siblings, The Night Tent and Vers le Sud. He is also known for his work with Caitlin Doughty and as a member of The Order of the Good Death.

== Work ==
Blair's heavily crosshatched drawings and dark storytelling are influenced by Edward Gorey. The New York Times referred to his work on The Hunting Accident as drawn with "a graphomaniacal fervor".

=== Books ===
Landis Blair came to prominence in 2017 with his 420 pages of illustration for The Hunting Accident: A True Story of Crime and Poetry, written by David Carlson. The same year saw the publication of Caitlin Doughty's second book, From Here to Eternity, illustrated by Blair.

He both wrote and illustrated The Envious Siblings: And Other Morbid Nursery Rhymes for publication by Norton in 2019. This was followed by The Night Tent for Holiday House in 2023.

Vers le Sud ("Towards the South") was published in France by Les Éditions Martin de Halleux in 2023. It is a 32-page silent comic story. 2023 also saw the publication of Chris Woodyard's A is for Arsenic: an A-Z of Victorian Death, illustrated by Blair.

Blair also writes and publishes some of his own books under the publishing label Sastergoodment Press.

=== Exhibitions ===
- Muskegon Museum of Art. Undying Traditions: Memento Mori at Muskegon Museum of Art, Group show, 2019.
- Indiana University Northwest. The Hunting Accident: First Chapter, Original artwork from the graphic novel, Solo show, 2019.
- Northern Illinois University. Mirth and Mayhem: Landis Blair Selections of Drawings and Books, 2021.
- Sideshow Gallery, Chicago. Thresholds: an exhibition of drawings by Landis Blair, 2023.
- Philippe Labaune Gallery, New York. Artist Spotlight: Landis Blair, 2023.
- Gallery 1619, Chicago. Recent Anxieties, 2025.
- Port Angeles Fine Arts Center, Port Angeles. Eternal Echoes (group show), 2026.

=== Other work ===
The foyer of an Art Deco apartment building in downtown Memphis contains an etched glass site-specific work by Landis Blair. It depicts a map of Memphis, historic locations, and the history of the building.

His illustrations have appeared in print and online magazines and have been used for commercial art such as t-shirt and tote bag designs. He has collaborated with Field Notes and is well known for his memorial pet portraits.

== Awards and honors ==
- 2012 Grand Prize winner of The New Yorker's Eustace Tilley contest.
- 2018 Best in Adult Books at the inaugural Excellence in Graphic Literature awards for The Hunting Accident (with David L. Carlson).
- 2020 Quai des Bulles prize for The Hunting Accident.
- 2021 Fauve d'Or prize at the 2021 Festival international de la bande dessinée d'Angoulême for The Hunting Accident (with David L. Carlson).
- 2021 Grand prix des lectrices de Elle (with David L. Carlson) for The Hunting Accident.
- 2024 National Cartoonist Society Reuben Award for Book Illustration (nominated)

== Athletic Achievements ==
Landis is a centurion.

== Personal life ==
Landis rides a unicycle.
