= Jean-Pierre Autheman =

French comic book author (1946–2020)

- Born: 17 December 1946; Arles, France
- Died: 26 October 2020 (aged 73); Arles, France
- Occupation: Comic Book Author

Jean-Pierre Autheman (17 December 1946 – 26 October 2020) was a French comic book author and teacher in art, computer graphics school. He was also occasionally a novelist, illustrator, and cartoonist.

== Biography ==
After studying arts and letters, Autheman moved from Arles to Paris to try his luck as a designer. He made his debut in 1972 with the self-published comic strip Mémoires d'un Gardien de Phare. His friend, Georges Wolinski, who worked for Hara-Kiri, helped him publish comics in Charlie Mensuel, L'Écho des savanes, and Pilote. At the end of the 1970s, he became involved in the Rencontres d'Arles.

In 1979, Autheman created the characters Condor and Vic Valence, whose first title, Une nuit chez Tennessee won Best Album at the Angoulême International Comics Festival in 1987. He then began writing comics with more scarcity, with his last written comic coming in 2006, titled Zambada and illustrated by Éric Maltaite. He then became a professor of narrative image and screenplay design at the École des Nouvelles Images (formerly Supinfocom) in Avignon.

Jean-Pierre Autheman died in Arles on 26 October 2020, at the age of 73. According to Guy Vidal, Autheman was a "great screenwriter". Pierre Desproges complimented his warm character.

== Publications ==
=== Newspaper Comic Strips ===
- Escale à Nacaro in Charlie Mensuel (1978–1979)
- Les Déserteurs (1981–1983)
- Condor in Pilote
1. L'Otage (1982-1983)
2. Alerte en Afrique (1984)
3. L'Empire du Pacifique (1986–1987)
4. Le Testament de Marius Casanova (1989)
- Vic Valence in Circus
1. Une nuit chez Tennessee (1985–1986)
2. La Passagère silencieuse (1987)
- Le Voyage du bâteleur : La Dame de Dorfgrau (1987)

=== Comic Strip Albums ===
- Mémoires d'un gardien de phare (1974)
- Les Déserteurs (1983)
- Condor
1. Escale à Nacaro (1979)
2. L'Otage (1984)
3. Alerte en Afrique (1985)
4. L'Empire du Pacifique (1987)
5. Le Testament de Marius Casanova (1990)
6. Opérette marseillaise (1993)
7. Le Rendez-vous de Yu-Moon (1998)
- Les Sirènes de Balarin (1984)
- Ma zone (1984)
- Vic Valence
1. Une nuit chez Tennessee (1986)
2. La Passagère silencieuse (1987)
3. La Lune des fous (1989)
- Le Voyage du bâteleur t. 1 : La Dame de Dorfgrau (1987)
- Le Filet de Saint-Pierre (1992)
- L'Arlésien (1992)
- Place des hommes (1993)
- Qu'est-ce qu'elles ont les filles? (1993)
- Le Pet du Diable (1994)
- Dérangez-pas mémé (1995)
- La Passe du manchot (1996)
- Exotissimo (1997)
- Les Nanas (1998)
- L'ombre de Moi-Même (1999)
- Le Passage de Vénus (1999–2000)
- Zambada
1. Les Vagues de la mer (2001)
2. La Maison de l'ange (2002)
3. Menace sur Zambada (2003)
4. Double jeu (2006)
- Le Trésor d'Alazar (2001)

=== Co-Authorship ===
- Fripons (Collectif Humanos) (1992)
- Demain l'an 3000 (1999)
- En images et en bandes dessinées (2001)

=== Novels ===
- L'Homme du général (1990)

=== Recipe Book ===
- Cinquante Omelettes (2001)

== Awards ==
- Best Album at the Angoulême International Comics Festival for Une nuit chez Tennessee (1987)
- Prix Jacques-Lob (1994)
