= Little Ego =

Creative team
- Created by: Vittorio Giardino

Little Ego is a comic strip written and drawn by Vittorio Giardino, as well as the title character of the strip. Little Ego first appeared in Glamour International Magazine #12 (January 1984).

== Publication history ==
After its debut in Glamour International Magazine, Little Ego appeared regularly in the Italian magazine Comic Art from July 1985 to November 1989. It also appeared in the Swedish magazine Epix from 1986 to 1990 These were later reprinted in American magazines Heavy Metal between 1993 and 1994 and Penthouse. In Spain, Little Ego was published by Norma Editorial. The strips from Comic Art were later published in a 1989 trade paperback edition (ISBN 978-1561630943).

It later appeared in a 1997 encyclopedia and a 2009 Italian collection.

== Story overview ==
Little Ego is an adult-oriented, erotic parody of the classic Little Nemo comics. The main character, called Ego, is a woman seemingly in her middle twenties. As in Little Nemo, each story is about her having a dream, and she wakes up in the last panel. Whereas Little Nemo talked to his mother after waking up, Little Ego wonders what she will tell her psychoanalyst.

Every story in the Little Ego comic book involves erotic imagery, with Ego appearing half-naked or fully naked in at least one point. She has sexual intercourse with men, with other women, and even with plants and animals.
