= Baru (comics) =

French cartoonist (born 1947)

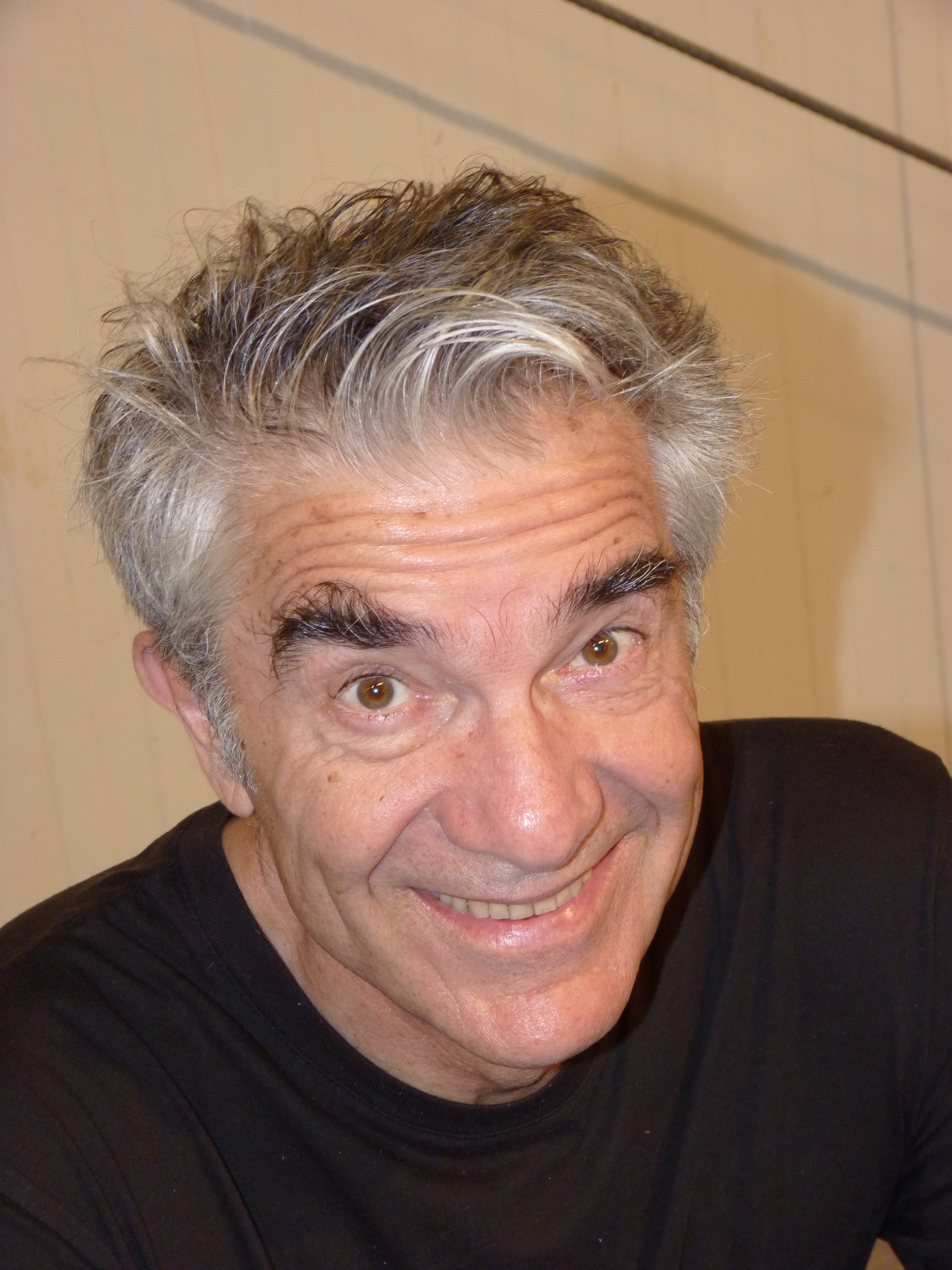
- Baru at the 2012 Bédécibels Festival, in Antibes.
- Born: Hervé Barulea; July 29, 1947 (age 79); Thil, Meurthe-et-Moselle, France
- Education: University of Lorraine
- Occupation: Comics artist
- Honours: Grand Prix de la ville d'Angoulême (2010)

Hervé Barulea, known as Baru (born 29 July 1947), is a French comics author of Italian descent. His works deal mainly about the working class, particularly in the Italian immigrant community in Lorraine.

== Life and career ==
Barulea was born in Thil and grew up in Villerupt (department of Meurthe-et-Moselle), the son of an Italian immigrant metalworker and a Breton mother. Baru graduated in sports at the University of Lorraine and became a physical education teacher.

Encouraged by editor Étienne Robial, Baru debuted in comics in 1982, making stories for the magazine Pilote. In 1985, he received the best French-language debut album award at the Angoulême Festival, with the first volume of Quéquette Blues.He would be awarded again at Angoulême in 1996, in the Best Album category, with L'Autoroute du Soleil.

In 2006 he was awarded the Grand Boum lifetime achievement prize at the Blois comics festival and in 2010 he won the Grand Prix de la Ville d'Angoulême.

== Works ==
- Quéquette blues, Dargaud, (3 volumes collected in a complete edition by Albin Michel in 1991 with the title of Roulez Jeunesse!, released by Casterman in 2005)
  - Part. Ouane, 1984
  - Part. Tou, 1986
  - Part. Tri, 1986
- La Piscine de Micheville, Dargaud, 1985 (reissued by Albin Michel, 1993; then by Les Rêveurs, 2009, expanded edition)
  - English edition: The Swimming pool of Micheville, Les Reveurs, 2015 ISBN 979-1091476591
- The Communion of the Mino, Futuropolis, 1985
- Long live class!, Futuropolis, 1987
- Cours, camarade!, Albin Michel, 1988
- Le Chemin de l'Amérique, story by Jean-Marc Thévenet, Albin Michel, 1990 (reissued by Casterman in 1998)
  - English edition: Road to America, Drawn and Quarterly, 2002. ISBN 978-1896597522
- L'Autoroute du soleil,, Casterman, 1995 (reissued in two volumes in 2002)
- Sur la route encore, Casterman, 1997
- Bonne année, Casterman, 1998
- Les Années Spoutnik, Casterman
  - Le Pénalty, 1999
  - C'est moi le chef!, 2000
  - Bip bip !, 2002
  - Boncornards Têtes-de-lard!, 2003
- L'Enragé, Aire Libre collection, Dupuis
  - Volume 1, 2004
  - Volume 2, 2006
- Pauvres Zhéros, adaptation and guide by Pierre Pelot, Rivages/Casterman/Noir, 2008 - (Official selection of the Angoulême Festival 2009)
- Noir, Éditions Casterman, 2009
- Fais péter les basses, Bruno !, Futuropolis, 2010
- Ici et là, Les Rêveurs, 2012 (ISBN 978-2-37894010-2)
- Le Silence de Lounès, drawings by Pierre Place, coll. Univers d'auteurs, Éditions Casterman, 2013
- Canicule, adaptation of a novel by Jean Vautrin (1982), Éditions Casterman, 2013
- The Four Roses, drawings by Jano, Futuropolis, 2015
- Baru : Catalogue déraisonnable pour une exposition fantasmée, Le Pythagore, 2019 (ISBN 978-2-37231-069-7)
- Bella Ciao, Futuropolis :
1. Uno, 2020 (ISBN 9782754811699)
2. Due, 2021 (ISBN 9782754831420)
3. Tre, 2022 (ISBN 9782754833776)
- Rodina, Futuropolis, 2023 (ISBN 978-2-7548-3616-6)
- Rock'N'Roll, Futuropolis :
1. Salauds de baby-boomers, 2026 (ISBN 978-2-7548-4789-6)
