= Jason (cartoonist) =

Norwegian cartoonist

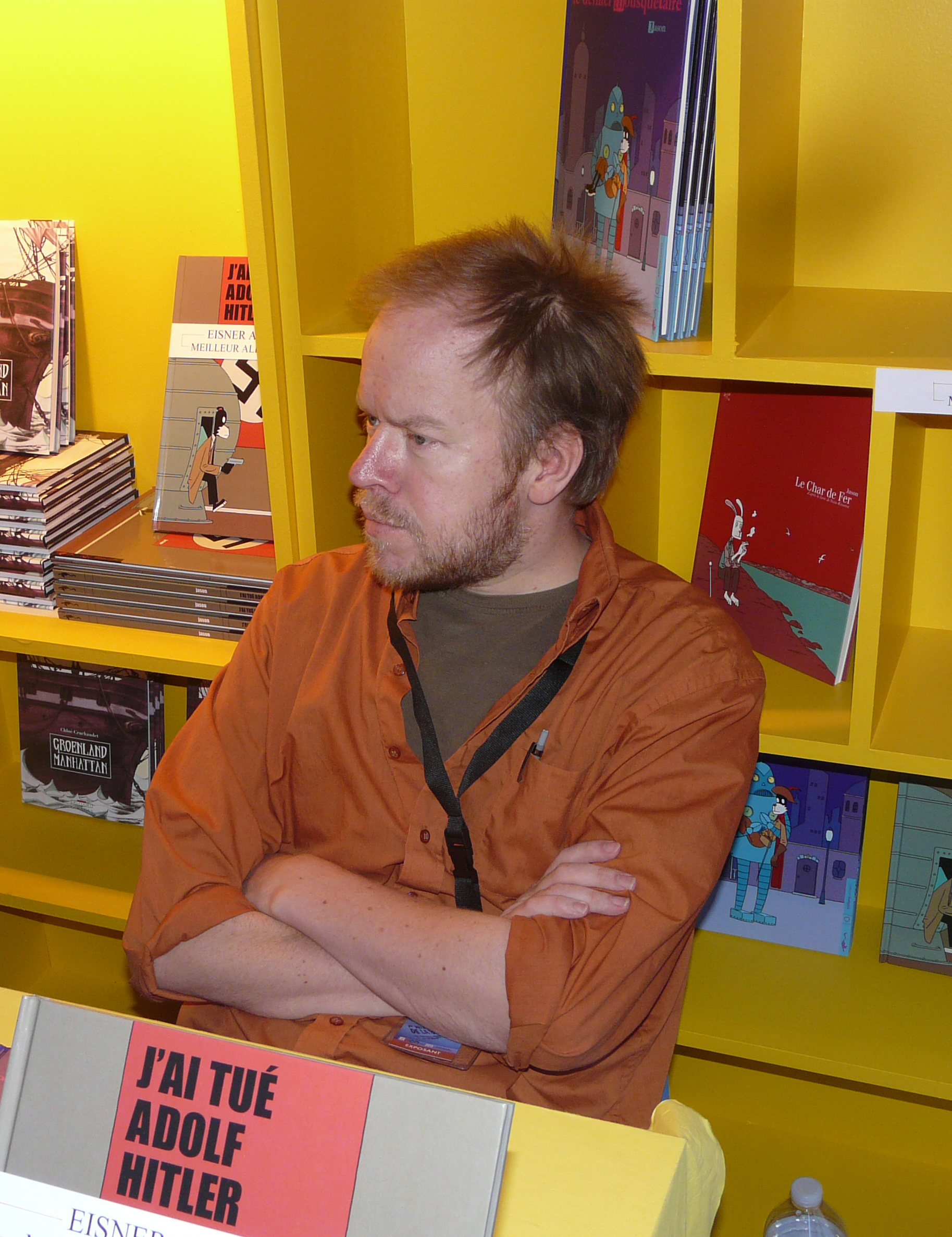
- Jason in 2008 at a comic convention in France.
- Born: John Arne Sæterøy; 16 August 1965 (age 61) Molde, Norway
- Areas: artist, writer
- Notable works: Hey, Wait... Sshhhh! Meow, Baby! The Left Bank Gang
- Awards: full list

John Arne Sæterøy (born 16 August 1965), better known by the pen name Jason, is a Norwegian cartoonist, known for his sparse drawing style and silent, anthropomorphic animal characters.

He was nominated for two Ignatz Awards (2000: Outstanding Story and Outstanding Series, 2001: Outstanding Story and Outstanding Series), received praise in Time, and won the Harvey Award for best new talent in 2002, as well as several Eisner Awards.

== Biography ==
Jason was born in Molde, and had his work published for the first time in 1981 in the Norwegian comics magazine KonK, to which he contributed several short stories during its lifespan. In 1989, he was admitted to Norway's National Academy of the Arts, where he studied graphic design and illustration. He won the Norwegian Comics Association award in 1991 for the short work pervo.

In 1995, Jason published his first graphic novel, Lomma full av regn (Pocket Full of Rain), for which he won the Sproing Award. In 1997, he started making Mjau Mjau, a semi-regular comic book featuring nothing but his own works. In 2001, he was once again awarded a Sproing, this time for Mjau Mjau 10. Since 2002, Jason has concentrated on making graphic novels.

Jason has lived in Denmark, Belgium, the U.S., and France. Since 2007, Jason has been living in Montpellier, and his recent graphic novels have been initially published in French.

As Jason's exposure has increased, his comics have been published outside of Norway, in Sweden, Denmark, Finland, France, Germany, Italy, the Netherlands, Poland, Russia, Slovakia, Spain, Switzerland, Brazil, and the U.S. His American publisher is Fantagraphics.

== Style ==
Jason's work is usually drawn in a minimalist, clean style, influenced by Hergé's ligne claire. His protagonists are usually anthropomorphic animals and/or B-movie monsters.

Jason's comics frequently refer to other works. For example, Tell Me Something is inspired by Buster Keaton's movies, Frankenstein's Monster and related characters appear in You Can't Get There From Here, and fictionalized versions of Ernest Hemingway and other writers are the protagonists of The Left Bank Gang.

== Bibliography of English publications ==
Title	Year	ISBN	Notes
Hey, Wait...	2001	ISBN 1-56097-463-X	
Sshhhh!	2002	ISBN 1-56097-497-4	
The Iron Wagon	2003	ISBN 1-56097-541-5	Graphic novel adaptation of Norwegian author Stein Riverton's 1908 novel of the same name, which has yet to be translated into English.
Tell Me Something	2004	ISBN 1-56097-566-0	
You Can't Get There from Here	2004	ISBN 1-56097-598-9	
Why Are You Doing This?	2005	ISBN 1-56097-655-1	
Meow, Baby!	2006	ISBN 1-56097-695-0	
The Left Bank Gang	2006	ISBN 1-56097-742-6	
The Living and the Dead	2007	ISBN 1-56097-794-9	
I Killed Adolf Hitler	2007	ISBN 1-56097-828-7	
The Last Musketeer	2008	ISBN 978-1-56097-889-3	
Pocket Full of Rain	2008	ISBN 978-1-56097-934-0	
Low Moon	2009	ISBN 978-1-60699-155-8	Includes: Emily Says Hello; Low Moon; &; Early Film Noir; and You Are Here
Almost Silent	2010	ISBN 978-1-60699-315-6	Reprints: Tell Me Something; You Can't Get There From Here; Meow, Baby!; and The Living and the Dead
Werewolves of Montpellier	2010	ISBN 978-1-60699-359-0	
What I Did	2010	ISBN 978-1-60699-414-6	Reprints: Hey, Wait...; Sshhhh!; and The Iron Wagon
Isle of 100,000 Graves	2011	ISBN 978-1-60699-442-9	Contributor: Fabien Vehlmann
Jason Conquers America	2011	No ISBN	Published to mark 10 years of Jason being published in America, contains interviews and previously unpublished strips.
Athos in America	2012	ISBN 978-1-60699-478-8	Includes: The Smiling Horse; A Cat From Heaven; The Brain That Wouldn't Virginia Woolf; Tom waits On The Moon; So Long, Mary Jane; and Athos in America
Lost Cat	2013	ISBN 978-1-60699-642-3	
If You Steal	2015	ISBN 978-160-6-99854-0	Includes: If You Steal; Karma Chameleon; Waiting For Bardot; Lorena Valazquez; New Face; Moondance; Night of the Vampire Hunter; Polly Wants a Cracker; The Thrill is Gone; Ask Not; and Nothing
On the Camino	2017	ISBN 978-168-3-96021-8	
O Josephine!	2019	ISBN 978-168-3-96210-6	Includes: The Wicklow Way; L. Cohen: A Life; The Diamonds; and O Josephine!
Good Night, Hem	2021	ISBN 978-168-3-96461-2	
Upside Dawn	2022	ISBN 978-168-3-96652-4	Includes: Woman, Man, Bird; Perec, PI; I Remember; Vampyros Dyslexicos; Seal VII; The Prisoner in the Castle; Crime and Punishment; Ulysses; Ionesco; What Rhymes With Giallo?; The City of Light, Forever; Who Will Kill the Spider?; One Million and One Years B.C.; EC Come...; ...EC Go; From Outer Space; and Etc.
Death in Trieste	2025	ISBN 979-887-5-00125-3	Includes: The Magritte Affair; Death in Trieste; and Sweet Dreams

== Awards ==
- 1995: Sproing Award, for Lomma full av regn
- 2000: Sproing Award, for Mjau Mjau 10: Si meg en ting
- 2000: Urhunden Prize for best translated graphic novel, for Vänta lite...
- 2002: Inkpot Award
- 2002: Harvey Award, Best New Talent, for Hey, Wait...
- 2005: Brage Prize, Open Class for La meg vise deg noe...
- 2007: Eisner Award, Best U.S. Edition of International Material, for The Left Bank Gang
- 2008: Eisner Award, Best U.S. Edition of International Material, for I Killed Adolf Hitler

Awards
Preceded by Arne Lygre	Recipient of the Brage Prize, open class 2005	Succeeded by Kathinka Blichfeldt, Tor Gunnar Heggem, Ellen Larsen
