= Laura Pérez Granel =

Spanish comic illustrator and writer (born 1983)

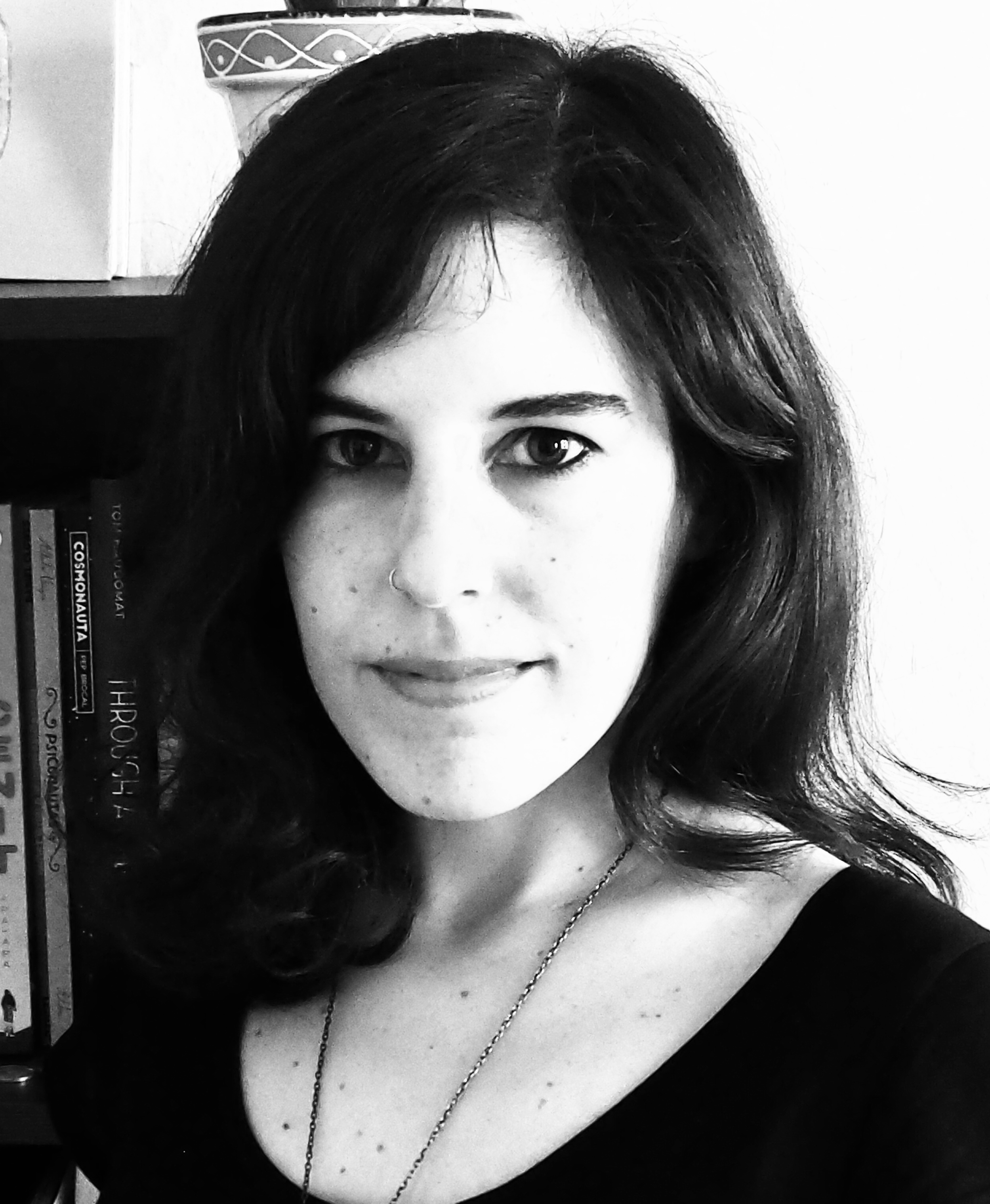
- Born: 1983 (age 42–43); Valencia, Spain
- Education: Real Academia de Bellas Artes de San Carlos de Valencia; Escuela de Bellas Artes de Barcelona
- Occupations: Cartoonist and illustrator
- Website: https://www.lauraperez.net/

Laura Pérez Granel (born 1983) is a Spanish comic illustrator and writer. In 2020, she won the Critical Eye Awards by Radio Nacional de España for her work Ocultos. In 2022, she was nominated for an Emmy Award for the title credits for the series Only Murders in the Building, for which she also created the drawings and mural made by Selena Gomez's character Mabel.

== Biography ==
Pérez graduated from Real Academia de Bellas Artes de San Carlos de Valencia in 2010, after taking various courses abroad thanks to the Erasmus Programme, Promoe, and SICUE. While abroad, she studied at the School of Fine Arts of Rennes, Alberta University of the Arts, and the School of Fine Arts in Barcelona.

Peréz's first graphic novel, Naúfragos was published in 2016 together with screenwriter Pablo Monforte and went on to win the X Premio Internacional de Novela Gráfica Fnac-Salamandra Graphic award. It is a graphic novel about nostalgia set in 1981 Madrid during La Movida Madrileña and in 1991 Barcelona. The work was translated into French in 2018 with Des ronds and into English in 2021 with Dark Horse Comics as Castaways.

In 2019, she published her first solo work Ocultos, a paranormal graphic novel about the mystery of reality, with Astiberri Ediciones. That same year, the work received the Award for the Best National Album at the Splash Sagunt, the comic festival in Valencian Community which is celebrated in Sagunto. In 2020, she was honored with the Critical Eye Awards by Radio Nacional de España for her poetic style, ability to portray estrangement, the delicate, and the dark. Also in 2020, the Asociación Española de Fantasía, Ciencia Ficción y Terror (AEFCFT) awarded Ocultos the Premio Ignotus for the best national comic.

Pérez works as an illustrator for national media like El País, international media like The Washington Post, The Wall Street Journal and The Boston Globe, and magazines Vanity Fair and National Geographic. She has also completed commissions for organizations like the World Health Organization. In 2021, she created the poster announcing the twelfth Navarra Comic Fair and the Eighth Splash Sagunt.

Pérez appears in the fourth volume of Illustration Now! by Taschen, has been included Lunwerg's list of the best illustrators, and, in 2019, was included in the book Reinas de la ilustración española del siglo XXI (transl. Queens of Spanish illustration in the 21st century) by Cristian Campos for Norma Editorial.

In 2021, Pérez began to work with the American studio Elastic in creating the titles for Only Murders in the Building. Pérez also created the work by Mabel, the character portrayed by Selena Gomez. This work was nominated for an Emmy Award in 2022.

== Work ==
=== Graphic novels ===
- 2016 – Naúfragos. With Pablo Monforte. Salamandra Graphic. ISBN 9788416131266.
- 2019 – Ocultos. Astiberri Ediciones. ISBN 9788417575076.
- 2021 – Tótem. Astiberri Ediciones. ISBN 9788418215544.
- 2022 – Espanto. Astiberri Ediciones. ISBN 9788418909351.
- 2024 – Nocturnos. Astiberri Ediciones. ISBN 9788419670540.

=== Illustrated albums ===
- 2019 – Secrets de Sorcières. La Martinière Jeunesse (in French).
- 2020 – Los secretos de las brujas. Written by Julie Légère and Elsa Whyte. Errata Naturae. ISBN 978-84-17800-67-3.
- 2020 – Sirènes de Legénde. La Martinière Jeunesse (in French).
- 2021 – Secrets de Vampires. La Martinière Jeunesse (in French).
- 2021 – Sirenas de leyenda. Written by Rémi Giordano and Olivia Godat. Errata Naturae. ISBN 978-84-17800-93-2.

== Awards ==
- 2015: Valencia Crea Award, Empatía
- 2016: Internacional de Novela Gráfica Fnac-Salamandra Graphic, Naúfragos (written with Pablo Monforte)
- 2020: Critical Eye Awards, Radio Nacional de España, Ocultos
- 2020: Premio Ignotus, Asociación Española de Fantasía, Ciencia Ficción y Terror, Ocultos
- 2020: Award for the Best National Album, Splash Sagunt (tied with Augustín Ferrer)
- 2022: Lorna Award, Celsius 232, Tótem
- 2022: Primetime Emmy Award for Outstanding Main Title Design, Only Murders in the Building
