= Patrick McCay =

American painter

Patrick McCay (born 1952) is an Irish-born, Scottish/American painter currently residing in the U.S. state of New Hampshire. He is currently Chair of the Visual Arts Department at the New Hampshire Institute of Art.

== Early life ==
McCay earned an undergraduate degree in fine art and a master's degree in painting from the Glasgow School of Art in Scotland (1970–76). He completed his Post- Graduate Certificate in Education (with distinction) from Saint Andrews College in Glasgow. He also holds a second Master of Fine Arts (M.F.A.) degree from Notre Dame University (1988) in South Bend, Indiana.

== Career ==
McCay's paintings combine abstract and figurative elements. They reflect the influence of the Scottish and German expressionists, American abstract expressionists, as well as that of the Bay Area Painters.

McCay has participated in many individual and group exhibitions and is the recipient of numerous grants and awards including the Andrew Carnegie Trust Award, a Scottish Arts Council traveling scholarship and the David Carghil Award.

He has exhibited at the London Royal Academy, the Royal Glasgow Institute of the Fine Arts, Edinburgh International Festival, Edinburgh Royal Academy, The London Institute, 9Arte Gallery in Lisbon, Portugal, "Arthaus 11," Sydney College of the Arts, Millbrook Gallery, Chace-Randall Gallery, as well as in individual and group exhibitions in New York City, Chicago, Atlanta, and Lisbon, Savannah, and Boston.

His work has been featured in Design New England and is included in the public and private collections of the Royal Bank of Scotland, Baldwin Piano Company, HRH Princess Margaret, Zurich Insurance Group, the Georgia State Art Collection, and Westin Hotels & Resorts.

McCay has taught at the Savannah College of Art and Design (SCAD) in Savannah, Georgia, the College for Creative Studies in Detroit, Michigan, and the School of Visual Arts (SVA) in New York City.
