= Mezzo soprano (disambiguation) =

A mezzo soprano is a classical female singing voice.

Mezzo soprano may also refer to:

- Mezzo Soprano (horse) (2000–2013), American-bred Thoroughbred racehorse
- Mezzo-soprano clef, C-clef on the second line of the stave
- Mezzo-soprano saxophone, instrument in the saxophone family
