= Corona (comics) =

Corona, in comics, may refer to:

- Corona, an alias used by the Eternal Thena
- Corona, a Marvel Comics character and member of The Initiative-incarnation of The Order
- Corona, a mutant from the alternate future of Here Comes Tomorrow

== See also ==
- Corona (disambiguation)
