= Shaun Tan =

Australian artist, writer and film maker (born 1974)

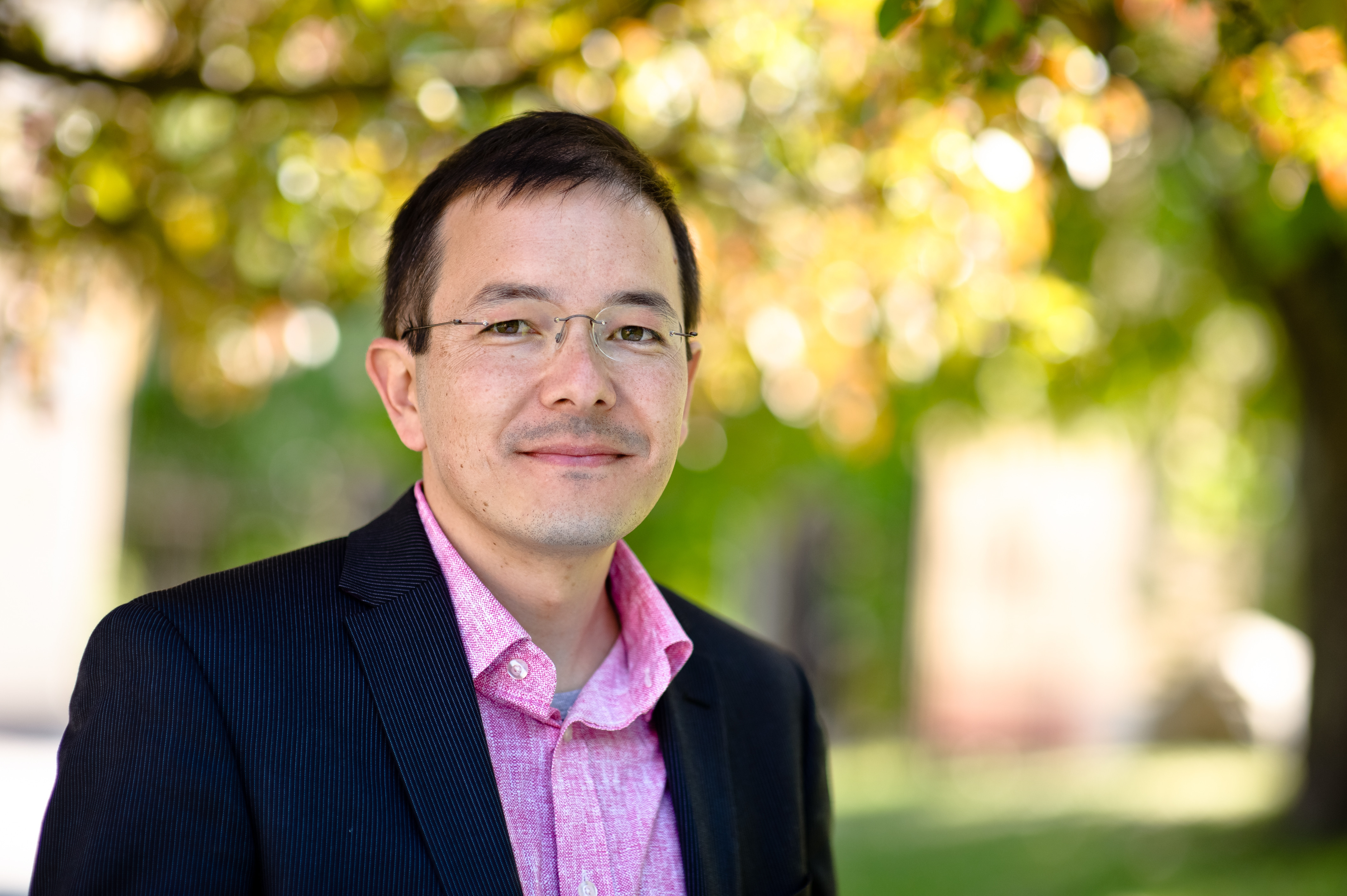
- Tan in 2011
- Born: January 15, 1974 (age 52); Fremantle, Western Australia, Australia
- Notable work: The Red Tree; The Lost Thing; The Arrival; Cicada
- Website: shauntan.net thebirdking.blogspot.com.au

Shaun Tan (born 15 January 1974) is an Australian artist, writer, and filmmaker. He is known for his graphic novel The Arrival (2006), which won several awards, and for his 2010 animated short film adaptation of the 2000 picture book he wrote and illustrated, The Lost Thing, for which he won an Academy Award. He has also written and illustrated many other books, including Tales From Outer Suburbia (2008) and The Red Tree (2001). Many of his works have won awards, including in the New South Wales Premier's Literary Awards and the Western Australian Premier's Book Awards, and many have been adapted for screen and stage.

== Early life and education ==
Shaun Tan was born on 15 January 1974 in Fremantle, Western Australia, to a Chinese Malaysian father and an Australian mother. He grew up in the northern suburbs of Perth.

As a boy, Tan spent time illustrating poems and stories and drawing dinosaurs, robots and spaceships. At school he was known as a talented artist. At the age of eleven, he became a fan of The Twilight Zone television series as well as books that bore similar themes. Tan cites Ray Bradbury as a favourite at this time. These stories led to Tan writing his own short stories. Of his effort at writing as a youth, Tan tells, "I have a small pile of rejection letters as testament to this ambition!" At the age of sixteen, Tan's first illustration appeared in the Australian magazine Aurealis in 1990.

Tan almost studied to become a geneticist, and enjoyed chemistry, physics, history and English while in high school as well as art and claimed that he did not really know what he wanted to do. During his university studies, Tan decided to move from academic studies to working as an artist.

Tan continued his education at the University of Western Australia where he studied Fine Arts, English Literature and History. While this was of interest to him, there was little practical work involved. In 1995, he graduated with a Bachelor of Arts.

== Career ==
=== Work process ===
Initially, Tan worked in black and white because the final reproductions would be printed that way. Some black and white mediums he used include pens, inks, acrylics, charcoal, scraperboard, photocopies, and linocuts. Tan's current colour works include multiple different colours. He uses a graphite pencil to make sketches on ordinary copy paper. The sketches are then reproduced numerous times with different versions varying with parts added or removed. Sometimes scissors are used for this purpose. The cut and paste collage idea in these early stages is often extend to the finished production with many of his illustrations using such materials as "glass, metal, cuttings from other books and dead insects".

Tan describes himself as a slow worker who revises his work many times along the way. He is interested in loss and alienation, and believes that children in particular react well to issues of natural justice. He feels he is "like a translator" of ideas, and is happy and flattered to see his work adapted and interpreted in film and music (such as by the Australian Chamber Orchestra). Tan draws from a large source of inspiration and cites many influences on his work.

Tan's work has been described as an "Australian vernacular" that is "at once banal and uncanny, familiar and strange, local and universal, reassuring and scary, intimate and remote, guttersnipe and sprezzatura. No rhetoric, no straining for effect. Never other than itself."

== Recognition and awards ==
In 2000, the Victorian Department of Language Literacy and Arts Education hosted Tan as illustrator/writer in residence for two weeks through a fellowship offered by the May Gibbs Children's Literature Trust. As part of the residency, Tan presented lectures and seminars at the University of Melbourne, met with individual students and staff, and visited two schools and conducted a research seminar.

The annual Shaun Tan Award for Young Artists is an art award sponsored by the City of Subiaco, which has been held since 2003. It is open to all Western Australian school children between 5 and 18 years. There are five award categories: three for primary school years and two for senior years, with prizes are donated by the council and other award sponsors presented to the top three entries in each category. A selection of the best entries are exhibited for a month in Subiaco Library, with the 2025 entries on display from 7 July to 3 August.

In 2010, Tan was awarded the Dromkeen Medal, presented by the State Library Victoria to those who have advanced children's literature in Australia.

In 2011, Tan won the 2011 Astrid Lindgren Memorial Award from the Swedish Arts Council, the biggest prize in children's literature, for his career contribution to "children's and young adult literature in the broadest sense".

=== Book awards ===
Individual book awards include:

1992
L. Ron Hubbard Illustrators of the Future Contest: First Australian to win
1993
Ditmar Award, Artwork, Nominated for Relics
1995
Ditmar Award, Professional Artwork, Winner for Aurealis and Eidolon
1996
Ditmar Award, Artwork, Winner for Eidolon Issue 19 (Cover)
1997
Ditmar Award, Professional Artwork, Nominated for artwork in Eidolon and the cover of The Stray Cat
1998
Crichton Award, Winner for The Viewer
Children's Book Council of Australia, Notable Book for The Viewer
Ditmar Award, Artwork/Artist, Nominated for The Viewer
Western Australian Premier's Book Awards, Children's Book, Shortlisted for The Playground
1999
Aurealis Conveners' Award for Excellence for The Rabbits
Children's Book Council of Australia, Notable Book for The Playground
Children's Book Council of Australia, Picture Book of the Year, Winner for The Rabbits
Ditmar Award, Australian Professional Artwork, Nominated for The Rabbits
Spectrum Gold Award for Book Illustration for The Rabbits
2000
APA Design Award for Memorial
Children's Book Council of Australia, Picture Book of the Year, Honour Book for Memorial
Ditmar Award, Artwork, Winner for The Coode St Review of Science Fiction
Spectrum Gold Award for Book Illustration
Western Australian Premier's Book Awards, Writing for Young Adults award, Shortlisted for Lost Thing
2001
Ditmar Award, Artwork, Winner for The Lost Thing
Children's Book Council of Australia, Picture Book of the Year, Honour Book for The Lost Thing
Western Australian Premier's Book Awards, Children's Books, Shortlisted for Red Tree
World Fantasy Award for Best Artist
2002
Children's Book Council of Australia, Picture Book of the Year, Honour Book for The Red Tree
New South Wales Premier's Literary Awards, Patricia Wrightson Prize for Children's Literature Winner for Red Tree
2006
Premier's Prize and Children's Books category winner in the Western Australian Premier's Book Awards for The Arrival
2007
Ditmar Award, Artwork, Nominated for The Arrival
Children's Book Council of Australia, Picture Book of the Year, Honour Book for The Lost Thing
World Fantasy Award for Best Artist
New South Wales Premier's Literary Awards, Community Relations Commission Award and Book of the Year for The Arrival
Children's Book Council of Australia, Picture Book of the Year for "The Arrival"
2008
Angoulême International Comics Festival Prize for Best Comic Book for Là où vont nos pères, the French edition of The Arrival
Hugo Award, Nominated for Best Related Book for The Arrival
Hugo Award, Nominated for Best Professional Artist (also in 2009 and 2010)
Western Australian Premier's Book Awards Young Adult category winner for Tales from Outer Suburbia
Boston Globe-Horn Book Award, Special Citation for The Arrival
Winner Locus Award for Best Illustrated and Art Book for The Arrival
2009
Ditmar Award, Artwork, Winner for Tales from Outer Suburbia
Children's Book Council of Australia, Picture Book of the Year, Honour Book for The Lost Thing
World Fantasy Award for Best Artist
2010
Adelaide Festival Awards for Literature, winner of the Children's Literature Award category and the South Australian Premier's Award for Tales from Outer Suburbia
Hugo Award, Best Professional Artist
2011
Academy Award, Won Best Short Film (Animated) for The Lost Thing
Ditmar Award, Artwork, Winner for The Lost Thing
Ditmar Award, Artwork, Nominated for Australis Imaginarium
Hugo Award, Best Professional Artist
Peter Pan Prize for the Swedish translation of The Arrival
Winner Locus Award for Best Artist
2012
Locus Award for Best Artist
2014
Ditmar Award, Artwork, Winner for Rules of Summer
Boston Globe-Horn Book Award, Picture Book Honor for Rules of Summer
2019
World Fantasy Award for Best Artist, Finalist:Children's Book Council of Australia, Picture Book of the Year, Winner for Cicada

2020

Kate Greenaway Medal, Winner for Tales from the Inner City

== Adaptations ==
- The Red Tree, a play based on Tan's book of the same name, was commissioned by the Queensland Performing Arts Centre.
- The Red Tree, a music performance created by new composer Michael Yezerski with Richard Tognetti; performed by the Australian Chamber Orchestra with the youth choir Gondwana Voices, and accompanied by images from the book.
- The Arrival. Images from this book were projected during a performance by the Australian Chamber Orchestra of conductor Richard Tognetti's arrangement of Shostakovich's String Quartet No. 15
- The Lost Thing has been adapted as an Oscar-winning animated short film.
- The Lost Thing inspired an album by Sydney band Lo-Tel, complete with artwork from the book.
- The Lost Thing has also been adapted as a play by the Jigsaw Theatre Company, a youth theatre company in Canberra. This was the main event for the National Gallery of Australia's Children Festival (Canberra) and at the Chookahs! Kids Festival (Melbourne) in 2006.
- The Lost Thing was the theme for the 2006 Chookahs! Kids Festival at The Arts Centre in Melbourne, with many different activities based on concepts from the book.
- The Arrival was adapted for the stage by Red Leap Theatre.
- The Arrival was again projected on a screen to an orchestral score, performed by Orkestra of the Underground with 18 pieces created by musician and composer Ben Walsh. This was performed in the Sydney Opera House , Melbourne Recital Centre, and Her Majesty's Theatre in Adelaide.
- The Rabbits was the basis for an opera of the same title by Kate Miller-Heidke which was premiered at the 2015 Perth International Arts Festival.
- An adaptation of the short story collection Tales of the Inner City is to be presented at a number of venues across Perth's CBD by the 2026 Perth Festival, supported by funding from the Creative Futures Fund. The "site-responsive theatrical adventure... part-performance, part-installation, and fully immersive" project is being produced by creatives from across the Asia Pacific region.

== Works ==
=== Books ===
==== As illustrator ====
- The Pipe, by James Moloney (1996)
- The Stray Cat, by Steven Paulsen (1996)
- The Doll, by Janine Burke (1997)
- The Half Dead, by Garry Disher (1997)
- The Viewer, written by Gary Crew (1997)
- The Rabbits, written by John Marsden (1998)
- The Hicksville Horror, by Nette Hilton (1999)
- The Puppet, by Ian Bone (1999)
- Memorial, written by Gary Crew (1999)
- Pretty Monsters by Kelly Link (2008)

==== As author and illustrator ====
- The Playground (1997)
- The Lost Thing (2000)
- The Red Tree (2001)
- The Arrival (2006)
- Tales from Outer Suburbia (2008)
- The Bird King and other sketches (2011)
- The Oopsatoreum: inventions of Henry A. Mintox, with the Powerhouse Museum (2012)
- Rules of Summer (2013)
- The Singing Bones (2016)
- Cicada (2018)
- Tales from the Inner City (2018)
- Dog (2020)
- Eric (2020)
- Creature (2022)
- Hometown (2026)

=== Installations ===
- The Tea Party (2002), a mural covering 24 square metres above bookshelves in the Children's Section of the Subiaco Public Library in Perth
