= Vittorio Giardino =

Italian comics artist (born 1946)

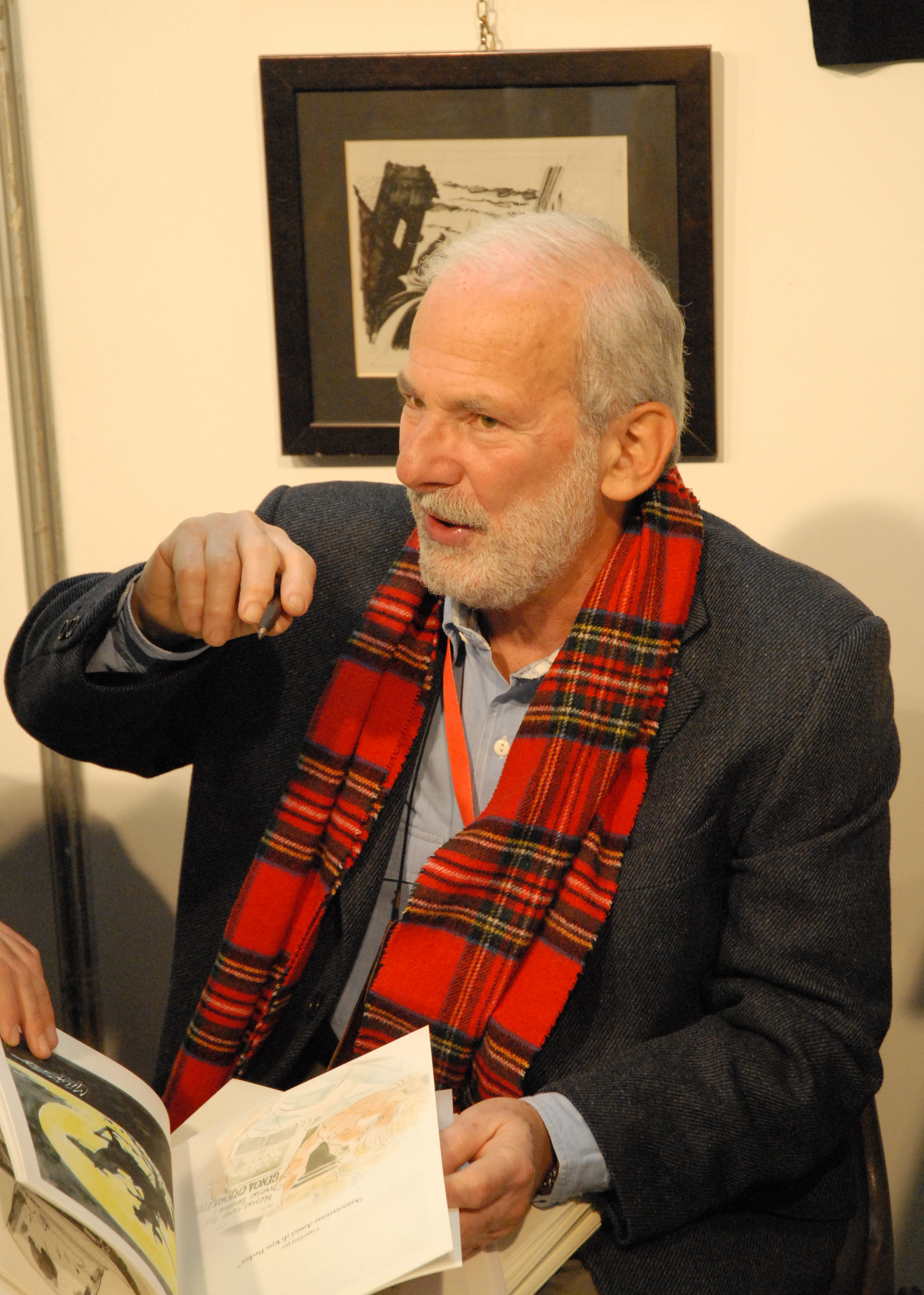
- Giardino at Lucca Comics & Games in 2010
- Born: December 24, 1946 (age 79) Bologna, Italy
- Area: Artist
- Notable works: Max Fridman; Little Ego; Sam Pezzo; Jonas Fink
- Awards: Full list

Vittorio Giardino (born December 24, 1946) is an Italian comic artist.

== Biography ==
Giardino was born in Bologna, where he graduated in electrical engineering in 1969. At the age of 30, he decided to leave his job and devote himself to comics. Two years later his first short story, "Pax Romana", was published in La Città Futura, a weekly magazine published by the Italian Communist Youth Federation and edited by Luigi Bernardi.

In 1982, Giardino created a new character: Max Fridman, an ex-secret agent involved in the political struggle in 1930s Europe. His first adventure, Hungarian Rhapsody was serialized in the first four issues of magazine Orient Express, bringing Giardino in the limelight of the international comic scene. Max Fridman adventures have been published in 18 countries. Some of the prizes the series won include Lucca Festival's Yellow Kid and Brussels' St. Michel.

Starting in 1984, Giardino produced a number of short stories for the Italian magazine Comic Art, where he introduced Little Ego, a young and sexy girl inspired by Winsor McCay's Little Nemo who stars in one-page dreamy erotic stories.

In 1991, Giardino created a new character, Jonas Fink for the Il Grifo magazine. Jonas is a young Jew in 1950's Prague whose father is arrested by the communist police. He and his mother have to cope with the discrimination and oppression of the Stalinist regime. The book, collected as A Jew in Communist Prague, won the Angoulême International Comics Festival Prize for Best Album for Best Foreign Comic in 1995 as well as a Harvey Award at WonderCon in 1999.

Giardino's detailed art style recalls the Belgian ligne claire, while his writing owes to hard-boiled and spy story authors like Dashiell Hammett and John le Carré.

== Awards ==
- 1982 Yellow Kid Award for Italian cartoonist
- 1995 Angoulême International Comics Festival Prize for Best Album for Best Foreign Comic for A Jew in Communist Prague
- 1999 Harvey Award for Best American Edition of Foreign Material for A Jew in Communist Prague
- 2000 U Giancu's Prize, International Cartoonists Exhibition
- 2008 Gran Guinigi, Lucca Comics & Games

== Works ==
- Pax Romana (1978)
- Da territori sconosciuti (1978)
- Ritorno felice (1978)
- La Predella di Urbino (1978)
- Encomiendero (1978)
- Un cattivo affare (1978)
- Sam Pezzo: Piombo di mancia (1979)
- Sam Pezzo: Nessuno ti rimpiangerà (1979)
- Sam Pezzo: Risveglio amaro (1980)
- Sam Pezzo: La trappola (1979)
- Sam Pezzo: Merry Christmas (1980)
- Sam Pezzo: L'ultimo colpo (1980)
- Sam Pezzo: Juke box (1981)
- Max Fridman: Rapsodia Ungherese (1982)
- Sam Pezzo: Shit City (1982)
- Sam Pezzo: Nightlife (1983)
- L'ultimatum (1983)
- C'era una volta in America (1984)
- A Carnevale... (1984)
- Circus (1984)
- A Nord-Est di Bamba Issa (1984)
- Max Fridman: La Porta d'Oriente (1985)
- Little Ego (1985-1989)
- Umido e Lontano (1987)
- Sotto falso nome (1987)
- Candidi segreti (1988)
- Safari (1988)
- Fuori stagione (1988)
- Quel brivido sottile (1988)
- Il ritrovamento di Paride (1988)
- Little Ego: Beduini (1989)
- La terza verità (1990)
- Jonas Fink: L'infanzia (1991)
- Vecchie volpi (1993)
- La rotta dei sogni (1993)
- Troppo onore (1993)
- Restauri (1992)
- Il maestro (2003)
- Isola del mito (2000)
- Jonas Fink: L'adolescenza (1998)
- Max Fridman: No Pasaràn (1999)
- Max Fridman: Rio de Sangre (2002)
- Max Fridman: Sin ilusión (2008)
- Jonas Fink. Il libraio di Praga (2018)
- Max Fridman: I cugini Meyer (2025)
