= Black Beast =

Black Beast, The Black Beast may refer to:

- Mario Roatta, World War II era Italian general
- Derrick Lewis, American MMA fighter
- Dark Beast, a Marvel Comics character and supervillain
- Kuroki Kemono, a BlazBlue non-player character
- Beast in Black, a Finnish-Greek-Hungarian heavy metal band
