= Nicolas de Crécy =

French cartoonist (b. 1966)

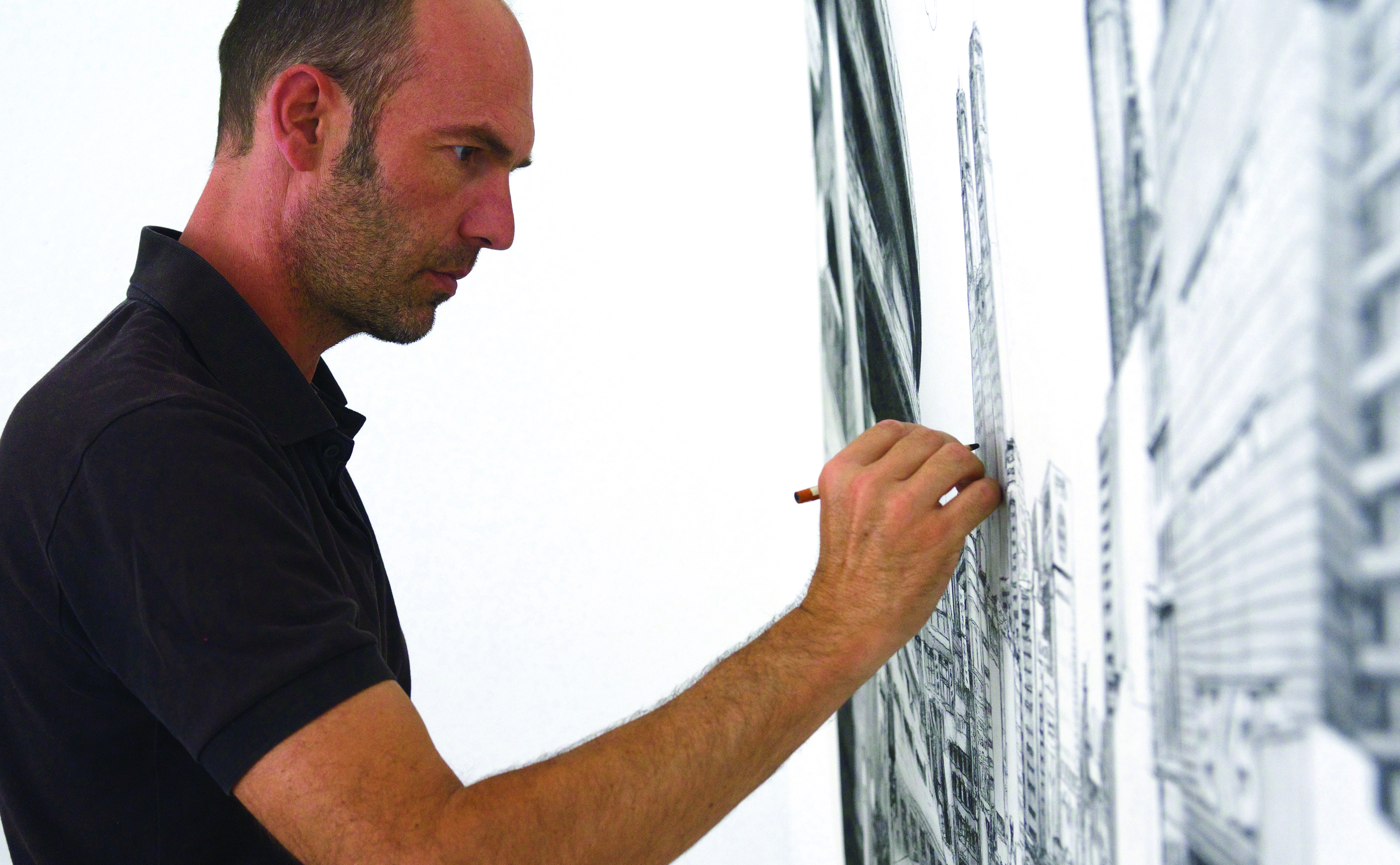
- Nicolas de Crécy (2015)
- Born: 29 September 1966 (age 59); Lyon, France
- Occupations: Artist, cartoonist, comic book writer
- Notable work: Foligatto, Léon la Came, Période Glaciaire
- Relatives: Étienne de Crécy (brother)
- Website: http://500dessins.blogspot.com.au/

Nicolas de Crécy (born 29 September 1966) is a French artist, cartoonist, and comic book writer. He was a co-author of Léon la Came, a work that won the Angoulême International Comics Festival Prize for Best Album in 1998.

== Career ==
Crécy was born in Lyon, France, and graduated from the Angoulême School of Art in 1987. His first work was a comics adaptation of the Victor Hugo novel Bug-Jargal, published in 1989 in collaboration with Sylvain Chomet, whom he had met in Angoulême. He worked at the Walt Disney Animation France studio in Montreuil for two years, and illustrated the comic book Foligatto (1991), which was based on a script by Alexios Tjoyas. Crécy collaborated again with Chomet for the Léon la Came trilogy, which received the Angoulême Prize for Best Album and further established Crécy's reputation for unusual characters and sombre colouring choices. His later works include Monsieur Fruit (1995–96), a humorous black-and-white series; Période Glaciaire (2007), which was commissioned by the Louvre museum; and Salvatore (2011), which was nominated for an Eisner Award. Crécy also worked as a background artist for Chomet's animated film The Old Lady and the Pigeons.

== Awards ==
- 1991: Prize for the Lion, Belgian Center for Comics (for Foligatto)
- 1996: Grand Prix at the festival of Sierre, Switzerland
- 1998: Prize for Best Album, Angoulême International Comics Festival (for the second volume of Léon la Came)
