= Jean Leguay (artist) =

French comics artist

Jean Leguay (French: [ləɡɛ]; born 22 August 1955), better known as Jano ([ʒano]), is a French comics artist.

== Biography ==
Jano studied fine arts in Paris for three years. His first comic was Kebra in 1978, in collaboration with Bertrand Tramber. It was published in French comic magazines B.D., Métal Hurlant, Charlie Mensuel, Rigolo, L'Echo des Savannes and Zoulou. Kebra is a rat-like character, although Jano's protagonists often defy a correct classification as a certain species. Gazoline, a female humanized cheetah, appeared in Kosmik Komiks in 1983. After a trip to Africa in 1984 Jano created Keubla. His style sometimes is compared to Moebius', but more comical and down-to-earth and with definitely more sex scenes.

In addition to his comics Jano illustrated books for children as well as his own travel experiences. In 2003 Anna Azevedo, Renata Baldo, and Eduardo Souza Lima made the documentary film Rio de Jano, showing Jano exploring Rio de Janeiro.

Gazoline et la planète rouge won the Angoulême International Comics Festival Prize for Best Album in 1990.

== Works ==
(This list tries to list the comics with their initial title - the same comics were published by different publishers under different titles several times.)

=== Kebra ===
- Fait comme un rat 1981
- Kebra chope les boules! 1982
- Le zonard des étoiles 1982
- La honte aux trousses 1983
- Kébra Krado Komix 1985
- Les Aventures de Kébra 1997

=== Keubla ===
- Sur La Piste Du Bongo 1986
- Wallaye! 1987

=== Other ===
- Ça Roule 1983
- Carnet D'afrique 1986
- Gazoline et la planète rouge 1989
- Le Pygmée Géant (by Jean-Luc Fromental) 1997
- Kémi - Le Rat De Brousse 1994
- Les Fabuleuses Dérives de Santa Sardinha 1: 1999, 2: 2003
- Bonjour les Indes (with Dodo and Ben Radis) 1991
- Paname 1997
- Rio de Janeiro 2001
