= The Hunting Accident =

2017 graphic novel

- Author: David Carlson, Landis Blair
- Genre: Graphic Novel
- Publisher: First Second Books
- Publication date: September 19, 2017
- ISBN: 978-1-62672-676-5

The Hunting Accident: A True Story of Crime and Poetry is a graphic novel by author David Carlson and illustrator Landis Blair, first published in 2017. It follows the true story of Matt Rizzo in Chicago, and his time in prison with famed murderer Nathan Leopold.

== Plot ==
Charlie Rizzo lives with his father, Matt Rizzo, who has always told Charlie that he was blinded from a young age due to a "hunting accident". Matt is shown to have a particular interest in poetry. One day, after Charlie is involved in the robbery of a house, the police arrive at the home, and begin to ask Matt about his son's involvement in the crime. Matt convinces the police officers to allow him 10 minutes to talk with Charlie.

Matt then proceeds to recount the true cause of his blinding, being an attempted robbery of a liquor store in Gage Park in his youth ending in a shooting. Following his arrest, he was sent to a prison, where he became destitute and depressed. It is then revealed that Matt became cell mates with Nathan Leopold, a famous aristocratic murderer in Chicago. The novel then proceeds to demonstrate how Leopold was able to educate Matt despite his recent blinding through the use of braille, and bring him to a fascination with Dante, which the book depicts as a reflection of the dynamic between the two prisoners.

The novel ends with an adult Charlie Rizzo bringing the story of his father up the steps of a library.

== Themes ==
The novel strongly focuses on the theme of being blinded, and how this influences Matt's perception of the world, accentuated through the dark and cross-hatched art style. The relationships between the characters in the book also resemble those of Virgil and Dante in The Inferno, acting as a metaphorical journey for Matt into the world of Hell, being the prison he is trapped in and the impairment of his vision.

== Background ==
The novel is based on the true story of Charlie Rizzo and his father Matt, a glassmaker based in Chicago. Charlie did not discover the nature of his father's visual impairment as is shown in the novel. Following his father's death, he vowed to have his father's writings published. As this proved difficult, he chose instead to research his father's time in prison and create a story related to this, at which he discovered the connection to Leopold.

== Reception ==
Following its publication in 2017, the novel received positive reviews in publications like Chicago Magazine and New City Lit.
