= Rubén Pellejero =

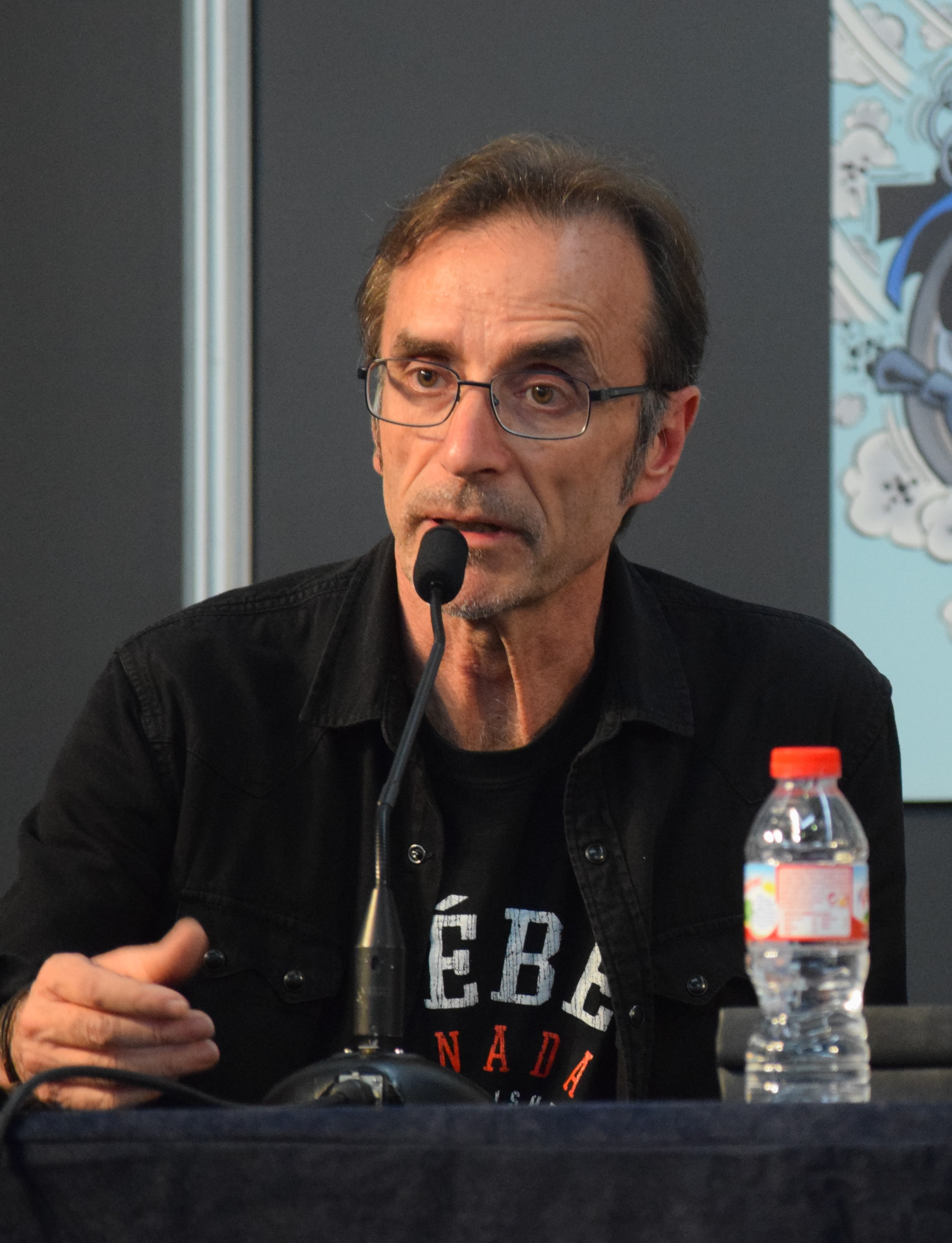
- Born: December 20, 1952 (age 73); Badalona, Catalonia, Spain
- Occupations: Comics artist and illustrator

Rubén Pellejero (born 20 December 1952 in Badalona) is a Spanish comics artist.

== Life and career ==
Pellejero began his artistic career as an illustrstor in the 1970s, but only debuted as a comics author in 1981, when he published at Cimoc magazine the series Historias de una Barcelona. Soon afterwards he began a prolific collaboration with the Argentinian scriptwriter, Jorge Zentner; together they worked in the comics Las memorias de Monsieur Griffaton (Cimoc, 1982), Historias en FM (Cimoc, 1983) and, for Cairo magazine, Dieter Lumpen (1985), protagonist of eight short stories and three larger ones, which were later published in collections by Norma Editorial.

One of his most acclaimed works with Zentner was the 1994 graphic novel El silencio de Malka (The Silence of Malka), which won several awards, including the prize for best foreign comic book published in France at the Angoulême International Comics Festival. In the second half of the 1990s, he undertook new collaborations with Jorge Zentner.

In later years, Pellejero has worked directly for the French market, alongside writer Denis Lapière, publishing two albums: Un poco de humo azul (2000) and El vals del gulag (2004).

Since 2015, Pellejero draws the Corto Maltese albums, written by Juan Diaz Canales, the first artists to work on the title since the death of the creator Hugo Pratt.
