= Jorge Zentner =

Argentine comics writer

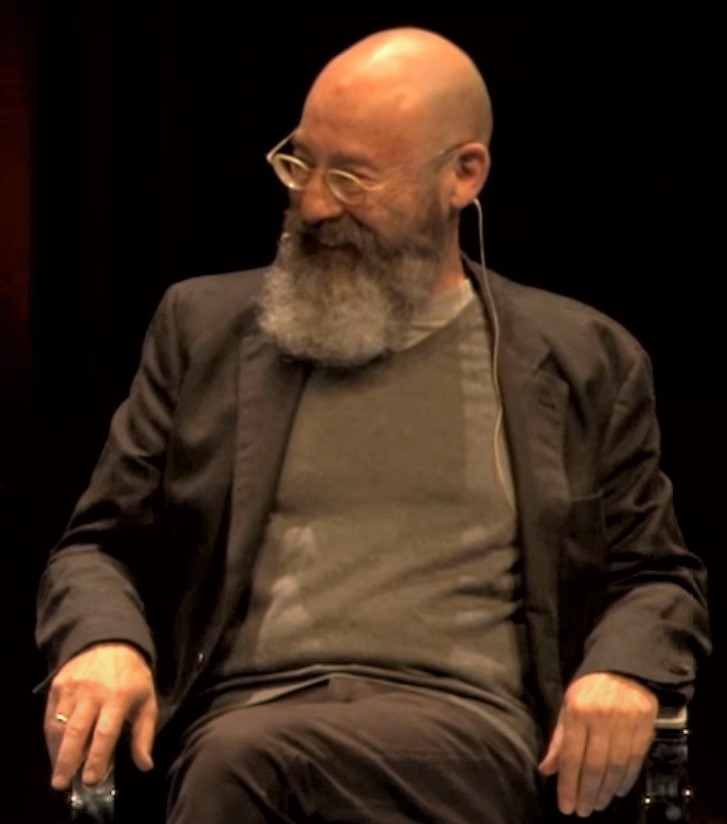
- Jorge Zentner
- Born: 1953 (age 72–73); Basavilbaso, Entre Ríos, Argentina
- Occupation: Comic Writer
- Known for: Creator of Dieter Lumpen

Jorge Zentner (born February 27, 1953) is an Argentine comic writer and the creator of the Dieter Lumpen character.

== Biography ==
Zentner was born at Basavilbaso, Entre Ríos, Argentina, into a Jewish family.

After studying journalism and psychology, he worked as a reporter in Argentina. In 1977 he was forced to flee Argentina, and lived in Israel, Spain and France. He began his career as a comic writer in 1979; in 1981 he started a long collaboration with Spanish artist Rubén Pellejero, with whom he realized most of his work. Comics produced by them include: Le Poignard d'Istambul (1986), Ennemis Communs (1988), Caraïbes (1990) and Le Prix de Charon (1994). Le Silence de Malka (1996) won the Angoulême International Comics Festival in 1997.

In 2000 he published the series Replay, in collaboration with artist David Sala. In 2003, together with Lorenzo Mattotti, he created Le Bruit du Givre.
