= Mezzo (artist) =

French cartoonist (born 1960)

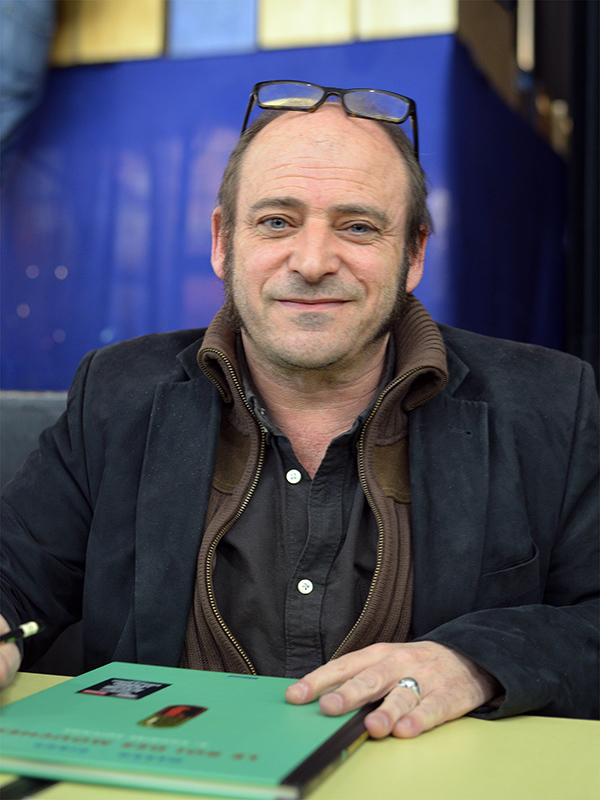
- Mezzo in 2015
- Born: Pascal Mesenburg; 1960 (age 65–66); Drancy, France
- Other name: Mezzo
- Occupations: Artist, writer
- Notable work: King of the Flies; Love in Vain
- Awards: full list

Pascal Mesenburg (born 1960, Drancy, France), pen name Mezzo, is a French cartoonist.

== Biography ==
Mezzo was influenced by 1960s-1970s rock album covers and the American underground scene, including artists like Robert Crumb, Rick Griffin, Robert Williams. These influences provided an "electric" counterpoint to his Franco-Belgian and older American influences.

In 1978, he enrolled at the École nationale supérieure des Beaux-Arts and the École nationale supérieure des arts appliqués et des métiers d'art in Paris but chose to focus on music rather than completing his studies. Concurrently, he published illustrations in various fanzines, graphzines, and Parisian magazines such as Rock en Stock, Best, Zoulou, L'Écho des savanes, Playboy, Métal Aventure. He participated in advertising campaigns for brands such as Pall Mall, Dupuy Saatchi, and Renault.

In 1988, he began collaborating with Michel Pirus, focusing primarily on comics while continuing to work in graphic design and illustration.

His work King of the Flies (Le Roi des mouches), with the first volume published in 2005, received critical acclaim and was translated into Spanish, Dutch, and English. He collaborated with Pirus on the script.

In 2014, he released Love in Vain, which depicts the life of blues musician Robert Johnson, with the script written by Jean-Michel Dupont.

== Bibliography ==
With Michel Pirus, scenarist

- 1991 : Les Désarmés T.1, éd. Zenda ISBN 2-87687-100-9
- 1993 : Les Désarmés T.2, éd. Zenda ISBN 2-8768-7131-9
- 1995 : Deux tueurs, éd. Delcourt ISBN 2-84055-065-2
- 1996 : Un monde étrange (6 short stories published initially by Humanoïdes Associés in collection « Frank Margerin présente »), éd. Delcourt ISBN 2-84055-093-8
- 1997 : Mickey Mickey, éd. Delcourt ISBN 2-84055-151-9
- 2005 : Le Roi des mouches, T.1, Hallorave, éd. Albin Michel - (Official selection of Angoulême International Comics Festival 2006) ISBN 2-226-15531-7
- 2008 : Le Roi des mouches, T.2, L’Origine du monde, éd. Drugstore (Glénat) - (Official selection of Angoulême International Comics Festival 2009) ISBN 978-2-35626-046-8
- 2010 : Les Désarmés (full version reworked and recolored), éd. Drugstore (Glénat) ISBN 978-2-7234-7284-5
- 2013 : Le Roi des mouches T.3, Sourire suivant, éd. Glénat - (Official selection of Angoulême International Comics Festival 2014) ISBN 978-2-7234-7246-3

With Jean-Michel Dupont, scenarist

- 2014 : Love in Vain, Hors collection, éd. Glénat ISBN 978-2-3440-0339-8 — prix des Libraires de Bande Dessinée 2015

== Awards ==
2008 : Prix de la BD du Point, with Michel Pirus, for King of the Flies, vol 2 : The Origin of the World.
