= Lucie Durbiano =

French comic book artist and illustrator

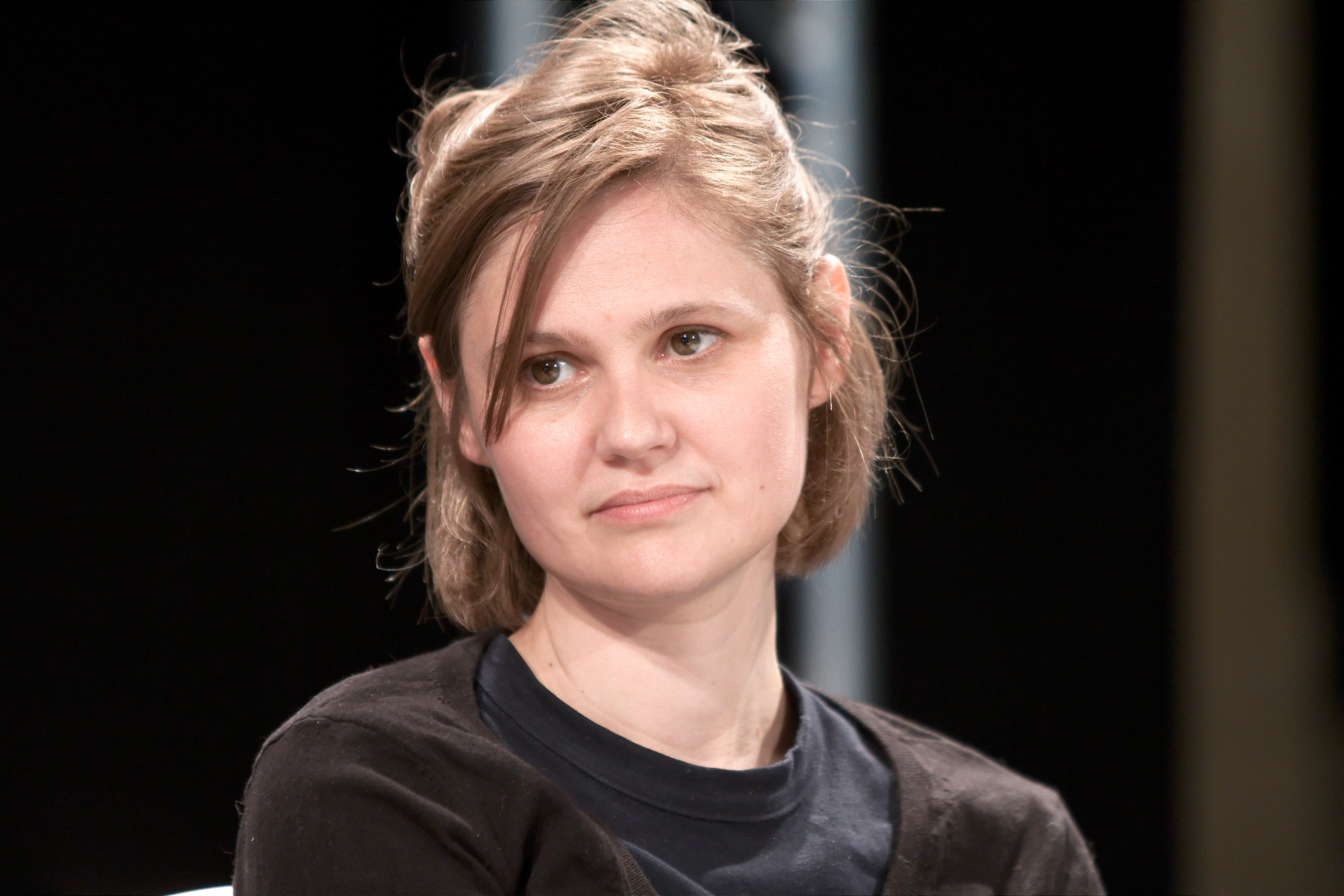
- Born: 12 October 1969 (age 56); Castelsarrasin, France
- Known for: comic book, children's book illustrator

Lucie Durbiano (born 12 October 1969) is a French comic book artist and illustrator.

She was born in Castelsarrasin and grew up in the south of France. She studied art at the Villa Arson in Nice and then at the École supérieure des arts décoratifs de Strasbourg. She began working as an illustrator of children's books in 1999. She has also contributed to magazines such as Pomme d'Api, Toboggan and Astrapi. She began working with comics in 2001, contributing to the Tohu Revue collection. Her strip Les Super Super with Laurence Gillot appears in Astrapi and has been published in book form. Durbiano also provided the drawings for the graphic novel adaptation of Quatre Saison by Malika Ferdjoukh in the magazine Je Bouquine.

== Selected works ==
- 'La Bise du Renne, children's book (1999), text by Laurence Gillot
- Lulu Grenadine, children's book series (2000-2007), text by Laurence Gillot
- Mastic, series
- Laurence, graphic novel (2004). ISBN 2-909590-98-4
- Bizou, graphic novel (2004). ISBN 2-84961-004-6
- Orage et désespoir, graphic novel (2006). ISBN 9-782070-572960
- Le Rouge Vous Va Si Bien, graphic novel (2007). ISBN 9-782070-616541
- Trésor', graphic novel (2009), selection of the Angoulême International Comics Festival. ISBN 9-782070-614769
- Lo, graphic novel (2010), selection of the Angoulême International Comics Festival. ISBN 9-782070-627172
