= The Arrival (graphic novel) =

2006 graphic novel by Shaun Tan

- First edition cover
- Author: Shaun Tan
- Language: English
- Publisher: Hodder Children's Books
- Publication date: 2006
- Publication place: Australia
- Media type: Print (Hardback)
- Pages: 128
- ISBN: 9780340969939
- OCLC: 656667878
- Dewey Decimal: A823.3
- Website: https://www.shauntan.net/arrival-book

The Arrival is a wordless graphic novel written by Shaun Tan and published by Hodder Children's Books in 2006.

The book is a silent comic and contains no dialogue or text throughout the whole book. It spans 128 pages and is organized into six chapters. The work employs panels of varying sizes, including many full-page illustrations. The story focuses on an immigrant's life in an imaginary world, portraying the experience of a father emigrating to a new land. Shaun Tan differentiates The Arrival from children's picture books, citing an emphasis on continuity in texts with multiple frames and panels, and that a graphic novel text like his more closely resembles a film making process. He has additionally described his desire to build a kind of empathy in readers: "In Australia, people don't stop to imagine what it's like for some of these refugees. They just see them as a problem once they're here, without thinking about the bigger picture. I don't expect the book to change anybody's opinion about things, but if it at least makes them pause to think, I'll feel as if I've succeeded in something."

== Plot ==
A man leaves his home to find work and support his family, whose home has apparently become unsafe. In the new land, the man goes through a lengthy administrative process and manages to find a small living space. Although he struggles to understand the different language, navigate the unknown city and to find a secure job, he makes new friends of the locals and learns of the struggles of other refugees that have fled their homes due to slavery and sought asylum from war, sharing his own experiences as well. Eventually, the man’s family joins him in the new land, and they settle into a new, happy life.

Gene Yang has described the novel as conveying messages of solitude, alienation, and hope in a foreign land.

== Style ==
Gene Yang has noted the resemblance between the illustrations and aged photos, and the presence of realistic-looking humans in abstract and bizarre environments that combine futuristic and old-fashioned aesthetics. Tan used real-life models to create a storyboard. He also shot pictures in his garage, using a video camera and empty boxes to create lighting. Shaun Tan has commented on the reason for this process: "I was very dependent on photography for a lot of the drawings, because they're photo-realistic. It's not my favorite style of working, and I didn't feel very confident. The other thing was continuity. When I started, I was drawing everything out of my head by hand, and I was finding that there were accumulating continuity problems—just little things that you notice subconsciously, like the length of a sleeve, how a lapel falls, where the rim of a hat is. The only way to register all of that properly was to photograph a lot of the stuff." Shaun Tan has commented that he was influenced by The Snowman by Raymond Briggs.

== Reception ==
The Arrival won the Best Books for Young Adults, American Library Association, 2008 the *Aurealis Award: Golden Aurealis Short Story Award the Aurealis Award for Best Young Adult Short Story, the Boston Globe-Horn Book Award, Special Citation, the Locus Award for best art book, and the Spectrum Award for Book, Silver Award, and was a finalist for the Hugo Award for Best Related Book, the Chesley Award for Interior Illustration, 2008, the Ditmar Award for Artwork, and the International Horror Guild Award for Illustrated Narrative. The French translation, "Là où Vont Nos Pères", won the Angoulême International Comics Festival Prize for Best Comic Book .

Rovina Cai has credited The Arrival with having made her realize she wanted to be an artist.
