= A Jew in Communist Prague =

Series of graphic novels by Vittorio Giardino

A Jew in Communist Prague is a series of graphic novels created by Vittorio Giardino. They feature the main character Jonas Fink. They were published in the United States by NBM, but in 2018 the NBM editions are out of print (with NBM website no longer having any mention of this graphic novel series). The third volume, Rebellion, won the 1999 Harvey Award for Best American Edition of Foreign Material.

== See also ==
- A Jewish Girl in Shanghai
