= Jean-Pierre Gibrat =

French comic artist and scriptwriter (born 1954)

Jean Pierre Gibrat
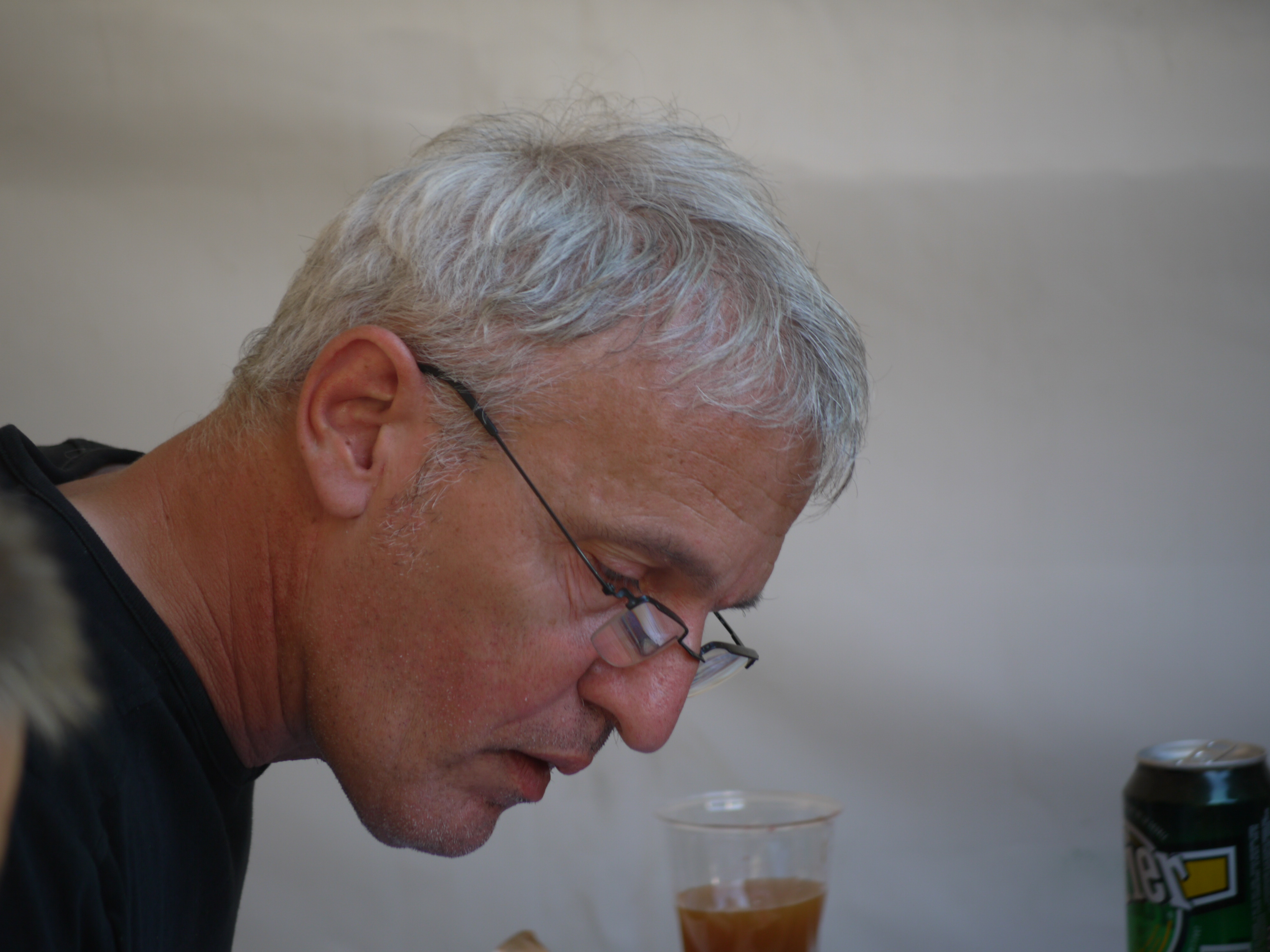
- Jean Pierre Gibrat at 2009 edition of the Comic Strip Festival of Sollies Ville in France.
- Born: Jean Pierre Gibrat; April 14, 1954 (age 72) Paris, France
- Areas: Artist, Writer
- Notable works: Le Sursis; Le Vol du corbeau Mattéo

Jean-Pierre Gibrat (born 14 April 1954) is a French comic artist and scriptwriter. His first complete stories were published in the French magazine Pilote. With Jackie Berroyer, he took on le petit Goudard in 1978, a series which he continued in the same year in Charlie Mensuel, then in Fluide Glacial in 1980. During this time, some of his artwork was also published in the press : L'Événement du jeudi, le Nouvel Obs, Sciences et Avenir and he also produced work for Okapi and Je bouquine. In late 1982, he pencilled La Parisienne in Pilote, again on a script by Berroyer. In 1985, on Saval's texts, Gibrat drew, in Télé Poche, l'Empire sous la mer, an adventure starring the canine character Zaza, created by Dany Saval and Michel Drucker.

In October 1997, the graphic novel Le sursis was released, followed by volume 2 in September 1999, Le vol du Corbeau in 2002 and its second volume in 2005; all of which were published by Dupuis.

== Works ==
- With Jackie Berroyer, Rodolphe, Simonet, and Vulbeau
  - Visions futées, 1980
- With Jackie Berroyer
  - Dossier Goudard, 1978
  - C'est bien du Goudard, 1981
  - La Parisienne, 1983
  - Goudard et la parisienne, 1985
  - Goudard a de la chance, 1987
- With Dany Saval
  - Les Aventures de Zaza, 1985
- Mission en Afrique, 1988
- Mission en Thaïlande, 1991
- Mission au Guatémala, 1994
- Narcisse Mullot, 1994
- Pinocchia, 1995
- Marée basse, 1996
- Le Sursis
  - Volume 1, 1997
  - Volume 2, 1999
- Le Vol du corbeau
  - Volume 1, 2002
  - Volume 2, 2005
- Les Gens Honnêtes
  - Première partie, 2008
  - Deuxième partie, 2010
  - Troisième partie, 2014
  - Quatrième partie, 2016
- Mattéo
  - Première époque (1914-1915), 2008
  - Deuxième époque (1917-1918), 2010
  - Troisième époque (août 1936), 2013
  - Quatrième époque (août-septembre 1936), 2017
  - Cinquième époque (septembre 1936-janvier 1939), 2019
  - Sixième époque (2 septembre 1939-3 juin 1940), 2022
- Jeanne et Cécile, 2011
- L'hiver en été, 2019
