= Harvey Award for Best International Book =

American award for translated comic books

Best International Book
- Country: United States
- Formerly called: Best European Book
- First award: 2018

The Harvey Award for Best International Book, established in 2018 as part of the Harvey Awards, is an annual American award for comic books written outside of the United States. Prior to 2020, the award was known as the Harvey Award for Best European Book. Per the Harvey Awards website, the Best International Book Award honors the "Best international material translated in to English."

== Recipients ==
Best International Book winners and finalists
Year	Title	Author	Translator	Publisher	Ref.
2018 (Note: As Best European Book)	California Dreamin': Cass Elliot Before the Mamas & the Papas	Pénélope Bagieu		First Second	
2018	Audubon: On the Wings of the World	Fabien Grolleau and Jerémie Royer		Nobrow	
2018	Flight of the Raven	Jean-Pierre Gibrat		IDW	
2018	The Ghost of Gaudi	El Torres and Jesús Alonso Iglesias		Magnetic Press	
2018	The Ladies in Waiting	Santiago García and Javier Olivares		Fantagraphics	
2019 (Note: As Best European Book)	Waves	Ingrid Chabbert and Carole Maurel		Archaia	
2019	Corto Maltese	Hugo Pratt		IDW Publishing	
2019	O Josephine	Jason		Fantagraphics	
2019	Radiant	Tony Valente		VIZ Media	
2019	Red Ultramarine	Manuele Fior	Jamie Richards	Fantagraphics	
2020	Grass	Keum Suk Gendry-Kim	Janet Hong	Drawn & Quarterly	
2020	The House	Paco Roca		Fantagraphics	
2020	Portrait of a Drunk	Olivier Schrauwen, Florent Ruppert, and Jérôme		Fantagraphics	
2020	Stay	Lewis Trondheim and Hubert Chevillard		Magnetic Press	
2020	Year of the Rabbit	Tian Veasna		Drawn & Quarterly	
2021	Moms	Yeong-shin Ma	Janet Hong	Drawn & Quarterly	
2021	The City of Belgium	Brecht Evens		Drawn & Quarterly	
2021	Factory Summers	Guy Delisle	Helge Dascher and Rob Aspinall	Drawn & Quarterly	
2021	Paul At Home	Michel Rabagliati	Helge Dascher and Rob Aspinall	Drawn & Quarterly	
2021	The Winter of the Cartoonist	Paco Roca	Andrea Rosenberg	Fantagraphics	
2022	Sweet Paprika	Mirka Andolfo		Image Comics	
2022	Ballad for Sophie	Filipe Melo and Juan Cavia	Gabriela Soares	Top Shelf Productions	
2022	Castaways	Pablo Monforte and Laura Perez	Silvia Perea Labayen	Dark Horse Comics	
2022	This is How I Disappear	Mirion Malle	Aleshia Jensen and Bronwyn Haslam	Drawn & Quarterly	
2022	The Waiting	Keum Suk Gendry-Kim	Janet Hong	Drawn & Quarterly	
2022	Yellow Cab	Benoît Cohen and Christophe Chabouté		IDW Publishing	
2023	Blacksad: They All Fall Down Part 1	Juan Díaz Canales and Juanjo Guarnido	Diana Schutz and Brandon Kander	Dark Horse Books	
2023	Alice on the Run: One Child's Journey Through the Rwandan Civil War	Gaspard Talmasse	Nanette McGuinness	Life Drawn	
2023	Always Never	Jordi Lafebre and Clemence Sapin		Dark Horse Books	
2023	Ashes	Álvaro Ortiz	Eva Ibarzabal	Top Shelf Productions	
2023	The Extraordinary Part: Book One: Orsay's Hands	Florent Ruppert and Jérôme Mulot	M. B. Valente	Fantagraphics	
2023	Tiki: A Very Ruff Year	David Azencot, Fred Leclerc, and Lucie Firou	Nanette McGuinness	Life Drawn	
2024	Blacksad Vol. 7	Juan Díaz Canales and Juanjo Guarnido	Diana Schutz and Brandon Kander	Europe Comics	
2024	The Great Beyond	Murawiec	Aleshia Jensen	Drawn & Quarterly	
2024	Shubeik Lubeik	Deena Mohamed		Pantheon	
2024	A Boy Named Rose	Gaëlle Geniller	Fabrice Sapolsky	Fairsquare Graphics	
2024	Transitions: A Mother's Journey	Élodie Durand	Evan McGorray	Top Shelf Productions	
2024	Layers	Pénélope Bagieu	Montana Kane	First Second	
2024	Inside the Mind of Sherlock Holmes	Cyril Lieron and Benoit Dahan		Titan	
2025	Blacksad: They All Fall Down Part 2	Juan Díaz Canales and Juanjo Guarnido	Diana Schutz and Brandon Kander	Dark Horse Books	
2025	Mothballs	Sole Otero	Andrea Rosenberg	Fantagraphics	
2025	Muybridge	Guy Delisle	Helge Dascher and Rob Aspinall	Drawn & Quarterly	
2025	Sunday	Olivier Schrauwen		Fantagraphics	
2025	The Road: A Graphic Novel Adaptation	Manu Larcenet, from the novel by Cormac McCarthy		Abrams	
2026	Nocturnos	Laura Perez	Andrea Rosenberg	Fantagraphics	
2026	Animan	Anouk Ricard	Montana Kane	Drawn & Quarterly	
2026	Buff Soul	Moa Romanova	Melissa Bowers	Fantagraphics	
2026	Mary Pain	Lola Lorente	Andrea Rosenberg	Drawn & Quarterly	
2026	Tiodora's Letters: An Enslaved Woman's Fight for Family and Freedom	Marcelo D'Salete	Andrea Rosenberg	Fantagraphics	
2026	Witchcraft	Sole Otero	Andrea Rosenberg	Fantagraphics	
