= Transitions: A Mother's Journey =

2021 graphic novel by Élodie Durand

Transitions: A Mother's Journey (French: Transitions: Journal d'Anne Marbot, [an maʁbo]) is a 2021 graphic novel by Élodie Durand, published by Delcourt/Mirages. It was translated into English by Evan McGorray and published in that language in 2023 by Top Shelf.

== Background ==
Durand based the story on a woman she got to know; she spent three years talking to the woman. Duran used names she said were not people's real names, and she stated that the narrative is "between fiction and reality."

The translator of the English version is non-binary and transgender.

== Content ==
The story set in France, is about a woman named Anne Marbot and her son, Alex, who had been assigned female at birth and originally named Lucie. Anne is a biologist who works in a university, and the story mainly is set from her viewpoint. The woman's 19-year old child comes out as a trans man. In the opening of the book, she attends a therapy session. Anne has trouble accepting her son's gender and identity.

The book includes a letter written by the person who Alex is based on. The letters are from the son's point of view.

== Reception ==
Terry Hong of Booklist gave the book a starred review.

Taneer Oksman of National Public Radio described it as a "welcome addition" in its field.

Martha Cornog of Library Journal gave the book a starred review, and described it as "An excellent graphic novel and resource".

The book was nominated for the 2024 Harvey Award for Best International Book.
