= KFCC =

KFCC may refer to:

- KFCC-LP, a low-power radio station (97.9 FM) licensed to serve Mission, Texas, United States
- Korea Foundation
