= The Naked Tree (graphic novel) =

2019 graphic novel by Keum Suk Gendry-Kim

The Naked Tree (Korean: 나목, Namok) is a 2019 Korean-language graphic novel by Keum Suk Gendry-Kim. Janet Hong translated the book into English, and this version was published in 2023 by Drawn and Quarterly.

It is a graphic novel version of a work of the same name by Park Wan-Suh. It focuses on Park Su-geun and Lee Kyeonga. Gendry-Kim chose to make changes to the narrative instead of simply adapting the work. Originally Gendry-Kim wanted to adhere to the original novel.

Publishers Weekly gave the book a starred review, and stated that it is "masterful and devastating". Graziano Krätli, in World Literature Today, wrote that the work handles its themes through a "more subdued and meditative" approach in relation to Gendry-Kim's other works.

Terry Hong of Booklist gave a starred review and wrote that the work is "immersive, potent, enduring".

Charles La Shure of Seoul National University wrote in Koreana that the comic is "beautiful window on" the novel.

== See also ==
Other graphic novels by Gendry-Kim:

- Dog Days
- Grass
- The Waiting
