= Hangul alphabetical order =

Letter order of the Korean alphabet

The Korean alphabet, known as Hangul internationally, Hangeul in South Korea, and Choson'gŭl in North Korea, has had multiple different alphabetical orders throughout its history and even currently.

== Current orders ==
=== North Korean ===
North Korea uses the following orders:

Initial consonants: ㄱ ㄴ ㄷ ㄹ ㅁ ㅂ ㅅ ㅈ ㅊ ㅋ ㅌ ㅍ ㅎ ㄲ ㄸ ㅃ ㅆ ㅉ ㅇ (Note: The initial ㅇ is introduced in North Korea's official Compendium of Korean Language Norms after ㅅ. Some non–North Korean scholarly sources also use that ordering. This ordering places ㅇ at the end because, when it is an initial, it does not produce its own sound. In 1999, North Korea submitted a proposal to Unicode and ISO (eventually rejected) that places ㅇ at the end of the order for initial consonants.)
Vowels: ㅏ ㅑ ㅓ ㅕ ㅗ ㅛ ㅜ ㅠ ㅡ ㅣ ㅐ ㅒ ㅔ ㅖ ㅚ ㅟ ㅢ ㅘ ㅝ ㅙ ㅞ
Final consonants: ∅ ㄱ ㄳ ㄴ ㄵ ㄶ ㄷ ㄹ ㄺ ㄻ ㄼ ㄽ ㄾ ㄿ ㅀ ㅁ ㅂ ㅄ ㅅ ㅇ ㅈ ㅊ ㅋ ㅌ ㅍ ㅎ ㄲ ㅆ

Modifications and combinations of initial consonants and vowels are placed at the end of the order. Final consonants follow the same order as initial, but combinations of consonants are inserted into that order and are sorted by the second consonant. For consonants, South Korean linguist Ho-min Sohn describes North Korea's ordering as phonologically motivated but less intuitive to Korean speakers, as most perceive a relationship between especially double consonants and their single variants. He also argues it is more difficult to remember. For vowels, Sohn argued the ordering was especially unintuitive, as added letters are given sort priority over base letters.

The 11,172 characters in the Hangul Syllables block in Unicode follow the South Korean order (see below). North Korea later submitted a proposal to rearrange the characters to follow its own order, but it was rejected.

=== South Korean ===
South Korea uses the following orders:

Initial consonants: ㄱ ㄲ ㄴ ㄷ ㄸ ㄹ ㅁ ㅂ ㅃ ㅅ ㅆ ㅇ ㅈ ㅉ ㅊ ㅋ ㅌ ㅍ ㅎ
Vowels: ㅏ ㅐ ㅑ ㅒ ㅓ ㅔ ㅕ ㅖ ㅗ ㅘ ㅙ ㅚ ㅛ ㅜ ㅝ ㅞ ㅟ ㅠ ㅡ ㅢ ㅣ
Final consonants: ∅ ㄱ ㄲ ㄳ ㄴ ㄵ ㄶ ㄷ ㄹ ㄺ ㄻ ㄼ ㄽ ㄾ ㄿ ㅀ ㅁ ㅂ ㅄ ㅅ ㅆ ㅇ ㅈ ㅊ ㅋ ㅌ ㅍ ㅎ

Modifications and combinations of letters are placed just after the primary or initial parent letter. Such modifications and combinations are then sorted according to the previously established orders. E.g. ㄱ is followed by ㄲ and ㅘ by ㅙ.

The South Korean orders are based on those of the Hunmong chahoe, but with ㅈ and ㅊ placed earlier in the sequence. Hong Yun-pyo claims this is because their sound values had shifted over time to values no longer representable by fanqie.

==== KS X 1026-1 ====
The South Korean national standard KS X 1026-1, enacted in 2007, includes sort orders that account for the various Hangul Unicode code points, including obsolete letters.

Initial consonants

Letter	Unicode
ᄀ	U+1100
ᄁ	U+1101
ᅚ	U+115A
ᄂ	U+1102
ᄓ	U+1113
ᄔ	U+1114
ᄕ	U+1115
ᄖ	U+1116
ᅛ	U+115B
ᅜ	U+115C
ᅝ	U+115D
ᄃ	U+1103
ᄗ	U+1117
ᄄ	U+1104
ᅞ	U+115E
ꥠ	U+A960
ꥡ	U+A961
ꥢ	U+A962
ꥣ	U+A963
ᄅ	U+1105
ꥤ	U+A964
ꥥ	U+A965
ᄘ	U+1118
ꥦ	U+A966
ꥧ	U+A967
ᄙ	U+1119
ꥨ	U+A968
ꥩ	U+A969
ꥪ	U+A96A
ꥫ	U+A96B
ꥬ	U+A96C
ꥭ	U+A96D
ꥮ	U+A96E
ᄚ	U+111A
ᄛ	U+111B
ᄆ	U+1106
ꥯ	U+A96F
ꥰ	U+A970
ᄜ	U+111C
ꥱ	U+A971
ᄝ	U+111D
ᄇ	U+1107
ᄞ	U+111E
ᄟ	U+111F
ᄠ	U+1120
ᄈ	U+1108
ᄡ	U+1121
ᄢ	U+1122
ᄣ	U+1123
ᄤ	U+1124
ᄥ	U+1125
ᄦ	U+1126
ꥲ	U+A972
ᄧ	U+1127
ᄨ	U+1128
ꥳ	U+A973
ᄩ	U+1129
ᄪ	U+112A
ꥴ	U+A974
ᄫ	U+112B
ᄬ	U+112C
ᄉ	U+1109
ᄭ	U+112D
ᄮ	U+112E
ᄯ	U+112F
ᄰ	U+1130
ᄱ	U+1131
ᄲ	U+1132
ᄳ	U+1133
ᄊ	U+110A
ꥵ	U+A975
ᄴ	U+1134
ᄵ	U+1135
ᄶ	U+1136
ᄷ	U+1137
ᄸ	U+1138
ᄹ	U+1139
ᄺ	U+113A
ᄻ	U+113B
ᄼ	U+113C
ᄽ	U+113D
ᄾ	U+113E
ᄿ	U+113F
ᅀ	U+1140
ᄋ	U+110B
ᅁ	U+1141
ᅂ	U+1142
ꥶ	U+A976
ᅃ	U+1143
ᅄ	U+1144
ᅅ	U+1145
ᅆ	U+1146
ᅇ	U+1147
ᅈ	U+1148
ᅉ	U+1149
ᅊ	U+114A
ᅋ	U+114B
ꥷ	U+A977
ᅌ	U+114C
ᄌ	U+110C
ᅍ	U+114D
ᄍ	U+110D
ꥸ	U+A978
ᅎ	U+114E
ᅏ	U+114F
ᅐ	U+1150
ᅑ	U+1151
ᄎ	U+110E
ᅒ	U+1152
ᅓ	U+1153
ᅔ	U+1154
ᅕ	U+1155
ᄏ	U+110F
ᄐ	U+1110
ꥹ	U+A979
ᄑ	U+1111
ᅖ	U+1156
ꥺ	U+A97A
ᅗ	U+1157
ᄒ	U+1112
ꥻ	U+A97B
ᅘ	U+1158
ᅙ	U+1159
ꥼ	U+A97C
ᅟ	U+115F

Vowels

Letter	Unicode
ᅠ	U+1160
ᅡ	U+1161
ᅶ	U+1176
ᅷ	U+1177
ᆣ	U+11A3
ᅢ	U+1162
ᅣ	U+1163
ᅸ	U+1178
ᅹ	U+1179
ᆤ	U+11A4
ᅤ	U+1164
ᅥ	U+1165
ᅺ	U+117A
ᅻ	U+117B
ᅼ	U+117C
ᅦ	U+1166
ᅧ	U+1167
ᆥ	U+11A5
ᅽ	U+117D
ᅾ	U+117E
ᅨ	U+1168
ᅩ	U+1169
ᅪ	U+116A
ᅫ	U+116B
ᆦ	U+11A6
ᆧ	U+11A7
ᅿ	U+117F
ᆀ	U+1180
ힰ	U+D7B0
ᆁ	U+1181
ᆂ	U+1182
ힱ	U+D7B1
ᆃ	U+1183
ᅬ	U+116C
ᅭ	U+116D
ힲ	U+D7B2
ힳ	U+D7B3
ᆄ	U+1184
ᆅ	U+1185
ힴ	U+D7B4
ᆆ	U+1186
ᆇ	U+1187
ᆈ	U+1188
ᅮ	U+116E
ᆉ	U+1189
ᆊ	U+118A
ᅯ	U+116F
ᆋ	U+118B
ᅰ	U+1170
ힵ	U+D7B5
ᆌ	U+118C
ᆍ	U+118D
ᅱ	U+1171
ힶ	U+D7B6
ᅲ	U+1172
ᆎ	U+118E
ힷ	U+D7B7
ᆏ	U+118F
ᆐ	U+1190
ᆑ	U+1191
ᆒ	U+1192
ힸ	U+D7B8
ᆓ	U+1193
ᆔ	U+1194
ᅳ	U+1173
ힹ	U+D7B9
ힺ	U+D7BA
ힻ	U+D7BB
ힼ	U+D7BC
ᆕ	U+1195
ᆖ	U+1196
ᅴ	U+1174
ᆗ	U+1197
ᅵ	U+1175
ᆘ	U+1198
ᆙ	U+1199
ힽ	U+D7BD
ힾ	U+D7BE
ힿ	U+D7BF
ퟀ	U+D7C0
ᆚ	U+119A
ퟁ	U+D7C1
ퟂ	U+D7C2
ᆛ	U+119B
ퟃ	U+D7C3
ᆜ	U+119C
ퟄ	U+D7C4
ᆝ	U+119D
ᆞ	U+119E
ퟅ	U+D7C5
ᆟ	U+119F
ퟆ	U+D7C6
ᆠ	U+11A0
ᆡ	U+11A1
ᆢ	U+11A2

Final consonants

Letter	Unicode
(none)	—
ᆨ	U+11A8
ᆩ	U+11A9
ᇺ	U+11FA
ᇃ	U+11C3
ᇻ	U+11FB
ᆪ	U+11AA
ᇄ	U+11C4
ᇼ	U+11FC
ᇽ	U+11FD
ᇾ	U+11FE
ᆫ	U+11AB
ᇅ	U+11C5
ᇿ	U+11FF
ᇆ	U+11C6
ퟋ	U+D7CB
ᇇ	U+11C7
ᇈ	U+11C8
ᆬ	U+11AC
ퟌ	U+D7CC
ᇉ	U+11C9
ᆭ	U+11AD
ᆮ	U+11AE
ᇊ	U+11CA
ퟍ	U+D7CD
ퟎ	U+D7CE
ᇋ	U+11CB
ퟏ	U+D7CF
ퟐ	U+D7D0
ퟑ	U+D7D1
ퟒ	U+D7D2
ퟓ	U+D7D3
ퟔ	U+D7D4
ᆯ	U+11AF
ᆰ	U+11B0
ퟕ	U+D7D5
ᇌ	U+11CC
ퟖ	U+D7D6
ᇍ	U+11CD
ᇎ	U+11CE
ᇏ	U+11CF
ᇐ	U+11D0
ퟗ	U+D7D7
ᆱ	U+11B1
ᇑ	U+11D1
ᇒ	U+11D2
ퟘ	U+D7D8
ᆲ	U+11B2
ퟙ	U+D7D9
ᇓ	U+11D3
ퟚ	U+D7DA
ᇔ	U+11D4
ᇕ	U+11D5
ᆳ	U+11B3
ᇖ	U+11D6
ᇗ	U+11D7
ퟛ	U+D7DB
ᇘ	U+11D8
ᆴ	U+11B4
ᆵ	U+11B5
ᆶ	U+11B6
ᇙ	U+11D9
ퟜ	U+D7DC
ퟝ	U+D7DD
ᆷ	U+11B7
ᇚ	U+11DA
ퟞ	U+D7DE
ퟟ	U+D7DF
ᇛ	U+11DB
ퟠ	U+D7E0
ᇜ	U+11DC
ퟡ	U+D7E1
ᇝ	U+11DD
ᇞ	U+11DE
ᇟ	U+11DF
ퟢ	U+D7E2
ᇠ	U+11E0
ᇡ	U+11E1
ᇢ	U+11E2
ᆸ	U+11B8
ퟣ	U+D7E3
ᇣ	U+11E3
ퟤ	U+D7E4
ퟥ	U+D7E5
ퟦ	U+D7E6
ᆹ	U+11B9
ퟧ	U+D7E7
ퟨ	U+D7E8
ퟩ	U+D7E9
ᇤ	U+11E4
ᇥ	U+11E5
ᇦ	U+11E6
ᆺ	U+11BA
ᇧ	U+11E7
ᇨ	U+11E8
ᇩ	U+11E9
ퟪ	U+D7EA
ᇪ	U+11EA
ퟫ	U+D7EB
ᆻ	U+11BB
ퟬ	U+D7EC
ퟭ	U+D7ED
ퟮ	U+D7EE
ퟯ	U+D7EF
ퟰ	U+D7F0
ퟱ	U+D7F1
ퟲ	U+D7F2
ᇫ	U+11EB
ퟳ	U+D7F3
ퟴ	U+D7F4
ᆼ	U+11BC
ᇰ	U+11F0
ᇬ	U+11EC
ᇭ	U+11ED
ퟵ	U+D7F5
ᇱ	U+11F1
ᇲ	U+11F2
ᇮ	U+11EE
ᇯ	U+11EF
ퟶ	U+D7F6
ᆽ	U+11BD
ퟷ	U+D7F7
ퟸ	U+D7F8
ퟹ	U+D7F9
ᆾ	U+11BE
ᆿ	U+11BF
ᇀ	U+11C0
ᇁ	U+11C1
ᇳ	U+11F3
ퟺ	U+D7FA
ퟻ	U+D7FB
ᇴ	U+11F4
ᇂ	U+11C2
ᇵ	U+11F5
ᇶ	U+11F6
ᇷ	U+11F7
ᇸ	U+11F8
ᇹ	U+11F9

== Historical orders ==
=== Hunminjeongeum orders ===
==== Yeui orders ====
The Yeui portion of the Hunminjeongeum (the part written by Sejong the Great) does not explicitly give letter orders. However, it does introduce the letters in these orders:

Initial consonants: ㄱ ㅋ ㆁ ㄷ ㅌ ㄴ ㅂ ㅍ ㅁ ㅈ ㅊ ㅅ ㆆ ㅎ ㅇ ㄹ ㅿ
Vowels: ㆍ ㅡ ㅣ ㅗ ㅏ ㅜ ㅓ ㅛ ㅑ ㅠ ㅕ

The order of the consonants is based on the conventional orders of the classes and articulations of the Chinese linguistic system fanqie. First, the letters are introduced by class, then by articulations within each class.

The three basic vowels are first introduced, then the four one-dot modifications, then the four two-dot modifications.

==== Haerye orders ====
The Haerye portion of the Hunminjeongeum also does not give explicit orders. It discusses aspects of the characters in a number of different orders, with some sections explaining different sets of characters in differing orders.

=== Hunmong chahoe orders ===
The 1527 text Hunmong chahoe gives the following orders:

Consonants: ㄱ ㄴ ㄷ ㄹ ㅁ ㅂ ㅅ ㆁ ㅋ ㅌ ㅍ ㅈ ㅊ ㅿ ㅇ ㅎ
Vowels: ㅏ ㅑ ㅓ ㅕ ㅗ ㅛ ㅜ ㅠ ㅡ ㅣ ㆍ

The first eight consonants are those that were then used as both initial and final consonants. The ones only used as initials and not finals are placed last. Within each grouping of eight, the orders of the fanqie classes are applied. Within each class, instead of sorting by fanqie articulations, the characters are then sorted by number of strokes to draw each character, in increasing order.

For the vowels, Hong argues that their order is likely not original to this text, and instead derived from older texts like the 1455 text Hongmu chŏngun yŏkhun. They sort the vowels from those where the mouth is most open to the most closed during their vocalization.

These orders heavily influenced later orders, including the orders now used in North and South Korea.

=== Chinŏnjip orders ===
The 1569 Buddhist text Chinŏnjip (진언집; 眞言集), which is considered of interest to linguists for its instructional materials on Hangul, gives the following orders:

Consonants: ㄱ ㄴ ㄷ ㄹ ㅁ ㅂ ㅅ ㆁ ㅋ ㅌ ㅍ ㅈ ㅊ ㅿ ㅇ ㅎ
Vowels: ㅏ ㅑ ㅓ ㅕ ㅗ ㅛ ㅜ ㅠ ㅡ ㅣ ㆍ

These orders are the same as those in the Hunmong chahoe, which indicates the influence of that text on this.

=== Samunsŏnghwi orders ===
The 1751 text Samunsŏnghwi (삼운성휘; 三韻聲彙) gives the following orders:

Initial consonants: ㄱ ㄴ ㄷ ㄹ ㅁ ㅂ ㅅ ㅇ ㅈ ㅊ ㅌ ㅋ ㅍ ㅎ
Vowels: ㅏ ㅑ ㅓ ㅕ ㅗ ㅛ ㅜ ㅠ ㅡ ㅣ ㆍ

=== Ŏnmunji orders ===
The 1824 text Ŏnmunji by Yu Hŭi gives the following orders:

Initial consonants: ㄱ ㄴ ㄷ ㄹ ㅁ ㅂ ㅅ ㆁ ㅋ ㅌ ㅍ ㅈ ㅊ ㅎ ㅸ
Vowels: ㅏ ㅑ ㅓ ㅕ ㅗ ㅛ ㅜ ㅠ ㅡ ㅣ ㆍ
Sample of the final consonants: ㄱ ㄴ ㄷ ㄹ ㅁ ㅂ ㅅ ㅇ

Yu does not provide a full list of the final consonants, and only provides the examples above.

=== Unified Hangul Orthography orders ===
The 1933 Unified Hangul Orthography gives the following orders:

Consonants: ㄱ ㄴ ㄷ ㄹ ㅁ ㅂ ㅅ ㅇ ㅈ ㅊ ㅋ ㅌ ㅍ ㅎ
Vowels: ㅏ ㅑ ㅓ ㅕ ㅗ ㅛ ㅜ ㅠ ㅡ ㅣ

It also separately gives orders for the following combined letters, without specifying how these are ordered relative to the above consonants and vowels:

Consonants: ㄲ ㄸ ㅃ ㅆ ㅉ
Vowels: ㅐ ㅒ ㅔ ㅖ ㅘ ㅙ ㅚ ㅝ ㅞ ㅟ ㅢ

=== Gyeoremal-keunsajeon orders ===
The Gyeoremal-keunsajeon is a joint North–South Korea dictionary project compiled by a joint commission from both sides. Its compilation began in 2004. The orders selected for this dictionary have only been applied here; South Korean linguist Hong Yun-pyo argued it is unlikely it will be used elsewhere. The commission agreed on the following orders:

Initial consonants: ㄱ ㄴ ㄷ ㄹ ㅁ ㅂ ㅅ ㅇ ㅈ ㅊ ㅋ ㅌ ㅍ ㅎ ㄲ ㄸ ㅃ ㅆ ㅉ
Vowels: ㅏ ㅑ ㅓ ㅕ ㅗ ㅛ ㅜ ㅠ ㅡ ㅣ ㅐ ㅒ ㅔ ㅖ ㅘ ㅚ ㅙ ㅝ ㅟ ㅞ ㅢ
Final consonants: ㄱ ㄴ ㄷ ㄹ ㅁ ㅂ ㅅ ㅇ ㅈ ㅊ ㅋ ㅌ ㅍ ㅎ ㄲ ㄳ ㄵ ㄶ ㄺ ㄻ ㄼ ㄽ ㄾ ㄿ ㅀ ㅄ ㅆ
