= The Road: A Graphic Novel Adaptation =

2024 comic book by Manu Larcenet

The Road (La Route)
- Page count: 176 pages
- Publisher: Dargaud

Creative team
- Writer: Manu Larcenet, after Cormac McCarthy
- Artist: Manu Larcenet

Original publication
- Date of publication: 29 March 2024
- Language: French
- ISBN: 9782205208153

Translation
- Publisher: Abrams ComicArts
- Date: 17 September 2024
- ISBN: 9781419776779

The Road: A Graphic Novel Adaptation (French: La Route) is a French comic book by Manu Larcenet, published by Dargaud on 29 March 2024. It is based on the novel The Road by Cormac McCarthy and follows a father and his son who try to survive in a post-apocalyptic wasteland.

François Rissel of ActuaBD wrote that it "faithfully transposes the violence and horror" of McCarthy's novel and "carries a brutal, almost nihilistic vision".

The book was nominated for the 2025 Harvey Award for Best International Book
