= Keum Suk Gendry-Kim =

South Korean comic artist (born 1971)

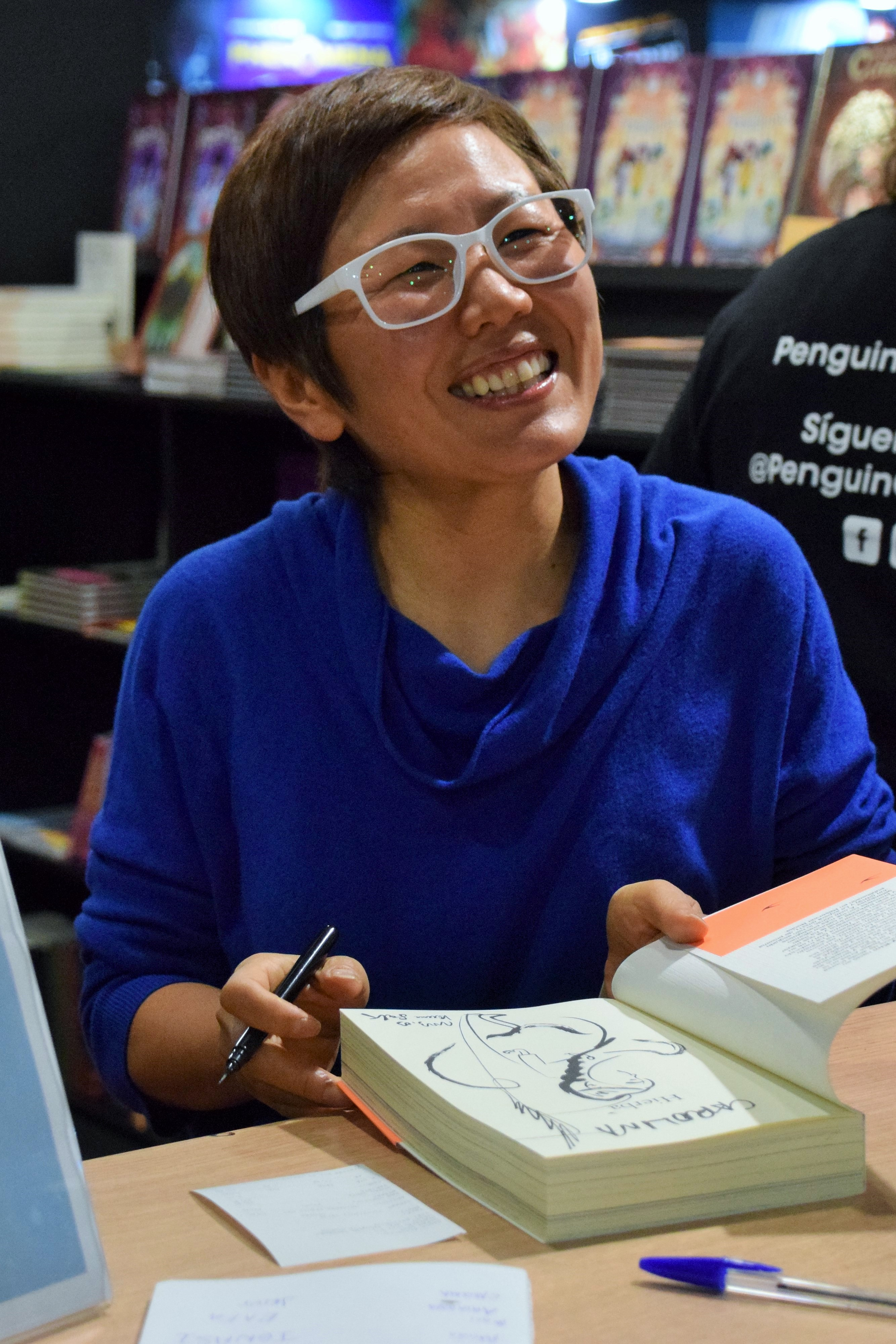
- Born: 1971 (age 54–55); Goheung, South Jeolla Province, South Korea
- Education: Sejong University; Strasbourg School of Decorative Arts
- Occupations: Illustrator, penciller
- Spouse: Loïc Gendry
- Awards: Harvey Awards (2020)

Keum Suk Gendry-Kim (Korean: 김 금숙; born 1971) is a South Korean comic book artist and translator. She won the Harvey Award and the Ordre des Arts et des Lettres. She currently lives on Ganghwa Island.

== Life ==
Gendry-Kim was born in Goheung, South Jeolla Province. For economic reasons, her family moved from rural Korea to the capital Seoul during her childhood, a story portrayed in her work "Le chant de mon père". She left the country in 1994, moving to Paris.

She studied Western painting at Sejong University and in 1998 graduated in arts, specializing in sculpture and installation at the Strasbourg School of Decorative Arts. After graduating in 1998, she stayed on for another year to continue her studies. During this year she worked as a teaching assistant and assisted Korean exchange students, and completed her post-diplôme in the Reliure section (bookbinding).

In 1997, when Gendry-Kim's mother went to spend some time in Paris, she learned of the story of her mother, who was separated from her sister during the Korean War, a drama later recounted in her work of fiction "The Waiting".

After his time at the Strasbourg School of Decorative Arts, she did some exhibitions and residencies abroad, but had financial difficulties. So she started a part-time job translating Korean comics into French, where she developed her interest in the genre. Keum Suk Gendry-Kim has translated about a hundred graphic novels.

After living years in France, Keum Suk Gendry-Kim and her husband Loïc Gendry moved to South Korea in 2011.

She had already published some smaller works in 2010 before making her comic book debut in 2012 with the autobiographical comic book Le chant de mon père, published by Éditions Sarbacane.

It was in 2013, when she worked on a short comic book called "Secret" (비밀) to an exhibition on Japanese military sexual slavery at the Angoulême International Comics Festival, that she decided to write a comic book about the plight of sex slaves during the war, called 'comfort women', which resulted in her award-winning work Grass.

On 28 May 2026, Gendry-Kim was appointed a Chevalier of France's Ordre des Arts et des Lettres at a ceremony at the French Embassy in Seoul. She was the first South Korean comics artist to receive the honour.

== Works ==
- My Friend Kim Jong-Un (내 친구 김정은 nae chingu gimjeongeun, 2024)
- Tomorrow Will Be a New Day (내일은 또 다른 날 naeireun tto dareun nal, 2023)
- Dog Days (2021)
- The Waiting (2020)
- The Naked Tree (2019)
- Alexandra Kim, Daughter of Siberia (시베리아의 딸, 김알렉산드라 siberiaui ttal, gimalleksandeura, 2020)
- Jun (준이 오빠 Juni Oppa, 2018).
- Grass (2017)
- Jiseul (2015).
- De case en case: portraits de 15 bédéistes sud-coréens (2015).
- Le chant de mon père (2012).

== Awards ==
Awards
Work	Category	Award	Year	Status
Grass	Non-fiction	Believer Book Award	2020	Nominated
Grass	Best Print Comic of the Year	The Cartoonist Studio Prize	2020	Winner
Grass	Best Graphic Novel	Big Other Book Award	2020	Winner
Grass	Best Graphic Novel	LA Times Book Prize	2020	Nominated
Grass	Best Reality-Based Work	Eisner Award	2020	Nominated
Grass	Best Writer/Artist	Eisner Award	2020	Nominated
Grass	Best U.S. Edition of International Material	Eisner Award	2020	Nominated
Grass	Book of the Year	Harvey Award	2020	Nominated
Grass	Best International Book	Harvey Award	2020	Winner
Grass	Best Non-Finction Comic Work	Ringo Award	2020	Nominated
Grass	Great Graphic Novel for Teens	ALA / YALSA	2020	Winner
Grass	Alex Award	ALA / YALSA	2020	Nominated
Grass	-	Krause Essay Prize	2020	Winner
Grass	Best Book	VLA Graphic Novel Diversity Award	2019	Winner
