= Dog Days (graphic novel) =

Graphic novel

Dog Days (개 Gae) is a 2021 graphic novel by Keum Suk Gendry-Kim.

It was translated into English by Janet Hong, with that version published in 2024 by Drawn and Quarterly.

== Plot ==
It is about a couple who buy a dog, move to the countryside, and then obtain more dogs. The woman in the relationship narrates the story. Terry Hong of Booklist described the woman as "Gendry-Kim’s stand-in".

The ending shows that a household that had mistreated a dog had obtained a new dog; Publishers Weekly stated that the ending therefore has "a wistful tone."

== Background ==
Gendry-Kim wanted to focus attention on mistreatment of dogs, especially in rural areas.

== Reception ==
Hong of Booklist gave the book a starred review.

Tom Batten of Library Journal described the work as "deeply moving".

== See also ==
Other graphic novels by Gendry-Kim:

- Grass
- The Naked Tree
- The Waiting
