= 1988 Harvey Award nominees and winners =

The very first Harvey Awards ceremony was presented on July 9, 1988, at the Chicago Comicon convention. This event took place at the Ramada O'Hare Hotel in Rosemont, Illinois. The Harvey Awards ceremony was a notable part of the convention, recognizing excellence in comic book creation and honoring outstanding creators and works from the comic book industry.

The nominated creators have been recognized by their peers for having produced some of the outstanding achievements in comics in 1987.

(Winners are in bold and marked with *)

Best Writer
Mike Baron, for Nexus (First)
Paul Chadwick, for Concrete (Dark Horse)
Gilbert Hernandez, for Love and Rockets (Fantagraphics)
William Messner-Loebs, for Jonny Quest (Comico)
Alan Moore, for Watchmen (DC) *

Best Artist or Penciller
Dave Gibbons, for Watchmen (DC) *
Michael Golden, for The 'Nam (Marvel)
Jaime Hernandez, for Love and Rockets (Fantagraphics)
Jerry Ordway, for The Adventures of Superman (DC)
Steve Rude, for Nexus (First)

Best Cartoonist (Writer/Artist)
Paul Chadwick, for Concrete (Dark Horse) *
Robert Crumb, for Hup! (Last Gasp)
Gilbert Hernandez, for Love and Rockets (Fantagraphics)
Jaime Hernandez, for Love and Rockets (Fantagraphics)
Scott McCloud, for Zot! (Eclipse)

Best Inker
Al Gordon, for Justice League International #1 (DC)
Karl Kesel, for Superman (DC)
Al Williamson, for Daredevil (Marvel) *

Best Letterer
Ken Bruzenak, for American Flagg (First) *
John Costanza, for Swamp Thing (DC)
Tom Orzechowski, for Uncanny X-Men (Marvel)

Best Colorist
Les Dorscheid, for Nexus (First)
John Higgins, for Watchmen (DC) *
Ken Steacy, for Space Ghost (Comico)
Special Award for Excellence in Production
Mister X, by [??] (Vortex)
Watchmen, by Alan Moore and Dave Gibbons (DC) *

Best New Series
The American, by Mark Verheiden, Chris Warner and Art Nichols (Dark Horse)
Concrete, by Paul Chadwick (Dark Horse) *
Hellblazer, by Jamie Delano and John Ridgway (DC)
Justice League International, by Keith Giffen, J. M. DeMatteis, Kevin Maguire and Al Gordon (DC)
Marshall Law, by Pat Mills and Kevin O'Neill (Marvel)
Yummy Fur, by Chester Brown (Vortex)

Best Continuing or Limited Series
Concrete, by Paul Chadwick (Dark Horse)
Love and Rockets, by Jaime Hernandez and Gilbert Hernandez (Fantagraphics)
Nexus, by Mike Baron, Steve Rude, Paul Smith and John Nyberg (First)
Swamp Thing, by Rick Veitch and Alfredo Alcala (DC)
Watchmen, by Alan Moore and Dave Gibbons (DC) *

Best Single Issue
Gumby Summer Fun Special #1, by Bub Burden and Art Adams (Comico)
Love and Rockets #19, by Jaime Hernandez and Gilbert Hernandez (Fantagraphics)
Love and Rockets #23, by Jaime Hernandez and Gilbert Hernandez (Fantagraphics)
Space Ghost Special, by Mark Evanier, Steve Rude, Willie Blyberg, and Ken Steacy (Comico)
Uncle Scrooge #219, by Don Rosa (Gladstone)
Watchmen #9, by Alan Moore and Dave Gibbons (DC) *

Best Graphic Album
Rio, by Doug Wildey (Comico)
Daredevil: Born Again, by Frank Miller and David Mazzucchelli (Marvel)
Batman: Son of the Demon, by Mike W. Barr and Jerry Bingham (DC)
Moebius album series, by Jean Giraud (Marvel)
Watchmen, by Alan Moore and Dave Gibbons (DC) *

Best American Edition of Foreign Material
Lone Wolf and Cub, by Kazuo Koike and Goseki Kojima (First)
Mai the Psychic Girl, by Kazuya Kudo and Ryoichi Ikegami (Eclipse)
Moebius album series, by Jean "Moebius" Giraud (Marvel) *

Best Reprint Project
Marvel Masterworks #1-#3, by Jack Kirby, Steve Ditko, Stan Lee, and various creators (Marvel)
The Spirit, by Will Eisner (Kitchen Sink) *
Steve Canyon Magazine, by Milton Caniff (Kitchen Sink)
