= Ordinary Victories =

Ordinary Victories (French: Le Combat ordinaire) is a comic book written and illustrated by Emmanuel Larcenet. The book won the Golden Wildcat (Fauve d'Or) award at the Angoulême International Comics Festival in 2004. Ordinary Victories tells the story Marc, a war photographer in his twenties, has some psychological problems and moves to countryside where he meets a veterinarian Emilie.
