= Park Wan-suh =

South Korean writer (1931–2011)

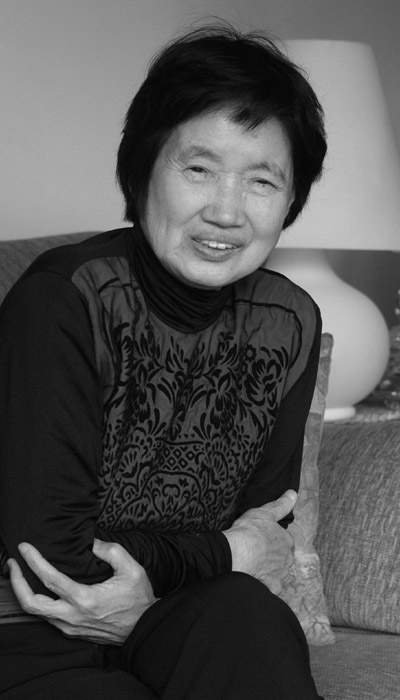
- South Korean writer
- Born: October 20, 1931
- Died: January 22, 2011 (aged 79)
- Occupation: Novelist
- Writing career
- Language: Korean
- Period: 1970–2011
- Notable awards: Geumgwan Order of Cultural Merit (2011)

Korean name
- Hangul: 박완서
- Hanja: 朴婉緖
- RR: Bak Wanseo
- MR: Pak Wansŏ

Park Wan-suh (Korean: 박완서; October 20, 1931 – January 22, 2011) was a South Korean writer.

== Life ==
Park Wan-suh (also Park Wan-seo, Park Wan-so, Park Wansuh, Pak Wan-so, Pak Wanso) was born in 1931 in Gaepung-gun in what is now Kaesong in North Korea. Park entered Seoul National University, but dropped out almost immediately after attending classes due to the outbreak of the Korean War and the death of her brother. During the war, Park was separated from her mother and elder brother by the North Korea army, which moved them to North Korea. She lived in the village of Achui, in Guri, outside Seoul until her death. Park died on the morning of January 22, 2011, suffering from cancer. The novelist Jung Yi-hyun wrote in her memorial letter, "You will know how much hope it is for the many female writers that the fact that there is a Park Wan-suh in Korean paragraphs."

== Work ==
Park published her first work, The Naked Tree, in 1970, when she was 40. Her œuvre quickly grew however and as of 2007 she had written fifteen novels, and 10 short story collections. Her work is "revered" in Korea and she has won many Korean literary awards including, in 1981 the Yi Sang Literary Prize, in 1990 the Korean Literature award, and in 1994 the Dong-in Literary Award. Park's work centers on families and biting critiques of the middle class. Perhaps the most vivid example of this is in her work The Dreaming Incubator in which a woman is forced to undergo a series of abortions until she can deliver a male child. Her best known works in Korea include Year of Famine in the City (도시의 흉년凶年), Swaying Afternoons, Warm Was the Winter That Year, and Are you Still Dreaming?.

In terms of general thematic concern, Park's fiction can be divided into three groups. The first deals with the tragic events of Korean War and its aftermath. Many of these stories reflect Park's own experiences. Born October 20, 1931 in Gaepung, Gyeonggi-do (before the division of the country; now Hwanghaebuk-do), Park entered the Korean Literature Department of the prestigious Seoul National University, but the eruption of the Korean War and the death of her older brother cut her studies short. The turbulence of the age she lived through is preserved in such works as The Naked Tree, Warm Was the Winter That Year (Geuhae gyeoureun ttatteuthaennae, 1983), Mother's Stake I (Eommaui malttuk I, 1980), and Mother's Garden (Eommaui tteul, 1981), depictions of families torn apart by the war and the heavy price the war continues to exact from its survivors. The archetypal figure in these works is that of the suffering mother who must make her way through life after losing both her husband and her son during the war. The mother in The Naked Tree, for example, is presented as an empty shell, whose inability to cope with her double loss robs her of the will to live. The place left vacant by the mother within the family must be taken up by her daughter instead; the burden for supporting the family rests squarely on her young shoulders. A certain density that characterizes The Naked Tree's prose intensifies the sense of suffocation that pervades the lives of post-war Koreans. While the daughter's active attempts to overcome the ordeal of her life provides a positive contrast to her mother's attitude of resignation, the work nonetheless reveals the severity of the damages, both psychical and material, sustained by the survivors of the war, and the difficulty of achieving genuine healing.

Park's works also target the hypocrisy and materialism of middle-class Koreans. The apartments of identical size, furnishings, and decorations that inscribe just as identical lives intent on gaining material gratification in Identical Apartments (Dalmeun bangdeul, 1974), a marriage of convenience that brings about atrocious results in A Reeling Afternoon (Huicheonggeorineun ohu, 1977), and schools where they prune, rather than educate, children in Children of Paradise (Naktoui aideul, 1978) all offer sharp denunciations of a bourgeois society. In these works, acts of individual avarice and snobbery are linked to larger social concerns such as the breakdown of age-old values and dissolution of the family. In turn, these phenomena are found to be symptomatic of the rapid industrialization of society in Korea after 1960s.

In 1980s, Park turned increasingly toward problems afflicting women in patriarchal society while continuing to engage with the lives of middle-class Koreans. Such works as The Beginning of Days Lived (Sarainneun nareui sijak, 1980), The Woman Standing (Seo inneun yeoja, 1985) and The Dreaming Incubator (Kkum kkuneun inkyubaeiteo, 1993) belong to this group. Through the eyes of a woman who has been forced to abort a daughter in order to produce a son, The Dreaming Incubator, in particular, critiques the male-centered organization of Korean society which reduces women to incubators for the male progeny. Park has also sketched the life of a woman merchant at the turn of the century in the historical novel Remembrance (Mimang 미망 未忘, 1985–90).

Park's translated novels include Who Ate up All the Shinga which sold some 1.5 million copies in Korean and was well-reviewed in English translation. Park is also published in The Red Room: Stories of Trauma in Contemporary Korea.

== Works in translation ==
- The Naked Tree

My Very Last Possession: And Other Stories
The Red Room: Stories of Trauma in Contemporary Korea
Sketch of the Fading Sun
Three Days in That Autumn
Weathered Blossom
Who Ate Up All the Shinga?: An Autobiographical Novel
Lonesome You
For That Which Cannot Be Restored

== Works in Korean (partial) ==
- 1970 The Naked Tree (나목)
  - Graphic novel version: The Naked Tree
- 1977 A Tottering Afternoon (휘청거리는 오후)
- 1979 Shade of Desire (욕망의 응달)
- 1982 Mother's Garden (엄마의 말뚝)
- 1983 Warm Was the Winter That Year (그해 겨울은 따뜻했네)
- 1985 Three Days in That Autumn (그 가을의 사흘동안)
- 1989 Year of Famine in the City (도시의 흉년)
- 1990 Unforgettable (미망)
- 1992 Who Ate Up All the Shinga? (그 많던 싱아는 누가 다 먹었을까?)
- 1993 The Dreaming Incubator (꿈꾸는 인큐베이터)
- 1998 Lonesome You (너무도 쓸쓸한 당신)
- 2000 A Very Old Joke (아주 오래된 농담)
- 2004 The Man's House (그 남자네 집)
- 2008 Friendly Ms. Bok-hee (친절한 복희씨)
- 2009 Three Wishes (세 가지 소원)
- 2016 Identical Apartments (닮은 방들)
- 2018 Park Wan-suh's words (박완서의 말)

== Awards ==
- 1980: Korean National Literature Award (한국문학작가상)
- 1981: Yi Sang Literary Award
- 1990: Republic of Korea Literature Prize (대한민국문학상; 大韓民國文學賞)
- 1993: Hyundae Munhak Award
- 1994: Dong-in Literary Award
- 1997: Daesan Literary Awards
- 2000: Inchon Award
- 2006: Ho-Am Prize in the Arts
- 2011: Order of Cultural Merit
