= The Naked Tree =

1970 novel by Park Wan-suh

The Naked Tree (Hangul: 나목, Hanja: 裸木, romanization: Namok) is a 1970 novel by Park Wan-suh.

It was the first novel made by the author. An English translation by Yu Young-nan was published in 1995 by Cornell University. This is also the first complete large work by the author to be given an English translation.

Kyung-a is the main character in the story, which occurs in the Korean War.

== Reception ==
Reviewer Yearn Hong Choi praised the English translation.

Stephen J. Epstein of the Victoria University of Wellington wrote that the book overall is a "welcome addition" and that the translation is overall "very readable and largely unobtrusive".

Michael J. Pettid of the University of Hawaii wrote that Park had a strong "technique" in developing the narrative in a way that a mystery book would develop, and that in summation the work is "captivating".

== Legacy ==
There is a Korean-language graphic novel adaptation, The Naked Tree.
