= The Waiting (graphic novel) =

Graphic novel by Keum Suk Gendry-Kim

The Waiting (Korean: 기다림, Gidarim) is a 2020 graphic novel by Keum Suk Gendry-Kim.

The English version was translated by Janet Hong and published by Drawn and Quarterly.

A portion of the story takes place in the present and involves a daughter named Jina and a mother, Song Gwija. Gwija is waiting to find a son who she has not seen since the Korean War, which had separated Korean people from one another. The story is based upon Gendry-Kim learning that her mother lost contact with her sister, who remained in North Korea, which meant that there was a possibility that Gendry-Kim had an aunt, still in North Korea, who she had not met.

== Reception ==
Thúy Đinh of National Public Radio described the work as "unflinching".

In 2021 the Washington Post ranked it as one of the "Best graphic novels of 2021".

== See also ==
Other graphic novels by Gendry-Kim:

- Dog Days
- Grass
- The Naked Tree
