= Grass (graphic novel) =

Graphic novel

Grass (Korean: 풀, Pul) is a 2017 Korean-language graphic novel, written and illustrated by Keum Suk Gendry-Kim.

It was translated into English by Janet Hong, with that version published in 2019 by Drawn and Quarterly. Grass received a Harvey Award for best international book, The Cartoonist Studio Prize for best Print Comic of the Year and the Big Other Book award for best graphic novel in 2019. Grass was featured on Best of the Year lists from both the New York Times and the Guardian. Grass has also been nominated for best book of the year Harvey Award as well as multiple Eisner Awards. In 2020 Keum Suk Gendry-Kim won the Krause Essay Prize from the University of Iowa. As of 2021 there are about 14 translations of the novel.

== Plot ==
Grass follows Lee Ok-Sun a.k.a. "Granny Lee", a woman who had been a "comfort woman" in World War II, returning to live in Korea. Grass covers Lee Ok-Sun's experiences both during and after the war. Grass shows Lee-Ok-Sun's experiences under Japanese occupation in Korea, her abduction and coercion into a comfort women at the age of 14, and how Lee overcame these difficulties. With the story shifting in time, as well as including excerpts of interviews between the author and Lee Ok-Sun. Alison Mandaville of California State University, Fresno wrote that it is "An oral history in comics form". A version of Gendry-Kim is in the story and tries to record an oral history of Ok-sun. Sean Rogers of the Globe and Mail wrote that "respectful distance" is used in the story.

== Creation ==
Grass was inspired by a short comic book called Secret based on survivor testimonies that Keum Suk Gendry-Kim worked on in 2013. While initially interested in the subject of comfort woman since 1993, Keum Suk Gendry-Kim works focus on centering Women in Korea. Working on Secret and then Grass Keum Suk Gendry-Kim had difficulty figuring out to depict such extreme violence without sensationalizing, while wanting to highlight the lived experiences of the victims. In an authors note Keum Suk Gendry-Kim explains despite international acknowledgement of comfort women, the subject still brings up controversy hence why it's important for stories such as Lee Ok-Sun's to be shared. Keum Suk Gendry-Kim included illustrations of former Korean Foreign Minister Yun Byung-se, Japanese Prime Minister Shinzo Abe and Korean President Park Geun-hye as a way of holding them accountable and to remind readers that comfort women are living history. Gendry-Kim stated that the reasoning for naming the novel Grass was because comfort women were trampled upon like grass.

The English version has a translator's note.

Gendry Keum works with Meok, traditional Korean inkstick and uses various materials such as brushes, twigs, sponges and rocks, Utilizing layers and heavy brush strokes to express character expressions and lavish landscapes. While Keum Suk Gendry-Kim majored in Western Painting, Tom Lathan of Times Literary Supplement stated that the artwork has Eastern and Western influences.

Lee Ok-Sun also spelled Lee Ok-Seun passed away on May 11, 2025.

== Themes ==
Focusing on Lee Ok-Sun's overcoming and being changed by her wartime experiences, Grass emphasizes themes of Antiwar and the importance of peace. In the novel Gendry-Kim often reflects on her documentative behavior as possibly exploitative. Grass addresses themes of gendered violence, poverty, trauma and injustice and works to open up conversation subjects such as reparations for survivors and crimes against humanity that are often brushed aside.

== Reception ==
The Asian Pacific American Librarians Association (APALA) stated that Gendry-Kim "conscientiously eschews sensationalizing or providing graphic representations of violent scenes."

Thomas L. Batten of Library Journal wrote that the artwork is "exquisite" and that the narrative is "thoughtful".

== See also ==
Other graphic novels by Gendry-Kim:

- Dog Days
- The Naked Tree
- The Waiting
