= Koreana (magazine) =

Multi-lingual quarterly Korean magazine

- Koreana in English and Korean
- Editor-in-chief: Jeon Eun-kyung
- Frequency: Quarterly
- Publisher: Song Guido
- First issue: 8 August 1977; 48 years ago
- Company: Korea Foundation (KF)
- Country: South Korea
- Language: Arabic, Chinese, English, French, German, Indonesian, Japanese, Korean, Russian, Spanish, Vietnamese
- Website: www.koreana.or.kr/koreana/main.do
- ISSN: 1016-0744
- OCLC: 1783175

Koreana is the Korea Foundation’s quarterly, which is published in 11 languages to promote Korean arts and culture around the world.

== History ==
Koreana was initially launched as an English-language magazine in the fall of 1987. The first Japanese edition was issued the following year, and in 1993, soon after South Korea and China established diplomatic relations, the Chinese edition was introduced. The Spanish and French editions followed soon, and as the hallyu (Korean Wave) began to spread at the turn of the new millennium, Koreana responded to the rising global interest in Korean culture by launching Arabic, German, Indonesian, and Russian editions. With the emergence of digital media, Koreana further broadened its relationships through webzine and e-book services. Most recently, Vietnamese and Korean editions were made available as webzines to further diversify the channels of intercultural communication with netizens around the world.

Koreana has dealt with a broad spectrum of Korean arts and culture, ranging from Paleolithic relics to contemporary media and installation art; from the splendid royal court culture of the Joseon Dynasty to today’s street art and fashion, from literature to film and various other cultural genres. In doing so, the magazine has helped people around the world to appreciate the universality and distinctiveness of Korean culture and also contributed to the mission of the Korea Foundation: “Connecting People, Bridging the World.”

Koreana is distributed to universities, libraries, museums, research centers and various other cultural and art institutions in about 150 countries.

=== Anniversaries ===
During a reception celebrating the publication of Koreana's 100th issue in 2012, Mark C. Minton, President of the Korea Society, declared, “There is no better publication on Korean culture and the arts. The articles are extremely informative and the photographs are beautiful.” In 2017, Koreana marked its 30th anniversary by publishing a first-ever Korean language print issue (see inset photo). The quarterly's past and current issues are freely accessible online as webzines. Alternatively, readers from around the world can subscribe for one to three years and have the magazine mailed to them.
