= Emmanuel Larcenet =

French cartoonist (born 1969)

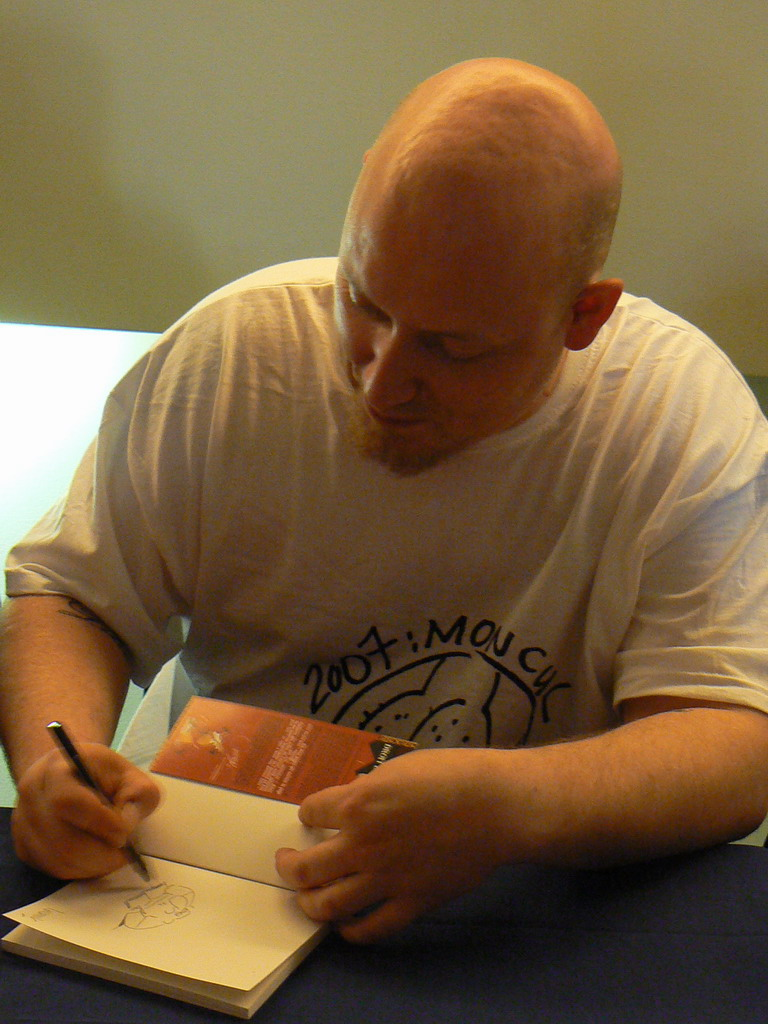
Larcenet in 2007

Emmanuel Larcenet, known as Manu Larcenet (born 6 May 1969) is a French cartoonist. He worked with Fluide Glacial magazine from 1995 to 2006 and with Spirou magazine from 1997 to 2004. He has also founded the French publisher Les Rêveurs in 1998. Since 2000, he mostly works with Dargaud.

== Biography ==
Emmanuel Larcenet, also known as Manu Larcenet, was born in Issy-les-Moulineaux, Hauts-de-Seine, France. He studied graphic art at the Sèvres lycée and then went on to art school. While spending time as a singer in a punk-rock band, he published his first drawings in comics and rock fanzines. In October 1994, he was published in the French magazine Fluide Glacial (issue #220) with L'Expert comptable de la jungle, a first story rapidly followed by other complete ones, and republished later in comic books, in the series Soyons fous, La Loi des séries and Bill Baroud. Meanwhile, Larcenet was also actively working for Les rêveurs de rune. For this magazine and label specialising in fantasy, he created games called Raoul, D'ac Raoul, and, in 1997, Dallas cowboy.

From that year on, alone first and then with Gaudelette, he worked for Spirou magazine, publishing Pedro le Coati, among others. In 1998, still for Dupuis but with Jean-Michel Thiriet, he created La vie est courte. His other drawings were independently collected and published in 1996 and 1998 in 30 millions d'imbéciles and Ni dieu, ni maître, ni croquettes by Glénat.

In 2000, he met Guy Vidal who would become responsible for the label Poisson Pilote at Dargaud. He became friends with him and started contributing to the Poisson Pilote label, drawing Les cosmonautes du futur based on a script by Lewis Trondheim, and later on Les Entremondes with his brother Patrice Larcenet. In June 2001, he left Paris for Lyon, keeping contact with Vidal. On a scenario by Jean-Yves Ferri, he participated in Le retour à la terre. Finally, he signed alone his next books : the Une aventure rocambolesque de..., Le combat ordinaire (this last one being granted an award by the Prize for Best Album at the Angoulême International Comics Festival) and Nic Oumouk series.

In 2024, Larcenet adapted The Road: A Graphic Novel Adaptation, which is based on Cormac McCarthy's The Road and was published in English translation by Abrams ComicArts the same year.

== Bibliography ==
- 30 millions d'imbéciles: Encyclopédie à poils et à vapeur (with Patrice Larcenet) (Glénat, 1996)
- La loi des séries (Fluide Glacial, 1997)
- Dallas cowboy (Les rêveurs de runes, 1997)
- Ni dieu ni maître ni croquettes (with Patrice Larcenet) (Glénat, 1998)
- Presque (Les rêveurs de runes, 1998)
- A l'ouest de l'infini (drawings by Julien Solé) (Fluide Glacial, 1999)
- On fera avec (Les rêveurs de runes, 2000)
- La vie est courte (Dupuis, 1998–2000)
  - Jusqu'à présent (with Jean-Michel Thiriet) (1999)
  - Profitons-en (with Jean-Michel Thiriet) (1998)
  - Rien ne va plus (with Jean-Michel Thiriet) (2000)
- L'artiste de la famille (Les rêveurs de runes, 2001)
- Les superhéros injustement méconnus (Fluide Glacial, 2001)
- Les entremondes (Dargaud, 2000–2001)
  - Lazarr (with Patrice Larcenet) (2000)
  - Les eaux lourdes (with Patrice Larcenet) (2001)
- Soyons fous (Fluide Glacial, 1996–2002)
  - Volume 1 (1996)
  - Dans la dignité (2002)
- Bill Baroud (Fluide Glacial, 1998–2002)
  - Espion (1998)
  - A la rescousse (1999)
  - La dernière valse (2000)
  - La jeunesse de Bill Baroud (2002)
- Pedro le coati (Dupuis, 2001–2002)
  - Volume 1 (with Gaudelette) (2001)
  - Volume 2 (with Gaudelette) (2002)
- Les cosmonautes du futur (Dargaud, 2000–2004)
  - Volume 1 (with Lewis Trondheim) (2000)
  - Le retour (with Lewis Trondheim) (2001)
  - Résurrection (with Lewis Trondheim) (2004)
- Une aventure rocambolesque de... (Dargaud, 2002–2004)
  - Sigmund Freud: Le temps de chien (2002)
  - Vincent Van Gogh: La ligne de Front (2004)
  - La légende de Robin des bois (2003 – added to the serie in 2009)
  - Soldat Inconnu – Crevaisons (with Daniel Casanave, 2009).
- Les pénibles aventures de Critixman le superhéros super suffisant, (Les Rêveurs, 2006)
- Donjon parade (Delcourt, 2000–2007)
  - Un donjon de trop (with Joann Sfar and Lewis Trondheim) (2000)
  - Le sage du ghetto (with Joann Sfar and Lewis Trondheim) (2001)
  - Le jour des crapauds (with Joann Sfar and Lewis Trondheim) (2002)
  - Des fleurs et des marmots (with Joann Sfar and Lewis Trondheim) (2004)
  - Technique Grogro (with Joann Sfar and Lewis Trondheim) (2007)
- Nic Oumouk (Dargaud, 2005–2007)
  - Total Souk pour Nic Oumouk (2005)
  - La France a peur de Nic Oumouk (2007)
- De mon chien comme preuve irréfutable de l'inexistence d'un dieu omniprésent, (6 pieds sous terre, 2007)
- Le retour à la terre (with Jean-Yves Ferri, Dargaud, 2002–2008)
  - La vraie vie (2002)
  - Les projets (2003)
  - Le vaste monde (2005)
  - Le déluge (2006)
  - Les révolutions, (2008)
- Le combat ordinaire (Dargaud, 2003–2008)
  - Le combat ordinaire (2003)
  - Les quantités négligeables (2004)
  - Ce qui est précieux (2006)
  - Planter des clous (2008)
- L'Angélus de Midi (Les Rêveurs, 2008)
  - Volume 1, (2008)
- Blast (Dargaud, 2009–2014)
  - Grasse Carcasse, (2009)
  - L'Apocalypse selon Saint Jacky, (2011)
  - La Tête la première, (2012)
  - Pourvu que les Bouddhistes se trompent, (2014)
- Chez Francisque (with Yan Lindingre, Fluide Glacial vol. 1 and 2, Dargaud, vol. 3 and 4 – 2006–2010))
  - Tome 1, (2006)
  - Tome 2, (2007)
  - Une année vue du zinc, (2009)
  - Tout fout le camp, (2010)
- Le sens de la vis (with Jean-Yves Ferri, Les Rêveurs, 2007–2010)
  - Le sens de la vis, (2007)
  - Tracer le cercle, (2010)
- Peu de gens savent, (Les Rêveurs, 2010)
- La Route (The Road: A Graphic Novel Adaptation) (Dargaud, 2024)

== Awards ==
- 2001: nominated for the Humour Award and the Best French Comic Book Award at the Angoulême International Comics Festival, France
- 2002: nominated for the Best Artwork Award at the Angoulême International Comics Festival
- 2003: nominated for the Audience Award at the Angoulême International Comics Festival
- 2004: Best Comic Book Award at the Angoulême International Comics Festival

– nominated for the Audience Award at the Angoulême International Comics Festival

- 2006: nominated for Best Comic (French language) and Best Story at the Prix Saint-Michel, Belgium
- 2010: French Comics Library Prize for Best Comic Book for the first volume of Blast.
