= Ho-min Sohn =

South Korean linguist (born 1933)

- Born: 1933 (age 92–93); Suncheon, Zenranan Province, Korea, Empire of Japan
- Education: Seoul National University; University of Hawaiʻi at Mānoa

Korean name
- Hangul: 손호민
- RR: Son Homin
- MR: Son Homin

Ho-min Sohn (Note: "Ho-Min Sohn" is used in his 2001 book The Korean Language, but his university profile gives "Ho-min Sohn".) (Korean: 손호민; born 1933) is a South Korean linguist.

Sohn was born in Suncheon, Zenranan Province, Korea, Empire of Japan. He graduated from Seoul National University (SNU) with a bachelor's degree in 1956 and a master's degree in linguistics in 1965. He graduated from the University of Hawaiʻi at Mānoa (UH) with a Ph.D. in linguistics in 1969. He began teaching at UH in 1971. By 1980 he was a professor in the Department of East Asian Studies. He became the director of UH's Korean Studies Center in 2004.

Sohn authored over twenty textbooks for the Korean language.

He received a Presidential Citation from South Korea in 1997. In 2011, he received the Korea Foundation Award, given by the Korea Foundation.
