= Korea Foundation =

South Korean diplomacy non-profit

The Korea Foundation
- Founded: 1991
- Type: Non-profit Public Diplomacy Organization
- Location: 55 Sinjungno, Seogwipo-si, Jeju Island, 63566, South Korea
- Region served: Worldwide
- Leader: Dr. SONG Guido, President
- Website: www.kf.or.kr

Korean name
- Hangul: 한국국제교류재단
- Hanja: 韓國國際交流財團
- RR: Hanguk gukje gyoryu jaedan
- MR: Han'guk kukche kyoryu chaedan

The Korea Foundation (KF; Korean: 한국국제교류재단) is a non-profit public diplomacy organization established in 1991 to promote a better understanding of Korea and strengthen friendships in the international community. The foundation carries out various projects for exchange between the South Korea and foreign countries to cultivate mutual understanding.

== History ==
Amid the Republic of Korea's rapid economic growth from the late 1970s to the 1980s as well as the country's concomitant democratization and the upheaval in the international community after the Cold War, an overhaul of Korea's foreign policy strategy became inevitable. Having demonstrated its enhanced capabilities by successfully hosting the 10th Asian Games in 1986 and the 24th Summer Olympics in 1988 in Seoul had a lasting impact on how the world viewed Korea. Subsequently, the idea for an international exchange organization was born that would serve as a single point of contact and support exchange projects in various fields. In September 1989, the Korean parliament began an official debate about the establishment of the Korea Foundation, which eventually led to the adoption of the Korea Foundation Act on December 14, 1991.

== Organization ==
The Korea Foundation is affiliated with Korea's Ministry of Foreign Affairs, which oversees three affiliate organizations – the Korea Foundation, the Overseas Korean Foundation (OKF), and the Korea International Cooperation Agency (KOICA). All three are dedicated to advancing Korea's diplomatic relations with the rest of the world. The Korea Foundation currently has 4 bureaus, under which 130 staff work in 13 departments. Its headquarters and the KF Global Center are located in Seoul. In addition, the foundation maintains 8 overseas offices on 3 continents, including in Washington DC, Los Angeles, Berlin, Moscow, Beijing, Tokyo, Hanoi, and Jakarta.

=== Establishment of the Korea–Central Asia Cooperation Forum Secretariat ===
In 2017, the Korea Foundation launched two new initiatives. In July 2017, the Korea-Central Asia Cooperation Forum Secretariat commenced its work. It serves as a platform for the nations of Kazakhstan, Korea, Kyrgyzstan, Tajikistan, Turkmenistan, and Uzbekistan from which to develop practical and future-oriented mutual cooperation. In doing so, it aims to aid the implementation and diversification of initiatives handled by the Korea–Central Asia Cooperation Forum, the multilateral consultative group launched in 2007. The Secretariat is coordinated by the Korea Foundation, which oversees projects in a variety of fields, including medicine, tourism, arts and culture, youth leadership forums, and water management.

=== Establishment of the ASEAN Culture House (ACH) ===
Since September 2017, the Korea Foundation is in charge of operating the newly established ASEAN Culture House (ACH) in Busan. The vision of this venue is to provide a lively platform to enhance Koreans’ understanding of the cultures and societies of ASEAN countries. The ACH is a venue for cultural exchanges and networking between Koreans and ASEAN residents in Korea, and facilitates collaboration between Korea's local and regional governments in introducing ASEAN culture. The plan to establish the ACH was one of the outcomes of the ASEAN-ROK Commemorative Summit held in Busan in 2014 to celebrate the 25th Anniversary of the ASEAN-ROK Dialogue Relations.

=== Relocation of Korea Foundation headquarters ===
In July 2018, the Korea Foundation relocated its main office to Seogwipo, Jeju Province, pursuant to the Special Act on the Construction of and Support of Innovation Cities Following Relocation of Public Agencies.

== Activities ==
=== Support for Korean studies ===
The Korea Foundation extends support to international universities for the establishment of Korean studies professorships, employment of contract faculty members, and appointment of visiting professors to advance Korea-related education and scholarship. Under an array of programs, including fellowships for graduate and postdoctoral studies, as well as fellowships for field research and Korean language training, the foundation assists graduate students and scholars in their research endeavors. The foundation also organizes Korean studies workshops for non-Korean educators to aid their Korea-related classroom instruction and develop cooperative networks. In addition, the foundation implements various special projects to promote Korean studies and foster the next generation of Koreanists. The foundation has supported the Korea Institute at Harvard University in Cambridge, Massachusetts; the Center for Korean Studies at the University of California, Los Angeles in the US; the School of Oriental and African Studies, University of London in the UK; the Free University of Berlin in Germany; among others. In addition, it has supported the establishment of Korean studies professorships at around 120 international universities and over 6,000 scholars and students who conducted research on Korea under the foundation's fellowship programs.

=== Global networking ===
The Korea Foundation invites distinguished individuals to enable them to obtain firsthand knowledge and experiences about Korea. It also implements exchange programs for next-generation leaders and youths to facilitate future-oriented people-to-people relationships. In addition, the foundation organizes and supports international forums, which serve as a regular channel of dialogue at the non-governmental level. It also provides grants to important think tanks and research institutes conducting Korea-related policy research, including the Brookings Institution, the Center for Strategic and International Studies (CSIS), and the Woodrow Wilson International Center for Scholars, all in Washington, D.C., as well as the International Institute for Strategic Studies (IISS) in London, among others.

=== Arts and cultural exchange ===
The Korea Foundation organizes and supports a wide variety of performances and exhibitions presenting Korean culture and arts. It also offers support for cultural programs held at the Korean sections of prestigious international museums in order to make Korean culture more accessible to global audiences. To help foreign residents in Korea acquire a better understanding of Korea and provide the Korean public with an opportunity to learn more about foreign cultures, the foundation hosts a variety of arts and cultural events through its KF Global Center and the KF Gallery. Since its inception, the foundation organized over 1,000 exhibitions, performances and festivals, and helped establish 28 Korean galleries at prominent overseas museums, including the British Museum in London; the Metropolitan Museum of Art in New York and the Guimet Museum in Paris; among others.

=== Publishing and multimedia resources ===
The Korea Foundation supports the publication of Korea-related books in foreign languages, and the acquisition of Korea-related materials and multimedia content by universities, libraries, and research institutes around the world. The foundation also supports the airing of Korean TV dramas and films to global viewers to deepen their understanding of Korea and boost the popularity of contemporary Korean culture. Its efforts to introduce Korean culture, history and society to the global community include the publication of a quarterly magazine, titled Koreana. Initially launched as an English-language magazine, Koreana’s print issue is now available in a total of nine languages, including Arabic, Chinese, English, French, German, Indonesian, Japanese, Russian, and Spanish and is distributed in some 160 countries.

==== Koreana ====
The Korea Foundation's quarterly, Koreana, has dealt with a broad spectrum of Korean arts and culture, ranging from Paleolithic relics to contemporary media and installation art; from the splendid royal court culture of the Joseon Dynasty to today’s street art and fashion, from literature to film and various other cultural genres. In doing so, the magazine has helped people around the world to appreciate the universality and distinctiveness of Korean culture and also contributed to the mission of the Korea Foundation: “Connecting People, Bridging the World.” In 2017, Koreana marked its 30th anniversary by publishing a first-ever Korean language print issue. The quarterly's past and current issues are freely accessible online as webzines. Alternatively, readers from around the world can subscribe for one to three years and have the magazine mailed to them.

== Korea Foundation Award ==
Established in 2008, the Korea Foundation Award acknowledges the achievements of those who have dedicated themselves to raise awareness of Korea and enhance international friendship. In 2017, the award was presented to Kyong-hee Lee, chief editor of quarterly magazine Koreana. Past awardees include Martina Deuchler, Emerita Professor of Korean Studies at the School of Oriental and African Studies (SOAS), University of London; John Duncan, Director of the Center for Korean Studies at the University of California, Los Angeles (UCLA); Ho-min Sohn, Professor of Korean Language and Linguistics at the Department of East Asian Languages and Literatures at the University of Hawaii at Manoa; the Chinese People's Association for Friendship with Foreign Countries; and Hartmut Koschyk, Co-Chairman of Korea-Germany Forum and Head of Germany-Korea Parliamentary Friendship Association.

== President ==
Dr. SONG Guido (November 3, 2025 – present)

- B.A. Spanish, Hankuk University of Foreign Studies (HUFS), Seoul, Korea
- M.A. Political Science, Complutense University of Madrid (UCM)
- Ph.D. Political Science, Complutense University of Madrid (UCM)

== Former presidents ==
- Hyeok-in Yu (Jan. 3 – Oct. 9, 1992)
- Chu-whan Son (Oct. 26, 1992 – Dec. 29, 1994)
- Chang-yoon Choi (Dec. 31, 1994 – Mar. 30, 1996)
- Jung-won Kim (Apr. 29, 1996 – Feb. 24, 1998)
- Joung-binn Lee (Apr. 10, 1998 – Jan. 14, 2000)
- In-ho Lee (Feb. 21, 2000 – Dec. 29, 2003)
- In-hyuk Kwon (Jan. 6, 2004 – Jan. 5, 2007)
- Sung-joon Yim (Feb. 27, 2007 – Feb. 26, 2010)
- Byung-Kook Kim (Jun. 14, 2010 – Mar. 1, 2012)
- Woosang Kim (Mar. 1, 2012 – May. 10, 2013)
- Hyun-seok Yu (May 13, 2013 – May 11, 2016)
- Sihyung Lee (May 12, 2016 – Sep. 15, 2019)
- Geun Lee (2019 – 2022)
- Gheewhan Kim (2022 – 2025)
