= Nanette McGuinness =

American soprano and literary translator

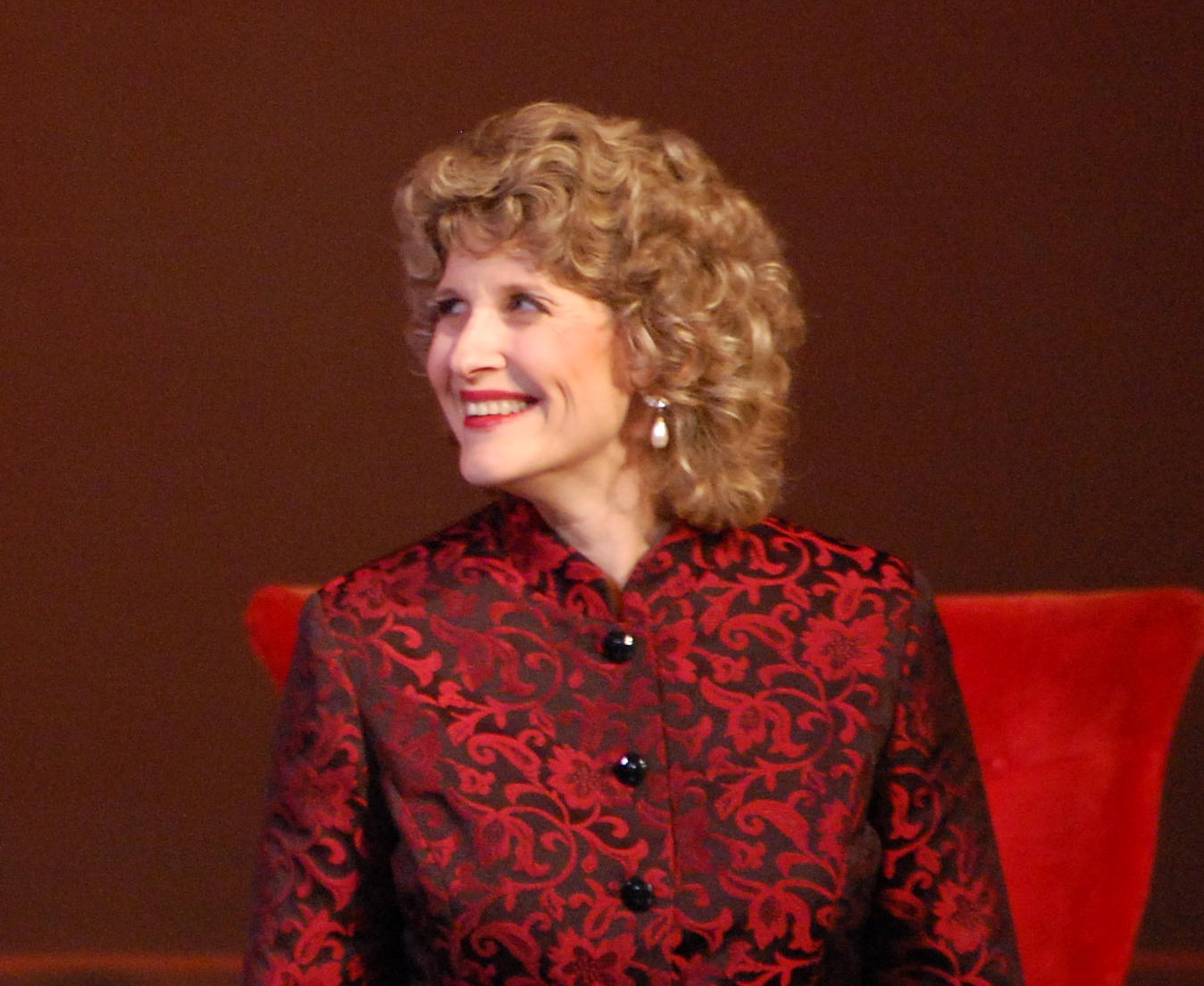
- Born: Boston, Massachusetts
- Education: PhD
- Alma mater: Cornell University; University of California, Berkeley
- Occupations: Vocalist; Translator
- Awards: Gold Medal, Global Music Awards

Nanette McGuinness is an American soprano and literary translator. She is also the co-founder of the Ensemble for These Times, and is a two-time silver medalist and 2018 gold medalist at the Global Music Awards.

== Early life ==
Nanette McGuinness was born Nanette Michèle Cooper in Boston, Massachusetts. She spent much of her youth in Houston, before attending Cornell University where she earned a B.A. in music. She later graduated from Holy Names College, where she earned an M.M. in Vocal Performance and the University of California at Berkeley, where she earned her PhD in musicology.

== Music career ==
McGuinness began her music career as a soprano in both operatic and chamber music performances. She has been featured on four albums released on Centaur Records, Fabulous Femmes (music by 19th and 20th century women composers) with the Athena Trio and Benedetto Vinaccesi: the Solo Cantatas with the Vinaccesi Ensemble.

McGuinness is the vocalist for the trio Ensemble for These Times, alongside pianist Dale Tsang and cellist Anne Lerner-Wright. Formed in 2007 Ensemble for These Times plays both works by living composers, including 56 out of 275 submitted via an international "Call for Scores" in 2016 and also relevant but forgotten works from the twentieth century, including composers exiled or killed in the Holocaust. In 2016 the group also released the album Jewish Music & Poetry Project: Surviving – Women's Words, based upon their performance project that set poems written by women survivors of the Holocaust to music. The album was awarded a silver medal at the 2016 Global Music Awards. Other members of the group have included composer David Garner and guest artists such as violinist Dawn Harms, for their stage show The Guernica Project, which commemorated the 80th anniversary of Pablo Picasso's work Guernica. In 2018 McGuinness's album The Hungarians: from Rozsa to Justus received the gold medal from the Global Music Awards.

In 2019, the ensemble received the second place for Chamber Music Performance by The American Prize, as well as being finalists for their Ernst Bacon Memorial Award. In 2020 their album Once/Memory/Night: Paul Celan, in honor of Celan's centennial, was released and won a silver medal in the 2020 Global Music Awards. Of the recording, The Whole Note wrote that, “The Ensemble’s performance is both poised and haunting, and is raised to a rarefied realm by lustrous and soaring, songful recitatives executed by the inimitable Nanette McGuinness.” The journal Textura also stated that McGuinness “gives powerful voice to Celan's texts”. McGuinness has also been named the Artistic Executive Director of the group. In 2021, Ensemble for These Times won The American Prize Prize for Chamber Music Performance.

== Writing ==
McGuinness is also a translator, having translated about sixty published books and graphic novels from French, Italian, German, and Spanish into English for children and adults, including the Geronimo Stilton Graphic Novel series with Papercutz and California Dreamin': Cass Elliott Before the Mamas & the Papas with First Second Books, Luisa: Now and Then, A House Without Windows, and For Justice: The Serge and Beate Klarsfeld Story. Her translation of Luisa received the Stonewall Book Awards-Barbara Gittings Literature Award, and was an honor book at the 2020 GLLI YA Book in Translation Awards.
