= Harvey Awards =

American comic book award

- Awarded for: Achievement in comic books
- Location: Chicago Comicon (1988); Dallas Fantasy Fair (1989–1995); WonderCon (1997–1999); Pittsburgh Comicon (2000–2002); MoCCA Festival (2004–2005); Baltimore Comic-Con (2006–2016); New York Comic Con (2017–present)
- Country: United States
- Presented by: Harvey Awards Executive Committee
- First award: 1988; 38 years ago
- Website: https://www.harveyawards.com

The Harvey Awards are given for achievement in comic books. Named for writer-artist Harvey Kurtzman, the Harvey Awards were founded by Gary Groth in 1988, president of the publisher Fantagraphics, to be a successor to the Kirby Awards, which were discontinued in 1987.

The Harvey Awards are now nominated by the Harvey Awards Nomination Committee. The winners are selected by an open vote among comic-book professionals. The Harveys are no longer affiliated with Fantagraphics. The Harvey Awards Executive Committee is made up of unpaid volunteers, and the Awards are financed through sponsorships.

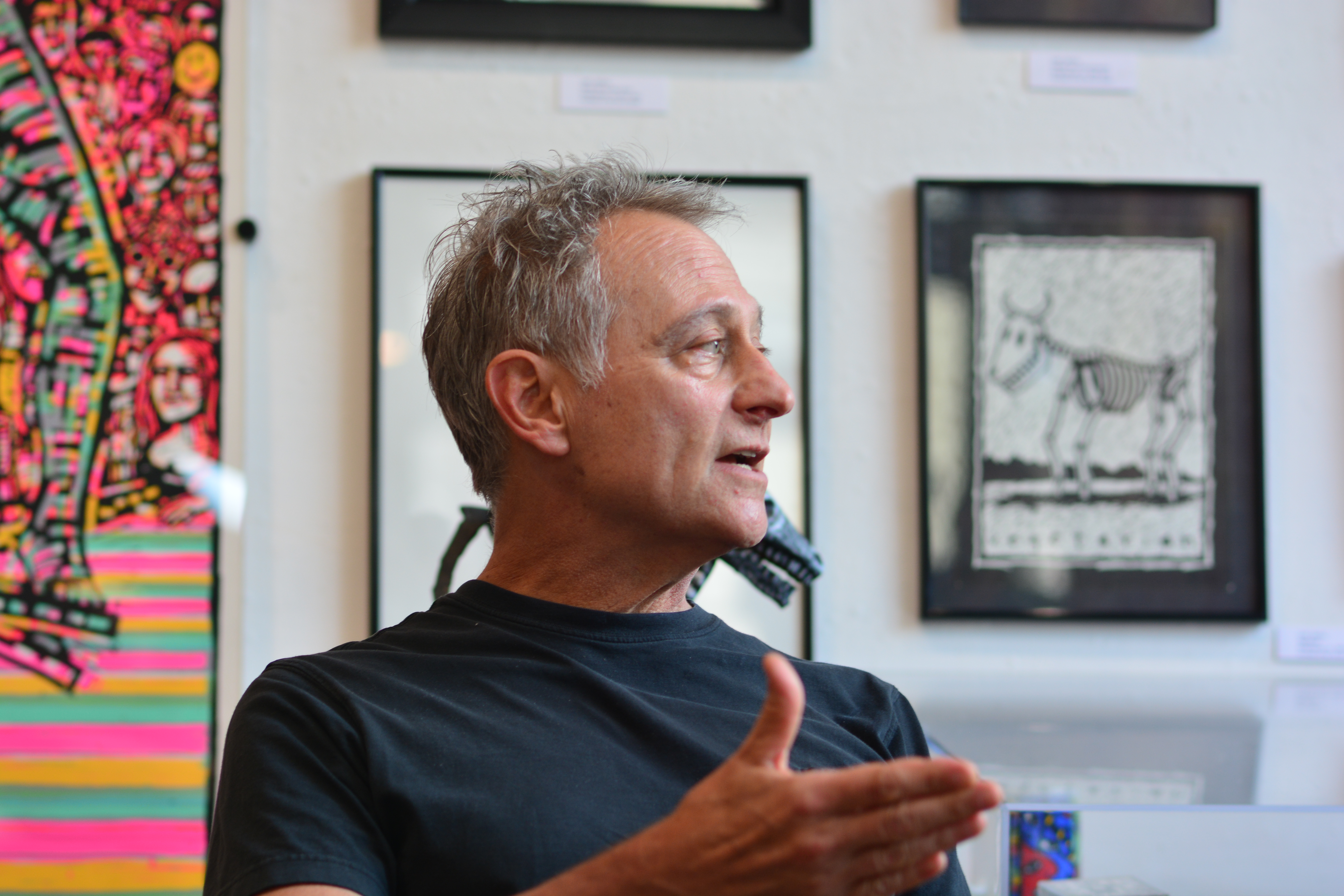
Comic publisher Gary Groth, founder of the Harvey Awards

Since their inception, the awards have been hosted at a string of comic book conventions, starting at the Chicago Comicon, and subsequently moving to the Dallas Fantasy Fair, WonderCon, the Pittsburgh Comicon, the MoCCA Festival, the Baltimore Comic-Con, and currently the New York Comic Con.

== History ==
The Harvey Awards were created as an industry award voted on entirely by comics professionals (as opposed to awards such as the Comics Buyer's Guide Fan Awards and the Eagle Awards, which were also voted on by fans). The new awards established several categories that were new from their predecessor the Kirby Awards, including awards for inking, lettering, coloring, and production design.

The Harvey Awards were initially sponsored by Fantagraphics, the Texas-based retailer Lone Star Comics, and the Eastern Region Comic Book Retailers Association (ERCBRA). Fantagraphics established the relationship with Harvey Kurtzman, designed the ballots, and compiled a mailing list of more than 1,000 comics professionals. Employees at Lone Star Comics were in charge of tabulating the ballots.

The nominations for the first Harvey Awards were announced in May 1988, and the awards were presented at the Chicago Comicon in July 1988.

The Dallas Fantasy Fair hosted the awards from 1989 until the Fair's demise in 1996. The 1993 Awards presentation took place shortly after Kurtzman's death; weekend events at the convention were geared toward raising money to keep the awards going. Because the Dallas Fantasy Fair was cancelled at the last minute in July 1996, the awards banquet/presentation was also cancelled. The awards were later mailed out to the recipients.

WonderCon hosted the awards from 1997 to 1999. The 2000–2002 awards were presented at the Pittsburgh Comicon, with Evan Dorkin serving as master of ceremonies. Jeff Smith was the keynote speaker of the 2000 awards. Frank Miller gave the keynote speech at the 2001 award ceremony, in which he vilified the comic book speculating industry, in particular Wizard magazine. He ended his speech by tearing up a copy of Wizard. Tony Millionaire gave the keynote speech at the 2002 awards ceremony. In 2003, due to a cancellation by scheduled keynote speaker Neil Gaiman, funding shortages forced the cancellation of that year's ceremony and banquet (which had been scheduled for the Pittsburgh Comicon). The award winners were announced at the convention.

In 2004 and 2005, the presentation was held at the Museum of Comic and Cartoon Art MoCCA Festival in New York City.

In 2006 the awards' presentation was moved to Baltimore Comic-Con, where it was subsequently held annually through 2016. During this era, Paul McSpadden served as the Harvey Awards administrator.

Beginning on October 7, 2017, the Harvey Award ceremony was moved to the New York Comic Con. The first year, only a small reception honoring the legacy of Harvey Kurtzman was held, and no nominations or voting took place. Darwyn Cooke was posthumously awarded Harvey Awards Hall of Fame induction, presented by Adam Kubert and accepted by Cooke's widow Marsha.

In 2018, the 30th anniversary of the awards was celebrated with a full ceremony held during the convention. Beginning that year, the Harvey Awards were revised to six new categories for the main awards and three possible Special Awards. The main award nominations go to works instead of individuals. The nomination process was also revamped to be done by a selection committee instead of an open vote. Final selection for the main awards was still done by an open vote by industry professionals.

In 2019, the Harvey Awards gala was held on October 4, at an invite only gala in New York City during New York Comic Con. In addition to announcing the winners in the individual nominated categories, seven creators were inducting into the Harvey Awards Hall of Fame including Mike Mignola and Alison Bechdel. The inclusion of an additional five creators inducted posthumously, Will Elder, Jack Davis, Marie Severin, John Severin, and Ben Oda, served to correct past omissions. In regards to these additional inductees, the New York Times quoted Harvey Awards co-chair John Lind as explaining “We decided to balance the induction class with some of the past creators who may have been overlooked.”

In October 2020, the Harvey Awards were presented during a virtual ceremony broadcast "as part of New York Comic Con and MCM Comic Con’s Metaverse, hosted by Vivek Tiwary and featuring appearances from Gene Luen Yang, Neil Gaiman, Jill Thompson and Damon Lindelof".

== Categories ==
The Harvey Awards are awarded in the following categories:

=== Current awards ===
As of 2024, awards are presented in seven main categories:

- Book of the Year
- Digital Book of the Year
- Best Children's Book
- Best Young Adult Book
- Best Adaptation From a Comic Book/Graphic Novel
- Best Manga
- Best International Book

Special Awards chosen by the Harvey Awards Executive Committee:

- Harvey Hall of Fame Award
- International Spotlight Award
- Comics Industry Pioneer Award

=== Previous awards ===
- Best Children's or Young Adult Book
- Best European Book
- Best Writer
- Best Artist or Penciller
- Best Cartoonist (Writer/Artist)
- Best Inker
- Best Letterer
- Best Colorist
- Best Cover Artist
- Best New Series
- Best Continuing or Limited Series
- Best Single Issue or Story
- Best Graphic Album (discontinued after 1990)
- Best Graphic Album of Original Work
- Best Graphic Album of Previously Published Work
- Best Anthology
- Best Syndicated Strip or Panel
- Best Biographical, Historical, or Journalistic Presentation
- Best American Edition of Foreign Material
- Best Domestic Reprint Project
- Best New Talent
- Best Online Comics Work
- Special Award for Humor
- Special Award for Excellence in Production/Presentation
- The Hero Initiative Lifetime Achievement Award
- The Jack Kirby Hall of Fame

== Ceremonies, winners, nominees ==
- List of all Harvey Award nominees by year
- 1988 Harvey Award nominees and winners

== See also ==
- Alley Award
- Bill Finger Award
- Eagle Award
- Eisner Award
- Inkpot Award
- Kirby Award
- National Comics Award
- Russ Manning Award
- Shazam Award
