= Benoît Mouchart =

French writer (born 1976)

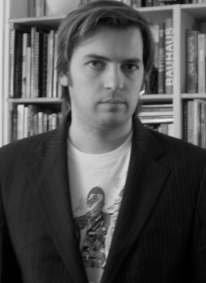
- Born: July 20, 1976 (age 50); Versailles, France
- Occupations: Author, curator

Benoît Mouchart (born 1976 in Versailles) is a French writer and curator. From 2003 to 2013, he was artistic director of the cultural programming of Angoulême International Comics Festival, in France.

== Biography ==
After having obtained in 1999 a masters of Literature in the Sorbonne (Paris IV), he becomes French professor for high school programme, intend to devote itself to journalism. Critic (Bang! and 9e art), he contributes its share to the special issues devoted to the comics of the French magazines Géo, Télérama, Science et Vie and Beaux-arts magazine. He is also the author of several books, of which an investigation into the ghost writer of the Belgian school Jacques Van Melkebeke and, in collaboration with François Rivière, a biography of the creator of "Blake and Mortimer", Edgar P. Jacobs. Since 2004, he animates the two-monthly meetings "the territories of the comic strip" for the BPI of the Pompidou Centre. With Areski Belkacem and Zep, he developed also the original concept of the "Concert de dessins" ("concerts of drawings"), who propose creation, on live, on large screen and in music, of an original comic strip... Under its artistic direction, the Festival of Angoulême considerably consolidated its opening to the international scene and the young creation, while producing a great number of events apart from Angoulême, in particular with Paris (exhibitions produced for the Musée de l’Homme, Mondial de l’automobile or Jardin d’acclimatation). Especially, Benoît Mouchart knows to cross arts, through exhibitions, meetings and spectacles where the comics are confronted, without any complex, with other artistic forms: music, cinema, literature, contemporary art, inter alia. Author of an essay about the French novelist Jean-Patrick Manchette, he published in 2008 a monograph devoted to the French singer and poet Brigitte Fontaine. Since 2013, he's directing Comics department for Casterman, Tintin's publisher.

== Bibliography ==
- Qu'est-ce que la bande dessinée aujourd'hui?, ouvrage collectif, Beaux-arts éditions, 2008 ISBN 978-2-84278-579-6
- Le Grand livre des idées reçues, ouvrage collectif, éditions Le cavalier bleu, 2008 ISBN 2-84670-226-8
- Brigitte Fontaine, intérieur/extérieur, éditions Panama-Archimbaud, 2008 ISBN 2-7557-0067-X
- Chaval, humour libre, ouvrage collectif, éditions Le Festin, 2008, ISBN 978-2-915262-66-7
- Manchette, le nouveau roman noir, éditions Séguier-Archimbaud, 2006 ISBN 2-84049-495-7
- Portraits de famille, avec Zep, éditions Christian Desbois, 2006 ISBN 2-910150-31-3
- La bande dessinée, coll. Idées reçues, éditions Le cavalier bleu, 2004 ISBN 2-84670-071-0
- Nous Tintin, ouvrage collectif sous la direction de Michel Daubert, éditions Moulinsart, 2004 ISBN 2-87424-050-8
- Primé à Angoulême, ouvrage collectif sous la direction de Thierry Groensteen, éditions de l'an 2, 2003 ISBN 2-84856-003-7
- La bande dessinée part en voyage, ouvrage collectif sous la direction de Jean-Luc Marty, éditions Casterman, 2003 ISBN 2-203-37004-1
- La Damnation d'Edgar P. Jacobs, avec François Rivière, éditions Seuil-Archimbaud, 2003 et coll. Points Seuil Essais, 2006 ISBN 2-02-060530-9 et ISBN 2-02-085505-4
- A l'ombre de la ligne claire, éditions Vertige graphic, 2002 ISBN 2-908981-71-8
- Martin Veyron, faiseur d’histoires, éditions du Musée de la bande dessinée, 2002 ISBN 2-907848-32-1
- Michel Greg, dialogues sans bulles, éditions Dargaud, 1999 ISBN 2-205-04786-8

== Exhibitions ==
- « Dupuy-Berberian: 2 » (en collaboration avec Dupuy-Berberian et Mélanie Claude, présentée à Angoulême en 2009).
- « Comics World Expo, volet 2 »: « Villes du futur » (en collaboration avec Céline Bagot et Philippe Richard, présentée à Angoulême en 2008).
- « Comics World Expo, volet 1 » : « Seul dans la foule » (en collaboration avec Nicolas Finet, présentée à Angoulême en 2007).
- « Naissance d'une bande dessinée » (produite à l'occasion de la Fête de la BD en 2006)
- « Jules Verne, images d’un imaginaire » (présentée à Nantes, Shanghai, Séoul et Angoulême en 2006).
- « La nouvelle bande dessinée finlandaise » (présentée à Angoulême à Roubaix et Poitiers en 2006 et en 2007).
- « Le Monde de Zep » (présentée au CNBDI d'Angoulême, puis au Jardin d'acclimatation en 2005)
- « Blake et Mortimer » (présentée au Musée de l'Homme à Paris, La Chaux de Fonds, Angoulême, Poitiers, Ajaccio en 2004, 2005 et 2006)
- « La science-fiction dans la bande dessinée » (présentée au Futuroscope de Poitiers depuis 2004 et jusqu'en 2007)
- « L'automobile dans la bande dessinée » (présentée au Mondial de l'automobile de Paris en 2004)
- « Dave Cooper, anamorphoses » (présentée à Angoulême puis au Centre culturel canadien de Paris en 2005)
- « ABCDEF... Greg ! » (présentée à Angoulême en 1999)
- « Johan De Moor » (présentée à Rambouillet en 1997)
- « Tintin, mythe du XX^{e} » (présentée à Rambouillet en 1995)

== Shows ==
- « Concert de dessins : La Nourriture du paradis », d'après un conte soufi raconté par Brigitte Fontaine, Scénario de Dupuy-Berberian, avec Alfred, Hervé Tanquerelle, Ludovic Debeurme, Clément Oubrerie, Ville Ranta, Hervé Bourhis, Bastien Vivès, Dupuy, Berberian, Tanxxx et Jean-Louis Tripp, musique d'Areski Belkacem, avec Brigitte Fontaine, Bobby Jocky, Dondieu Divin et Frédéric Deville (Angoulême, 2009).
- « Concert de Rodolphe Burger illustré par Dupuy et Berberian » (Angoulême, 2009)
- « Concert de Arno illustré par Johan De Moor et Nix » (Angoulême, 2009)
- « Concert de Arthur H illustré par Christophe Blain » (Angoulême, 2009)
- « Arthur H solo illustré par Christophe Blain » au Café de la Danse (Paris, 2009)
- « Concert de Thomas Fersen illustré par Joann Sfar » (Angoulême, 2008).
- « Le Petit Prince » (d'après Antoine de Saint-Exupéry), avec Joann Sfar, François Morel, Frédéric Deville & Yom au Théâtre de L'Européen (Paris, 2008)
- « Conf' chantée : Brigitte Fontaine », avec Barbara Carlotti, Jean-Pierre Petit, Benjamin Esdraffo et Benoît Mouchart, une production Le Hall de la Chanson, Scène de la Motte rouge aux Francofolies (La Rochelle, 2008)
- « Concert de dessins : Tango », d'après un scénario de Lewis Trondheim, avec Lewis Trondheim, Alfred, Zep, Clément Oubrerie, Ville Ranta, Bastien Vivès, Dupuy, Berberian, José Muñoz et Jean-Louis Tripp, musique d'Areski Belkacem, avec Haydée Alba, Bobby Jocky, Dondieu Divin et Fernando Fiszbein (Angoulême, 2008).
- « Concert de Thomas Fersen illustré par Joann Sfar » (Angoulême, 2008).
- « Sale Affaire, du sexe et du crime » de et avec Yolande Moreau, spectacle illustré par Pascal Rabaté (Angoulême, 2008).
- « Impro-BD », co-produit avec Fluide Glacial, mis en scène par Thierry Tinlot, avec Bercovici, Berberian, Mo/CDM, Jean-Christophe Chauzy (Angoulême, 2008).
- « Concert de dessins : Duel », d'après un scénario de Lewis Trondheim, avec Lewis Trondheim, François Schuiten, Zep, Fred Bernard, Ville Ranta, Ludovic Debeurme, Dupuy, Berberian, O'Groj, Jean-Louis Tripp et Régis Loisel, musique d'Areski Belkacem, avec String machine et Yan Péchin (Angoulême, 2007).
- « Concert de Brigitte Fontaine illustré par Blutch » (Angoulême, 2007).
- « Impro-BD », co-produit avec Fluide Glacial et Mauvais Genres-Rade de Brest, mis en scène par Thierry Tinlot, avec François Boucq, Fournier, Mo/CDM, Jean-Christophe Chauzy (Angoulême et Bruxelles, 2007).
- « Concert de dessins : La souris de Burbanks », d'après un scénario de Zep, avec Zep, Blutch, Hervé Tanquerelle, Grégory Mardon, Ludovic Debeurme, Vincent Sardon, Dupuy, Berberian, Jeff Pourquié, O'Groj, Cosey, Stan et Vince, Edmond Baudoin et Régis Loisel, sur une musique d'Areski Belkacem, avec String machine (Lausanne, 2005 et Angoulême, 2006).
- « Concert de dessins : Little Nemo », d'après un scénario de José-Louis Bocquet et Thierry Smolderen, avec Zep, Nicolas de Crécy, Blutch, Johan De Moor, Dupuy, Berberian, O'Groj, Stan et Vince, Jean-Christophe Chauzy sur une musique d'Areski Belkacem, avec String machine (Angoulême, 2005).
