= List of French films of 2012 =

A list of films produced in France in 2012.

Title	Director	Cast	Genre	Notes
7 Days in Havana	Daniel Brühl, Emir Kusturica, Josh Hutcherson	Benicio del Toro, Pablo Trapero, Julio Médem, Elia Suleiman, Gaspar Noé, Juan Carlos Tabío, Laurent Cantet	Drama	Spanish–French co-production
Alyah	Elie Wajeman	Pio Marmaï, Cédric Kahn	Drama	
Amour	Michael Haneke	Jean-Louis Trintignant, Emmanuelle Riva, Isabelle Huppert	Drama / Romance	Austrian–French–German co-production
The Angels' Share	Ken Loach	John Henshaw, Gary Maitland, William Ruane	Comedy/Drama	Belgian-French-Italian-British co-production
Approved for Adoption	Laurent Boileau		Animation	Belgian–French co-production
Asterix and Obelix: God Save Britannia	Laurent Tirard	Gérard Depardieu, Fabrice Luchini, Catherine Deneuve	Adventure / Comedy / Drama	
Au galop	Louis-Do de Lencquesaing	Louis-Do de Lencquesaing, Alice de Lencquesaing, Valentina Cervi, Marthe Keller	Comedy	
Aujourd'hui	Alain Gomis	Saul Williams		Senegalese-French co-production
Aya de Yopougon	Marguerite Abouet, Clément Oubrerie		Animation	
Bel Ami	Declan Donnellan, Nick Ormerod	Robert Pattinson, Uma Thurman, Kristin Scott Thomas, Christina Ricci, Colm Meaney, Anthony Higgins	Drama	British–French–Italian co-production
Beyond the Walls (Hors les murs)	David Lambert	Guillaume Gouix, Matila Malliarakis, Mélissa Désormeaux-Poulin, David Salles, Flonja Kodheli	Drama	
Camille redouble	Noémie Lvovsky	Noémie Lvovsky, Jean-Pierre Léaud, Yolande Moreau, Denis Podalydès, Samir Guesmi, Michel Vuillermoz	Comedy	
Captive	Brillante Mendoza	Isabelle Huppert	Action, Drama, Thriller, War	French-Filipino-German-British co-production
Coming Home	Frédéric Videau	Agathe Bonitzer, Reda Kateb	Drama	
Confession of a Child of the Century	Sylvie Verheyde	Charlotte Gainsbourg, Pete Doherty, Lily Cole, August Diehl	Drama	
Cosmopolis	David Cronenberg	Robert Pattinson, Paul Giamatti, Samantha Morton, Sarah Gadon, Mathieu Amalric, Juliette Binoche	Drama	Canadian-French-Italian-Portuguese co-production
Diaz – Don't Clean Up This Blood	Daniele Vicari	Claudio Santamaria, Jennifer Ulrich, Elio Germano	Drama	French-Italian-Romanian co-production
Dracula 3D	Dario Argento	Thomas Kretschmann, Rutger Hauer, Asia Argento, Marta Gastini, Unax Ugalde	Horror	French–Italian–Spanish co-production
Ernest & Celestine	Stéphane Aubier, Vincent Patar, Benjamin Renner	Lambert Wilson	Animation	Belgian-French co-production
Farewell, My Queen	Benoît Jacquot	Diane Kruger, Léa Seydoux, Virginie Ledoyen	Drama/Historical	
Flight of the Storks	Jan Kounen	Harry Treadaway, Rutger Hauer, Perdita Weeks	Action thriller	
Flowers of Evil	David Dusa	Rachid Yousef, Alice Belaïdi	Drama	
Fly Me to the Moon	Pascal Chaumeil	Diane Kruger, Dany Boon	Comedy	
Happiness Never Comes Alone	James Huth	Gad Elmaleh, Sophie Marceau	Romantic comedy	
Holy Motors	Leos Carax	Denis Lavant, Édith Scob, Eva Mendes, Kylie Minogue	Fantasy / Drama	
L'Homme qui rit	Jean-Pierre Améris	Gérard Depardieu, Marc-André Grondin, Christa Théret	Drama	
In the House	François Ozon	Fabrice Luchini, Kristin Scott Thomas, Emmanuelle Seigner, Ernst Umhauer	Comedy drama	French production
It's Not a Cowboy Movie (Ce n'est pas un film de cowboys)	Benjamin Parent	Malivaï Yakou, Finnegan Oldfield, Leïla Choukri, Garance Marillier, Damien Gomes	Short, comedy	
My Way	Florent Emilio Siri	Jérémie Renier, Benoît Magimel	Biography/Drama	French production
Madame Solario	René Féret	Marie Féret, Cyril Descours, Harry Lister Smith, Salomé Stévenin, Andrei Zayats	Drama	released 22 August 2012
On the Other Side of the Freeway	David Charhon	Omar Sy, Laurent Lafitte, Zabou Breitman	Comedy	
On the Road	Walter Salles	Garrett Hedlund, Kristen Stewart, Sam Riley	Drama	French–American–Brazilian co-production
One Night	Lucas Belvaux	Yvan Attal, Sophie Quinton, Nicole Garcia	Drama	Belgium –France co-production
The Other Son	Lorraine Lévy	Emmanuelle Devos, Pascal Elbé	Drama	French production
Our Children	Joachim Lafosse	Niels Arestrup, Tahar Rahim, Émilie Dequenne	Psychological	Belgium –France co-production
Paris Manhattan	Sophie Lellouche	Alice Taglioni, Patrick Bruel	Drama	
The Players	Jean Dujardin, Gilles Lellouche	Lionel Abelanski, Fabrice Agoguet	A series of short films set around the theme of infidelity. (109 mins.)	
Popular	Régis Roinsard	Romain Duris, Déborah François		
Renoir	Gilles Bourdos	Michel Bouquet, Christa Théret	Drama	
Something in the Air	Olivier Assayas	Clément Métayer, Lola Créton	Drama	
Taken 2	Olivier Megaton	Liam Neeson, Maggie Grace, Famke Janssen	Thriller	United States–French co-production
Thérèse Desqueyroux	Claude Miller	Audrey Tautou, Gilles Lellouche	Drama	French production
Three Worlds	Catherine Corsini	Clotilde Hesme, Raphaël Personnaz	Drama	
Upside Down	Juan Diego Solanas	Jim Sturgess, Kirsten Dunst	Science Fiction, romance	Canadian–French co-production
