= Angoulême International Comics Festival Prize for First Comic Book =

The Prix Révélation (Prize of Revelation or Debut Prize) is one of the prizes awarded by the Angoulême International Comics Festival. This prize honors cartoonists who are early in their career.

Some version of the prize has been awarded almost every year since the first festival in 1974. At first it was called the Prize of Best Hope (prix du meilleur espoir), then in 1985 it was reborn as the Prize for Best First Album (prix du meilleur premier album). In 1989, as the whole award ceremony was renamed after Hergé's unfinished book Alph-Art, this prize became the Alph-Art coup de cœur and was awarded to authors with up to three published works. From 2003-2006 the award was again called Best First Album (meilleur premier album), then in 2007 was renamed the "Prix Révélation", which is still its name as of 2018.

== 1970s ==
- 1974: Alfredo Chiappori
- 1975: Annie Goetzinger
- 1976: Jean-Claude Gal
- 1977: Régis Franc
- 1978: Les Bidochon by Christian Binet (AUDIE)
- 1979: Goudard t.1: Dossier Goudard by Jean-Pierre Gibrat & Jackie Berroyer (Éditions du Square)

== 1980s ==
- 1980: Docteur Poche by Marc Wasterlain (Dupuis)
- 1981: La Vie d'Einstein by Daniel Goossens (AUDIE)
- 1985: Quéquette Blues by Baru (Dargaud)
- 1986: Crève-coeur by Jean-Claude Götting (Futuropolis)
- 1987: Jo Engo: La grande fièvre by Denis Frémond (Albin Michel)
- 1988: Le soleil des loups by Arthur Qwak and Gilles Gonnort (Vents d’Ouest)
- 1989: Le Journal d'Henriette by Dupuy and Berberian (AUDIE)

== 1990s ==
- 1990: Séjour en Afrique by Alain Garrigue and Jean-Luc Coudray (Rackham)
- 1991: Julius Corentin Acquefacques: L’origine by Marc-Antoine Mathieu (Delcourt)
- 1992: Trio Grande, t.1: Adios, Palomita by Fabrice Lamy, Olivier Vatine, and Alain Clément (Delcourt)
- 1993: Le Bar du vieux Français by Jean-Philippe Stassen and Denis Lapière (Dupuis)
- 1994: Slaloms part 1 by Lewis Trondheim (L'Association)
- 1995: Horologiom part 1 by Fabrice Lebeault (Delcourt)
- 1996: L’Œil du chat by Fabio Viscogliosi (Éditions du Seuil)
- 1997: Journal part 1 by Fabrice Neaud (Ego comme X)
- 1998: La Fille du professeur by Joann Sfar and Emmanuel Guibert (Dupuis)
- 1999: Quelques jours d’été by Christophe Chabouté (Paquet)

== 2000s ==
- 2000: Le Réducteur de vitesse by Christophe Blain (Dupuis)
  - Bretagne by Pierre Wazem (Les Humanoïdes Associés)
  - Un drôle d'ange gardien part 1 by Denis-Pierre Filippi and Sandrine Revel (Delcourt)
  - Hôtel noir by Antoine Ozanam and Bruno Lachard (Paquet)
  - Miss: Bloody Manhattan by Philippe Thirault, Marc Riou, and Mark Vigouroux (Les Humanoïdes Associés)
- 2001: Persépolis by Marjane Satrapi (L’Association)
  - Chiquito la muerte by J.L. Capron (nickname of Jean-Louis Gauthey) and Hugues Micol (Delcourt)
  - Blacksad: Quelque part parmi les ombres by Juan Díaz Canales and Juanjo Guarnido (Dargaud)
  - Shenzhen by Guy Delisle (L’Association)
  - Vagues à l’âme by Grégory Mardon (Les Humanoïdes Associés)
- 2002: Le val des ânes by Matthieu Blanchin
  - Bouffe et châtiment by Mathias Gnehm and Francis Rivolta
  - Hariti: Un ventre aride by Nicolas Ryser and Igor Szalewa
  - Norbert l'Imaginaire : Imaginaire: 1 / Raison: 0 by Olivier Guéret and Nicolas Vadot
  - La région: L'héritage des trente velus by Jérôme Jouvray and Denis Roland
  - Samedi et Dimanche: Le paradis des cailloux by Gwen and Fabien Vehlmann
- 2003: L'âge de raison by Matthieu Bonhomme
  - Banquise by Christophe Gaultier and Sylvain Ricard
  - Chhht ! by Jason
  - Phenomenum: Opus 0 by Jérémie Kaminka and Marc Védrines
  - Sainte famille by Xavier Mussat
  - Supermurgeman: Joue et gagne! by Mathsap
- 2004: Betty Blues by Renaud Dillies and Anne-Claire Jouvray
  - Hector Umbra: Folie semi-automatique by Uli Oesterle
  - Kuklos by Sylvain Ricard and Christophe Gaultier
  - Ludologie by Ludovic Debeurme
  - Palaces by Simon Hureau
  - Soupe froide by Charles Masson
  - La tendresse des crocodiles by Fred Bernard
- 2005: De Mal En Pis by Alex Robinson (Rackham)
  - Blankets - Manteau de neige by Craig Thompson (Casterman)
  - L’immeuble d’en face by Vanyda (La Boîte à Bulles)
  - Extrême-orient: Li Fuzhi by Franck Bourgeron (Vents d’Ouest)
  - Love My Life by Ebine Yamaji (Asuka)
  - Same difference by Derek Kirk Kim (6 Pieds sous Terre)
  - Trois Éclats blancs by Bruno Le Floc'h (Delcourt)
- 2006: Aya de Yopougon part 1 by Clément Oubrerie and Marguerite Abouet (Gallimard)
  - À la lettre près by Cyrille Pomès (Albin Michel)
  - Le blog de Frantico by Frantico (Albin Michel)
  - Cornigule by Takashi Kurihara (Cornélius)
  - Les extravagantes enquêtes d’Otto et Watson: Essence by Krzysztof Gawronkiewicz and Janusz Christa (Glénat)
  - Kinki et Cosy part 1 by Nix (Le Lombard)
  - The Goon: Rien que de la misère by Eric Powell (Delcourt)
- 2007: Panier de singe by Florent Ruppert & Jérôme Mulot (Ruppert et Mulot) (L'Association)
- 2008: L'Éléphant by Isabelle Pralong (Vertige Graphic)
- 2009: Le Goût du chlore (A Taste of Chlorine) by Bastien Vivès (Casterman)

== 2010s ==
- 2010: Rosalie Blum, t.3: Au hasard Balthazar! Camille Jourdy (Actes Sud BD)
- 2011 (tie): La Parenthèse by Élodie Durand (Delcourt)
- 2011 (tie): Trop n'est pas assez by Ulli Lust (Çà et là)
- 2012: TMLP. Ta mère la pute by Gilles Rochier (6 pieds sous terre)
- 2013: Automne by Jon McNaught (Nobrow)
- 2014 (tie): Le Livre de Léviathan by Peter Blegvad (L'Apocalypse)
- 2014 (tie): Mon ami Dahmer by Derf Backderf (Ça et là)
- 2015: Yékini, le roi des arènes by Lisa Lugrin & Clément Xavier (FLBLB)
- 2016: Une étoile tranquille : Portrait sentimental de Primo Levi by Pietro Scarnera (Rackham)
- 2017: Mauvaises filles by Ancco (Cornélius)
- 2018: Beverly by Nick Drnaso (Presque lune)
- 2019: Ted drôle de coco by Émilie Gleason

== 2020s ==
- 2020: Lucarne by Joe Kessler (L'Association)
- 2021: Tanz! by Maurane Mazars, Le Lombard
- 2022: La vie souterraine by Camille Lavaud Benito (Les Requins Marteaux)
