= Delitoon =

French webtoon service

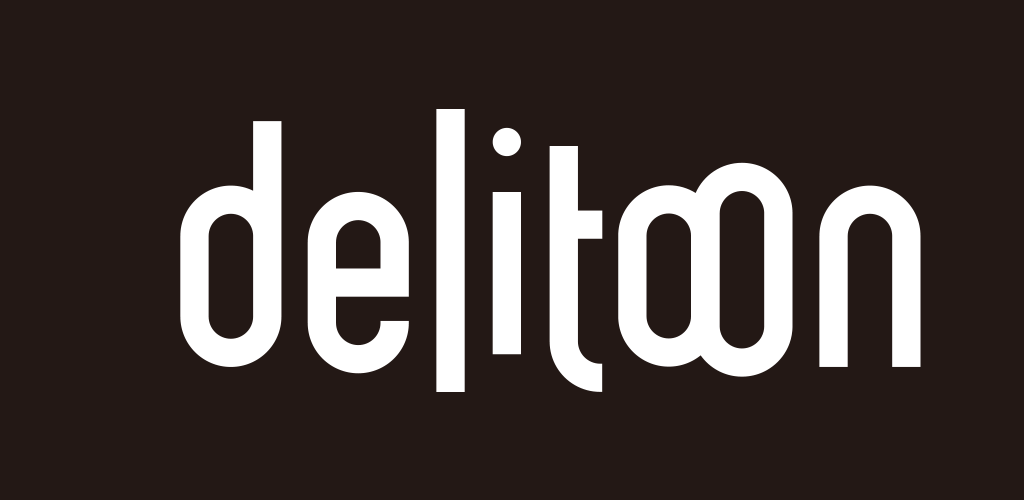
- Owner: Didier Borg
- Website: www.delitoon.com
- Launched: 2011; 15 years ago

Delitoon is a French webtoon service established by Didier Borg in 2011. Initially solely a Casterman product, Delitoon has since been partly acquired by Daou Technology Inc. and has partnered with Sina Weibo. Delitoon offers a large variety of both Korean and French webtoons and makes use of a micropayment system.

== History ==
=== Launch ===
Didier Borg worked in television and music, before becoming an editor for comics publisher Casterman in 2006. Though the television and music industry were revolutionized by digital advancements, Borg found that the comics industry was lagging behind. As the iPhone came out, many start-up companies attempted to distribute comics on mobile devices, but none of these endeavors had any significant success. Didier discerned that such start-up companies lacked knowledge of comic book development, while the larger publishing houses were unable to master the technology. When he worked on the KSTR collection in 2008, Casterman was publishing "curious Korean books without a box": webtoons.

None of the major webtoon services in Korea were willing to collaborate with Casterman to create a French webtoon service, though a smaller company eventually offered to adapt their technology. The first version of Delitoon was launched by Casterman in 2011, offering various French titles from the KSTR collection. Though the website attracted a good number of readers, online advertisement was not able to generate enough revenue. Established French cartoonists were similarly reluctant to publish their work specifically for smartphones.

=== Daou Technology and Sina Weibo partnerships ===
30% of Delitoon was acquired by Daou Technology Inc. in October 2015, for €700,000. The service provided its assortment of webtoons free of charge until January 2016 (during the Angoulême International Comics Festival), when the website experienced a significant redesign. A dozen Korean-translated short stories were published during this event, each available for €10, while single episodes cost less than 80 cents. Borg later stated that Delitoon became a real business in 2015.

Chinese social network Sina Weibo partnered with Delitoon in February 2017, allowing many French webcomics to be translated into Mandarin and many Chinese webcomics to be translated into French.

== Content ==
As of 2017, Delitoon hosts approximately 50 Korean webtoons, translated into French. Borg described Dogko and Honey Blood as two of the service's "hit series". The first two or three episodes of any Delitoon webcomic is free of charge, while further episodes can be purchased through micropayments. The economic system used on the website is based on those used in Asia. On average, a webtoon on Delitoon costs 30% of the price of a classic manga novel. Over 20 new webtoons were launched on Delitoon throughout 2018. Delitoon offers a diverse number of genres and themes.

The French comic Lastman by Bastien Vivès, Michaël Sanlaville and Balak premiered on Delitoon. In adapting Lastman to Delitoon, each panel was split up to follow the traditional web manhwa style on the internet, where instead of clicking to advance to the next page, the reader scrolls down to keep reading. None of Lastman's spin-off titles have yet to appear on Delitoon.

The French webcomic Philocomix by Rue de Sèvres was launched on Delitoon in 2018. As of May 2020, the site hosts its series exclusively in French.

== Readership ==
Described as the "Netflix of comics" by Capital avec Management, the service featured over 35,000 regular buyers in 2018. Delitoon's audience primarily consists of young women, fans of pop culture who are interested in scenarios combining fantasy and romance. In November 2017, over 150,000 people had registered on the website and over 25,000 people had downloaded the Delitoon app.
