= Bresch =

Bresch is a surname. Notable people with the surname include:

- Carsten Bresch (1921–2020), German physicist and geneticist
- Heather Manchin (born 1969), American business executive
- Manon Bresch (born 1998), French-Cameroonian actress
