= Anastasia Shevtsova =

Russian ballerina and actor (born 1995)

- Born: July 2, 1995 (age 31); Saint Petersburg
- Education: Vaganova Ballet Academy
- Occupations: Professional ballerina dancer and actor, choreography
- Employer: Mariinsky Theater
- Known for: Polina
- Style: Contemporary dance

Anastasia Shevtsova (July 2, 1995) is a Russian professional ballerina dancer and actor. She has graduated from Vaganova Ballet Academy. As an actress she is known for her role in Polina, a French drama film directed by Valérie Müller and Angelin Preljocaj, based on the graphic novel Polina by Bastien Vivès. She also played in With the Wind a 2018 drama, and Birds of Paradise in 2021.

== Biography ==
Anastasia Shevtsova was born on July 2, 1995 in Saint Petersburg. She was a student of the Vaganova Ballet Academy in Saint Petersburg, when she was selected at the age of 19 to play the title role of Polina in the film Polina. This was her first role as an actress for this role, she learned French. She was nominated for the César Award for Most Promising Actress in 2017 for Polina. She trained with Mariinsky Ballet and performs her dancing career at Mariinsky Theater in Saint Petersburg, Her training was for contemporary dance to become a choreographer in this genre.
