= Wingwomen =

- Release poster
- Directed by: Mélanie Laurent
- Screenplay by: Mélanie Laurent; Christophe Deslandes; Cédric Anger
- Based on: La Grande Odalisque by: Jérôme Mulot; Florent Ruppert; Bastien Vivès
- Produced by: Sidonie Dumas
- Starring: Adèle Exarchopoulos; Mélanie Laurent; Manon Bresch; Isabelle Adjani
- Cinematography: Antoine Roch
- Edited by: Audrey Simonaud
- Music by: Archive
- Production companies: Gaumont; Netflix
- Distributed by: Netflix
- Release date: 1 November 2023
- Running time: 115 minutes
- Country: France
- Language: French

Wingwomen (French: Voleuses) is a 2023 French action comedy film directed by Mélanie Laurent, who also starred in the movie alongside Adèle Exarchopoulos and Manon Bresch. The film was based on the graphic novel La Grande Odalisque by Jérôme Mulot, Florent Ruppert, and Bastien Vivès. It was released by Netflix on 1 November 2023.

== Plot ==
Carole (Mélanie Laurent) and Alex (Adèle Exarchopoulos) are thieves who work pulling heists for an ambiguous figure called The Godmother (Isabelle Adjani). After Carole learns she is pregnant she decides to quit the business. Carole and Alex escape to a secret retreat but they are attacked by mercenaries sent by The Godmother. When Carole goes to confront The Godmother, The Godmother threatens to murder an innocent bystander unless Carole names her price and comes back.

Carole and Alex decide to pull one last heist and bring in Sam, a recently widowed race car driver to be their getaway driver. Initially angry that Sam has been hired, Alex gradually warms to her. Sam learns that Carole met Alex when she was an angry 14 year old and has been working closely with her ever since.

The trio pull off the heist but when meeting The Godmother Carole has Alex assassinate her. Rather than flee before the police arrive Carole tells Alex that unless she surrenders they will never truly be free. Carole tells Alex to live her own life and then is shot by the police. Sam helps a distraught Alex flee.

Four years later Sam approaches Alex who has given up a life of crime. She approaches her for what Alex believes is one last mission only to find that Carole is alive and is living in secret with her daughter, Raoule, the name Alex proposed Carole name her.

== Cast ==
- Adèle Exarchopoulos as Alex
- Mélanie Laurent as Carole
- Manon Bresch as Sam
- Isabelle Adjani as Marraine
- Félix Moati as Clarence
- Philippe Katerine as Abner
- Mila Rosenthal as Raoule

== Reception ==
On the review aggregator website Rotten Tomatoes, 79% of 14 critics' reviews are positive, with an average rating of 6.2/10. Metacritic, which uses a weighted average, assigned the film a score of 54 out of 100, based on 4 critics, indicating "mixed or average" reviews. On AlloCiné, the film received an average rating of 2.9 out of 5 stars, based on 11 reviews from French critics.

== See also ==
- List of French films of 2023
