= Infinite Comics =

Marvel Comics imprint

Infinite Comics was an imprint of comic books published by Marvel Comics and hosted via the online service Marvel Unlimited, featuring original, made-for-digital stories about the company's superhero characters, including Spider-Man, Wolverine, the Guardians of the Galaxy, the Silver Surfer, the X-Men and the Avengers. Infinite Comics, which ran from 2012 to 2019, were designed for horizontal, on-screen reading.

== History ==
The imprint was launched on the online service Marvel Unlimited in 2012 with the publication of Avengers vs. X-Men #1: Infinite featuring Nova. Infinite Comics were designed for horizontal, on-screen reading. Rather than telling a story over a series of static pages that are divided into panels, Infinite Comics presented screens of content that "take advantage of the digital format with techniques that would not be possible in a print comic, like dynamic panel transitions and captions or dialogue boxes that appear sequentially on an image at the prompting of the reader." The user retains control over the pace of the reading experience, advancing the story with each swipe – sometimes staggering elements into the existing screen (for example, a new word balloon) and at other times revealing an entirely new screen.

This narrative technique was inspired by the work of a French comic book artist, Yves Bigerel (alias "Balak"), who was recruited by Marvel as artistic consultant, story boarder and artist.

== Publication history ==
- Avengers vs. X-Men #1: Infinite (February 2012)
- Avengers vs. X-Men #6: Infinite (June 2012)
- Avengers vs. X-Men #10: Infinite (August 2012)
- Ultimate Spider-Man: Final Exam (October 2012)
- Guardians of the Galaxy: Rocket Raccoon (March 2013)
- Guardians of the Galaxy: Drax (March 2013)
- Guardians of the Galaxy: Gamora (April 2013)
- Guardians of the Galaxy: Groot (May 2013)
- Wolverine: Japan's Most Wanted #1 – 13 (July – 2013)
- Infinity: Against The Tide #1 – 2 (August – September 2013)
- Iron Man: Fatal Frontier #1 – 13 (October 2013 – January 2014)
- Deadpool: The Gauntlet #1 – 13 (January – April 2014)
- Daredevil: Road Warrior #1 – 4 (February – March 2014)
- Ms. Marvel #1 (March 2014)
- Silver Surfer #Point One (March 2014)
- Captain America – The Winter Soldier #1 (March 2014)
- Amazing Spider-Man Cinematic Infinite #1 (April 2014)
- Amazing Spider-Man: Who Am I? #1 – 12 (April 2014 – November 2014)
- Original Sin: Secret Avengers #1 – 2 (May – June 2014)
- Thanos: A God Up There Listening #1 – 6 (July 2014)
- All-New Captain America: Fear Him #1 – 6 (October – November 2014)
- X-Men '92 #1 – 8 (May – September 2015)
- Deadpool & Cable: Split Second #1 – 6 (October 2015 – January 2016)
- Marvel Universe: Ultimate Spider-Man Infinite #1 – #24, volume 2 #1 - #10 (June 2015 – 2016)
- Marvel Universe: Avengers Assemble Infinite #1 – #10 (January 2016 – May 2016)
- The Amazing Spider-Man & Silk: The Spider(Fly) Effect #1 – 8 (January 2016 – May 2016)
- Daredevil/Punisher: Seventh Circle #1–8 (March 2016 – June 2016)
- Doctor Strange/Punisher: Magic Bullets #1–8 (November 2016 – February 2017)

== See also ==
- Infinite canvas
