= Polina (film) =

- Theatrical release poster
- Polina, danser sa vie
- Directed by: Valérie Müller; Angelin Preljocaj
- Screenplay by: Valérie Müller
- Based on: Polina by Bastien Vivès
- Produced by: Didier Creste; Gaëlle Bayssière
- Starring: Anastasia Shevtsova; Niels Schneider; Juliette Binoche; Jérémie Bélingard; Aleksei Guskov
- Cinematography: Georges Lechaptois
- Edited by: Fabrice Rouaud; Guillaume Saignol
- Music by: 79D
- Production companies: Everybody On Deck; TF1 Droits Audiovisuels; UGC Images; France 2 Cinéma
- Distributed by: UGC Distribution
- Release dates: 3 September 2016 (Venice); 16 November 2016 (France)
- Running time: 108 minutes
- Country: France
- Languages: French; Russian
- Budget: $4 million
- Box office: $1 million

Polina (French: Polina, danser sa vie) is a 2016 French drama film directed by Valérie Müller and Angelin Preljocaj, based on the graphic novel Polina by Bastien Vivès. The film was screened as part of the Venice Days programme at the 73rd Venice International Film Festival.

== Plot ==
As a child Polina auditions for ballet school and is accepted. She catches the eye of the head teacher and choreographer, Bojinski, who is particularly hard on her because he senses her talent. However she continuously struggles with the rigidity of training for ballet and her own passion for dance.

Polina is accepted into the Bolshoi Ballet in Moscow which for years had been the dream of her teachers and family. However, after witnessing a different type of dance at a festival, Polina decides to go to Aix-en-Provence and audition for a modern dance school there alongside her boyfriend, Adrien. They are both accepted though she is warned that modern dance is very different from the classical training she is used to. Polina struggles with the choreography and is criticized for focusing on her work to the exclusion of everything else. During a rehearsal she injures her ankle and is quickly replaced by her understudy, Sonia, who begins an affair with Adrien. When Polina heals she asks for her role in the show back, but the choreographer, Liria, tells her she is not emotionally ready. Frustrated, Polina leaves the company.

Polina ends up in Antwerp where she calls the number of the first dance company she sees. There she auditions for a strange man who tells her that since she is a dancer and they both know she can dance he wants her to make him feel something. The audition is unsuccessful and Polina leaves, but before she does she sees a man teaching dance to kids. Polina is unable to find work elsewhere. Starving and homeless she eventually is able to scrape up a waitressing job at a bar. She returns to the site of her unsuccessful audition and meets Karl, the dancer who teaches improv. She attends one of his classes and begins to enjoy dancing once more. Encouraged by Karl, Polina choreographs a duet for the two of them to dance.

Polina's father dies and she goes to Moscow where her mother tells her that her father always wanted her to be a great dancer. Polina returns to Antwerp where she and Karl perform their piece for a programmer who books them into the Montpellier Festival.

== Cast ==
- Anastasia Shevtsova as Polina
- Veronika Zhovnytska as young Polina
- Juliette Binoche as Liria Elsaj
- Aleksei Guskov as Bojinski
- Jérémie Bélingard as Karl
- Niels Schneider as Adrien
- Sergio Díaz as Sergio
- Miglen Mirtchev as Anton
- Ambroise Divaret as Alex
- Kseniya Kutepova as Natalia
- Oriana Jimenez as Svetlana

== See also ==
- List of French films of 2016
