= Mortel =

2019 French supernatural television series

- Genre: Fantasy television; Superhero; Supernatural fiction; Coming of Age; Teen drama
- Created by: Frédéric Garcia
- Directed by: Edouard Salier; Simon Astier
- Starring: Carl Malapa; Nemo Schiffman; Manon Bresch; Corentin Fila
- Composer: Nico Bogue
- Country of origin: France
- Original language: French
- No. of seasons: 2
- No. of episodes: 12

Production
- Executive producer: Stéphanie Carron
- Producers: Gilles de Verdière; Régis Vallon
- Running time: 50 minutes
- Production company: Mandarin Television

Original release
- Network: Netflix
- Release: 21 November 2019 – 2 July 2021

Mortel (French for 'Mortal') is a French supernatural television series. The plot revolves around three teenagers, two of whom have acquired superpowers after making a deal with a supernatural being in order to solve a murder. The show premiered on Netflix on 21 November 2019. The second season premiered on 2 July 2021.

== Synopsis ==
Two teenagers, Sofiane and Victor, make a pact with a voodoo god Obé to allow them solve and avenge the apparent murder of Sofiane's brother, Reda. Sofiane is given the power by Obé to manipulate other people's actions, while Victor can read their minds. Both however must be present near each other for their powers to work. They then enlist the help of Luisa, who practices voodoo with her grandmother, so they may be free of the grip that Obé has on them and banish Obé from the world.

== Cast and characters ==
- Carl Malapa as Sofiane Kada
- Némo Schiffman as Victor Wanderwelt
- Manon Bresch as Luisa Manjimbe
- Corentin Fila as Obé
- Sami Outalbali as Reda Kada, brother of Sofiane
- Firmine Richard as Elizabeth, Luisa's grandmother
- Anaïs Thomas as Audrey Jourdant
- Raphaëlle Agogué as Celine Wanderwelt
- Marvin Dubart as Bastien Duponchel
- Léa Léviant as Melanie
- Assa Sylla as Nora Cissoko
- Stéphane Brel as Herve
- Daouda Keita as Ousmane Blanchard

== Episodes ==
Series	Episodes	Originally released
1	6	21 November 2019
2	6	2 July 2021

=== Season 1 (2019) ===
No. overall	No. in season	Title	Directed by	Written by	Original release date
1	1	"Super Bad"	Edouard Salier	Frédéric Garcia, Yann Le Gal, Lola Roqueplo & Fanny Talmone	21 November 2019
2	2	"Hot. Hot. Hot."	Edouard Salier	Frédéric Garcia, Yann Le Gal, Lola Roqueplo & Fanny Talmone	21 November 2019
3	3	"Nothing Nudes Under the Moon"	Edouard Salier	Frédéric Garcia, Yann Le Gal, Lola Roqueplo & Fanny Talmone	21 November 2019
4	4	"Don't You Know That You're Toxic"	Simon Astier	Frédéric Garcia, Yann Le Gal, Lola Roqueplo & Fanny Talmone	21 November 2019
5	5	"La Solitudine"	Simon Astier	Frédéric Garcia, Yann Le Gal, Lola Roqueplo & Fanny Talmone	21 November 2019
6	6	"The Puppets' Tears"	Simon Astier	Frédéric Garcia, Yann Le Gal, Lola Roqueplo & Fanny Talmone	21 November 2019

=== Season 2 (2021) ===
No. overall	No. in season	Title	Directed by	Written by	Original release date
7	1	"Super Good"	Maxime Cointe	Frédéric Garcia, Marine Josset, Lola Roqueplo	2 July 2021
8	2	"Entwined With You"	Maxime Cointe	Frédéric Garcia, Jules Lugan, Fanny Talmone	2 July 2021
9	3	"Impossible To Leave"	Laurent Barès	Frédéric Garcia, Lola Roqueplo	2 July 2021
10	4	"The Marriage of Obé"	Laurent Barès	Frédéric Garcia, Fanny Talmone	2 July 2021
11	5	"Qumran"	Maxime Cointe	Frédéric Garcia	2 July 2021
12	6	"Aprézan nou lyanné"	Laurent Barès	Frédéric Garcia, Fanny Talmone	2 July 2021

== Reception ==
The show received a mixed reception from the critics. GQ magazine, despite some reservation about its special effect, praised the skill of the story-telling, the acting of the principal actors, as well as the soundtracks. It considered the show to be the best French series since the launch of Netflix and deserving of a second season. Télérama was highly critical, considering the series more laughable than a hit, and its music failed to hide its stylistic flaws. Premiere thought the series veered awkwardly between teen drama and its supernatural elements but was nevertheless successful stylistically. Based only on its first episode, the Decider found the series to be too muddled to continue watching a second episode.
