= Petit Paul =

2018 graphic novel by Bastien Vivès

- Cover of Petit Paul single-volume edition.

Publication information
- Publisher: Glénat
- Format: Graphic novel
- Genre: Erotic fantasy
- Publication date: 19 September 2018
- Main character(s): Petit Paul

Creative team
- Created by: Bastien Vivès
- Written by: Bastien Vivès
- Artist(s): Bastien Vivès

Collected editions
- Petit Paul: ISBN 978-2-344-02897-1

Petit Paul (lit. 'Little Paul') is a 2018 graphic novel written and illustrated by Bastien Vivès. It was published on 19 September 2018 by Glénat as part of Porn'Pop collection. But it was withdrawn from sale following allegations of child pornography.

== Synopsis ==
The comic strip tells the adventures of a precocious ten-year-old Paul endowed with a penis of astonishing size, who finds himself confronted with the lust of the women around him with whom he ends up having exclusively sexual adventures.

== Controversy ==
Almost immediately after its release, the book became the subject of considerable controversy and the situations presented in it were accused of child pornography.

In 2022, Bastien Vivès' programming as guest of honor at the Angoulême festival, with a planned exhibition, sparked a new controversy. On this occasion, Bastien Vivès' past statements resurface as well as certain aspects of his editorial production, including Petit Paul. Two associations file complaints against him and his publishers. Cartoonist Joanna Lorho told on Libération on 22 December 2022, "It is dishonest to say that Petit Paul by Bastien Vivès has nothing to do with pedocriminality." She believes that Vivès is representative of a comic strip environment that is too exclusively masculine and sexist.

On 6 January 2023, the Nanterre public prosecutor's office opened a preliminary investigation targeting Bastien Vivès and the publishing houses Glénat and Les Requins Marteau.
