= Aya of Yop City =

Series of graphic novels

Aya: Life in Yop City comprises the first 3 volumes.

Aya of Yop City is a series of graphic novels written by Marguerite Abouet and drawn by Clément Oubrerie. The original albums were published in France by Gallimard from 2005. The volumes have also been translated into English and published by Drawn & Quarterly. The series was also translated into 15 languages.

Although not autobiographical, the story is inspired on the author's life in the Ivory Coast. The authors adapted the first two books into an animated film of the same title, which was released in 2013.

== Background ==
Marguerite Abouet was working as a legal assistant in Paris when she conceived the idea of Aya of Yop City, inspired to create the series by her friends who encouraged her to write stories from her childhood in her native Ivory Coast. She ended up writing up a group of Ivorian teenagers' everyday lives. Later, Clément Oubrerie, animator, artist and children's book illustrator, gained interest in the project, and it eventually became the first graphic novel for both artists.

Inspired by Iranian graphic novelist Marjane Satrapi, Abouet has created a story that depicts the normality of life in the Ivory Coast. Although Abouet has denied that the stories are based on her own life, she admits it is strongly based on people in her childhood in Côte d'Ivoire. The quotidian nature of the stories in Aya of Yop City counters heavily with common conceptions and representation of African life, such as famine, civil war and unhinged wilderness. Abouet's depiction of everyday African life through humor gave western viewers a very different viewpoint of Africa that they are not accustomed to seeing. Through this depiction, Aya of Yop City subverts negative stereotypes that plague Côte d'Ivoire and Africa in general.

== Plot summary ==
Aya of Yop City is a novel that follows the lives of many different people living in the Côte d'Ivoire. All of the characters are connected by the main character, Aya, as she assists and helps them through their various dilemmas and daily issues. The book begins with the birth of the son of Moussa and Adjoua. The wedding between Moussa and Adjoua is canceled when they discover the child is not Moussa's. He begins to work for his father. His father seems to be very hard on him, but at the same time Moussa is extremely lazy and does not really do much. At work he tends to hit on the women workers, and is always being yelled at by his father. All the while Adjoua is selling fritters at the market trying to provide for her son. Aya takes care of Adjoua's son the majority of the time and is always helping Adjoua while trying to keep up with her schoolwork at the same time. While this is occurring, Aya's friend Bintou begins seeing a Parisian man named Gregoire.

Another character in the story, Herve, goes to Aya for help. He works fixing cars and is going to end up taking over the business since the owner is sick. However, he does not know how to read and write. It is because of this that he goes to Aya and asks her if she is able to teach him about letters. Aya agrees, as she is always helping out her friends and family. Nevertheless, Aya also has some problems of her own - a secret her father Ignace has been hiding for a long time has the power to destroy her family.

== Volume list ==
No.	Original French release date	Individual English releases	Omnibus English releases
1	20 November 2005	"Aya"; ISBN 9781894937900	"Aya: Life in Yop City"; ISBN 9781770460829
2	29 September 2006	"Aya of Yop City"; ISBN 9781897299418	"Aya: Life in Yop City"; ISBN 9781770460829
3	9 October 2007	"Aya: The Secrets Come Out"; ISBN 9781897299791	"Aya: Life in Yop City"; ISBN 9781770460829
4	21 November 2008	—N/a	"Aya: Love in Yop City"; ISBN 9781770460928
5	5 November 2009	—N/a	"Aya: Love in Yop City"; ISBN 9781770460928
6	25 November 2010	—N/a	"Aya: Love in Yop City"; ISBN 9781770460928
7	14 September 2022	"Aya: Claws Come Out"; ISBN 9781770467019	—N/a
8	15 November 2023	"Aya: Face the Music"; ISBN 9781770467521	—N/a

The French series is called Aya de Yopougon. The volumes do not have individual titles, only volume numbers (Tome 1, Tome 2, etc.).

== Cultural history ==
Aya of Yop City is set in Côte d'Ivoire during the 1970s and 1980s. Specifically, the story takes place in Yopougon-Koute, or Yop City for short. Côte d'Ivoire, a country on the west coast of Africa, was colonized by France until August 7, 1960, when the country received its independence. Félix Houphouët-Boigny led the country after gaining independence until 1993. During this time, Côte d'Ivoire kept close ties with its West African neighbors as well as ties to France. This combination of influences created a unique culture where traditional African culture meshed with modern Western ideals. The post-colonial influence was enhanced by the fact that many Europeans, especially the French, moved to the country after they received independence.

When Houphouët-Boigny took the presidency, the country experienced an economic boom, known as the "Ivorian miracle". This boom led to the creation of the middle class. With this rise in wealth for a portion of the country, many were able to send their children to school, especially peasants. A peak in the primary-school enrollment rates, at 9.1% between 1976 and 1980, reflects this change. Education, along with other social influences, made many, mostly women, aware of their rights. This began to mix African ideals with European ideals. Women began fighting back against legislation which was aimed at sexual inequality and often succeeded in doing so. As many women became educated, they received more and more power when it came to relationships, especially marriages. Another example of the combination of cultures is language. Throughout the country there are many local languages, but the official language of the country is French. Again, these influences can be seen throughout the novel, especially through the female characters.

== Major themes ==
Advancement of women in society

Aya is different than the other women in Yop City because of her dismissal of the task of finding a husband. She is completely uninterested in men and would rather take care of Bobby and work towards her future. She is a very driven and independent, which is certainly highlighted throughout the novel. On the other hand, the other women in the novel do not seem to be as concerned as Aya with changing their roles in society through pursuing an education and a professional level career. Rather they are more predisposed to the typical women's role in Yop City of staying home to raise a family. Aya nevertheless sets a good example and high standard, as she aspires to be a doctor one day. Aya represents the push towards raising the standards of women's contributions to the community, rather than staying consistent with the historical gender role in Yop City, as displayed by the other women.

Honesty and loyalty

Many of the characters face problems with infidelity and dishonesty in their narratives—whether they are the perpetrators or the victims, their paths eventually cross in more ways than one, often not in good ways (in the sense that they are often manipulated by or manipulating each other). Aya contradicts this best, being the emblem of loyalty and honesty in the novel.

Family and community

Within the first page of Aya of Yop City, the family units are mapped out, laying the groundwork for the strong family ties and connections throughout the novel. These initial family trees let the reader know immediately that family ties are going to be an important force in the community. Within each scene multiple community members from each of the families interact, showing they are ever present in each other's lives. The close connections between the different characters gives the reader the sense that this community has always been tightly knit. Aya best portrays this sense of community through her relationships with others. She performs many favors for her friends, most notably taking care of Bobby as if he was her own. From living in the same area to getting involved in the family business, as Moussa did, the people of Yop City truly value the family unit.

== Analysis ==
Origin of nationalism in Africa

The colonial era in Africa created loosely formed states that contained many different ethnic groups that maintained strong communal values. In the post-colonial era, it became evident that African nations would need to unite in order to form permanent states and establish national governments. This re-branded type of nationalism was created through a collaboration of ideas stemming from traditional communal ties already in existence on the continent, and by the idea of self- determination that was championed by the United Nations. Together, these concepts assisted in the creation of sovereign states in Africa.

African communal identity in the novel

The novel Aya of Yop City encompasses an overall theme of African nationalism, which is exhibited through familial and communal ties within the Ivorian community. Communalism is argued to be a form of nationalism that is unique to Africa because of the continent's history with colonialism. This communal idea of nationalism serves a different purpose than the Eurocentric norm, in that it is focused on obtaining a collective identity that speaks to the shared history of the African people living in a post-colonial era. For example, the characters in the book are not introduced individually, but rather as family members that play complementary roles. This shows how a distinct identity is formed for the dwellers of Yop city, as they navigate their lives in a post-colonial society. The problems that are usually seen as individual or family issues become community-wide issues. For instance, when Adjoua, a teenage girl in the novel, becomes pregnant the community rallies behind her to offer support. Aya watches after Adjoua's child so that she can continue selling items at the market to support her family. This illustrates the strong communal identity that binds the inhabitants of Yop City together.

Artistic style

Clément Oubrerie uses an expressive style that conveys the melodramatic tone of the text. His pencil strokes often go a step beyond reality to express strong emotions and to give his characters a distinct personality. For example, Bonaventure Sissoko is caricatured as a bully archetype: his eyes are completely masked by his bushy eyebrows and his huge bald head is attached directly unto his massive body. This exaggeration technique is used for comic effect and it also gives the readers an immediate impression of Bonaventure's obnoxious personality.

In contrast, Oubrerie's settings are very realistic. He uses a great amount of detail in his backgrounds to depict with accuracy the social and economic environment of post-colonial Ivory Coast in the 70's. Every scene, from the modern Ivorian cityscape to the small-town marketplace, is drawn in minute detail and vibrant colors that give the readers an immersive experience. In addition, Oubrerie's detailed settings help to establish characterization in the story. For example, Bonaventure's pink mansion stands out from all the other houses like a sore thumb in the same way that his body towers over the other characters.

== Character list ==
- Aya - the protagonist of the book, Aya is a sweet and humble girl who is connected to every character in some way. Aya helps out the entire community in several ways. She is supportive of her friends and family and is always willing to help others. Although she is very young, the audience gets a glimpse of different problems and situations that are common in the African culture through her.
- Ignace - Aya's father and a working businessman. He takes Aya with him to work as a visit, and when they reach his work establishment, it becomes very apparent that Ignace keeps his family life and work life very separate. Ignace is very defensive and can be extremely rude when he feels that his family may be suspicious about his actions.
- Akissi - Aya's little sister.
- Fofana - Aya's little brother.
- Felicite - the maid for Aya's family and also helps take care of Bobby. Aya wishes to help Felicite practice for the Miss Yopougon pageant. Felicite, in conjunction with Aya, will help Adjoua with her child situation by either watching Bobby, or helping Adjoua sell fritters at the market.
- Fanta - Aya's mother and a typical African housewife. She does chores around the house and tends to the children. Fanta is very sweet towards her husband and Aya.
- Adjoua – a young single mother struggling to make money in Yop City. Adjoua told her family that the child, Bobby, was Moussa's son, so she could marry Moussa. Throughout the book, Adjoua shows her irresponsibility with her child, as Aya is usually taking care of Bobby while Adjoua works at the market.
- Hyacinte - Adjoua's father. He is very persistent about confirming that Bobby is Moussa's son. Hyacinte was outraged to find out the Mamadou was the actual father, when he was working so hard to prove some type of family connection between Moussa and Bobby. Hyacinte abandons Adjoua after being disappointed that her child was not the heir to Moussa's fortune.
- Korotoumou - Adjoua's mother. She was outraged as well to find out that Moussa was not the father. It served as a disappointment to the entire family and an embarrassment in the community.
- Albert - Adjoua's brother. Albert is not a major character in the first book but he is sneaking around with another woman at night. He won't introduce this girl to his family, he is very defensive when anyone asks about her and his girl is not shown in the book.
- Bintou – very promiscuous woman who is dying to live a fancier life, as well as being a very materialistic, money hungry woman who is only concerned with her own well-being. However, she is very confident and has high self-esteem, but her cockiness inhibits from her to see things as they truly are.
- Koffi - Bintou's father.
- Herve - Bintou's cousin, Herve is extremely hard working. He works as a car mechanic and is becoming increasingly skilled at fixing cars. Herve is also illiterate and comes to Aya after he decided that he wants to learn the alphabet.
- Mamadou - Bobby's biological father. Mamadou is referred to as a skirt chaser because he is known to sleep around the city. At first, Mamadou does not seem like a responsible father figure, but towards the end of the book, the audience sees a growth in Mamadou as he searches for a job and begins to help Adjoua with Bobby by paying child support.
- Moussa – he and his family are much wealthier than the other families in the book. He uses his father's name to meet girls and he often daydreams about women and living a carefree life. His father is very critical of him and he is scolded often.
- Bonaventure Sissoko - Moussa's father. He is very unemotional and is often angry. He is very strict with his son and his business. Bonaventure continuously expresses his hard work ethic and his disapproval of his son's immature ways.
- Simone Sissoko - Moussa's mother, who is much more compassionate and worried about Moussa, she also encourages Bonaventure to be more kind to their son. She is very supportive of her son and understands that Bonaventure can be too aggressive with him sometimes.
- Gregoire - a poor man who tricks Bintou into believing that he is a rich French Parisian. Gregoire is actually sleeping with several woman and he saves up money just so he can appear like a rich man and spoil his mistresses. He is a desperate man who will sell anything just so he can manipulate young women into having sex with him.
- Jeanne - Ignace's secretary and his mistress. Ignace keeps Jeanne a secret while Jeanne seems to know a lot about Aya and her family, and also has two children with him. Aya and her family are completely unaware of Jeanne and her role until the end of the book when she surprises them at their home.

== Reception ==
Aya of Yop City debuted to much critical acclaim, receiving a Quill Award nomination, and praise for its accessibility to audiences and for the rare portrait of a warm, friendly, and rather modern Africa. The first album received the Prize for First Album at the 2006 Angoulême International Comics Festival. The series is one of the few works of African fiction in graphic novel form that has gained exposure globally. The novel was well received throughout Africa. In Abouet's native country of Ivory Coast, more affordable copies of the book were made available which contributed to its popularity.

Aya Claws Come Out won the 2023 Dwayne McDuffie Award for Diversity in Comics.

== Film adaptation ==
The novel was adapted into an animated film that was released in July 2013. The film was co-directed and written by Abouet and Oubrerie and was produced by Autochenille Production, the studio responsible for the film adaptation of Joann Sfar's The Rabbi's Cat.
