= Lastman (comic book) =

French series by Bastien Vivès, Balak, and Michaël Sanlaville

Publication information
- Publisher: Casterman
- Format: Limited series
- Genre: action, adventure
- Publication date: March 2013
- No. of issues: 12

Creative team
- Written by: Bastien Vivès, Balak
- Artist(s): Bastien Vivès, Michaël Sanlaville

Lastman is a French comics series written by Bastien Vivès and Balak and drawn by Bastien Vivès and Michaël Sanlaville. It has been published since March 2013 by Casterman in the collection KSTЯ. Skybound Entertainment began releasing the series in English on November 9, 2022 in the form of 2-in-1 Omnibus Volumes.

In 2016, an adult animation series telling the origin of Richard, debuted on the public French TV channel France 4.

== Synopsis ==
In the "Valley of Kings", a world where magic is acknowledged as reality, an annual grand tournament sponsored by the King and Queen is being prepared. Young Adrian Velba works all year in the combat school of Master Jansen to participate. Sadly, Adrian's partner suddenly falls ill and deserts. Since it is a duo tournament, the young boy is forced to give up his dream... until Richard Aldana, a hunk boxer from the real modern world with bearish manners comes out of nowhere to unexpectedly ally himself with Adrian.

== Characters ==
=== Main characters ===
- Richard Aldana

Brash, headstrong, and hot-tempered man but with a good heart, extremely resourceful, and never yielding attitude with great boxing skills.

The animated series is based 10 years before the comic's start. Where he meets Siri and his boxing mentor Dave McKenzie, fighting demons which are long-dead original royalty from a magical parallel world called "The Valley of Kings". They are betrayed by his boxing mentor's younger brother in containing the final demon and he ends up losing the orphan Siri who was like an adopted daughter to him. Unbeknownst to him he is forever tied to the broken gate the mentor's brother forced open to reach "The Valley of Kings". The second season picks up a decade later and shows how he discovered a way to enter "The Valley of Kings".

In the first comic series, he travels to "The Valley of Kings" as Aldana uses his smarts and skill to assist Adrian and his mother Marianne, in the tournaments. This sets off on an adventure, where the three travel through the neighboring cities of Niliopolis and Paxtown. The three grow close and decide to live happily together in "The Valley of Kings". However, they are betrayed by the captain of the guards, Morgan. Aldana becomes further despondent and aloof from 10 years of imprisonment while blamed for the death of his loved ones and ever-increasing monster incursions in "The Valley of Kings".

Then starts the second series of comics. The kingdom has now reinstated the long defunct royal guard, a massive wall is built to block the entrance of the rift, and Richard Aldana is blamed for the gloom that has overtaken the kingdom. The king desperately wants to end the monster incursions and hires the exiled dark wizard to assist. It turns out the wizard is Howard McKenzie, and the estranged husband of Marianne, who left him because of his selfishness in dark magic, and Dave's younger brother. He manipulates the king and reverses the worlds logic where the living is dead and dead to life to bring back the prince's mother. Aldana is freed to join a resistance in finding the alive prince Adrian but he too is despondent and doesn't want to return. Aldana is blamed for his brashness and the resistance team once again tries to find a way to fix "The Valley of Kings" by confronting the wizard in a dying world. He travels to the other world and fights even when he knows he can't win against the wizard. He therefore, knowing the magic knight can read memories forces her to read his memories to snap her out of the brainwashing. Knight realizes how much Aldana has lost and struggled while continuing to fight to help others breaking the brainwashing control with the inspiration to fight. The knight knows Aldana's memories of Siri, his mentor, his best friend, and the love of his life and that it was the wizard who has caused their loss and the damaged portal introducing the monster incursions. Aldana dies from the wizard's surprise attack and his friends along with the knight and Siri, who turns out to live years of enslavement and assassin training when transported to "The Valley of Kings", work together to defeat the wizard and restore balance. On earth years later, his friends are seen in their yearly celebration of Aldana's influence on their lives though he was rash and hard man to understand he was always caring person hand outreached. Last panel shows Aldana revived by the last dying person in "The Valley of Kings" watching the sun rise.

- Adrian Velba
- Marianne Velba

==== Characters of "the Valley of Kings" ====
- Master Jansen
- Cristo Canyon
- Lord Ignacio Cudna
- King Virgil
- Queen Efira
- Francis Sullivan
- Elorna Morgan
- Gregorio Lempkin
- Madame Sakova

==== "Paxtown" characters ====
- Tomie Katana
- Milo Zotis
- "H"
- Peter Verkaik
- Banus
- Fiona Merry
- Dave McKenzie
- Howard McKenzie
- Siri/Corinne Cass

== Presentation ==
The series was initially pre-published on delitoon.com, a free website for the publication of comic books on the web. In adapting Lastman to Delitoon, each panel was split up to follow the traditional webtoon type of manhwa, where instead of clicking to advance to the next page, the reader scrolls down to keep reading. None of Lastman's spin-off titles have yet to appear on Delitoon. Some visual differences appear between the physical and Delitoon releases of the series, notably the entirety of the eighth volume being entirely in colour on Delitoon, whereas in the physical release, only the first few pages are, with the remainder being in black and white.

Lastman is depicted as a "French-style manga", by Bastien Vivès: "We use the format and some codes of the manga but we're not playing at imitating Japanese culture". Vivès also mentions other influences such as Disney movies and blockbusters from the 80's and 90's (some of them by Steven Spielberg). Most of the characters in Lastman are named after busty pornographic actresses, notably Rachel Aldana, and Tomie Katana having both her name and likeness based on Hitomi Tanaka.

To keep up with the exacting publication rhythm of 20 sheets per week, the authors have well-defined tasks: "Bastien [Vivès] imagines the story in its main arcs, the intentions of the characters, the way the action will evolve, then talks about with the other two: Balak is in charge of the storyboard, cuts the album into episodes, in the way of a TV series season [...] Finally, Michaël [Sanlaville] draws 20 sheets weekly with Bastien, and everyone checks everyone else's sheet". The narration rhythm is based on that of a TV series': "We try to adapt to the rhythm of quickly fast produced and aired TV series, like The Walking Dead or Game of Thrones's adaptations. And as for this, we really have to bow down to Balak, who rapidly creates and storyboards without losing anything of his quality".

The main line of comics concluded with its twelfth volume, released on the 20th of November, 2019. As of May 2020, First Second Books published the first six volumes of the series in English. Skybound Entertainment released the series as 6 compiled volumes from November 2022-2024.

== Volumes ==
=== Main ===
No.	Original release date	Original ISBN	English release date (First Second)	English ISBN (First Second)	English release date (Skybound)	English ISBN (Skybound)
1	March 2013	978-2-203-04773-0	March 31 2015	978-1-62672-046-6	November 9 2022	978-1-5343-2229-5
2	June 12 2013	978-2-203-06880-3	June 23 2015	978-1-62672-047-3	November 9 2022	978-1-5343-2229-5
3	November 6 2013	978-2-203-07404-0	October 6 2015	978-1-62672-048-0	March 15 2023	978-1-5343-2476-3
4	March 19 2014	978-2-203-07848-2	February 16 2016	978-1-62672-049-7	March 15 2023	978-1-5343-2476-3
5	June 25 2014	978-2-203-07849-9	July 19 2016	978-1-62672-050-3	November 8 2023	978-1-5343-2581-4
6	October 29 2014	978-2-203-08359-2	November 1 2016	978-1-62672-051-0	November 8 2023	978-1-5343-2581-4
7	August 26 2015	978-2-203-09094-1			March 6 2024	978-1-5343-5773-0
8	January 20 2016	978-2-203-09095-8			March 6 2024	978-1-5343-5773-0
9	October 26 2016	978-2-203-10285-9			July 17 2024	978-1-5343-2583-8
10	August 23 2017	978-2-203-12620-6			July 17 2024	978-1-5343-2583-8
11	November 7 2018	978-2-203-15798-9			November 20 2024	978-1-5343-5896-6
12	November 20 2019	978-2-203-18611-8			November 20 2024	978-1-5343-5896-6

=== Spin-offs and special issues ===
- Sexy Sirène, March 2014 (ISBN 978-2-203-07850-5) is an in-universe magazine. The character Adrian Velba can be seen holding it in volume 3.
- Lastman Stories - Soir de match, January 2018 (ISBN 978-2-203-12196-6) ("Match night" or "Game night", as in a game of football) is a spin-off published in January 2018, taking place between the events of the first season of the animated series and volume 1.

== Reception ==
The series has received mixed review from both generalist and specialised press. Du9, who considers that the series is a success from a formal point of view, especially thanks to the "charm of Vivès's typical feminine characters, whose beauty is sometimes only shown by a few strokes of the pencil", also thinks that it "would be less likely that the series trigger the massive adhesion of children and pre-teen readers", the authors addressing "rather young adults or, more likely, geeks nostalgic of Japanese series and/or being receptive to "fan service"". Télérama finds "the story efficient and funny, clearly inspired by Dragon Ball of Akira Toriyama". The Huffington Post points out that "Vivès uses the classical codes of martial arts tournament manga only to crush them more efficiently with his bearish and ruthless Aldana".

The series has met with quite a success in Europe with nearly 100 000 volumes sold. 10 000 copies were distributed in USA in March 2015.

== Adaptations and other media ==
=== Adult animation (series) ===
An adult animated prequel to the comic book was produced thanks to a successful crowdfunding campaign in the summer of 2016. The episodes were all aired on France 4, on Tuesday evenings from November 22 to December 14, 2016. The show was made available for streaming on Netflix in France and Belgium in 2018, and also on the Mondo Media VRV channel in the United States.

In June 2019, Vivès and Sanlaville confirmed that the animated series would get a second season. It debuted on October 29, 2022 and is named Lastman Heroes. Season 2 jumps forward a decade, has a more somber tone and is set about one year before the comic begins.

=== Video game ===
A video game, Lastfight, developed by the independent publisher Piranaking, came out on September 20, 2016. It was also released for the Nintendo Switch on November 30, 2019.

=== Spin-off volumes ===
In March 2020, Vivès revealed in an interview with BFMTV that he was working on a second Lastman Stories volume.

== Exhibition ==
- Lastman : universe at the Angoulême International Comics Festival in 2016.

== Distinction ==
=== Nominations ===
- 2014 : Finalist of the Prix BD Fnac ^{[8]}
- 2014 : 41st Angoulême International Comics Festival, official selection (tome 1)

=== Prizes and awards ===
- 2015 : Angoulême International Comics Festival Prize for a Series at the 42nd Angoulême Festival

== Work consulted ==
- Lastman (animated TV series)
