= Le blog de Frantico =

French webcomic

- Author: Frantico (pseudonym)
- Website: http://www.zanorg.com/frantico/
- Launch date: January 1, 2005
- End date: October 15, 2005
- Genre: Auto-biographical

Le blog de Frantico (Frantico's Blog) is a French webcomic authored by Frantico. It ran daily from January 1 to May 31, 2005, and occasionally until 15 October, 2005. The webcomic was presented as an autobiographical work by an aspiring cartoonist named Frantico, who chronicles his daily life. Le blog de Frantico was compiled into a comic book published by Albin Michel in October 2005, and it was nominated for the 2006 Prize for First Comic Book at the Angoulême International Comics Festival

After the end of Le blog de Frantico, the creator authored other webcomics under the alias Frantico. The real identity of their author has been a subject of speculation and today it is often assumed that Frantico is a heteronym created by author Lewis Trondheim.

== Content ==
Le blog de Frantico is a webcomic written in the first person, that chronicles the daily life of Frantico (whose real name, according to the protagonist, is François), a single, 30-year-old, obese, balding, anxious freelance graphic designer living in Paris, who aspires to leave his job and become a professional cartoonist. He also details his sex life, including his habits with masturbation and watching pornography, as well as his sexual fantasies, notably revolving around anal sex.

Frantico often interacts with a large, unnamed, foul-mouthed, blue-eyed, talking orange cat, which can only be seen by Frantico, and whose dialogue with Frantico acts as a role similar to the shoulder devil in popular imagery. Later, its opposite counterpart appears, taking the form of an angry stereotypical tribesman speaking broken French and wearing only a loincloth, loudly warning Frantico against any risky ventures.

In the context of the story, Frantico is working on an ambitious graphic novel project, while drawing his daily misadventures for his own amusement, until he is encouraged by his friends and other cartoonists to publish them on the Internet, thus making Le blog de Frantico.

The comic as a whole has little continuity, although it has running gags and features some short-lived story arcs. At first, it ran daily from January 1 to May 31, 2005. The last stories of this period comprised a story arc in which Frantico was invited to a (fictional) international blog convention in Seoul, where he meets and falls in love with Coralie, an interpreter who eventually seems to reciprocate. In the last story, after Frantico misses his plane back to Paris, he decides to go to Coralie's home, leaving the orange cat and the tribesman wondering if they should follow him.

Then, the comic sporadically published "bonus" stories from June 2 to October 15, 2005, some of which showing Frantico apparently dating Coralie in South Korea. On December 15, 2005, the author published a blog post announcing the end of the webcomic.

A comic book compilation of Le blog de Frantico was published by Albin Michel in October 2005.

== Author ==
The identity of Frantico was a subject of speculation among readers, and there was theories that behind the alias of Frantico, supposedly a beginning cartoonist, was really a professional. Similarities were noted between the style of "Frantico" and that of Lewis Trondheim, and Trondheim alternately confirmed and denied being the author of the blog. In 2006, a graphic designer named Sébastien Lesage stepped up and claimed that he was Frantico, thanking Trondheim for maintaining the mystery around his identity. The auto-biographical nature of the Frantico webcomic has been confirmed to be false. Later, several publications assumed Trondheim as the author of Le Blog de Frantico. On his personal website, Lewis Trondheim added Le blog de Frantico to the list of his works, playfully stating "Rumor has it that I made this book, but that's not true". In 2020, Le Blog de Frantico was also included in a retrospective exhibition on the works of Lewis Trondheim.

== Other works ==
The author created other webcomics under the alias Frantico. On May 6, 2007, he launched a new webcomic Nico Shark, a political satire taking place in the fictional company "France Pin's" where the eponymous protagonist has just been hired as chief human resources officer. The protagonist is a caricature of Nicolas Sarkozy, who at the time had just been elected president of France; other characters are as well caricatures of several politicians, and the plot reflects the political situation of France by transposing it in the context of a company. The webcomic ended on June 19, 2007, when its contents were replaced with a fake error message implying that the website was pirated by the government's intelligence service. Frantico and Kévin "Kek" Nave (developer of the websites of Nico Shark and Le blog de Frantico) confirmed the end of Nico Shark, and added that the servers of the websites had been subjected to several denial-of-service attacks since Nico Shark launched. Frantico also explained his growing lack of motivation in making political satire as the main reason for the end of Nico Shark. The comic was published as a book, Nico Shark, un ami pour cinq ans, by Delcourt, in Trondheim's collection Shampooing.

In 2009, the author began another webcomic under the alias Frantico, Mega Krav Maga, in collaboration with cartoonist Mathieu Sapin. The webcomic narrates the misadventures of satirical versions of Frantico and Sapin as they discover a secret martial art called Mega-Krav-Maga, while invited to a comics convention in Lisbon. The webcomic was eventually published in two books by Delcourt in 2010.

== Bibliography ==
- Frantico (2005). Le blog de Frantico. Albin Michel. ISBN 2-226-16667-X.
- Frantico (2007). Nico Shark. Shampooing (Delcourt). ISBN 978-2-7560-1275-9.
- Trondheim, Lewis; Sapin, Mathieu; Frantico (2010). MKM: Mega-Krav-Maga 1. Delcourt. ISBN 978-2-7560-1854-6.
- Trondheim, Lewis; Sapin, Mathieu; Frantico (2010). MKM: Mega-Krav-Maga 2. Delcourt. ISBN 978-2-7560-2060-0.
- Trondheim, Lewis; Sapin, Mathieu; Frantico (2022). MKM: Mega-Krav-Maga: Intégrale. Shampooing (Delcourt). ISBN 978-2413028390.
