= Daou Technology Inc. =

Korean multinational marketing company

Daou Technology Inc. (주)다우기술
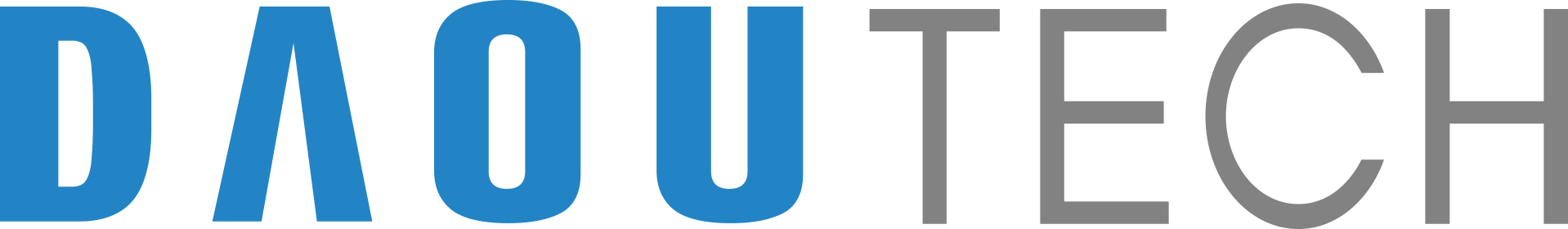
- Type: Public
- Traded as: KRX: 023590
- Industry: Engineering
- Founded: January 9, 1986
- Founder: Kim Ik-Rae (chairman)
- Headquarters: Daou Digital Square 6th floor, 81, Digital valley-ro, Suji-gu, Yongin-si, Gyeonggi-do, Korea
- Key people: Kim Youn-Duck (CEO)
- Revenue: $181M USD (2017)
- Operating income: $20M USD (2017)
- Total assets: $705M USD (2017)
- Number of employees: 469 (2017)
- Website: http://www.daou.com/index.php/en http://www.daou.com/

Daou Technology Inc. (Korean: 다우기술, KRX: 023590), Republic of Korea, is a public multinational company that specializes in marketing communication and commerce products and services, applications for enterprise, and IDC including IT consulting service. Daou Technology was founded in 1986 by Kim Ik-Rae, who played a leading role in the advancement of database management system and web technology by localizing Informix RDBMS software and Netscape web browser for the first time in 1995.

An initial public offering (IPO) took place in Korea Stock Exchange on August 27, 1997, and Daou Technology announced plans to expand its business into the finance industry. In January 2000, the company set up an online stock brokerage service, Kiwoom Securities (Korean: 키움증권, Kiwoom Securities Co., Ltd., KRX: 039490), the company's most notable effort to become the nation's first online brokerage provider. Daou Technology has been a parent company since Kiwoom Securities' establishment, and possesses 47.7 percent of stake in the ownership of Kiwoom Securities as of the end of FY2017.

Entering 2000, the company focused on software and IT consulting services to improve profitability as profit margins of the hardware business had fallen. It established partnerships with global software companies such as IBM, VMware, Citrix, and Red Hat, providing technical support in areas including cloud computing, virtualization, open source, and SaaS (software as a service). The company merged with Unitel Network, which was an affiliated company, to secure web services, and supplied services such as PPurio, enFax, Minisum, DaouPay, Unicro, DonutBook, SmartPush and DCSms. In 2010, the company developed SmartProcess, its own CRM service, and Team Office, designed for cooperation and communication.

The company moved its headquarters to Jukjeon Yongin, named the Digital Valley, in 2010.

The company's rapid growth has triggered a chain of own products, acquisitions, and partnerships. It offers marketing communication products and services (ppurio, biz ppurio, donutbook, enFax, Callmix, Biz mailer), commerce services (SNS Form, Unicro), and enterprise mail product (Terrace Mail). It released IT infrastructure and related outsourcing services (Daou IDC, Daou Cloud) in 2013. It launched Daou Office designed for work and productivity in April 2014.

Kim Youn-Duck was appointed CEO of the company in January 2016. In 2018, it launched an online commerce inventory management service (Sabangnet), merging with Korea ASP. It holds 45 percent of market share by sales revenues in the domestic multi-channel management market.

== History ==
• 2018.08 Merged with Sabangnet, multi-channel product and order management service
• 2016.04 Launched TERRACE MAIL Security / Merger with delphinet
• 2016.03 Launched SNS Form
• 2016.01 Spin-off KIDARI ENT
• 2015.11 Acquired Text Messaging service business
• 2015.10 Acquired a portion of Delitoon
• 2015.09 Launched DaouOffice 2.0
• 2015.08 Launched Telpass
• 2014.11 Atlantis Computing Distributor
• 2014.09 CommVault Distributor
• 2014.07 Nimble Storage Distributor
• 2014.03 Launched DaouOffice (Groupware)
• 2012.01 Riverbed Distributor
• 2011.09 Quantum Distributor
• 2011.09 Launched Officetalk (Enterprise SNS)
• 2010.09 Launched Smart Process
• 2008.06 Acquired Terrace Technologies
• 2008.10 EnterpriseDB Distributor
• 2008.03 Established Internet Platform Research Institute
• 2008.03 Established Messaging Research Institute
• 2007.09 BakBone Software Distributor
• 2006.11 RedHat Distributor
• 2006.02 Citrix Distributor
• 2005.12 Digital Knowledge Management Award
• 2005.09 VMware Distributor
• 2005.03 Chairman of Korea Software Association
• 2004.03 IBM S/W Distributor
• 2001.05 Developed Winipmail
• 2000.07 Developed Webstore 5.0
• 1999.09 Developed integrated messaging system-Qrio
• 1998.04 Order of Industrial Service Merit
• 1997.08 Listed on KSE
• 1995.10 Netscape Distributor
• 1994.05 Registered in off board market Multi-media Tech Award
• 1991.01 Developed Korea VGA Board
• 1987.12 First domestic Korean RDBMS
• 1986.01 Established Daou Tech.

== Subsidiaries and Affiliates (As of FY2018 Q2) ==
IT: Daou Data(Payment service and IT), KICA(Korean Information Certificate Authority Inc., Public certification authority), Mirae Technology(OTP)

Finance: Kiwoom Securities(Online brokerage service provider), Kiwoom Asset Management(Equities, fixed income, infrastructure and real estate), Kioom Savings Bank, Kiwoom Yes Saving Bank, Kiwoom Investment(Venture capital), Kiwoom Asset Planner(GA/Financial planning), Kiwoom Private Equity.

Contents & Service: Saramin(Online job portal), Saramin HS(Manpower outsourcing), Kidari Studio(Webtoon and web novel platform), KidariEnt(Visual content distribution), Imazins(Stock photo agency), eMoney(Financial content service), Wisebirds(SNS advertising agency), Kiwoom Estate&Service(Real estate development & management) Global: Daou Japan, Daou Dalian, Daou Hong Kong, Kiwoom Securities Indonesia, Kiwoom Investment Management Indonesia
