= Aya of Yop City (film) =

- Film poster
- Directed by: Marguerite Abouet; Clément Oubrerie
- Based on: Aya of Yop City by Marguerite Abouet and Clément Oubrerie
- Produced by: Antoine Delesvaux; Clément Oubrerie; Joann Sfar
- Starring: Aïssa Maïga; Tatiana Rojo; Tella Kpomahou; Jacky Ido; Émil Abossolo-Mbo; Eriq Ebouaney
- Production companies: Autochenille Production; TF1 Droits Audiovisuels
- Distributed by: UGC Distribution
- Release date: 17 July 2013 (France)
- Running time: 84 minutes
- Countries: France; Côte d'Ivoire
- Language: French
- Box office: $314.000

Aya of Yop City (French title: Aya de Yopougon) is a 2013 French animated film directed by Marguerite Abouet and Clément Oubrerie and based on the graphic novel Aya of Yop City by the same authors. It was released on 17 July in France. It was nominated for the Best Animated Feature Film at the 39th César Awards.

== Plot ==
The film takes place near the end of the 70s in the Yopougon neighborhood in Côte d'Ivoire. The story revolves around the lives of 19-year-old Aya and her friends and family. Aya's mother, Fanta, is the most trusted healer in the neighborhood. Aya's father Ignace is a salesman for the crumbling Solibra Brewery, owned by the magnate Bonaventure Sissoko. Aya is a studious young woman with dreams of studying medicine, but is opposed by her father, who wants her to get married and start a family. In contrast, Aya's best friends Bintou and Adjoua flirt with boys, party, and dream of opening beauty salons.

Everything changes when Adjoua gets pregnant during one of her flings. Deciding between getting an abortion or telling her family, Adjoua decides to go through with the pregnancy and claims the father is Moussa, the lazy and immature son of Sissoko and heir to Solibra Brewery. In reality, Moussa is not the father, but Adjoua convinces everyone in order to marry him and secure wealth and social status for her family. Sometime after the marriage and birth of the child, Sissoko becomes suspicious of Adjoua when he realizes the baby does not look like Moussa. The baby's father is revealed to be none other than the local playboy, Mamadou.

Meanwhile, Aya's other friend Bintou is having an affair with a "Parisian" named Gregoire, who unbeknownst to Bintou is actually a local imposter who saves up money for his womanizing escapades. Bintou hopes Gregoire will take her with him to Paris so she can live a luxurious life. Aya's father also has a small subplot involving a secret affair with his secretary, which he desperately tries to hide from his family amidst his crumbling job security.

== Cast ==
- Aïssa Maïga: Aya
- Tella Kpomahou: Bintou
- Tatiana Rojo: Adjoua
- Jacky Ido: Ignace / Hervé / Moussa / Basile / Sidiki / Arsène
- Émil Abossolo-Mbo: Kossi / Dieudonné / Gervais / Father Mamadou
- Eriq Ebouaney: Hyacinthe
- Pascal N'Zonzi: Bonaventure Sissoko
- Atou Ecaré: Simone Sissoko
- Claudia Tagbo: Jeanne / Alphonsine
- Sabine Pakora: Koro / Modestine
- Jean-Baptiste Anoumon: Grégoire
- Djédjé Apali: Mamadou
- Mokobé: DJ
- Corinne Haccandy: Félicité
- Diouc Koma: John Pololo
- Marguerite Abouet: Fanta

== Production ==
Aya de Yopougon is the second animated film from the production studio Autochenille Production, co-founded by Joann Sfar and Clément Oubrerie, and dedicated to producing animated films adapted from comics. The first film was The Rabbi's Cat, adapted from the comic book of the same name by Joann Sfar. The second is logically adapted from the comic book by Marguerite Abouet and Clément Oubrerie. Since the comic book is too long (six volumes) to be fully adapted into a single film, the film's screenplay only adapts the plot of the first two volumes. The recording of the dialogues preceded the actual animation, allowing the animators to sync their work with the voices. A first draft of the film was created with temporary voices, including that of Marguerite Abouet, the screenwriter of the comic book, for the female characters; the final dubbing was then recorded once the voice actors were chosen. The animation was handled by Banjo Studio, the animation studio founded at the same time as Autochenille Production. The film has a budget of between 6 and 7 million euros.

== Reception ==
In France, the film received a positive reception from both critics and the public. In the monthly film magazine Positif, Michel Roudévitch believes that the film is a good adaptation of the comic book Aya de Yopougon: he finds the film ''faithful (in terms of content and form) to the antics and entanglements of the first two episodes of this delightful comedy.'' The newspaper Ouest-France gave the film three stars out of four and appreciates the originality of the graphics compared to high-budget animated films released during the same summer (''we are far from the outpouring of images created all in the same mold of computers, like Hollywood productions'') as well as the fidelity to the original comic book and the fact that ''the picturesque and (...) exoticism in the recreation of settings and characters'' is balanced by ''the search for a certain realism in the description of a contemporary society'', both in the imagery and the plot as well as in the language that incorporates local slang. The Christian daily La Croix also provides a very favorable review, in which Yaël Eckert appreciates both the aesthetics and voices of the film, as well as the use of local slang, humor, and the highlighting of the resourcefulness of female characters; he favorably compares the film to previous adaptations of comics by their original authors, such as Persepolis by Marjane Satrapi and The Rabbi's Cat by Joann Sfar.

For Cécile Mury in Télérama, ''Everything is overflowing with life (...), the colors vibrate'', and the depiction of 1970s life in the Yopougon neighborhood is ''tender, but not idealized''. In the daily Le Monde, Jacques Mandelbaum has a more mixed opinion on this subject: he considers the universe of the film ''alas a bit tainted by prettiness and dilution'' and sees ''chromos of Abidjan''. In L'Express, Christophe Carrière conversely finds that it is the animation that poses a problem, due to a ''fluidity below what we are now accustomed to'', but that the screenplay compensates for this flaw with ''quirky and enlightening situations'' and a reflection on a universal subject.

In Le Parisien, Christophe Levent gives Aya de Yopougon two stars out of three and sees it as ''a good family entertainment'', stating that the animation, which he describes as ''old-school'', seems appropriate for the subject; however, he feels that the film is not rhythmic enough to generate enthusiasm.

According to a review from Libération, ''the final result leaves a mixed feeling, as if the elements of the comic, when animated, became at times more childish, and at other times more kitsch''; although ''not exactly dishonorable'', the film seems ''to [lack] a certain madness, and perhaps, quite simply... resources''.

== Box office ==
In France, the film was released on 17 July 2013 and was screened in 90 theaters. It drew 44,926 entries in its first week, 29,347 in the second week, 19,560 in the third week, and 14,300 in the fourth week, totaling just over 108,100 entries after one month of release.

== Accolades ==
Year	Award	Category	Result
2014	César Award	Best Animated Film	Nominated
