= Ruppert & Mulot =

Former French comic book creator duo

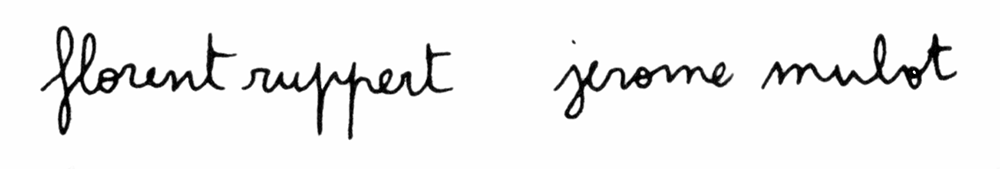
Signatures of Ruppert and Mulot

Ruppert & Mulot was a duo of French comic book creators formed by Florent Ruppert (born 1979) and Jérôme Mulot (born 1981), authors of comics titles like The Perineum Technique (2014) and The Extraordinary Part (2021). They ceased collaborating in 2023 after Ruppert was implicated in a case of sexual violence.

== Life and career ==
Jérôme Mulot and Florent Ruppert met at the École Nationale Supérieure d'Art de Dijon. They created the fanzine Del Aventure, which they distributed at festivals, and which caught the attention of Patrice Killoffer. They had already developed their working method: each contributed to both the drawing and the script. The stories are graphic dialogues between the two authors.

They were published in small-circulation alternative magazines (Bile Noire, Le nouveau journal de Judith et Marinette) in 2004. Jean-Christophe Menu, enthusiastic about the strips published in Ferraille Illustré #26 in January 2005, offered them a job with L'Association. Safari Monseigneur, published in the Ciboulette collection at the end of 2005, gave them a wider audience. From then on, Ruppert and Mulot were part of L'Association's team, contributing to the magazines L'Éprouvette (in the first issue of which they revealed their original method of signing books, which consisted of immortalizing part of their conversation with the person concerned in comic strip form), Lapin, and releasing two more albums with this publisher in 2006.

Their work, which offers a new approach to storytelling and panel layout, notably through the use of "tree structure" (a series of alternating vertical speech bubbles) and improvisation, has been very well received, as evidenced by the "Essential Revelation" prize awarded to Panier de Singe (Barrel of Monkeys) at the 2007 Angoulême Festival.

=== End of the partnership ===
In May 2023, a Mediapart investigation implicated Florent Ruppert in allegations of sexual assault, which he denied. In August and September 2021, he was the subject of two complaints, one for "sexual assault" and the other for "rape"; the case was dismissed in August, the prosecutor's office considering that "the offense was insufficiently substantiated." In September, he was expelled from the workshop he had co-founded. Mediapart mentions about ten testimonies from women implicating him to varying degrees.

The revelations came a few months after the Bastien Vivès affair, which revealed the dysfunctions of part of the industry and allowed the emergence of a #MeToo movement in comics.

Jérôme Mulot says he was "completely taken aback" when he discovered the existence of the complaints, and announced on his Instagram account in April 2023 that he was ending their collaboration, while praising "the courage of the women who spoke out and [giving] them his public support."

== Published works ==
=== As a duo ===
- Safari Monseigneur, L'Association, coll. « Ciboulette », 2005.
- La Poubelle de la Place Vendôme, L'Association, coll. « Patte de Mouche », 2006.
- Panier de singe (Barrel of Monkeys), L'Association, coll. « Ciboulette », 2006.
- Gogo Club, L'Association, coll. « Mimolette », 2007.
- Le Tricheur, L'Association, coll. « Éperluette », 2008. Sélection officielle du Festival d'Angoulême 2009.
- Sol Carrelus, L'Association, coll. « Éperluette », 2008.
- Irène et les clochards, L'Association, coll. « Ciboulette », 2009.
- Le Royaume, L'Association, 2011.
- Un cadeau, L'Association, Hors Collection, 2013.
- La Technique du périnée (The Perineum Technique), Dupuis, coll. « Aire libre », 2014.
- Famille royale, L'Association, 2015.
- Les week-ends de Ruppert & Mulot, Dupuis, coll. « Aire libre », 2016.
- Soirée d'une faune, L'Association, 2018.
- Les Petits Boloss, L'Association, coll. « Ciboulette », 2020.
- La part merveilleuse : Les mains d'Orsay (The Extraordinary Part Book One – Orsay’s Hands), Dargaud, coll. « Visions du futur », 2021.
- La part merveilleuse : Les yeux de Juliette (The Extraordinary Part - Volume 2–Juliette's Eyes), Dargaud, coll. « Visions du futur », 2022.

=== With other authors ===
- La Grande Odalisque (The Grande Odalisque), with Bastien Vivès, Dupuis, coll. « Aire libre », 2012.
- Olympia, with Bastien Vivès, Dupuis, coll. « Aire libre », 2015 - Sélection officielle du Festival d'Angoulême 2016.
- Portrait d'un buveur, (Portrait of a Drunk) avec Schrauwen, Dupuis, coll. « Aire libre », 2019.
