= Manon Bresch =

French-Cameroonian actress (born 1998)

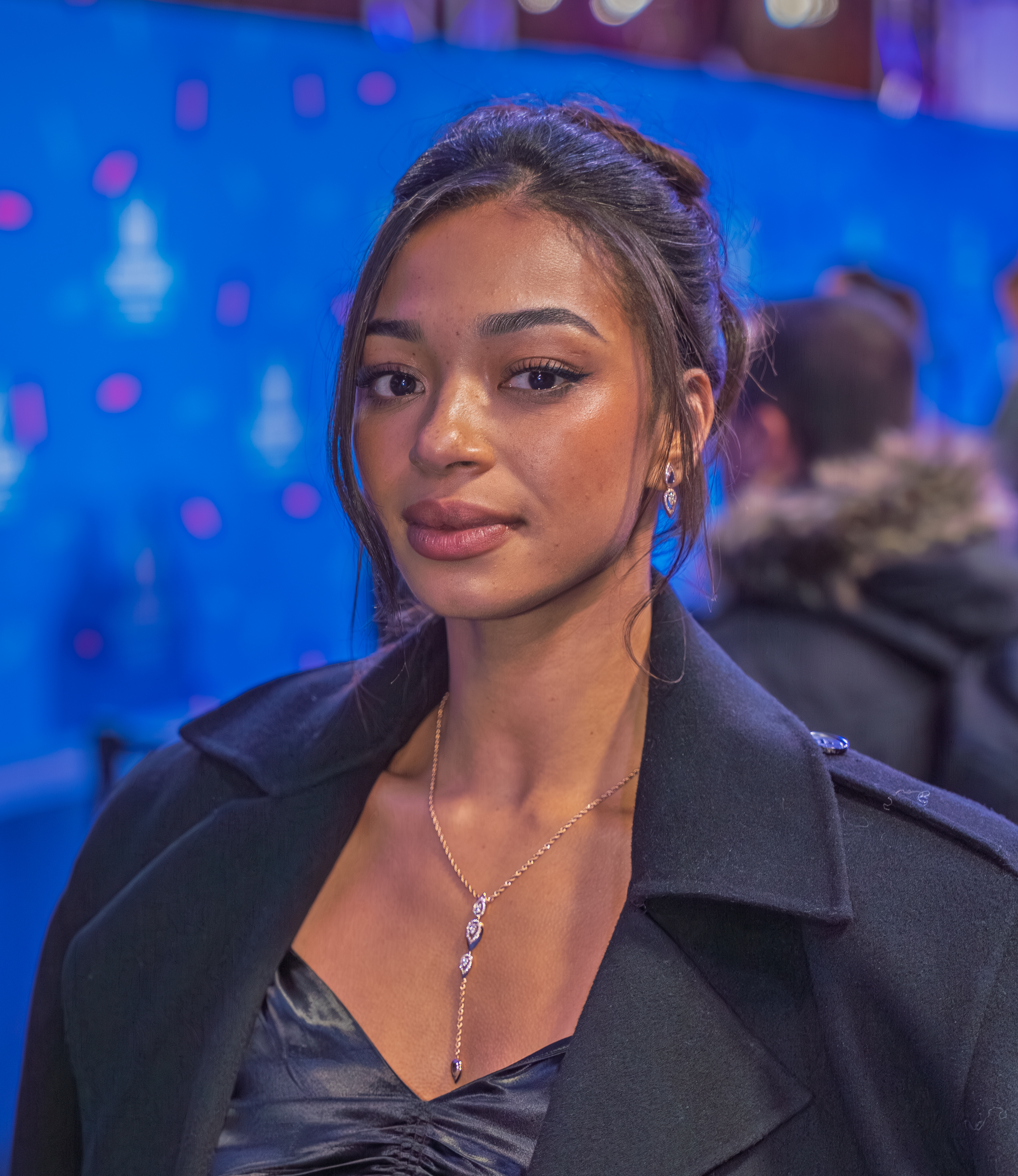
- Bresch in 2026
- Born: January 4, 1998 (age 28); Strasbourg
- Occupation: Actress
- Years active: 2012–present

Manon Bresch (born 4 January 1998) is a French actress.

== Biography ==
Bresch attended the drama school Cours Florent in Paris for twelve years. She has Cameroonian ancestry and has visited there on vacation. Bresch made her film debut in 2012, with a small role in Les Papas du dimanche.

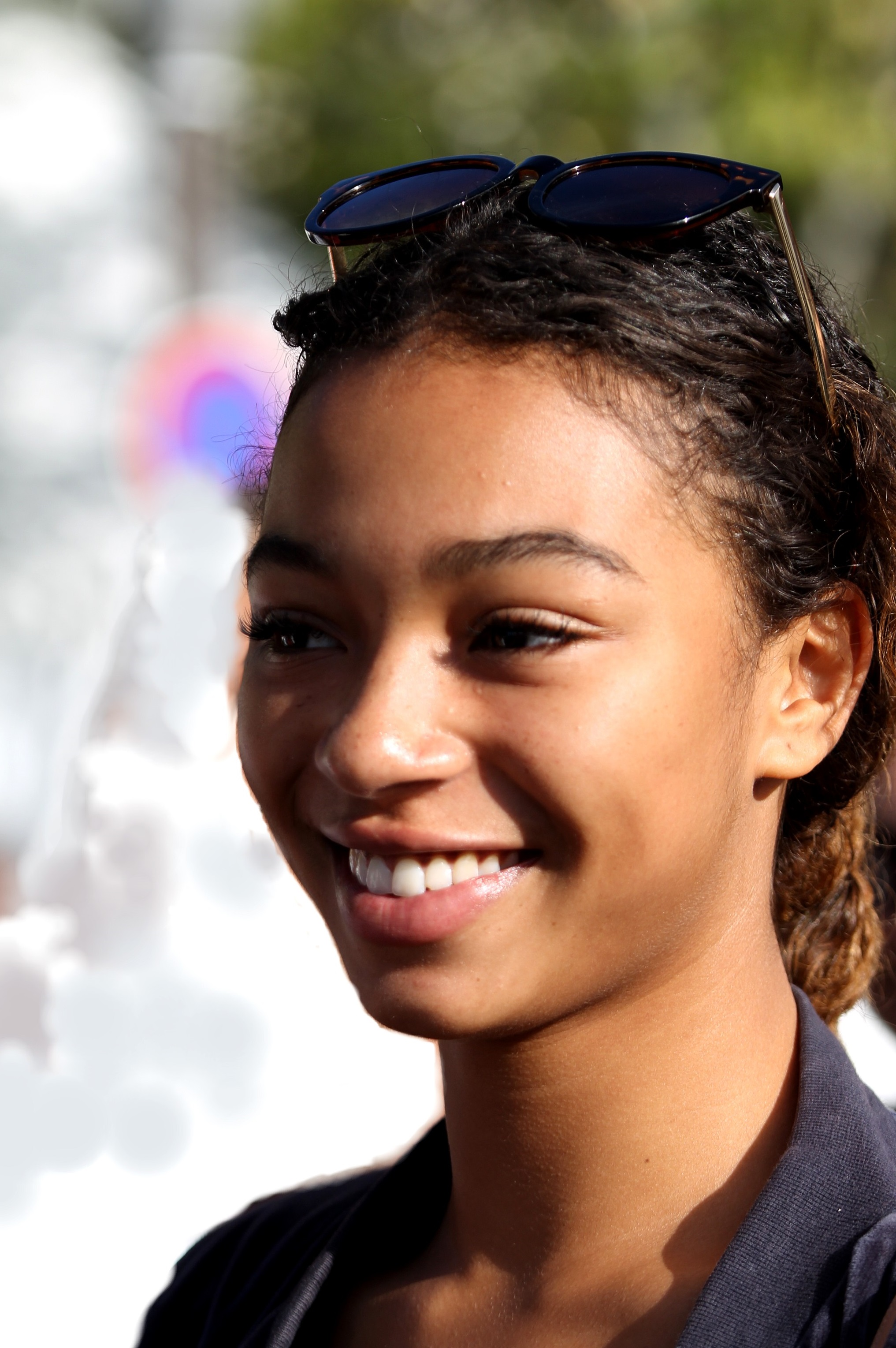
Bresch in 2016

Bresch began playing Yasmine, a close friend of Salomé, in the TV series Clem in 2015. In September 2015, Bresch was cast as Thérèse Marci, the adopted daughter of Thomas and Gabriel, in the soap opera Plus belle la vie. The actress who originally played the character, Tia Diagne, left to pursue other acting opportunities. In 2017, Bresch played Charlotte Castillon, a young jogger who is inexplicably murdered in plain sight, in the TV film Noir enigma. Bresch starred as Luisa, a student with abilities in voodoo, in the 2019 supernatural murder-mystery TV series Mortel. In 2020, she played Sirley, a troublesome student from French Guiana, in Maledetta primavera.

Bresch speaks French, English, and some Spanish. She practices judo, tennis, and contemporary dance.

== Filmography ==
=== Films ===
- 2012 : Les Papas du dimanche by Louis Becker : child
- 2016 : We Are Family by Gabriel Julien-Laferrière : friend of Oscar
- 2018 : I'm Going Out for Cigarettes by Osman Cerfon : Louise (short film)
- 2020 : The Third War by Giovanni Aloï : Jenny
- 2020 : Maledetta primavera by Elisa Amoruso : Sirley
- 2023 : A Place to Fight For by Romain Cogitore : Fred
- 2023 : Wingwomen by Mélanie Laurent : Sam
- 2023 : Les cœurs en chien by Léo Fontaine : Océane (short film)
- 2024 : Jeunesse, mon amour by Léo Fontaine : Lila
- 2025 : Muganga - Celui qui soigne by Marie-Hélène Roux : Maïa Cadière
- 2026 : Kraken by Mohamed Chabane et Theo jourdain : Mélia

=== Television ===
- 2015 - 2018 : Clem as Yasmine
- 2015 - 2019 : Plus belle la vie : Thérèse Marci
- 2017 : Noir enigma : Charlotte Castillon (TV movie)
- 2017 : Des jours meilleurs : Cindy
- 2017 : La stagiaire : Aminata Diakhaté
- 2018 : Watch Me Burn : Clara (TV movie)
- 2019 : Les Grands : Maya
- 2019 - 2021 : Mortel : Luisa Manjimbe
- 2020 : Baron Noir : Lucie
- 2021 : Lama'scarade by François Descraques : Luisa (voice)
- 2022 : Détox by Marie Jardillier : Lilou
- 2026 : Privilèges by Marie Monge and Vladimir de Fontenay : Adèle

=== Clips ===
- 2018 : Leticia by Jazzy Bazz : Leticia
