= Marguerite Abouet =

Ivorian writer of bandes dessinées

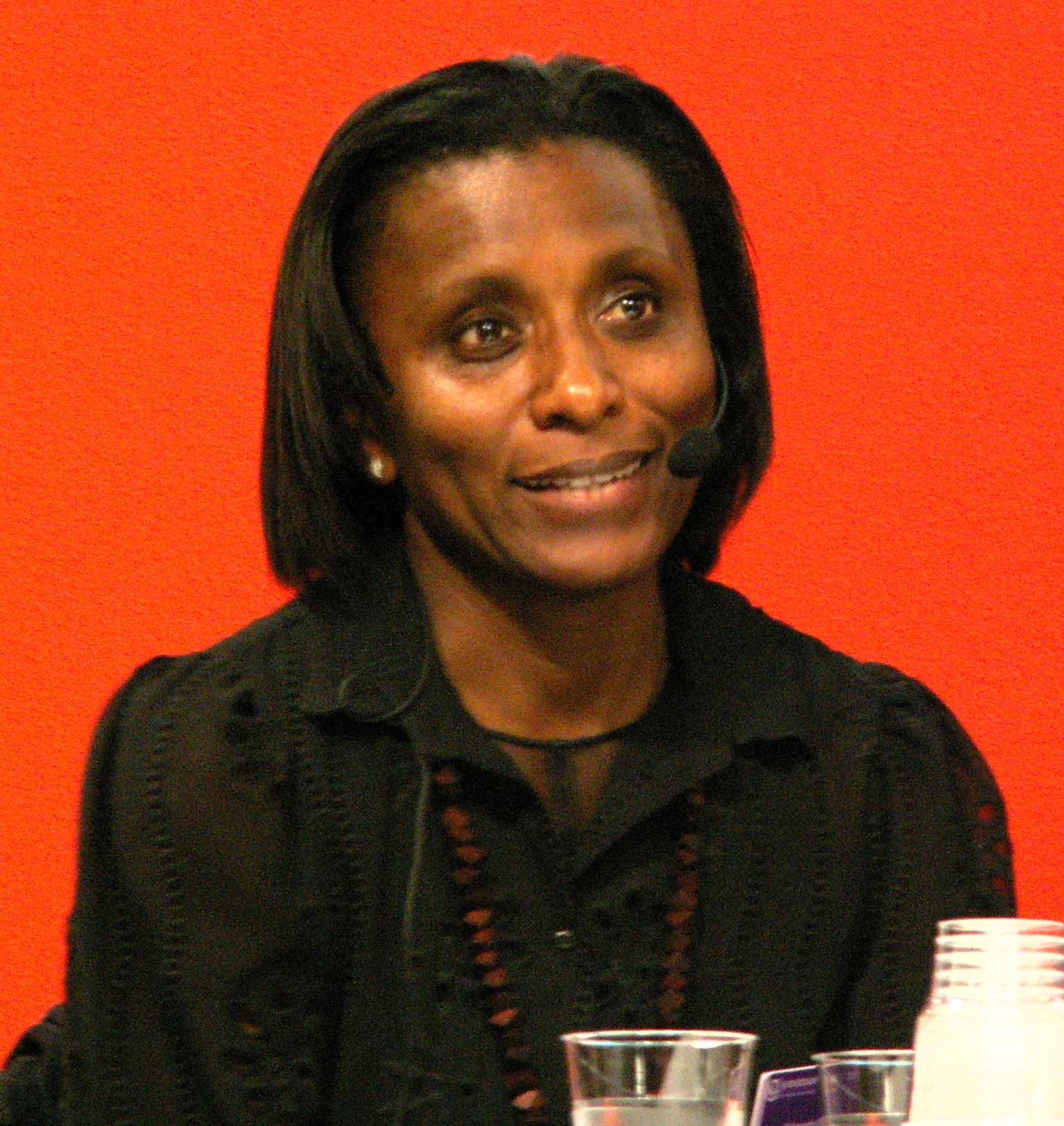
- Abouet in 2018
- Born: 1971 (age 54–55) Abidjan, Côte d'Ivoire
- Area: Writer
- Notable works: Aya
- Awards: Angoulême International Comics Festival Prize for First Comic Book (2006) "Rising Star Award for Best Self-Publisher" Glyph Comics Awards (2008)

Marguerite Abouet (born 1971) is the pen name of Patricia N’gbandjui, an Ivorian-French writer of bandes dessinées and film-director, best known for her graphic novel series Aya and Akissi.

== Biography ==
Abouet was born in 1971 in Abidjan, Côte d'Ivoire, and at the age of 12 she and her brother moved to France to their great uncle. She currently lives in Romainville, a suburb of Paris with her son. Her husband, illustrator Clément Oubrerie, illustrated her graphic concepts (he passed away in 2026).

She worked as a legal assistant in Paris while writing her first graphic novel, Aya. Abouet had tried to write novels for young people, but she gave up in frustration with what she perceived to be the constraints put on the genre by the publishers. She left her job as a legal assistant to concentrate on writing full-time.

Abouet's Ayabooks have been translated into 15 languages. Other works by Abouet include the children's book Akissi: Attaque de Chats (2010). In addition to her writing, she runs Des livres pour tous (Books for All), an organization that builds and supports libraries in Africa to promote literacy education for African children. In 2016, she was awarded a distinction of the "Ordre des Arts et des Lettres," a French distinction recognnizing significant contributions to the arts and literature. In 2023, she was awarded a distinction of the "Ordre national du Mérite."

== Education ==
Abouet finished her education in Paris, France.

== Aya ==
Aya is Abouet's first published work in 2005. It is also her first venture into graphic novels, as well as a collaborative effort with her husband, for whom Aya was the first time illustrating a graphic novel. She was influenced to do a graphic novel by Marjane Satrapi, the author of Persepolis. It also emerged from her desire to show an Africa with a focus on issues other than war and famine, which is typically what the media focus on in portraying Africa. Her characters attend school, trudge to work, plan for the future and are ensnared in domestic entanglements in Ivory Coast in the same way as happens everywhere else. The story has been adapted into an animated film, Aya of Yop City, co-directed by Abouet.

Abouet denies that Aya is autobiographical, except in the sense that it depicts the Ivory Coast that she is familiar with. The characters are based on people she knew growing up, but the situations are purely fictional.

Aya has been considered a success especially for a first-time author. It won the 2006 Angoulême International Comics Festival Prize for First Comic Book and sold over 200,000 copies in France alone, and over 350,000 worldwide by the time the second book came out. The Canadian publisher Drawn & Quarterly distributed the English-language version in the United States. They printed more than 10,000 copies, a significant number for a first-time graphic novel in the U.S. Abouet persuaded her French publisher to sell cheaper, soft-cover copies of the graphic novel in her native Ivory Coast. As of 2024, Aya and Akissi combined have sold over 1,000,000 copies.

Aya character designs' show diversity that help enhance the world that Abouet is trying to share. The design choices Abouet chooses enhance the African culture through its diversity through hairstyles, clothing, and facial expressions. The story is not told through a filter that explains the meaning behind every cultural aspect of the story and allows the reader to do their own research. Abouet tends to show what's happening rather than tell. Abouet uses sarcasm and satire to tell her story.

As of 2023, the Aya series includes 8 graphic novels, 7 of which have been released in English. According to The New York Times, Aya book sales surged during the George Floyd protests, and the series is experiencing a revival worldwide, especially in the French-speaking African diaspora.

== Akissi de Paris ==
In collaboration with cartoonist Mathieu Sapin, Abouet created a new character, Akissi.

== See also ==
- Atinuke (author)

== Sources ==
- Marguerite Abouet at the Grand Comics Database
- Marguerite Abouet at the Comic Book DB (archived from the original)
- Marguerite Abouet at Bedetheque (in French)
