= Ville Ranta =

Finnish comic artist and cartoonist

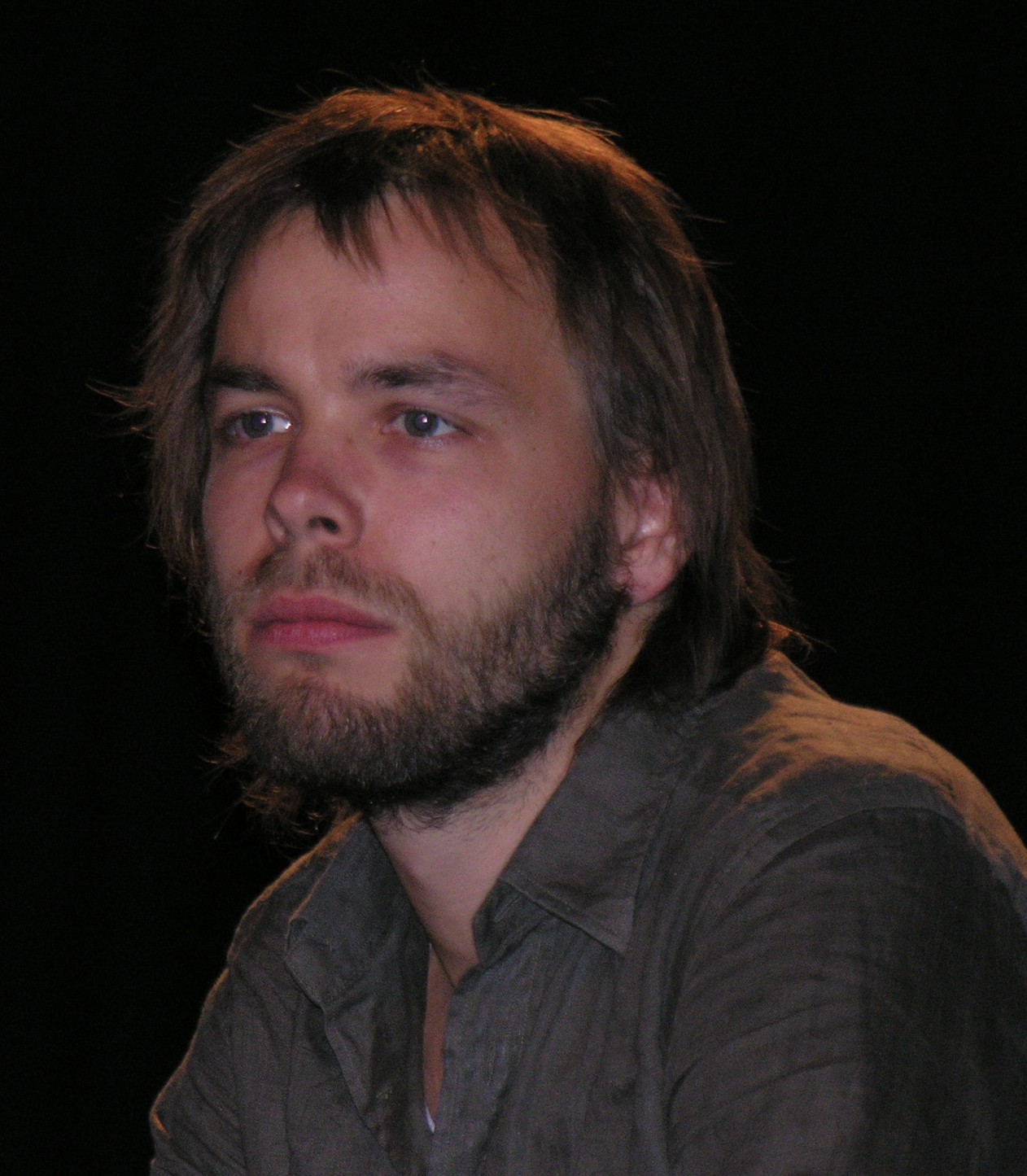
Ville Ranta

Ville Matias Ranta (born 29 November 1978) is a Finnish comic artist and cartoonist from Oulu. He received the Finnish comics society's Puupäähattu award in 2009. In his work, Ranta focus on controversial and provocative topics among other things. His comic Mohammed, Fear and Freedom of Speech (published in 2006 in the magazine Kaltio in reaction to the Muhammad cartoons controversy) led to the sacking of the editor Jussi Vilkuna. In 2017, he was made Knight of the National Order of Merit of France. He is the first Finnish comic artist to be admitted into the order.

== Selected works ==
- Matka Limpopoon (1992)
- Viime vuonna Kemissä (Asema 2002)
- Sade: Sarjakuvaromaani. Oulu: Asema, 2008. ISBN 978-952-99923-6-2.
- Engelsmannit tulevat! (Asema 2004)
- Isi on nyt vähän väsynyt (Asema 2005)
- Célebritiz. (Dargaud, 2006)
- Julkimot. Helsinki: WSOY, 2006. ISBN 951-0-32201-6.
- Kajaani. Oulu: Asema, 2008. ISBN 978-952-99923-3-1
- Eräänlaisia rukouksia. Helsinki: Huuda Huuda, 2009. ISBN 978-952-5724-08-0.
- Paratiisisarja. Helsinki: WSOY, 2010. ISBN 978-951-0-35801-6
