= Dupuy and Berberian =

French cartoonists

Philippe Dupuy and Charles Berberian
- Born: Dupuy: 15 December 1960 (age 65); Berberian: 28 May 1959 (age 67) France
- Areas: Cartoonist, Writer, Artist
- Notable works: Monsieur Jean
- Awards: Angoulême International Comics Festival Prize for First Comic Book, 1989; Angoulême International Comics Festival Prize for Best Comic Book, 1999; Inkpot Award, 2003; Grand Prix de la ville d'Angoulême, 2008

Philippe Dupuy (born 12 December 1960, Sainte-Adresse) and Charles Berbérian (born 28 May 1959, Baghdad) are French cartoonists most famous for their series of Franco-Belgian comics albums featuring the character Monsieur Jean.

Their collaboration is notable as they share every aspect of creating their stories, from plot through layouts, pencils and inks, to the extent that it is impossible to detect who is responsible for what. But in 2003, they decided to again work on their own, and have since published solo material like Hanté by Dupuy in 2005.

== Bibliography ==
- Le Petit Peintre (Magic Strip, 1985)
- Chantal Thomas (Michel Lagarde, 1987)
- Les Héros ne Meurent Jamais (L'Association, 1991)
- Le Monde est Fou (À Suivre, 1997) — based on a script by Vincent Ravalec
- Monsieur Jean 4: Vivons heureux sans avoir l'air (1999)
- The Complete Universe of Dupuy-Berberian (Oog en Blik, 2006)

== Awards ==
- 1989: Award for First Comic Book at the Angoulême International Comics Festival, France
- 1999: Award for Best French Comic Book at the Angoulême International Comics Festival
- 2003: Inkpot Award, United States
- 2006: nominated for Best Comic book at the Angoulême International Comics Festival (Philippe Dupuy only)
- 2008: Grand Prix de la ville d'Angoulême
