= Yves Bigerel =

French comics artist and animator

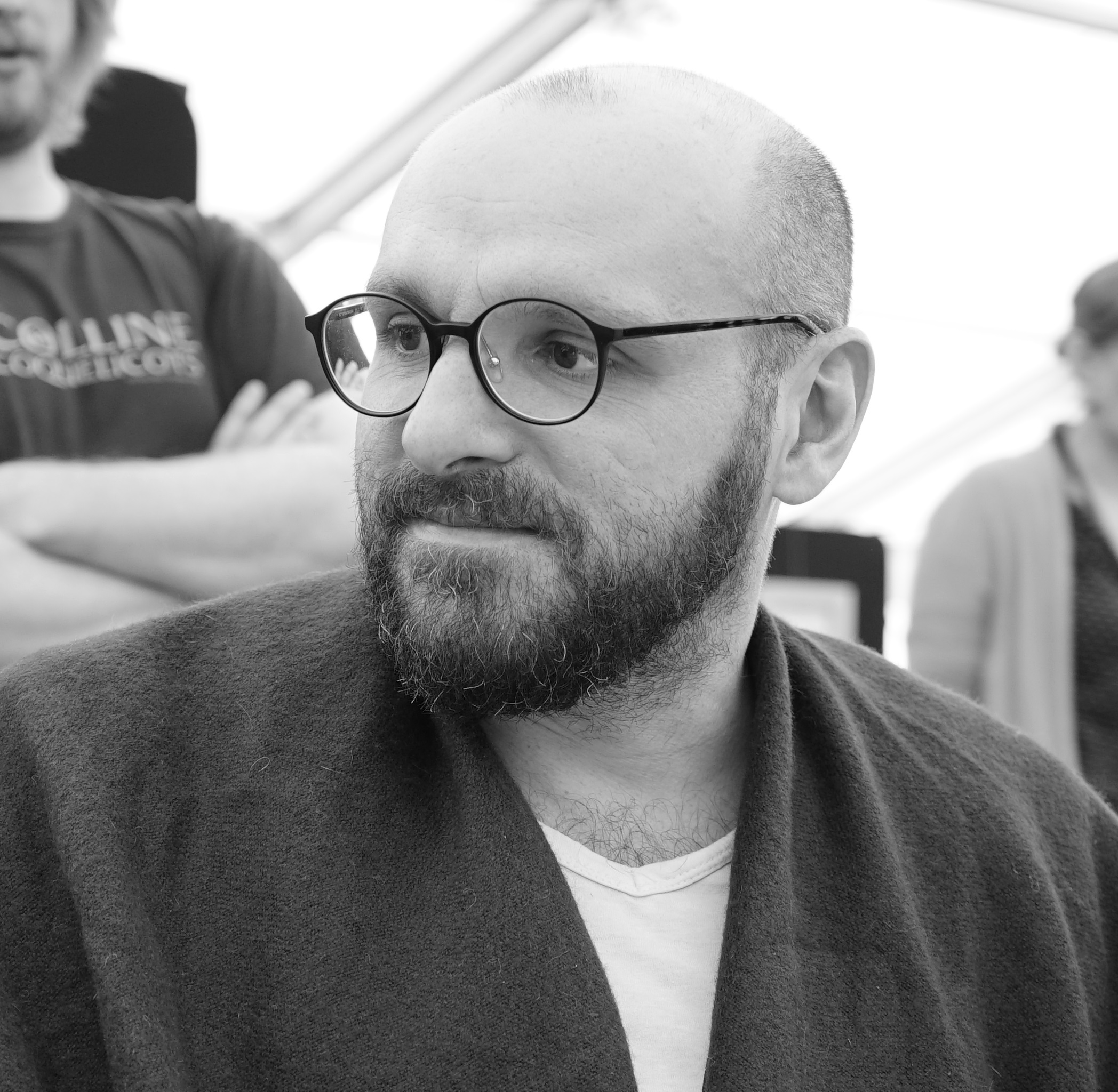
- Bigerel in 2017
- Born: 1 January 1979 (age 47); Nancy, France
- Occupations: Comics creator, artist, animator

Yves Bigerel, also known as "Balak" (born 1 January 1979), is a French comics artist and animator. He is mostly known in France for the comic book series Lastman. In 2009, Balak invented a new digital comics narrative technique which he called "turbomedia"; his work was noticed by Marvel editor Joe Quesada, who recruited him to help establish the Marvel digital imprint "Infinite Comics". He served as creative director and voice of the character Bullfrog on the 2023 adult animated series Captain Laserhawk: A Blood Dragon Remix.

== Biography ==
Bigerel initially studied philosophy, before completing a three-year course at Gobelins Cinéma Department of Animation in 2006. With Bastien Vivès and Michaël Sanlaville, he created in 2013 the French manga Lastman. The series won the 2015 Angoulême International Comics Festival Prix de la Série, and an animated adaptation has appeared on France 4.

He was present at the Bataclan during the November 2015 Paris attacks, but survived unharmed.
