= Ludovic Debeurme =

French comic artist

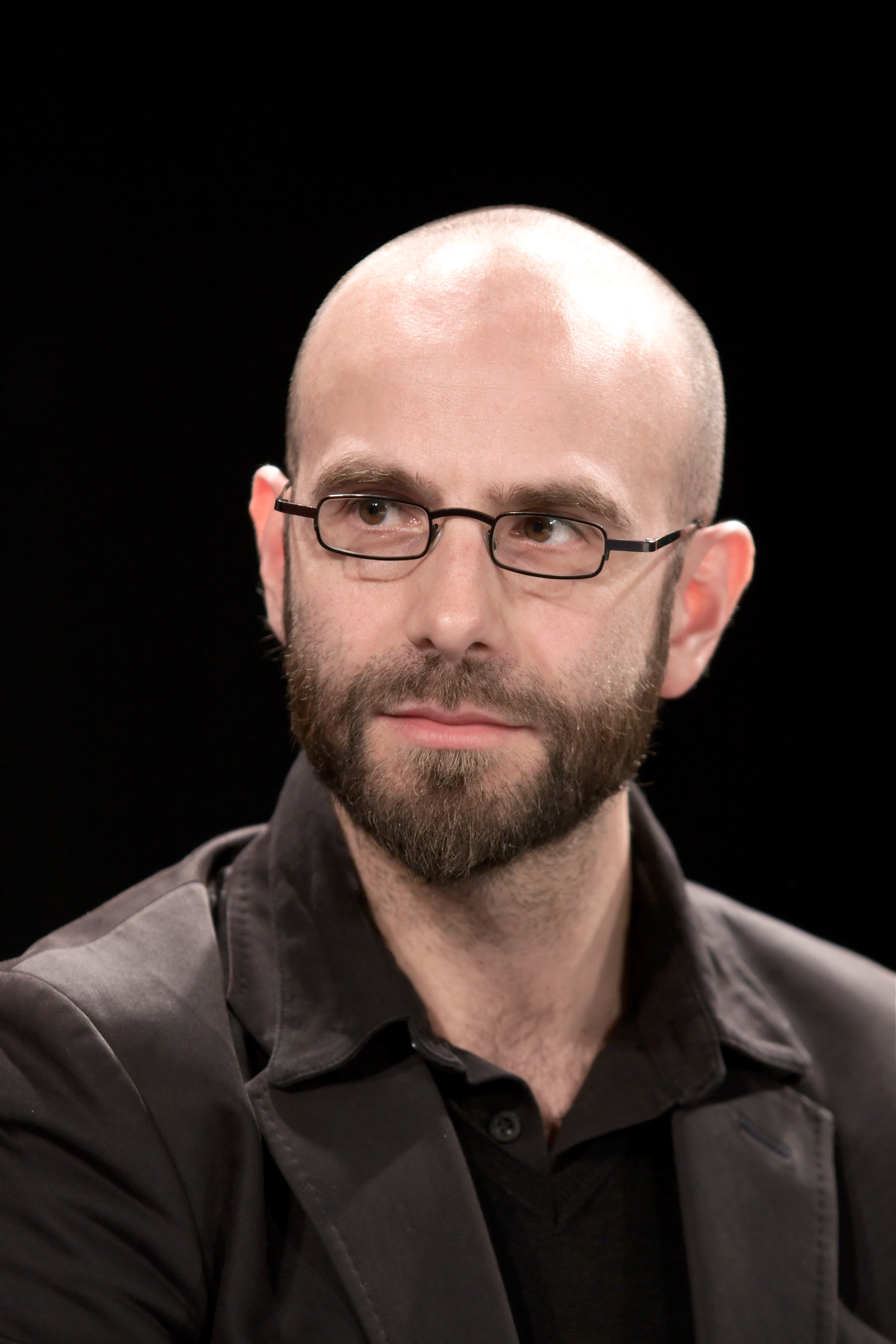
- Ludovic Debeurme in 2010
- Born: 1971 (age 54–55); France
- Occupations: Comic artist, Illustrator, Musician

Ludovic Debeurme is a French comic artist who has gained popularity in the US by his release of the English language graphic novel, Lucille.

== Education and career ==
Debeurme is a French graphic novelist and illustrator who was born in 1971. After studying fine art at the Sorbonne, he was first published in the anthology Comix 2000, followed by the acclaimed graphic novels Céfalus (2002) and Mes ailes d’homme (2003), the autobiographical story collection Ludologie (2003), and youth-oriented illustrated editions of the classics Dr. Jekyll and Mr. Hyde (2001), The Chancellor (2004), and Gargantua (2004).

His breakthrough came in 2006 with the release of Lucille, which won the René Goscinny Prize and was named one of the 5 "Essential" graphic novels of the Angoulême International Comics Festival. He followed that success with Le grand autre (2007), Le lac aux Vélies (2009), and Terra maxima (2010). The year 2011 saw his English-language debut with Lucille from Top Shelf, as well as the French release of Lucille's sequel, Renée.

He continues to write, draw, and play guitar in Paris.

== Books ==
- A story in Comix 2000, The Association, 1999. ISBN 2-84414-022-X
- Céfalus, Cornelius, et al. "Peter", 2002. ISBN 2-909990-83-4
- Ludology, Cornelius, et al. "Peter", 2003.
- My wing man, Éditions de l'An 2, 2003.
- Two pages is important to participate, Cornelius, et al. "Raoul", 2005.
- Lucille, Futuropolis, 2006. René Goscinny Prize in 2006, Essential of Angoulême Festival in 2007.
- The other big, Cornelius, 2007. Appointed Essentials Angoulême Festival in 2008.
- A story in good manners, etiquette of the Treaty on occasion chosen, Actes Sud -The Year 2, 2008.
- The lake vélies (with Nosfell texts) Futuropolis, 2009.
- Terra Maxima, Cornelius, 2010.
- Renee, Futuropolis, 2011.
- Epiphania

== Bibliography ==
- "Ludovic Debeurme / Top Shelf Productions". www.topshelfcomix.com.
