= Clément Oubrerie =

French comics artist (1966–2026)

Clement Oubrerie
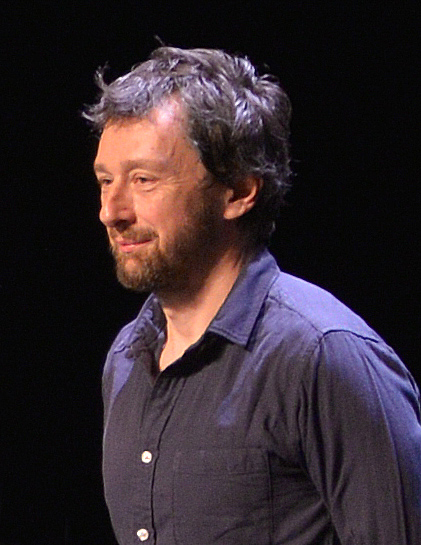
- Oubrerie in 2016
- Born: 23 December 1966; Paris, France
- Died: 1 March 2026 (aged 59)
- Education: Grenoble (fine arts)
- Occupations: Comics artist, illustrator
- Known for: Aya de Yopougon
- Notable work: Aya de Yopougon (with Marguerite Abouet); Pablo (with Julie Birmant)
- Parents: José Oubrerie (father); Michelle Nédélec (mother)

Clement Oubrerie (23 December 1966 – 1 March 2026) was a French comics artist.

== Education ==
Oubrerie studied fine arts in Grenoble. After completing his studies, he spent two years in the United States.

== Career ==
During his time in the United States, Oubrerie published his first children's books. Then he moved back to France and illustrated many books including the award-winning Les Mille mots de l’info, published by Gallimard. In 2005, his first volume of the series Aya de Yopougon was published by Gallimard.

Oubrerie served jail time in New Mexico for working without papers. He also co-founded the 3-D animation studio Station OMD and was a drummer in a funk band, in his spare time.

== Death ==
Oubrerie died on 1 March 2026, at the age of 59.
