= Bastien Vivès =

French comic book artist (born 1984)

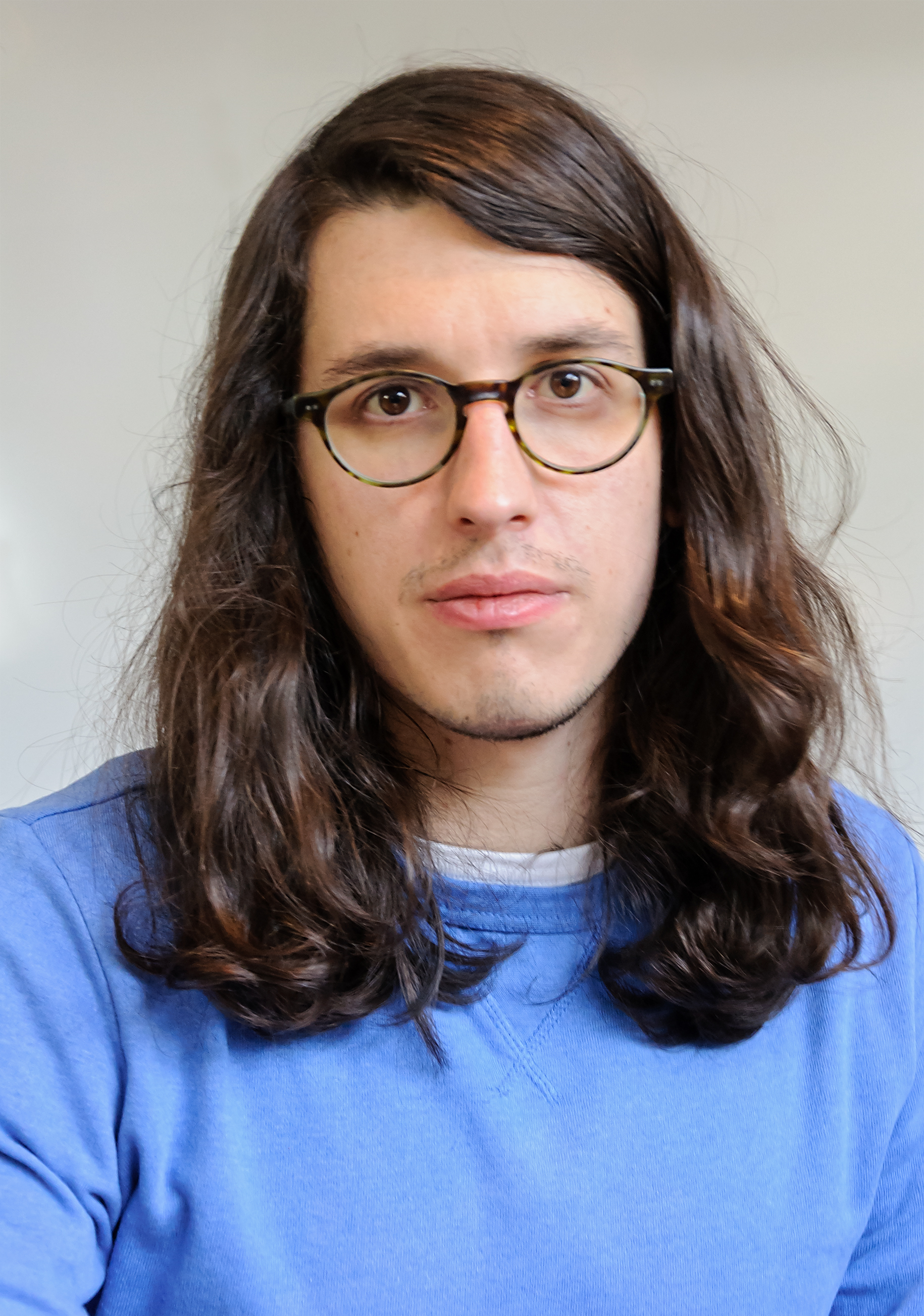
- Bastien Vivès at the 40th Angoulême International Comics Festival, 2013.
- Born: 11 February 1984 (age 42); Paris, France
- Occupation: Comic book artist

Bastien Vivès (born 11 February 1984) is a French comic book artist.

== Life and career ==
Born in Paris, Vivès spent his childhood drawing with his younger brother. He took live model classes from the age of 10 years. Vivès studied Applied arts at the Institut Sainte Geneviève Paris (6th) and three years at the Penninghen School of Graphic Arts in Paris and eventually Gobelins School, still in Paris, where he studied animation.

He achieved success first on the internet in 2002 on his BK Crew website under the pseudonym "Chanmax" with the character and comic strips of "Poungi la Racaille", which became viral, and was published in libraries in 2006 by Danger Public.

His first album, Elle(s), was published in 2007 by Casterman under the KSTR label. When he was 25 years old, in January 2009, Vivès received the Angoulême Festival Revelation Award for his album A Taste of Chlorine (Le goût du chlore). In France, he became considered as one of the most promising and successful comic artist of his generation.

In 2010 and 2011, he participated of the online drama Les Autres Gens, written by Thomas Cadène, drawing seven episodes.

In 2013, he published the "French manga" series Lastman, together with Michaël Sanlaville and Balak.

In 2021, his graphic novel Une sœur was adapted by Charlotte Le Bon into the theatrical feature film Falcon Lake, which premiered at the 2022 Cannes Film Festival.

In 2022, in the wake of the 50th anniversary of the International Festival of Angoulême, an exhibition featuring exclusive new illustrations by the artist (and no old ones) was programmed. Several petitions were launched to oppose this decision, claiming the Festival was putting in the spotlight an artist whose work was, if not encouraging, displaying incestuous and pedophile images and scenes. Criticisms had already been made in 2011, and again in 2018, particularly following the publication of his album Petit Paul. Old interviews and social media posts resurfaced, and Vivès was accused of promoting rape culture. The festival mentioned threats and intimidation as the reason for cancelling the exhibit.

== Works ==
Title	Date	Author	Publisher	Notes
Poungi la racaille	2006		Éditions Danger Public	Under the pseudonym Bastien Chanmax
Elle(s)	2007		Editions KSTЯ	
Hollywood Jan	2008	Michaël Sanlaville	Éditions KSTЯ	
A Taste of Chlorine (Le goût du chlore)	2008		Éditions KSTЯ	Official selection of the Angoulême Festival 2009
La boucherie	2008		Editions Warum	
Dans mes yeux	2009		Editions KSTЯ	
Juju Mimi Féfé Chacha	2009	Alexis de Raphelis	Editions Ankama	
Pour l'empire - Tome 1 : L'honneur	2010	Merwan Chabane (writer); Sandra Desmazières (color)	Poisson Pilote collection, Dargaud	
Tranches Napolitaines	2010	With Anne Simon, Alfred and Mathieu Sapin	Dargaud	
Pour l'empire - Tome 2 : Les femmes	2010	Merwan Chabane (writer); Sandra Desmazières (color)	Poisson Pilote collection, Dargaud	
Polina	2011		Éditions KSTЯ	Adapted into the film Polina
Pour l'empire - Tome 3 : La fortune	2011	Merwan Chabane (writer); Sandra Desmazières (color)	Poisson Pilote collection, Dargaud	
Les Autres Gens - Tome 1	04/2011	Collective	Dupuis	
La Famille			Delcourt	
Les Melons de la Colère	2011		Les Requins Marteaux	
L'Amour			Delcourt	
Lastman	2013	With Michael Sanlaville (art) and Balak (writer)	Éditions KSTЯ	Volume #6 won the Angoulême International Comics Festival Prize for a Series in 2015.
Une sœur	2017		Casterman	Adapted into the film Falcon Lake
Attention chien méchant	2017		Casterman	
La décharge mentale	2018		Les Requins Marteaux	
The Blouse (Le chemisier)	2018		Casterman	
Petit Paul	2018		Glénat	
Le Football	2019		Delcourt	
Quatorze juillet	2020	With Martin Quenehen (writer)	Casterman	
Les Cahiers Aire libre, t.5 : Pendant ce temps à Fécamp	2020	With Blutch and Catel Muller		
A Sister	2021		Ablaze	
Dernier Weekend de Janvier	2022		Casterman	

== Adaptations ==
- 2016: Polina (Polina, danser sa vie)
- 2016: Lastman
- 2022: Falcon Lake
- 2023: Wingwomen (Voleuses)
