= Weinersmith =

Weinersmith is a surname. Notable people with the surname include:

- Kelly Weinersmith, American biologist
- Zach Weinersmith (born 1982), American cartoonist and writer
