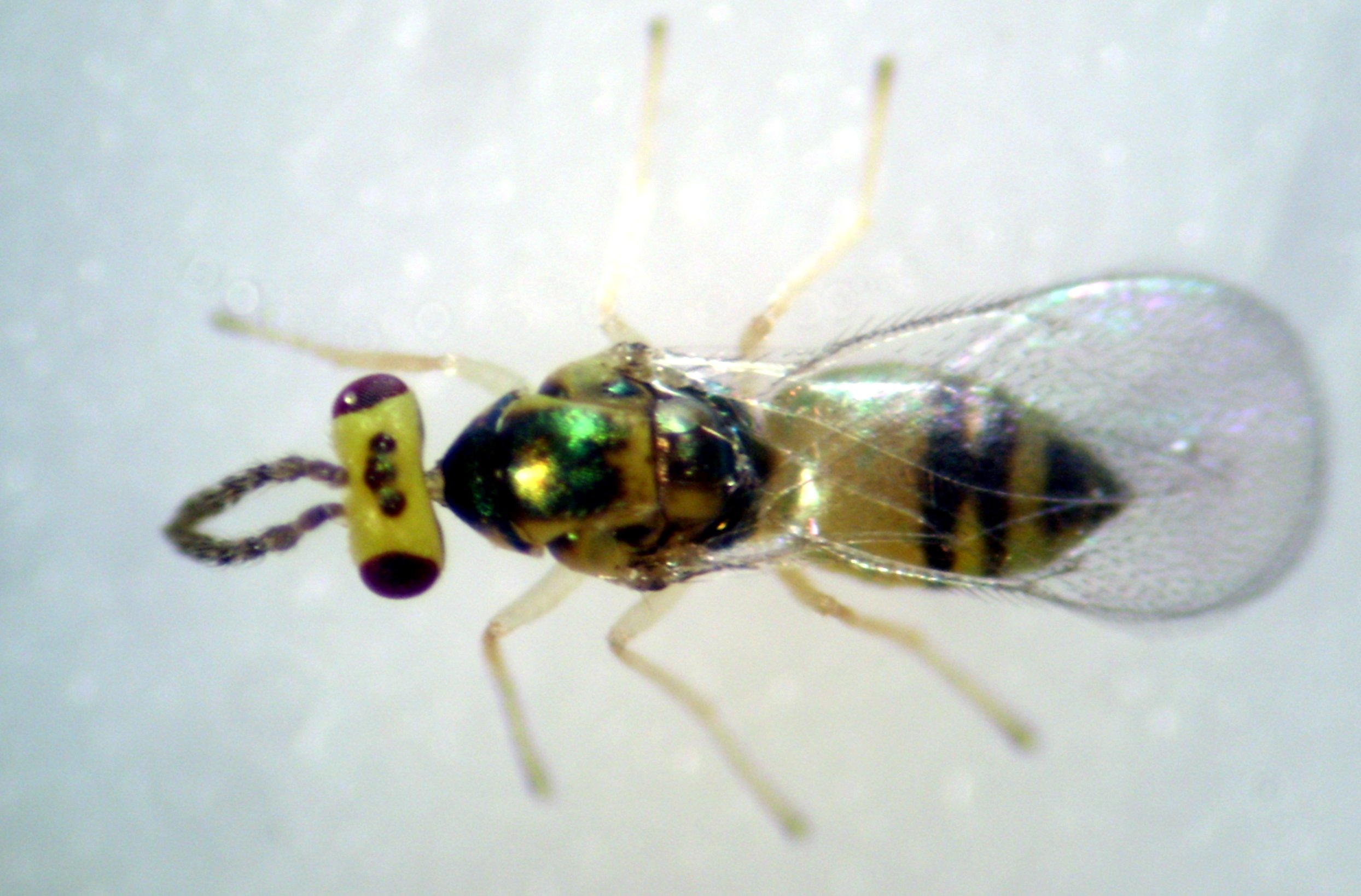
- Minotetrastichus frontalis

Scientific classification
- Kingdom: Animalia
- Phylum: Arthropoda
- Class: Insecta
- Order: Hymenoptera
- Family: Eulophidae
- Subfamily: Tetrastichinae
- Genus: Minotetrastichus; Kostjukov, 1977

Type species
- Cirrospilus ecus original designation (Walker, 1839)

Species
- Minotetrastichus citriscapus (Kostjukov, 1978); Minotetrastichus curtiventris (Kostjukov, 1978); Minotetrastichus frontalis (Nees, 1834); Minotetrastichus loxotoma (Graham, 1961); Minotetrastichus napomyzae (Domenichini, 1965); Minotetrastichus pallidocinctus (Gahan, 1932); Minotetrastichus platanellus (Mercet, 1922); Minotetrastichus prolongatus Graham, 1987; Minotetrastichus treron Graham, 1987; Minotetrastichus zeasmi Narendran, 2009

= Minotetrastichus =

Genus of wasps

Minotetrastichus is a genus of hymenopteran insects of the family Eulophidae. They are parasites of leaf-mining Lepidoptera, Coleoptera, and Hymenoptera.
