= Bryan Caplan =

American behavioral economist and author (born 1971)

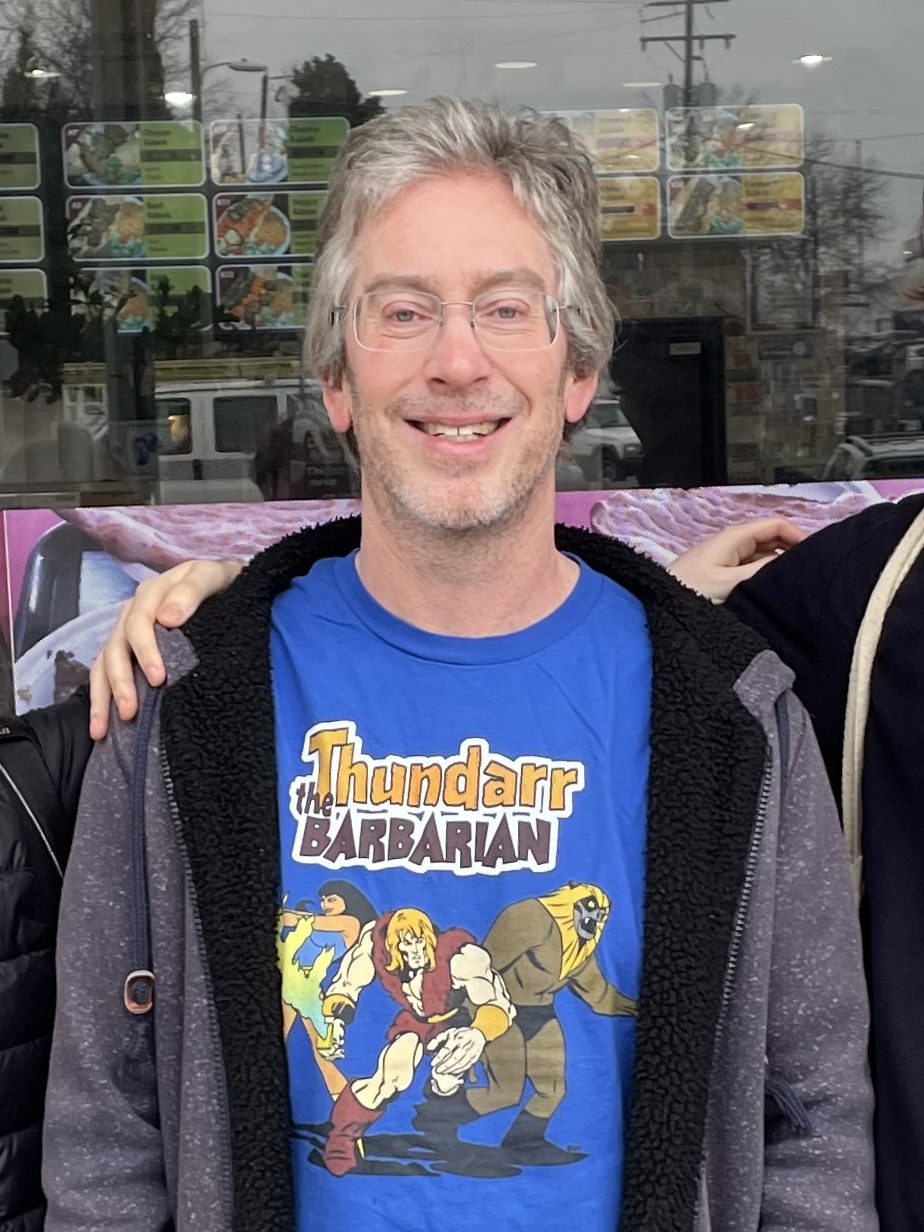
- Caplan in 2024
- Born: Bryan Douglas Caplan; April 8, 1971 (age 55); Los Angeles, California, U.S.

Academic background
- Education: University of California, Berkeley (BA); Princeton University (PhD)
- Influences: Ben Bernanke, James M. Buchanan, Michael Huemer, Ludwig von Mises, Philip Tetlock

Academic work
- Discipline: Economics
- School or tradition: Anarcho-capitalism; Libertarianism; Public choice
- Notable ideas: Rational irrationality
- Website: bcaplan.com; Information at IDEAS / RePEc

Bryan Douglas Caplan (born April 8, 1971) is an American economist and author. He is a professor of economics at George Mason University, a senior research fellow at the Mercatus Center, an adjunct scholar at the Cato Institute, and a former contributor to the Freakonomics blog. He currently publishes his own blog, Bet on It. Caplan is a self-described "economic libertarian". The bulk of Caplan's academic work is in behavioral economics and public economics, especially public choice theory.

== Early life and education ==
Bryan Douglas Caplan was born on April 8, 1971, to a Jewish father and a Catholic mother, in Northridge, California, on April 8, 1971. He obtained a B.A. in economics from the University of California, Berkeley in 1993 and a Ph.D. in economics from Princeton University in 1997.

== Career ==
=== The Myth of the Rational Voter ===
The Myth of the Rational Voter: Why Democracies Choose Bad Policies, published in 2007, further develops the "rational irrationality" concept from Caplan's earlier academic writing. It draws heavily from the Survey of Americans and Economists on the Economy in making the argument that voters have systematically biased beliefs about many important economic topics. Caplan writes that rational irrationality is an explanation for the failure of democracy. The book was reviewed in the popular press, including The Wall Street Journal, The New York Times, and The New Yorker, as well as in academic publications such as the Journal of Libertarian Studies, Public Choice, Libertarian Papers, and The Independent Review. It received a disparaging critique by Rupert Read in the European Review.

=== Selfish Reasons to Have More Kids ===
In 2011, Caplan published his second book, Selfish Reasons to Have More Kids, arguing that people often work too hard in child-rearing, and as a result fear having children. The book urges parents to relax about child-rearing. It argues that as the perceived costs (in terms of child-rearing expense and effort) of having children fell, it makes sense to have more children based on the basic theory of supply and demand. The book was reviewed in The Wall Street Journal, The Guardian, RealClearMarkets, and The Washington Times. It also led to debates sponsored by The Wall Street Journal and The Guardian. The Guardian had Caplan debating "Tiger Mom" Amy Chua on the merits of strict parenting. The book was also featured in a story on National Public Radio. Kirkus Reviews called it "inconsistent and unpersuasive."

=== "The Ideological Turing Test" ===
In a June 2011 blog post titled "The Ideological Turing Test" contesting Paul Krugman's claim that political liberals can accurately state conservatives' views but not vice versa, Caplan proposed a test analogous to a kind of Turing test: instead of judging whether a chatbot had accurately imitated a person, the test would judge whether a person had accurately stated the views of ideological opponents to the opponents' satisfaction. Other writers have since said of someone that they can (or can't) "pass an ideological Turing test" if they are deemed to be capable (or incapable) of understanding and accurately stating an adversary's arguments.

=== The Case Against Education ===
The Case Against Education: Why the Education System Is a Waste of Time and Money was published in 2018 by Princeton University Press. Drawing on the economic concept of job market signaling and research in educational psychology, the book argues that much of higher education is very inefficient and has only a small effect in improving human capital, contrary to much of the conventional consensus in labor economics that Caplan claims takes the human capital theory for granted.

=== Open Borders: The Science and Ethics of Immigration ===
Caplan and Saturday Morning Breakfast Cereal cartoonist Zach Weinersmith created the graphic non-fiction book Open Borders: the Science and Ethics of Immigration, which was released on October 29, 2019.

Tyler Cowen called it "a landmark in economic education, how to present economic ideas, and the integration of economic analysis and graphic visuals." The Economist praised it as "a model of respectful, persuasive argument". Kevin D. Williamson, writing in National Review, concluded a review of the book with "Professor Caplan's argument is multifaceted, energetically presented, fun to read, and worth giving some real attention to if only as an exercise in clarifying one's own thinking about the question". Williamson said that the book was well presented but that Caplan did not address some obvious counterarguments against open borders and suggested that he oversimplified the issue.

=== Labor Econ Versus the World ===
In 2022, Caplan published Labor Econ Versus the World: Essays on the World's Greatest Market, a collection of his essays from the publication EconLog edited by Jack Pfefferkorn. In it, Caplan argues against minimum wage laws, immigration bans, government spending on education, and Keynesianism.

Tyler Cowen wrote a reaction to the book, stating that his disagreement with Caplan is "that most of the inequity occurs upstream of labor markets, through the medium of culture."

== Views ==
Caplan was cited as one of the leading proponents of the open borders position in articles in The Atlantic and Vox. He has also been quoted on the topic of immigration in outlets such as the Huffington Post and Time magazine.

Caplan's anarcho-capitalist views were discussed by Brian Doherty in his book Radicals for Capitalism and in Reason magazine. Caplan has argued that anarcho-capitalists have a better claim on the history of anarchist thought than "mainstream anarchists", or "left-anarchists", as he refers to them. Other anarchists dispute the authority of this argument.

== Personal life ==
Caplan is married to Corina Caplan, with four children, and resides in Oakton, Virginia.

== Bibliography ==
Popular books

- 2007 The Myth of the Rational Voter: Why Democracies Choose Bad Policies, ISBN 978-0-691-13873-2
- 2012 Selfish Reasons to Have More Kids, ISBN 978-0-465-02861-0
- 2018 The Case Against Education: Why the Education System Is a Waste of Time and Money, ISBN 978-0-691-19645-9

Essay collections

- 2022 Labor Econ Versus the World: Essays on the World's Greatest Market, ISBN 979-8-785-87286-8
- 2022 How Evil Are Politicians?: Essays on Demagoguery, ISBN 979-8-804-04960-8
- 2022 Don't Be a Feminist: Essays on Genuine Justice, ISBN 979-8-846-16665-3
- 2023 Voters as Mad Scientists: Essays on Political Irrationality, ISBN 979-8-378-72528-1
- 2023 You Will Not Stampede Me: Essays on Non-Conformism, ISBN 979-8-863-99804-6
- 2024 Self-Help Is Like a Vaccine: Essays on Living Better, ISBN 979-8-337-85018-4
- 2025 Pro-Market AND Pro-Business: Essays on Laissez-Faire, ISBN 979-8-310-48263-0
- 2026 You Have No Right to Your Culture: Essays on the Human Condition, ISBN 979-8-276-26651-0

Graphic books

- 2019 Open Borders: the Science and Ethics of Immigration (illustrations by Zach Weinersmith), ISBN 978-1-250-31696-7
- 2024 Build, Baby, Build: The Science and Ethics of Housing Regulation (illustrations by Ady Branzei), ISBN 978-1-952-22341-9
