= Parasecodes =

Scientific classification
- Kingdom: Animalia
- Phylum: Arthropoda
- Clade: Pancrustacea
- Class: Insecta
- Order: Hymenoptera
- Family: Eulophidae
- Subfamily: Entiinae
- Genus: Parasecodes; Mercet, 1924

Type species
- Parasecodes simulans Mercet, 1924

Species
- Parasecodes longigaster Efremova and Shroll, 1996; Parasecodes simulans Mercet, 1924

Genus of wasps

Parasecodes is a genus of hymenopteran insects of the family Eulophidae.
