= Entiinae =

Scientific classification
- Domain: Eukaryota
- Kingdom: Animalia
- Phylum: Arthropoda
- Class: Insecta
- Order: Hymenoptera
- Family: Eulophidae
- Subfamily: Entiinae; Hedqvist, 1974

Genera
- Acrias Walker, 1847; Allocerastichus Masi, 1924; Aoridus Yoshimoto, 1971; Arabiola Narendran, 2013; Astichus Förster, 1856; Bellerus Walker, 1843; Beornia Hedqvist, 1975; Boucekastichus Andriescu, 1971; Carlyleia Girault, 1916; Euderus Haliday, 1844; Hubbardiella Ashmead, 1904; Opeuderus Boucek, 1988; Parasecodella Girault, 1915; Parasecodes Mercet, 1924; Pseudosecodes Girault and Dodd, 1915; Uroentedon Ashmead, 1904; Wichmannia Ruschka, 1916; Zeastichus Boucek, 1988

Synonyms
- Entiidae Hedqvist, 1974; Euderidae Erdös; Euderinae Erdös, 1956; Euderini Erdös, 1956

Subfamily of wasps

Entiinae is a subfamily of the chalcid wasp family Eulophidae. It was formerly better known as the Euderinae but this name was determined to be a junior homonym. It consists of 18 genera.
