= A City on Mars =

2023 book by Kelly and Zach Weinersmith

- Author: Kelly Weinersmith; Zach Weinersmith
- Language: English
- Genre: Popular science
- Publisher: Penguin Press
- Publication date: November 7, 2023
- Pages: 436
- ISBN: 9781984881724
- Preceded by: Soonish

A City on Mars: Can We Settle Space, Should We Settle Space, and Have We Really Thought This Through? is a 2023 popular science book by Kelly and Zach Weinersmith. It covers the current state of knowledge of space settlement given changes in the economics of space travel in the 2010s and 2020s, with a particular focus on challenges that the authors consider unresolved or underestimated. The book is illustrated with Zach Weinersmith's artwork; he is known as the creator of the webcomic Saturday Morning Breakfast Cereal.

The book discusses challenges facing long-term human existence in space and encourages further research into solving these issues before long-term space settlement is attempted, as the technical barriers to increased space travel appear to be weakening due to advances from commercial space flight providers. Some of the challenges covered in the book include sex in space; pregnancy and childrearing off-Earth; space psychology; the effects of microgravity and deep space radiation on humans; agriculture and biosphere creation outside of Earth; space law; nation-building off-Earth; and the difficulties of supplying colonies. It also weighs the potential benefits from Lunar colonization, Martian colonization, and the construction of space stations against the ease of living on Earth, as even a hypothetically devastated Earth would be more habitable than other options in the Solar System.

Reviews of the book were positive, praising its humor and fresh viewpoint. It made 11th place on The New York Times Best Seller list for hardback nonfiction books. In 2024, the book won the Hugo Award for Best Related Work and the Royal Society Trivedi Science Book Prize.

== Background ==
The book was written by married couple Kelly Weinersmith, an adjunct professor at Rice University in the BioSciences Department, and Zach Weinersmith, a cartoonist known for the webcomic Saturday Morning Breakfast Cereal. The idea behind the book originated while the Weinersmiths were writing the 2017 book Soonish: Ten Emerging Technologies That'll Improve and/or Ruin Everything. The first chapter of Soonish is on cheap access to space, as the costs of raising mass to low-earth orbit using rockets had decreased dramatically from the 20th century. The Weinersmiths researched what the near future of space settlement might be like, inspired by statements from advocates of extraterrestrial colonization like Elon Musk who claimed that Mars colonies would be established in the early 21st century. They originally intended the book to cover topics like selecting a crew for space colonization, but as they researched they found that the challenges facing space colonization were more daunting than they expected, and that many of these challenges were ignored by popular depictions of space travel. In A City on Mars, the two note that the majority of space literature is written by enthusiasts and advocates of space colonization, and compare it to a situation where all the books on beer were written by brewing companies.

The book was published on November 7, 2023, by Penguin Press, a division of Penguin Books. A paperback edition was released on July 29, 2025.

== Contents ==
The authors discuss common reasons proposed for space settlement, most of which they consider to be inadequate. The book argues that the overview effect, said to make astronauts more introspective and insightful, is insignificant or nonexistent, and that historians no longer support the Frontier Thesis that suggests exploring rugged frontiers like the American West creates hardy, productive, democratic citizens. It also argues that the political reasons for the original Space Race, which took place side-by-side with decolonization when the US and USSR competed to impress newly formed countries, are no longer relevant.

The book argues that there are only two viable arguments in favor of space travel, the idea that spreading humanity outside of Earth could improve the species' odds of long-term survival, and the pursuit of space travel as a luxury investment for purely ideological reasons. The book examines current plans for space settlement and their challenges, stating that either argument in favor of space travel requires further technological and social developments. The authors conclude that space settlement is unlikely to improve humanity's survival unless economic self-sufficiency could be achieved, which would require millions of settlers or incredibly advanced hypothetical robotics. They also conclude that space travel as an ideological pursuit would only be moral if it could be made safe, requiring further biological and ecological research to protect humans in space. It would also require aligning spacefaring nations on a new political and legal framework to avoid the risk of starting conflicts in space.

=== Human physiology ===
The book summarizes current knowledge of the health impacts of prolonged exposure to low gravity and cosmic rays on humans, including muscle loss and back pain from the low gravity environment and eye damage from radiation. The longest any human has spent consecutively in orbit is Valeri Polyakov's record of 437 days, and the longest a human has been in deep space exposed to cosmic radiation without the protection of the Earth's magnetosphere was only 12 days, while a one-way trip to Mars with current technology would take six months. Return trips would have strictly limited launch windows due to the need for gravity assists, suggesting that even the fastest Mars missions would be lengthier than prior space stays. The book questions the survivability of such trips and their long-term impacts on the human body, including whether Mars colonists would be safely returned to Earth.

The authors also discuss hypothetical obstacles to long-term human settlement including potential complications of sex in space, pregnancy, and raising children in a low-gravity environment such as Mars or the even lower gravity environment of the Moon. The book speculates that artificial gravity could be used to mitigate these issues, such as by creating a banked racetrack (or "pregnodrome") to constantly accelerate humans downward to Earth-equivalent gravity. However, it notes that such a proposal would be impractical.

=== Nature of proposed settlements ===
An Earth with climate change and nuclear war and, like, zombies and werewolves is still a way better place than Mars. Staying alive on Earth requires fire and a pointy stick. Staying alive in space will require all sorts of high-tech gadgets we can barely manufacture on Earth.

— A City on Mars, Chapter 1

The book discusses the environmental hazards of extraterrestrial settlements and states that, even in the case of a doomsday event, Earth would be more habitable than other environments in the Solar System. It notes that Mars experiences giant dust storms and that Martian soil is tainted by perchlorates. To avoid these hazards, it suggests that human colonies might live underground in small habitats where mechanical accidents would be deadly, and that humans would need to consume alternative food sources like insects and make use of carbon recycling, including human waste reclamation. It notes that the Moon is also extremely difficult to settle, as its surface is covered in regolith and its environment lacks elements essential to human life like carbon and phosphorus. It suggests that giant rotating space stations could simulate Earth's gravity, but would be completely exposed to radiation, and would require immense amounts of mass to build, perhaps requiring materials to be mined from asteroids or the Moon.

Space psychology is also explored, including the need for larger human settlements to be less selective than current space missions which carefully screen crew members. The book questions how average people would adapt to the hardships of space, and how it could be handled if someone became irrational and needed to be safely restrained or have their duties replaced. Similar cases involving settlements in Antarctica and the Biosphere 2 experiment, where eight people lived in a controlled ecosystem for a year, are discussed. The authors note that the Biosphere experiment's cost was tiny compared to the budget of the International Space Station, and suggests that hundreds of similar Biosphere-type experiments could be productively and cheaply run on Earth.

=== Sociology, law, and politics ===
An illustration from the book, portraying a hypothetical Canadian occupation of a peak of eternal light

The book also deals with the ethics of space settlement, including settlements which would deliberately place humans in dangerous situations. Some of the hypothetical scenarios discussed involve survival homicide and cannibalism, such as a situation in which food and air must be preserved by killing off some crew members or settlers. Existing precedents for survival homicides, such as US v. Holmes and R v Dudley and Stephens, are discussed alongside the likelihood that space settlements would operate under the laws of whichever nation's citizens were sent.

The Outer Space Treaty is discussed, and the book suggests the treaty should be updated due to the advent of commercial space exploration in the 21st century. While the authors are skeptical of the economic viability of asteroid mining and other hypothetical methods of resource extraction in space, they suggest that if space did become economically important it might cause space exploration to become less peaceful.

The authors argue that the governance style of space settlements, particularly small ones, would probably shift toward authoritarianism, given the strict control of machinery and mandatory recycling required for survival. While workers can leave an unpleasant company town on Earth, this is less feasible on a hypothetical small Mars settlement, where there may be no other place to go. They also suggest that settlements would require a substantial population, allowing for redundancy if people quit or die or machines break, since replacements could not be quickly sent from Earth. They further postulate that the hypothetical future technology needed to efficiently return resources from the Moon or asteroids to Earth could also be weaponized.

== Reception ==
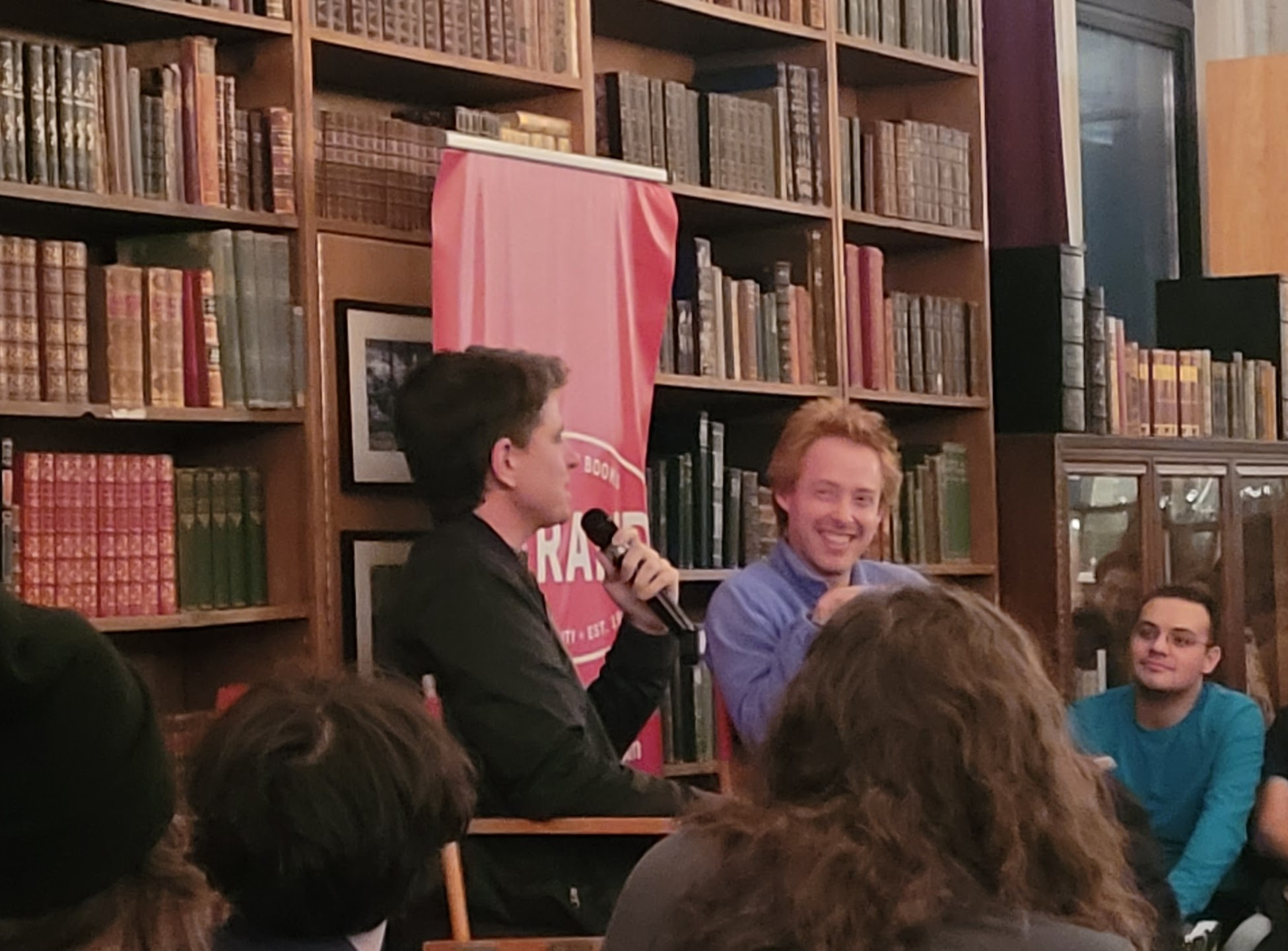
Zach Weinersmith (right) and Randall Munroe (left) at a book tour event for the release of A City on Mars at the Strand Bookstore in New York City

A City on Mars won the 2024 Hugo Award for Best Related Work. It also won the 2024 Royal Society Trivedi Science Book Prize.

Critical reception was positive. W. M. Akers wrote in The New York Times that the book was "exceptional" and "hilarious", praising it as a needed check on expectations of space settlement coming any time soon. Christie Aschwanden in Undark said the book was "deeply researched", informative, and interesting. Kim Kovacs of BookBrowse thought that A City on Mars was deeper than the average pop science book, with its humor helping let laypeople follow along with the cutting edge of space technology. Kirkus Reviews called the book "a romp" with a lot to offer. Chris Lee of Ars Technica praised the book for raising the risks of not taking seriously the political structure of a future space settlement, writing "do you really want to create a group of hungry, disgruntled miners that are also able to sling very large rocks at the Earth?"

A City on Mars made 11th place on The New York Times Best Seller list for hardback nonfiction books. When the paperback edition came out in late July 2025, it made 2nd place in the paperback nonfiction category.
