= Cryptkeeper =

Cryptkeeper or Crypt Keeper may refer to:

- The Crypt-Keeper, a narrator from the comic Tales from the Crypt
- Euderus set, the crypt-keeper wasp
- Crypt Keeper (wrestler), ring name of José Estrada Jr., a Puerto Rican professional wrestler

== See also ==
- The Cryptkeeper Five, an American band
