= Carlyleia =

Scientific classification
- Domain: Eukaryota
- Kingdom: Animalia
- Phylum: Arthropoda
- Class: Insecta
- Order: Hymenoptera
- Family: Eulophidae
- Subfamily: Entiinae
- Genus: Carlyleia; Girault, 1916

Species
- Carlyleia marilandica Girault, 1916

Genus of wasps

Carlyleia is a genus of hymenopteran insects of the family Eulophidae.
