= Parasecodella =

Scientific classification
- Kingdom: Animalia
- Phylum: Arthropoda
- Class: Insecta
- Order: Hymenoptera
- Family: Eulophidae
- Subfamily: Entiinae
- Genus: Parasecodella; Girault, 1915

Type species
- Parasecodella dickensi Girault, 1915

Species
- Parasecodella bouceki Narendran and Surekha, 1992; Parasecodella dickensi Girault, 1915; Parasecodella nigricorpus (Khan and Shafee, 1985); Parasecodella obscura (Thomson, 1878); Parasecodella pantnagarensis Khan, Agnihotri and Sushil, 2005

Synonyms
- Euderastichus Boucek, 1963

Genus of wasps

Parasecodella is a genus of hymenopteran insects of the family Eulophidae.
