= Beornia =

Scientific classification
- Domain: Eukaryota
- Kingdom: Animalia
- Phylum: Arthropoda
- Class: Insecta
- Order: Hymenoptera
- Family: Eulophidae
- Subfamily: Entiinae
- Genus: Beornia; Hedqvist, 1975

Type species
- Beornia femorata Hedqvist, 1975

Species
- Beornia brevigaster Boucek, 1988; Beornia femorata Hedqvist, 1975

Genus of wasps

Beornia is a genus of hymenopteran insects of the family Eulophidae.
