= Uroentedon =

Scientific classification
- Kingdom: Animalia
- Phylum: Arthropoda
- Class: Insecta
- Order: Hymenoptera
- Family: Eulophidae
- Subfamily: Entiinae
- Genus: Uroentedon; Ashmead, 1904

Species
- Uroentedon verticillatus Ashmead, 1904

Genus of wasps

Uroentedon is a genus of hymenopteran insects of the family Eulophidae.
