= Zeastichus =

Scientific classification
- Kingdom: Animalia
- Phylum: Arthropoda
- Class: Insecta
- Order: Hymenoptera
- Family: Eulophidae
- Subfamily: Entiinae
- Genus: Zeastichus; Boucek, 1988

Species
- Zeastichus asper Boucek, 1988

Genus of wasps

Zeastichus is a genus of hymenopteran insects of the family Eulophidae.
