= Soonish =

2017 book by Kelly and Zach Weinersmith

- Author: Kelly Weinersmith; Zach Weinersmith
- Illustrator: Zach Weinersmith
- Language: English
- Genre: Popular science
- Publisher: Penguin Press
- Publication date: October 17, 2017
- Publication place: United States
- Pages: 368
- ISBN: 978-0-399-56382-9
- Followed by: A City on Mars

Soonish (Note: Full title Soonish: Ten Emerging Technologies That'll Improve and/or Ruin Everything) is a 2017 non-fiction graphic novel by American biologist Kelly Weinersmith and author–cartoonist Zach Weinersmith, published by Penguin Press. It covers ten areas of scientific interest, ranging from outer space to human biology, explaining what research is being done in each area and what its potential impacts are. Chapters are generally humorous in tone and illustrated by Zach, the author of the webcomic Saturday Morning Breakfast Cereal. It received generally positive reviews from critics and was followed up in 2023 by A City on Mars, a similarly illustrated book on space settlement.

== Contents ==
Soonish covers ten subjects that the authors viewed as being emerging technologies with real progress that could be made within a lifetime. The book is divided into three general sections, entitled "The Universe, Soonish", "Stuff, Soonish", and "You, Soonish", going from advancements in outer space to improvements made to things on earth, and then modifications that could be made to the human body itself. Most chapters also include a nota bene with an unusual anecdote related to something within the chapter, even if tangential. Each chapter includes multiple comics that serve as illustrations, either of related jokes or to illustrate the relevant concepts.

The first section begins with "Cheap Access to Space", and discusses several methods that could make travel to space more affordable. This includes technologies such as reusable rockets, air-powered rockets and spaceplanes, "superguns", space elevators, and more, such as ways of optimizing current methods. The nota bene covers the 1990 Supergun affair that led to Gerald Bull allegedly being assassinated by Mossad. The next chapter, "Asteroid Mining", describes many of the problems that make it unfeasible to currently attempt mining in space, in terms of the technical, logistical, and operational challenges, as well as the lack of current economic justification compared to expanded mining operations on earth.

The next section begins with "Fusion Power", which explains how the process works and the research that is being done into making it viable for power generation. This includes the work being done by the National Ignition Facility, Sandia Labs' MagLIF, and ITER, along with other smaller projects. After that is "Programmable Matter", which includes subjects such as materials that change shape when exposed to water and "origami robots", which can fold themselves into functional shapes. Similarly it also covers swarms of nanobots that can be used do tasks or create materials on demand. Next is "Robotic Construction", following advances in automatic construction robots (including swarms of nanobots) and 3D-printed housing. Following that, "Augmented Reality" deals with the implementations of augmented reality devices and how their use could be expanded, and what is preventing them from being used more now (such as a noted tendency for people to express a desire to punch Google Glass wearers in the face), as well as privacy concerns. Finally, "Synthetic Biology" covers how modified DNA in non-human living things could be used, including medical purposes, even up to organ transplants from non-human sources, as well as uses such as in the creation of biofuel.

The final section begins with "Precision Medicine", which includes directly altering the DNA of human beings potentially, unlike the synthetic biology chapter, largely in the context of the treatment of cancer and genetic disorders. It also covers ways to more accurately monitor and report on one's health, and the privacy and financial issues that could ensue. Next is "Bioprinting", about the creation of synthetic organs for transplantation into humans. The nota bene and part of the conclusion discuss the logistics of organ markets and organ-matching markets. The final chapter is "Brain-Computer Interfaces", summarizing the current capabilities of devices to read the brain and the brain to control external devices, with increasing severity of invasiveness. It also covers the ability to modify the brain's functionality and writing into the brain.

There is also a conclusion, subtitled "Less Soonisher, or The Graveyard of Lost Chapters", which details content that was cut from the book either because they could not write enough to justify a full chapter, were too similar to other chapters, or had doubts about how likely the adoption of the technology actually was. This included quantum computing, which they say was the chapter they had spent the most time on of any in the book.

== Background ==
Zach Weinersmith, the author of the webcomic Saturday Morning Breakfast Cereal, started working on Soonish with his wife Kelly in 2015 after meeting a literary agent who was interested in pitching a book by him. They initially planned to include 50 technologies, but eventually reduced that all the way down to 10 for the sake of the book's length without depth being compromised; additionally, the earlier drafts were more oriented towards teenagers who might be interested in working in the field. A completed chapter on "Advanced Nuclear Power" was removed from the final release as well due to size limitations, and later released online for free.

The Weinersmiths did report receiving some negative feedback from a minority of those interviewed for the book, often for how their ideas were presented more than the humor that Soonish used.

=== Publication history ===
Soonish was first published as an ebook and in hardcover by Penguin Press on October 17, 2017, and in paperback on June 4, 2019.

== Reception ==
Soonish received generally positive reviews from critics. It received starred reviews from Publishers Weekly and Booklist, and was also included in Booklist's "Top 10 Sci-Tech Books" for 2017 and received an editor's choice award for books for young adults. It was frequently praised for its combination of humor, both in the book's text and in the comics used as illustration, while not letting that take away from seriously discussing the topics presented, and for providing a balanced look at future technologies instead of leaning into blind optimism or cynicism.

Although still positive on the work overall for its humor, education, and quality of research, Ars Technica reviewer Chris Lee considered the comics to be distracting, although funny, and chapters to be somewhat lacking in depth. Several other reviewers considered the humor and writing to be excessive at times. Although considering it to be "resolutely American in style", Dominic Lenton of Engineering & Technology wrote that Soonish avoided being "grating" thanks to a light touch of applied humor. Science's Colin McCormick praised the humor and breadth of topics covered within the same book, but considered the "how it could change the world" sections towards the end of chapter to often be unfeasible.

Soonish was a New York Times best seller for "Science" in the month after it was released, and spent one week on the general hardcover and combined print/ebook non-fiction lists.
