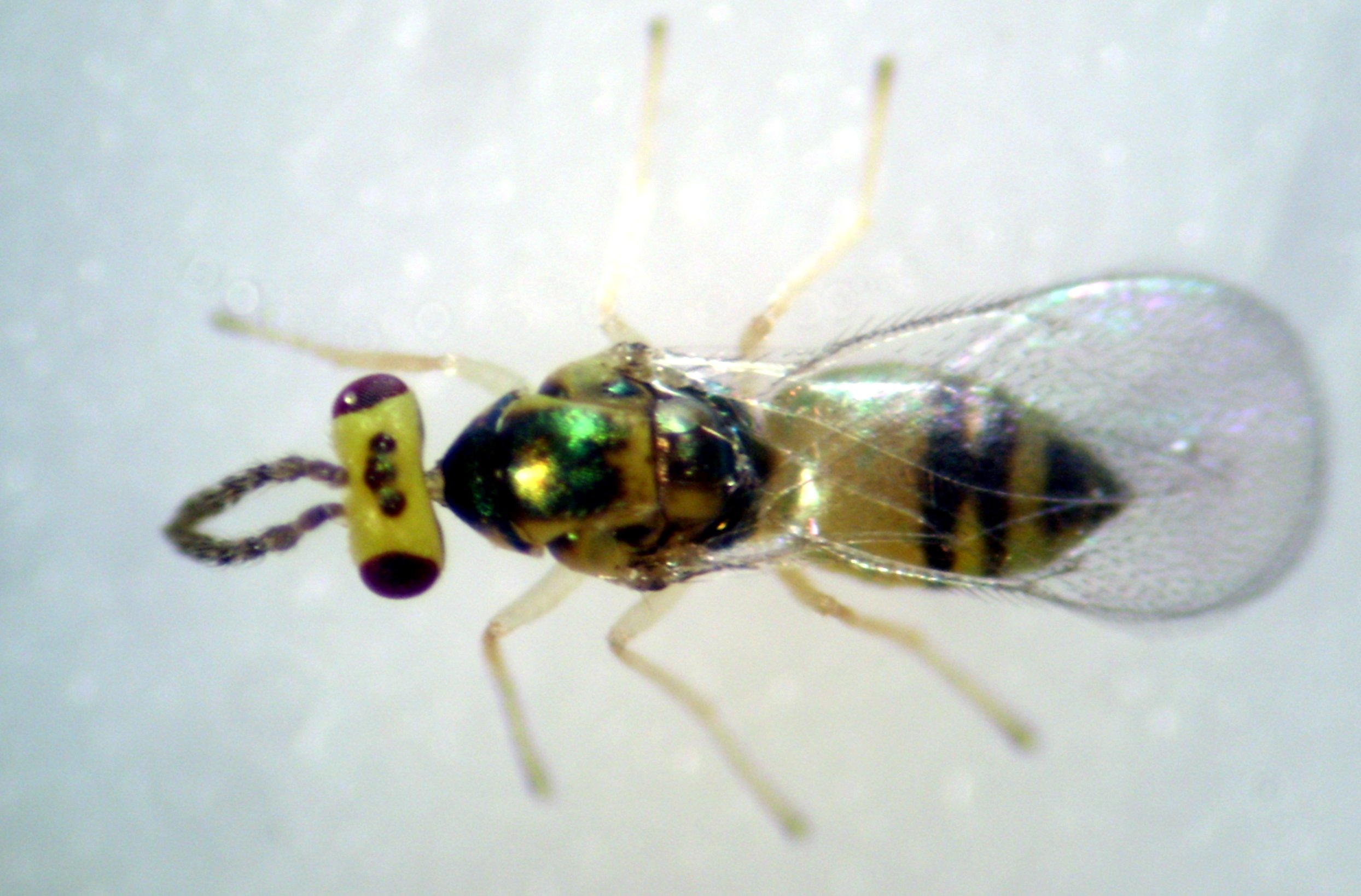

Scientific classification
- Domain: Eukaryota
- Kingdom: Animalia
- Phylum: Arthropoda
- Class: Insecta
- Order: Hymenoptera
- Family: Eulophidae
- Genus: Minotetrastichus
- Species: M. frontalis

Binomial name
- Minotetrastichus frontalis (Nees, 1834)

= Minotetrastichus frontalis =

Species of wasp

Minotetrastichus frontalis is a species of chalcid wasp in the family Eulophidae. It is a parasitoid of Phyllonorycter moths, with larvae capable of feeding on both larval and pupal stages of the moth. M. frontalis has four larval stages and three molts, with development lasting eleven days.
