= Wichmannia =

Scientific classification
- Kingdom: Animalia
- Phylum: Arthropoda
- Class: Insecta
- Order: Hymenoptera
- Family: Eulophidae
- Subfamily: Entiinae
- Genus: Wichmannia; Ruschka, 1916

Type species
- Wichmannia decorata Ruschka, 1916

Species
- Wichmannia decorata Ruschka, 1916; Wichmannia pictipennis Boucek, 1972

Genus of wasps

Wichmannia is a genus of hymenopteran insects of the family Eulophidae.
