= Arabiola =

Scientific classification
- Domain: Eukaryota
- Kingdom: Animalia
- Phylum: Arthropoda
- Class: Insecta
- Order: Hymenoptera
- Family: Eulophidae
- Subfamily: Entiinae
- Genus: Arabiola; Boucek, 1988

Species
- Arabiola bouceki Narendran, 2013

Genus of wasps

Arabiola is a genus of hymenopteran insects of the family Eulophidae. The genus is named after the country the wasp was first discovered in, Saudi Arabia.
