= Aoridus =

Scientific classification
- Domain: Eukaryota
- Kingdom: Animalia
- Phylum: Arthropoda
- Class: Insecta
- Order: Hymenoptera
- Family: Eulophidae
- Subfamily: Entiinae
- Genus: Aoridus; Yoshimoto, 1971

Type species
- Aoridus campbelli Yoshimoto, 1971

Species
- Aoridus campbelli Yoshimoto, 1971; Aoridus scaposus Boucek, 1988

Genus of wasps

Aoridus is a genus of hymenopteran insects of the family Eulophidae.
