= Opeuderus =

Scientific classification
- Kingdom: Animalia
- Phylum: Arthropoda
- Class: Insecta
- Order: Hymenoptera
- Family: Eulophidae
- Subfamily: Entiinae
- Genus: Opeuderus; Boucek, 1988

Species
- Opeuderus conops Boucek, 1988

Genus of wasps

Opeuderus is a genus of hymenopteran insects of the family Eulophidae.
