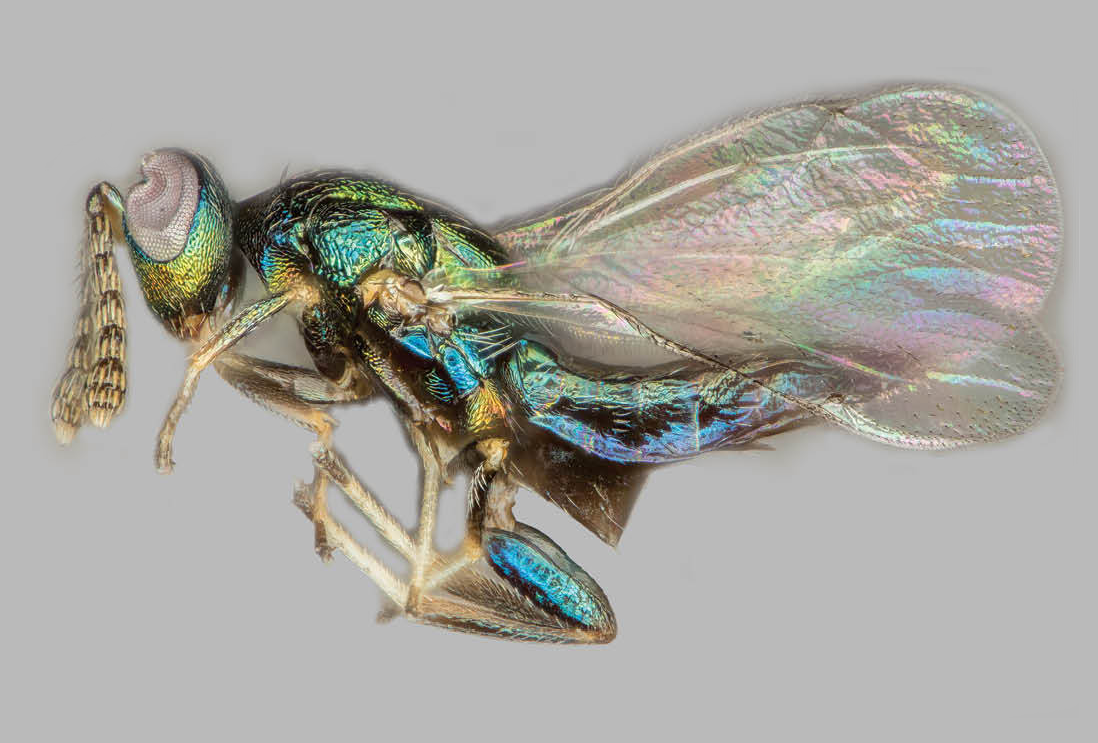
- female Euderus set

Scientific classification
- Kingdom: Animalia
- Phylum: Arthropoda
- Clade: Pancrustacea
- Class: Insecta
- Order: Hymenoptera
- Family: Eulophidae
- Subfamily: Entiinae
- Genus: Euderus; Haliday, 1844

Type species
- Euderus albitarsis (Zetterstedt, 1838)

Species
- 72 species

= Euderus =

Genus of wasps

Euderus is a genus of hymenopteran insects of the family Eulophidae. The genus has a cosmopolitan distribution. All species in the genus are parasitoids, using a variety of hosts across Lepidoptera, Hymenoptera, and Coleoptera. As of 2021, there are 80 described species in the genus.
