= Boulet (comics) =

French comic book creator and cartoonist

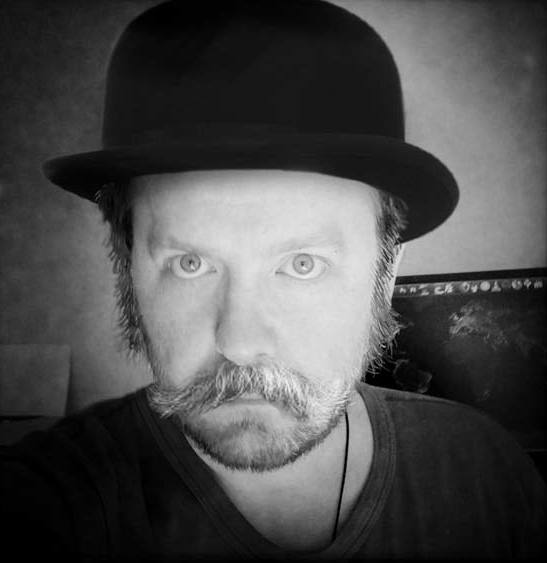
- Gilles Roussel in 2010
- Born: Gilles Roussel; 1 February 1975 (age 51) Meaux, France
- Areas: Cartoonist, Writer, Artist
- Pseudonym: Boulet
- Notable works: Donjon Zénith, Bea Wolf

Boulet, the pen name for Gilles Roussel (French pronunciation: [bulɛ]), is a French comic book creator and cartoonist born 1 February 1975 in Meaux, France. He was among the first French cartoonists to become famous by publishing a blog BD, starting in July 2004.

== Biography ==
Roussel studied art at the Graduate School of Decorative Arts in Strasbourg. In 2001, he published his first comic strip, Raghnarok. He then started a cartoon blog on the internet in July 2004, which made him well known in France. Since then, he has worked for French comics strip magazine Tchô ! and Psikopat, and on many others as an author or cartoonist. He replaced Lewis Trondheim as cartoonist of the comic strip Donjon Zénith.

The popularity of his blog allowed him to become the first "Godfather" of the newly created Paris Comic Strip Blog Festival (Festival des blogs BD), in 2005.

The drawings from his blog were first published in 2008, entitled "Notes". Eleven volumes have been published as of November 2021.

Roussel participated in the French-speaking 24-hour comics day in Montreal in 2008.

He started an English version of his blog in November 2009, where he republished all of his posts from the French blog from its start in 2004 in chronological order, at the rate of three posts per week.

In 2017, Boulet started a collaboration with the publisher Delcourt in order to produce Project Octopus, a collection of scientific comic books evoking subjects as diverse as the exploration of Mars to philosophy. Four to five books a year are planned to be released under this project. These books are written and drawn by artists such as Florence Porcel, Erwann Surcouf, and Héloïse Chochois, but are edited by Boulet.

== Bibliography ==
- Raghnarok, published by Glénat
1. Dragon Junior, published by Glénat, 2001 ISBN 2-7234-3416-8
2. Fées et gestes, 2002 ISBN 2-7234-3695-0
3. Terreurs de la nature, 2003 ISBN 2-7234-4199-7
4. Légendes urbaines, 2005 ISBN 2-7234-4679-4
5. Tempus fugit, 2007 ISBN 978-2-7234-5404-9
6. Casus Belli, 2009 ISBN 978-2-7234-6309-6
- La Rubrique Scientifique, published by Glénat
1. Tome 1, 2002 ISBN 2-7234-4006-0
2. Tome 2, 2004 ISBN 2-7234-4200-4
3. Tome 3, 2005 ISBN 2-7234-5094-5
- Womoks, with Reno, published by Glénat
1. Mutant suspends ton vol !, 2001 ISBN 2-7234-3570-9
2. Le Croiseur s'amuse, 2002 ISBN 2-7234-3776-0
3. Albon, les brutes et les truands, 2004 ISBN 2-7234-4202-0
- Le vœu de... (script), with Lucie Albon (drawing), published by La boîte à bulles
1. Le vœu de Marc with Nicolas Wild, 2005 ISBN 2-84953-028-X
2. Le vœu de Simon with Lucie Albon, 2007 ISBN 978-2-84953-042-9
- Le Miya with Reno and Libon, published by Glénat, 2005 ISBN 2-7234-5206-9
- Donjon Zénith, (cartoonist) with Lewis Trondheim, Joann Sfar (co-authors) and Lucie Albon (color), published by Delcourt
  - 5. Un mariage à part, 2006 ISBN 2-84055-734-7
  - 6. Retour en fanfare, 2007 ISBN 978-2-7560-0596-6
  - 7. Hors des remparts, 2020
- Jour de neige in Boule de neige with Lewis Trondheim, Mathieu Sapin and Lisa Mandel published by Delcourt, 2007
- Notes, collection Shampooing, published by Delcourt
1. Born to be a larve (July 2004 - July 2005), 2008
2. Le petit théâtre de la rue (July 2005 - July 2006), 2009
3. La viande, c'est la force (July 2006 - July 2007), 2009
4. Songe est Mensonge (July 2007 - July 2008), 2010
5. Quelques minutes avant la fin du monde (July 2008 – July 2009), 2011.
6. Debout mes globules (July 2009 – July 2010), 2011.
7. Formicapunk (July 2010 – July 2011), 2012.
8. Les 24 heures (Angoulême festival 24-hour comic contest), 2013.
9. Peu d'or et moult gueule, (July 2011 – July 2013), 2014.
10. Le Pixel quantique, 2016
11. Un royaume magique, 2018
- Chicou Chicou with Lisa Mandel / Juan, Aude Picault / Claude, Domitille Collarday / Frédé, Erwann Surcouf / Fern and Boulet / Ella, published by Delcourt, 2008
- La page blanche (writer) with Pénélope Bagieu, published by Delcourt, 2013
- Bolchoi Arena (writer), with Aseyn (cartoonist), Delcourt, coll. « Hors Collection » :
1. Caelum incognito, 2018
2. La Somnambule, 2020

=== Other books ===
- Soupir with Laureline Michaut, Erwann Surcouf, Cha, Arthur De Pins, published by Nekomix, 2006
- Nekomix 7 : spécial Cinéma with Erwann Surcouf, Phicil, Drac, Tomatias, Amandine, published by Nekomix, 2008
- Erik le Viking, (cartoonist), author Terry Jones, Fantasy collection, published by Bragelonne, 2008 ISBN 2-35294-234-9
- Zach Weinersmith, Augie and the Green Knight, 2015.
- Neil Gaiman, Par bonheur, le lait, published by Au Diable Vauvert, 2015. ISBN 2846269688
- Pulsions : un spectacle graphique (cartoonist) with Kyan Khojandi and Bruno Muschio, published by éditions Albin Michel, 2019 ISBN 978-2-226-43833-1.
- Le joli Coco est un joli Coco (cartoonist) with Capucine, published by Lapin Éditions, 2020 ISBN 978-2-37754-081-5
- Zach Weinersmith, Bea Wolf, 2023.

== See also ==
- List of cartoonists
