= Bassettia pallida =

Scientific classification
- Kingdom: Animalia
- Phylum: Arthropoda
- Class: Insecta
- Order: Hymenoptera
- Family: Cynipidae
- Genus: Bassettia
- Species: B. pallida

Binomial name
- Bassettia pallida Ashmead, 1896

Species of wasp

Bassettia pallida is a species of gall wasp found in the Southern United States. This species was described by American entomologist William Harris Ashmead in 1896. B. pallida reproduces asexually in galls it induces on oak trees. The parasite Euderus set, a eulophid wasp, has B. pallida as a host and manipulates its behavior.

== Taxonomy ==
William Harris Ashmead described this species in 1896 based on a female specimen in the National Museum of Natural History. The holotype was collected in 1884 in Georgia.

== Distribution ==
This species has been found in the American states of Georgia, Florida, Missouri, Louisiana, and Texas. Its type location is Savannah, Georgia.

== Description ==
=== Adult female ===
The female is 2 mm (0.08 in) long. The antennae have thirteen joints. The head, antennae, thorax and legs are a brownish yellow color, while the posterior tibiae and eyes are dark brown and the abdomen is a polished black. A grooved line goes around the base of the scutellum.

== Biology ==
=== Reproduction ===
The females can reproduce asexually in galls of the oaks Quercus geminata, Quercus virginiana, and Quercus minima. These oak species are all in the Virentes section (or subsection) of Quercus. Galls are formed on the oaks' stem underneath the bark. Mature B. pallida come out of the galls in March or April, coinciding with the production of new leaves on the oak. Sexual reproduction is thought to happen afterwards in galls formed on the midvein of new leaves.

=== Parasites ===
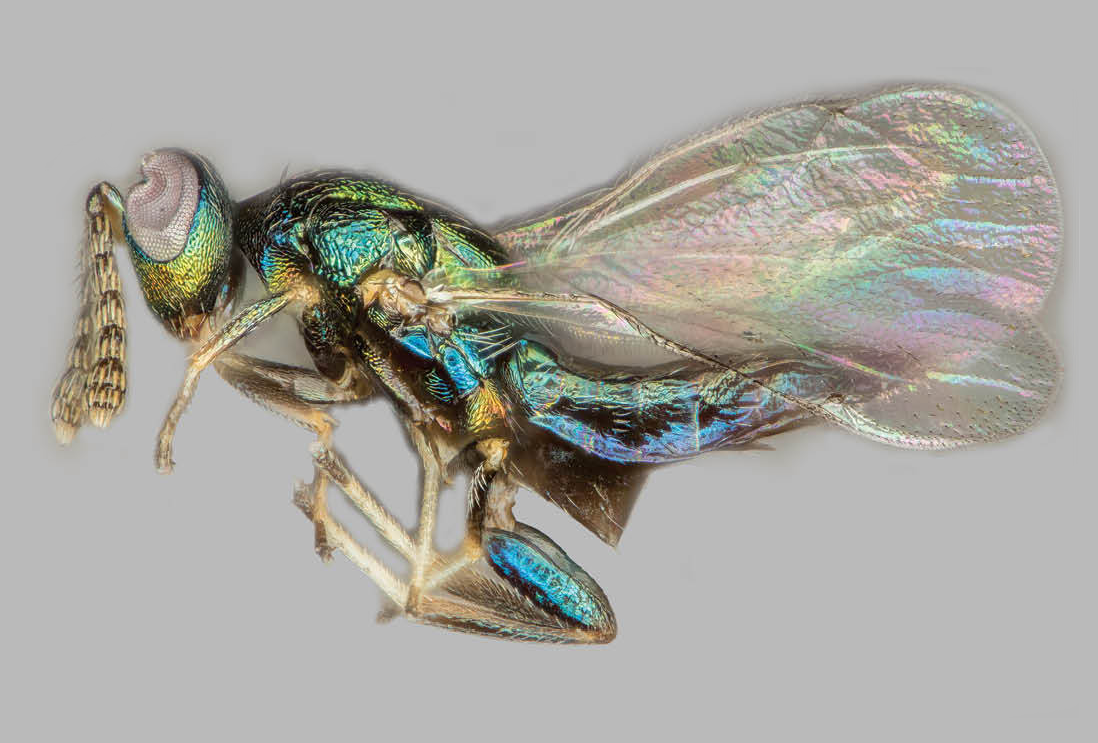
Euderus set

The chalcid wasp Euderus set parasitizes B. pallida. This is a rare example of hypermanipulation, i.e., where one parasite which manipulates its host's phenotype has its own phenotype manipulated by a different parasite. In this case, B. pallida causes the oak to form a gall, and E. set alters the behavior of B. pallida to create a hole in the gall and plug the hole with their head and die; E. set later emerges through a hole in its host's head.

Only the asexual reproductive stage is targeted by E. set.
