= Pseudosecodes =

Scientific classification
- Kingdom: Animalia
- Phylum: Arthropoda
- Class: Insecta
- Order: Hymenoptera
- Family: Eulophidae
- Subfamily: Entiinae
- Genus: Pseudosecodes; Girault and Dodd, 1915

Type species
- Pseudosecodes splendidus Girault, 1915

Species
- Pseudosecodes calicuticus Narendran, 2006; Pseudosecodes malabaricus Narendran, 2006; Pseudosecodes splendidus Girault, 1915

Genus of wasps

Pseudosecodes is a genus of hymenopteran insects of the family Eulophidae.
