= Dungeon (comics) =

Fantasy comic books series

Dungeon (Donjon)
- Created by: Joann Sfar; Lewis Trondheim

Publication information
- Publisher: Delcourt
- Original language: French
- Genre: Comic fantasy; Anthropomorphic
- Publication date: 1998 – Present

Creative team
- Writer(s): Joann Sfar; Lewis Trondheim
- Artist(s): Various

Dungeon (French title: Donjon) is a series of fantasy comic books created by Joann Sfar and Lewis Trondheim, with contributions from numerous other artists. It is originally published in France since 1998 by Delcourt as a series of graphic albums; English editions of a large amount of stories have been released by NBM Publishing between 2002 and 2023 in translations by Joe Johnson, first in a black-and-white periodical version and then as several color graphic novels.

The series is a parody of sword and sorcery conventions in general, and specifically of the role-playing game Dungeons & Dragons. All of the characters are either anthropomorphic animals or other strange creatures. The "dungeon" of the title is, in the original series, a business establishment run by a mild-mannered chicken, where heroes come in search of adventure and treasure and invariably die. The timeline in the main continuity is described as the stages of day; the series that lead up to the dungeon's creation are described in the Potron-Minet (Dawn) segment, the castle's glory days are described as its Zénith (Zenith), and its inevitable decay is described in the Crépuscule (Twilight) stories.

== Sub-series ==
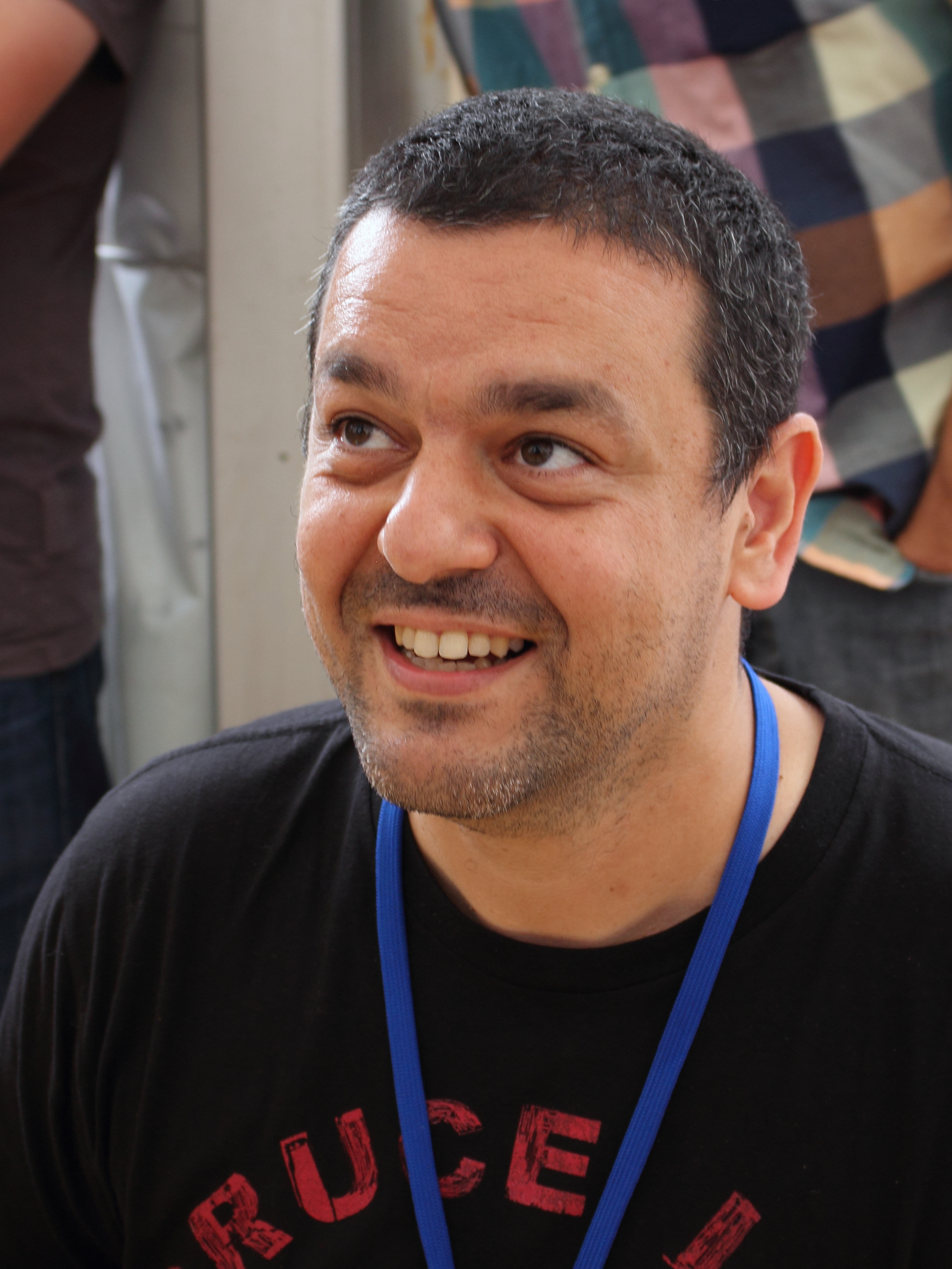
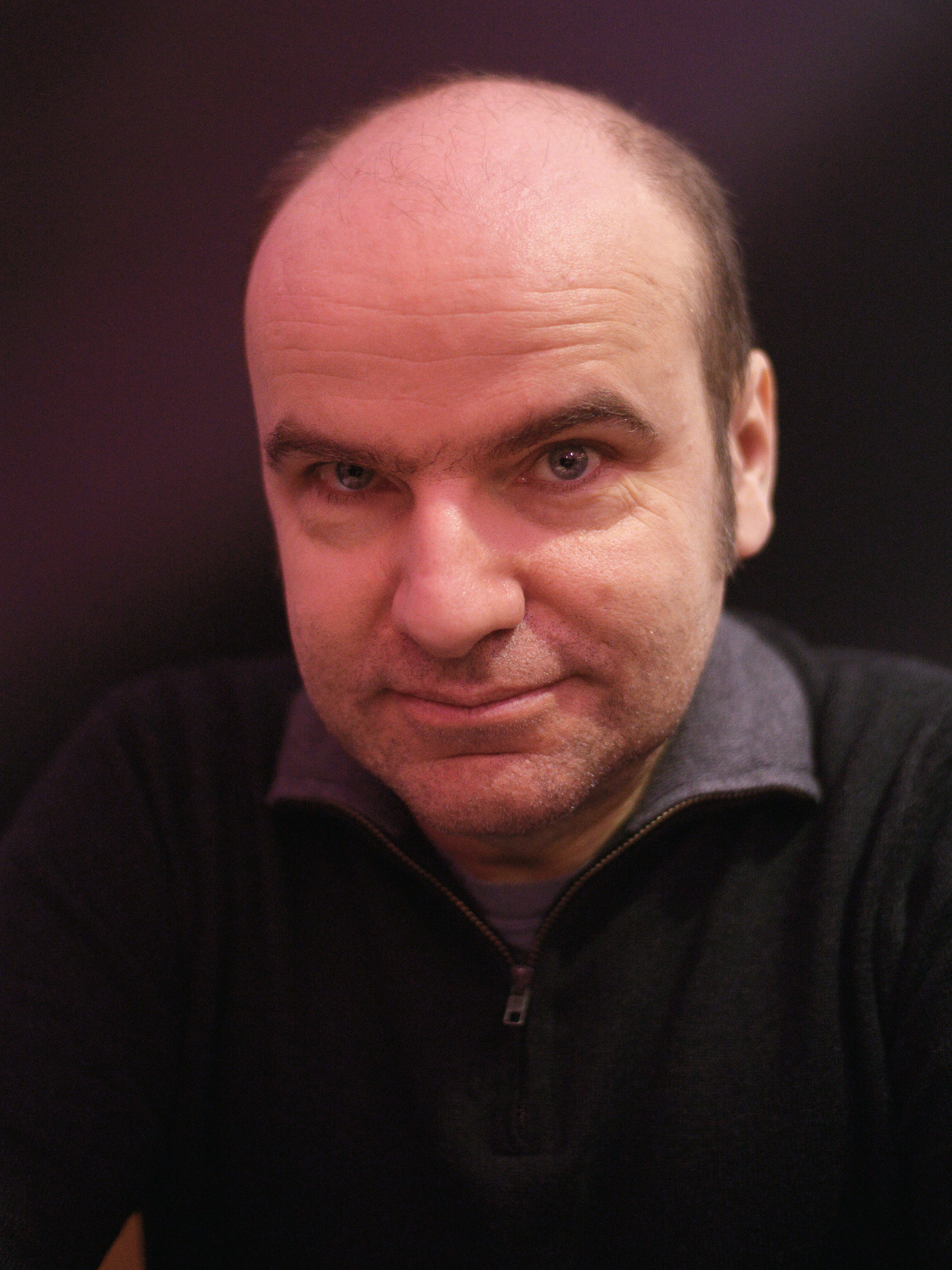
Joann Sfar and Lewis Trondheim, creators and writers of Dungeon.

Dungeon is an extremely ambitious work consisting of several sub-series and various side projects. The Zenith books begin at number 1, while Early Years begins at -99 and Twilight at 101, implying that the authors intended to produce an unprecedented number of books.

=== Early Years ===
Dungeon Early Years (Donjon Potron-Minet, literally Dawn) describes the events leading up to the creation of the titular dungeon, with art by Christophe Blain, Christophe Gaultier and Stéphane Oiry.

=== Zenith ===
Dungeon Zenith (Donjon Zénith) portrays the golden age of the world of Terra Amata . The first four books are drawn by Lewis Trondheim, and from book five onwards by Boulet.

=== Twilight ===
Dungeon Twilight (Donjon Crépuscule) is a darker series where Herbert the Duck has become the dark overlord of the Dungeon, known as The Great Khan. Marvin the dragon, old and blind, teams with Marvin the Red, a brash rabbit warrior. The first three volumes are drawn by Joann Sfar, the others by various artists.

=== Parade ===
Dungeon Parade takes place between volumes 1 and 2 of Dungeon Zenith, starring its protagonists Marvin and Herbert. The artists are Manu Larcenet then various artists.

=== Monstres ===
Dungeon Monstres (Donjon Monsters) features secondary characters from throughout the story. Stories can be set anywhere in the timeline, and feature occasional appearances by the major characters. There is a wide variety of artists in the numerous volumes of this sub-series.

=== Antipodes ===
Two additional series (Donjon Antipodes − and Donjon Antipodes +) explore the distant past and the far future of the other series.

=== Bonus ===
A last sub-series called Donjon Bonus hosts works outside the comics, like the tabletop role-playing game Clefs en Mains

== Bibliography ==
Since the series start, it has grown into quite a large collection of volumes. The place of each book in an orderly timeline is worked out using “levels”. The volume number of books in the main series (Early Years, Zenith, Twilight, Antipodes) is also their level. The Monstres and Parade level numbers are written down in the original books on the first page below the page number.

The following table shows all the French volumes by Delcourt (published since 1998) and information about English-language releases by NBM Publishing (published since 2002 and stopped in 2023). The table can be sorted by series, or by chronological order using “levels”. Unless otherwise noted, all the books are written by Lewis Trondheim and Joann Sfar, with various artists.

Level	Series	French editions		American editions		Artist	Original release date
−99	Early Years	−99	La Chemise de la nuit	1	The Night Shirt; Omnibus: The Night Shirt	Christophe Blain	November 1999
−98	Early Years	−98	Un justicier dans l'ennui	1	The Night Shirt; Omnibus: The Night Shirt	Christophe Blain	April 2001
−97	Early Years	−97	Une jeunesse qui s'enfuit	2	Innocence lost Omnibus: The Night Shirt	Christophe Blain	May 2003
−84	Early Years	−84	Après la pluie	2	Innocence lost Omnibus: The Night Shirt	Christophe Blain	May 2006
−83	Early Years	−83	Sans un bruit	3	Without a Sound	Christophe Gaultier	September 2008
−82	Early Years	−82	Survivre aujourd'hui	3	Without a Sound	Stéphane Oiry	March 2022
1	Zenith	1	Cœur de canard	1	Duck Heart; Omnibus: The Barbarian Princess	Lewis Trondheim	March 1998
2	Zenith	2	Le Roi de la bagarre	1	Duck Heart; Omnibus: The Barbarian Princess	Lewis Trondheim	October 1998
3	Zenith	3	La Princesse des barbares	2	The Barbarian Princess; Omnibus: The Barbarian Princess	Lewis Trondheim	February 2000
4	Zenith	4	Sortilège et Avatar	2	The Barbarian Princess; Omnibus: The Barbarian Princess	Lewis Trondheim	February 2002
5	Zenith	5	Un mariage à part	3	Back in Style	Boulet	June 2006
6	Zenith	6	Retour en fanfare	3	Back in Style	Boulet	November 2007
7	Zenith	7	Hors des remparts	4	Outside the Ramparts	Boulet	January 2020
8	Zenith	8	En sa mémoire	4	Outside the Ramparts	Boulet	November 2020
9	Zenith	9	Larmes et brouillard	5	Fog & Tears	Boulet	November 2022
10	Zenith	10	Formule incantatoire	5	Fog & Tears	Boulet	April 2023
11	Zenith	11	Les Méandres du pouvoir	—	—	Boulet	January 2026
101	Twilight	101	Le Cimetière des dragons	1	Dragon Cemetery; Omnibus: Cemetery of the Dragon	Joann Sfar	April 1999
102	Twilight	102	Le Volcan des Vaucanson	1	Dragon Cemetery; Omnibus: Cemetery of the Dragon	Joann Sfar	March 2001
103	Twilight	103	Armaggedon	2	Armageddon; Omnibus: Cemetery of the Dragon	Joann Sfar	August 2002
104	Twilight	104	Le Dojo du lagon	2	Armageddon; Omnibus: Cemetery of the Dragon	Kerascoët	June 2005
105	Twilight	105	Les Nouveaux Centurions	3	The New Centurions	Kerascoët	October 2006
106	Twilight	106	Révolutions	3	The New Centurions	Obion	June 2009
110	Twilight	110	Haut Septentrion	4	The End of Dungeon	Alfred	March 2014
111	Twilight	111	La Fin du donjon	4	The End of Dungeon	Mazan	March 2014
112	Twilight	112	Pourfendeurs de démons	—	—	Obion	June 2021
113	Twilight	113	Passation	—	—	Obion	September 2024
1.5	Parade	1	Un donjon de trop	1	A Dungeon Too Many	Manu Larcenet	September 2000
1.5	Parade	2	Le Sage du ghetto	1	A Dungeon Too Many	Manu Larcenet	September 2001
1.5	Parade	3	Le Jour des crapauds	2	Day of the Toads	Manu Larcenet	April 2002
1.5	Parade	4	Des fleurs et des marmots	2	Day of the Toads	Manu Larcenet	November 2004
1.5	Parade	5	Technique Grogro	—	—	Manu Larcenet	June 2007
1.5	Parade	6	Garderie pour petiots	—	—	Alexis Nesme	January 2021
1.5	Parade	7	Le Sirop des costauds	—	—	Tébo	January 2025
1.5	Parade	8	L'Hostellerie des impôts	—	—	Erwann Surcouf	January 2025
1.5	Parade	9	Nécromancien pour de faux	—	—	Delaf	April 2025
1.5	Parade	10	Micro-héros	—	—	Willy Ohm	April 2025
1.5	Parade	11	Éternel repos	—	—	Thibaut Soulcié	June 2025
1.5	Parade	12	Chaos crescendo	—	—	Mathieu Burniat	June 2025
−4	Monstres	1	Jean-Jean la terreur	1	The Crying Giant	Mazan	May 2001
3.5	Monstres	2	Le Géant qui pleure	1	The Crying Giant	Jean-Christophe Menu	October 2001
103	Monstres	3	La Carte majeure	2	The Dark Lord	Andreas	November 2002
103	Monstres	4	Le Noir Seigneur	2	The Dark Lord	Blanquet	May 2003
−97.5	Monstres	5	La Nuit du tombeur	4	Night of the Ladykiller	Jean-Emmanuel Vermot-Desroches	February 2003
40	Monstres	6	Du ramdam chez les brasseurs	4	Night of the Ladykiller	Yoann	April 2003
−90	Monstres	7	Mon fils le tueur	5	My Son the Killer	Blutch	September 2003
−85	Monstres	8	Crève-cœur	3	Heartbreaker	Carlos Nine	January 2004
75	Monstres	9	Les Profondeurs	3	Heartbreaker	Patrice Killoffer	August 2004
95	Monstres	10	Des soldats d'honneur	5	My Son the Killer	Bézian	January 2006
−400	Monstres	11	Le Grand Animateur	6	The Great Animator	Stanislas	September 2007
6	Monstres	12	Le Grimoire de l'inventeur	6	The Great Animator	Nicolas Keramidas	January 2008
79	Monstres	13	Réveille-toi et meurs	—	—	David B.	November 2020
7	Monstres	14	La Bière supérieure	—	—	Bastien Quignon	October 2021
−24	Monstres	15	Les Poupoutpapillonneurs	—	—	Juanungo	May 2022
−79	Monstres	16	Quelque part ailleurs	—	—	Guy Delisle	October 2022
114	Monstres	17	Un héritage trompeur	—	—	Bertrand Gatignol	April 2023
115	Monstres	18	Noces de fleurs	—	—	Aude Picault	March 2024
−10,000	Antipodes −	−10000	L'Armée du crâne	—	—	Grégory Panaccione	January 2020
−9,999	Antipodes −	−9999	L'Inquisiteur mégalomane	—	—	Grégory Panaccione	March 2021
10,000	Antipodes +	10000	Rubéus Khan	—	—	Vince	September 2020
10,001	Antipodes +	10001	Le Coffre aux âmes	—	—	Vince	January 2022
10,002	Antipodes +	10002	Changement de programme	—	—	Vince	October 2023
10,003	Antipodes +	10003	Retour de flamme	—	—	Vince	October 2024
10,003	Antipodes +	10004	Un projet qui se trame	—	—	Vince	April 2026
—N/a	Bonus	1	Clefs en main	—	—	Lewis Trondheim; Joann Sfar; Writing: Arnaud Moragues	October 2001
—N/a	Bonus	2	Création et parchemins	—	—	Lewis Trondheim; Joann Sfar	November 2023
—N/a	Bonus	3	Dynastie et magiciens	—	—	Lewis Trondheim; Joann Sfar; Writing: Arnaud Moragues; Pierre Chabosy	June 2024

== Main characters ==
- Herbert the Duck is the "hero" of the story, and appears in at least Donjon Zenith and Crepuscule series. As his name suggests, he is a duck, although he has a humanoid body, and is covered in feathers. He is the possessor of the Sword of Destiny (a parody of other mystical weapons in adventure books). This sword is unique in that it can talk, and that has many mystical powers, such as being able to glow in the dark, being able to summon former bearers when someone other than its legitimate user tries to hold it, and not allowing the use of any other weapon by its owner. Also, one side of its blade has the enigmatic property of being able to cut -and even behead- living beings without killing them.
- Marvin the Dragon serves as the reluctant instructor and protector of Herbert the Duck. Marvin is a fierce warrior who loves a good fight, but at the same time he is bound by the principles of his religion. He is a strict vegetarian, refuses to eat "human" or animal flesh and will not attack anyone who has insulted him. Like other dragons, he can breathe fire, but will do so only when strictly necessary. Initially caused by indigestion due to eating little blue mushrooms, Marvin is capable of producing a "Tong Deum", a large blast of fire-breath. He looks vaguely humanoid, with huge muscles and scarlet skin. Marvin is loyal to his boss, the Keeper - though not entirely averse to keeping him in the dark about certain matters.
- Hyacinthe de Cavallere (aka the Dungeon Master or "the Keeper") is a greedy, yet lovable, capitalist who only cares about enriching himself by attracting adventurers and treasure-seekers to his Dungeon, where they will leave their corpses and possessions. In his youth, Hyacinthe was actually quite idealistic, and disguised himself as the nocturnal crime fighter "the Night Shirt". The Dungeon's core is the ancestral keep of the de Cavellere family, though greatly enlarged during Hyacinthe's lifetime.
- Marvin the Red, the hero of the Crepuscule/Twilight series. He is a tall, thin rabbit, colored bright red. He is a young warrior and very impetuous.
