= Bea Wolf =

2023 graphic novel by Zach Weinersmith

- Author: Zach Weinersmith
- Illustrator: Boulet
- Language: English
- Genre: Graphic novel
- Publisher: First Second Books
- Publication date: 2023

Bea Wolf is a 2023 graphic novel written by Zach Weinersmith and illustrated by Boulet, retelling the story of Beowulf with modern suburban children. It was published by First Second Books.

== Synopsis ==
In a land of children known for their feats of fun, the tree house Treeheart is besieged by the middle-aged Mr. Grindle, whose touch can bring a fate worse than death: adolescence and adulthood. To face this foe comes a child warrior: Bea Wolf.

== Reception ==
Bea Wolf was a finalist for the 2024 Hugo Award for Best Graphic Story.

School Library Journal called it "unconventional", "(l)ofty in its ambitions and artistic renderings," and "strangely perfect in its perfect strangeness", lauding Boulet's "intense linework and incredible shading" and emphasizing that the text is "meant to be read out loud". The Bulletin of the Center for Children's Books praised it as "magnificent" and "a wild embrace of absurdity and wit with exaggerated language used for maximum impact", whose "illustrations are no less epic than the story" and "invite careful examination".

Kirkus Reviews considered that, despite its "slapdash magical realism," the book is "an unabashedly joyful ode to the freedom of the child's mind" and "wonderfully weird". Publishers Weekly commended it as "lovingly crafted", "truly fresh [and] inventive", and "a joyously lyric, rapid-fire epic that honors the original's intricate linguistic constructions," noting its "racially diverse cast of fierce, distinctively rendered children."

In The New York Times, Sarah Boxer was more critical, assessing the characters as having goals that "are tediously uniform: sweets, toys and staying up late," the plot as "long (and) confusing", and the art as "sometimes funny (but) mostly chaotic." Boxer particularly faulted the story's climax — rather than beheading Mr. Grindle, Bea Wolf reverts him to infancy — as being in violation of the story's internal logic, arguing that if being made into an adult is a punishment, then being made into an infant would be a reward.

== Sequels ==
Weinersmith plans to produce at least one sequel, which would be about Grendel's mother and the dragon.
