= Astichus =

Scientific classification
- Domain: Eukaryota
- Kingdom: Animalia
- Phylum: Arthropoda
- Class: Insecta
- Order: Hymenoptera
- Family: Eulophidae
- Subfamily: Entiinae
- Genus: Astichus; Förster, 1856

Type species
- Astichus arithmeticus (Förster, 1851)

Species
- 30 species

Genus of wasps

Astichus is a genus of hymenopteran insects of the family Eulophidae.
