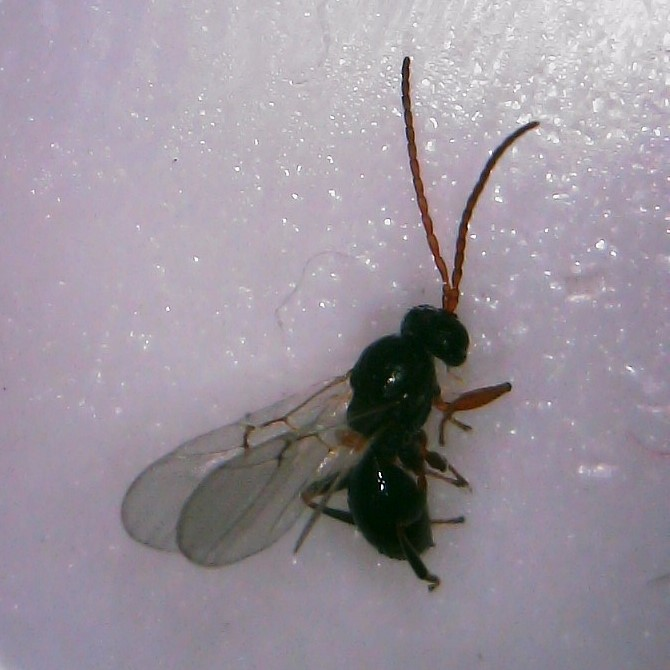

Scientific classification
- Kingdom: Animalia
- Phylum: Arthropoda
- Clade: Pancrustacea
- Class: Insecta
- Order: Hymenoptera
- Family: Cynipidae
- Genus: Andricus
- Species: A. quercuspetiolicola

Binomial name
- Andricus quercuspetiolicola (Bassett, 1863)

Synonyms
- Cynips quercuspetiolicola Bassett, 1863; Cynips petiolicola Osten-Sacken, 1865; Andricus quinqueseptum Ashmead, 1890; Andricus cicatricula Bassett, 1890; Andricus concolorans Kinsey, 1920

= Andricus quercuspetiolicola =

Species of wasp

Andricus quercuspetiolicola, also called the oak petiole gall wasp, is a species of oak gall wasp in the family Cynipidae. Galls in which the larvae live and feed are formed along the midrib or petiole of white oak leaves.

== Range ==
This species occurs throughout the eastern half of North America where its host plants grow.

== Galls ==
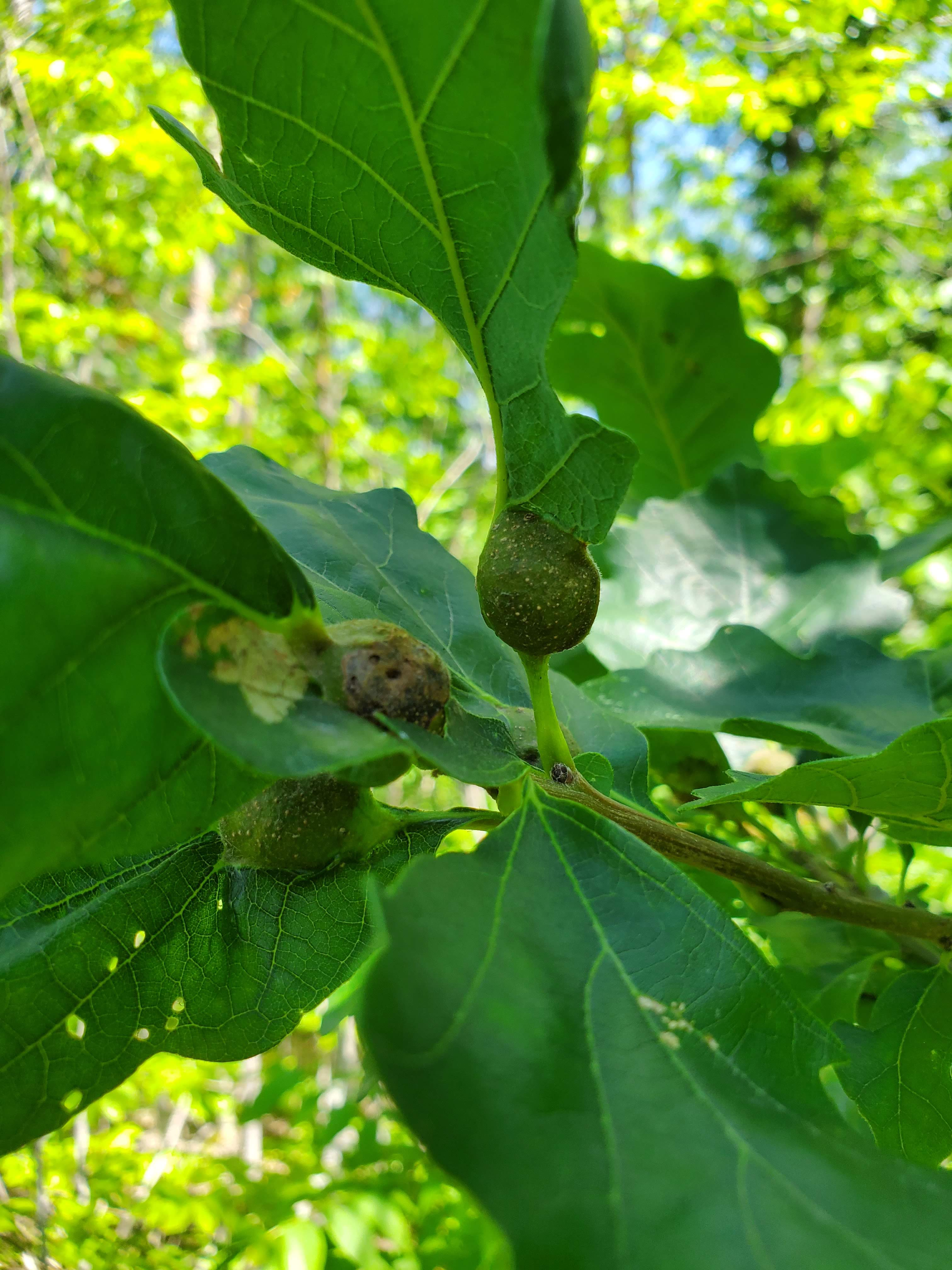
Galls on bur oak

The oak petiole gall wasp forms galls on white oaks, including Quercus alba, Q. bicolor, Q. montana, Q. macrocarpa, Q. michauxii, Q. prinoides, and Q. stellata.

The galls of the sexual generation are round or club-shaped and formed on the petiole or midrib of the leaves in spring, with adults of both sexes emerging from galls in late June and early July. The gall is a firm swelling with a scar at the apex and contains several cells, each with a larva. It is initially green but becomes brown and woody as it ages.

The galls and timing of the agamic generation are unknown.

Parasitoids of the oak petiole gall wasp include the crypt-keeper wasp (Euderus set).

== Taxonomy ==
The adults were first described by Homer Franklin Bassett in 1863 with the name Cynips quercuspetiolicola, though the galls had been previously described by Carl Robert Osten-Sacken. This species is now considered to be in the genus Andricus, and several other names are considered synonyms.
