= Open Borders: The Science and Ethics of Immigration =

2019 graphic novel by Bryan Caplan and Zach Weinersmith

- Author: Bryan Caplan
- Illustrator: Zach Weinersmith
- Publisher: First Second
- Publication date: October 29, 2019
- Media type: Graphic novel
- Pages: 256
- ISBN: 9781250316974

Open Borders: The Science and Ethics of Immigration is a nonfiction graphic novel by Bryan Caplan and Zach Weinersmith. It was published in 2019 by First Second.

== Summary ==
The book presents economic and ethical arguments for open borders between countries in a graphic novel format. It suggests that the economic benefits of open borders outweigh the potential downsides. It also rebuts common arguments against immigration such as the economic impact on low-skill native workers and the cultural changes it causes.

== Reception ==
Publishers Weekly praised Caplan's expertise and Weinersmith's art and storytelling skill, saying that the combination made for a compelling argument. While National Review said that the book was "fun to read" and well-presented, they also argued that Caplan did not address some obvious counterarguments against open borders and oversimplified the issue. The book was also reviewed by Booklist and The Economist.
