= Bellerus =

Scientific classification
- Kingdom: Animalia
- Phylum: Arthropoda
- Class: Insecta
- Order: Hymenoptera
- Family: Eulophidae
- Subfamily: Entiinae
- Genus: Bellerus; Walker, 1843

Type species
- Bellerus anaitis (Walker, 1843)

Species
- Bellerus ambrotos De Santis, 1966; Bellerus anaitis (Walker, 1843); Bellerus halidayi De Santis, 1966; Bellerus laonome (Walker, 1839); Bellerus nesioticus De Santis, 1966; Bellerus rhianus (Walker, 1842)

Genus of wasps

Bellerus is a genus of hymenopteran insects of the family Eulophidae.
