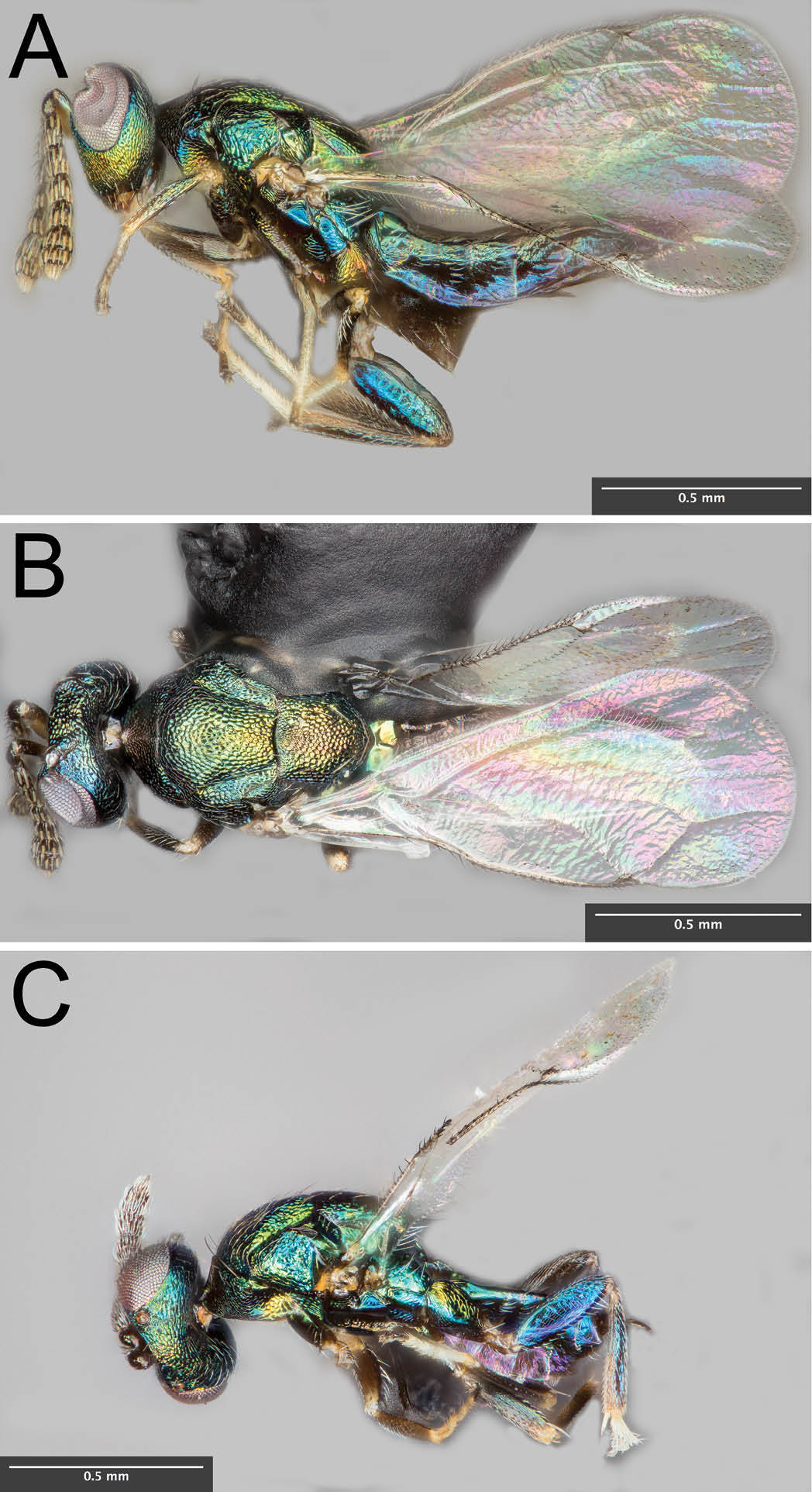
- A. and B. female; C. male
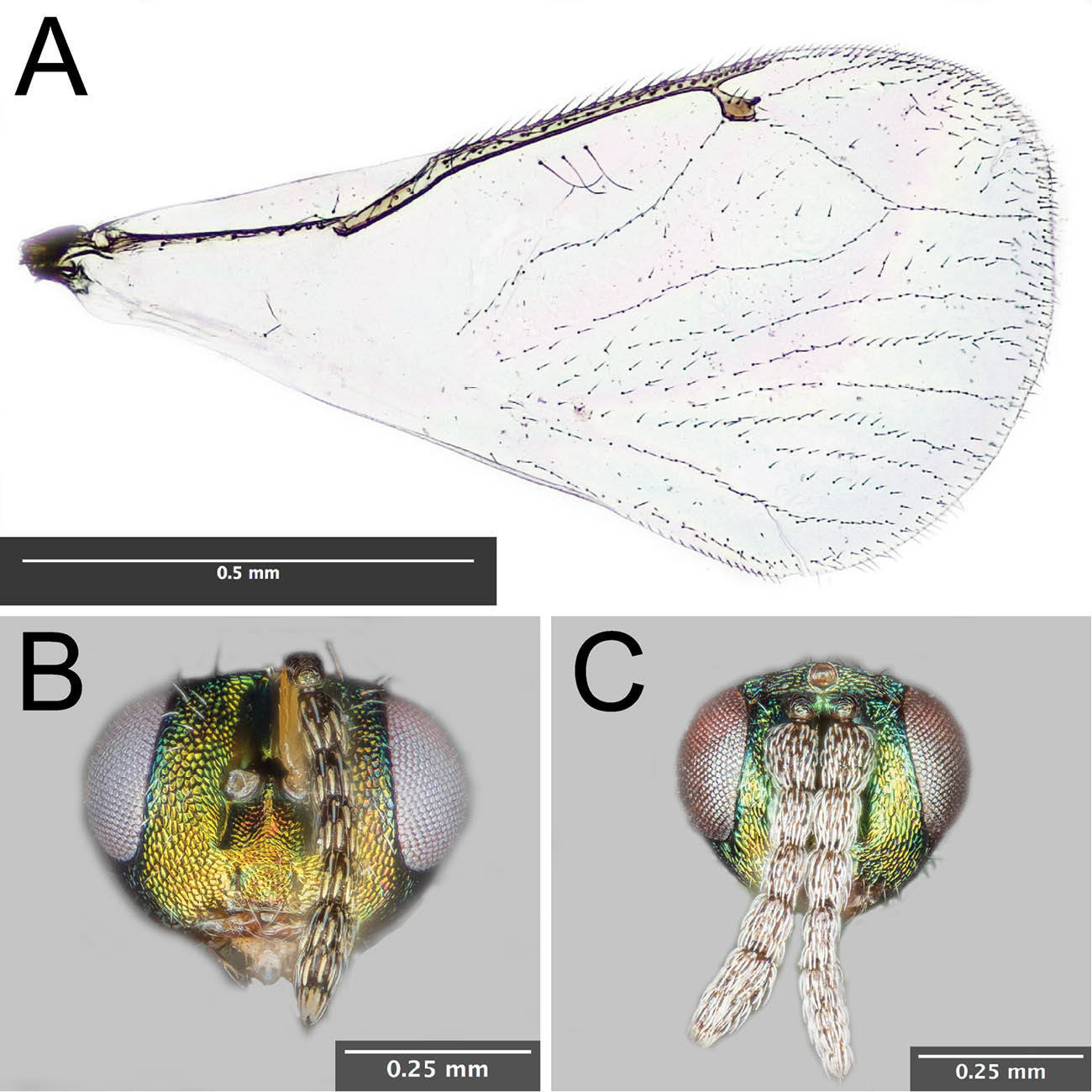
- A. male right forewing; B. female head; C. male head

Scientific classification
- Kingdom: Animalia
- Phylum: Arthropoda
- Clade: Pancrustacea
- Class: Insecta
- Order: Hymenoptera
- Family: Eulophidae
- Genus: Euderus
- Species: E. set

Binomial name
- Euderus set Egan, Weinersmith, & Forbes, 2017

= Euderus set =

Species of wasp

Euderus set, the crypt-keeper wasp, is a tiny chalcid wasp from the family Eulophidae from the United States, described in 2017 as a parasitoid of the gall wasp Bassettia pallida. The description of its life cycle has attracted widespread publicity.

== Description ==
The predominant colour of the adult wasp is metallic green to turquoise to iridescent blue, depending on age, with a yellow scape and white tarsi which have a dark brown terminal segment. Females are 1.6mm to 2.3mm in length, males are 1.2mm to 1.6mm.

== Discovery ==
One of the parasitologists to co-discover the species was Kelly Weinersmith.

== Distribution and habitat ==
The type locality of Euderus set was Inlet Beach, Florida and it has since been recorded throughout the midwestern, southcentral and southeastern United States. Specimens have been collected from galls on oaks from several subsections of the genus Quercus.

== Biology ==
The female Euderus set searches for the galls or "crypts" induced by the gall wasps Bassettia pallida, Andricus quercuspetiolicola, and possibly others. The female E. set then oviposits in the chamber of the gall. When the egg hatches, the larva of E. set burrows into the larva of the host wasp. It then manipulates the host so that it speeds up its development, metamorphoses into an adult and chews its way up to the surface months earlier than normal. When the host does this, the burrow is not wide enough for it to emerge from the stem and its head becomes stuck. The E. set larva then consumes the host and chews through its head to emerge as an adult. The larvae overwinter in the gall, eating the host, and emerge in the following spring. The mechanism used to manipulate the host is not known.

If the adults of E. set have to excavate their own exit tunnel through the plant tissue themselves, they are three times more likely to die than are those that have the host excavate the tunnel for them.

E. set appears to be most closely related to Euderus crawfodii and E. multilineata, in the sub-genus Neoeuderus, together with another wasp which is a parasitoid of a pin oak gall wasp. The wasps in the sub-genus Neoeuderus appear to be specialist parasitoids of the gall wasps of the family Cynipidae.

== Naming ==
The specific name is the name of the Egyptian god Set, who trapped his brother Osiris in a sarcophagus before killing him and cutting him up into little pieces.
