= Kelly Weinersmith =

American biologist and author

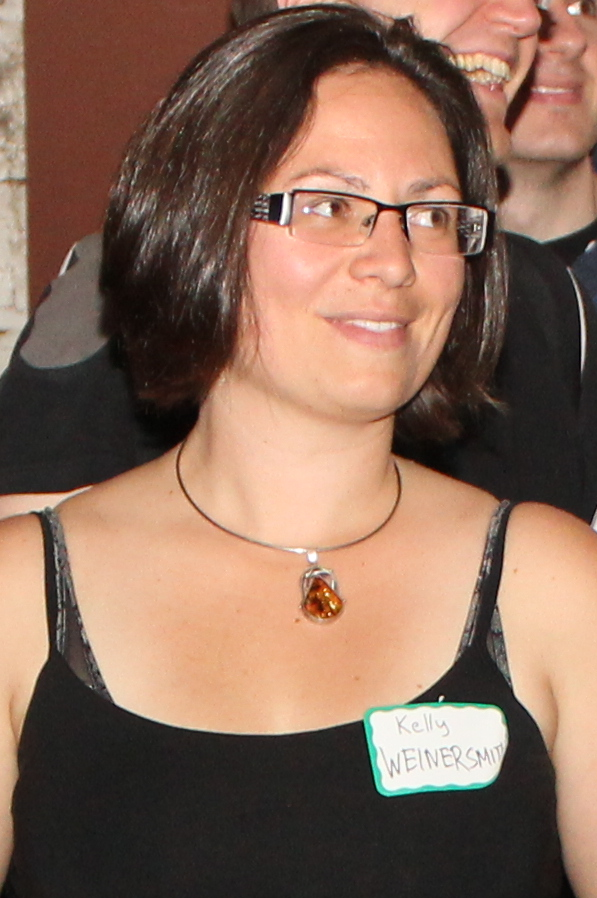
Weinersmith in 2011

Kelly Weinersmith (née Smith) is an American biologist, writer, and podcaster. She is a member of the faculty at Rice University in the Department of BioSciences, and an alumni collaborator with the Parasite Ecology Group at the University of California, Santa Barbara. She is co-author, with her husband Zach Weinersmith, of popular science books Soonish (2017) and A City on Mars (2023).

== Research ==
A parasitologist, Weinersmith is the co-discoverer of Euderus set, commonly known as the crypt-keeper wasp.

== Books ==
- Soonish: Ten Emerging Technologies That'll Improve and/or Ruin Everything (2017) is a work Kelly co-authored with her husband Zach Weinersmith looking at upcoming technologies that could change the future. The book made #7 in Science on The New York Times bestsellers in the science book category.
- A City on Mars: Can We Settle Space, Should We Settle Space, and Have We Really Thought This Through? (2023), which Kelly also co-authored with her husband Zach Weinersmith, is a popular science book on space settlement and challenges facing a potential colonization of Mars, colonization of the Moon, and related activities. In particular, it draws on Weinersmith's experience as an ecologist to study maintaining ecologies off-Earth where the humans in them do not all rapidly perish, a difficult task. The work made 11th place on The New York Times Best Seller list for all hardback non-fiction books. It was awarded the 2024 Royal Society Trivedi Science Book Prize.

== Other activities ==
Weinersmith is co-host of the podcast Daniel and Kelly's Extraordinary Universe, and regular co-host of the podcast Science... sort of.

She was a speaker at Smithsonian Magazine's "2015 Future Is Here Festival".
