= Zach Weinersmith =

American cartoonist and writer (born 1982)

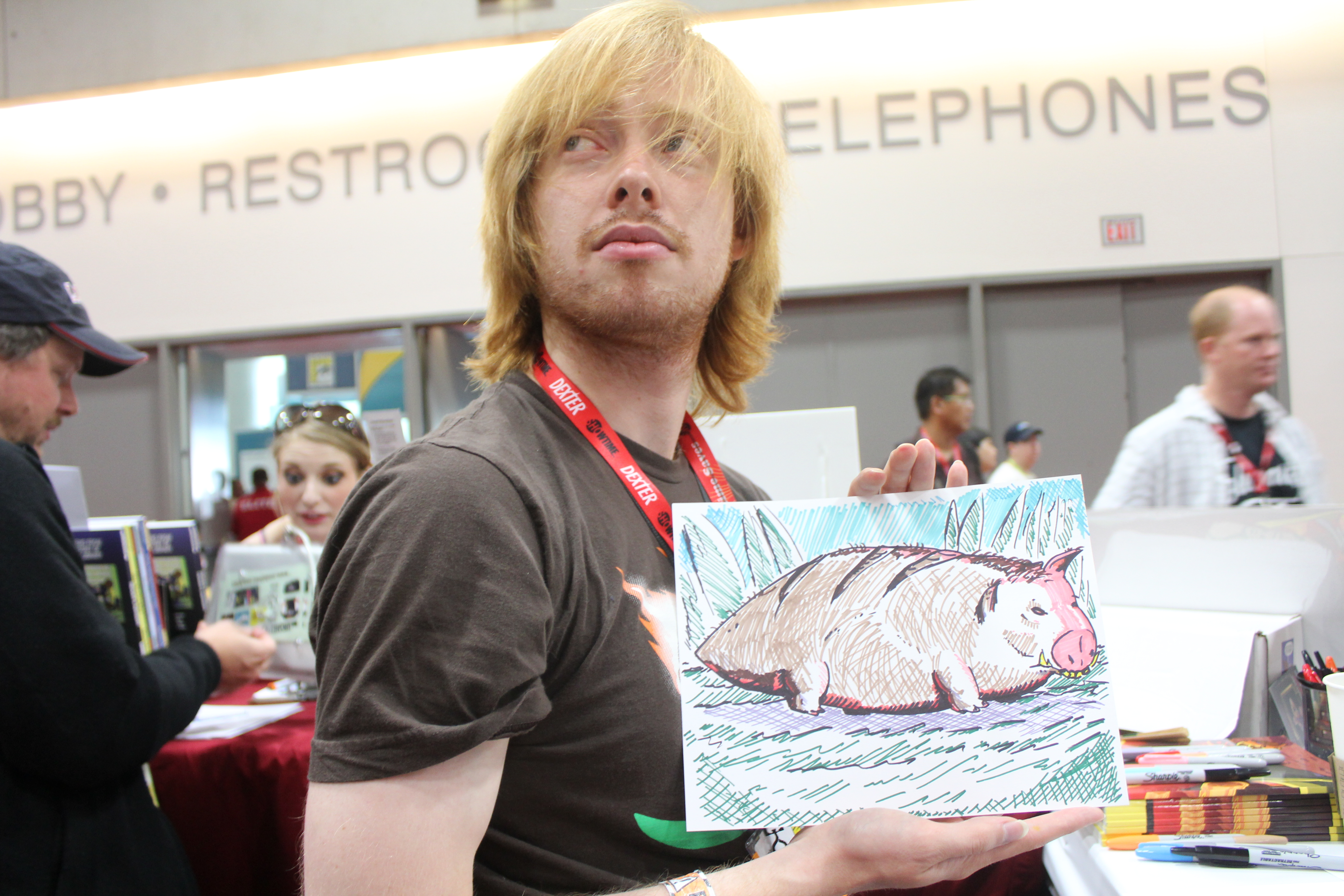
- Weinersmith with a sketch at San Diego Comic-Con, in 2011
- Born: Zachary Alexander Weiner; March 5, 1982 (age 44)
- Occupations: Webcomic writer and illustrator
- Known for: Saturday Morning Breakfast Cereal
- Spouse: Kelly Weinersmith
- Children: 2

Signature
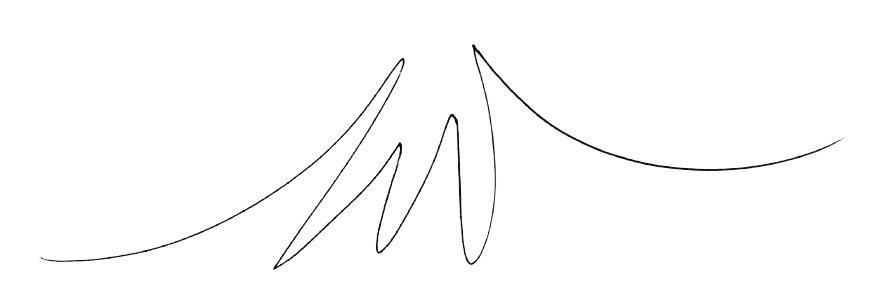

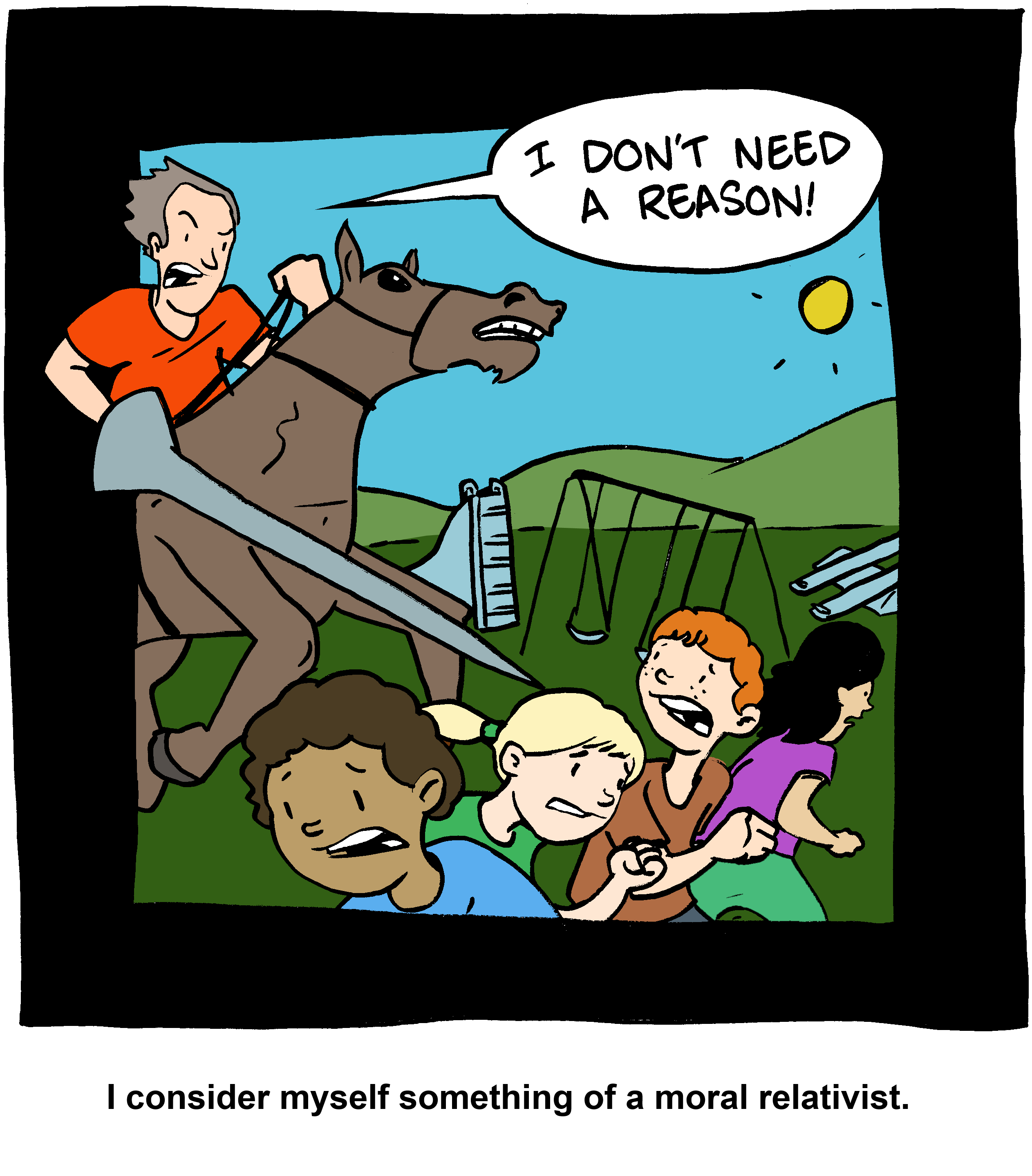
Saturday Morning Breakfast Cereal comic #1127, published on 25 March 2008

Zachary Alexander Weinersmith (né Weiner; born March 5, 1982) is an American cartoonist and writer, best known for his webcomic Saturday Morning Breakfast Cereal (SMBC). Outside of SMBC, he has worked on a sketch comedy series, a podcast, and multiple other webcomics. With his wife Kelly Weinersmith, he has co-authored the 2017 book Soonish and the 2023 book A City on Mars. He illustrated the 2019 book Open Borders by economist Bryan Caplan, and wrote the 2023 children's book Bea Wolf, a loose adaptation of Beowulf.

== Background and personal life ==
According to Weinersmith, his great-grandfather immigrated to the United States in 1925, and he has no family in Europe as they were killed in the Holocaust. Weinersmith describes being "raised Jewish, in an only casually religious environment".

Weinersmith has been writing and drawing comics since high school, often using the name "Saturday Morning Breakfast Cereal" for these comics. His early webcomics usually had three or more panels, but in 2002 he switched to a single-panel format.

Weinersmith graduated from Pitzer College in California with an English degree in 2003. He then worked in the film industry for around two years, including at The Asylum, and later a talent agency. With the success of SMBC, Weinersmith returned to college at San Jose State University in order to satisfy personal interests while also creating topics and creative ideas for his comics; initially planning on biochemistry, he opted to pursue physics. By 2007, he was able to earn a living from the comic.

While in California he met Kelly Smith, then a graduate student at U.C. Davis, later an adjunct professor at Rice University. They married, and both took the combined surname Weinersmith. They have two children, Ada and Ben. The Weinersmiths reside in Charlottesville, Virginia.

In an interview in 2009, Weinersmith described his personal philosophy as "pragmatic" and said he is "probably" agnostic, saying "though I’m probably not willing to call myself an atheist per se, I almost certainly behave like an atheist, when it comes to specific activities related to spirituality."

== Saturday Morning Breakfast Cereal ==
Weinersmith authors Saturday Morning Breakfast Cereal (SMBC), a popular webcomic that is updated daily. It features few recurring characters or storylines and has no set format. Recurring themes in SMBC include religion, superheroes, romance, dating, science, research, parenting and the meaning of life.

Weinersmith's first version of SMBC was a character-based three-panel strip done while he was in college. This version of the comic focused on the romantic and academic endeavors of several college students. This version (referred to as Classic SMBC on the site's archives) ran from January 28, 2002, to September 3, 2002. Weinersmith then switched to single-panel and gag comics. That version of the strip began on September 5, 2002. SMBC is now a multi-panel comic.

In 2005, Weinersmith wanted to work on SMBC full-time, and around this time moved to daily updates. By 2007, he was able to earn a living from the comic. Weinersmith also returned to study around 2006 to provide inspiration for the comic, and studied physics, and considers that the rise in the geekiness of the comic happened at that time.

As of 2012, SMBC received a quarter-million visitors a day and was described as one of the most popular webcomics.

== Other projects ==
=== Books ===
- Trial of the Clone: An Interactive Adventure! (2012) is a gamebook authored by Weinersmith and illustrated by Chris Jones.
- 2^{7} Nerd Disses: A Significant Quantity of Disrespect (2013) is an e-book of nerdy insults co-written by Weinersmith and Phil Plait and illustrated by Jess Fink.
- Augie and the Green Knight (2015) is a children's book written by Weinersmith and illustrated by Gilles Roussel (known as Boulet). The book features an adventurous and scientifically minded female protagonist in a retelling of the medieval romance Sir Gawain and the Green Knight. Weinersmith said it was an attempt to give his daughter a book "about little girls who are smart, and scientific, and (here's the crucial thing) risk-taking." The book was financed through the crowdfunding website Kickstarter, receiving $US384,410.
- Soonish (2017) is a collaboration between Weinersmith and his wife Kelly Weinersmith looking at upcoming technologies that could change the future. The book reached multiple New York Times Bestseller lists.
- Open Borders: The Science and Ethics of Immigration (2019) is an illustrated book about the history and potential benefits of open border policies, co-written with Bryan Caplan.
- Bea Wolf (2023) is a children's book written by Weinersmith and illustrated by Gilles Roussel (known as Boulet). The book is a retelling of the Beowulf tale.
- A City on Mars: Can we settle space, should we settle space, and have we really thought this through? (2023) is a popular science book on space settlement and challenges facing a potential colonization of Mars, colonization of the Moon, and related activities.
- Sawyer Lee and the Quest to Just Stay Home (2026) is a children's book about a child's attempts to avoid going on an adventure.

Collections of SMBC comics have also been published in physical books.

=== Other webcomics ===
- Vince Invincible is a comic first published in 2003 with three later installments in April 2005. It follows a boy named Vince who is impervious to any form of harm.
- Baby Moloch is a short origin story for the character Moloch, who featured in several of the earlier SMBC single-panel strips.
- Chason! is a comic based on a character, Chason, from the multi-panel days of SMBC. It was written by Weinersmith, but was illustrated by a new artist from the 20th comic.
- Captain Stupendous (formerly Captain Excelsior until the name was changed for legal reasons) is a comic project written by Weinersmith and illustrated by Chris Jones. Captain Stupendous is a recently divorced superhero and the comic follows his romantic and family life. It launched in January 2007 and was completed after 95 pages in 2008. Captain Stupendous was published in book form by IDW Publishing.
- Snowflakes is a webcomic set in an orphanage. It was scripted by Weinersmith, from story and plotting by James Ashby and art by Chris Jones. It was completed in 2013.
- Laws and Sausages is a political science webcomic co-written by brothers Greg Weiner and Zach Weinersmith and drawn by Dennis Culver. It ran from 2018–2019.
- A Comic Strip Tour Of The Wild World Of Pandemic Modeling is a one-off article on FiveThirtyEight in April 2020 on modelling the spread of COVID-19 and pandemics in general, presented in comic strip form and illustrated by Weinersmith.

=== Video and audio ===
- The Jerry Simpiro Project is a mockumentary of a fictional webcomic creator.
- SMBC-Theater is a sketch comedy series, made by Weinersmith and others. This was normally updated once a week on Mondays with one or two short sketches and as of February 2018 the channel had about 80,000 subscribers. Sketches were mainly one-shots, though there some characters had storylines, such as James Ashby as president, J.P. Nickel's news stories, Jon Brence's dating shorts, and Weinersmith as Jesus/James Ashby as God. In August 2011, a project was successfully crowdfunded on Kickstarter called "SMBC Theater Goes TO SPACE!". This became Starpocalypse, a space opera webseries, which was released on 25 December 2013, then released on their YouTube channel on May 3, 2015.
- The Weekly Weinersmith is a science podcast cohosted by Zach and his wife Kelly. The first episode of the podcast was released on October 5, 2011. The series ran from 2011 to 2014, with some later additional episodes to celebrate or promote books such as Soonish.

=== Live events ===
- Festival of Bad Ad Hoc Hypotheses (BAHFest) is a festival, started in 2013, where people present humorous incorrect scientific theories before a panel of judges who award a prize to the winner. Cities that have hosted BAHFest include Cambridge, Massachusetts; London; Sydney; and San Francisco.

== Awards and nominations ==
Year	Award	Work	Category	Result
2003	Web Cartoonists' Choice Awards	Saturday Morning Breakfast Cereal	Outstanding Short Form Comic	Nominated
2006	Web Cartoonists' Choice Awards	Saturday Morning Breakfast Cereal	Outstanding Single Panel Comic	Won
2007	Web Cartoonists' Choice Awards	Saturday Morning Breakfast Cereal	Outstanding Single Panel Comic	Won
2008	Web Cartoonists' Choice Awards	Saturday Morning Breakfast Cereal	Outstanding Single Panel Comic	Nominated

== Filmography ==
Year	Work	Role	Director
2005	Intermedio	Production assistant; Actor (Intermedio)	Andrew Lauer
2005	Way of the Vampire	Actor (Vampire)	Sarah Nean Bruce, Eduardo Durão
2005	War of the Worlds	Actor (Garysville Policeman/Townsperson)	David Michael Latt
2006	Girl with Gun	Set production assistant	Russ Emanuel
2007	Foul Shot	Production assistant	Danilo Mancinelli
2009-2012	SMBC Theater	Writer, Actor	Jason Axinn
2010-2012	SMBC Theater	Director	Directed episodes: "Orientation", "Working from Home", "The Tale of James", "Just Friendship" and "Heaven"
2012	The Ghastly Love of Johnny X	Production assistant	Paul Bunnell

== See also ==
- Create a Comic Project
- List of webcomic creators
- Lists of webcomics
