= Saturday Morning Breakfast Cereal =

Webcomic

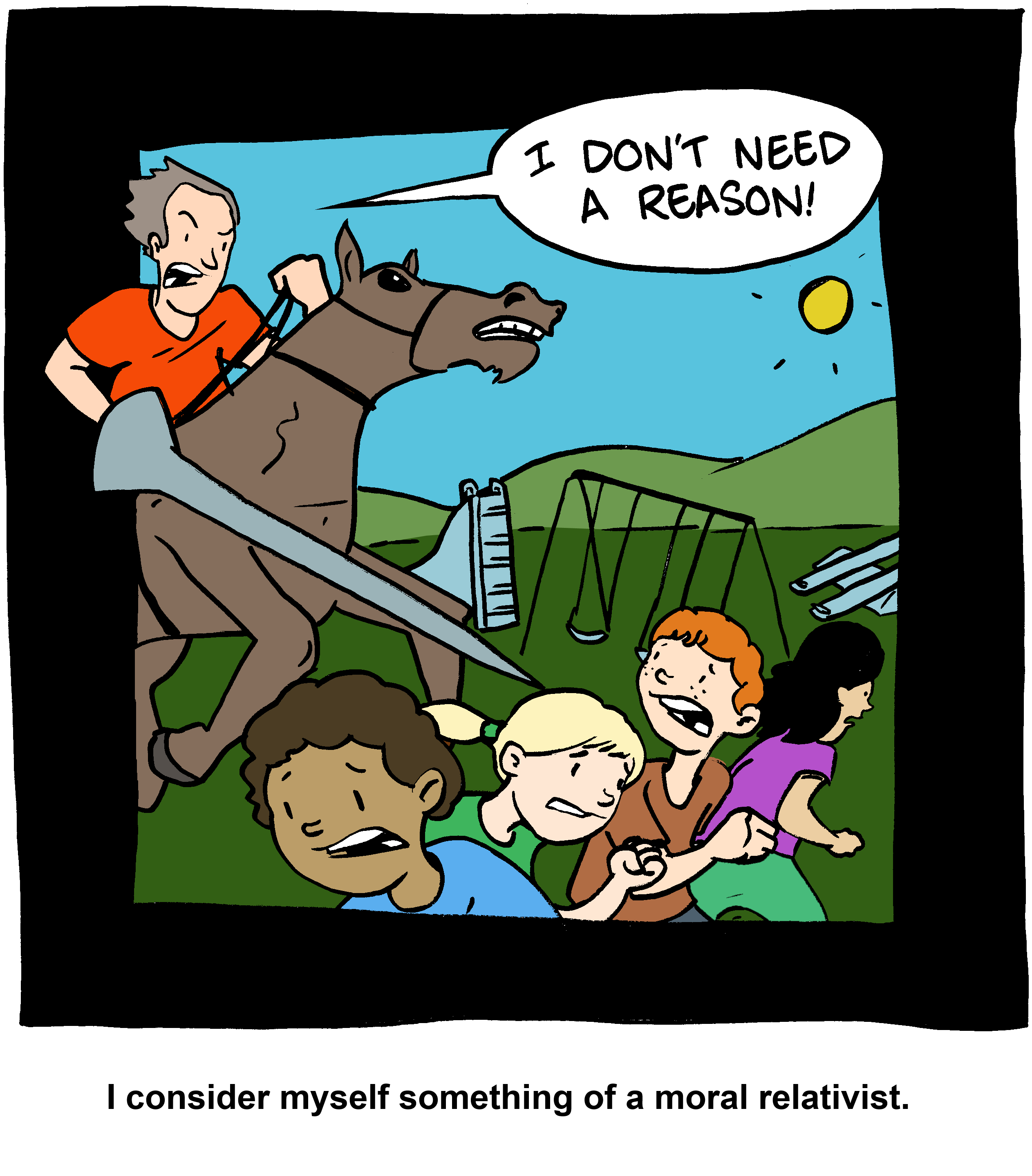
- SMBC comic #1127, published on 25 March 2008
- Author: Zach Weinersmith
- Website: Saturday Morning Breakfast Cereal
- Current status/schedule: Updated daily
- Launch date: September 5, 2002 (an earlier incarnation debuted January 28, 2002)
- Genre: Humor

Saturday Morning Breakfast Cereal (SMBC) is a webcomic by Zach Weinersmith. The gag-a-day comic features few recurring characters or storylines, and has no set format; some strips may be a single panel, while others may go on for ten panels or more. Recurring themes in SMBC include science, research, superheroes, religion, romance, dating, parenting and the meaning of life. SMBC has run since 2002 and is published daily.

Weinersmith's webcomic was recognized in 2006 and 2007 with the Web Cartoonists' Choice Award for Outstanding Single Panel Comic, and received nominations in 2003 and 2008.

== History ==
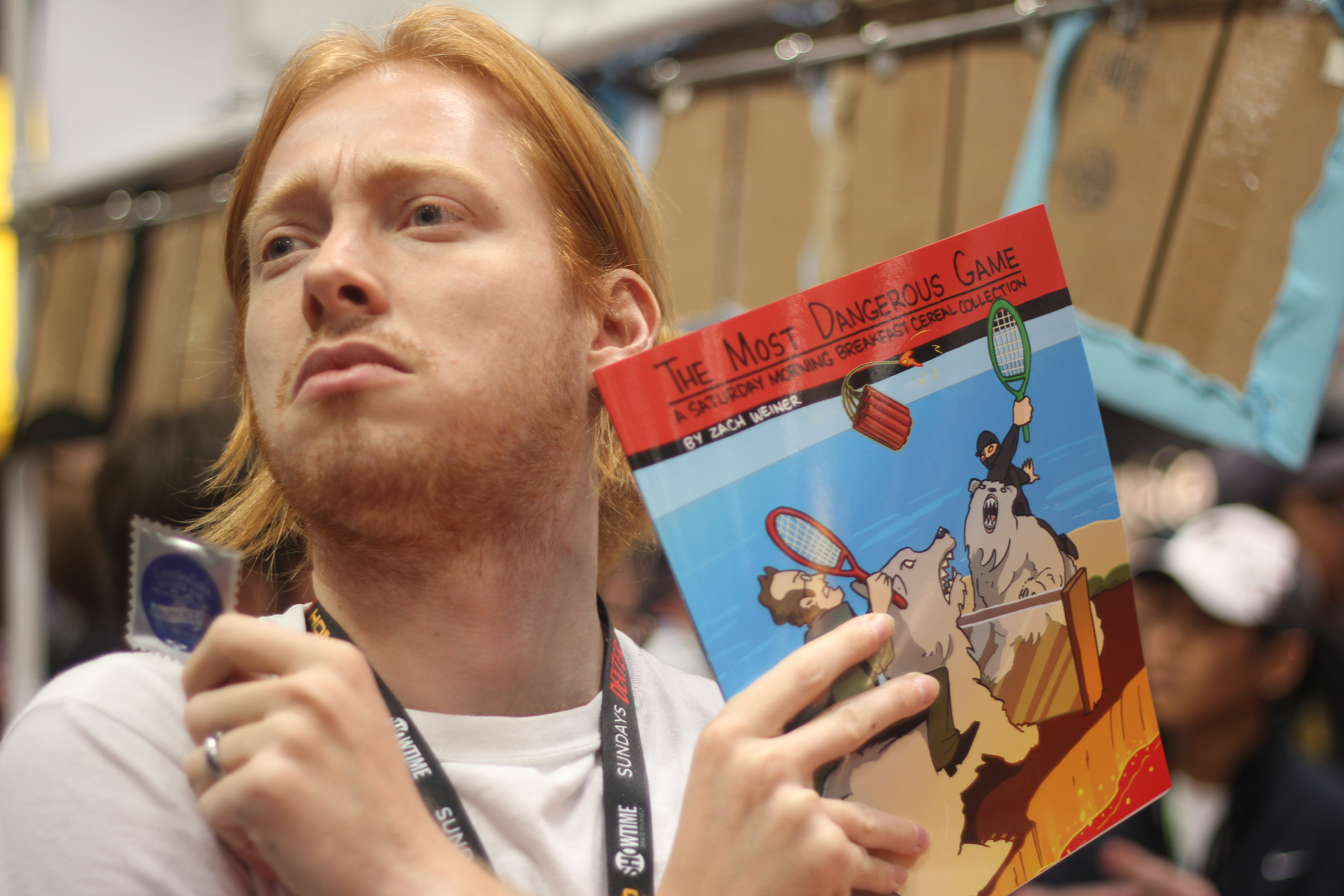
Zach Weinersmith in 2011

Weinersmith's first version of SMBC was a character-based three-panel strip done while he was in college. This version of the comic focused on the romantic and academic endeavors of several college students. This version (referred to as Classic SMBC on the site's archives) ran from January 28, 2002 to September 3, 2002. Weinersmith then switched to single-panel and gag comics. The current version of the strip began on September 5, 2002. The first 480 comics were originally removed from the main SMBC archives but were later returned as a hidden section and then made officially publicly available on September 22, 2008.

In 2005, Weinersmith wanted to work on SMBC full-time, and around this time moved to daily updates. By 2007, he was able to earn a living from the comic. Weinersmith also returned to study around 2006 to provide inspiration for the comic, and studied physics, and considers that the rise in the geekiness of the comic happened at that time.

As of 2012, SMBC received a quarter-million visitors a day and was described as one of the most popular webcomics.

Weinersmith has published a number of books collecting SMBC comics. He has also produced new comics to illustrate Soonish, a book he co-authored.

== Themes ==
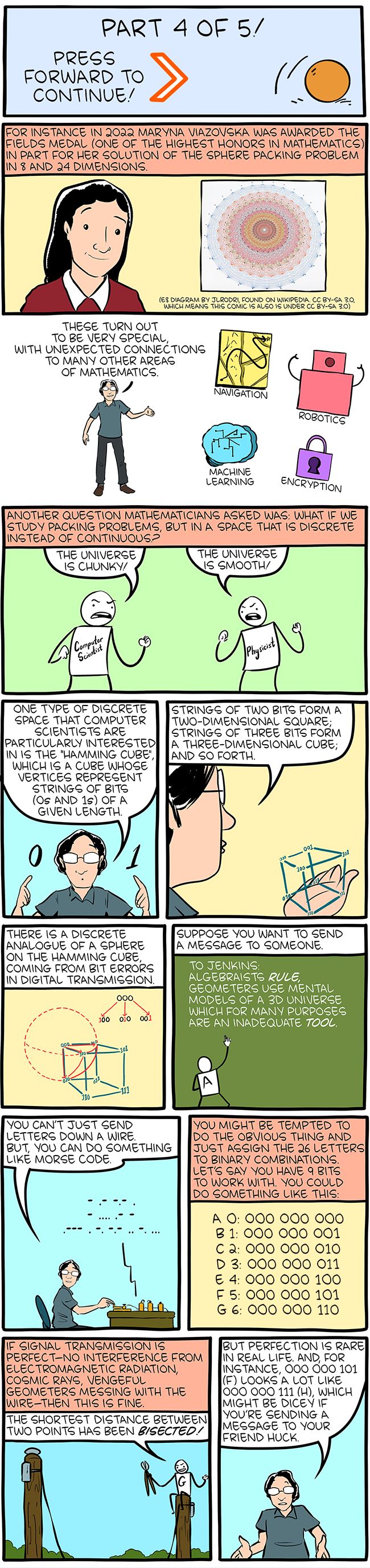
SMBC Spheres Part 4 (April 9, 2026), part of a series with Dr. Terence Tao explaining the mathematical problem of sphere packing.

In a 2016 interview, Weinersmith described the themes of SMBC as including science, philosophy, and economics, and has done enough comics on religion to release a book only of those comics.

== SMBC Theater ==
Weinersmith launched a side project linked with SMBC called SMBC Theater featuring skits and short videos put up on YouTube. This was normally updated once a week on Mondays with one or two short sketches and as of February 24, 2018 the channel had about 80,000 subscribers. Certain holiday clips are marked "part one", although very few have a second part. Despite its one-shot style there were certain characters who have received multiple storylines, such as James Ashby as president, J.P. Nickel's news stories, Jon Brence's dating shorts, and Weinersmith as Jesus/James Ashby as God. All the videos are satirical.

In August 2011, a project was successfully crowdfunded on Kickstarter called "SMBC Theater Goes TO SPACE!". This became Starpocalypse, a space opera webseries, which was released on 25 December 2013. It was released on their YouTube channel on May 3, 2015.

The channel stopped producing content between 2015 and 2020 when James Ashby started making Hand to Mouth skits.

== Reception ==
Saturday Morning Breakfast Cereal was recognized in 2006, and 2007 with the Web Cartoonists' Choice Award for Outstanding Single Panel Comic. It has been nominated for the award two other times, in 2003 and in 2008. Saturday Morning Breakfast Cereal has been featured on a variety of websites and blogs, including The Economist, Glamour, Boing Boing, Bad Astronomy, Blastr, Blues News, Joystiq, and Freakonomics.

== Awards and nominations ==
Year	Award	Work	Category	Result
2003	Web Cartoonists' Choice Awards	Saturday Morning Breakfast Cereal	Outstanding Short Form Comic	Nominated
2006	Web Cartoonists' Choice Awards	Saturday Morning Breakfast Cereal	Outstanding Single Panel Comic	Won
2007	Web Cartoonists' Choice Awards	Saturday Morning Breakfast Cereal	Outstanding Single Panel Comic	Won
2008	Web Cartoonists' Choice Awards	Saturday Morning Breakfast Cereal	Outstanding Single Panel Comic	Nominated

== Collections ==
- Save Yourself, Mammal! (2011) ISBN 978-0982853702
- The Most Dangerous Game (2011) ISBN 978-0982853719
- Science: Ruining Everything Since 1543 (2013) ISBN 978-0982853733
- Religion: Ruining Everything Since 4004 B.C. (2016) ISBN 978-0997452204

== See also ==
- xkcd
- Homestuck
- Randall Munroe
- Andrew Hussie
