= Ricardo García Mercet =

Spanish naturalist (1860–1933)

Ricardo García Mercet (16 August 1860 – 12 May 1933) was a Spanish naturalist and entomologist.

He was a pharmacist attached to the Spanish military. At various times he was a member of the Spanish Royal Academy of Sciences, President of Sociedad Española de Historia Natural (Spanish society of Natural history); Secretary general of Asociación Española para el Progreso de las Ciencias (Spanish Association for the progress of science) and an Honorary Member of the entomological societies of Egypt and Chile.

His collections of Chalcidoidea are conserved in Museo Nacional de Ciencias Naturales in Madrid and the Natural History Museum of Giacomo Doria in Genoa.

== Works ==
1921 Fauna ibérica Himenópteros, fam. encírtidos Madrid :Museo Nacional de Ciencias Naturales
