= Doing Time =

Doing time is slang for spending time in a jail or prison.

It may also refer to:

- Doing Time (manga), a 1998 manga written by Kazuichi Hanawa
- Doing Time (2002 film), also Keimusho no Naka, a 2002 Japanese live-action film based on the manga by Kazuichi Hanawa
- Doing Time: Life Inside the Big House, a 1991 documentary film
- We're All Doing Time, a book by Bo Lozoff
- Doing Time, the US title of 1979 British film Porridge
- "Doing Time", an episode from the third season of SpongeBob SquarePants
- "Doing Time", a song by Bad Religion from the 1982 album How Could Hell Be Any Worse?
- "Doing Time", a song by Avenged Sevenfold from the 2013 album Hail to the King
- "Doing Time", a song by MxPx from the 1996 album Life in General

== See also ==
- Doing Time, Doing Vipassana, a 1997 Israeli documentary film
- "Doing Time with Ron Kuby", an American talk radio show syndicated by Air America Media
