= List of things named after Malala Yousafzai =

Pakistani activist and Nobel laureate

This is a list of things named after Malala Yousafzai, a Pakistani peace activist and Nobel Prize laureate known for her advocacy for girls' education.

== Awards ==
- 2011: the National Peace Award for Youth, a Pakistani award presented annually to children under the age of 18 in recognition of their "outstanding" contribution to any field such as education.

== Science ==
=== Asteroids ===
- 2015: 316201 Malala, an asteroid discovered by a NASA astronomer, Amy Mainzer.

=== Shapes ===
- 2017: British astronomers "selected a new set of shapes for constellations" and named it after her. The selected shapes represents stars from various fields such as sports, entertainment and politics. It also included an honorary book in recognition of Malala.

== Media ==
- 2013: I Am Malala, an autobiographical book by Malala Yousafzai.
- 2015: He Named Me Malala an American documentary film.
- 2017: Malala's Magic Pencil, a picture book written by Malala Yousafzai and illustrated by Kerascoët.
- 2020: Gul Makai, Indian biographical drama film titled after her online pseudonym Gul Makai.

== Places ==
- 2017: Malala Park, in Cubillos del Sil, Spain. It was originally proposed by the school authorities and named by 12 years old children at the International Women's Day event in 2015.
- 2019: Malala Yousafzai Public School, in Peel District School Board, Ontario, Canada.
- 2020: Malala Yousafzai Elementary School, in Fort Bend Independent School District, Texas, United States of America. After the elementary school was proposed, the district's board of trustees named it after the activist in 2018. The school officially opened in January 2020.

== Law and education ==
- 2013: Malala Fund, an international, non-profit organization that advocates for girls' education.
- 2020: Malala Yousafzai Scholarship Act, originally proposed in 2014.
