= Marsupilami =

Comic strip character created by André Franquin

- Marsupilami shouting his catchphrase

Publication information
- Publisher: Marsu Productions (since 1987)
- First appearance: Spirou magazine (31 January 1952)
- Created by: André Franquin
- Voiced by: Steve Mackall (Raw Toonage and 1993 series); Bruno Buidin (2000 series); Richard Dumont (My Friend Marsupilami); Marc Saez (Marsupilami Hoobah Hoobah Hop! and Our Neighbors the Marsupilamis)

Marsupilami is a Belgian comic book character and fictional animal species created by Belgian comic artist André Franquin. Its first appearance was in the 31 January 1952 issue of the Franco-Belgian comics magazine Spirou. Since then it appeared regularly in the popular Belgian comics series Spirou & Fantasio, as a pet of the main characters, until Franquin stopped working on the series; the character's final appearance in the series during Franquin's lifetime was in 1970.

In the late 1980s, another character of the same species, distinct from the pet Marsupilami owned by Spirou and Fantasio, got its own successful spin-off series of comic albums entitled Marsupilami, written by Greg, Yann, and Dugomier, and drawn by Batem. The 1987 release of the first Marsupilami album marked the debut publication of the publishing house Marsu Productions, which was named after the character.

Marsupilami has since become a multimedia franchise, with multiple animated series, feature films, video games, and a variety of other merchandise. The asteroid 98494 Marsupilami is named in its honour.

Marsupilami's adventures had been translated to several languages, like Dutch, German, Greek, Catalan, Spanish, Portuguese, English, Italian and several Scandinavian languages. The most recent English translations are published by the British publishing house Cinebook. More than three million albums of the Marsupilami series are claimed to have been sold by Marsu Productions.

In 2013, Dupuis bought Marsu Productions and its characters, thereby allowing a new production of Spirou & Fantasio adventures including the Marsupilami. The Marsupilami returned to the Spirou & Fantasio series in the album La Colère du Marsupilami, released in 2016.

== Naming ==
The name is a portmanteau of the words marsupial, Pilou-Pilou (the French name for Eugene the Jeep, a character Franquin loved as a child) and ami (French for friend).

The species' binomial name is given in Franquin's Spirou et les héritiers as Marsupilamus fantasii. Its specific epithet refers to the character Fantasio, who was tasked with finding a specimen by his late uncle. He successfully found one on his expedition to South America with Spirou and subsequently brought it to Europe, where it later became the pair's pet.

In Houba Banana, a 1997 album from the Marsupilami spin-off comic series written by Xavier Fauche and Eric Adam, its binomial name is given as Marsupilami franquini, referring to the real-life creator of the species, Franquin.

== Appearance and behavior ==
The marsupilami is a black-spotted yellow leopard-like creature with dog-like ears. Male marsupilamis have an incredibly long, strong, flexible, prehensile tail, used for almost any task. Female marsupilamis have a much shorter tail, but still long compared to real animals. Both the male and female are able to use their tail as a weapon, by tightening the end into a fist and the remainder of the tail into a springlike spiral for maximal force. This attack was responsible for the Danish and Norwegian translators choosing words similar to "spiral" over "marsupial" as the creature's name. Unlike the males, the females also walk on the tips of their toes. When the animal rebounds, he makes the noise: "Boing". Males are also drawn with their eyes not completely separated, as if the sclerae of both eyes have merged, while females are often drawn with two completely separate eyes. Female marsupilamis also have a different voice compared to the males. Males say "houba" most of the time, while females say "houbi". According to the L'Encyclopédie du Marsupilami, they are monotremes like the platypus and echidna, which explains why they lay eggs while having mammalian features. Like parrots and some corvid birds, the Marsupilami can also mimic human speech, and like an amphibian is able to breathe underwater as well as on land.

== Specimens ==
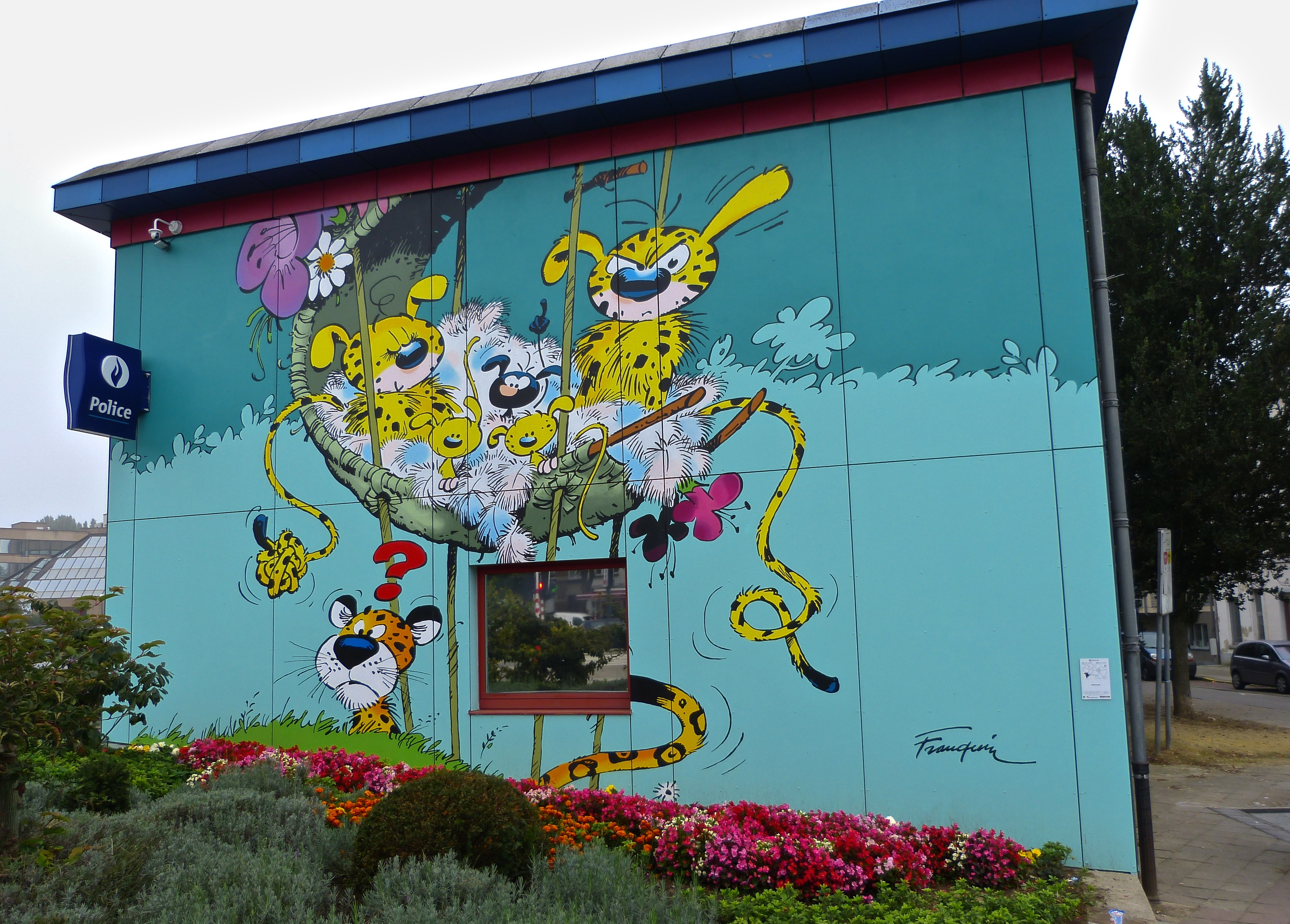
A wall painting in Brussels, Belgium, depicting the Marsupilami family from Le nid des Marsupilamis

The appellation "The Marsupilami" originally referred to the individual captured and then adopted by Spirou and Fantasio, which they never bothered to name because he was the only known specimen. The Spirou & Fantasio album Le nid des Marsupilamis introduces more marsupilami characters, none of whom are in captivity; the album is mostly concerned with a documentary-within-the-comic about the life of a family of marsupilamis living in the wild in Palombia. The later spin-off series Marsupilami, drawn by Batem, stars this family, and the title of the series, "Marsupilami", refers to the father in this family, who is also unnamed, and not to the pet Marsupilami owned by Spirou and Fantasio.

In these series, Marsupilami's wife is referred to as Marsupilamie (a female version of the name) but their three young are named, respectively, Bibi, Bibu and Bobo. Mars the Black is another specimen, which first appears in the album Mars the Black. A former captive marsupilami, he first finds it hard to live again in the forest. After failing to seduce Marsupilamie, he becomes jealous of Marsupilami and nearly gets into a fight with him. Later, he meets a black female marsupilami, named Venus, who becomes his mate. In Baby Prinz, another specimen, an elderly male who lives in a zoo, is featured. Altogether, that comes to eight specimens in Palombia, plus Spirou and Fantasio's pet.

Marsupilamis have been shown with multiple different fur colourations – yellow, yellow with black spots, black, white, white with black spots, and black with yellow spots. The most frequently seen fur colours are yellow with black spots, yellow with no spots, and black all over, as these are the variations seen within the main Marsupilami family in the Marsupilami comic series; these are also the fur colours that are regularly seen in the French animated series featuring the same family.

== Comics ==
=== Spirou & Fantasio ===
Spirou et les hommes-bulles, 1959, by Franquin

The following albums of Spirou & Fantasio feature the Marsupilami:

- 4. Spirou et les héritiers (Spirou and the Heirs, 1952). First appearance of the Marsupilami.
- 5. Les voleurs du Marsupilami (The Marsupilami Thieves, 1952, after an idea by Jo Almo). This story picks up exactly where Spirou et les héritiers ends.
- 7. Le dictateur et le champignon (The Dictator and the Mushroom, 1953)
- 8. La mauvaise tête (The Wrong Head, 1954) (Only in a short story at the end of the album)
- 9. Le repaire de la murène (The Murena's Hideout, 1955).
- 10. Les pirates du silence (Pirates of Silence, 1956, with Rosy (writing) and Will (backgrounds)); followed by La Quick Super (1956)
- 11. Le gorille a bonne mine (Gorilla's in Good Shape, 1956); followed by Vacances sans histoires (Uneventful Holidays)
- 12. Le nid des Marsupilamis (The Marsupilamis' Nest, 1957), which introduces a family of Marsupilamis living in the wild in Palombia; followed by La foire aux gangsters (Gangsters at the Fair)
- 13. Le voyageur du Mésozoïque (The Traveller from the Mesozoic, 1957); followed by La peur au bout du fil (Fear at the End of the Line, 1959, with Greg (writing))
- 14. Le prisonnier du Bouddha (The prisoner of the Buddha, 1959, with Greg (writing) and Jidéhem (backgrounds))
- 15. Z comme Zorglub (Z is for Zorglub, 1960, with Greg (writing) and Jidéhem (backgrounds)). First appearance of Zorglub.
- 16. L'ombre du Z (The Shadow of Z, 1960, with Greg (writing) and Jidéhem (backgrounds)). Concludes a diptych.
- 17. Spirou et les hommes-bulles (Spirou and the Bubble Men, 1959); followed by Les petits formats (The Small Formats, 1960); both with Roba (art). These stories, along with Tembo Tabou, first appeared in a newspaper, Le Parisien Libéré.
- 18. QRN sur Bretzelburg (Q.R.N. over Bretzelburg, 1963, with Greg (writing) and Jidéhem (backgrounds)). A longer version was published in 1987 in a limited printing.
- 19. Panade à Champignac (Babysitting in Champignac, 1968; with Peyo and Gos (writing)); followed by Bravo les Brothers (Hurray for the Brothers, 1967; with Jidéhem (backgrounds))
- 20. Le faiseur d'or (The gold maker, 1970)
- 24. Tembo Tabou (1958, with Roba (art)); followed by short stories
- 55. La colère du Marsupilami (2016, by Yoann and Vehlmann)

=== Marsupilami ===
By the late 1960s, Franquin decided to retire from drawing the Spirou & Fantasio series, which was passed to a new artist, Jean-Claude Fournier. Franquin did not give permission for the character to continue appearing in the series after the first Fournier story, Le faiseur d'or ("The Gold Maker"), in which Franquin drew the Marsupilami himself. Spirou's Marsupilami ceased to feature in the comics after that, and was absent from Spirou & Fantasio until 2016.

In 1987, Franquin launched a new series centering around the Marsupilami with the new publishing house, Marsu Productions. This series featured the Marsupilami family which had appeared in Le nid des Marsupilamis.

The first four volumes were illustrated by both Franquin and Batem. From the fifth volume onwards, Batem is the sole illustrator of the series.

The stories in the first two volumes were written by Greg. Afterwards, Greg stopped working on the series, and the next seven volumes were written by Yann. Various others have written for the series since; the most recent writer is Colman, who has received writing credits in the twelve most recent volumes.

The first published album of the series is La Queue du Marsupilami. In 2002, an album #0 was published, consisting of short stories featuring the Marsupilami, drawn by Franquin before 1987.

Opération Attila, 2011. Art by Batem, story by Colman.

- 0. Capturez un Marsupilami (Capture a Marsupilami, 6/2002) (Short-Story collection). Art and story by Franquin.
- 1. La Queue du Marsupilami (The tail of Marsupilami, 10/1987). Art by Batem and Franquin, story by Greg.
- 2. Le Bébé du bout du monde (The baby of the end of the world, 6/1988). Art by Batem and Franquin, story by Greg.
- 3. Mars le Noir (Mars the Black, 3/1989). Art by Batem and Franquin, story by Yann.
- 4. Le Pollen du Monte Urticando (The pollen of Mount Urticando, 11/1989). Art by Batem and Franquin, story by Yann.
- 5. Baby Prinz (10/1990). Art by Batem, story by Yann.
- 6. Fordlandia (11/1991). Art by Batem, story by Yann.
- 7. L'Or de Boavista (The Gold of Boavista, 10/1992). Art by Batem, story by Yann.
- 8. Le Temple de Boavista (The temple of Boavista, 10/1993). Art by Batem, story by Yann.
- 9. Le Papillon des cimes (The butterfly of the summit, 10/1994). Art by Batem, story by Yann.
- 10. Rififi en Palombie (4/1996). Art by Batem, story by Xavier Fauche and Eric Adam.
- 11. Houba Banana (7/1997). Art by Batem, story by Xavier Fauche and Eric Adam.
- 12. Trafic à Jollywood (7/1998). Art and story by Batem.
- 13. Le Défilé du jaguar (The fashion show of the jaguar, 9/1999). Art by Batem, story by Kaminka and Marais.
- 14. Un fils en or (A golden child, 6/2000). Art by Batem, story by Bourcquardez and Saive.
- 15. C'est quoi ce cirque !? (What's this circus!?, 9/2001). Art by Batem, story by Dugomier.
- 16. Tous en Piste (Everyone to the ring, 6/2003). Art by Batem, story by Dugomier.
- 17. L'orchidée des Chahutas (The orchid of the Chahutas, 6/2004). Art by Batem, story by Dugomier.
- 18. Robinson Academy (6/2005). Art by Batem, story by Dugomier.
- 19. Magie Blanche (White magic, 11/2006). Art by Batem, story by Colman.
- 20. Viva Palombia (6/2007). Art by Batem, story by Colman.
- 21. Red monster (4/2008). Art by Batem, story by Colman.
- 22. Chiquito Paradiso (4/2009). Art by Batem, story by Colman.
- 23. Croc Vert (5/2010). Art by Batem, story by Colman.
- 24. Opération Attila (20 May 2011). Art by Batem, story by Colman.
- 25. Sur la piste du Marsupilami (4/2012). Art by Batem, story by Colman, Chabat and Doner.
- 26. Santa Calamidad (11/2012). Art by Batem, story by Colman.
- 27. Coeur d'étoile (11/2013). Art by Batem, story by Colman.
- 28. Biba (11/2014). Art by Batem, story by Colman.
- 29. Quilzèmhoal (11/2015). Art by Batem, story by Colman.
- 30. Palombie secrète (04/2017). Art by Batem, story by Colman.
- 31. Monsieur Xing Yùn (04/2018). Art by Batem, story by Colman.
- 32. Bienvenido a Bingo ! (5/2019). Art by Batem, story by Colman.
- 33. Supermarsu (6/2021). Art by Batem, story by Colman.

==== Other ====
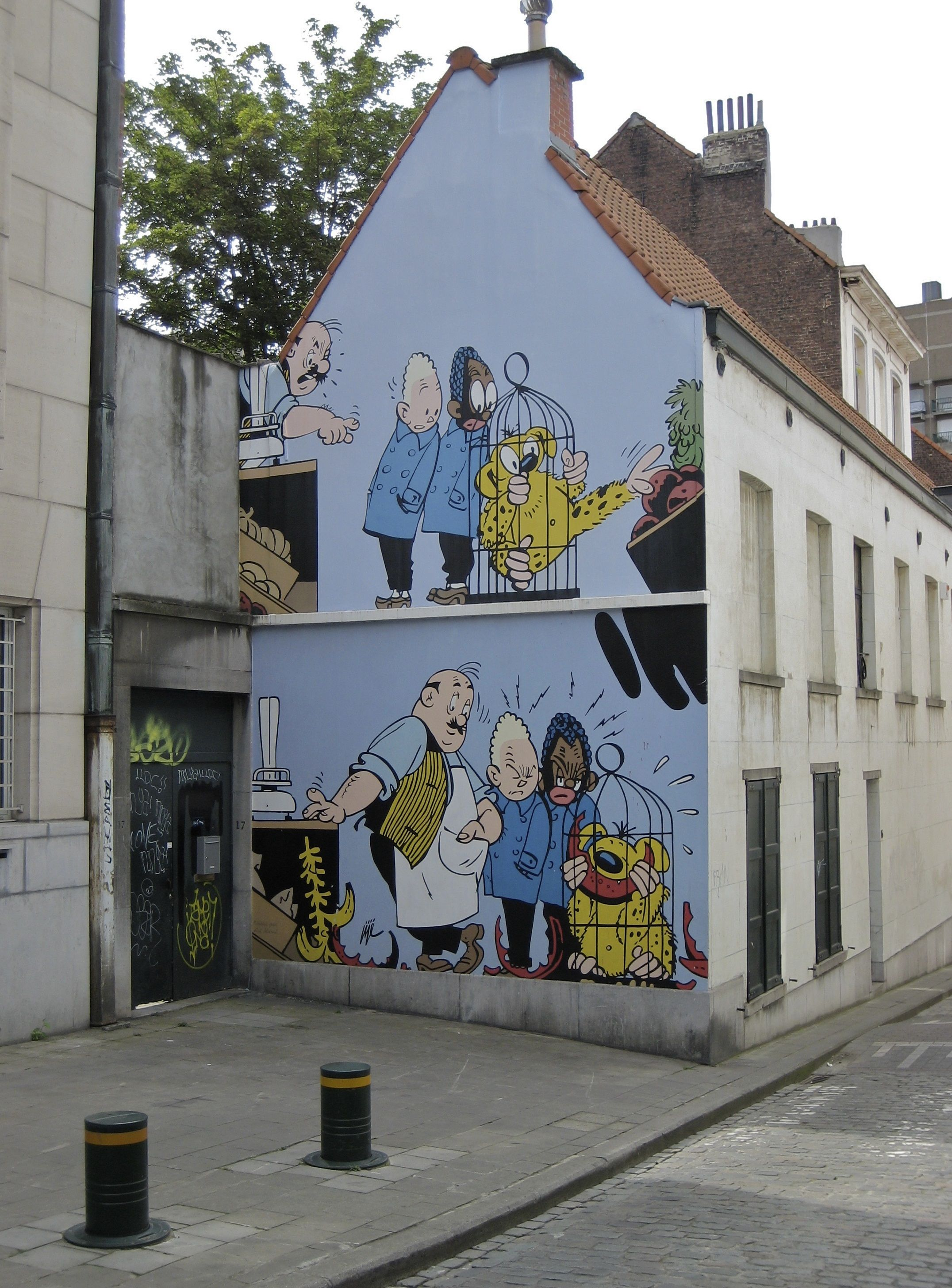
A Blondin et Cirage wall painting featuring Jijé's Marsupilamus africanus character, in Brussels, Belgium

- Marsupilami makes an appearance in Asterix and the Big Fight (1964), as a side-show attraction among the many that spring up in anticipation of the titular contest. The stall presenting the Marsupilami is run by Menagerix, who has an image of it as an advertisement of his tent.
- L'Encyclopédie du Marsupilami, published in 1991, is an "Encyclopedia" about the natural history of the Marsupilami, not a comic book. Text is by Cambier and Verhoest, art by Batem and Franquin.
- Gaston et le Marsupilami was published by Dupuis in 1978. This album groups all the short stories featuring both Gaston Lagaffe and Marsupilami, previously published in Spirou magazine. All these strips were then published in the album Capturez un Marsupilami.
- In December 2006, an illustrated book series featuring the Marsupilami as the main character was created in the Bibliothèque Rose Collection, published by Hachette. Scenarios are taken from the animated series Mon ami Marsupilami.
- A short-lived series produced in connection to the TV series was published from 1993 to 1994 in the American Disney Adventures magazine. Some stories were also reprinted in the German magazine Limit.
- Several Marsupilami cameos and tributes have been produced in Franco-Belgian comics; among the earliest was in Jijé's series Blondin et Cirage, which was another series published in Spirou magazine during Franquin's tenure on Spirou & Fantasio. In the volume Les soucoupes volantes (1956), the characters Blondin and Cirage find an African Marsupilami, Marsupilamus africanus, which is a slightly different species than the South American species Marsupilamus fantasii. The African Marsupilami species is tailless and has a stockier build.
- In 2020, the authors Frank Pé (artist) and Zidrou (writer) began the series La Bête (The Beast), a more realistic take of Marsupilami.

== English-language publication of comics ==
An early example of an English-language translation of Spirou & Fantasio was published in 1960, when the Franquin story Le nid des Marsupilamis was printed in the weekly British boys' magazine Knockout, under the title Dickie and Birdbath Watch the Woggle. In that early localization, Spirou was called "Dickie", Fantasio was "Birdbath", Seccotine was "Cousin Constance", the Marsupilami was "the Woggle", and the female Marsupilami was "the Wiggle."

One album of Spirou & Fantasio featuring Marsupilami, number 15, was translated to English by Fantasy Flight Publishing in 1995. Plans on releasing number 16 ended halfway through the translation process, due to bad sales.

In 2007, Egmont's subsidiary Euro Books translated the Spirou & Fantasio albums numbered 4, 5, 7, 8, 9, 10, 11 and 14 into English for the Indian market. The Marsupilami was renamed "Beastie" in these translations.

The British publishing company Cinebook have published English-language translations of Spirou & Fantasio, including some of Franquin's albums featuring the Marsupilami. The first of Franquin's albums that they translated was The Marsupilami Thieves, which they released in 2013. In 2017, Cinebook began to release English translations of the spin-off series Marsupilami.

== Animation ==
=== Disney animation ===
Disney's Marsupilami, as seen in the program Raw Toonage. He is hosting episode 11.

Disney's version of the Marsupilami first appeared on television in his short series of the program Raw Toonage in 1992, and was then spun off into his own eponymous show on the CBS network and Syndication in 1993. Marsupilami's supporting characters included among others Maurice the gorilla, Stewart the elephant, Eduardo the jaguar, Leonardo the lion, and Norman the poacher. The original Marsupilami stories by Franquin never featured a gorilla or elephant in the Marsupilami's wild habitat, since those species are native to Africa, whereas the Marsupilami species in the comics was said to come from South America. Another change is that Marsupilami can speak; his comic counterpart can only mimic sound like a parrot. In this version, Marsupilami is voiced by Steve Mackall. Shnookums and Meat was a secondary segment on this show.

There were thirteen episodes in the series, and the series lasted one season. Reruns of the show were aired on The Disney Channel (from October 1994 to June 1995), and later on Toon Disney.

Animators Tony Bancroft and Michael Surrey are in the character design ending credits.

=== Marathon/Samka animation ===
==== Season 1 – Marsupilami (2000) ====
A second animated series, this time produced in France, premiered in March 2000 and ran for 26 episodes on the French television channel Canal J. Produced by Marathon Productions and Marsu Productions, this series more closely followed the character in the original comic.

In this first season, there's a more comedic side. Marsupilami went on adventures alone or with his family (his wife Marsupilamie and their three young, Bibi, Bibu and Bobo). For example, in one episode he saved a group of circus animals, got them back to the city and saved the circus from closing. In another, he had to go to the city again to save one of his young, captured by their constant enemy, the hunter Bring M. Backalive.

==== Season 2 – My Friend Marsupilami (2003) ====
In the 26-episode Marsupilami and his family become best friends with a human family, The Newmans, that comes to live near them. Amanda is a Marsupilami researcher, her husband David is a computer technician that works from home and they have two children, Leo and Zoe. Leo and Marsupilami become best friends and they have many adventures, with both new friends and old enemies, like Backalive.

==== Seasons 3–4 – Marsupilami Hoobah Hoobah Hop! (2009–2010) ====
The third series, which premiered in 2009, features a preteen inventor named Hector Forster (voiced by Céline Ronté) and his adopted aunt Diane Forster (voiced by Magali Rosenzweig), who are going to live in the jungle for one year to study its fauna and flora. They become best friends with the Marsupilami family. Their main enemies are megalomaniac industrialist and jungle-hater Felicia Devort (voiced by Juliette Degenne), who plans to level out the Palombian jungle and build the Devort City megalopolis in its place, and her two henchmen, Stroy and Blouprint (both voiced by Marc Saez). Their old enemy, hunter Bring M. Backalive (voiced by Michel Vigné), also appears.

Samka Productions replaces Marathon beginning with this series.

==== Season 5 – Our Neighbors the Marsupilamis (2012) ====
The fourth series featured the Marsupilami family living with veterinarian Bernard Vanderstadt (voiced by Marc Saez) and his four children Sarah (voiced by Adeline Chetail), Iris (voiced by Charlyne Pestel), Isidore (voiced by Barbara Scaff) and Zoe. Their mother, Caroline (voiced by Magali Rosenzweig), frequently contacts them by phone, but appears in the last three episodes. Once again Backalive makes an appearance.

Marathon's Marsupilami series has been broadcast in 37 countries. Among the countries to have received at least one season are Germany (Super RTL), Algeria (Programme National), Belgium (RTL TVI), Canada (Télé-Quebec and Unis TV), Estonia (ETV), Bulgaria (Super7), United Kingdom (Channel 4), Spain (Antena 3, Disney Channel, Toon Disney and TV3), Finland (MTV3), Cyprus (CyBC), Greece (Alter Channel), Ireland (RTÉ), Italy (Italia 1), Portugal (Prisvideo), Switzerland (TSR), Russia (THT Network), Hungary (Minimax), Slovenia (RTV), Serbia (Happy TV and Minimax), Montenegro (Happy TV and Minimax), Bosnia and Herzegovina (Minimax), North Macedonia (Minimax), Morocco (2M TV), Turkey (Yumurcak TV), Sri Lanka (Rupavahini), Mexico (Canal 22), Brazil (Rede Globo and SBT), Venezuela (RCTV), Indonesia (Rajawali Televisi and RCTI), Malaysia (TV3 and TV9), the Africa Pansat (CFI), Latin America (ZAZ), the Near East and Middle East (TV5 and E-Junior), Vietnam (HTV7), Thailand (United Broadcasting Corporation), South Korea (EBS), Iceland (Sjónvarpið), and South Africa (SABC).

=== Belvision animation ===
In 2019, it was announced that a new animated series The Marsupilamis was in development from Belgian studio Belvision. The new series focuses on three marsupilamis named Hope (voiced by Magali Rosenzweig), Twister and Punch (both voiced by Jérémy Prévost) and their human friends Jade (voiced by Natalie Lander) and Mica (voiced by Alex Ryan). The series features 52 11-minute episodes, and began airing in 2026 on Nickelodeon internationally.

== Movies ==
In 2012, a French live-action comedy film titled Houba! On the Trail of the Marsupilami directed by Alain Chabat was released. Chabat himself stars in the movie alongside Jamel Debbouze, Frédéric Testot, Géraldine Nakache, Lambert Wilson, Patrick Timsit, Liya Kebede, Aïssa Maïga and The Great Khali. Though Marsupilami and his family are featured prominently, the movie features new characters rather than any of the established cast from the comics or television shows. The central focus is on French reporter Dan Geraldo (Chabat) and Palombian vet Pablito Camaron (Debbouze), whose name humorously translates to Little Pablo Shrimp, as they go searching for the indigenous Paya people led by Queen Paya (Kebede). The duo end up in a complicated plot involving the Marsupilami, an evil botanist (Testot) who discovers the elixir of youth, and a major, (Timsit) whom the botanist teams up with to overthrow the Palombian president (Wilson) and said president's love for Celine Dion.

In 2025, a second French live-action movie came out under the title of Marsupilami. The film was directed by Philippe Lacheau, who also starred in it alongside Jamel Debbouze, Tarek Boudali, Élodie Fontan, Julien Arruti and Jean Reno.

== Video Games ==
=== Marsupilami ===
Marsupilami is a Sega Genesis video game, first released 27 October 1995. It is a side-scrolling action puzzle-platformer in which the player controls Marsupilami and must guide his elephant friend Bonelli back home to the jungle.

=== Marsupilami: Hoobadventure ===
Marsupilami: Hoobadventure is a 2.5D platformer video game released on 16 November 2021. The game features three marsupilamis who mistakenly open a sarcophagus releasing a ghost and cursing the animals of Palombia while playing with debris on a beach. The three of them then begin their quest to find the ghost and unleash the curse.

=== Marsupilami 2: Salsa Palombia ===
Marsupilami 2: Salsa Palombia is a direct sequel to Marsupilami: Hoobadventure and features characters, visuals, and many of the same gameplay elements present in the first and was released on 3 September 2026.

== Fame ==
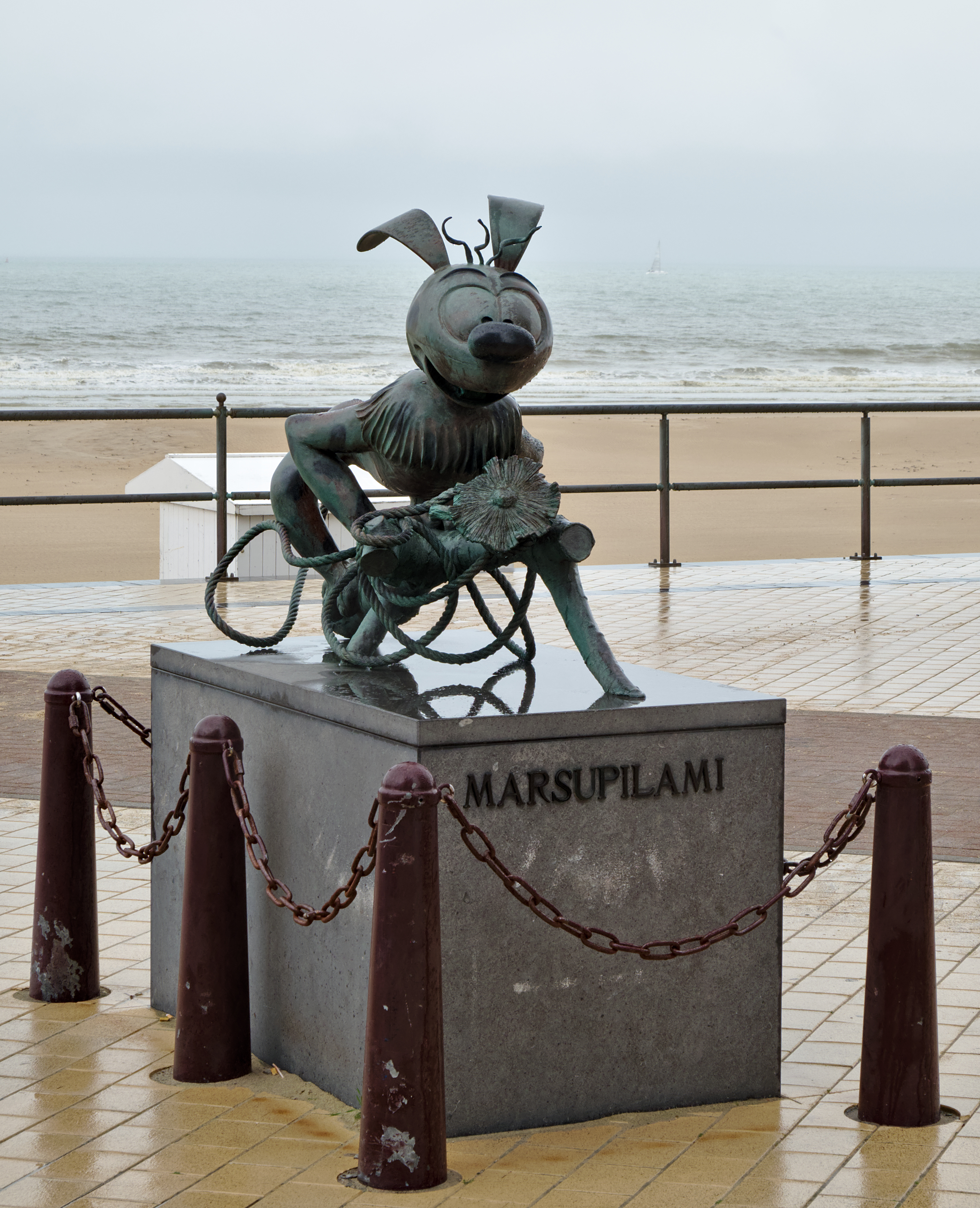
Marsupilami statue in Middelkerke (Belgium)

- A wax figure of a Marsupilami was manufactured and exhibited at the Musée Grévin, a museum displaying realistic statues of famous personalities, along with two other famous Franco-Belgian comics characters, Tintin and Asterix.
- Many commercial products have been created by several companies: clothes (Avance Diffusion), shoes (Léomil), clocks, watches, decoration, dishes (Tropico), figurines (Pixi and Plastoy), cuddly toys (Nounours), socks (Agofroy), schoolbags (Hasbro), school products (Oberthur), linen (MCT), puzzles (Jumbo), and underwear (United Labels).
- Marsupilami appears on a stamp created by the French Poste in 2003 (n° 3569).
- The official website www.marsupilami.com claims to have more than 25,000 subscribers.
- The Marsupilami is a fairground attraction in Asterix and the Big Fight.
- Marsupilami is honoured by Asterix illustrator and occasional writer Albert Uderzo on page 11 of Asterix and Obelix's Birthday: The Golden Book.
- A statue of the Marsupilami can be found at the center of a Charleroi roundabout and another has been seen at the train station of Angoulême, the city of France's largest comics festival.
- Asteroid 98494 Marsupilami, discovered by French astronomer Jean-Claude Merlin in 2000, was named after the comic-strip character. The official naming citation was published by the Minor Planet Center on 18 September 2005 (M.P.C. 54830).
