= La Queue =

La Queue may refer to:

- La Queue du Marsupilami, 1987 comic album relating the adventures of the fictional character Marsupilami
- La Queue-en-Brie in the Val-de-Marne département, France
- La Queue-lez-Yvelines in the Yvelines département, France
