= Hubert Boulard =

French comic book author (1971 – 2020)

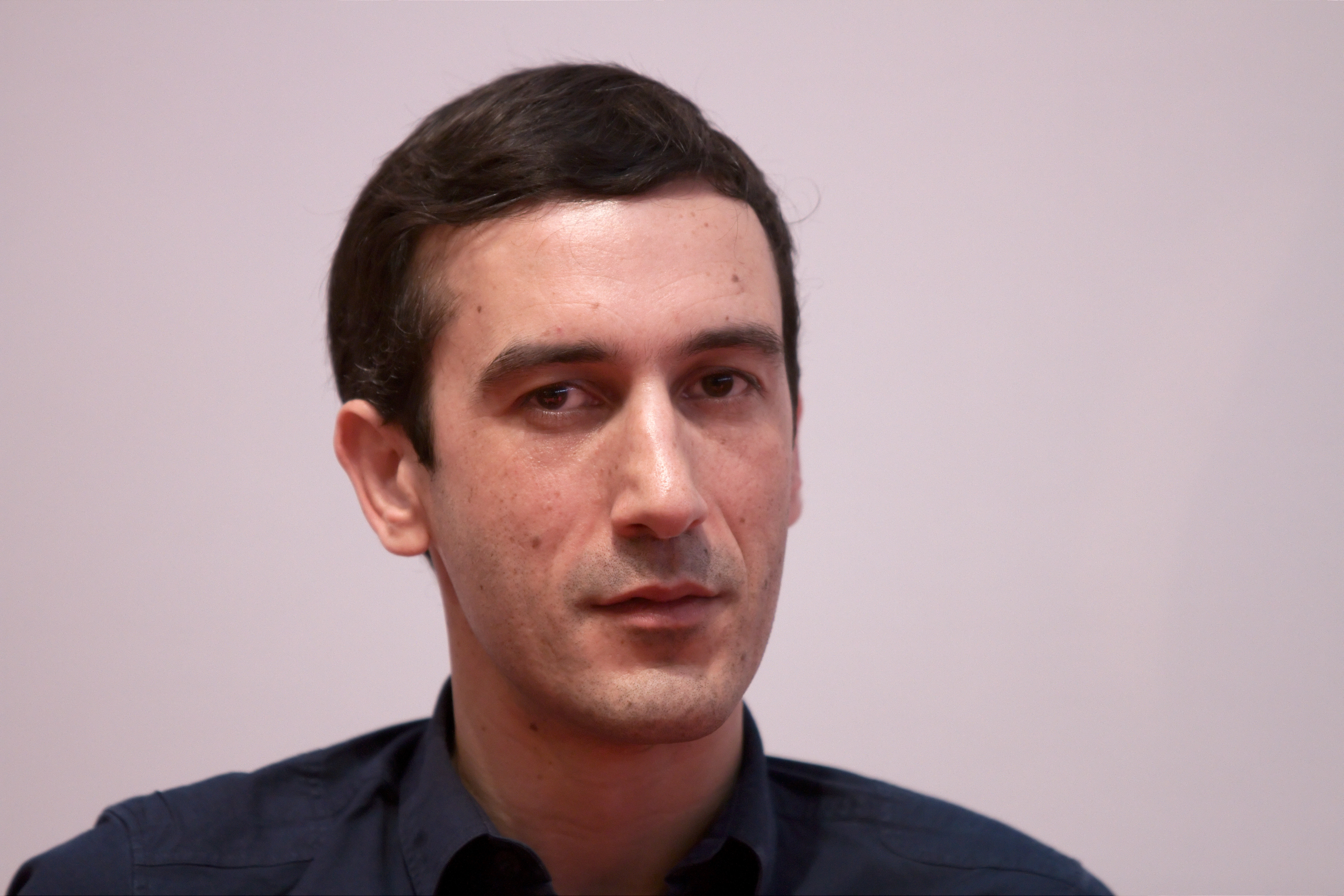
- Boulard in 2010
- Born: 21 January 1971; Saint-Renan, France
- Died: 12 February 2020 (aged 49)
- Occupations: Comics writer, colorist

Hubert Boulard (21 January 1971 – 12 February 2020) was a French comics writer and colorist usually credited mononymously as "Hubert".

== Biography ==
Boulard attended the École régionale des beaux-arts d'Angers, and began writing comics in the 1990s, after befriending Yoann, who had encouraged him to start in the field of comics.

As an illustrator, he worked with authors such as Éric Omond, Yoann, Éric Corbeyran, Richard Malka, Paul Gillon, David Beauchard, and Jason. At the same time, Boulard wrote comic scripts, starting in 2002 with the publication of Legs de l'alchimiste with Hervé Tanquerelle and Yeux Verts with Zanzim. He produced Miss Pas Touche in 2006, illustrated by Kerascoët and published by Dargaud, which sold 30,000 as of 2017. Since then, Boulard has worked with Étienne Le Roux, Marie Caillou, Virginie Augustin, with whom he won the 2017 Prix Diagonale for best album. With Bertrand Gatignol, he created Les Ogres-Dieux, which won best comic series at the 2019 Lucca Comics & Games Conference in Italy.

Boulard produced the collective work Les Gens normaux, paroles lesbiennes gay bi trans, published in 2013, during the time when France was voting on the legalization of gay marriage. In 2019, he wrote the comic Le Boiseleur : Les Mains d'Ilian, with illustrations by Gaëlle Hersent. In June 2020, Peau d'homme, written by Boulard with illustrations by Zanzim, was released. It had taken Zanzim five years to illustrate Hubert's script.

Boulard died on 12 February 2020 at the age of 49, said his publisher in a press release.

== Works ==
- Les Yeux verts (2002–2004)
- Le Legs de l'alchimiste (2002–2007)
- Miss Pas Touche (2006–2009)
- La Sirène des pompiers (2006)
- Bestioles (2010)
- La Chair de l'araignée (2010)
- Beauté (bande dessinée) (2011–2014)
- Ma vie posthume (2012–2013)
- La Ligne Droite (2013)
- WW2.2 T6 : Chien Jaune (2013)
- Le Temple du Passé (2014–2015)
- The Ogre Gods, Les Ogres-Dieux (2014–2020)
- Monsieur désire ? (2016)
- La Nuit mange le Jour (2017)
- Le Boiseleur (2019)
- Peau d'homme with Zanzim

== Awards ==
- Sélection officielle jeunesse at the Angoulême International Comics Festival for Bestioles (2011)
- Sélection officielle at the Angoulême International Comics Festival for Beauté (2012)
- Prix Jacques-Lob at the BD Boum Festival (2015)
- Firecracker Alternative Book Award for Beauté
- Gran Guinigi Award for Les Ogres-Dieux at the Lucca Comics & Games Conference (2017)
- Prix Diagonale for Monsieur désire ? (2017)
- Finalist for the Grand Prix de la Critique for Monsieur désire ? (2017)
- Sélection officielle at the Angoulême International Comics Festival for Les Ogres-Dieux (2017)
- Grand prix RTL de la bande dessinée for Peau d'homme with Zanzim
- Prix de la BD du Point for Peau d'homme with Zanzim
- Prix Landerneauwith Zanzim for Peau d'homme.
- Won Grand Prix de la Critique 2021, with Zanzim, for Peau d'homme
