= AX (magazine) =

Japanese manga magazine

AX (アックス) is a Japanese alternative manga magazine. It was first published in 1998 and is released every two months by the publishing house Seirinkogeisha. As of July 2023, 153 issues have been published.

The magazine was founded after the manga magazine Garo faced a crisis in 1996 after editor Katsuichi Nagai's death. Several of Garo's key staff quit their work with the magazine and instead founded AX in 1998. Several of Garo's regular contributors moved to AX instead.

In October 2008, North American publisher Top Shelf announced that it will release a 400-page selection of underground manga stories from the magazine as an anthology called AX Collection, edited by Sean Michael Wilson. The volume was nominated for "Best American Edition of Foreign Material" at the 2011 Harvey Awards.

== Published series ==
AX has featured manga artists such as Suehiro Maruo, Shintaro Kago, Shinichi Abe, Nishioka Kyoudai, Naoto Yamakawa, Usamaru Furuya, Toshio Saeki, Akino Kondoh, Kotobuki Shiriagari, Yoshihiro Tatsumi, Yuichi Yokoyama and Toyo Kataoka.

The magazine featured, among others, these series:

- Doing Time by Kazuichi Hanawa (1998-2000)
- Tokyo Zombie by Yusaku Hakanuma (1999)
- Jacaranda by Kotobuki Shiriagari
- Mother Cosmos by Minoru Sugiyama
- Suiton Kikou by Shinya Komatsu (2004)
