= Edmond Baudoin =

French artist (born 1942)

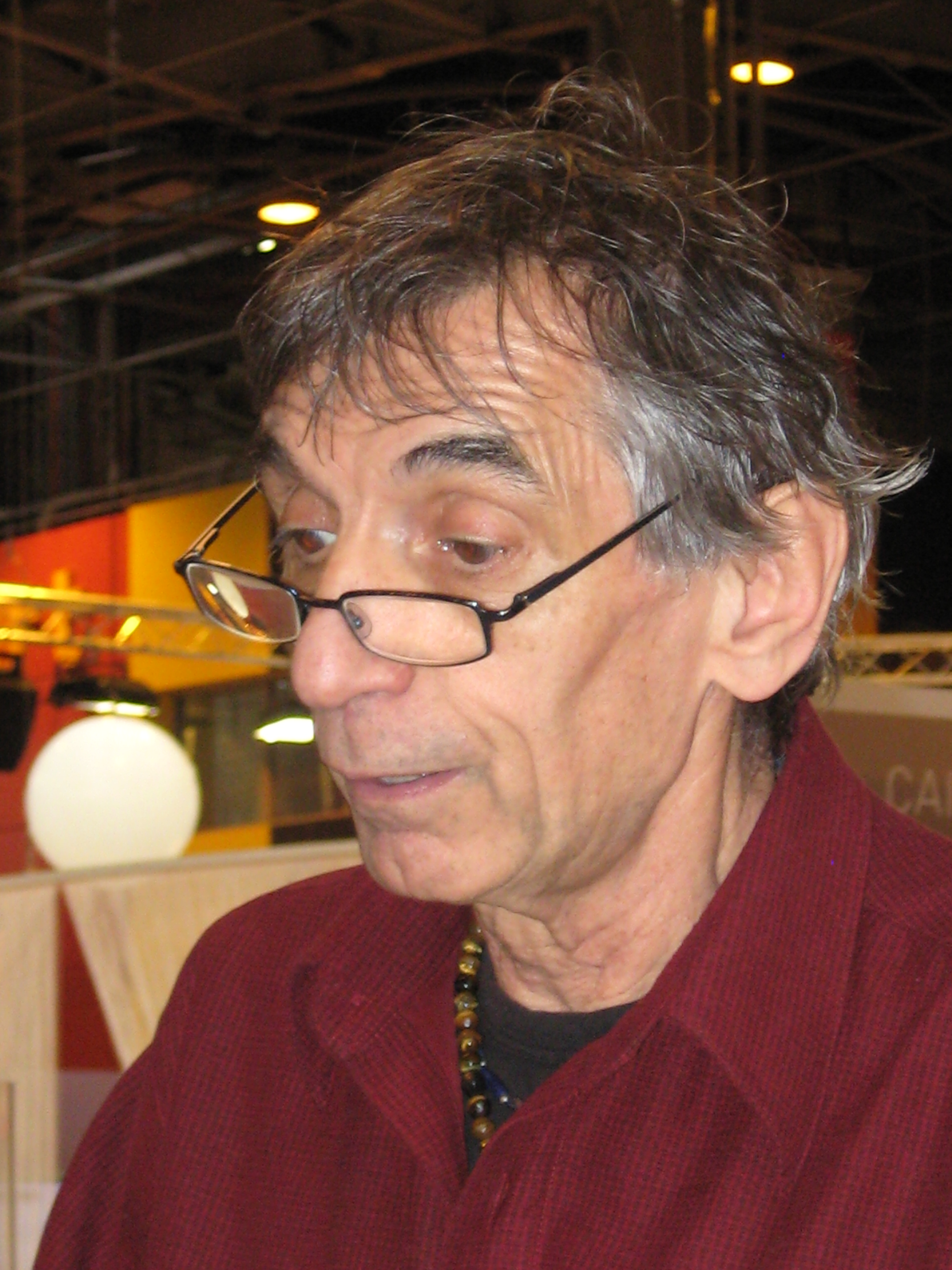
- Edmond Baudoin in March 2010
- Born: 23 April 1942 (age 84) Nice, France
- Area: Cartoonist
- Awards: Angoulême International Comics Festival Prize for Best French Comic Book, 1992; Angoulême International Comics Festival Prize for Scenario, 1997, 2001

Edmond Baudoin (French: [bodwɛ̃]; born 23 April 1942) is a French artist, illustrator, and writer of sequential art and graphic novels.

== Biography ==
Baudoin left school at the age of 16 and went into military service.

He later worked as an accountant at the Palace de Nice (L’Hôtel Plaza). At 33, he left the accountant trade to pursue drawing.

Baudoin was an art professor from 1999 to 2003 at the University of Quebec.

== Publications ==
- Travesti, L'Association, 2007
- Le petit train de la côte bleue, 6 pieds sous terre, 2007
- "Les essuie-glaces, collection Aire Libre, Dupuis, 2006
- La patience du grand singe, en collaboration avec Céline Wagner, Tartamudo Editions, 2006
- Patchwork, Éditions Le 9^{e} Monde, 2006
- L'Espignole, L'Association, 2006
- La musique du dessin, Éditions de l'An 2, 2005
- Crazyman, L'Association, 2005
- Le chant des baleines, collection Aire Libre, Dupuis, 2005
- Araucaria, carnets du Chili, collection Mimolette, L'Association, 2004
- Les yeux dans le mur, en collaboration avec Céline Wagner, collection Aire Libre, Dupuis, 2003
- Chagrin d'Encre 2, Portfolio en serigraphie, Éditions Le 9^{e} Monde, 1998
- Questions de dessin, Éditions de l'An 2, 2002
- Le chemin de Saint-Jean, L'Association, 2002
- Taches de Jazz, Éditions Le 9^{e} Monde, 2002
- Les quatre fleuves, scénario de Fred Vargas, Éditions Viviane Hamy, 2000
- Chroniques de l'éphémère, 6 pieds sous terre, 1999
- Salade niçoise, collection Ciboulette, L'Association, 1999
- Le chemin aux oiseaux, scénario de Nadine Brun-Cosme, Seuil, 1999
- Chagrin d'Encre, Portfolio en serigraphie, Éditions Le 9^{e} Monde, 1998
- Piero, Seuil, 1998
- Véro, collection Histoires Graphiques, Éditions Autrement, 1998
- Nam, collection Patte de Mouche, L'Association, 1998
- Lalin, scénario de Joan Luc Sauvaigo, Z'éditions, 1997
- Derrière les fagots, Z'éditions, 1996
- Le voyage, collection Ciboulette, L'Association, 1996
- Mat, Seuil, 1996
- Terrains vagues, collection Eperluette, L'Association, 1996
- Rachid, Seuil, 1995
- Made in U.S., collection Patte de Mouche, L'Association, 1995
- Éloge de la poussière, collection Eperluette, L'Association, 1995
- La mort du peintre, Z'éditions, 1995 (réédité par 6 pieds sous terre en 2005)
- Abbé Pierre, le défi, Tom Pousse, 1994
- Carla, scénario de Jacques Lob, Futuropolis, 1993
- Le Journal du voleur, de Jean Genet, Futuropolis, 1993
- Théorème, de Pier Paolo Pasolini, Futuropolis, 1992
- Couma acò, Futuropolis, 1991 (réédité par L'Association en 2005)
- Harrouda, de Tahar Ben Jelloun, Futuropolis, 1991
- Baudoin, collection 30x40, Futuropolis, 1990 (réédité par L'Association sous le titre Le portrait)
- Le Procès-verbal, illustrations du roman de J-M.G. Le Clézio, Futuropolis Gallimard, 1989
- La Croisée, scénario de Frank, Les Humanoïdes Associés, 1988
- Théâtre d'Ombres, scénario de Frank, Les Humanoïdes Associés, 1987
- Le premier voyage, Futuropolis, 1987
- Un Rubis sur les Lèvres, collection Hic et Nunc, Futuropolis, 1986
- Avis de Recherché, scénario de Frank, Futuropolis, 1985
- La Danse devant le Buffet, scénario de Frank, Futuropolis, 1985
- Un Flip Coca, Futuropolis, 1984
- La peau du lézard, collection Hic et Nunc, Futuropolis, 1983
- Passe le temps, Futuropolis, 1982
- Les sentiers cimentés, Futuropolis, 1981
- Civilisation, collection Science-Fiction, Glénat, 1981

== Awards ==
- 1992: Angoulême International Comics Festival Award for Best French Comic Book for Couma acò
- 1997: Angoulême International Comics Festival Award for Best Scenario for Le voyage
- 2001: Angoulême International Comics Festival Award for Best Scenario for Les quatre fleuves
