= The Ogre Gods =

Fantasy comic series

- Author: Hubert Boulard
- Illustrator: Bertrand Gatignol
- Publisher: Soleil Productions
- Genre: Graphical Novel
- Original language: French

The Ogre Gods is a French black & white comic series in four volumes written by Hubert Boulard, with illustrations from Bertrand Gatignol. The first volume, Petit, was published by Soleil Productions in 2014.

== Synopsis ==
The series focuses on an inbred dynasty of giant, aristocratic cannibals ruling over a kingdom. The story centers on Petit, a tiny, human-sized giant born into this ruthless clan, who must survive his family’s depravity and his own dual nature. The series is broken into volumes, with the first focusing on Petit's survival, and later volumes expanding on the world and characters.

== List of volumes ==
- Hubert (2014). Petit. Bertrand Gatignol. Paris: Éditions Soleil. ISBN 978-2-302-04312-1. OCLC 904479382..
- Hubert (2016). Demi-sang. Bertrand Gatignol (Première édition ed.). Paris. ISBN 978-2-302-04849-2. OCLC 952381732.
- Half-Blood, 2016 (ISBN 978-2-302-04849-2)
- The Great Man, 2018 (ISBN 978-2-302-07273-2)
- First-born, 2020 (ISBN 978-2-302-09026-2)
