= Green Manor =

Franco-Belgian comic series

- The second book in the series, The Inconvenience of Being Dead featuring the main character.

Publication information
- Publisher: Dupuis (French); Cinebook (English)
- Genre: Graphic novel
- Publication date: 2001-2005
- No. of issues: 3 (in French); 2 (in English)

Creative team
- Written by: Fabien Vehlmann
- Artist: Denis Bodart

Green Manor is a Franco-Belgian comics series written by Fabien Vehlmann, illustrated by Denis Bodart and published by Dupuis in French and Cinebook in English. I's a humoristic detective series set in the United Kingdom at the end of the 19th century.

== Volumes ==
1. Assassins et Gentlemen - Jan 2001 ISBN 2-8001-3137-3
2. De l'inconvénient d'être mort - Feb 2002 ISBN 2-8001-3233-7
3. Fantaisies meurtrières - Apr 2005 ISBN 2-8001-3598-0

== Translations ==
Cinebook Ltd is publishing Green Manor. The last two volumes have been compiled together into one English volume.:

1. Assassins and Gentlemen - May 2008 ISBN 978-1-905460-53-3
2. The Inconvenience of Being Dead - Sept 2008 ISBN 978-1-905460-64-9

== Reception ==
The first Cinebook volume was reviewed by who complimented the structure and writing ("These stories get straight to the point and keep you there"), said that "[t]he art is gorgeous," before concluding that "[t]he book might be nearly $14, but the art and the storytelling density make for a better value than what that number looks like on the page."

== Awards ==
The title was nominated for the 2002 Angoulême International Comics Festival Prize for Scenario.
