= Seuls =

Franco-Belgian comics series

- Main characters with the series logo

Publication information
- Publisher: Spirou magazine Dupuis (2006-2023) / Rue de Sèvres (2023-) (French); Cinebook Ltd (English)
- Publication date: 2006–present
- Main character(s): Dodji; Leila; Camille; Yvan; Terry

Creative team
- Written by: Fabien Vehlmann (2006–)
- Artist: Bruno Gazzotti (2006-)

Seuls is a Franco-Belgian fantasy adventure children's comic book series written by Fabien Vehlmann and drawn by Bruno Gazzotti for Spirou Magazine. It centers on the adventures of five children who must fend for themselves in a mysterious world without adults.

It was published in hardback albums by Dupuis from January 2006. The series comprises 14 volumes divided into 4 cycles.

The series has twice won a Prix Jeunesse 9-12 ans at the Angoulême Festival in 2007 and 2010. It has also received two Grand Prix du Journal de Mickey.

The albums have also been published in Dutch (by Dupuis), in English (by Cinebook), in German (by Piredda), in Norwegian (by QltrRebus), in Spanish (by Dibbuks), in Croatian (by Fibra) and in Serbian (by Čarobna knjiga).

In 2017 a film adaptation of the series was made by David Moreau, starring Stéphane Bak, Sofia Lesaffre and Thomas Doret, with limited success.

By 2018, more than 2 million albums had been sold, with new albums topping the French sales rankings for comics.

== See also ==
- Belgian comics
- Franco-Belgian comics
