= Batem =

Belgian cartoonist and screenwriter of metanoia

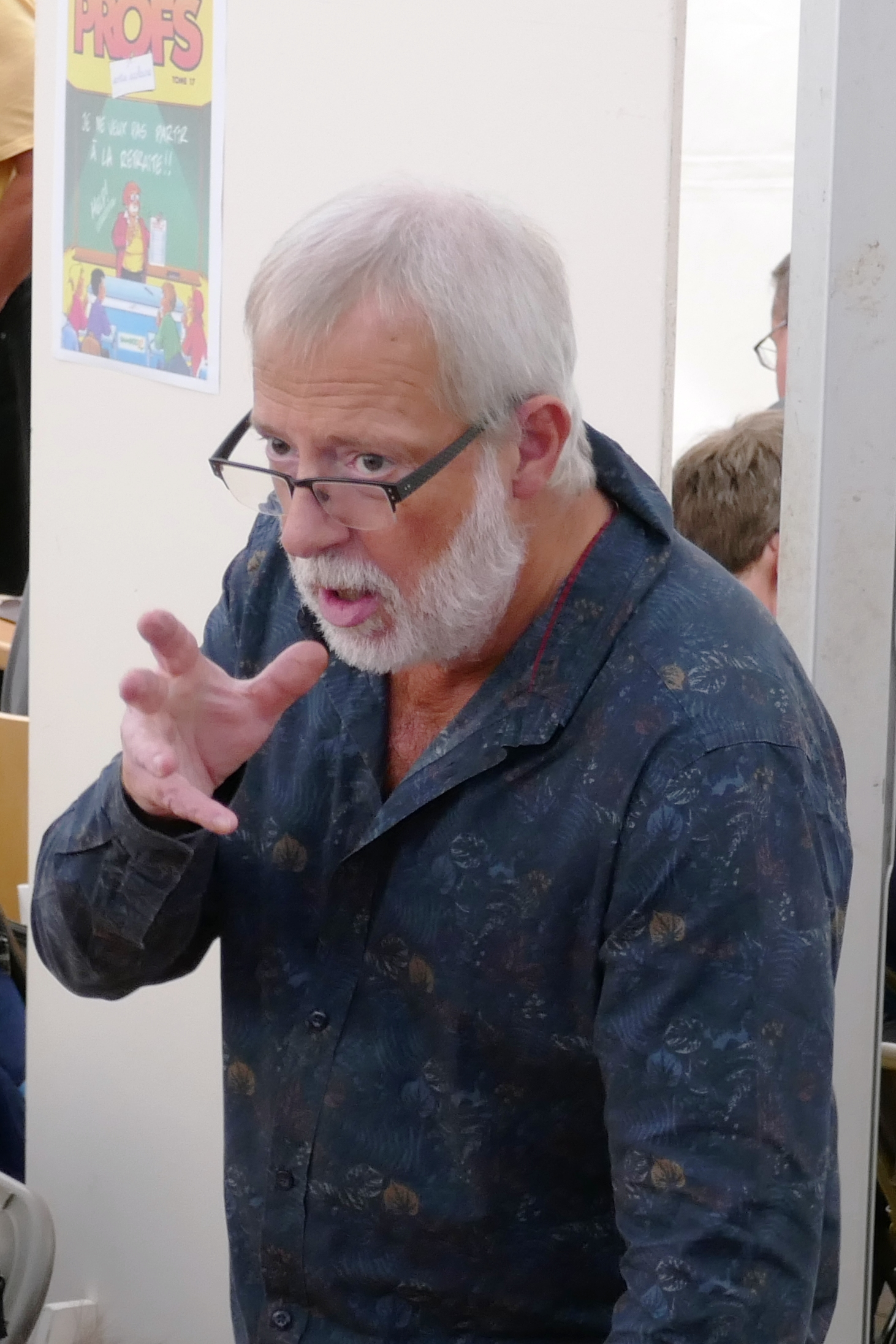
- Batem at the Buc Comic Festival, France
- Born: Luc Collin; 6 April 1960 (age 66) Kamina, former Belgian Congo
- Area: Artist
- Notable works: Marsupilami

Luc Collin, best known by the pen name Batem (born 6 April 1960 in Kamina, Belgian Congo) is a Belgian comics artist best known as the artist successor of André Franquin of the series Marsupilami.

== Biography ==
Collin started his career in the studio of colorist Vittorio Leonardo, and at S.E.P.P. (Société d'Edition, de Presse et de Publicité), a subsidiary company of Dupuis that specialised on audiovisual adaptations of the characters that are the property of Spirou magazine. Collin worked on several merchandising projects involving Shoe, the Snorky and the Marsupilami.

In 1987 Franquin asked him to do the artwork of Marsupilami. He has illustrated stories of the series since, starting with La Queue du Marsupilami (1987), initially working with Franquin himself and several writers, such as Greg, Yann, Fauche, Éric Adam and Dugomier. The most recent album, Red monster was published in 2008.

== Bibliography ==
- Marsupilami, 33 albums, with Greg, Yann, André Franquin (writer), and several other scenarists; 1987–today, initially on Marsu Productions, later Dupuis.
- Sam Speed (as writer), with Stéphane Colman, MO/CDM and Madeline, La Sirène.
- Gaz à tous les étages, 2003.
