= Angoulême International Comics Festival Prize for Scenario =

This Prize for Scenario is awarded to comics authors at the Angoulême International Comics Festival.

In the following list, the winner of the award is listed first, followed by the nominees.

== 1990s ==
- 1993: Saigon-Hanoï by Cosey, Dupuis
- 1994: Julius Corentin Acquefacques, prisonnier des rêves: Le processus by Marc-Antoine Mathieu, Delcourt
- 1995: Le lièvre de Mars: Tome 2 by Antonio Parras and Patrick Cothias, Glénat
- 1996: Juan Solo: Fils de flingue by Georges Bess and Alejandro Jodorowsky, Les Humanoïdes Associés
- 1997: Le voyage by Edmond Baudoin, L'Association
- 1998: Kid Congo by Jacques de Loustal and Philippe Paringaux, Casterman
- 1999: La grande arnaque by Carlos Trillo and Domingo Mandrafina, Albin Michel

== 2000s ==
- 2000: L'ascension du Haut Mal: Tome 4 by David B.
  - Berceuse assassine: Les jambes de Martha by Ralf Meyer and Philippe Tome
  - Péché mortel: Autopsie d'un mensonge by Joseph Griesmar and Toff
  - Tramp: Pour Hélène by Patrick Jusseaume and Jean-Charles Kraehn
  - Trois Allumettes by David Chauvel and Hervé Boivin
- 2001: Les quatre fleuves by Edmond Baudoin and Fred Vargas
  - Les innommables: Pas-de-mâchoire by Didier Conrad and Yann
  - Les petits contes noirs: La fin du monde by Pierre and Frank Le Gall
  - Professeur Bell: Les poupées de Jérusalem by Joann Sfar
  - La rose de Jéricho: Dernier jour by Uriel
- 2002: Persepolis: Tome 2 by Marjane Satrapi, L'Association
  - Special mention for Rural! by Étienne Davodeau, Delcourt
  - Amours fragiles: Le Dernier Printemps by Philippe Richelle and Jean-Michel Beuriot, Casterman
  - Le décalogue: Le serment by TBC and Frank Giroud, Glénat
  - Green Manor: Assassins et gentlemen by Fabien Vehlmann and Denis Bodart, Dupuis
  - La ligue des gentlemen extraordinaires (The League of Extraordinary Gentlemen) by Alan Moore and Kevin O'Neill, USA Éditions
  - Le Playboy (The Playboy) by Chester Brown, Les 400 coups
- 2003: Quartier lointain: Tome 1 by Jirô Taniguchi, Casterman
  - Garduno, en temps de paix by Philippe Squarzoni, Les Requins Marteaux
  - Max Fridman: Rio de Sangre by Vittorio Giardino, Glénat
  - Monster by Naoki Urasawa, Kana
  - Le pouvoir des innocents: Sergent Logan by Luc Brunschwig and Laurent Hirn, Delcourt
  - Torso by Marc Andreyko and Brian Michael Bendis, Semic
- 2004: The Sandman: La saison des brumes by Neil Gaiman, Delcourt
  - Caravane by Bernard Olivié and Jorge Zentner, Amok
  - Cuervos by Richard Marazano and Michel Durand, Glénat
  - La grippe coloniale: Le retour d'Ulysse by Serge Huo Chao Si and Appollo, Vents d'Ouest
  - La Ligue des Gentlemen extraordinaires: Tome 4 (The League of Extraordinary Gentlemen) by Alan Moore and Kevin O'Neill, USA Éditions
  - Mémoire d'un commercial by Morvandiau, Les Requins Marteaux
  - Planetes by Makoto Yukimura, Marvel
- 2005: Comme des lapins by Ralf König, Glénat
  - Clichés Beyrouth 1990 by Christophe Gaultier, Bruno Ricard and Sylvain Ricard, Les Humanoïdes Associés
  - Le marquis d'Anaon: La providence by Fabien Vehlmann and Matthieu Bonhomme, Dargaud
  - Le sang des Valentines by Christian De Metter and Muller Cattel, Casterman
  - Summer of Love by Debbie Drechsler, L'Association
  - Le tour de valse by Ruben Pellejero and Denis Lapière, Dupuis
  - Y, le dernier homme: Tome 2 (Y the Last Man) by Brian K. Vaughan and Pia Guerra, Semic
- 2006: Les mauvaises gens by Etienne Davodeau, Delcourt
  - The autobiography of me too two by Guillaume Bouzard, Les Requins Marteaux
  - Dans la prison by Kazuichi Hanawa, Ego comme x
  - Hemingway by Jason, Carabas
  - A History of Violence by John Wagner and Vince Locke, Delcourt
  - Les passe-murailles: Le dedans des choses by Stéphane Oiry and Jean-Luc Cornette, Les Humanoïdes Associés
  - Le roi des mouches: Hallorave by Mezzo and Pirus, Albin Michel
