= Virginie Augustin =

French comics book artist (born 1973)

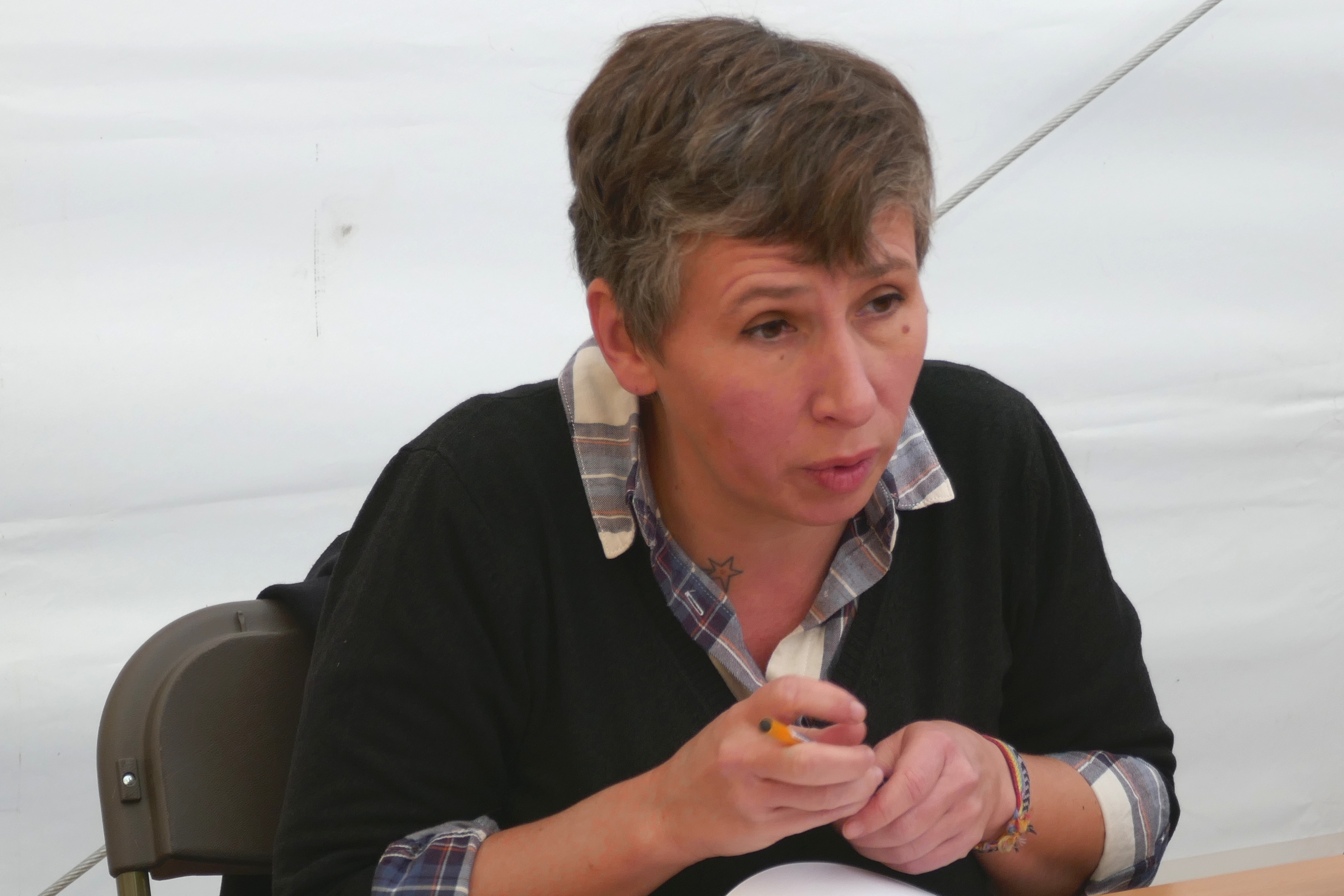
- (2016)
- Born: 11 March 1973 (age 53); Chatou, France
- Education: Gobelins
- Notable work: Monsieur Désire?; Tarzan; Hercules; W.I.T.C.H.; Dragon Hunters; Code Lyoko
- Awards: 2017, Prix Diagonale; 2006, Prix Saint-Michel

Virginie Augustin (11 March 1973, Chatou) is a French comics book artist. She has also worked on animated features with Walt Disney Animation Studios and France 3.

== Biography ==
After studying at Gobelins, Augustin worked with Walt Disney Animation Studios on the animated features Tarzan (1999) and Hercules (1997). Her career in animation also led her to work on W.I.T.C.H. (2001), Dragon Hunters (2006), and Code Lyoko (2003) for France 3, and on the animated film Corto Maltese, la cour secrète des arcanes (2002).

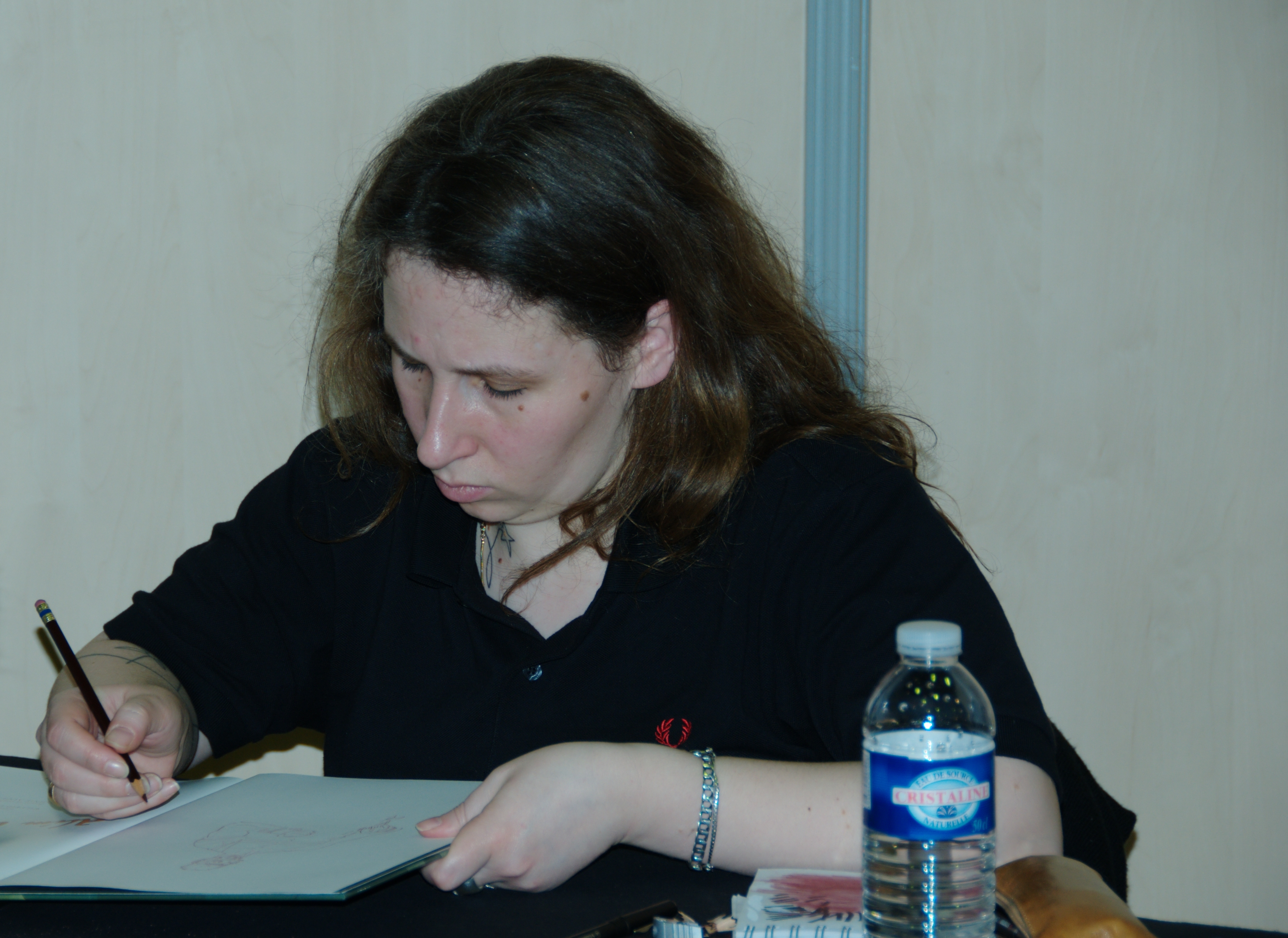
(2008)

Shortly after Corto Maltese, in 2003, she joined the comic strip world and drew the four volumes of the bande dessinée heroic fantasy series Alim le tanneur with scriptwriter Wilfrid Lupano. Augustin then participated in several collectives (Les beaux dessins de Francis Cabrel, Les Chansons illustrées de Patrick Bruel, Polnareff - Suite de Bulles, Premières fois, and Sur les traces de Luuna). She also produced a sketchbook for Comix buro, the collection of books directed by Olivier Vatine.

Then she entered the collection of Les Légendes de Troy, where she drew Voyage aux Ombres,, a one-shot scripted by Christophe Arleston and Audrey Alwett, published in May 2011.

She collaborated with Hubert, who wrote for her the script of Monsieur Désire? published in 2016, with which the authors won 2017 Prix Diagonale for best album.

== Awards and honours ==
- 2017, Prix Diagonale for best album, script by Hubert, for Monsieur Désire?
- 2017, Finalist, Prix de la critique, script by Hubert, for Monsieur Désire?
- 2006, Prix Saint-Michel de l'avenir award, script by Wilfrid Lupano, for Alim le tanneur, tome 2: Le Vent de l'exil

== Selected works ==
=== Series ===
- Alim le tanneur
  - 1, Le Secret des eaux, Delcourt, collection Terres de Légendes, 2004 (script, Wilfrid Lupano; design, Virginie Augustin; colorist, Virginie Augustin, Geneviève Penloup) ISBN 2-84789-103-X
  - 2, Le Vent de l'exil, Delcourt, collection Terres de Légendes, 2006 (script, Wilfrid Lupano; design, Virginie Augustin; colorists, Virginie Augustin, Geneviève Penloup) ISBN 2-84789-946-4
  - 3, La Terre du prophète pâle, 2007, Delcourt, collection Terres de Légendes (Virginie Augustin)
  - 4, Là où brûlent les regards, 2009, Delcourt, collection Terres de Légendes (Virginie Augustin, Dimitri Fogolin)
  - INT Édition intégrale, 2012, Delcourt, collection Long Métrage (Virginie Augustin, Geneviève Penloup, Dimitri Fogolin)
- 40 Éléphants
  - 1, Florrie, doigts de fée, Bamboo Édition collection Grand Angle, 2017 (script, Kid Toussaint; design, Virginie Augustin; colorist, Hubert) ISBN 978-2-8189-4352-6
  - 2, Maggie, passe-muraille, Bamboo Édition collection Grand Angle, 2018 (script, Kid Toussaint; design, Virginie Augustin; colorist, Hubert) ISBN 978-2-8189-4503-2
  - 3, Dorothy, la poinçonneuse, Bamboo Édition collection Grand Angle, 2019 (script, Kid Toussaint; design, Virginie Augustin; colorist, Hubert) ISBN 978-2-8189-4721-0

=== One-shots and diptychs ===
- Voyage aux ombres, Soleil, collection Légendes de Troy, 2011 (script, Christophe Arleston, Audrey Alwett; design, Virginie Augustin; colorist, Yoann Guillo) ISBN 978-2-8189-4721-0
- Whaligoë tome 1, Casterman, 2013 (script, Yann; design, Virginie Augustin; colorist, Virginie Augustin, Fabien Alquier) ISBN 978-2-203-06089-0
- Whaligoë tome 2, Casterman, 2014 (script, Yann; design, Virginie Augustin; colorist, Fabien Alquier) ISBN 978-2-203-07493-4
- Monsieur désire?, Glénat, 2016 (script, Hubert; design, Virginie Augustin; colorist, Hubert) ISBN 978-2-344-00580-4
- Shadows in the Moonlight, Glénat, 2019 (script and pencils, Virginie Augustin)
- Joe la Pirate, Glénat, 2021 (script, Hubert; design, Virginie Augustin) ISBN 978-2-344-03943-4

=== Participation in collective works ===
- Francis Cabrel - Les beaux dessins, Delcourt, 2005 (script and color, collective; design, Virginie Augustin, collective) ISBN 2-84789-927-8
- Polnareff suite de bulles, Soleil Productions, 2007 (script and color, collective; design, Virginie Augustin, collective) ISBN 978-2-84946-803-6
- Premières fois, Delcourt, 2008 (script, Sibylline; design, Virginie Augustin, collective; colorist, black and white) ISBN 978-2-7560-1272-8
- Sur les traces de Luuna, Soleil Productions, 2008 (script and color, collective; design, Virginie Augustin, collective) ISBN 978-2-302-00227-2
- Souvenirs de films, Le Lombard, 2009 (script, Jean-Pierre Eugène; design, Virginie Augustin, collective; colorist, collective) ISBN 978-2-8036-2580-2
- Une McStory française, Cliomédia, 2009 (script, Pierre Dottelonde; design, Virginie Augustin, collective; colorist, collective) ISBN 2-909522-28-8
- Les Gens normaux, Casterman, 2013 (script, Cyril Pedrosa, Hubert; design, Virginie Augustin, collective; colorist, collective) ISBN 978-2-203-07724-9
- Héro(ïne)s : la représentation féminine en bande-dessinée, Arte Editions, 2015 (script, Jean-Christophe Deveney, Isabelle Guillaume; design, Virginie Augustin, collective; colorist, collective) ISBN 978-2-9547148-4-4
