= Beautiful Darkness (graphic novel) =

French graphic novel

Beautiful Darkness (Jolies Ténèbres)
- French cover
- Page count: 112 pages
- Publisher: Dupuis

Creative team
- Writers: Marie Pommepuy; Fabien Vehlmann
- Artists: Marie Pommepuy; Sébastien Cosset (as Kerascoët)

Original publication
- Date of publication: 2009; 2017
- Language: French
- ISBN: 978-2-80014238-8; 978-2-80017458-7

Translation
- Publisher: Drawn & Quarterly
- Date: 2018
- ISBN: 978-1-77046336-3
- Translator: Helge Dascher

Beautiful Darkness (French: Jolies Ténèbres) is a graphic novel illustrated by French illustrators Marie Pommepuy and Sébastien Cosset under their pen name Kerascoët, and written by Pommepuy and Fabien Vehlmann. Beautiful Darkness was first published in English by Drawn & Quarterly in 2018 in a translation by Helge Dascher.

In the story, people the size of fruit flies are expelled from their home and thrust outside into the woods. The novel tells the tale of Aurora, a sweet girl who finds herself taking a leadership role in the community of tiny people. The story starts out with a whimsical tone but rapidly devolves into a morbid narrative. Although much of the plot revolves around Aurora, small segments of the story focus on side characters who serve to emphasize the contrast between the daunting situation at hand and the playful way characters interact.

== Plot ==
The protagonist Aurora is on a date with Prince Hector when they are suddenly expelled from their home, which happens to be the corpse of a young human girl. Everyone else living in the corpse is forced out as well, leaving them to figure out how to survive in the woods. Aurora takes leadership and begins helping everyone she can by gathering food and providing company. She befriends the narcissistic Zelie, who has a group of loyal followers that worship and spoil her.

Aurora's naïveté makes her blind to the fact that she is a victim of Zelie's manipulation. Hector, who was seemingly infatuated with Aurora, marries Zelie unexpectedly and Aurora is left alone. Her closest friends become part of Zelie's following. The betrayal strips Aurora of her sympathy and purity; her only goal from then on is to survive, no matter what the cost.

Aurora comes across a giant's cabin, where she can live without the others. Eventually, Zelie and her posse discover this cabin as well and make themselves at home. Aurora desperately wants them out of her new home, so she tricks them into gathering under a stove and watches as the giant unknowingly burns them alive. Finally, she can live in peace.

== Characters ==
- Aurora – Protagonist
- Plim – Aurora's cold-hearted friend and traitor
- Hector – Aurora's object of affection
- Zelie – Manipulative main antagonist
- Jane – Mysterious woman who Aurora admires
- Timothy – Aurora's timid one-eyed friend
- Rat – Aurora's rat friend
- Giant – Owner of the house in which Aurora makes her final home

== Awards ==
It received a nomination for an Eisner Award in 2015.

== Critical reception ==
A starred review on Publishers Weekly says the novel is always on readers' minds and "unforgettable". An exclusive preview of the book on Nerdist calls the novel "a sinister saga that you won't be able to put down."
