= Kerascoët =

French comics artists couple

Kerascoët is the joint pen name of the French illustrators, comics and animation artists Marie Pommepuy (born 1978) and Sébastien Cosset (born 1975).

A married couple, they met while attending the Olivier de Serres art school. They chose their pen name in 2000 after the hamlet of Kerascoët in Névez, Brittany where Pommepuy grew up.

Kerascoët have worked on numerous bandes dessinées as well as the animated television series Petit vampire and in advertisement. Several of their comics have been published in English by NBM Publishing, to critical acclaim. They were nominated for an Eisner Award for their comic Beautiful Darkness, and for the Ignatz Award for Outstanding Graphic Novel for Beauty.

== Works ==
- Anita O'Day, Editions Nocturne, 2001
- Donjon Crépuscule, written by Lewis Trondheim and Joann Sfar, Delcourt:
  - Volume 104 : Le Dojo du Lagon, 2005
  - Volume 105 : Les Nouveaux Centurions, 2005
- Miss Pas Touche (Miss Don't Touch Me), written by Hubert, Dargaud:
  - Volume 1 : La Vierge du bordel, 2006
  - Volume 2 : Du sang sur les mains, 2007
  - Volume 3 : Le prince charmant, 2008
  - Volume 4 : Jusqu'à ce que la mort nous sépare, 2009.
- Jolies Ténèbres (Beautiful Darkness), written by Marie Pommepuy and Fabien Vehlmann, Dupuis, 2009
- Cœur de glace, written by Marie Pommepuy, art by Patrick Pion, Dargaud, 2011
- Beauté (Beauty), written by Hubert, Dupuis:
  - Volume 1 : Désirs exaucés, 2011
  - Volume 2 : La reine indécise, 2012
  - Volume 3 : Simples mortels, 2013
- Voyage en Satanie, T.1 (Satania), written by Fabien Vehlmann, Dargaud, 2011.
- Les Tchouks, written by Benjamin Richard, Rue de Sèvres, 2014–
  - Volume 1 : On a fait une cabane, 2014
  - Volume 2 : On a vu la mer !, 2014
  - Volume 3 : On an Attaque un Chateau, 2015
- Malala's Magic Pencil written by Malala Yousafzai, 2019
- The Bug Girl, written by Sophia Spencer with Margaret McNamara, Schwartz & Wade Books, 2020
- De cape et de mots, written by Flore Vesco, Dargaud, 2022.
