= Doing Time (2002 film) =

- DVD cover
- Directed by: Yōichi Sai
- Written by: Wu Sin Chong; Yoshihiro Nakamura; Yōichi Sai
- Produced by: Nozomu Enoki
- Starring: Tsutomu Yamazaki; Teruyuki Kagawa; Tomorowo Taguchi; Yutaka Matsushige; Toshifumi Muramatsu
- Cinematography: Takeshi Hamada
- Edited by: Isao Kawase
- Music by: Tsugihiko Sasaki
- Production companies: Eisei Gekijo; Be-Wild
- Release date: May 14, 2002 (Japan)
- Running time: 93 minutes
- Country: Japan
- Language: Japanese

Doing Time (Japanese: 刑務所の中, Hepburn: Keimusho no Naka) is a 2002 Japanese film directed by Korean-Japanese film director Yōichi Sai. Based on Kazuichi Hanawa's manga of the same name, it follows the day-to-day routine of a middle-aged inmate at a low security Japanese prison.

The film uses a series of short vignettes to portray, often with understated humour, different aspects of prison life, especially the unvarying daily routines, the highly detailed rules, and the petty obsessions and minor pleasures that occupy the inmates' thoughts and conversations.

The film is based on the manga of the same name, which relates the author's experiences during a three-year prison sentence.

== Plot ==
Hanawa is a middle aged gun enthusiast, but is jailed for three years for possession of illegal firearms. He is placed in a low security prison in Hokkaidō.

He shares a cell with four other inmates, and adjusts to the strict rules which dictate prisoners' movements in minute detail. At first he is amused by the importance that his cellmates attach to normally trivial matters, but over the course of the film he too comes to find them a way of passing the time and relieving boredom.

After a minor transgression of the rules, he is placed in solitary confinement, where he finds contentment in his solitude and his repetitive job of assembling paper medicine bags.

== Reception ==
In 2026, Paper Chained gave the film four out of five stars, praising Tsutomu Yamazaki performance as Hanawa and saying the film "captures the themes of Hanawa's original manga narrative beautifully".
