= Malala's Magic Pencil =

Book by Malala Yousafzai

- Front cover
- Author: Malala Yousafzai
- Illustrator: Kerascoët (internal illustrations) Sarah J. Coleman (title lettering and illustration)
- Language: English
- Genre: Picture book, autobiography
- Publisher: Little, Brown and Company
- Publication date: 17 October 2017
- Media type: Print
- Pages: 48
- ISBN: 9780316319577
- OCLC: 966631718

Malala's Magic Pencil is a 2017 picture book authored by Malala Yousafzai and illustrated by Kerascoët. The book was published by Little, Brown and Company in the U.S., and Puffin Books in the U.K., with Farrin Jacobs as editor. It shows Yousafzai growing up in Swat, Pakistan, and wishing for a magic pencil to solve her problems; she learns that she is able to make change, such as advancing rights to female education, without one. The book has received very positive reviews, praising both Yousafzai's writing and Kerascoët's illustrations. The book appears on several lists of best children's books of 2017.

== Background ==
Malala Yousafzai is a Pakistani female education activist. Born in Swat Valley in Pakistan on 12 July 1997, she was raised by parents Ziauddin Yousafzai and Tor Pekai Yousafzai alongside two younger brothers Khushal and Atal. At age 11, Malala Yousafzai began writing an anonymous blog for BBC Urdu, detailing her life in Pakistan under the growing influence of the Taliban. Following the blog, she was the subject of a New York Times documentary Class Dismissed, and spoke out for female education in local media. Yousafzai was revealed as the author of the blog in December 2009, and as her public profile rose, she began to receive death threats. On 9 October 2012, a member of the Taliban shot Yousafzai as she was taking a bus from school to her home. She was first sent to a hospital in Peshawar, and later to one in Birmingham. She continued to rise to fame and speak out for the rights of girls; at age 17, she became the youngest Nobel Prize laureate by winning the 2014 Nobel Peace Prize.

In 2013, Yousafzai co-wrote her memoir I Am Malala with Christina Lamb, which was on The New York Times bestseller list for two weeks; in 2014, a youth edition of the book was published. Yousafzai decided to write a picture book as "many young children are interested in my story" and she wanted them to "see that even one person's actions can create change"; In October 2016, it was reported that Yousafzai was writing a picture book to be released in autumn 2017. Malala's Magic Pencil was inspired by Shaka Laka Boom Boom, an Indian television series about a young boy who owns a magic pencil. In an interview, Yousafzai says that writing the book was an "intense" process, involving a lot of work looking up dates and fact checking. Yousafzai also had to assist in "choosing the artists, figuring out how to express everything in pictures, and deciding if the art felt accurate—down to the cracks in the wall of our home."

Malala's Magic Pencil was published on 17 October 2017 by Little, Brown and Company in the U.S., and Puffin Books in the U.K. French illustrators Marie Pommepuy and Sébastien Cosset, known together as Kerascoët, provided the artwork for the book, and Farrin Jacobs served as editor. The front cover, other than Kerascoët's illustration of Yousafzai as a child, was designed by Sarah J. Coleman, also known as Inkymole.

== Synopsis ==
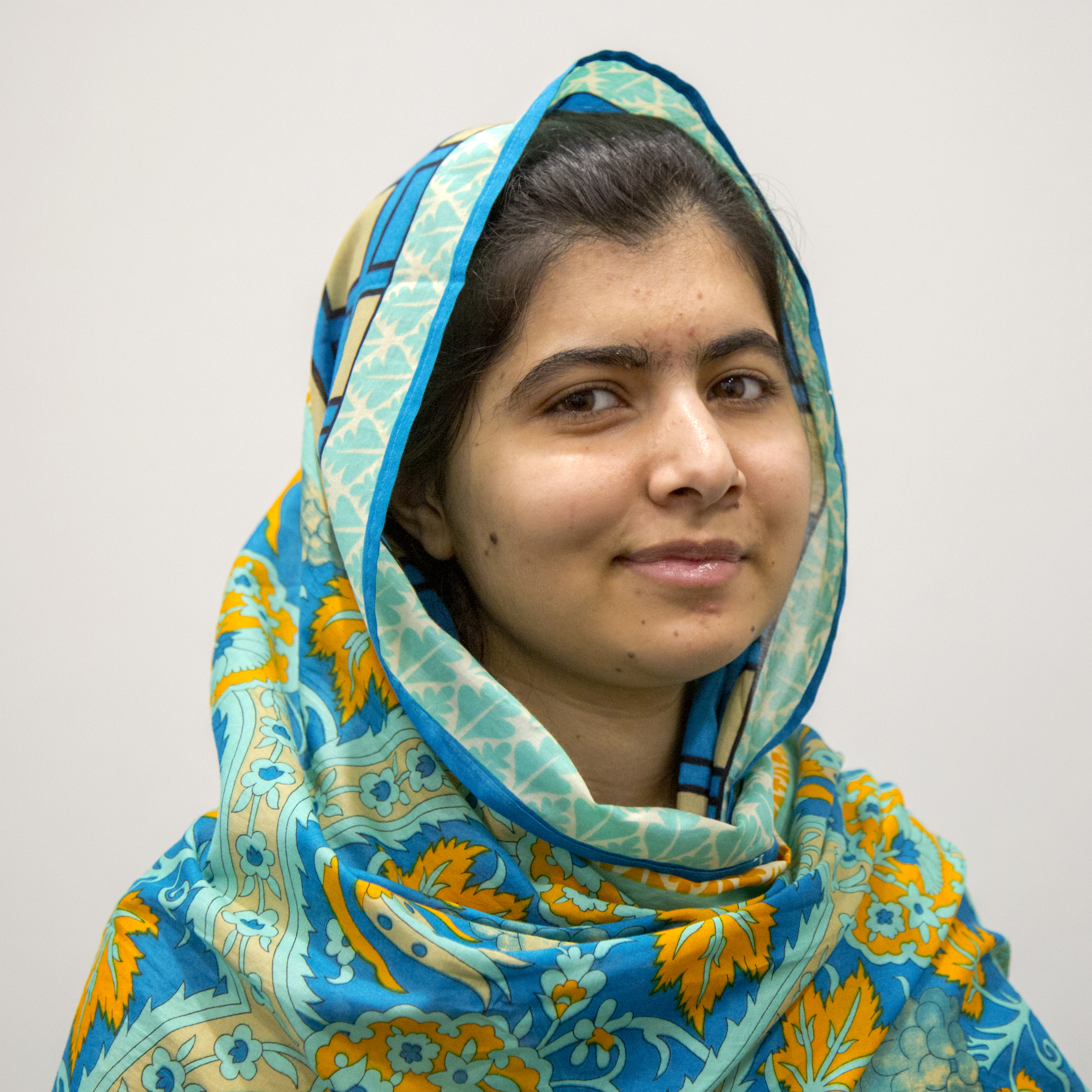
Malala Yousafzai in 2015

The book is written in the first person from the perspective of Malala Yousafzai, and documents her as a child, with a desire for a magic pencil to solve issues in her life; images depict her childhood home in Swat Valley. Using a simple vocabulary, it features watercolour illustrations, overlaid on which are "gold embellishments" and "bronze foiled swirls". The book is aimed at readers between ages 4 and 8. (Note: Most sources list age ranges between 4 and 8: The Bookseller report that the book is recommended for ages 4 to 7.; Chicago Tribune recommends the book for ages 4 to 8.; The Washington Post recommends the book for ages 5 to 8.; However, The News & Observer categorise it as for ages 8+.)

The book begins with the line "Do you believe in magic?" Yousafzai tells the reader about a television show about a boy with a magic pencil. Yousafzai says that if she had one, she would use her magic pencil for minor things such as to "stop time" in order to get more sleep or to create a football for her brothers. As she grows older, Yousafzai begins to wish that she had a magic pencil for more serious issues, such as to bring about peace. Though she never gets a magic pencil, she learns that she can change the world without one; by writing speeches about the injustice of girls being deprived of education, she can make a difference. Alluding to her shooting by the Taliban, the text "My voice became so powerful that the dangerous men tried to silence me. They failed." appears on a completely black page.

== Reception ==
By March 2018, The Bookseller reported that the book had over 5000 paperback sales in the U.K.

Malala's Magic Pencil was nominated for the 2018 Little Rebels Children's Book Award, judged by the Alliance of Radical Booksellers.

Rebecca Gurney of The Daily Californian gives the book a grade of 4.5 out of 5, calling it a "beautiful account of a terrifying but inspiring tale" and commenting "Though the story begins with fantasy, it ends starkly grounded in reality." Gurney praises the fact that the book's characters wear burqas, hijabs and salwar kameezes. In a review for The Guardian, Imogen Carter describes the book as "enchanting", opining that it "strikes just the right balance" between "heavy-handed" and "heartfelt", and is a "welcome addition to the frustratingly small range of children's books that feature BAME central characters".

Minh Le of Huffington Post chooses Malala's Magic Pencil as the best biographical picture book of 2017, commenting that "with Kerascoet's shimmering artwork bringing the illustrations to life, Malala continues to be an inspiration." Julia Lipscombe, writing for CBC.ca, lists the book as #1 on a list of "great kids' books" with protagonists of colour. Susie Wilde lists it as one of the best 2017 children's books, with the review, "her journey from dreams to reality has powerful imagery children will relate to". Karen MacPherson of Washington Post includes the book in an article "These books can help build strong girls — and boys — for today's world". MacPherson summarises that "Malala brings her story of courage and hope to young readers in this engaging and beautifully illustrated picture book autobiography."

Guy Haydon of South China Morning Post lists the book in a 2017 article entitled, "The 12 best children's books to give this Christmas." Haydon praises Yousafzai's "confident prose" which "never ducks the seriousness of her life", along with the "beautiful images" of Kerascoët; Haydon says that the two "combine to tell an enchanting and inspiring story." Chicago Tribune features the book in the 2017 article "10 kid's books for the holidays", reviewing that "dreamy watercolors with realistic detail and a cartoon sweetness enhance Malala's clear and dramatic retelling of her fight for girls' education in Pakistan" and calling it a "remarkable story." On Mic, Tirhakah Love includes Malala's Magic Pencil as the book on his weekly "The Hype List" for 16 October 2017. Love reviews the book as "a poignant children's book that offers a lovingly conjured reminder: Hope is its own kind of magic." and writes of Yousafzai that "nuanced telling of her childhood fantasies further cements her as one of her generation's most thoughtful, forward-looking leaders." Love calls the book "a statement about the power to reimagine and rebuild a crumbling world."
