= Doing Time (manga) =

Japanese manga series

- English edition cover

刑務所の中
- Genre: Essay manga
- Manga
- Written by: Kazuichi Hanawa
- Magazine: AX
- Original run: 1998 – 2000
- Volumes: 1

Doing Time (刑務所の中, Keimusho no Naka; Inside the Prison) is a Japanese manga written and illustrated by Kazuichi Hanawa. It was serialised in AX from 1998 until 2000, and was translated into English and published as a single book by Fanfare/Ponent Mon in 2004. In 2002, the manga was adapted into a film of the same name, directed by Yoichi Sai.

== Background and production ==
Hanawa, a manga writer and illustrator, was sentenced to three years in prison in December 1994 for possessing replica firearms and antique weapons, despite a national letter-writing campaign supporting leniency in his sentencing. While in custody, as a way to "keep his sanity", he meticulously recorded the rules and regulations that governed life in prison. After his release, he sent a postcard to Noriko Tetsuka, who had just founded AX, lamenting the financial difficulties which he had heard that the magazine was facing. Tetsuka responded, offering him the opportunity to create something for AX, to which he agreed immediately. Hanawa said that all he could think about was his time in prison, and began serialising prison stories based on true events for the magazine. AX was in a perilous financial position when the serial for Doing Time was finished, but Tetsuka credits the success of the book version of the manga with saving the magazine. Hanawa drew his illustrations for the book entirely from memory, as he was not permitted to draw in custody.

== Content ==
Hanawa is in jail waiting to be transferred to a larger prison, wondering how his cell accumulates so much dust, and imagining himself turning into a pig in prison with nothing to do but eat. After he transfers to a larger prison, he shares a cell with four other people, and works in the prison's factory carving wooden tissue boxes. "Recreated with a meticulousness rarely found in" comics, the manga includes floor plans, clothing options, the prison's daily schedules and a heavy and detailed focus on the food served in prison.

== Reception and awards ==
Doing Time received positive reviews. Andrew Arnold from Time praised its originality, memorable characters, and its illustrations which varied "from sharp realism to dramatic expressionism". Arnold commented that rather than being "a self-righteous polemic about injustice or the cruelty of incarceration, [it] instead seems to delight in recounting the details of life behind bars." Paul Gravett praised the "meticulous" description of prison life, describing the manga as "part autobiography, part art therapy, its creepy fascination lies in wondering how anyone could survive these dehumanising experiences and whether you could too." Writing in the book Manga Design, Masanao Amano praised the manga's realism, commenting that the lack of political message combined with its documentary-style content strongly engaged readers. In the International Journal of Law in Context, Carol Lawson cited it as an example of a "particularly poignant prison memoir", that was nostalgic "despite the militaristic atmosphere and the extraordinary control exercised" in Japanese prisons.

Doing Time was nominated for the 2001 Tezuka Osamu Cultural Prize, and had received the most votes in the first round of voting, when Hanawa declined the award, saying "I'm proud of myself as a minor manga artist, so I don't think I'm qualified for any kind of prize ... I'm not influenced by Osamu Tezuka". It was also nominated for the 2006 Angoulême International Comics Festival Prize for Scenario.

== See also ==
- Penal system of Japan
