= Kazuichi Hanawa =

Japanese manga artist

Kazuichi Hanawa (花輪和一, Hanawa Kazuichi; born April 17, 1947) is a Japanese manga artist.

== Life ==
Hanawa was born in Yorii, Saitama Prefecture. Since 1970 he worked as an illustrator. After reading the works of Yoshiharu Tsuge, he decided to switch to comic books. Hanawa's first work as a cartoonist was in 1971 with the short story "Kan no Mushi" (かんのむし) about a boy whose mother sends him to a sadistic acupuncturist, in the alternative manga magazine Garo where he mainly worked in his career to follow. From 1992 to 1994 he drew the manga series Tensui (天水) for Monthly Afternoon magazine, which achieved a much higher circulation than Garo and similar underground publications. Through his work for Monthly Afternoon and other mainstream magazines such as Manga Action and Super Action, he became known to a wider audience. Since 1998, Hanawa has been working for AX, the successor of Garo. In the 90s and 2000s he also published short stories in horror magazines aimed at a girls and young women like Suspense & Horror and Horror M, it was in the latter of the two where he serialized Fujōbutsu Reidōjo and its sequel.

In December 1994, he was arrested for illegally possessing modified model weapons and sentenced to three years in prison. Afterwards, he worked on the manga Doing Time, recalling his detention, for which he was nominated for the 2001 Osamu Tezuka Cultural Prize and the 2006 Angoulême International Comics Festival Prize for Scenario. This autobiographical work became a bestseller and received a film adaptation in 2002 under the direction of Yoichi Sai. Masanao Amano describes how the "outstanding realism" of the work is almost overwhelming to the reader: "Due to the documentary-like style without any sense of desire and political message [the reader] is completely sucked into the work."

His 2014 horror short story collection Juso ("Curse") was a Jury selected work at the 2015 Japan Media Arts Festival.

== Style and themes ==
Hanawa is sometimes considered the successor to Yoshiharu Tsuge. At the beginning of his career, he dedicated himself to the ero-guro style and created erotic-grotesque works like Red Night, about a samurai who rejects his thoughts of revenge and is driven to suicide by his wife, and Niku Yashiki (肉屋敷). Many of these works were parodies of militarism and the traditional values of Japanese culture. From the beginning of the 1980s, his manga were spiritually influenced by Buddhism and were located mainly in the Japan of the Edo and the Meiji periods and in a futuristic setting. The faces of his characters are reminiscent of Ukiyo-e; his drawings are detailed and dark.

== Legacy ==
Manga artist Gengoroh Tagame cites Hanawa's depictions of extreme violence as an influence for his work.

His work has been translated into English, Spanish, Portuguese, French and Italian.

== Selected works ==
- Kan no Mushi (かんのむし) (one-shot in Garo, 1971)
- Red Night (赤ヒ夜, Akai Yoru) (1984, published in English by Breakdown Press)
- Gōho Dōji (護法童子) (1984–1986)
- Otogizōshi (御伽草子) (1991)
- Tensui (天水) (serialized in Monthly Afternoon, 1992–1994)
- Doing Time (刑務所の中, Keimusho no Naka) (serialized in AX, 1998–2000)
- Nippon Mukashibanashi (ニッポン昔話) (2000)
- Fujōbutsu Rei Dōjo (不成仏霊童女) (serialized in Horror M, 2000–2007)
- Keimusho no Mae (刑務所の前) (2002–2007)
- Juso (呪詛) (2014)
