= La Queue du Marsupilami =

Comic album related to adventures

Marsupilami #1 La Queue du Marsupilami
- Cover of the Belgian edition
- Date: 1987
- Series: Marsupilami
- Publisher: Marsu Productions

Creative team
- Writers: Greg
- Artists: Franquin; Batem; Vittorio Leonardo (colors)
- Colorists: Vittorio Leonardo

Original publication
- Date of publication: 1987
- Language: French

Chronology
- Followed by: Le Bébé du bout du monde, 1988

La queue du Marsupilami, written by Greg and drawn by Franquin and his collaborator Batem, is a comic album relating the adventures of the fictional character Marsupilami. This album is the number 1 in the series of Marsupilami albums, published by Marsu Productions.

== History ==
With the album La queue du Marsupilami, a new series is launched by Franquin entirely dedicated to the adventures of Marsupilami, who only appeared as a secondary character in the Spirou and Fantasio comics series. This album sold more than 600.000 copies. From 1987, one album was published each year. This first album was reedited three times, in 1991, 1997 and 2007. The creation of this new series was also forced by legal reasons: when Franquin left the publishing company Dupuis to start on his own Marsu Productions, he brought his own creations Marsupilami and Gaston Lagaffe along with him, but had to leave the older characters Spirou and Fantasio at Dupuis. Thus, the characters could no longer have common adventures. .

== Story ==
In the Palombia jungle, Bring M. Backalive, a hunter who seeks personal glory, searches for a marsupilami, an animal that nobody had never captured. The hunter's attempts are occasions for some gags. The tone is largely humoristic and the hunter rather a comic character than a dangerous man. The story is also an opportunity to discover the way of life and the several abilities of the marsupilamis including the ejector paws and elongating tails.
