= Fabien Vehlmann =

French comics writer

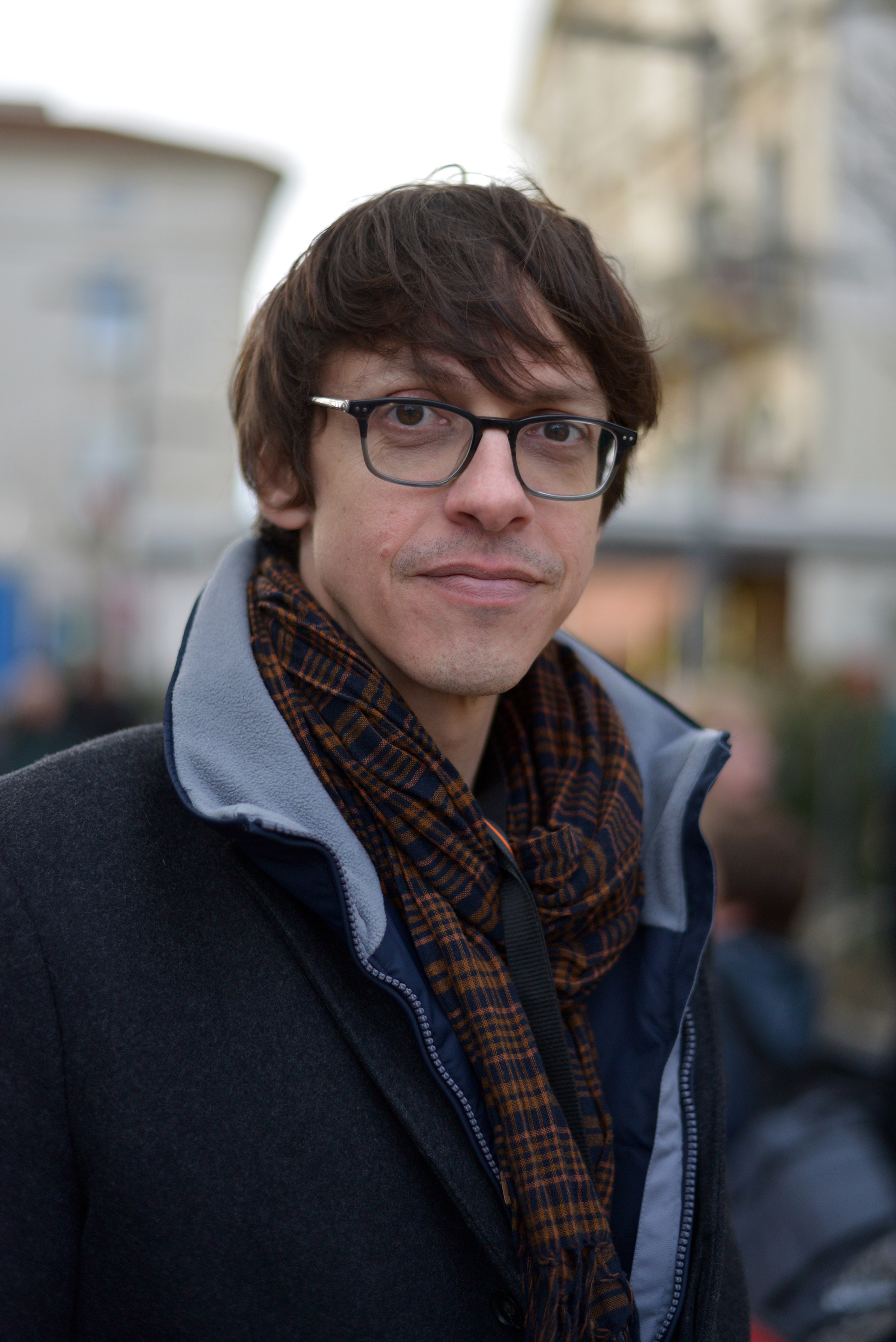
- Fabien Vehlmann (2015)
- Born: January 30, 1972 (age 54) Mont-de-Marsan
- Area: Writer
- Notable works: Green Manor, Seuls, Spirou et Fantasio

Fabien Vehlmann (born 30 January 1972) is a French comics writer best known for Green Manor and Seuls. Yvan Delporte called him "the René Goscinny of the third millennium".

== Biography ==
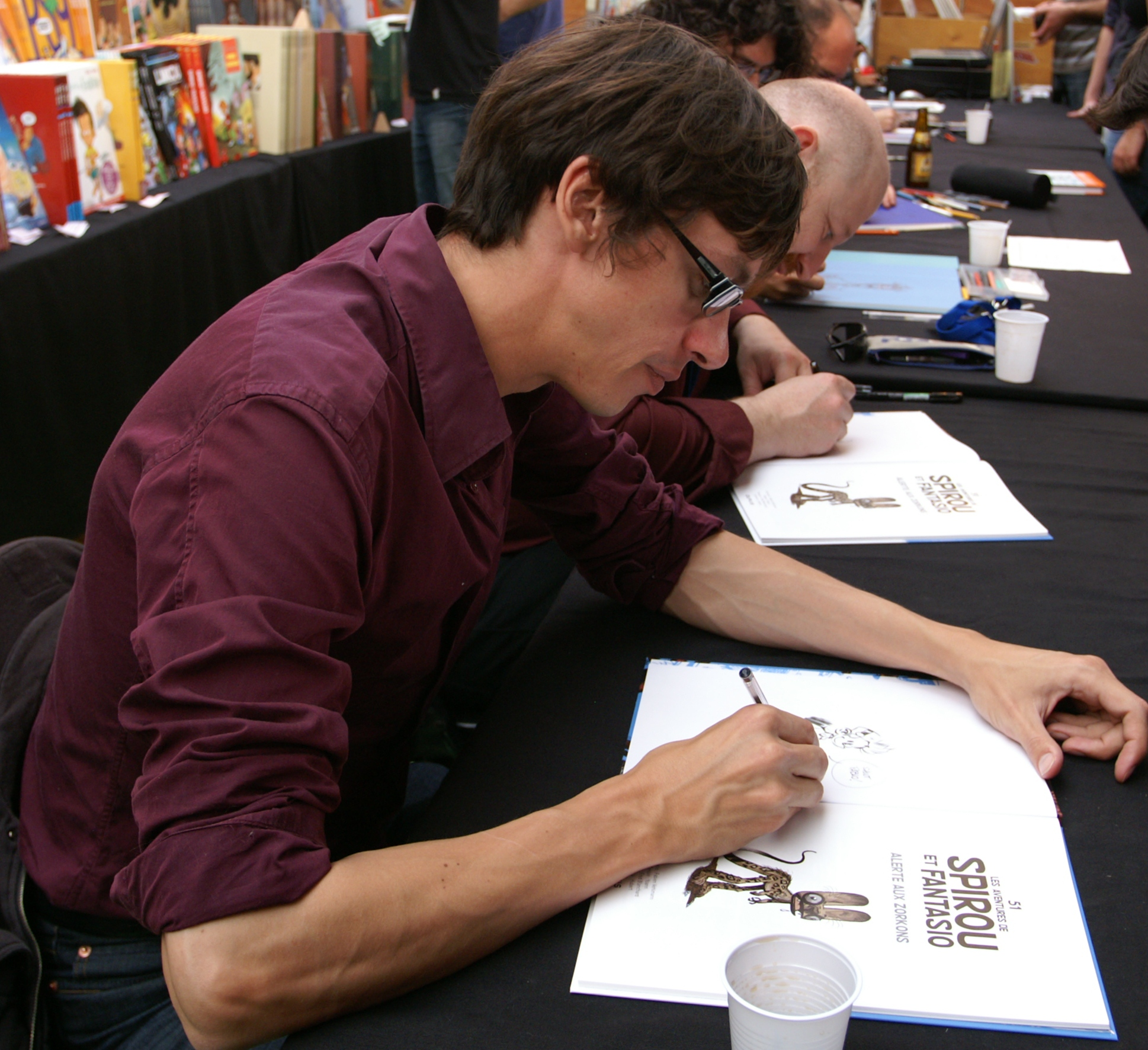
Fabien Vehlmann, Quai des Bulles, Saint-Malo, 2010

Fabien Vehlmann, born in 1972 in Mont-de-Marsan, grew up in the Landes and the Savoie. He studied in Nantes. He started writing comics in 1996, but only got to work for Spirou magazine the next year, where he provided very short stories for the weekly summary of the magazine. Soon, some stories of a few pages followed, with artwork by a number of different artists, including Eric Maltaite and René Follet. His first recurring series was Green Manor with Denis Bodart. With Bruno Gazzotti he created Seuls.

In January 2009, it was announced in Spirou magazine #3694 that Jean-David Morvan and José-Luis Munuera would be succeeded as the creative team behind the series Spirou et Fantasio by Yoann and Vehlmann, who had together created the first volume of Une aventure de Spirou et Fantasio par.... Their first album in the regular series is announced for October 2009. In his creative process, Vehlmann is known for a collaborative approach, giving significant creative freedom to his illustrators and adapting the narrative pacing to match their visual style. This methodology was highly prominent in his work on Seuls with Bruno Gazzotti. While initially perceived as a standard children's adventure, Vehlmann intentionally steered the series into a dark, psychological thriller that tackles complex themes such as death, isolation, and moral relativism, challenging traditional boundaries of youth literature.

== Bibliography ==
Series	Years	Volumes	Artist	Editor
Green Manor	2001–2005	3	Denis Bodart	Dupuis (English publisher: Cinebook Ltd)
Des lendemains sans nuage	2001	1	Bruno Gazzotti and Ralph Meyer	Le Lombard
Samedi et Dimanche	2001 -	4	Gwen	Dargaud
Le Marquis d'Anaon	2002 -	5	Matthieu Bonhomme	Dargaud
La nuit de l'Inca	2003–2004	2	Frantz Duchazeau	Dargaud
Ian	2003 -	4	Ralph Meyer	Dargaud
Wondertown	2005 -	2	Benoît Feroumont	Dupuis
Les cinq conteurs de Bagdad	2006	1	Frantz Duchazeau	Dargaud
Seuls	2006–present	14	Bruno Gazzotti	Dupuis
Une Aventure de... Spirou et Fantasio	2006	1	Yoann	Dupuis
Sept psychopathes	2007	1	Sean Phillips	Delcourt
Dieu qui pue, dieu qui pête	2008	1	Frantz Duchazeau	Milan
Jolies Ténèbres (Beautiful Darkness)	2009	1	Kerascoët	Drawn and Quarterly
Spirou et Fantasio	2010-2021	5	Yoann	Dupuis
L'Île aux cent mille Morts	2011	1	Jason	Glénat
La Cuisine des Ogres	2024	1	Jean-Batiste Andreae	Rue De Sèvres

== Awards ==
- 2002: Iris award at the Prix Saint-Michel for Le Marquis d'Anaon
- 2002: nominated for the Angoulême International Comics Festival Award for Best Scenario for Green Manor
- 2002: nominated for the Angoulême International Comics Festival Award for First Comic Book for Samedi et Dimanche
- 2005: nominated for the Angoulême International Comics Festival Award for Best Scenario for Le Marquis d'Anaon
- 2006: nominated for Best comic (French language) at the Prix Saint-Michel for Seuls
- 2007: Prix des libraires BD, awarded by Canal BD, for Les cinq conteurs de Bagdad
- 2008: nominated for Best Youth Comic at the Prix Saint-Michel for Seuls 3
