= Yoann =

French comics artist

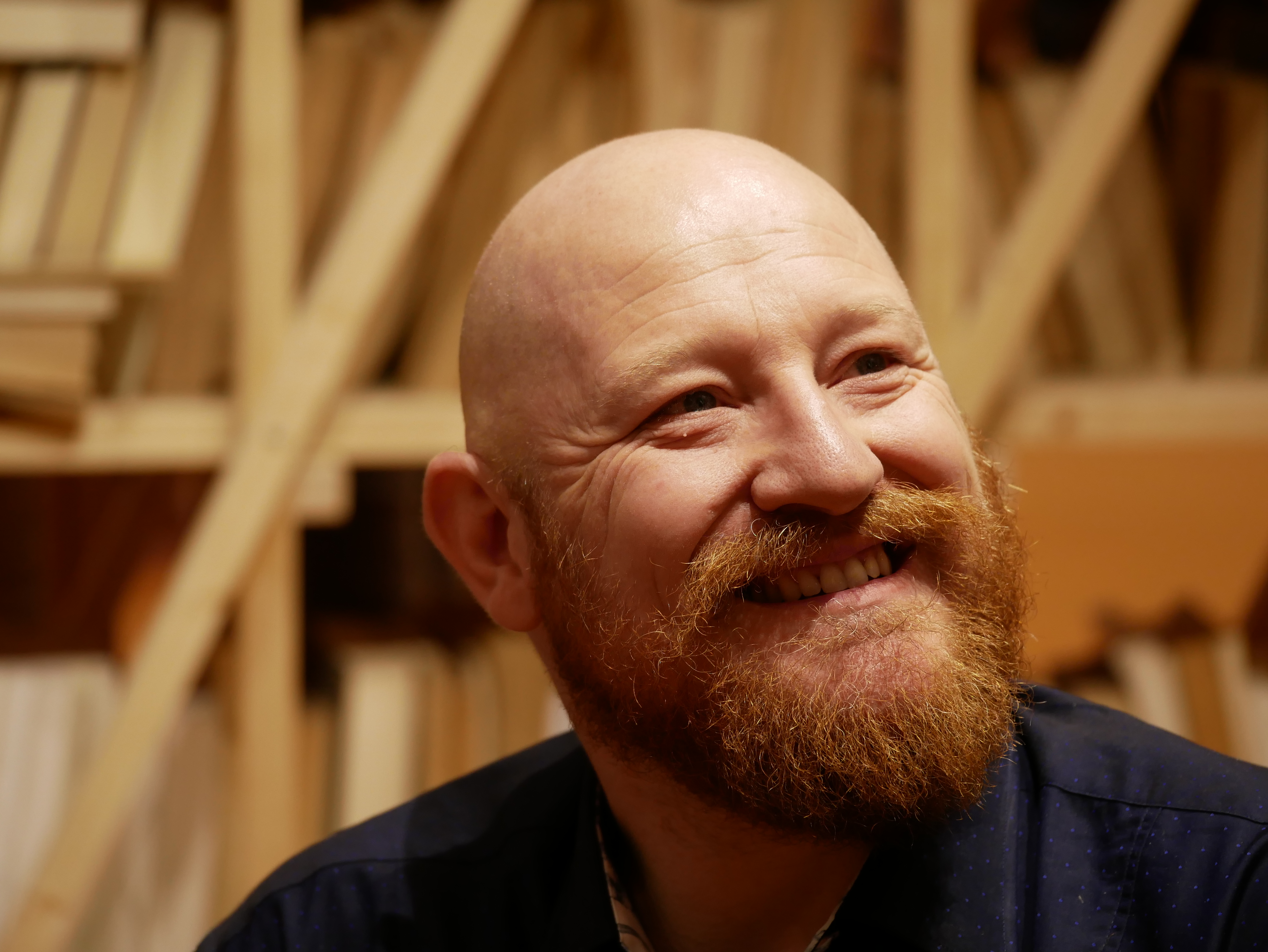
- Yoann Chivard (2017)
- Born: Yoann Chivard; 8 October 1971; Alençon
- Education: École supérieure d'art et de design TALM-Angers
- Occupation: comics artist

Yoann Chivard (born 8 October 1971 in Alençon, Orne), better known under the artist name Yoann is a French comics artist.

In January 2009, it was announced that Yoann and the comics writer Fabien Vehlmann would take over the responsibility for the Spirou et Fantasio comic strip. It had by then for a while been clear that Dupuis had plans to replace Morvan and Munuera, the duo that had then for some years had the main responsibility for Spirou et Fantasio. Yoann and Vehlmann had by then already created the first volume of Une aventure de Spirou et Fantasio par.... Their first album in the regular series is announced for October 2009.
