= Angoulême International Comics Festival Prix Jeunesse 9–12 ans =

The Prix Jeunesse 9–12 ans is awarded to comics authors at the Angoulême International Comics Festival. It rewards the best album for a 9 to 12 years old targeted public. The award started in 1981 as the "Alfred enfant", without the distinction in age groups. In 1984, the named changed for one year to "Alfred du meilleur album enfant". From 1987, distinction is made between the age categories. This award is then called "Alfred moins de 12 ans". In 1988, the name changes to "Alfred du meilleur album jeunesse". In 1989, the name changes again to "Alph'art Jeunesse". Between 1991 and 1995, the distinction between the two categories disappears. In 1996, the name changes to "Alph'art Jeunesse 9–12 ans".

== Award winners ==
the winner of the award for that year is listed first and the nominees are listed below.

=== 1980s ===
- 1981: Boule et Bill: Bill est maboul by Roba, Dupuis
- 1982: Yakari: Le secret de Petit Tonnerre by Derib (artist) and Job (author), Casterman
- 1983: L'étalon noir by Faure and Genin, Hachette
- 1984: The Smurfs: Les Schtroumpfs Olympiques by Peyo, Dupuis
- 1985: Trafic by Sternis and Cothias
- 1986: Papyrus: La métamorphose d'Imhotep by De Gieter, Dupuis
- 1987: Léonid Beaudragon: Le fantôme du Mandchou fou by Jean-Claude Forest and Savard, Bayard
- 1988: Cori le moussaillon: l'expédition maudite by Bob de Moor, Casterman
- 1989: Aquablue by Vatine and Cailleteau, Delcourt

=== 1990s ===
- 1990: Robin Dubois: Des oh et des bah! by Turk and De Groot, Le Lombard
- 1991: Billy the Cat: Dans la peau d'un chat by Stephane Colman (artist) and Stephen Desberg (author), Dupuis
- 1992: Le Petit Spirou by Tome and Janry, Dupuis
  - Special mention: Valérian and Laureline: Les habitants du ciel by Pierre Christin and Jean-Claude Mézières
- 1993: Prélude à l'apeupréhistoire by Widenlocher and Herlé, Dargaud
- 1994: Donito: Le grand secret by Conrad, Dupuis
- 1995: Mangecoeur: Dans le jeu des miroirs by Andreae and Gallie
- 1996: Titeuf: C'est pô juste! by Zep
- (1997: no award in this category)
- (1998: no award in this category)
- (1999: no award in this category)

=== 2000s ===
- 2000: Lanfeust de Troy part 7 by Christophe Arleston and Didier Tarquin, Soleil
  - Franky Snow: Slide à mort by Buche, Glénat
  - Merlin: Contre le Père Noël by Joann Sfar and José-Luis Munuera, Dargaud
  - Nathalie: Le nombril du monde by Sergio Salma, Casterman,
  - Soda: Dieu seul le sait by Bruno Gazzotti and Tome, Dupuis
- 2001: Les Profs: Interro surprise by Pica and Erroc, Bamboo
  - CRS = détresse:Coup, coup, c'est nous by Achdé (artist) and Raoul Cauvin (author), Dargaud
  - Gaspard de Besse by Béhem, Daric
  - Malika Secouss part 3 by Téhem, Glénat
  - Meurtre sous la manche part 1 by Sikorski (artist) and Denis Lapière (author), Dupuis
- 2002: Trolls de Troy: Les maléfices de la thaumaturge by Christophe Arleston and Jean-Louis Mourier, Soleil
  - Kid Paddle: Waterminator by Midam, Dupuis
  - Malika Secouss: Groove ton chemin by Téhem, Glénat
  - Wake (Sillage): Le signe des démons by Jean-David Morvan and Philippe Buchet, Delcourt
  - Tendre banlieue: Appél au calme by Tito, Casterman
- 2003: Zap collège part 1 by Téhem, Glénat
  - Les babyfoots part 1 by Pica and Bouchard
  - Franck Snow part 4 by Buche
  - Rob, Wed et Co part 3 by Janvier, Erroc and Jenfèvre
  - Titeuf part 9 by Zep
- 2004: Luuna: Le crépuscule du lynx by Crisse & Nicolas Kéramidas, Soleil
  - Bételgeuse: Les cavernes by Léo, Dargaud
  - L'Héritage d'Emilie: Maeve by Florence Magnin, Dargaud
  - Les profs: Chute des cours by Pica & Erroc, Bamboo
  - Wake (Sillage): Artifices by Jean-David Morvan & Philippe Buchet, Delcourt
- 2005: Lou!: Journal infime by Julien Neel, Glénat
  - Navis: Houyo by Philippe Buchet, José Luis Munuera and Jean-David Morvan, Delcourt
  - Les profs part 6 by Pica and Erroc, Bamboo
  - Le scorpion: Le démon du Vatican by Enrico Marini (artist) and Stephen Desberg (author), Dargaud
  - Tessa agent intergalactique: Sidéral killer by Mitric, Louis and Lamirand, Soleil
- 2006: Wake (Sillage): Nature humaine by Jean-David Morvan and Philippe Buchet, Delcourt
  - L'enfant de l'orage: La croisée des vents by Didier Poli and Manuel Bichebois, Les Humanoïdes Associés
  - Kid Paddle: Darc, j'adore! by Midam, Dupuis
  - Les naufragés d'Ythag: Terra Incognita by Adrien Floch and Christophe Arleston, Soleil
  - Navis: Girodouss by Philippe Buchet, José Luis Munuera and Jean-David Morvan, Delcourt

=== 2020s ===
- Les Vermeilles by Camille Jourdy (young readers) and Le Tigre des neiges, t. 4 by Akiko Higashimura (young adults)
