= HK (comic book) =

French comic book series

- Author(s): Kevin Hérault; Jean-David Morvan
- Illustrator: Kevin Hérault
- Launch date: June 1996
- End date: 2012
- Publisher: Glénat Éditions
- Genre: Science fiction
- Original language: French

HK is a French comic book series published since 1996 by Glénat, and created by Kevin Hérault and scriptwriter Jean-David Morvan.

The series features Karl Hollister, a young handicapped man living on Avalon, an exoplanet that humans colonized during a period of space conquest. The return of the Earth's armed forces to his planet has a major impact on his life. This is a science-fiction adventure comic focusing on the Initiatory journey of young HK.

From 1996 to 1998, three volumes were first published in manga format in the "Akira" collection. In 2001, Hérault continued the series on his own in traditional Franco-Belgian format in the "Grafica" collection. After publishing one volume of this second series, he set about remaking the first three "manga" volumes into six "franco-belge" format volumes. Health problems prevented the artist from completing this work, and the series has been on hold since 2012.

Praised for its credible universe and beautiful, dynamic drawings, the series draws its inspiration from Seinen manga as well as French culture. Despite the qualities noted by critics, the series struggles to find its audience.

== Universe ==
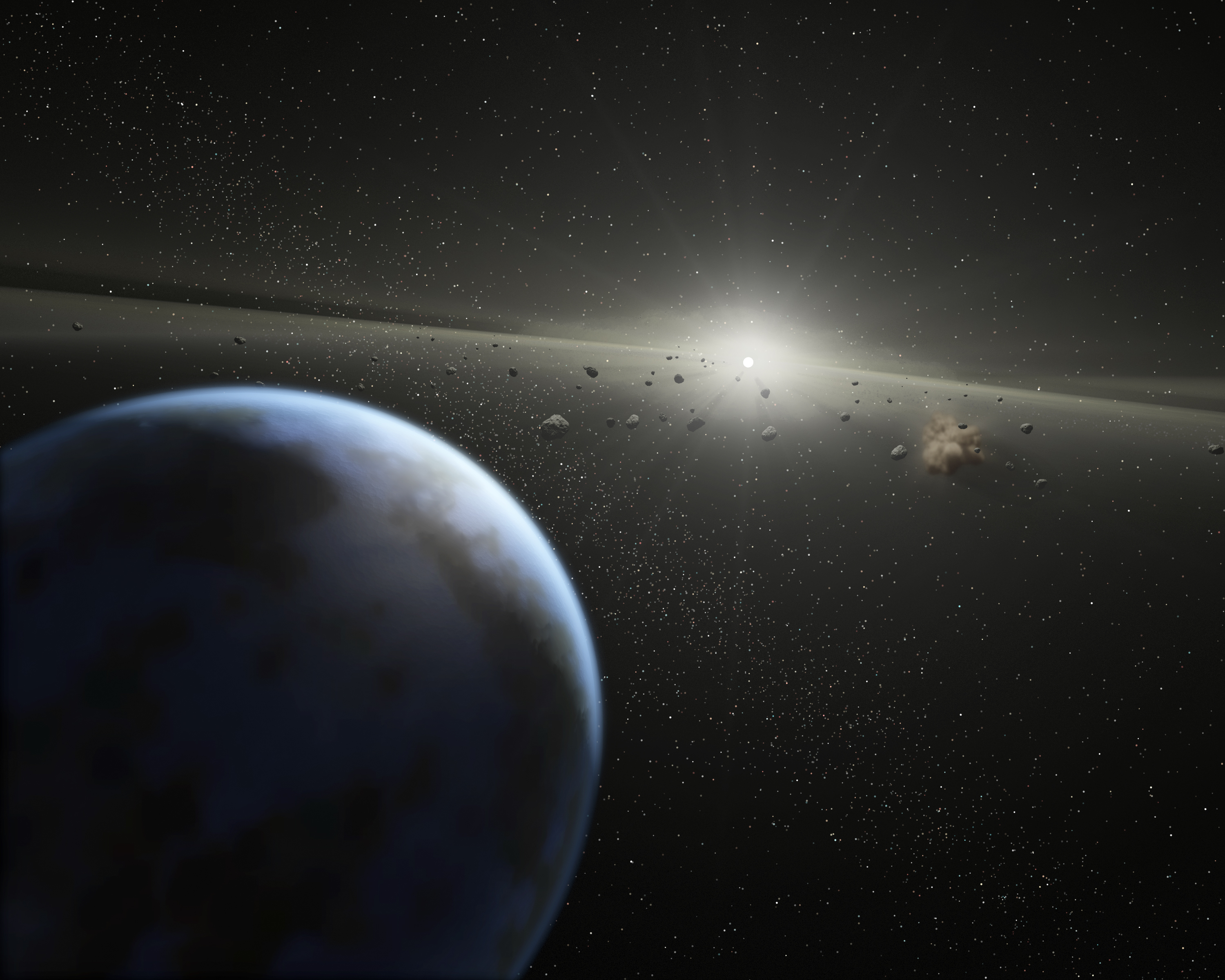
An artist's view of a planet from space.

=== Background ===
In the 35th century, the human species colonized space, narrowly escaping extinction on Earth. One thousand three hundred years after the departure of the first settlers, the Sphere (the name given to the space colonized by humans) extends to around thirty-seven parsecs of the Solar System. Human history has seen the birth of new states, new economies and new conflicts.

The Earth government, which has been in place for a century, is an organization whose functional structure spans all fields of the humanities (economics, industry, politics and the military) to act as a single entity: Axe. Some see Axe as a military-industrial megacorporation whose sole aim is to gain power and profits.

=== Synopsis ===
In February 3408, Axe regained control of the planets it had lost in the independence conflicts fifty years earlier. Avalon is one of these planets.

On the mining spaceport, the return of the Terran troops has not met with unanimous approval. The population is skeptical, unlike the authorities, who believe this new alliance will pull Avalon out of the economic slump into which it has fallen. Karl and his cousin Cedrick are two minor thieves from the docks. They try to continue their schemes despite the imposition of martial law. Lola Sterling, the daughter of the conciliator in charge of negotiating the terms of collaboration with Axe, is dismayed by the return of the Earthlings. With friends from high society, she decides to form a small group to resist Axe. More idealistic than true revolutionaries, the members of this group are quickly overwhelmed by the consequences of their actions. On one of their nocturnal missions, they meet Cedrick and Karl's gang. They forge an alliance that will lead to an explosive situation.

Flag of Axe

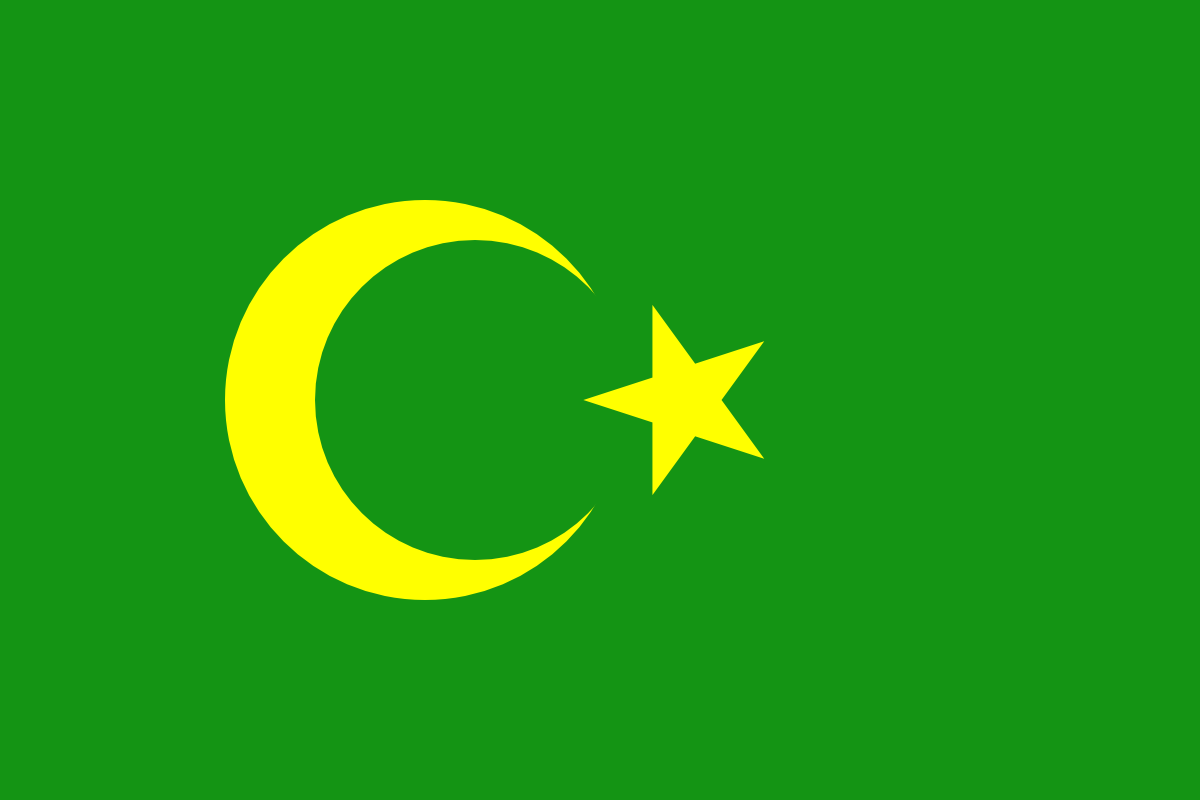
Flag of Avalon

=== Main characters ===
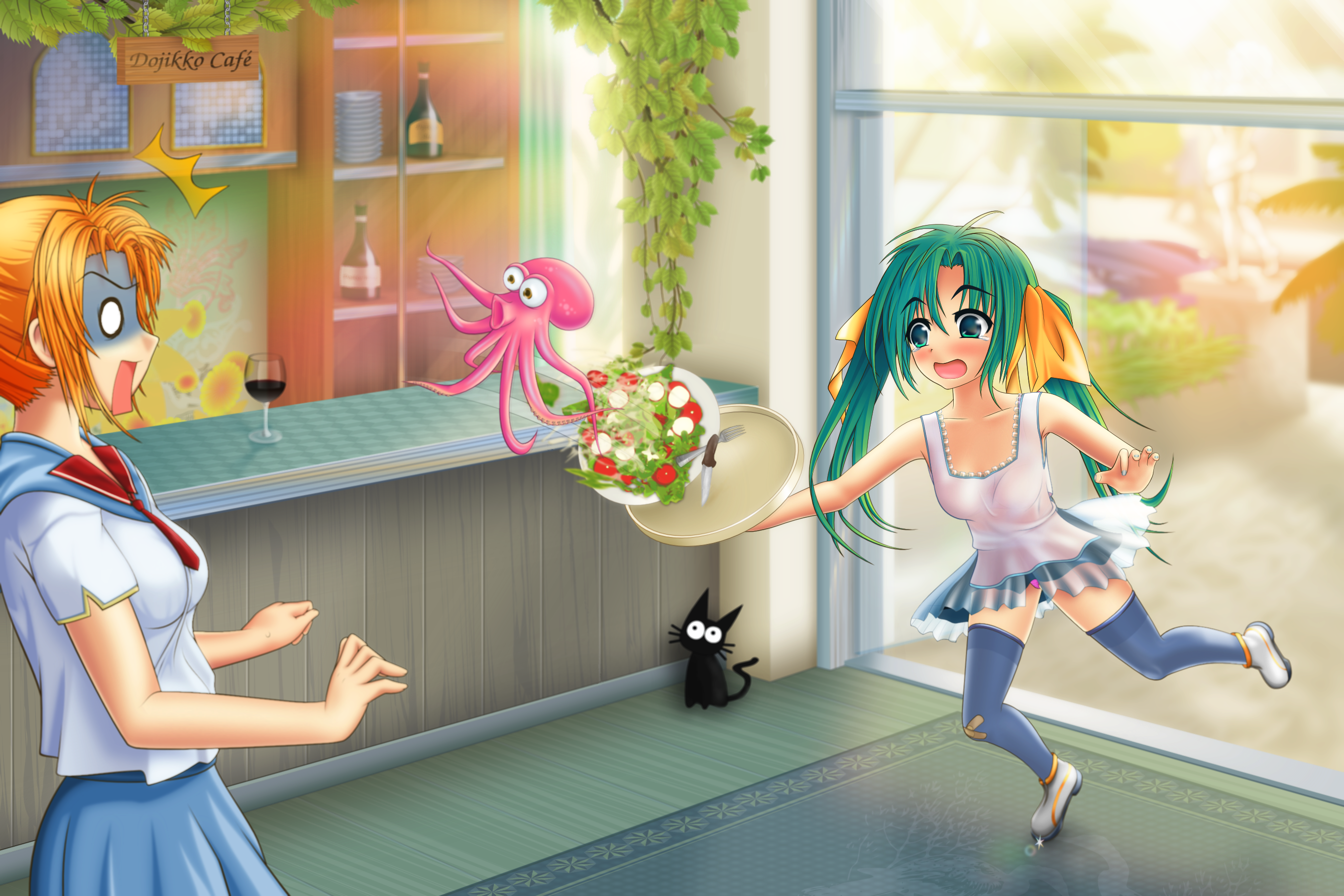
Like Karl, green-haired characters are common in manga.

- Karl Hollister (HK (Note: Karl Hollister's initials serve as the title of the series. He bears the same initials as series creator Kévin Hérault.)) is the story's main character. He is the second of three children. His older brother is Nathaniel, and his younger sister Candice. (Note: Panel number 046.I.II.) Along with his mother, brother and sister, Karl has green hair. Coming from a modest family, he had to start working at an early age. At the age of fifteen, he became an artificer in the large Caldera mine. Two years later, in 3406, an explosives accident left him with both legs amputated. (Note: Panel number 036.I.III.) Avalon's social security system paid for two prosthetic legs, but he was unable to find work again. Together with his cousin Cedrick, he set up a small gang of thieves in the docklands district. He goes out with a girl called Magalie. (Note: Panel number 008.I.II.) The name Hollister was inspired by a character in the novel The Forever War. This book is one of HK's main influences.
- Eulalie "Lola" Sterling is the daughter of the Avalonian conciliator Adémar Sterling. Surrounded by her father and his butler Ghislain, she is part of the privileged youth and has grown up far from the problems of the majority of Avalon's inhabitants. (Note: Panel number 002.I.III.) As a student, she hopes to obtain a doctorate in sociology.
- Cedrick Hollister is Karl's first cousin and best friend. He lives with his mother and little sister Emeline. Like his cousin, he worked in the mine from an early age. He resigns after the accident that cost both of his cousin's legs. (Note: Panel number 062.I.III.) He and his cousin set up a small, organized gang of thieves on the docks. Some of the members of this gang were childhood friends of the two cousins, such as Anton and Enya. (Note: Panel number 043.I.III.)

=== Supporting characters ===
- Adémar Sterling: leader of a student movement in the 3350s, he played an active role in the Avalon War of Independence. He then entered politics. (Note: Panels number 020.I.III. – 021.I.III.) After many years in politics, he was appointed Conciliator of Avalon.
- Anton: a childhood friend of Karl and Cedrick. With his girlfriend Enya, he is one of Cedrick's gang. (Note: Panel number 018.I.IV.) He eventually becomes his sworn enemy.
- Buuhalis: an Axe cyborg, whose brain and spinal cord are integrated into a mechanical cortex protected by a heavy technological envelope. (Note: Panel number 054.I.IV.) He is transferred by the Lieutenant to serve as Karl's partner in his battalion aboard the Balaena Nūn. (Note: Panel number 046.I.V.) He has a strong sense of humor. The character's name is derived from that of letterer L. Lois Buhalis, who officiated on the American adaptation of Masamune Shirow's manga Appleseed. Buuhalis is a double tribute to the character Briareos Hecatonchires from Appleseed and the Evas from the TV series Neon Genesis Evangelion.
- Emeline Hollister: Cedrick's little sister and Karl's cousin, she's young and innocent. She takes a negative view of the girls who hang around her cousin. (Note: Panel number 021.I.II.)
- Eucharistie Asumita: she is a cybernetic transplant surgeon and captain in Axe army. (Note: Panel number 019.I.IV.) The name Asumita was chosen by the authors for its Japanese sound, which contrasts with the Christian name Eucharistie, which in ancient Greek means Thanksgiving. She was inspired by the German model Chloe Vevrier. (Note: Panel number 071.I.IV.)
- L'intendante Chouraqui: a trainer aboard the starship Balaena Nūn. (Note: Panel number 029.I.V.) Her name is a tribute to French director Élie Chouraqui, whose film Qu'est-ce qui fait courir David? (What makes David run?) (1982) is beloved by Kevin Hérault.
- Chief Steward Gabrielle Rasczak: the trainer of Karl's battalion aboard the training ship Balaena Nūn. (Note: Panel number 024.I.V.) Her name is a tribute to Lieutenant Jean Rasczak, Johnny Rico's mentor in Starships Troopers (1959) and in its film adaptation Starship Troopers (1997).
- Ivar Miossec: (Note: Panel number 013.I.IV.) son of a minister and grandson of a deputy, (Note: Panel number 021.I.I.) he went to the Ecole des Beaux-Arts. (Note: Panel number 017.I.I.) He belongs to Lola's group of friends and they had a brief fling together. (Note: Panel number 038.I.I.) His name is a tribute to the French singer Christophe Miossec.
- The lieutenant: a mysterious Axe officer, he belongs to the Special Commandos. (Note: Panel number 002.I.II.) His mission is to recruit "prey" for training on board of one of Axe penitentiaries. (Note: Panel number 051.I.IV.)
- Mapi Pûun: this eight-year-old half-cat, half-human was created in a genetic laboratory. She underwent accelerated growth in a tank to obtain the appearance of a sixteen-year-old woman more quickly. She works as a nurse in the army stationed on the Massilia asteroid. (Note: Panel number 043.II.I.)
- Marshal Schnurrbart and Colonel Augenbraue: senior Axe officers, (Note: In German, Schnurrbart means “moustache” and Augenbraue means “eyebrows”.) they are the ambassadors sent by Axe to ratify the trade treaty with the planet Avalon.
- Ophélie Summer: a journalist at LCI, she tried to conduct investigative journalism but was soon confronted with Axe censorship. (Note: Panel number 008.I.IV.) Her name and appearance were inspired by the French singer Ophélie Winter.
- Reith Vance, Rico Heinlein, Hari Asimov, Chan Lehman and Mulligan Brunner: these are Karl's fellow students aboard the training ship Balaena Nūn. (Note: Panel number 006.I.V.) All these characters have names borrowed from heroes and authors of science fiction novels. Vance is a reference to Adam Reith, hero of Jack Vance's Planet of Adventure, Rico to Johnny Rico, hero of Robert A. Heinlein's Starship Troopers, Asimov to Hari Seldon, hero of Isaac Asimov's Fondation series, Lehman to Chan Coray, hero of Serge Lehman's F.A.U.S.T. novel trilogy and Brunner to Chad Mulligan, hero of John Brunner's Stand on Zanzibar.
- Hubert Saglier, Ernesto Barr and Cécile Tokarev: military personnel assigned with Karl to the Massilia space station. (Note: Panel number 023.II.I.)
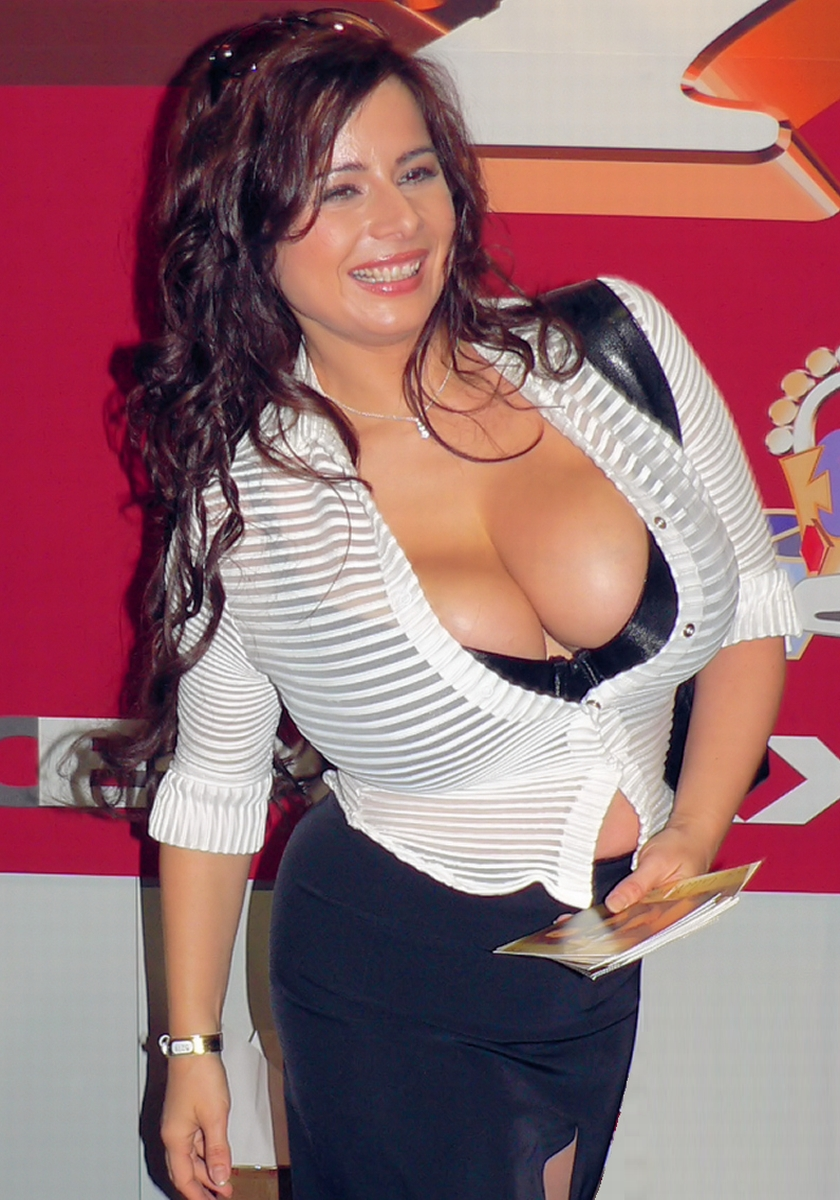
Chloe Vevrier is the visual model for the Eucharistie Asumita character.

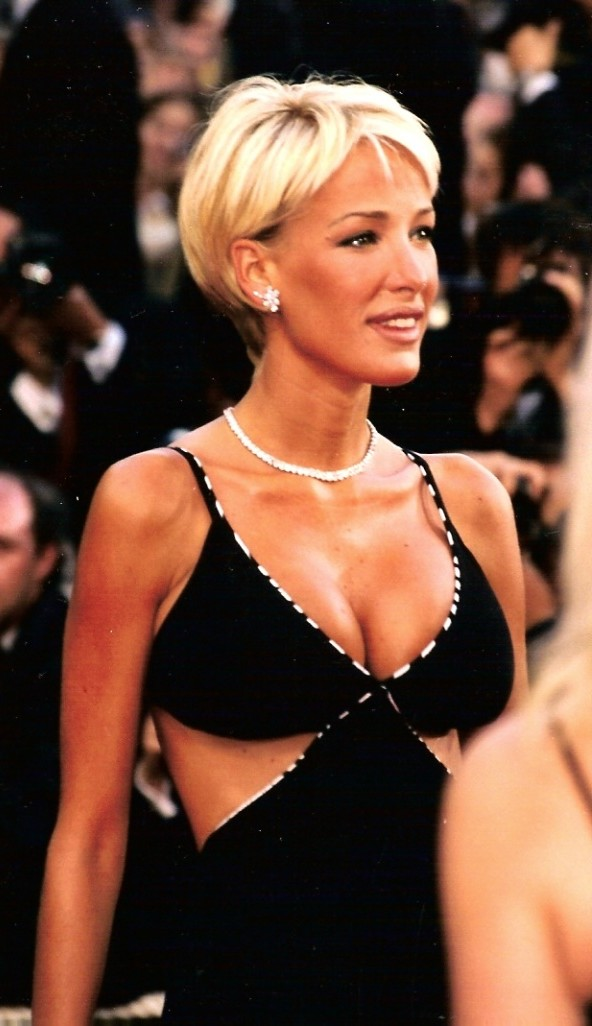
Ophélie Winter is the visual model for the Ophélie Summer character.

=== People ===
The series is essentially about two main groups:

==== Axe Earthlings ====
Axe is the organization that governs Earth and many other planets. Earthlings serve Axe. Life on Earth is opulent and well-regulated. (Note: Panel number 057.I.III.) Some fifty years after the Avalon independence conflict, the “Nine Generals” who run Axe are once again imposing their power on former colonies (like Avalon) in exchange for economic partnership. Through these treaties, Axe secures from the governments of these planets the enlistment of a maximum number of unemployed young people and delinquents in their army. The reason for this massive recruitment could be an upcoming war with an unknown power. (Note: Panels numbers 006.I.III. – 008.I.III.) Despite its supposed omnipotence, Axe is infiltrated by a fifth column consisting of separatists from various planets. (Note: Panel number 065.I.II.)

==== The Avalonians ====
In 3353, (Note: Panel number 037.I.IV.) the Avalonians gained autonomy after a war of independence. The final military action of this conflict was Axe's destruction of the lunar facilities, which caused thousands of deaths. The debris from Avalon's former moon formed a ring in geostationary orbit, with some fragments even crashing onto the planet. (Note: Panels numbers 011.I.II. and 051.I.III.) In the years that followed, the planet fell into an economic slump, generating a high rate of poverty. In 3408, the Avalon authorities agreed to negotiate an alliance treaty with Axe in the hope of revitalizing the planet's economy.

=== Starships ===
As in many science-fiction series, starships in HK are the only means of communication between different planets. In the series, Axe ships resemble marine animals:

- The Lafayette: It takes its shape from the dolphin (Tursiops truncatus) and its name from the French frigate La Fayette. It was offered by Axe to the Avalon government. (Note: Panel number 034.I.I.)
- The Balaena Nūn: It takes its shape from the whale shark (Rhincodon typus). This is the twenty-fifth vessel of this type, as Nun is the twenty-fifth letter of the Arabic alphabet. It was on this vessel that Karl began his apprenticeship. (Note: Panel number 012.I.V.)

== History ==
=== Series creation ===
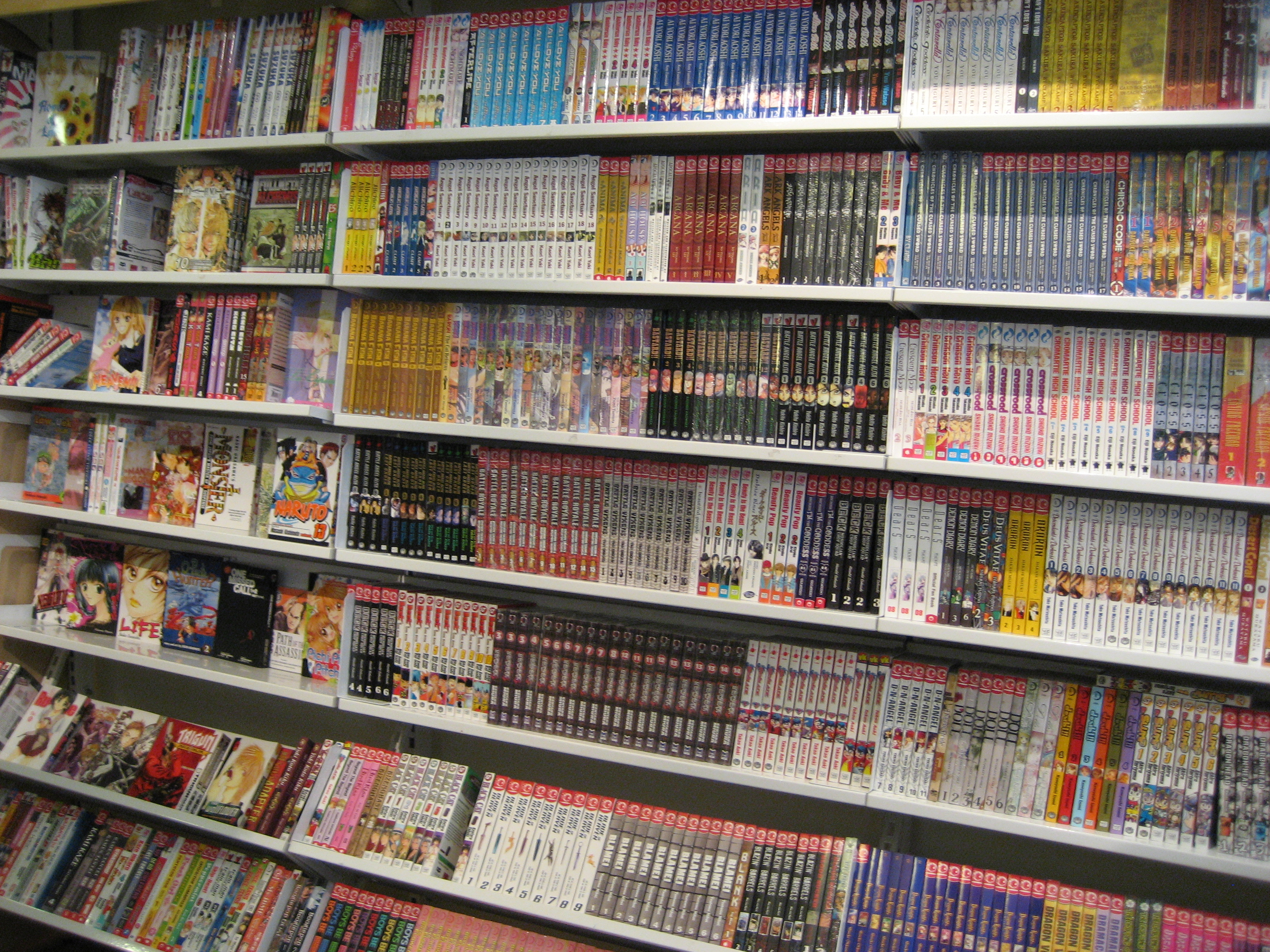
Manga has been a great source of inspiration for authors.

From 1990 to 1992, the Akira manga was published in France by Glénat Éditions, followed by the release of its animated film adaptation on May 8, 1991. The latter quickly became a "cult" film, helping the printed version to win public and critical acclaim. Building on this success, Glénat launched an "Akira" collection, translating Seinen manga from their American adaptations like they did for Akira. It includes Masamune Shirow's Appleseed and Ghost in the Shell series, as well as Yukito Kishiro's Battle Angel Alita. At the end of 1993, Jean-Claude Camano, director of this “Akira” collection, launched French series in this style. The first title is Nomad by Jean-David Morvan, Sylvain Savoia and Philippe Buchet.

In 1994, Jean-Claude Camano received a portfolio from young cartoonist Kevin Hérault, aka Trantkat. He was a big fan of manga, including titles published by Glénat at the time. A self-taught draughtsman, he took part in the fanzine Tsunami published by Tonkam.

Kevin Hérault approached the publisher with a science-fiction project he had been developing since his teens, based on a role-playing game. At the request of Kevin Hérault, who was concerned about his ability to structure his story properly, Jean-Claude Camano teamed up novice scriptwriter Jean-David Morvan with the artist's project. The HK series was then put on track. This collaboration gave rise to the first complete HK series: three volumes in “manga” format, with at least one hundred and thirty-six panels, in 1996 (Avalon (Note: Avalon is the name of the planet on which the first four volumes are set. The name was given in reference to the mythical island of Avalon.)), 1997 (Paradiso (Note: Paradiso is the name of the cinema squatted by Karl and Cedrick. The name is a reference to the 1989 film Cinema Paradiso.)) and 1998 (Balaena Nûn (Note: Balaena Nūn is the name of the starship where Karl does his training. The name is a reference to the whale shark and the letter Nun, the twenty-fifth letter of the Arabic alphabet.)). Kevin Hérault drew over a hundred pages a year at Atelier 510 TTC, a graphic design studio in Reims.

Exhausted by the studio's fast pace, Hérault returned to the Paris region to draw Tutti frutti for Delcourt in 1999 and Agapé for the publisher Vents d'Ouest in 2001. Morvan, meanwhile, devoted himself to a new science-fiction series: Sillage for Wake.

=== Format change ===
In 2001, Glénat decided to discontinue the "Akira" collection and change the format of the HK series, the only one of the three French series in the collection to continue. Massilia, (Note: Massilia is the name of the asteroid where Karl is garrisoned. The name was given in reference to the city of Marseille, whose ancient name was Massilia. The city's spaceport is called Marignane, like the Marseille airport, and the train station is called Saint-Charles, like the Marseille train station.) the first volume of the second series, was published in Franco-Belgian format. The commercial success of the latter was far greater than that of the previous volumes. As a result, Glénat plans to reissue the three volumes of one hundred and thirty-six panels from the first series, in six volumes of sixty-eight pages each. Kevin Hérault was not against the idea of this reissue, but he did not want the volumes to be simply an enlargement of the original material, with pagination divided into halves. It was also during the creation of the Massilia volume that Kevin Hérault decided to write the rest of the series on his own. He notes that “If we stopped collaborating, it was my own choice: at a certain point, I considered that we were no longer on the same wavelength in terms of the directions the story was going to take, and above all in terms of the directing principles we were going to apply to it. I also felt that I had matured enough to take my own solo flight". Starting with this volume, Hérault also did the paintwork, which had previously been done by the Color Twins duo.

In 2003, Kevin Hérault began the redesign work required for the reissue. This work essentially involved reorganizing the sections, “re-coloring” the first two volumes and creating new panels. In 2007, four of the six volumes planned for the reissue were released. Health problems prevented Kevin Hérault from releasing the other two volumes at the same time. The fifth volume was finally released at the end of 2012, but was not followed by the sixth, which was to conclude the reissue of the first series.

=== Volume 0 project ===
A volume 0 was also considered during the creative process. It was to look back at the important passages in Karl's life before the arrival of Axe. In particular, the volume was to include a scene about Karl's work accident: "The idea was to tell the story of Karl's and Cedrick's childhood, and their family, in sketches retracing important passages in their lives. The volume was to open with Karl's birth, and end with the moment when he and Cedrick decided to found their gang of thieves, after such important events as: “the departure of Cedrick's father when he was eight years old, the death of Karl's older brother, the school and college years, with the first fights and the first love affairs of the two boys”. However, Kevin Hérault preferred to put this edition aside to concentrate on the rest of the series.

=== Continuation of the series ===
The second series was supposed to focus on humanity's war against a nation of aliens. The Massilia volume (2.1) shows Karl's daily life as a soldier in a barracks. 2.2 was to develop secondary characters, leaving Karl more in the background. 2.3 presented the start of the war, focusing on starship battles. 2.4 was to focus on land battles. Volumes 2.5 and 2.6 recounted the misadventures of characters caught up in trench warfare similar to that of the First World War. The third series, was to be set on Earth, which had become an elitist and affluent world, in stark contrast to the situation on the planet Avalon.

== Analysis ==
=== Inspirations ===
==== Scenario ====
HK is above all a journey of initiation. The hero is introduced as he emerges from adolescence, evolving and growing as the stories unfold. The second series presents the pleasures of youth: outings with friends and romantic liaisons, followed by the abrupt entry into adulthood with the outbreak of war. Although set in a space opera-style science-fiction universe, HK is also a blend of genres, featuring a futuristic society with contemporary architecture.

The first HK series is dark and pessimistic, and above all the origin of the antihero Karl Hollister. As the story unfolds, the reader learns more and more about Karl's tormented character. In volume 1.5, the authors place their hero in a prison universe where strict rules lead to the creation of perfect soldiers. Paradoxically, this universe of men is surrounded by women with a Venus Callipyge physique. They are matriarchs, guardians of order and sources of knowledge. The end of the series, on the other hand, is less psychological and more action-oriented.

The beginning of the second series, on the other hand, is lighter. It focuses on Karl's relationships of love and friendship as a common soldier in garrison. The author also sets up a parallel detective story. After Karl, the other presence that dominates the series is Axe. Like the Federation, the military organization that rules humanity in the science-fiction film Starship Troopers (1997), Axe is a utopian, cynical and violent authoritarian regime. It has no hesitation in manipulating naive heroes.

To set up the story, Kevin Hérault avoids the use of explanatory flashbacks and speech bubbles. For him, this narrative facility "serves to tell the story rather than to set the scene". The narrative is therefore totally linear.

==== Designs ====
Kevin Hérault claims the influence of Japanese artist Masamune Shirow, creator of the Appleseed manga. But also other Japanese artists such as Katsuhiro Ōtomo, author of Akira, and Ikuto Yamashita, illustrator of Neon Genesis Evangelion. On the French side, he draws his inspiration from Martin Veyron and The Incal by Moebius and Alejandro Jodorowsky, from which he gets the idea for the animal-headed characters. The drawing is also similar to the American comic Weapon Zero. It is a meeting point for many influences from different cultures.

The way Kevin Hérault curves his figures gives an impression of speed in the movements. This creates a cinematic quality that allows readers to admire the drawing and color work. This work is often enhanced by transparency effects. The shape of the figures is also accentuated and smoothed.

=== Cultural references ===
==== Consumption products ====
HK series contain numerous references to typically French consumer products, notably through old posters (Banania chocolate powder, (Note: Panel number 009.I.I.) L'Alsacienne cookies, Cinzano aperitif, (Note: Panel number 016.I.II.) La vache qui rit processed cheese, Maggi cubes and Lanvin chocolate) or by the presence of the products themselves (BN chocos, (Note: Panel number 020.I.II.) Carrefour plastic bags, (Note: Panel number 011.I.IV.) Fnac stores, (Note: Panel number 015.I.IV.) Pépito cookies, (Note: Panel number 024.II.I.) La Poste calendars, (Note: Panel number 007.I.II.) Teisseire syrups and the TV Magazine program (Note: Panel number 006.I.I.)).

==== Cultural ====
The series also includes cultural allusions to a number of French personalities from the 1980s–1990s, such as television host Patrick Poivre d'Arvor, here renamed Patrick Sel d'Armor, illusionist Garcimore (in the third volume, the train station where Lola takes the train is called Cimore, "Gare" in French, French pronunciation: [gaʀ], means "Station"), (Note: Panel number 014.I.III.) singer-songwriter Gérald de Palmas (Note: Panel number 003.I.III.) and racing cyclist Jeannie Longo. (Note: Panel number 047.I.III.) Television hosts Jean-Luc Delarue (Note: Panel number 004.I.V.) and Michel Field serve as visual models for Ophélie Summer's cameraman and editor-in-chief, who was inspired by singer and TV host Ophélie Winter.

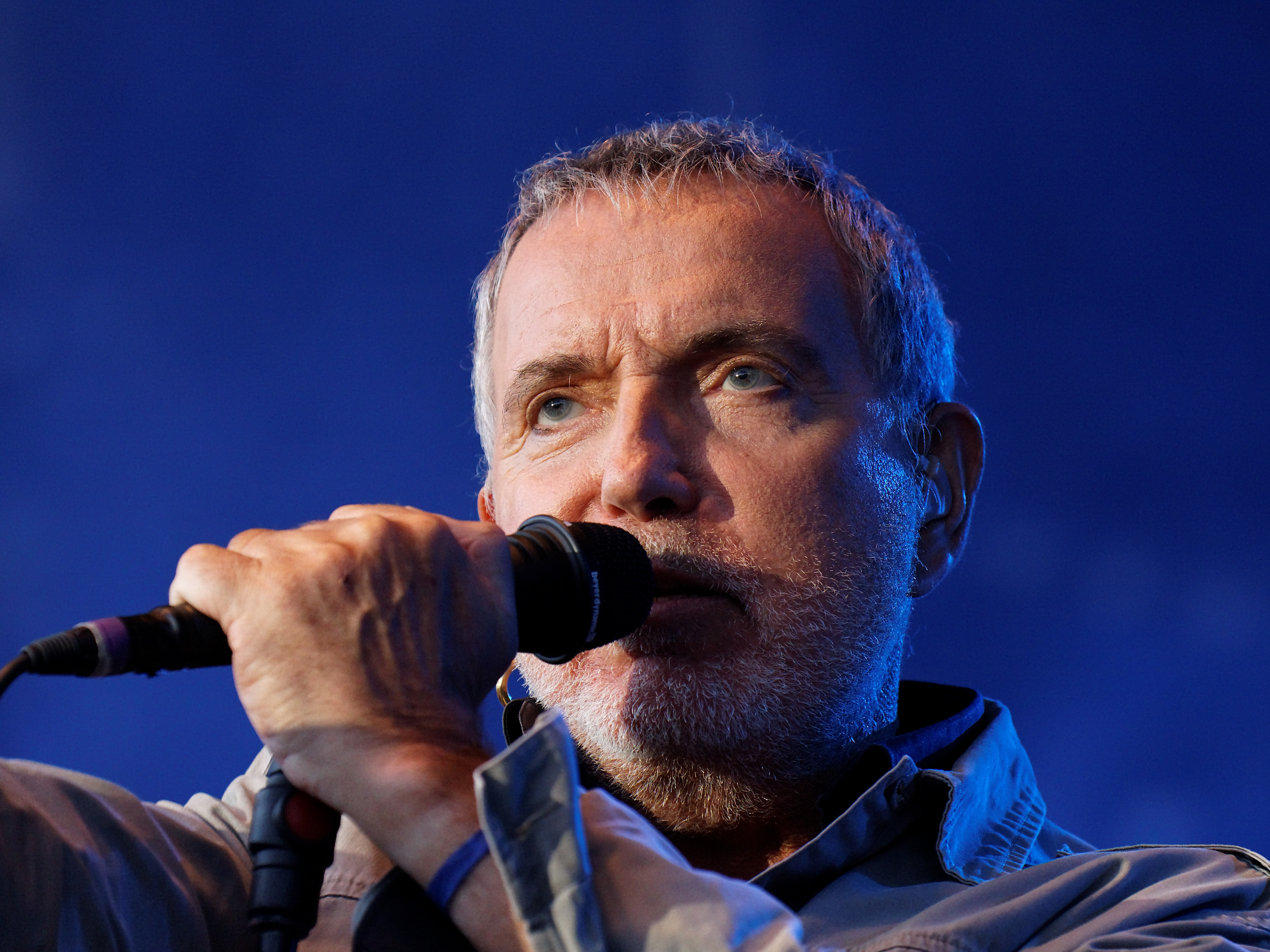
A Bernard Lavilliers song is featured on the first page of the first four volumes.

The first page of the first four "redux" volumes also features the lyrics of different Bernhard Lavilliers songs. In the volume Avalon, it reads La peur (1979, album Pouvoirs), in Élysée is Utopia (1978, album T'es vivant...?), in Caldera is Fensch Vallée (1976, album Les Barbares) and in Paradiso is Frères de la côte (1979, album Pouvoirs). For the fifth volume, the quotation gives way to a foreword signed by comic strip artist Bastien Vivès.

Other references are scattered throughout the volumes. For example, the fence Lola and Anton contact is named Ōtomo, after the creator of the manga Akira. (Note: Panel number 042.I.III.) The train station where Lola gets off is called Ogori-Iyeult, in reference to the refrain of Georges Brassens' song Le Gorille (Gare au gori-i-i-i-lle, or "Watch out out for the gorilla" in English). (Note: Panel number 017.I.III.) The representative of the Fifth column that Ademar Sterling meets is named Jean Moulin, after the famous French Resistance fighter. (Note: Panel number 020.I.IV.) In Massilia, the bar is called L'Assommoir and Karl's landlady is called Gervaise, after the heroine of Émile Zola's novel L'Assommoir (1877). (Note: Panel number 006.II.I.)

== Reception ==
Internet users on the bdtheque site give the HK series an average score of 3,42 on a scale of 5, and Bédéthèque users an average score of 4.2 on a scale of 5. Generally speaking, critics consider the series to be good, even wonderful. The redesign, for its part, was considered positive. According to the author, the initial reception from the public and comics professionals was mainly negative, particularly because of the manga's association with Franco-Belgian comics.

The script is recognized as well conceived but lacking in originality. Volume 1.5. is seen as cold, long and “a bit talkative.” Volume 2.1 is calmer, with a detective story theme. On the whole, critics admit that the plot twists are abundant and surprising. The universe is deemed credible, the hero endearing, and the other characters, while not original, are seen as well-designed.

Kevin Hérault's drawing is unanimously recognized as beautiful, convincing and dynamic, even having “expressionist effects”. Movement and rhythm are perfectly mastered by the designer, and the characters' faces are “particularly expressive”. The colors of the manga versions are sometimes criticized for being too smooth. The colors of the “redux” volumes are judged to be better executed, particularly in terms of fading and volume printing.

Responding to criticism that he drew mostly women with large breasts, Kévin Hérault points out that there was “only one character with huge breasts”. He admits that “the two characters in question have very large breasts, (Note: Eucharistie Asumita and Gabrielle Rasczak.) but that the size of their breasts ‘exists in real life’, although it's rare. He also declares that he “tries to vary the morphotypes of his sexy chicks". In conclusion, he admits that he has a fetish for large breasts, and that he already "holds back enough" for his taste. Several readers also criticize the artist for nudity and overlong sex scenes.

== Sales ==
In June 2014, sales of albums in the Franco-Belgian format ranged from 21,600 for 2.1 to 5,000 for 1.5:

== Publication ==
Initially, the complete HK series was supposed to consist of 15 volumes spread over 5 series of 3 volumes of 136 plates each, in “manga" format. The reissue of the first three series in a Franco-Belgian format forced the author to reconsider this division. He then envisaged 4 series of 6 volumes of 72 plates.

=== Manga format ===
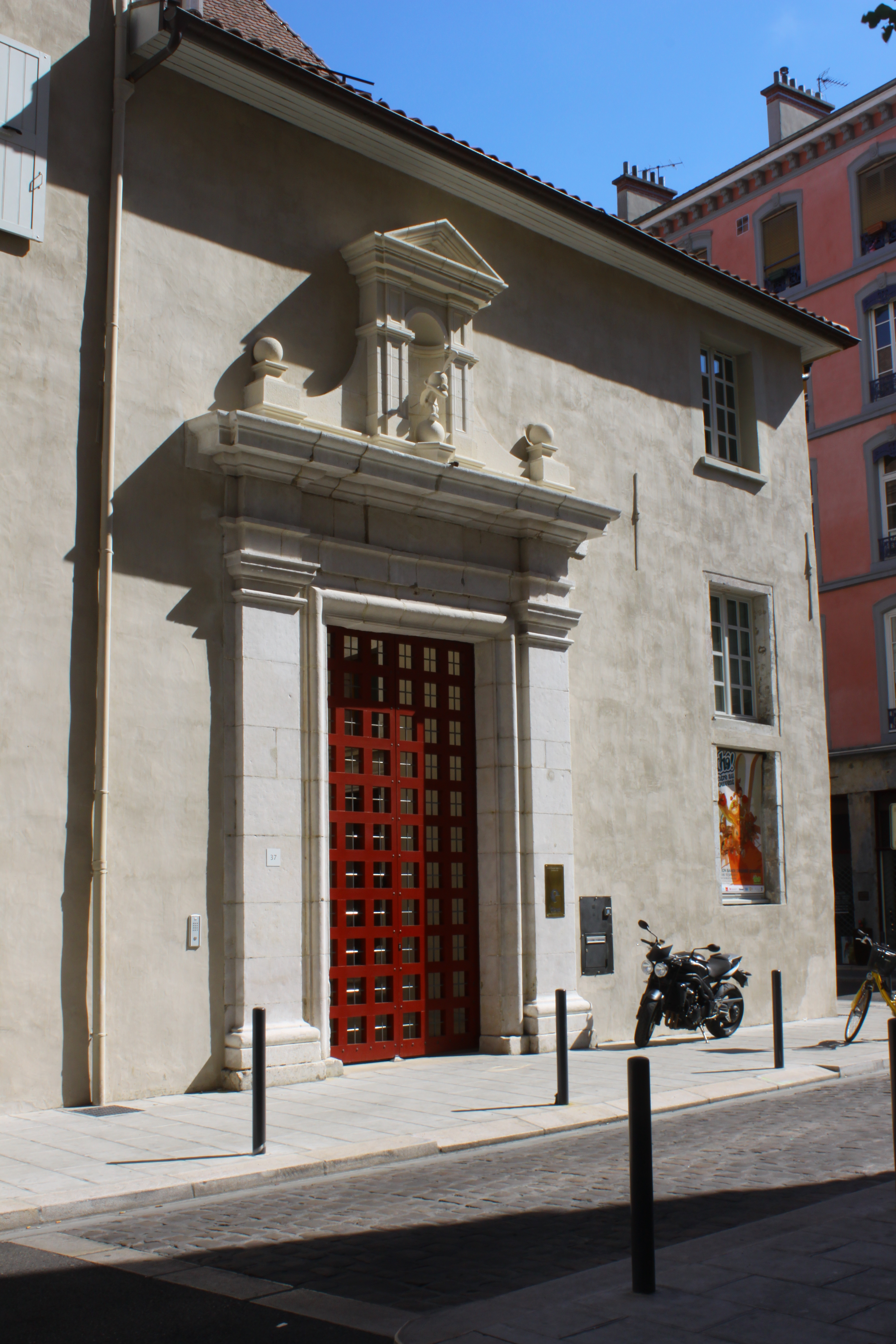
Headquarters of Glénat in Grenoble, HK's French publisher.

Glénat Éditions publishes the manga version of the first series in French and Spanish in the Akira collection. It consists of the 136-plate volume Avalon (May 1996), the 142-plate volume Paradiso (June 1997) and the 136-plate volume Balaena Nūn (September 1998).

In Germany, Splitter published the series from 1996 to 1999. However, the first two volumes were divided into several separate editions (Avalon into three and Paradisio into four). In the Netherlands, HK was published by Arboris from 1996 to 1999. Each volume of the original edition is divided into four volumes. The first is divided under the titles of Avalon, Cedrick, Lola and Karl, the second under Paradiso, Anton, Onder de knoet (“Under the Whip”) and Vaarwel Avalon (“Farewell Avalon”), and the third under Balaena Nûn, Brunner, Buuhalis and Lahaag.

=== Franco-Belgian format ===
For the large-format Franco-Belgian version in the “Grafica” collection, and under the name redux, (Note: A Latin adjective meaning “brought back”.) the volumes' colors have been entirely recreated. The Avalon and Paradiso volumes also benefited from the addition of 8 and 7 previously unpublished pages respectively, and were divided into four separate volumes: Avalon, Élysée, (Note: Élysée is the name of the mountain where conciliator Ademar Sterling's residence is located. The name was given in reference to the Élysée Palace.) Caldera (Note: Caldera is the name of the large extraction mine where Karl had his accident. The name was given in reference to a caldera, a circular volcanic depression.) and Paradiso. The Balaena Nūn volume consists of 52 plates, condensing the first 80 plates from the original edition and 19 previously unpublished plates. The sixth volume was intended to include around 30 unpublished plates because Hérault felt that this action-packed section read too quickly. He therefore wanted to add new sequences.

Kevin Hérault was also planning to rework the first volume of the second series, adding 8 new pages for a total of 71 plates, as with the other volumes in the new edition. 18 plates for the second volume of the second series were also drawn in 2004.

=== Francophone bibliography ===
Volumes sorted by year of publication:

- Kevin Hérault and Jean-David Morvan (w), Kevin Hérault (a). "1 Avalon" HK (1996). Grenoble: Glénat, ISBN 978-2-7234-2012-9, (in French).
- Kevin Hérault and Jean-David Morvan (w), Kevin Hérault (a). "2 Paradiso" HK (1997). Grenoble: Glénat, ISBN 978-2-7234-2236-9, (in French).
- Kevin Hérault and Jean-David Morvan (w), Kevin Hérault (a). "3 Balaena Nûn" HK (1998). Grenoble: Glénat, ISBN 978-2-7234-2570-4, (in French).
- Kevin Hérault (w, a). "2.1 Massilia" HK (2001). Grenoble: Glénat, ISBN 978-2-7234-3145-3, (in French).
- Kevin Hérault and Jean-David Morvan (w), Kevin Hérault (a). "1.1 Avalon" HK (2004). Grenoble: Glénat, ISBN 978-2-7234-3945-9, (in French).
- Kevin Hérault and Jean-David Morvan (w), Kevin Hérault (a). "1.2 Élysée" HK (2005). Grenoble: Glénat, ISBN 978-2-7234-3946-6, (in French).
- Kevin Hérault and Jean-David Morvan (w), Kevin Hérault (a). "1.3 Caldera" HK (2005). Grenoble: Glénat, ISBN 978-2-7234-3947-3, (in French).
- Kevin Hérault and Jean-David Morvan (w), Kevin Hérault (a). "1.4 Paradiso" HK (2007). Grenoble: Glénat, ISBN 978-2-7234-3948-0, (in French).
- Kevin Hérault and Jean-David Morvan (w), Kevin Hérault (a). "1.5 Balaena Nûn" HK (2012). Grenoble: Glénat, ISBN 978-2-7234-3949-7, (in French).
