= Ravage =

Ravage may refer to:

== Arts and entertainment ==
=== Novels ===
- Ashes, Ashes (French: Ravage), a 1943 novel by René Barjavel
  - Ashes, Ashes (comic book) (French: Ravage), a 2016–2021 comic adaptation of Barjavel's novel

=== Other comics ===
- Ravage 2099, a fictional superhero, set in the far future, from Marvel Comics
- Ravage (Marvel Comics), a fictional villain in Marvel Comics and one of the Hulk's enemies
- Ravager (comics), name of five fictional comic book characters in the DC Universe
- The Ravagers (comics), a group of superpowered teens in DC Comics

=== Other ===
- Ravage (film), 2019 American horror film
- Ravage (EP), 2023 EP by Rema

== People ==
- Marcus Eli Ravage (1884–1965), journalist, essayist, biographer

== See also ==
- Ravager (disambiguation)
