= Savard =

Savard is a French surname. Notable people with the surname include:

- André Savard (politician) (1911–1997), French politician
- André Savard (born 1953), Canadian ice hockey player
- David Savard (born 1990), Canadian ice hockey player
- Denis Savard (born 1961), Canadian ice hockey player and coach
- Edmond Savard (1862–1925), Canadian physician and politician
- Ernest Savard, Canadian stock broker
- Félix-Antoine Savard (1896–1982), Canadian priest, academic, poet, novelist, and folklorist
- Francine Savard (born 1954), Canadian artist
- Jean Savard (born 1957), Canadian ice hockey player
- Jeannine Savard, American poet
- Joe Savard (1890–1961), Canadian ice hockey goaltender
- JoJo Savard, Canadian medium, or psychic
- Katerine Savard (born 1993), Canadian swimmer
- Manon Savard, Canadian jurist
- Marc Savard (born 1977), Canadian ice hockey player
- Marie Savard (1936–2012), Canadian writer
- Pierre Savard, Canadian businessman and politician
- Serge Savard (born 1946), Canadian ice hockey player and businessman

== Places ==
- Savard, Ontario
