= Ravage (comics) =

Ravage, in comics, may refer to:

- Ravage (Marvel Comics)
- Ravage 2099
- Ashes, Ashes (comic book) (French: Ravage), a 2016–2021 comic book
