= Genin =

Genin may refer to:

- Génin, a French family name
- Genin (name), a Russian Jewish family name (Генин)
- Robert Genin, (Russian: Роберт Генин; 1884–1941), a Russian Jewish artist
- John Nicholas Genin (1819–1878), a hatter in New York City and sometime associate of P. T. Barnum
- Vladimir Genin (*1958) (Russian: Владимир Михайлович Генин), a Russian-German composer, pianist and piano teacher
- Genin, a rank of Japanese ninja
- Genin, or aglycone, the portion of a glycoside that excludes the sugar group
