= José Luis Munuera =

Spanish comics artist (born 1972)

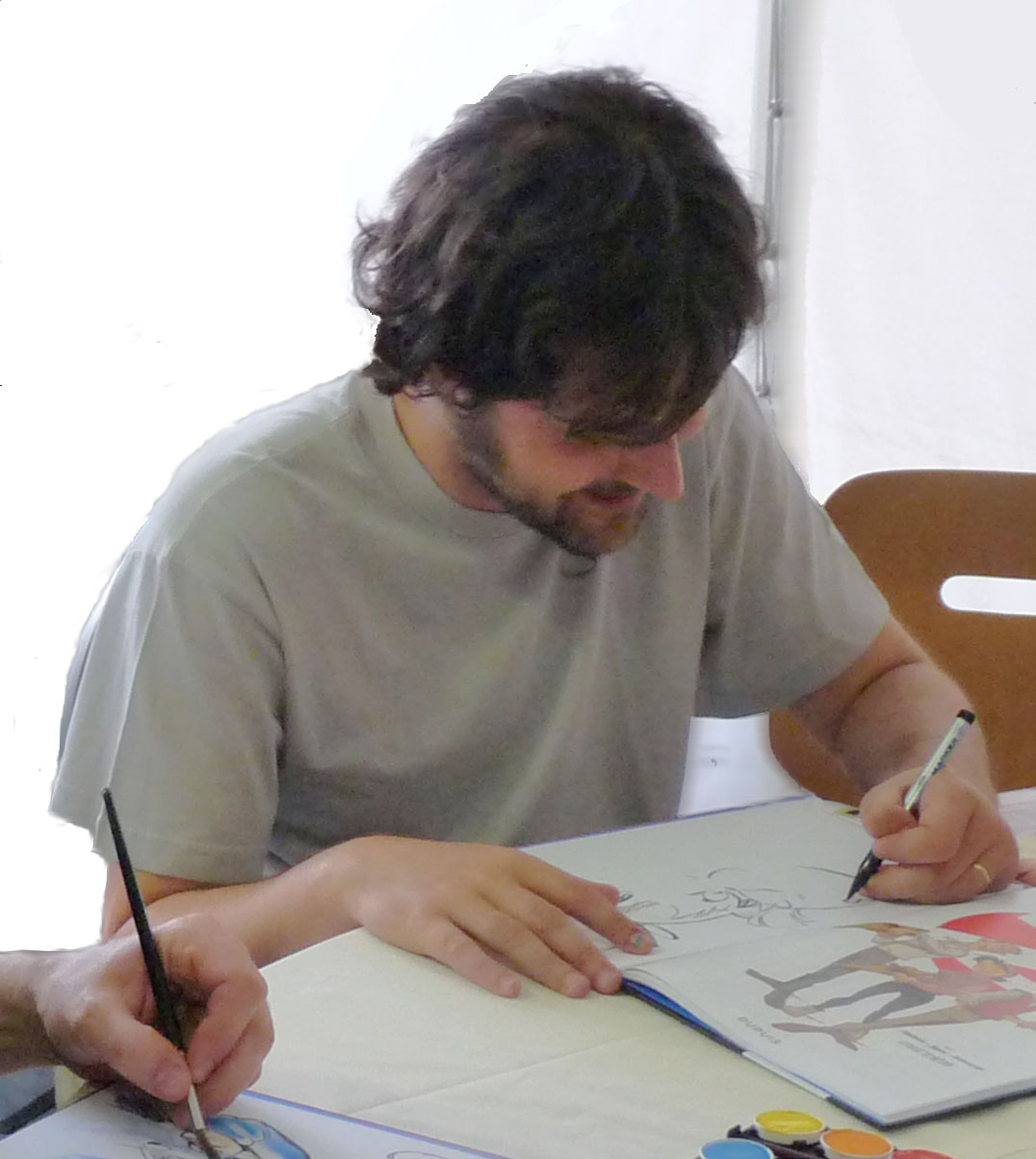
- Munuera (2009)
- Born: 21 April 1972 (age 54) Lorca
- Areas: Penciller, Inker

José Luis Munuera (born 21 April 1972, in Lorca in the region of Murcia, Spain) is a Spanish comics artist. Along with writer Jean-David Morvan, he was in charge of the classic Spirou et Fantasio series from 2004 to 2008.

Munuera kept close to the spirit of classic Spirou author Franquin's graphical style, while bringing a touch of manga-inspired modernism. Morvan and Munuera have however used background elements and secondary characters from the whole history of the title, and not just from Franquin's period.

Munuera is also the artist on the children's comic series Nävis, a spin-off of Philippe Buchet's science fiction series Wake.
