= Ravager =

Ravager or Ravagers may refer to:

== Fictional entities ==
- Ravager (DC Comics), a DC comics character
  - The Ravagers (comics), a team name
- Ravager, a starship in Star Wars: Knights of the Old Republic II – The Sith Lords
- HMS Ravager, a ship of the Royal Navy
- The Ravagers, a faction of space marauders in the Guardians of the Galaxy films and TV series.
- Ravager, a mob from Minecraft
- Ravagers (Marvel Cinematic Universe), an interstellar crime syndicate in the Marvel Cinematic Universe

== Media ==
- The Ravagers (novel), a 1964 novel by Donald Hamilton featuring secret agent Matt Helm
- Ravager (film), a 1997 film starring Bruce Payne
- Ravagers (film), a 1979 film directed by Richard Compton and based on the novel by Robert Edmond Alter
- The Ravagers (film), a 1965 film directed by Eddie Romero
- "The Ravagers" (Marvel Studios: Legends), an episode of Marvel Studios: Legends

== See also ==
- Ravage (disambiguation)
