= Aquablue =

French science fiction bande dessiné series

- Original cover art of Aquablue, showing Nao and his wife Mi-Nuee

Publication information
- Publisher: Delcourt
- Formats: Original material for the series has been published as a set of graphic novels.
- Original language: French
- Genre: Science fiction
- Publication date: April 1988 – 2025
- Number of issues: 20
- Main character(s): Nao (Wilfried Morgenstern); Cybot; Mi-Nuee

Creative team
- Writer(s): Thierry Cailleteau
- Artist(s): Olivier Vatine; Ciro Tota; Stéphane Brangier

Reprints
- The series has been reprinted, at least in part, in Dutch, English, German, and Polish.

Aquablue is a French science fiction bande dessinée series by writer Thierry Cailleteau with several artists, Olivier Vatine (first volumes) and Ciro Tota (middle volumes) and Stéphane Brangier ('Siro', latest volumes). An adventure and military-based series, it also features ecological themes and criticism of colonial exploitation. Much of the series has been translated into German and parts into English.

== Plot ==
Aquablue centers around the adventures of Wilfried Morgenstern, also known as Nao, a young Human orphan and one of the few survivors of the White Star cruise spaceliner wreck. Growing up on a space lifeboat with only Cybot (robotic nurse) to care for him, he eventually arrives on Aquablue, a planet almost totally covered by water. Arriving on the surface, Uruk-Uru – a gigantic manta ray-shaped whale – takes an interest in him before disappearing back into the depths of the sea.

Taken in by the indigenous blue-skinned humanoid natives on the planet who see in him a messenger of their gods due to the visitation of Uruk-Uru, he grows up one of their own. Eventually he becomes a strong young man, skilled at swimming, diving and fishing to non-human levels, even though he has neither gills nor other water-adaptions the locals possess. His abilities, strength, ingenuity, creativity, as well as the friends he makes during his adventures, help him overcome the challenges he faces during the series.

== Volumes ==
=== Aquablue, Cycle I: Volumes 1–5 ===
Eventually, Nao's idyll is shattered shortly after his coming-of-age, when a Terran company, Texas Energy Consortium AKA 'Texec', supported by new colonial policies back on Earth, decides to use Aquablue as a location for special power plants feeding on the ocean's warmth. If they aren't stopped, they would eventually cause the planet to glaciate, as well as destroy the native life and culture.

With the help of his native friends, a repaired Cybot and some Human sympathizers disillusioned by the ruthless colonial expansion, he decides to fight back at the intruders. However, they are guarded by private military contractors from a powerful mercenary private army - 'Morgenstern Brigades', owned and led by Nao's aunt, Ulla Morgenstern, who inherited billions from Nao's parents when they died on the White Star.

The original series chronicles the fight against the invaders, on Aquablue, in space and in the courtrooms of Earth, where Nao tries to regain his inheritance. Numerous setbacks occur, with Nao and the natives losing several major battles, but always eventually being rescued by new allies or their own skill and ingenuity.

The first four volumes were drawn by Vatine, before Tota took over in the last volume.

=== Aquablue, Cycle II: Volumes 6–7 ===
This short series, set after the conclusion of the fight for Aquablue (and not actually on the planet itself) chronicles the adventures of Nao and his friends as they discover the secret of why the White Star crashed in an asteroid field. Introducing a number of new settings in the Aquablue universe (which was previously mostly restricted to Earth and Aquablue), it also features a number of new point-of-view characters.

=== Aquablue, Cycle III: Volumes 8–9 ===
After the original storyline is wrapped up by volume 7, Nao uses his inherited fortune to create the Aquablue Foundation, with the goal of stellar exploration and the protection of native societies and lifeforms. In one of the first volumes, he works to secure specimens of indigenous lifeforms before a stellar catastrophe destroys a remote planet. However, rich big-game hunters who've come to shoot trophies on the doomed planet soon cause problems.

=== Aquablue, Cycle IV: Volumes 10–11 ===
The activity of the Aquablue Foundation brings Nato to the planet Tetlaan in order to bring material that will allow the archaeological excavations in progress to take a decisive step.

=== Aquablue, Cycle V: Volumes 12–17 ===
The series was rebooted 2011, with the writer Régis Hautière and the artist Reno

=== Aquablue, Cycle V: Volumes 18–20 ===
Script by Thierry Cailleteau and Fred Duval, artwork by Stéphane Louis.

== Visual style ==
Partial page from Volume 4, Black Corals, drawn by Vatine, showing the heroes' spacecraft arriving at an Aquablue island.

The series is drawn in an action-oriented French style, though there are obvious changes with the different artists the series has had, with Tota's style being slightly more manga-inspired than the more realistic drawing of Vatine. Siro's style in the latest volumes is more reminiscent of Tota than of Vatine.

== Awards ==
Aquablue received the Prix Jeunesse 9-12 ans (Youth Prize, 9-12 age category) at the Angoulême International Comics Festival in 1989.

== In video games ==
In 2004, it was announced that game studio Kylotonn was developing an action-adventure video game for PC based on the comic. Entitled Aquablue: The Game, it was to be released 31 December 2004. Apparently, no finished game was ever produced, and the developer does not list it on its website (2007).
