= Delcourt (publisher) =

French publishing company

- Founded: 1986
- Founder: Guy Delcourt
- Country of origin: France
- Headquarters location: Paris, Île-de-France
- Key people: Guy Delcourt, publisher Jean-David Morvan, collection director
- Fiction genres: Bandes déssinées, comics
- Official website: www.editions-delcourt.fr

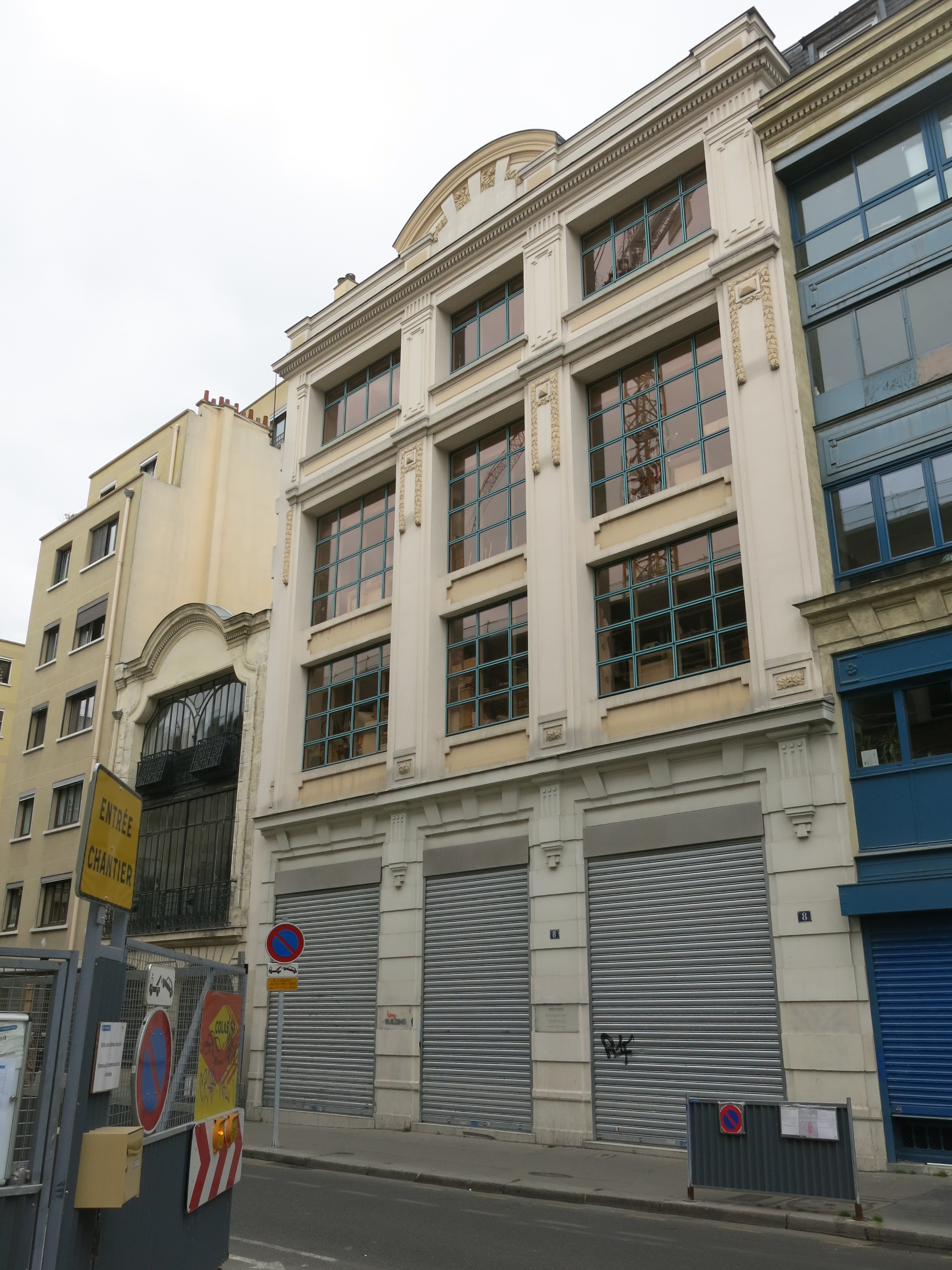
Delcourt head office

Delcourt (French: [dɛlkuʁ]) is a French publishing house that specializes in comics and manga founded in 1986 through the fusion of the magazines Charlie Mensuel and Pilote. Guy Delcourt, chief editor of the latter, named the new publishing house Guy Delcourt Productions.

Delcourt is the third largest publisher of Franco-Belgian comics, behind Média-Participations and Glénat, and produces some 480 comics a year.

== Publications ==
=== Bandes Dessinées (Franco-Belgian comics) ===
==== Delcourt ====
- À l'Ombre de l'Échafaud (since 2001)
- Aquablue (since 1988)
- Amenophis IV (since 2000)
- Asphodèle
- Angela
- Après la Nuit (since 2008)
- Baker Street
- Beowulf
- Bienvenue chez les Ch'tis
- Bienvenue en Chine
- C.O.P.S.
- Ceux qui rampent
- Chasseurs de Dragons
- Chronicles of The Dragon Knights
- CryoZone (from 1996 to 2005)
- De Cape et de Crocs (since 1995)
- Desk
- Donjon (since 1998)
- Dwarves
- Elves
- Felicidad
- Gibier de Potence (since 2001)
- Histoires de Mecs et de Nanas (since 2009)
- Le Dieu Singe
- Les Légendaires (since 2004)
- Les Lumières de l'Amalou (from 1990 to 1997)
- Okko (since 2005)
- Sillage (1998 – present) with Nävis and Les Chroniques de Sillage
- The Chronicles Of Legion
- The Snake and The Spear

==== Series B ====
- Arcanes (since 1998)
- Arcane Majeure (since 2003)
- Carmen McCallum with Code McCallum (since 1995)
- Carmen+Travis (crossover - from 2003 to 2005)
- Golden City with Golden Cup
- Le Grand Jeu
- L'Histoire Secrète
- Météors
- Nash (since 1997)
- Showergate (since 2007)
- Tao Bang (since 1999)
- Travis with Travis Karmatronics (since 1997)
- Zentak (from 1997 to 1999)

=== Comics (American-British comics) ===
- 30 Jours de Nuit
- Black Hole (French edition, 2007)
- Au Cœur de la Tempête (1991 - French ed 2009)
- Mon Dernier Jour au Vietnam (2000 - French ed 2001)
- Down (2007)
- Echo
- Elektra (formerly - now published by Panini)
- Les enquêtes de Sam & Twitch
- Fagin le Juif (2003)
- Fathom with Fathom Origins
- Freshmen (2007)
- From Hell (2000)
- Girls (2006–present)
- The Goon (since 1999 - French ed since 2005)
- Hard Boiled
- HellBoy with B.P.R.D
- Hunter Killer (2005 - French ed since 2006)
- Indiana Jones
- Invincible (French edition, 2005 – present)
- I Never Liked You Je ne t'ai jamais aimé (French edition since 2010)
- Jinx (2006)
- Love & Rockets
- The Little Man Le Petit Homme (French edition, 2009)
- Madame Mirage (French edition, since 2009)
- Les Maîtres de l'Évasion
- Martha Washington (formerly)
- Necromancer (2006)
- Sandman (formerly - now published by Panini)
- ShockRockets (formerly)
- Soulfire (since 2007)
- Spawn with Les Chroniques de Spawn
- Star Wars (since 1999)
- Savage Dragon (since 2010)
- Supreme (since 2003)
- Swamp Thing (formerly)
- Tomb Raider (1999-2005 - French ed 2009)
- Trese (French edition, 2022)
- V pour Vendetta (1990 - Formerly)
- Walking Dead (since 2007)
- Wanted (2008)
- WitchBlade since #70 (French edition, 2008 – present)

=== Manga (Delcourt/Akata) ===
- Accords parfaits
- Amours Félines
- Après l'Amour
- Ascension
- Au bord de l'eau
- Ayako
- Baki
- Barbara
- Beck
- Berry Dynamite
- BX
- Ceux qui ont des ailes
- Charisma
- Comme Elles
- Suppli (Complément affectif)
- Coq de Combat
- Déclic Amoureux
- Demain les oiseaux
- Démons et chimères
- Dernier Soupir
- Dead Tube
- Freak Island
- Dororo
- Dreamin' Sun
- Effleurer le Ciel
- L'Empreinte du mal
- Enfant Soldat
- L'Etrange petite Tatari
- La Femme défigurée
- Les Fils de la Terre
- Flic à Tokyo
- La Force des Humbles
- Fragment
- Fruits Basket
- Girlfriend
- Global Garden
- Gogo Monster
- Gokinjo
- Heads
- Histoires d'Asie et d'Ailleurs
- Histoires pour tous
- Imbéciles heureux !
- L'Incident de Sakai et Autres Récits Guerriers
- Initiation
- Intrigues au Pays du Matin Calme
- Inugami
- Je ne suis pas mort
- Je ne suis pas un ange
- Jornada
- Journaliste
- Kajô
- Karakuri Circus
- Ki-itchi !!
- Kiômaru
- Kirihito
- Kurozakuro
- Les Lamentations de l'Agneau
- Larme Ultime
- Last Quarter
- Le Cocon
- La Légende de Songoku
- Liselotte et la forêt des sorcières
- Lollipop
- Love Tic
- Lovely Complex
- Magic
- Magie intérieure !
- Maka-Maka
- Le Manoir de l'Horreur
- Mes voisins les Yamada
- Mirai no Utena
- Le Monde de Misaki
- Les Mystères de Taishô
- Nana
- Nés pour cogner
- Nico Says
- Niraikanai
- Onmyôji
- Otomen
- Le Pacte des Yôkai
- Pékin, années folles
- Persona
- Ping pong
- Princess Jellyfish
- Réincarnation
- Rivage
- Romance d'outre-tombe
- Sans Compromis
- Satsuma
- Sayûkiden
- Shibuya Love Hotel
- Sing "Yesterday" for Me
- Sous la bannière de la liberté
- Subaru
- Sweet Relax
- Switch Girl!!
- Tajikarao
- Tengu
- Tennen
- Togari
- Tsuru
- Tueur !
- Twinkle stars 星は歌う
- Un Destin Clément
- Un drôle de père
- Une sacrée mamie
- Vague à L'âme
- Les Vents de la Colère
- La Voix des fleurs
- Yakitate!! Japan
- Zatoïchi
