= André Savard (politician) =

French politician

André Savard (27 May 1911, Verdun – 25 February 1997) was a French politician. He represented the French Communist Party in the National Assembly from 1946 to 1951 and from 1956 to 1958.
