= Gallie =

Gallie is a surname. Notable people with the surname include:

== Notable persons ==
- Brenda Gallie, Canadian ophthalmologist
- Charles Gallie, Scottish trade union leader
- Colin Gallie, British auto racer
- George Gallie, Scottish rugby player
- John Gallie, British target shooter
- Menna Gallie, Welsh novelist
- Phil Gallie, British politician
- W. B. Gallie, Scottish philosopher
- William Gallie, Canadian surgeon

== Other uses ==
- Eau Gallie, a neighbourhood in Melbourne, Florida, United States
- Gli arabi nelle Gallie, an opera
- Saunders v Anglia Building Society, an English contract law case, also known as Gallie v Lee
