= Merlin (comics) =

Merlin, in comics, may refer to:

- Merlin (DC Comics), the DC Comics version of the Arthurian wizard
- Merlyn (DC Comics), a DC Comics supervillain and archenemy of Green Arrow
- Merlin the Magician (character), a Quality Comics superhero, a descendant of the Arthurian wizard
- Merlyn (Marvel Comics), a supporting character of Marvel Comics' Captain Britain
- Merlin (Marvel Comics), the name of several characters in Marvel Comics
- Maha Yogi, a Marvel Comics character who impersonated Merlin of Camelot and also went by the name of "Mad Merlin"

== See also ==
- Merlin (disambiguation)
