= Ashes, Ashes =

1943 novel by René Barjavel

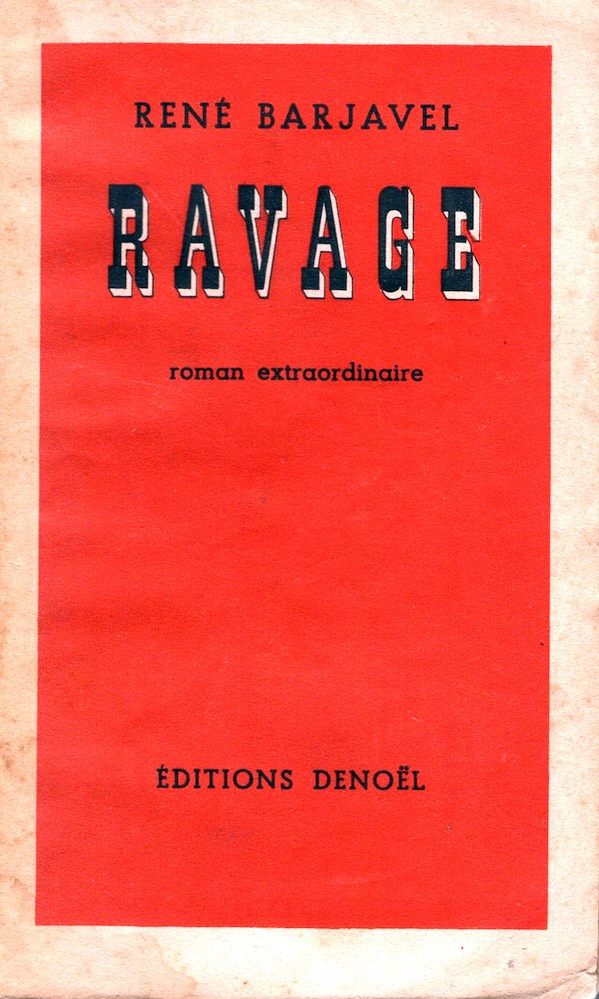
- First edition cover
- Author: René Barjavel
- Original title: Ravage
- Translator: Damon Knight
- Genre: Science fiction
- Publisher: Denoël
- Publication date: 1943

Ashes, Ashes (French: Ravage) is a science fiction novel written by René Barjavel, set in 2052 France. It was first published in 1943 by Denoël. Its English-language translation by Damon Knight as Ashes, Ashes was published in 1967 by Doubleday. Ravage has been included on many "all-time" best lists, including Annick Beguin's Les 100 principaux titres de la science-fiction.

== Plot summary ==
In the storyline, a civilization much more advanced than ours falls to its knees when electricity suddenly disappears. Chaos, disease, and famine ensue, which readers witness through the adventures of a small group of survivors led by François Deschamps. The group leaves Paris and starts a journey toward Provence where the survivors will create a new patriarchal society with Deschamps as their leader.

== Critics ==
This novel has been cited as influential in science-fiction literature in the following books:

- Annick Beguin, Les 100 principaux titres de la science-fiction, Cosmos 2000, 1981;
- Jacques Sadoul, Anthologie de la littérature de science-fiction, Ramsay, 1981;
- Science-fiction. La bibliothèque idéale, Albin Michel, 1988;
- Lorris Murail, Les Maîtres de la science-fiction, Bordas, coll. « Compacts », 1993;
- Stan Barets, Le science-fictionnaire, Denoël, coll. « Présence du futur », 1994;

== Adaptation ==
The novel was adapted into the comic book Ashes, Ashes, written by Jean-David Morvan and illustrated by Rey Macutay. It was published by Glénat Éditions in three albums in 2016, 2017 and 2021.
