= Francine Savard =

Canadian artist (born 1954)

- Born: 1954; Montreal, P.Q.
- Education: BA Université du Québec à Montréal (UQAM); certificate in Graphic Design from the Royal College of Art, London, England; Master of Plastic Arts from the UQAM.
- Known for: artist

Francine Savard (born 1954) is a Canadian artist whose paintings and installations are grounded in the Plasticien tradition. Her practice explores relationships between language and visual art. Besides painting, Savard has a career as a graphic designer.

== Career ==
Savard was born in Montreal, Quebec. Her studies include a degree in design from the Université du Québec à Montréal (UQAM); a certificate in Graphic Design from the Royal College of Art, London, England; and her Master of Plastic Arts from the UQAM.

Savard's exhibited work incorporates text, typography, colour, and structure to explore questions of language, interpretation, and classification. Since 1994 she has presented her work at the broadcast centre and the gallery at UQAM, and in many solo and group shows. A 2009 mid-career retrospective exhibition at the Musée d'art contemporain de Montréal featured 63 of Savard's works in painting and sculpture. In 2017, she was included in Entangled: Two Views on Contemporary Canadian Painting at the Vancouver Art Gallery.

== Selected public collections ==
Her work is included in the collections of the Musée d'art contemporain de Montréal, the Musée national des beaux-arts du Québec the National Gallery of Canada the Remai Modern in Saskatoon, the Robert McLaughlin Gallery, Oshawa, and the Albright-Knox Gallery in Buffalo. In Toronto, she is represented by Diaz Contemporary; in Montreal by Galerie Rene Blouin.

In 2018, she was awarded the "Prix Reconnaissance 2018", Faculté des Arts UQAM.
