= Génin =

Génin is a French surname. Notable people with the surname include:

- Jacques Génin, French chef, cookery book writer, and chocolatier
- Lucien Génin (1894–1953), French painter
- Paul Agricole Génin (1832–1903), French flautist and composer
- René Génin (1890–1967), French stage and film actor
