= Lucien Génin =

French painter (1894–1953)

Lucien Génin (9 November 1894 in Rouen – 26 August 1953 in Paris) was a French painter in the milieu of pre-World War I, 1920s Montmartre and Saint-Germain-des-Prés.
