= Ashes, Ashes (comic book) =

2016–2021 comic by Jean-David Morvan and Rey Macutay

Ashes, Ashes (Ravage)
- Page count: 144 pages
- Publisher: Glénat Éditions

Creative team
- Writer: Jean-David Morvan; after René Barjavel
- Artist: Rey Macutay

Original publication
- Issues: 3
- Date of publication: 7 September 2016; 4 October 2017; 3 March 2021
- Language: French

Translation
- Publisher: Magnetic Press
- Date: 5 October 2021
- Translator: Jeremy Melloul

Ashes, Ashes (French: Ravage) is a French comic book written by Jean-David Morvan and illustrated by Rey Macutay.

== Plot ==
The story is set after a natural phenomenon in the year 2052 made electricity disappear, causing civilisation to collapse into warring tribal bands. It is told through two temporal planes. One is right after the event as the Frenchman François Deschamps and his girlfriend Blanche struggle to adapt to the new situation in Paris. The other is much later, when two clans fight for control of France. The comic is based on the novel Ashes, Ashes by René Barjavel.

== Publication ==
Glénat Éditions published the comic in three 48-page albums on 7 September 2016, 4 October 2017 and 3 March 2021. Magnetic Press published it in English translation in 2021.
