= Wake (comics) =

Sci-fi graphic novel series

- Cover of the first issue (US version)

Publication information
- Publisher: Delcourt (France) / NBM Publishing (USA)
- Genre: Science fiction
- Publication date: 1998 – present
- No. of issues: 21 (2022)
- Main character: Navee (Nävis)

Creative team
- Written by: Jean-David Morvan
- Artist: Philippe Buchet
- Colorist: Christian Lerolle

Wake (titled Sillage in the original French) is a science fiction graphic novel series created by Jean-David Morvan and Philippe Buchet.

Wake is space opera, exploring social themes about inequalities, corruption, and colonization.

== Translations ==
The series has been translated to English and published in the United States by NBM Publishing. The issues are published in a large format (19 cm by 25.4 cm) as soft cover graphic novels. Issues 1 through 3 were published individually. Issues 4/5 and 6/7 were published together as single books. NBM Publishing have stated that they will not be publishing the remainder of the series in English in the United States.

== Origin ==
The foreword to the art book 1000 Navïs states that the series was conceived at the prompting of publisher Guy Delcourt, who wanted a space opera to add to his catalogue. Jean-David Morvan presented the name Sillage to Philippe Buchet, who conceived of the space convoy, but made them entirely alien to avoid comparisons to Battlestar Galactica. Similarly, the main character was made female to avoid comparisons to Tarzan.

== Protagonist ==
Navee in the censored American version compared to the original art; here the Finnish translation

The protagonist of the series is Navee (Nävis in the original French), a young human female who was shipwrecked and orphaned on an alien planet. She was raised from infancy by one of the ship's robots, Nsob, and has never met another human being. The series uses Navee as an outside viewer of the Wake convoy – a convoy of starships from various backgrounds that travel together – as she adjusts to life in this alien civilization.

The first volume of the series depicts the adolescent Navee topless. As a prerequisite for publication in the United States, the American publisher censored this by covering her breasts with a black felt marker in the American edition.

Navee is the only living example of humanity known to Wake. She is also unique in being neither a "psi active" nor a "psi passive"; that is, she has no telepathic abilities, but her mind cannot be read either. This lack of psionic talent of any sort comes in handy at times during the series.

Navee has white rectangular tattoos on her body. There is evidence to suggest she is not a true human being and these markings have something to do with it (Wake Vol 3;Nävis Vol 2&4).

As the series begins, Navee has survived into adolescence and all the technology on her wrecked ship has finally failed. She lives a primitive life in the jungle of her world with her companion Houyo, a sentient tiger-like being. Her idyllic life ends when agents of Wake, a traveling civilization of many different alien species, arrives to Hotta-form (analogous to xenoform) her planet for Hottard colonisation. Prior to encountering Navee, Wake had extremely limited contact with humanity.

After some first-contact friction, Navee is awarded salvage rights to her wrecked spacecraft and joins Wake with enough money to pay for her education and to commission a custom spacecraft for her to live in. When her money runs out, she goes to work for the Wake government as an agent and explorer within the Wake convoy and on technologically primitive worlds.

== Setting ==
The Wake Civilization is a vast convoy of spacecraft that constantly travel around the galaxy in search of resources, races, and technology. This convoy drops hypergates as it travels, allowing instantaneous access to previously visited star systems. It is unclear whether Wake has any faster than light capability beyond the hypergates. The Wake civilization is very old. There are hints that it has circled the galaxy many times, and revisited many stellar systems over time periods sufficient to watch civilizations rise and fall. There is also evidence that Wake has xenoformed planets and seeded life on them over a very long period of time.

As a synthesis of vast numbers of races with a long history, Wake is extremely advanced technologically. No two ships of Wake are designed the same, and some are clearly biological. Several ships and species are encountered in the convoy that are so different that communication is difficult or impossible, yet they are clearly a part of the civilization. Artificial intelligences are used everywhere, but are considered second class citizens and kept under control by the biological citizens. Advanced biological information storage and processing technologies are seen several times throughout the series.

The communication technology of Wake relies heavily on psionics, produced and manipulated by both biological and technological means. The citizens of Wake are classified by their ability to control the behavior of other beings through psionic powers and their susceptibility to control by the same means. This division of people into powerful and helpless categories is a consistent theme throughout the series. The exclusive use of psionics for communication is hinted at as one of the possible reasons why Wake and humanity have never discovered each other, as Nävis and presumably all humans are totally immune to psionic coercion and equally unable to manipulate or communicate with other beings through these means. This ability makes Nävis valuable as an intelligence agent of Wake's military, and use of this talent allows her to make a living.

== Style and subgenres ==
In an interview or commentary published in bilingual form (English and French) in a collection of his drawings (blockBuster, 2005) Buchet noted that science fiction had the peculiarity of "allowing a natural journey between past and future". The science fiction traditions of cryogenics and social manipulation at a grand scale made it possible for him and Morvan to explore the subgenre of steampunk in "gearing up", while the tradition of barbaric pre-industrial planets made an exploration of sword and sorcery possible in The Sign of the Demons.

== Publication ==
=== Volumes published ===
- 1: Fire and Ash (1998) ISBN 1-56163-267-8

Nävis lives an idyllic life on her jungle planet until an agent (of the Hotar species) of Wake comes to Hotta-form and colonize it. Nävis resists by starting a revolution among the alien workers, and then joins Wake when her planet is Hotta-formed.

- 2: Private Collection (1999) ISBN 1-56163-282-1

Nävis comes to the attention of a powerful psionic male who has used his power of compulsion to build a harem of females of all known species, except humans. She resists his attentions, sometimes violently. Nävis runs out of money and must take a job with the Wake military as an intelligence agent.

- 3: Gearing Up (2000) ISBN 1-56163-315-1

A routine check on a known world discovers a steampunk civilization whose technology is advancing impossibly fast while the people mutate into a hybrid form similar to humanity. New agent Navee is sent to discover what is happening.

- 4: The sign of the demons (2001) ISBN 1-56163-341-0

Nävis and her team of fellow Wake agents investigate the preindustrial world of Hurumaru, inhabited by many different sentient races which are known to have originated elsewhere. The inhabitants have no knowledge of Wake or of their homeworlds. The usual revolution is fomented to free the downtrodden and discover who has been planting illegal colonies.

- 5: (Note: Alien language: "my life for mine") (2002) ISBN 1-56163-341-0

Investigating terrorist attacks throughout wake leads to the discovery of the Ftross, an oppressed underclass living in squalor within the ships of the convoy itself. Nävis tries but is unable to make much progress in cleaning up the inequities of the Wake civilization.

- Special Edition: Le collectionneur (2002) ISBN 2-84055-946-3

A special chapter which takes place between chapter 5 and 6.
This album is composed by comics-part and art-parts.

- 6: Artifice (2003) ISBN 1-56163-420-4

On the way to visit her old friend Rib'Wund, Nävis' space ship is sabotaged and she crash lands on a post-apocalyptic planet. She encounters a desperate population of beings who have spent centuries at war on the brink of extinction against robots. The males are extremely protective of her, as a female (an ugly one: no whiskers), but she manages to blow apart the status quo and end the war.

- 7: Maximum (In)Security (2004) ISBN 1-56163-420-4

Nävis finally arrives at the maximum security prison ship to visit her friend Rib'Wund, only to learn the entire prison has erupted in a riot. Suspecting the riot is a cover for an assassination, Nävis infiltrates the prison and makes her way through the population of biological killing machines to find her friend.

- 8: Human Nature (2005) ISBN 2-84789-905-7

Nävis discovers a planet where other humans live and is eager to finally make contact with her own kind. However she soon learns a sad lesson about the darker sides of human nature.

- 1+2+3+4 Premières Armes (2006) ISBN 2-7560-0451-0

The first four books in one.

- 9: Infiltration (2006) ISBN 2-7560-0303-4

The Wake government had given a mission to Nävis: infiltrate a group of activist alter-universalists that seemed to prepare a big coup. She manages to earn the trust of the criminals. But right when she is about to discover their goal, her superior orders her to stop everything. She still decides to continue the mission and discovers...

- 10: Retour de Flammes (2007) ISBN 978-2-7560-0577-5

After the huge accident she triggered, Nävis is confined in her ship-home. Realizing the ship is working using psychic strength of Heiliig, she decides to bring him back to his people, living in the planet where she spent all her youth. She couldn't foresee that her past would backfire in the face.

- 11: Monde Flottant (2008) ISBN 978-2-7560-1184-4

Condemned but left free Nävis has been fired from secret services and has to rely on odd jobs. The lawyer who defended her during her trial gives her a mission: go on RiBhehn to find Bobo, lost in civil war. On RiBhehn, the feudal government was just thrown off by the emperor's loyal supporter and Wake is trying to gather a rare ore endemic to this planet.

- 12: Zone Franche (2008) ISBN 978-2-7560-1592-7

Nävis is chasing Soimitt, one of the criminals she had to face in Infiltration. She hopes to take some information from him that would help to review her trial. But the brain of the hitman is full of psychic blockers. The only way to make him talk is to go on a planet where it is impossible to lie.

- 13: Dérapage Contrôlé (2010) ISBN 978-2-7560-1997-0

Nävis takes part in illegal "Cannonball"–race, where there are no rules. It is the only way to get in contact with Bobo. Nävis finds out who funded her training to become an agent of Wake.

- 14: Liquidation Totale (2011) ISBN 978-2-7560-2433-2

Having encountered a mysterious and extremely lethal adversary, Nävis has to fight for survival.

- 15. Chasse gardée (2012) ISBN 978-2-7560-2434-9

Now working as a freelance agent, Nävis takes on a job to relocate the dangerous fauna from an asteroid. But she soon finds out not all things are what they look like.

- 16. Liés par le sang (9/2013)ISBN 978-2-7560-3262-7

Nävis has a son, Yanno, raised by her worst enemy, the consul Atsukau. Still reeling from the news, she must face an unprecedented danger facing a powerful psychic force, the entire population of East Wake diving catalepsy. Insensitive to mental powers, Nävis and her son are the only ones who can save the convoy from a fatal diversion into a black hole.

- 17. Grands froids (9/2014)

Secret mission forces Nävis back to the planet 68 Trjj, home of Yanno's father.

- 18. Psycholocauste (9/2015)

Will the council give official citizenship to humans, now that there are two of them. An extremely potent virus threats Wake.

- 19. Temps mort (9/2016)

Sillage encounters a species that can manipulate time, a skill Nävis and Booboo really need.

- 20. Mise à jour (4/2019)

A document has been recovered from ship where Nävis lived before being enlisted by Sillage. It is unknown who she is and where she come from. 20th anniversary episode.

- 21. Exfiltration (1/2022)

Floating in space, 76 corpses piled up in a box hardly space-worthy. Nävis is deeply marked and she refuses to close his eyes and lets all his humanity speak.

- 22. Transfert (1/2023)

When Nävis finally manages to get hold of the fugitive who refuses to show up for his summons, it quickly turns out that the latter is fortunate enough and has the right connections to manage to get away with it without conviction. Nävis then exceeds the limits of his charge by being more aggressive than necessary. Our favorite human is finding it increasingly difficult to bear injustice.

=== Spin-offs ===
==== Nävis ====
The story of Navee's childhood, created by José-Luis Munuera, Jean-David Morvan, Philippe Buchet, and Christian Lerolle, published by Delcourt-Neopolis. (Not yet published in English.)

- 1: Houyo (2003) – Nävis meets her friend and fellow orphan Houyo. ISBN 2-84789-158-7
- 2: Girodouss (2005) – Nävis and Houyou try to find a mate for a female predatory creature. ISBN 2-84789-818-2
- 3: Latitzoury (2007) – Nävis accidentally upsets the balance of power among the alien animals. ISBN 978-2-7560-0359-7
- 4: Il vous reste de l'énergie ? (2008) – ("You still have some energy?") To repair Nsob, Nävis goes into the wrecked spaceship and finds some of the robots are still operating. ISBN 978-2-7560-0868-4
- 5: Princesse Nävis (2009) – Navee finds a virtual reality game and creates a utopia, but then must defend it against another human child. ISBN 978-2-7560-1489-0

==== Les Chroniques de Sillage (Wake's chronicles) ====
(Morvan & Buchet + Collectif)
Short graphic novels which takes place between principal chapters, published by Delcourt-Neopolis. (Not yet published in English.)

- 1: Volume I (2004) ISBN 2-84789-334-2
- 2: Volume II (2005) ISBN 2-84789-718-6
- 3: Volume III (2006) ISBN 2-84789-829-8
- 4: Volume IV (2006) ISBN 2-7560-0169-4
- 5: Volume V (2008) ISBN 978-2-7560-0304-7
- 6: Volume VI (2008) ISBN 978-2-7560-0315-3

==== Sillage Premières Armes ====
Return to early times of Navee's debut as fresh Wake-agent. By Jean-David Morvan and Philippe Buchet (story) and Pierre-Mony Chan (illustrations), published by Delcourt-Neopolis. (Not yet published in English.)

- 1: Esprit d'équipe (6/2014) (Teamwork) Navee, surrounded by her anxious yet proud friends, gets ready for her big day. She has been tasked with other agents aspiring to serve Wake: their mission, which will serve as evaluation, is to check the proper conduct of elections on a planet with a troubled political context.
- 2: Vitesse-de-croix (10/2020) (Cruising speed) In a bartender role that serves as her cover and where she is bored to death, Nävis has infiltrated a space cruise ship to ensure her safety because many freighters mysteriously disappear without a trace. The special agent and his command believe they are dealing with simple acts of piracy, but things are rarely what they seem.
- Sillage - Premières armes - Intégrale (EAN 9782413029786)

=== Art books ===
- BlockBuster. Guy Delcourt Productions – Série B, 2005. ISBN 2-84789-949-9

(Bilingual publication of Buchet's drawing)

- 1000 Nävis. Guy Delcourt Productions, 2007. ISBN 978-2-7560-1095-3
