= Jean-David Morvan =

Belgian comics author

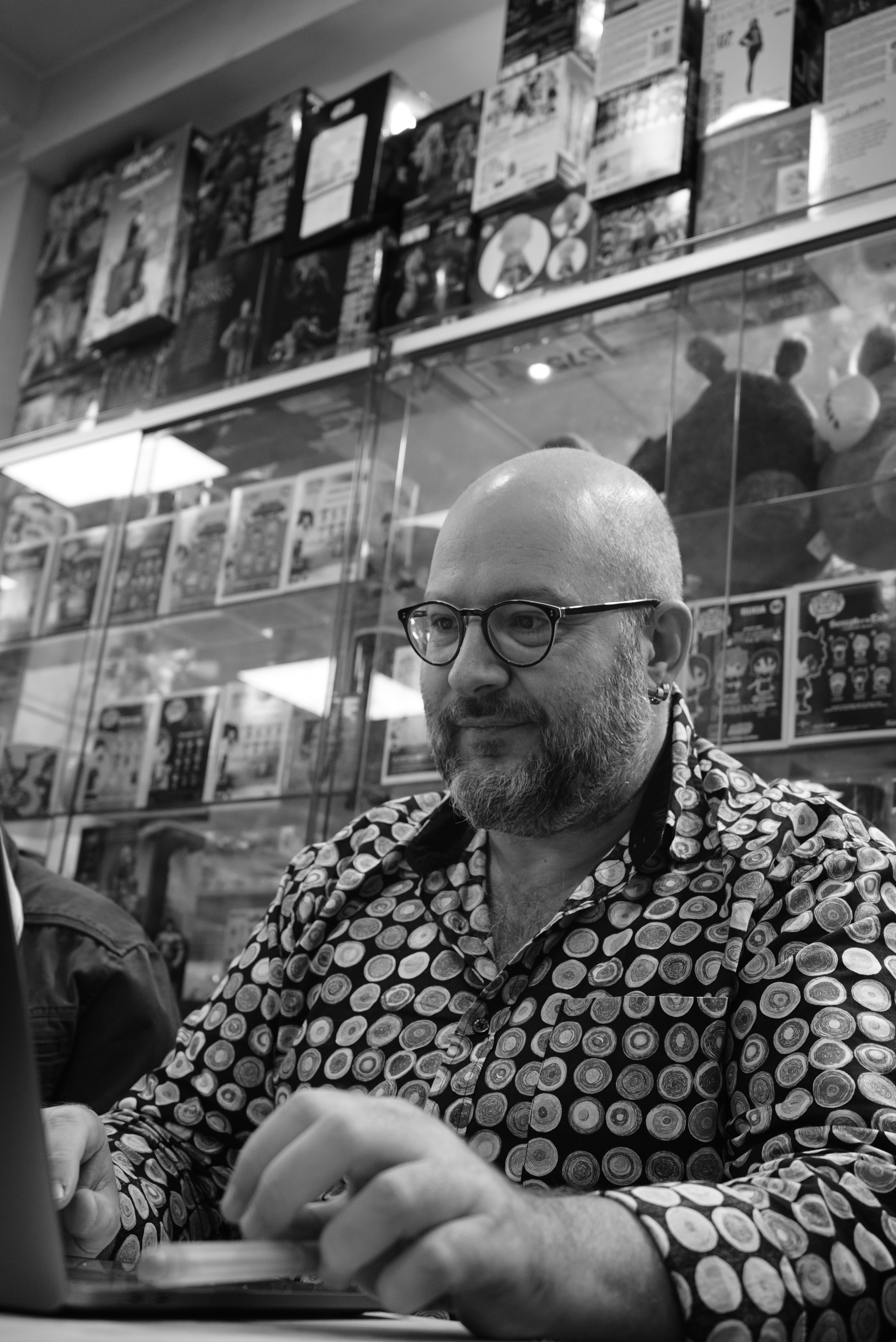
- Born: 28 November 1969 (age 56); Reims, Marne, France

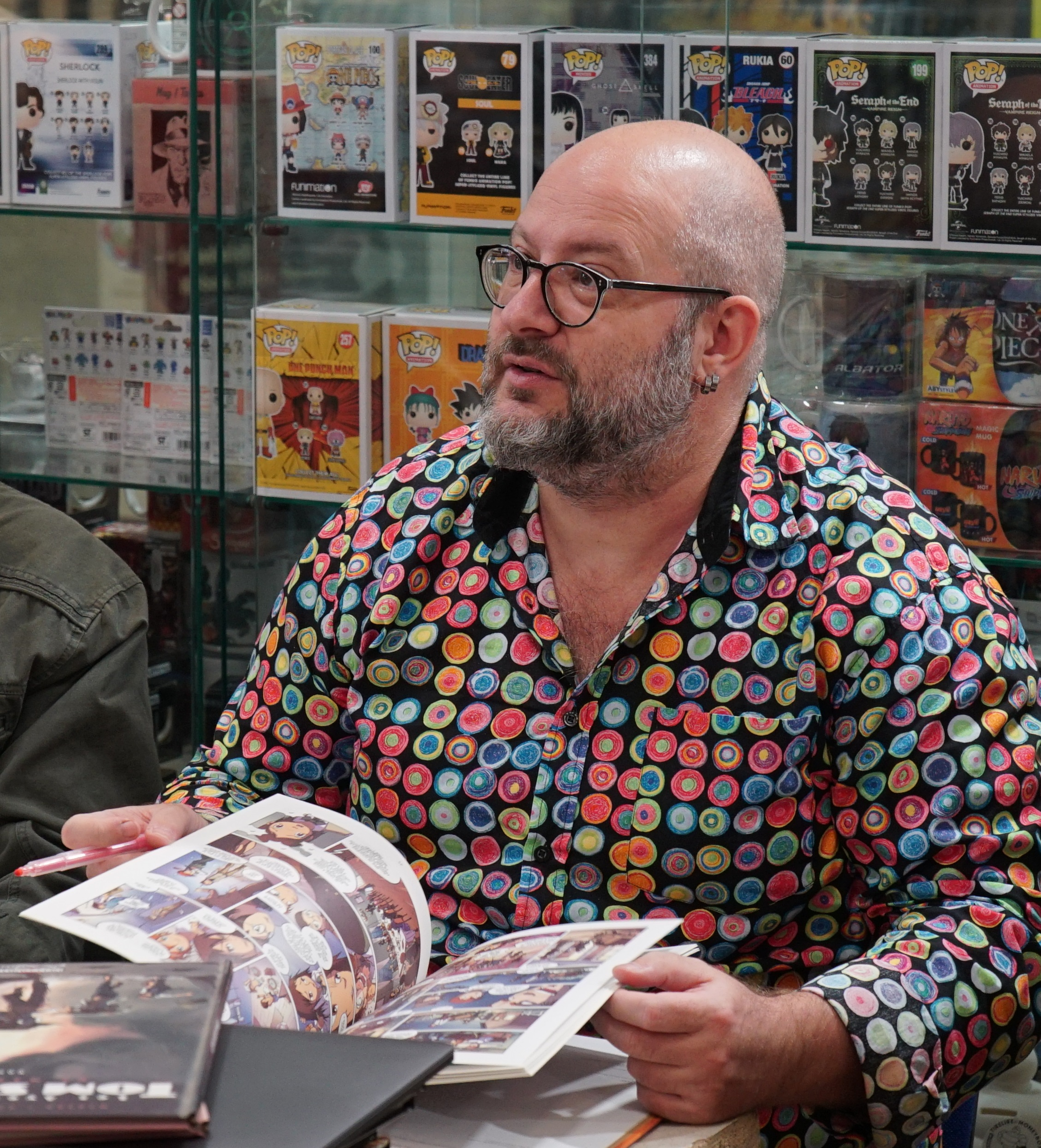
Morvan in 2017

Jean-David Morvan (born 28 November 1969) is a French comics writer.

Morvan studied arts at the Institut Saint-Luc in Brussels. Morvan started out as a comics artist, but soon realised that his true strength is storytelling, and so now he is best known as a comics writer. He resides in Reims, France.

His main series are Spirou et Fantasio, Sir Pyle and Merlin, all with José Luis Munuera, and Wake with Philippe Buchet. He wrote Ashes, Ashes, a 2016–2021 adaptation of René Barjavel's novel of the same name. He has published more than 230 comics to date.

== Awards ==
- 2002: nominated for the Youth Award (9-12 years) at the Angoulême International Comics Festival, France
- 2004: nominated for the Youth Award (9–12 years) at the Angoulême International Comics Festival
- 2006: Youth Award (9–12 years) at the Angoulême International Comics Festival
  - Νominated for Best Youth Comic at the Prix Saint-Michel, Brussels, Belgium
- 2007: Best Youth Comic at the Prix Saint-Michel
- 2008: nominated for Best Story at the Prix Saint-Michel
