= Philippe Buchet =

French comic book artist

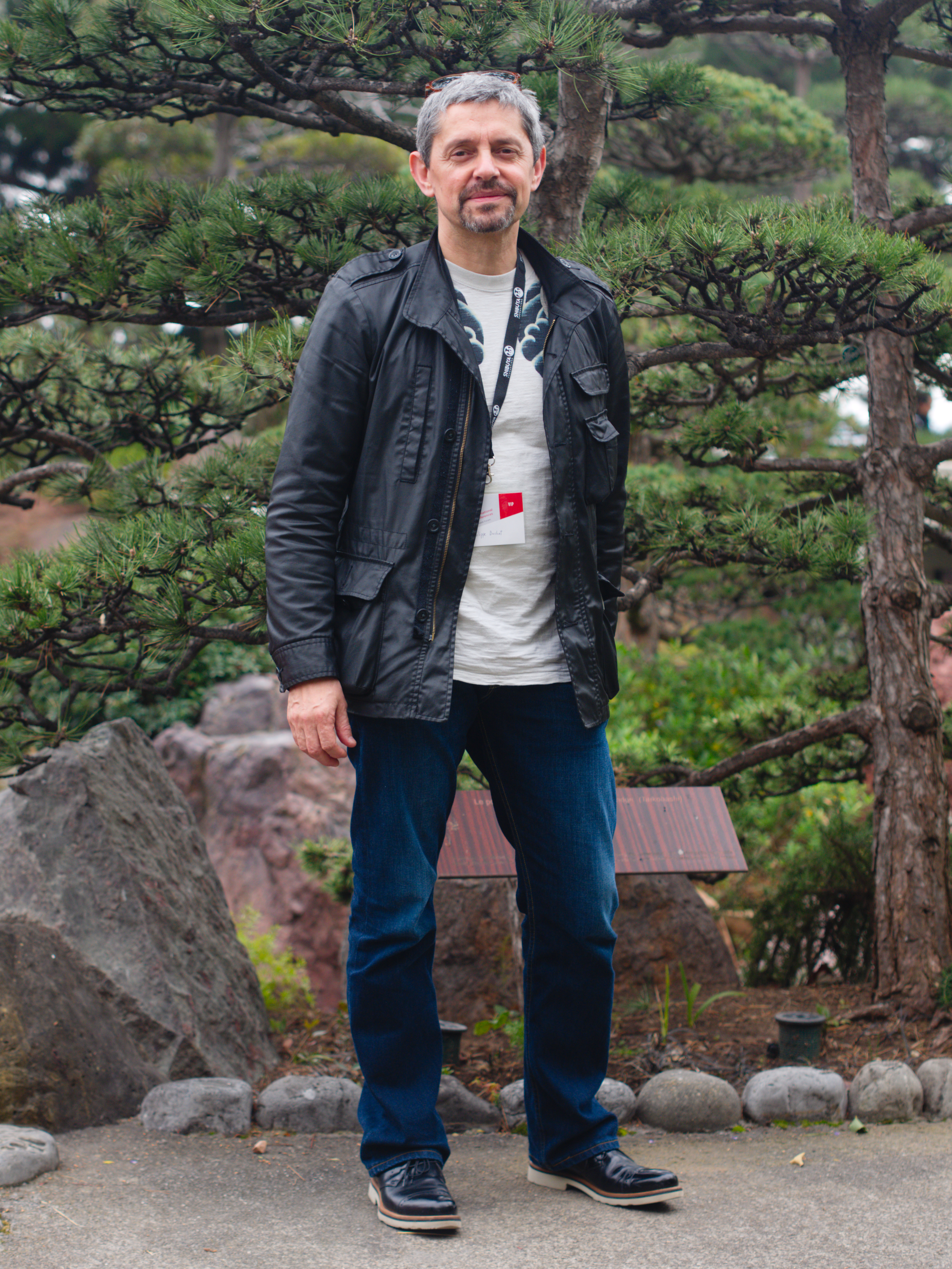
Buchet in 2015

Philippe Buchet (born 7 May 1962 in Juniville, Ardennes) is a French comic book artist.

First working as a freelance illustrator in Paris and Reims, he finally entered comic book terrain with Nomad, on which he worked with Jean-David Morvan. He also worked for the magazine Dragon, and created Wake together with Morvan. While working for Dragon he collaborated with Morvan on a sword and sorcery series La Quête des réponses, which came out as a single album in 1998.
