= Expatriation Act =

Expatriation Act may refer to:

- Expatriation Act of 1862, Kentucky law stripping Confederate soldiers of citizenship
- Expatriation Act of 1868, United States law reiterating right of renunciation of citizenship
- Expatriation Act of 1907, United States law providing for loss of citizenship by Americans residing abroad
- Enemy Expatriation Act of 2012, United States bill providing for denationalization for "enemy combatants"

== See also ==
- Ex-PATRIOT Act of 2012, United States bill which would bar former citizens from re-entry
