= Carl J. Mayer =

American lawyer (born 1959)

- Born: April 23, 1959 (age 67); Brookline, Massachusetts
- Education: Princeton University; University of Chicago Law School; Harvard Law School
- Occupations: Lawyer, politician, author, public speaker and consumer advocate
- Parents: Arno J. Mayer (father); Nancy Grant Mayer (mother)
- Website: Currently down

Carl J. Mayer (born April 23, 1959 in Brookline, Massachusetts) is an American lawyer, politician, author, public speaker and consumer advocate.

Long before the Supreme Court decided Citizens United in 2010, Mayer wrote a law review article calling for the elimination of corporate rights under the United States constitution which nowhere mentions corporations.

Additionally, in June 2017, before NJ Transit's "summer of hell" Mayer wrote an op-ed, "NJ Transit riders of the world, unite!" calling for a passenger sit-in as an act of protest over the terrible conditions New Jersey commuters are being submitted to.

== Early life and education ==
Carl J. Mayer is the son of Dayton-Stockton Professor Emeritus Arno J. Mayer, who taught European history at Princeton University and Nancy Grant Mayer, a magazine writer from New York whose profiles frequently appeared on the cover of New York magazine.

Mayer's paternal grandparents were Frank J. Mayer and Ida (Lieben) Mayer. Frank Mayer was the first Consul General representing the State of Israel in his native Luxembourg.

Mayer's maternal grandparents were Arnold Monroe Grant and Frances S. Grant. Arnold Grant was an entertainment lawyer whose clients included Johnny Carson, Orson Welles, Salvador Dalí, Bing Crosby and Gary Cooper.

Grant was also an adviser to many prominent politicians including Franklin and Eleanor Roosevelt, John and Bobby Kennedy and Adlai Stevenson. Active in Jewish affairs, he received the American Jewish Committee’s Human Relations Award.

Mayer graduated magna cum laude from Princeton University, majoring in the Woodrow Wilson School of Public and International Affairs.

He received his J.D. degree from the University of Chicago – where he was on the Law Review and was President of the student body. He also holds an LL.M degree from Harvard Law School.

Mayer clerked for United States Federal District Court Judge Caleb M. Wright.

Mayer has two children.

== 60 Minutes Profile of Carl Mayer ==
In 1996, while serving as the first Independent elected to the Township Committee in Princeton, New Jersey, Mayer went undercover for the CBS program 60 Minutes. Working with the news program, he uncovered corruption and bribery among state officials and corporate lobbyists.

The segment originated when Mayer wrote an article for The New York Times on the topic in 1995 describing the intersection of state politics and corporate lobbyists. In particular, he singled out two events: the annual New Jersey State League of Municipalities convention for elected officials in Atlantic City as well as an event sponsored by the New Jersey Chamber of Commerce in which the organization would charter an Amtrak train to transport over 1,000 politicians, businessmen and lobbyists from New Jersey to Washington for its annual Congressional reception.

Producers for 60 Minutes contacted Committeeman Mayer and asked him to work with them to unearth political corruption. Both Mike Wallace and Morley Safer appeared on the program. In the 60 Minutes segment, Mayer attends these events undercover so as to allow viewers to see "the political education of Carl Mayer in the purest possible way." On the Atlantic City junket, host Morley Safer concluded the receptions, campaign contributions and lobbyists combined with convention gimmicks gave corporations access to state officials they may not have otherwise, at the taxpayers' expense. Mayer says, "the primary purpose of this is for the lobbyists to get their hands on the elected leaders and, in particular, to get their hands on the billions of dollars that municipalities and the states spend every year on various projects."

The Amtrak train ride is described by Safer as a convergence of lobbyists and business people looking for contracts and favors and politicians who want campaign contributions. Mayer's fear is that this small time corruption at the local level is a slippery slope on the way to Washington, D.C. Despite denials by the Chamber of Commerce, the 60 Minutes exposé shows lobbyists on the train offering Mayer, then an elected official, cruises to the Caribbean and other emoluments.

Mayer later wrote about this phenomenon in a book entitled Shakedown: The Fleecing of the Garden State, about how corporate interests had taken over the Republican and Democratic Parties.

=== The Results of Mayer's 60 Minutes Expose: Politicians and Corporate Lobbyists Jailed ===
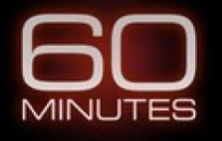
60 Min Logo

Gerald (Jerry) Free, an executive for United Gunite Construction Co., makes an appearance during the 60 Minutes segment about Carl Mayer, where Free is shown on camera handing a cameraman a $100 bill tucked inside one of his United Gunite business cards at the Atlantic City junket. When the cameraman attempts to give Free the money back, Free refuses, saying "I was going to buy you lunch." When confronted with this transgression by Safer, William Dressel Jr., executive director of the New Jersey League of Municipalities, condemned the United Gunite executive's action.

After Mayer's exposé on 60 Minutes, Free came under investigation, and in 1999 he admitted to handing out illegal gifts, trips and cash in exchange for millions of dollars' worth of New Jersey government contracts for United Gunite. The U.S. Attorney's Office in Newark stated that Free had admitted he routinely offered graft to officials in the "various municipalities" in which his firm sought and obtained contracts. As part of his plea deal, Free worked with the FBI to secretly record his dealings for investigators - resulting in the arrest of several New Jersey officials.

Among these was Martin Barnes, then the mayor of Paterson, New Jersey, who received a forty-count indictment handed down by the United States Attorney for New Jersey, Chris Christie, on January 25, 2002. While the charges laid against Barnes included soliciting and accepting free trips, home improvements like a backyard swimming pool and waterfall, designer suits and money to pay for "female companionship," the investigation of Barnes and his administration grew out of the federal inquiry into United Gunite.

In the end, dozens of elected officials and lobbyists were jailed by federal prosecutors in the United Gunite scandal which was first unearthed by Mayer.

== Movement to abolish corporate Constitutional Rights ==
Mayer wrote the first law review article calling for an amendment to the United States Constitution that would strip corporations of any rights under the Constitution. The widely cited article began a movement to abolish “corporate personhood” which, Mayer pointed out, was a line of judicial decisions that accorded corporations all of the Bill of Rights protections humans enjoy, even though corporations are nowhere mentioned in the Constitution. Mayer called this "an extraordinary act of judicial activism" and coined the phrase “corporate substantive due process” which essentially means that corporations can use their Constitutional powers – granted by the courts – to overturn regulations of corporations. The most noxious of these rights, according to Mayer, are those accorded to corporations by judges under the First Amendment. Mayer's article, “Personalizing the Impersonal” (Hastings Law Journal, March 1990), has been credited with being an early responder to this issue.

The Supreme Court, in the Citizens United case, held that corporations may spend unlimited amounts of money on political elections.

== Mayer Law Group ==
Mayer is the founding member of Mayer Law Group, LLC. Perhaps best known for representing the plaintiffs in Hedges v. Obama, the firm has offices in Manhattan, NY; Princeton, NJ; and Quinby, VA. Mayer Law Group specializes in public interest and plaintiff litigation.

The firm has sued utility United Water, in both New Jersey - filed in 2004 - and New York - filed in 2016. In New Jersey, a multimillion-dollar settlement has been reached, alleging that United Water New Jersey Inc. or HomeServe USA Corp., offered for sale various types of Service Plans to owners of multi-unit dwellings in New Jersey where the Service Plans specifically exclude multi-unit dwellings, and the owners did not receive service or refund.

In February 2016, Mayer Law Group filed consumer class actions against Dunkin' Donuts Brands, Inc. in New York and New Jersey. The suits allege that the doughnut retailer has been unlawfully assessing a surcharge, noted on receipts as a "sales tax," on products the company cannot lawfully charge tax on.

=== High Impact Public Interest Litigation ===
==== Fighting Indefinite Detention in Hedges v. Obama ====
Carl Mayer served as co-lead counsel to the plaintiffs in Hedges v. Obama, a lawsuit filed January 13, 2012 against the Obama administration and members of the U.S. Congress by a group including former New York Times reporter and columnist Christopher Hedges, challenging the National Defense Authorization Act for Fiscal Year 2012 (NDAA). The legislation permits the U.S. government to indefinitely detain people "who substantially support Al Qaeda, the Taliban or associated forces engaged in hostilities against the United States".

The lawsuit argued that this language is so broad that journalists, activists and ordinary Americans could be swept up in its net and detained indefinitely without even a lawyer or a trial by jury. Mayer argued that this law is unconstitutional and violative of the First Amendment to the Constitution. Judge Catherine Forrest of the Southern District of New York agreed with the plaintiffs and wrote lengthy opinions granting both a temporary and permanent injunction striking down this law. The Second Circuit Court of Appeals overturned the decision and lifted the stay and the Supreme Court refused to hear the case.

In addition to Pulitzer Prize winning reporter Chris Hedges, Mayer represented several other clients in this civil rights litigation including Pentagon Papers whistleblower Daniel Ellsberg, Noam Chomsky and Birgitta Jonsdottir (a member of Iceland's Parliament). The litigation was also supported by the National Lawyers Guild, Cornel West and Naomi Wolfe.

==== Litigating to Stop Federal Government Surveillance of All Americans ====
In May 2006, Mayer and attorney Bruce Afran filed a lawsuit in federal court in New Jersey, against Verizon, challenging the National Security Agency's (NSA) wiretapping operations and alleging that the company turned over call records to the NSA. Filed on behalf of unnamed AT&T employees, the suit claims that in February 2001 the NSA met with AT&T officials to discuss replicating a network center in Bedminster, NJ, with the goal of allowing the agency access to all the international phone and e-mail traffic running through the center. One of the plaintiffs, an engineer, told The New York Times "that he participated in numerous discussions with N.S.A. officials about the proposal. The officials, he said, discussed ways to duplicate the Bedminster system in Maryland so the agency 'could listen in' with unfettered access to communications that it believed had intelligence value and store them for later review. There was no discussion of limiting the monitoring to international communications, he said.

The lawsuit also accused Verizon of installing a dedicated fiber optic line from New Jersey to Quantico, VA for similar purposes.

==== Spygate ====
After the 2007 New England Patriots video scandal, widely dubbed "Spygate," broke, Carl Mayer filed a federal lawsuit. A New York Jets season-ticket holder, Mayer filed the lawsuit against the New England Patriots, coach Bill Belichick and the NFL "on behalf of himself and all others similarly situated" alleging fraud, among other claims.

The lawsuit asserted that because teams discovered the illicit videotaping, Jets ticket holders should be compensated for all games played in Giants Stadium between the Jets and Patriots since Belichick became head coach in 2000.

While the case was dismissed by the U.S. District Court and the U.S. Court of Appeals for the Third Circuit, Judge Robert Cowen in his affirmation of the dismissal wrote:

Again, it bears repeating that our reasoning here is limited to the unusual and even unique circumstances presented by this appeal. We do not condone the conduct on the part of the Patriots and the team’s head coach, and we likewise refrain from assessing whether the NFL’s sanctions (and its alleged destruction of the videotapes themselves) were otherwise appropriate.

==== McGreevey Resignation/New Jersey Lieutenant Governor ====
Long known for filing ethics complaints against New Jersey politicians, Carl Mayer teamed up with attorney Bruce Afran to file a litigation on behalf of New Jersey voters claiming that the voters should have a right to choose the successor to Governor Jim McGreevey once he resigned and the outgoing governor should not be able, under the New Jersey constitution, to simply appoint a successor. Rather, the lawsuit argued that voters should immediately vote to choose any successor. Although the lawsuit did not prevail, the legislature created the position of lieutenant governor to ensure that an elected official would be running the government in case of a sudden succession – largely as a result of the lawsuit and public pressure.

==== Other Clients ====
The Mayer Law Group LLC has worked with or had as clients the Sierra Club, The Animal League Defense Fund, the Humane Society, the National Organization for Women, Friends of the Earth, Demand Progress, Revolution Truth, Progressive Democrats of America and the Tenth Amendment Center.

== Writings ==
Mayer is the author of two books: Public Domain, Private Dominion (Sierra Club Press)(with George Riley) and Shakedown: The Fleecing of the Garden State.

The Supreme Court in an opinion in Amoco Production Co. v. Southern Ute Tribe 526 U.S. 865 (1999) cited Mayer's book Public Domain as a comprehensive history of public lands in America, which comprise almost one-third of the lands of the United States. Besides law review articles, Mayer has published numerous opinion pieces - most recently an op-ed in the New York Daily News calling for a passenger sit-in for riders of NJ Transit - and appeared on all the major networks to advance his views on public interest law and political reform.

== Public speaking ==
Mayer lectures widely and has given talks around the country, including at Columbia Law school, NYU law school, the University of San Diego Law School and the University of Seattle Law School, among others. He gives public addresses and spoke at the Occupy Wall Street encampment at Zuccotti Park. He has addressed gatherings as large as 20,000 at a political rally as well as seminars for lawyers at the annual AFL-CIO convention.
