= Alexa O'Brien =

American journalist, researcher, analyst, and activist

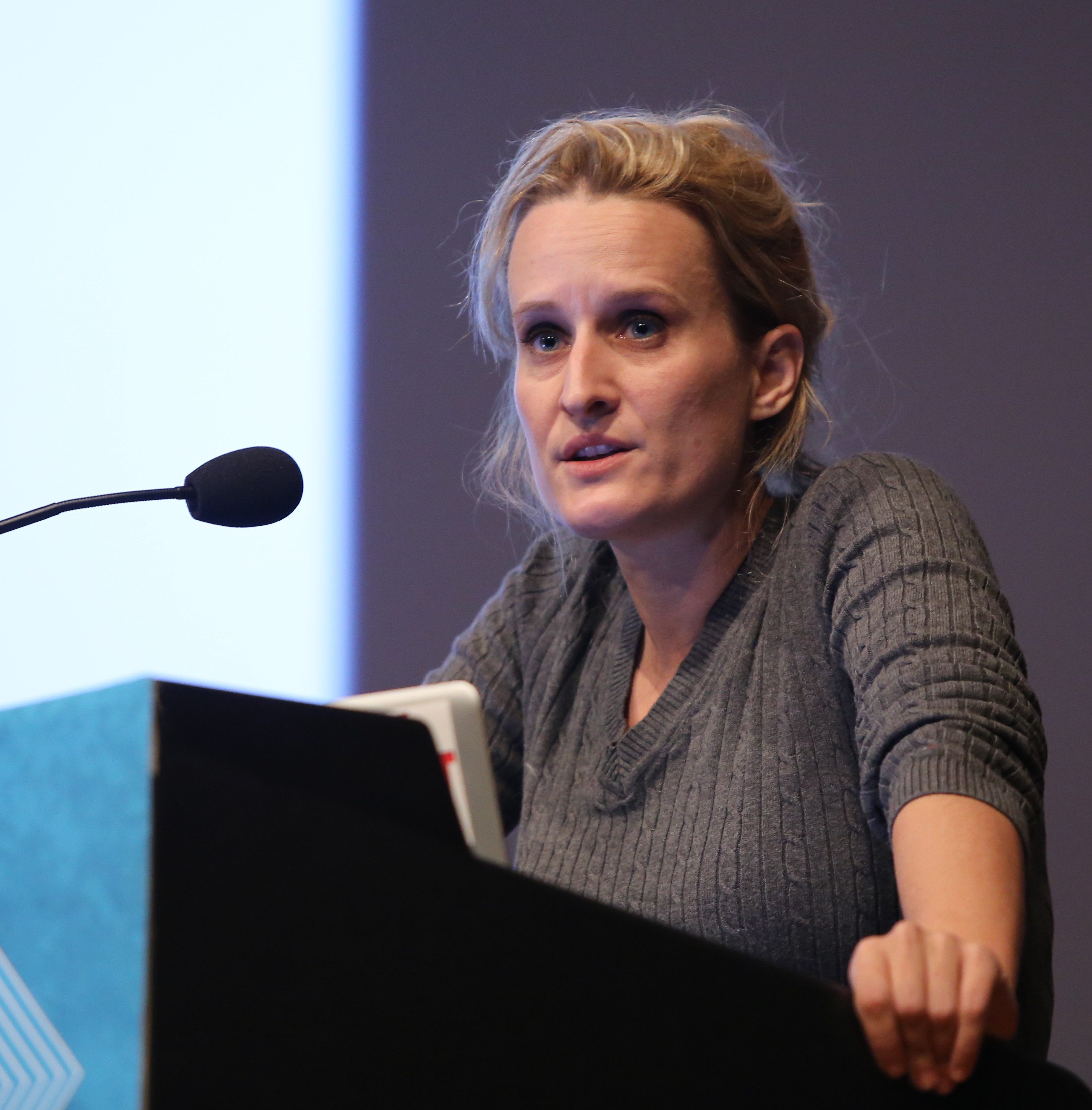
- O'Brien at the 30th Chaos Communication Congress, 2013
- Born: Seattle, Washington, U.S.
- Education: Kenyon College (BA); Georgetown University (MPS)
- Occupations: Investigative researcher, journalist, and analyst
- Website: alexaobrien.com

Alexa O'Brien is an American investigative researcher, journalist, analyst, and activist who focuses on intelligence and national security. She extensively documented Chelsea Manning's court-martial, and has researched and reported on topics including WikiLeaks' leak of United States diplomatic cables and Guantanamo Bay files, the war on terror, and the Arab Spring.

== Education ==
O'Brien earned her bachelor's degree in political science from Kenyon College. After beginning her career as a researcher and analyst, she attended Georgetown University, earning a master's degree in applied intelligence in 2020. She wrote her capstone on the ethics of media usage of intelligence.

== Career ==
O'Brien began her career in information technology, later becoming a researcher and independent journalist.

From mid-December 2011 until summer 2013, O'Brien created an extensive archive of the only available pretrial transcripts of the court-martial of accused WikiLeaks source Chelsea Manning. In May 2013, O'Brien was co-recipient with blogger Kevin Gosztola of an $8,500 grant from the Freedom of the Press Foundation to cover the trial. In 2013, HuffPost described O'Brien as Manning's "one-woman court records system". O'Brien briefly worked for WikiLeaks in 2014, later saying she found working for the organization was not a good fit due to her opposition to the ideology of WikiLeaks and its followers.

In 2015, O'Brien's Freedom of Information Act (FOIA) lawsuit against the State Department seeking documents related to internal government discussions about WikiLeaks forced the first official release of an email from Hillary Clinton's private email account used to conduct official business while Secretary of State. Also in 2015, O'Brien collaborated with William Arkin to publish a two-part Vice News series about American universities with close ties to the military.

In July 2019, O'Brien published a report for Airwars, a London non-profit that documents the international war against the Islamic State and other groups, and reports on injuries and deaths of non-combatants. In her report, titled "News In Brief: US Media Coverage of Civilian Harm in the War Against So-Called Islamic State", she reported that there was poor news coverage of civilian casualties in the war against ISIS.

O'Brien focuses on intelligence and national security. In addition to her coverage of United States v. Manning, she has covered topics including WikiLeaks' leak of United States diplomatic cables and Guantanamo Bay files. She has also published on the topics of the war on terror and the Arab Spring.

== Activism ==
In March 2011, Alexa O'Brien started "US Day of Rage" (USDOR), a campaign to demand free and fair elections. Later that year, USDOR organized all the nonviolent civil disobedience actions at Occupy Wall Street (OWS). In his book Thank You, Anarchy: Notes from the Occupy Apocalypse, author Nathan Schneider relates that during the early stages of OWS, O'Brien's "press releases and tweets became so ubiquitous that people started referring to #OCCUPYWALLSTREET and US Day of Rage interchangeably."

In 2012, O'Brien was a plaintiff in Hedges v. Obama, a lawsuit challenging the National Defense Authorization Act for Fiscal Year 2012, which allowed the U.S. government to indefinitely detain people who are a part of or "substantially support" Al Qaeda, the Taliban, or similar groups. A New York federal court granted a permanent injunction blocking the authorization of indefinite detention in September 2012, but this was overturned in July 2013 by the Second Circuit Court of Appeals. The Supreme Court declined to hear the case in 2014, leaving the decision by the Second Circuit in place.

== Publications ==
- O'Brien, Alexa (July 2019). "News In Brief: US Media Coverage of Civilian Harm in the War Against So-Called Islamic State" (PDF). Airwars.
- Lundy, Larry; O'Brien, Alexa; Solis, Christine; Sowers, Aaron; Turner, Jeffrey (July 5, 2019). "The Ethics of Applied Intelligence in Modern Conflict". International Journal of Intelligence and CounterIntelligence. 32 (3): 587–599. doi:10.1080/08850607.2019.1607693. S2CID 198629471.
- O'Brien, Alexa; Rodriguez, Luis E. (February 20, 2020). "By the Numbers: Former U.S. Intelligence Officials Discuss Personal Opinion versus Professional Obligation". International Journal of Intelligence and CounterIntelligence. 33 (2): 354–379. doi:10.1080/08850607.2020.1716297. S2CID 214311410.
- O'Brien, Alexa (October 16, 2020). "Politicization of Australian Intelligence Is Alive and Well". International Journal of Intelligence and CounterIntelligence. 34 (3): 624–626. doi:10.1080/08850607.2020.1816200. S2CID 228997736.
