= Spygate (NFL) =

2007 NFL controversy

Spygate scandal
- Date: September 9, 2007
- Duration: 2007–2008
- Venue: NFL
- Participants: New England Patriots coaching staff, Bill Belichick, Roger Goodell, Josh McDaniels
- Outcome: Multiple fines, docked draft selections, rule changes, lawsuits against Bill Belichick and the New England Patriots, ordered destruction of video tape evidence by NFL commissioner Roger Goodell

The Spygate scandal was a National Football League (NFL) controversy during the 2007 season, in which it was discovered that the New England Patriots were videotaping opposing coaches' signals during games under head coach Bill Belichick. It began when the New England Patriots were disciplined by the NFL for videotaping the New York Jets' defensive coaches' signals from an unauthorized location during a September 9, 2007 game. Videotaping opposing coaches is not illegal in the NFL, per se; there are designated areas allowed by the league to do such taping. Because the Patriots were instead videotaping the Jets' coaches from their own sideline during the game, NFL Commissioner Roger Goodell deemed it to violate league rules, stating that the act represented a calculated and deliberate attempt to avoid long-standing rules designed to encourage fair play and promote honest competition on the playing field. After an investigation, the NFL fined Patriots head coach Bill Belichick $500,000 (the maximum allowed by the league and the largest fine ever imposed on a coach in the league's history) for his role in the incident, fined the Patriots $250,000, and docked the team their original first-round selection in the 2008 NFL draft which would have been the 31st pick of the draft.

As part of their probe into the allegations, the NFL required the Patriots to turn over any and all notes and tapes relating to the taping of opponents' defensive signals. The Patriots refused to allow the video tapes to leave their athletic facilities; in turn, at Goodell's order, league officials went to the Patriots' facilities and smashed the tapes.

Because the tapes were immediately smashed and never thoroughly examined by league officials, the size and scope of Spygate remain largely unknown. This led to criticisms against Goodell for destroying mounting evidence that could have exposed the Patriots organization. The destruction of videotapes was criticized on February 1, 2008 – 2 days before Super Bowl XLII – by U.S. Senator from Pennsylvania Arlen Specter, who requested to meet with Goodell. After meeting with Goodell on February 13, 2008, Specter reported that Goodell told him that Belichick had been engaged in the practice since he became head coach of the Patriots in 2000. Belichick said he believed he was operating within the rules as long as the tape was not used during the same game.

Whistleblowers within the Patriots organization alleged that illegal videotaping began as early as the 2000 season. A major controversy erupted when the Boston Herald reported that the team had also filmed the St. Louis Rams' private "walkthrough" practice before Super Bowl XXXVI in 2002. While Bill Belichick denied this, the NFL sought evidence from Matt Walsh, a former Patriots video assistant who had been fired following the 2002 season.

After reaching an indemnity agreement with the NFL in April 2008, Walsh provided evidence that clarified the scope of the team's activities. Walsh turned over eight videotapes containing footage of opposing coaches' hand signals recorded between the 2000 and 2002 seasons. This confirmed that the practice of filming signals from prohibited locations had been a long-standing operation. The Herald alleged that there was a ninth tape showcasing the Rams' private practice. Walsh met with Commissioner Roger Goodell on May 13, 2008, and explained that, while he and other employees were present during the Rams' walkthrough to set up equipment, no recording of the practice was actually ever made.

Because Walsh could not substantiate the existence of a walkthrough tape, Goodell announced that no further penalties would be leveled against the Patriots. Following these revelations, the Herald issued a formal apology and retracted its original story regarding the alleged walkthrough footage.

== Initial accusation and discipline ==
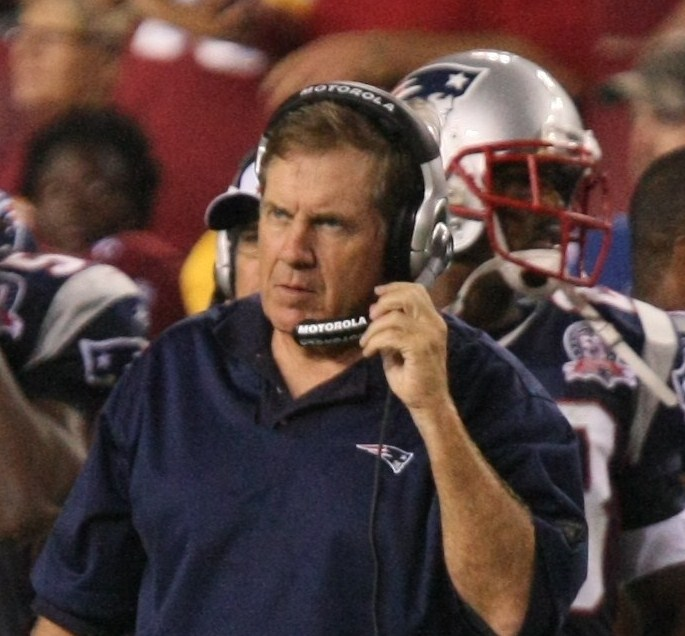
New England Patriots coach Bill Belichick in 2009

On September 10, 2007, New England Patriots head coach Bill Belichick was accused by the New York Jets of authorizing his staff to film the Jets' defensive signals from an on-field location, a violation of the National Football League's (NFL) rules. NFL Security confiscated the video camera used by video assistant Matt Estrella to film the signals during the game. Jets head coach Eric Mangini—a former Patriots assistant coach—had reported the fact that the Patriots were taping from the sidelines to NFL Security. Mangini later stated, "I didn't think it was any kind of significant advantage, but I wasn't going to give them the convenience of doing it in our stadium, and I wanted to shut it down. But there was no intent to get the league involved. There was no intent to have the landslide that it has become."

Two days later, Belichick issued a statement "to apologize to everyone who has been affected," and also stated that he spoke with NFL Commissioner Roger Goodell about Belichick's "interpretation of the rule." Belichick stated that he believed that if footage so collected was not used during the game, its collection was legal, as the NFL Constitution and Bylaws stipulate that "...any communications or information-gathering equipment, other than Polaroid-type cameras or field telephones, shall be prohibited...including without limitation...any other form of electronic devices that might aid a team during the playing of a game." In a September 2006 memorandum sent out by NFL Vice President of Football Operations Ray Anderson, though, all teams were told that "videotaping of any type, including but not limited to taping of an opponent's offensive or defensive signals, is prohibited on the sidelines, in the coaches' booth, in the locker room, or at any other locations accessible to club staff members during the game."

=== Penalty and fines ===
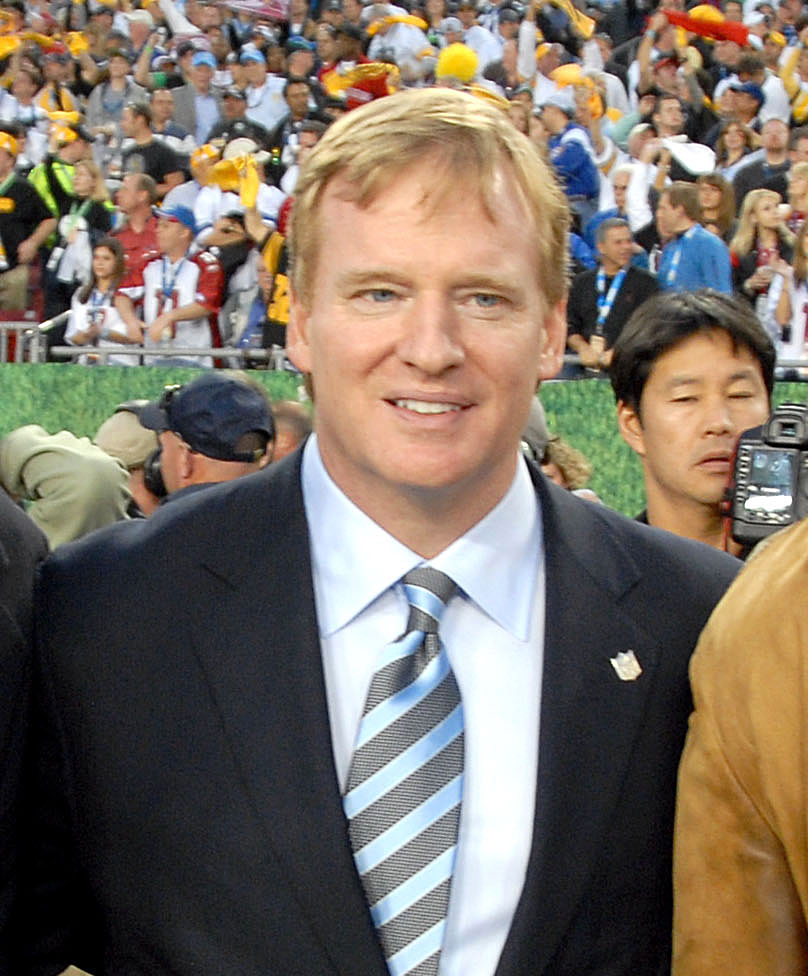
NFL Commissioner Roger Goodell at Super Bowl XLIII

On September 13, for the "use of equipment to videotape an opposing team’s offensive or defensive signals," Belichick was officially fined $500,000—the largest fine ever imposed on a coach in the league's then-87-year history, and the maximum permitted under league rules. The Patriots were also fined $250,000, and stripped of their first-round selection in the 2008 NFL Draft; if the Patriots had missed the playoffs, they would have forfeited their second- and third-round selections instead. Goodell said that he fined the Patriots as a team because Belichick is effectively the team's general manager as well as head coach, and exercises so much control over the Patriots' on-field operations that "his actions and decisions are properly attributed to the club." Goodell considered suspending Belichick, but decided that taking away draft picks would be more severe in the long run. The Patriots officially clinched their fifth straight AFC East division title on November 25, making them the first NFL team since the 1971 Miami Dolphins to have a first-round pick taken away by league action.

The next day, Belichick issued a statement in which he apologized for what he called a "mistake" in his interpretation of the rules. However, he denied ever using videotape to gain an advantage while a game was underway, which Goodell also acknowledged.

On September 16, Goodell ordered the Patriots to hand over all notes, tapes, and other materials related to the incident, threatening further discipline if the Patriots did not comply. On September 20, the NFL announced it had received and destroyed the requested materials. In his pre-Super Bowl XLII press conference, Goodell revealed the contents of the materials, saying there were six tapes from late in the 2006 season and the 2007 preseason.

=== Initial response ===
After footage from the actual tape was aired on Fox NFL Sunday on September 16, former Dallas Cowboys head coach Jimmy Johnson claimed, "This is exactly how I was told to do it 18 years ago by a Kansas City Chiefs scout. I tried it, but I didn't think it helped us." Johnson also said, "Bill Belichick was wrong because he videotaped signals after a memo was sent out to all of the teams saying not to do it. But what irritates me is hearing some reactions from players and coaches. These players don't know what their coaches are doing. And some of the coaches have selective amnesia because I know for a fact various teams were doing this. That's why the memo was sent to everybody. That doesn't make [Belichick] right, but a lot of teams are doing this."

Former Miami Dolphins head coach Don Shula commented on the incident on November 6, when the Patriots themselves were seven wins away from a perfect regular season, saying: "The Spygate thing has diminished what they've accomplished. You would hate to have that attached to your accomplishments. They've got it. ...I guess you got the same thing as putting an asterisk by Barry Bonds' home run record. I guess it will be noted that the Patriots were fined and a number-one draft choice was taken away during that year of accomplishment." Patriots defensive end Richard Seymour responded, saying "I really don’t pay too much attention to it...Nothing that I’ve done or I’ve seen this team do should have an asterisk by it." Safety Rodney Harrison also dismissed the comments: "It really doesn’t matter. We have a lot of respect for [Shula] and he’s entitled to whatever he thinks. It just doesn’t matter." After New England completed the regular season unbeaten, Shula commended the Patriots for doing "a great job of concentrating on each week's opponent and not letting any other distractions interrupt that focus."

In addition, beginning with the 2008 season, the NFL owners approved a rule that permitted defensive coach-to-player radio communications, mirroring the system used by the offense first implemented in 1994.

== Congressional attention ==
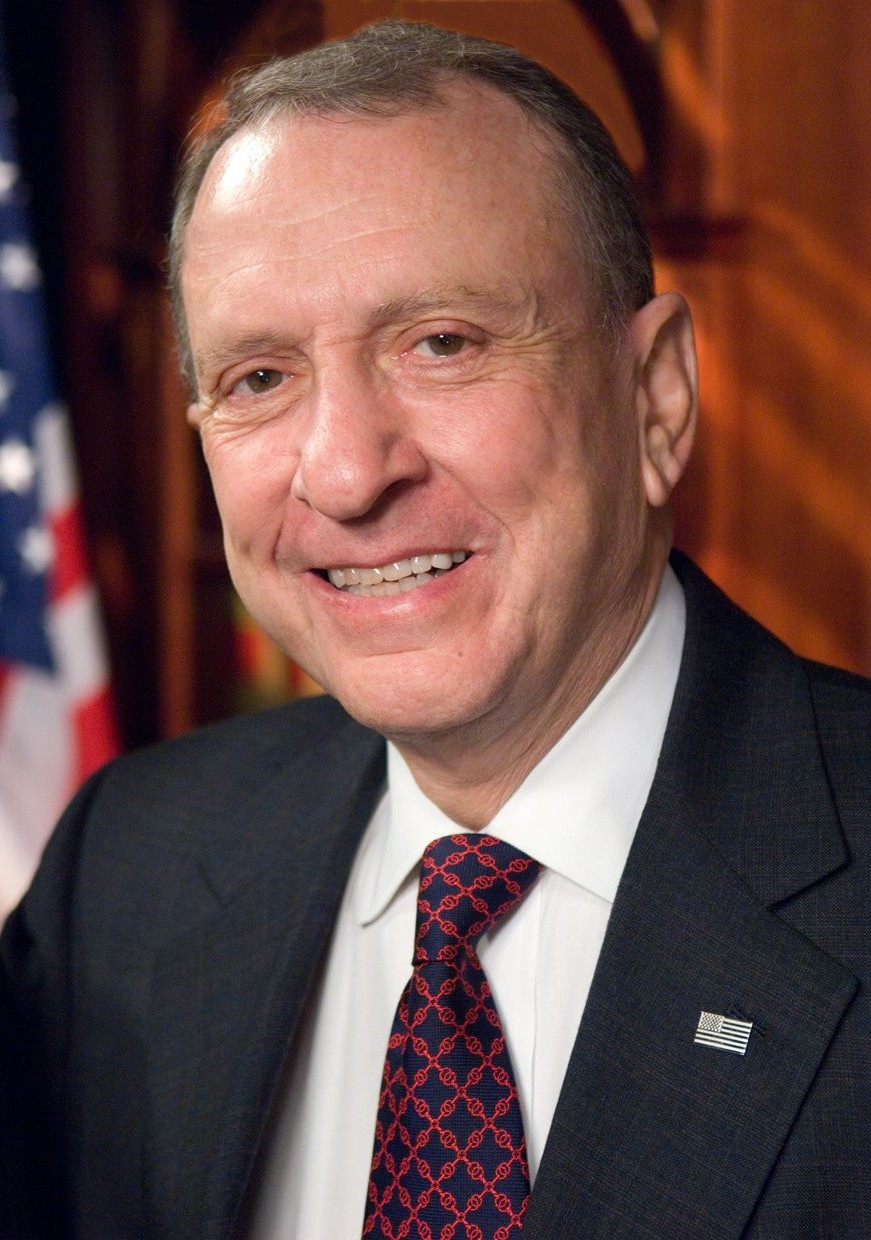
U.S. Senator Arlen Specter questioned Goodell's decision to destroy the tapes.

On February 1, 2008, U.S. Senator Arlen Specter (then R-PA), the ranking member of the Senate Judiciary Committee, commented on the incident and the NFL's decision to destroy the video tape evidence in a New York Times article. Specter was quoted in a letter to NFL commissioner Roger Goodell as saying, "I am very concerned about the underlying facts on the taping, the reasons for the judgment on the limited penalties and, most of all, on the inexplicable destruction of the tapes." Specter also said he could call Goodell to attend a congressional hearing on the league's antitrust exemption, at which time Goodell would also be asked to comment on the destruction of the tapes received from the Patriots. Specter's true motivation for becoming involved with Spygate was brought into question by some due to the fact that Specter's largest campaign contributors were Comcast and its lobbyists, and at the time Comcast was in the middle of an acrimonious dispute with NFL Network over distribution fees.

In his annual Super Bowl press conference later on February 1, Goodell said he was "more than willing" to meet with Congress to explain his reasoning behind destroying the tapes, and added he didn't think the videotaping incident "tainted [the Patriots'] accomplishments." Goodell reiterated these beliefs in a January 31 memorandum to Specter while also adding that the NFL had no evidence the Patriots improperly taped the Eagles' signals during Super Bowl XXXIX.

Goodell and Specter privately met in Washington, D.C., on February 13, 2008. After the meeting, Goodell said he believed destroying the materials was "the right thing to do" and that he "had nothing to hide." Later, Specter told reporters that he "found a lot of questions unanswerable because the tapes and notes had been destroyed." Goodell also told Specter that Belichick privately informed Goodell during the initial investigation that the taping practices dated back to when Belichick took over as the Patriots' head coach in 2000. Goodell told reporters Belichick believed the taping was legal, adding "He said that's always been his interpretation since he's been the head coach...We are going to agree to disagree on the facts." Specter also told reporters the "Spygate" case against the New England Patriots involved four games against the Steelers, including two AFC championship games. Specter told the Pittsburgh Post-Gazette "I think Steelers fans have a lot to be concerned about this and I'm one of them...maybe Steelers ownership should think about it a little." Two days later, Steelers chairman Dan Rooney rebuffed Specter, stating that "We consider the tapes of our coaching staff during our games against the New England Patriots to be a non-issue. In our opinion, they had no impact on the results of those games."

== Further accusations against the Patriots ==
=== Information from Matt Walsh ===
Matt Walsh, a former Patriots employee who was with the team in 2001 as a video assistant and was fired after the 2002 season, which he spent as a scouting assistant, indicated in the days before Super Bowl XLII that he had information regarding the Patriots' actions but had not yet divulged it: "If I had a reason to want to go public or tell a story, I could have done it before this even broke," he said. "I could have said everything rather than having [New York Jets head coach Eric] Mangini be the one to bring it out." Walsh claimed he was bound by a confidentiality agreement he signed with the Patriots; while Walsh had not been contacted by the Patriots or the NFL until after both The New York Times and ESPN published quotes from him on February 1, 2008, he said that he was contacted by media outlets following the September 2007 incident, but had sought legal advice to "protect him and his family." The Patriots later denied that such a confidentiality arrangement existed.

=== Boston Herald report ===
On February 2, 2008, the day before the Patriots' appearance in Super Bowl XLII, the Boston Herald reported, citing an unnamed source, that a member of the Patriots video staff videotaped the St. Louis Rams' Saturday, February 2, 2002 walkthrough prior to Super Bowl XXXVI at the Louisiana Superdome, an accusation denied by the Patriots later that day. The NFL conducted interviews with Belichick and other members of the Patriots before and after Super Bowl XLII regarding the accusation, and found no evidence to substantiate the Super Bowl XXXVI allegations or any other transgressions besides those the NFL had already penalized the Patriots for.

Citing a league source, The Boston Globe reported on March 10, 2008, that NFL investigators found practical limitations to the allegation; the Patriots' video equipment that was set up the day before the game had neither battery packs nor a nearby power supply in order to run. Also, an NFL investigator interviewed a Patriots employee who left the Louisiana Superdome that day with Walsh; according to the employee, Walsh said of the walkthrough: "We should have taped that."

Boston Herald writer John Tomase, who authored the story, told WROR-FM on February 5, 2008, that the "rumor had been around for a while. ...It was something we first heard about in September, after Spygate. We dug around and couldn't quite nail it down." Tomase said that the story "wasn't even on his radar screen" until February 1, 2008, when The New York Times published their article on Specter's desire to meet with Goodell. At that time, Tomase said, the Boston Herald decided to publish their story, which they had been able to "confirm in a way they felt comfortable with," after the newspaper felt both The New York Times and ESPN were also close to publishing the allegation. The Boston Herald later apologized for the report and retracted it.

=== Lawsuits ===
On February 15, 2008, former Rams safety Willie Gary filed a $100 million lawsuit in a New Orleans, Louisiana United States district court against the Patriots, Belichick, and Patriots owner Robert Kraft seeking compensation for the Rams' Super Bowl XXXVI loss in light of the allegations. The class action lawsuit was later withdrawn on March 10, 2008.

Carl J. Mayer, a Princeton, New Jersey, lawyer with Jets season tickets, filed a $184.8 million lawsuit against Belichick. The damages represented the cost of tickets for Jets-Patriots games at Giants Stadium during Belichick's tenure as coach. Mayer requested that sum, $61.6 million, be tripled under federal racketeering laws. The U.S. Third Circuit Court of Appeals upheld a lower court dismissal of the lawsuit.

=== Patriots' response ===
In a February 17, 2008 interview with The Boston Globe, Belichick denied ever taping another team's walkthrough practice, saying that "I have never authorized, or heard of, or even seen in any way, shape, or form any other team's walkthrough. We don't even film our own. ...[in my] entire coaching career, I have never filmed a walkthrough, our own. I've never been on a staff that has filmed a walkthrough. I'm talking about when I was a head coach. As an assistant, I've never seen a head coach film a walkthrough the day before a game." Belichick also noted he "couldn't pick Matt Walsh out of a lineup" and disagreed with the use of the name "Spygate," as all the taping the Patriots did was in plain view.

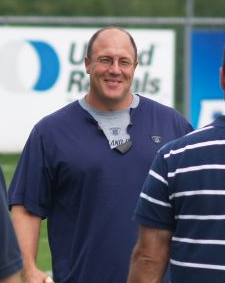
Scott Pioli, the Patriots vice president of player personnel

According to Patriots vice president of player personnel Scott Pioli, who was also interviewed, Walsh was fired by the Patriots in January 2003 after he was found by Pioli to be secretly audio-recording conversations between the two. Pioli also denied reports that Walsh was ever an "area scout" for the team, adding Walsh had an "entry-level position that we have all the scouting assistants in...making copies, picking people up at the airport, data entry, more of the highlight tapes of the players, the NFL draft-eligible guys." Pioli also believed "that the work [Walsh] was doing wasn't up to the same level as the other people" and that there was "no confrontation" when Walsh was fired. Walsh's attorney Michael Levy called Pioli's explanation a "complete fabrication...a predictable and pathetic effort to smear Mr. Walsh's character rather than confront the truth about the Patriots' conduct."

In the interview, Belichick also addressed his interpretation of Article 9 of the NFL Constitution and Bylaws, for which the Patriots were penalized for violating. Belichick believed the taping was legal as long as the tape wasn't used during the same game, saying "my interpretation was that you can't utilize anything to assist you during that game. What our camera guys do is clearly not allowed to be used during the game and has never been used during that game that it was shot." He also added the team using the tapes for "halftime adjustments" was "never, never" the case. Once the Patriots were penalized, Belichick said, "the practice was immediately stopped." He also issued an apology for not contacting the league regarding his interpretation of a "gray area" in the rule and called the incident "my responsibility."

Later, during the NFL's owners meetings on April 1, 2008, Belichick said that the team had taken the situation as "a positive," modifying organization procedures so that "everything is being done on a more efficient and more accountable basis" so that a similar situation would never again arise. On the same day, Belichick and Kraft both gave private addresses to all other NFL owners and coaches, in which Kraft apologized for the illegal filming and Belichick reiterated his belief that he thought the filming was within the rules. Indianapolis Colts head coach Tony Dungy called the speeches "heartfelt," while Colts president Bill Polian said the gesture was "typical of the class [Kraft] has."

=== NFL/Walsh indemnity agreement ===
On March 9, 2008, the NFL announced that it was close to a deal with Walsh and his attorney that would indemnify Walsh against any legal or financial damages if NFL investigators were to interview him. By the start of the NFL's owners meetings on March 31, 2008, with the NFL not having yet reached any agreement with Walsh, Kraft said the "damaging allegation made by a newspaper" was something that he believed "never happened." Kraft added that Walsh, who he did not remember from his time with the Patriots, never signed any confidentiality statement with the team.

On April 23, 2008, the NFL announced it had reached an indemnity agreement with Walsh and had arranged a May 13, 2008 meeting between Walsh and Goodell. Under the terms of the deal, Walsh was required to share any information he may have regarding the Patriots' activities during Walsh's employment with the team from 1997 until 2003, and also to turn over any tapes and other items in his possession to the NFL by a May 8, 2008 deadline. The Patriots and the NFL promised not to sue Walsh and also agreed to indemnify Walsh for any legal expenses involved with the interview process, so long as he complied with the terms of the agreement. Moreover, the agreement stipulated that the NFL would preserve the evidence turned over by Walsh, and that Walsh could retain copies, but could not release those copies to third parties without NFL permission.

=== May 13, 2008 meetings ===
==== Walsh sends tapes in advance ====
In compliance with the May 8 deadline, Walsh sent eight videotapes to the league offices in advance of the meeting:

- One tape from the Miami Dolphins game on September 24, 2000
- Two tapes, one offensive signals and one defensive signals, from the Dolphins game on October 7, 2001
- One tape from the Buffalo Bills game on November 11, 2001
- One tape from the Cleveland Browns game on December 9, 2001
- Two tapes from the January 27, 2002, AFC Championship Game against the Pittsburgh Steelers
- One tape, from a "third camera", from the San Diego Chargers game on September 29, 2002

Levy told The New York Times that Walsh did not have a tape of the Rams' Super Bowl XXXVI walkthrough nor was he the source for the original Boston Herald article that made the allegation, as had been speculated by some in the media. While the Patriots withheld from comment, NFL Senior Vice President of Public Relations Greg Aiello told The Boston Globe that the received tapes were consistent with what the league already knew and what the Patriots had admitted to when interviewed after the September 2007 incident. Meanwhile, Specter issued a statement in response to Aiello's comments, saying "I think it is very unfortunate that the NFL has already started its ‘nothing new’ spin before watching the tapes or finding out what Mr. Matt Walsh has to say. Let's see where the evidence leads." Specter also scheduled a meeting with Walsh and Levy in Washington, D.C., on May 13, 2008, after Walsh's meeting with Goodell in New York City earlier that day.

==== Meeting between Walsh and Goodell ====
On the morning of May 13, 2008, Walsh, Goodell, and other officials and lawyers met for more than three hours in the NFL offices in New York City. During the meeting, a contingent of media was shown clips from the videotapes that were sent to the NFL by Walsh, almost all of which contained shots of coaches' signals, the scoreboard, and an upper-level end zone view of the play.

Goodell then held a press conference, in which he reiterated the NFL's prior statement that Walsh's main information on the Patriots' practices were consistent with what the league already knew and had disciplined the team for. Walsh told Goodell in the meeting that there was no tape of the Rams' walkthrough before Super Bowl XXXVI, that nobody asked Walsh to tape it, and that Walsh was not aware of anyone else who had taped it. When the Rams held the walkthrough, Walsh said he and other Patriots employees were in the stadium setting up video equipment for the game wearing team apparel. After the press conference, NFL outside counsel Gregg Levy told a group of reporters that Walsh, when interviewed, said he told then-Patriots defensive assistant Brian Daboll afterwards about the use of the Rams' Marshall Faulk as a kick returner and the movement of a tight end in an offensive formation in the walkthrough. Daboll then asked Walsh to diagram the formation. The NFL later re-interviewed Daboll, who did not recollect the conversation; the NFL also noted that even if a conversation occurred, it would not have been against the rules, as Walsh was authorized to be at the stadium, did not act in a clandestine manner, and was not instructed to observe the practice.

Walsh also told Goodell during the morning interview that the Patriots had, against league rules, used a player on injured reserve during a practice in 2001, and that Walsh had scalped Super Bowl tickets for certain players also during that time. While Goodell said that the use of the injured reserve player in a practice would normally result in a team fine, he would not levy additional fines against the team or Belichick after issuing $750,000 worth of fines collectively after the initial incident in September 2007. Walsh also told Goodell he was not aware of the Patriots bugging locker rooms, manipulating communications systems or crowd noise, or placing microphones on players to record signals or audibles; all were allegations made against the Patriots at one point or another.

Further, Walsh revealed to Goodell that the tapes of the signals stayed with Walsh throughout the game, were not processed during halftime, and were given to Patriots Football Research Director Ernie Adams after the game. Goodell, who acknowledged in September 2007 that the tapes gave the Patriots no competitive advantage while the game was underway, reiterated the fact that the tapes were not processed during halftime in his post-meeting press conference, but said he had never accepted Belichick's interpretation of the rules as not prohibiting tapes that are not used within the same game.

Later in the day, the Patriots released the following statement:

"We want to address the allegation that the Patriots taped the Rams’ walkthrough prior to Super Bowl XXXVI. For the past three-and-a-half months, we have been defending ourselves against assumptions made based on an unsubstantiated report rather than on facts or evidence. Despite our adamant denials, the report ran on February 2, 2008, the day before Super Bowl XLII. That game was the second-most watched program in television history and it is unfortunate that today’s news will not also reach an audience of that size. We hope that with Matt Walsh's disclosures, everyone will finally believe what we have been saying all along and emphatically stated on the day of the initial report: 'The suggestion that the New England Patriots recorded the St. Louis Rams' walkthrough on the day before Super Bowl XXXVI in 2002 is absolutely false. Any suggestion to the contrary is untrue.'"

==== Meeting between Walsh and Specter ====
After the May 13 meeting with Goodell in New York City, Walsh and Michael Levy traveled to Washington, D.C., to meet with Specter. Due to a late arrival and an expected lengthy meeting, Specter's office postponed their scheduled press conference until May 14, 2008.

The day after meeting with Specter, Walsh was interviewed by The New York Times in Michael Levy's offices. Walsh told the newspaper that he discussed with video director Jimmy Dee alibis to use if he was questioned by opposing teams as to his activity while videotaping signals, such as shooting down-and-distance markers in place of the scoreboard, but noted that he never had to use one. Specter also released a floor statement following the meeting that mentioned Walsh turning his Patriots sweater inside-out and being issued a generic, not team, credential for the 2002 Patriots-Steelers AFC Championship game. Walsh also noted that he was surprised when he heard of Belichick's comments that Belichick "couldn't pick Walsh out of a lineup," because Belichick had spoken with Walsh on more than one occasion, and Bill's former wife Debbie gave Walsh a sweater for Christmas in 2001.

In a May 16, 2008 interview with Armen Keteyian of CBS News, Belichick responded to Walsh's comments, saying that Walsh "had a way of embellishing stories," that the two "really didn't have much of a relationship" and "very rarely saw or talked to each other," and that he didn't think he would recognize him prior to his publicity. Belichick said that Walsh's claim that the Patriots were deceptive in going about their videotaping was "never the case," and noted that Walsh was in full Patriots gear because Belichick "felt like what [the Patriots] were doing was OK."

Still, Belichick said that the team's continuation of the videotaping practice following the Ray Anderson memo in 2006 was a "mistake" that Belichick took responsibility for. Belichick regretted not going to the league to check on the legality of their practice following the receiving of the memo, but instead allowed his interpretation of the Constitution and Bylaws to "override it." Belichick added that if the team was intentionally risking breaking the rules, they wouldn't have conducted the practice as indiscreetly as they did, which Belichick evidenced by opposing coaches waving at the camera recording the signals, and by the fact that regular game videotapes, that were sent to each team, clearly showed Walsh videotaping in Patriots gear. Belichick also expounded on the process that went into using the videotapes, explaining how Adams was sometimes able to glean information from them, but the signals were only part of a "mosaic" of other elements of game planning and preparation. In response to the notion that videotaping the signals gave the team an advantage over just observing and recording them by hand, Belichick stated that while most teams, including the Patriots, protected their signals by frequently changing them or using a wristband system, teams were able to decipher signals without tape, as they were available to everyone to see, and that the Patriots taped them for convenience and as a better studying method.

=== Boston Herald apology ===
In their May 14, 2008, issue the Boston Herald published an apology to the Patriots and their fans for publishing the February 2, 2008, story that cited an unnamed source in alleging the Patriots had taped the Rams' walkthrough prior to Super Bowl XXXVI. The newspaper said that while they believed their source to be credible, they never viewed a videotape of the walkthrough, or talked to anyone that had. Thus, they wrote, they should not have published the story, which they deemed to be false, "in the absence of firmer verification." The next day, Boston Herald Editor-in-Chief Kevin Convey took full responsibility for the publication of the story, while standing behind the work of Tomase and the Herald's sports department.

In an interview with CNBC the same day, Kraft said he was bothered that there would still be people throughout the country who would not see the retraction, and that he felt vindicated after the "damaging" story "put a cloud over [the team] for three-and-a-half months." Kraft added that he believed there was no other team in sports history who had gone through such scrutiny as the Patriots did following the initial incident in September 2007, and that the Patriots had done a full audit of their organizational procedures, with lawyers now helping the team administer the NFL rulebook, which Kraft realized "was beyond the scope of a coaching staff, or personnel people, to administe[r] properly."

Robert Kraft's son, Patriots president Jonathan Kraft, spoke to WEEI the next day about the apology, which he appreciated, but believed was "delayed in coming." He said that the Herald called the team an hour before the paper went to press, and that despite the Patriots telling the Herald "adamantly, in the strongest terms possible, both through comments from [Belichick] and [the Patriots]' legal team, that it was not appropriate to run that story," the Herald published the article the next day. In the ensuing three months, per Kraft, it was understood throughout the country that the Patriots had taped the walkthrough as a result of the article, and according to the Patriots public relations department, another 300,000 other newspaper articles referencing the Herald's report; Kraft said he did not know how the team could reach that group to take back that belief. In the wake of the incident, Kraft also said the Patriots' lawyers and administrators now go over every rule change and clarification with the coaching staff and ask the staff to come to them first on any rule interpretation questions. Kraft dismissed the allegations of the Patriots tampering with sideline communication systems or playclocks, as those were both operated by league, not team, officials. Finally, Kraft said the Patriots looked to move on from the false report and to re-establish their prior relationship with the Herald.

Tomase explained the lead-up to the publishing of the false report in the Boston Herald's edition of May 16, 2008. Tomase said that he first heard of the rumor late in the 2006 season, but dismissed it until the rumor resurfaced from a "much stronger source" after the September 2007 incident. Two days before the Super Bowl, once The New York Times and ESPN published stories about Matt Walsh, Tomase said Walsh's name "set off alarms," as "many believed he had filmed the walkthrough." Tomase added that despite warnings from the Patriots and other reporters, he was "caught up in the moment" and "hadn't stepped back to consider the ramifications." While the report cited one unnamed source, Tomase said that while he had multiple sources for the story, he relied on one more than any other, and refused to name that source. Finally, Tomase believed that while he never felt he was being lied to by his source, he should not have written the story in the absence of seeing the tape or getting comments from members of the organization.

In the weeks after Deflategate in 2015 between the Patriots and Colts, ESPN ran several stories citing the Boston Herald article. On August 20, 2015, ESPN issued an apology.

=== Specter's calls for independent investigation ===
A day after privately speaking with Walsh in his Washington, D.C., offices, Specter held a press conference to announce his desire for an independent investigation into the Patriots' videotaping practices. Specter cited Senator George J. Mitchell's (D-ME) report ("The Mitchell Report") into steroids use in baseball as an example of an impartial, outside investigation. Specter said he believed there was a conflict of interest in the NFL's investigation of the Patriots' practices, and criticized the NFL for allowing Patriots attorney Dan Goldberg into Walsh's meeting with Goodell and letting him ask questions. He also said that he felt the Patriots owed the public "a lot more candor and a lot more credibility" with regard to their practices.

Specter also spoke of his own meeting with Walsh, who told Specter of a former Patriots offensive player who told Walsh about being called into a meeting with Belichick, Adams, and then-offensive coordinator Charlie Weis before a September 3, 2000 game against the Tampa Bay Buccaneers, at which point the player was instructed to memorize previously recorded defensive signals on tape, watch for the signals from the sidelines during the game, and relay them to Weis. This, according to the player, allowed the Patriots to anticipate 75 percent of the defense's plays being called.

In the press conference, Specter also noted that Walsh, while taping signals during a game against the Jets, stood next to a Jets videographer who, to Walsh, also appeared to be taping signals. Walsh later elaborated, saying the Jets cameraman was angling his camera towards the Patriots sidelines, and that Walsh did not question him about his activity because Walsh knew he himself was doing the same thing. Walsh later advised then-defensive coordinator Romeo Crennel to change the team's signals in light of the event.

On May 15, 2008, Senator Ted Kennedy (D-MA), who at the time, along with Specter sat on the United States Senate Committee on the Judiciary, commented on Specter's initiative, saying: "With the war in Iraq raging on, gasoline prices closing in on $4 a gallon, and Americans losing their homes at record rates to foreclosure, the United States Senate should be focusing on the real problems that Americans are struggling with."

In a June 16, 2008 interview with the Philadelphia Daily News, Specter said he "had gone as far as he could" with the matter, and would not request a senate hearing.

=== 2015 ESPN report ===
In a report for ESPN, Don Van Natta Jr. and Seth Wickersham contend that commissioner Roger Goodell's handling of Deflategate was influenced by his hasty and incomplete handling of the Spygate incident. Van Natta Jr. and Wickersham argue that the true extent of the Spygate scandal was covered up by Goodell and the National Football League in order to protect the image of the NFL and as a favor to New England Patriots' owner Robert Kraft, who was in part responsible for Goodell's promotion to commissioner. The report alleges a highly complex system in which opposing teams' signals were recorded, decoded, and relayed to Patriots coaches and players on the field during games spanning at least 40 games between 2000 and 2007. This system also included a personal assistant to Belichick who had a photographic memory and had the official title "football research director", the only person with such a title in the NFL, he told congress stories about sneaking behind opponents benches and filming their huddles. According to the article a scout team would go out to future Patriot opponents and film signs and plays. They would then make a spreadsheet of all the signs and corresponding plays, and Patriot staff would then hand off the spreadsheets to the "football research director" who would match signals to the plays. The Patriots would also sometimes bring in former players of the team they were playing and ask them if they accurately had recorded the signals, later on they would cut the player.

The article goes on to quote a former Patriots assistant as saying "things got out of control," in reference to the entire system of covert taping and signal decoding.

In a statement from Mike Martz, the St. Louis Rams ex-offensive coordinator and coach also recalls that Goodell asked him to write a statement, saying that he was satisfied with the NFL's Spygate investigation and was certain the Patriots had not cheated and asking everyone to move on—like leaders of the Steelers and Eagles had done. A congressional inquiry that would put league officials under oath had to be avoided, Martz recalls Goodell telling him. "If it ever got to an investigation, it would be terrible for the league," Goodell said.

== Accusations in 2010 against Broncos ==
On November 27, 2010, the NFL fined the Denver Broncos and their head coach Josh McDaniels, who served as an assistant coach under Belichick from 2001–2008 and again from 2012–2021, $50,000 each after Broncos video director Steve Scarnecchia videotaped the San Francisco 49ers' walkthrough practice prior to the October 30, 2010 NFL International Series game in Wembley Stadium, London. Scarnecchia, the son of longtime Patriots offensive line coach Dante Scarnecchia, was a video assistant for the Patriots in 2001–2004, before joining the Jets' video department for the 2006–2007 seasons. As a result of the NFL's findings, Scarnecchia was fired by the Broncos, and is subject to a hearing regarding a possible ban from the NFL for twice being involved in an integrity-of-game policy violation.

== See also ==
- Deflategate
- New Orleans Saints bounty scandal
- Houston Astros sign stealing scandal
- Michigan Wolverines football sign-stealing scandal
- Canada Soccer drone spying scandal
- Southampton F.C. espionage incident
- List of scandals with "-gate" suffix
