= Dale Ho =

American judge (born 1977)

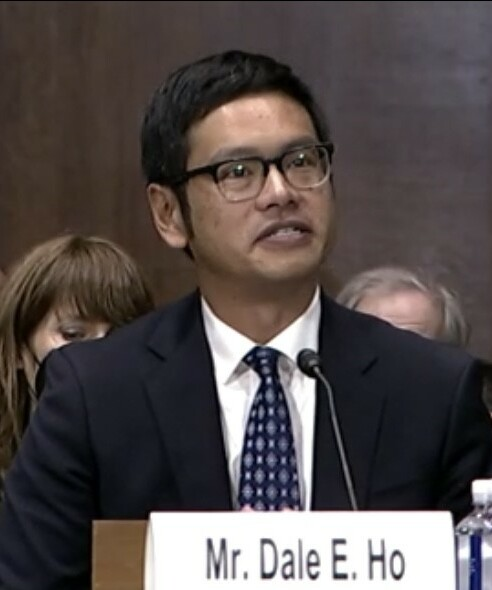

Judge of the United States District Court for the Southern District of New York
- Incumbent
- Assumed office August 18, 2023
- Appointed by: Joe Biden
- Preceded by: Katherine B. Forrest

Personal details
- Born: Dale Edwin Ho; 1977 (age 48–49) San Jose, California, U.S.
- Education: Princeton University (BA); Yale University (JD)

Dale Edwin Ho (born 1977) is an American lawyer serving as a United States district judge of the United States District Court for the Southern District of New York. Prior to becoming a judge, he was the director of the American Civil Liberties Union's voting rights project.

== Early life and education ==
Ho was born in 1977 in San Jose, California to immigrants to the United States from the Philippines. He received his Bachelor of Arts in political philosophy, summa cum laude, from Princeton University in 1999 and was elected to Phi Beta Kappa. He then received his Juris Doctor from Yale Law School in 2005.

== Career ==
Ho served as a law clerk to Judge Barbara S. Jones of the United States District Court for the Southern District of New York from 2005 to 2006 and Associate Judge Robert S. Smith of the New York Court of Appeals from 2006 to 2007. Through a one-year Fried Frank Civil Rights Fellowship, he worked for the law firm Fried, Frank, Harris, Shriver & Jacobson as an NAACP Legal Defense & Educational Fund, Inc. (NAACP LDF) Fellow from 2007 to 2009. He then worked as a staff attorney with the NAACP LDF from 2009 to 2013, where he worked on legislative redistricting projects, including anti-gerrymandering efforts.

In 2013, Ho became Director of the American Civil Liberties Union (ACLU) Voting Rights Project. In 2014, Ho began teaching election law as an Adjunct Assistant Professor of Law at Brooklyn Law School starting in 2013, and a racial justice clinic as an adjunct professor at the New York University School of Law starting in 2014.

In 2019, Ho was one of five ACLU lawyers featured in the documentary The Fight, produced by actress Kerry Washington, which followed his preparation, oral argument, and reaction in the United States Supreme Court proceedings around Department of Commerce v. New York (see Notable cases, below).

=== Notable cases ===
In 2018, Ho was a lead attorney in Fish v. Kobach, in which the district court ruled that it was illegal to require documentary proof of citizenship in order to register to vote. Ho argued the case before the United States Court of Appeals for the Tenth Circuit, which affirmed the Kansas district court's ruling.

Ho argued twice against the Trump administration in front of the Supreme Court of the United States. In Department of Commerce v. New York (2019), Ho represented a coalition of immigrant advocacy groups who successfully challenged Donald Trump's plan to include a citizenship question on the 2020 United States census questionnaire.

In Trump v. New York (2020), the ACLU unsuccessfully challenged the Trump administration's plan to exclude illegal immigrants from the U.S. congressional apportionment process.

=== Federal judicial service ===
From the start of President Joe Biden's administration, Ho had been considered a potential nominee for a federal judgeship. The public criminal defense and voting rights attorney was a candidate of the Biden administration's program to open up the field to practitioners outside the traditional pool of corporate lawyers and prosecutors. On June 7, 2021, U.S. Senate Majority Leader Chuck Schumer recommended Ho for a federal judgeship to the United States District Court for the Southern District of New York. On September 30, 2021, Biden nominated Ho to serve as a judge of that court, to the seat vacated by Judge Katherine B. Forrest, who resigned on September 11, 2018.

On December 1, 2021, a hearing on his nomination was held before the Senate Judiciary Committee. During his confirmation hearing, Ho apologized for his "overheated rhetoric" on social media, which included past tweets critical of three Republican members of the Senate Judiciary Committee, Marsha Blackburn, Mike Lee, and Tom Cotton. He was questioned by senators over a tweet in which he appeared to refer to himself as a "wild-eyed sort of leftist"; he explained that he was "referring to a caricature of the way other people may have described me, not how I would describe myself." A resurfaced video from 2018 showed Ho calling the U.S. Senate and the Electoral College "undemocratic" and arguing that voting should be made easier and that people with criminal convictions should not lose the right to vote. The conservative Judicial Crisis Network launched a $300,000 television ad campaign against Ho, the group's first TV campaign against a Biden judicial nominee; in response, progressive group Demand Justice launched a six-figure ad campaign in support of Ho.

On January 3, 2022, his nomination was returned to President Biden under Rule XXXI, Paragraph 6 of the United States Senate; he was renominated the same day. On January 20, 2022, the committee failed to report his nomination by an 11–11 vote. On June 14, 2023, the Senate invoked cloture on his nomination by a 50–49 vote. Senator Joe Manchin was the only Democrat to vote against cloture and against confirmation of Ho's nomination, stating Ho was "extreme left" and accusing him of "hateful words" and "partisanship." Later that same day, his nomination was confirmed by a 50–49 vote. Ho was only the second ACLU lawyer to be confirmed directly to the federal bench as an Article III judge, after Ruth Bader Ginsburg. He received his judicial commission on August 18, 2023.

=== Notable cases as a judge ===
On September 25, 2024, he was assigned to the prosecution of New York City Mayor Eric Adams, No. 24-cr-556 (S.D.N.Y.).

On May 1, 2026, Judge Ho blocked a Department of Homeland Security plan which would have ended temporary protected status for Yemeni nationals in the US, who are affected by ongoing civil war.

== Personal life ==
Ho is a member of the First Unitarian Congregational Society of Brooklyn.

== See also ==
- Joe Biden judicial appointment controversies
- List of Asian American jurists

Legal offices
Preceded by Katherine B. Forrest	Judge of the United States District Court for the Southern District of New York; 2023–present	Incumbent
