= Richard S. Forrest =

American novelist

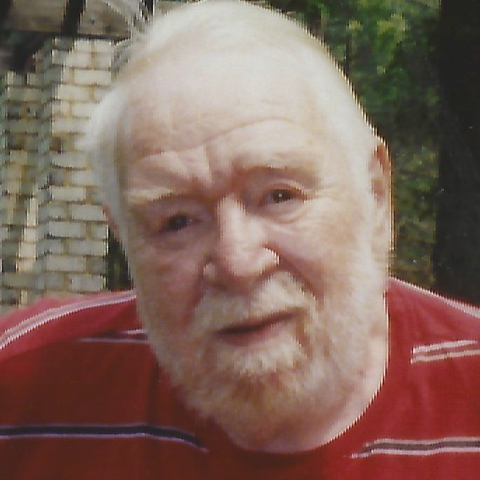
- Born: Richard Stockton Forrest; May 8, 1932; Upper Montclair, New Jersey, U.S.
- Died: March 14, 2005 (aged 72); Towson, Maryland, U.S.
- Occupation: Author
- Known for: Mystery novels
- Spouse(s): Mary Bolan (d. 1996), Patricia Hale Forrest
- Children: 6, including Katherine Forrest; 2 stepchildren

Richard Stockton Forrest (May 8, 1932 – March 14, 2005) was an American mystery and suspense novelist and short story author.

== Biography ==
Forrest was born in Upper Montclair, New Jersey. Although his family moved frequently, he spent most of his childhood living in New Jersey, graduating from Ridgewood High School in 1950, where he received awards in drama and journalism. He studied in the New York Dramatic Workshop in 1950 under the German director Erwin Piscator. He enlisted in the U.S. Army in 1951 and served in various locations in the United States.

While writing plays and novels at night, he worked in the title insurance industry from 1958 to 1972, when he left his position to become a full-time writer. His first novel, Who Killed Mr. Garland's Mistress, was published in 1974 and was nominated for an Edgar Award. His family received food stamps in the late 1970s and were briefly homeless.

In addition to the U.S., Forrest's novels and short stories were published in the U.K., Japan, Italy, Finland, France, Germany, and Sweden.

== Personal life and death ==
Forrest was married twice, to Mary Bolan, a geriatric nurse who died in 1996, and to Patricia Hale Forrest. He had six children, including Katherine Forrest, a lawyer and former United States district judge, and two stepchildren, and lived in Charlottesville, Virginia. He died in 2005. His collected papers are stored in the Howard Gotlieb Archival Research Center at Boston University.

== Books ==
=== Lyon and Bea Wentworth Mystery Series ===
The Lyon and Bea Wentworth Mystery Series comprises 10 novels set in a small town called Murphysville, Connecticut. Lyon Wentworth and his wife, Bea Wentworth, a state senator, team up with Police Chief Rocco Herbert, Lyon's wartime buddy, to unravel a variety of murder mysteries. Lyon writes children's books and is a hot air balloonist. The New York Times Book Review called the first book in the series, A Child's Garden of Death, "a curiously absorbing book, and a compassionate one."

- A Child's Garden of Death (1975)
- The Wizard of Death (1977)
- Death Through the Looking Glass (1978)
- The Death in the Willows (1979)
- The Death at Yew Corner (1980)
- Death Under the Lilacs (1985)
- Death on the Mississippi (1989)
- The Piped Piper of Death (1997)
- Death in the Secret Garden (2004)
- Death at King Arthur's Court (2005), published posthumously

=== Sign Mystery Series with Diff James ===
Forrest wrote three novels for youth and low fluency adults as part of "The Thumbprint Mysteries" series, all featuring Diff James, a mute woodsman with an uncanny ability to understand animals.

- Sign of the Beast (1998)
- Sign of Blood (1998)
- Sign of Terror (1999)

=== Non-series novels ===
- Who Killed Mr. Garland's Mistress (1974)
- The Killing Edge (1980)
- Lark (1986)
- The Disappearing Airplane (1996–1997) - serialized in 21 parts in Asahi Weekly
- Murder in the Big Apple (1999) - serialized in 20 parts in Asahi Weekly
- The Impossible Crime (2002) - serialized in 25 parts in Asahi Weekly

=== Non-series novels published under the pseudonym Stockton Woods ===
- The Laughing Man (1980)
- Game Bet (1981)
- The Man Who Heard Too Much (1983)

== Short stories ==
=== General fiction ===
- "Bellamy Thurgood Learns to Skate" (January 1983) - Northeast Magazine, The Hartford Courant
- "Family Friends" (February 1983) - Northeast Magazine, The Hartford Courant
- "Sailors" (July 1983) - Northeast Magazine, The Hartford Courant
- "The Crooked Tree" (December 1983) - Northeast Magazine, The Hartford Courant
- "Crossing the Moat" (1993) St. Raphael's Better Health Writing Contest Winner

=== Mystery ===
- "Mark of the Beast" (1976) - Mystery Monthly
- "Return of the Beast" (1976) - Mystery Monthly
- "The Headmaster Helps One of His Boys" (1982) - Ellery Queen's Mystery Magazine
- "A Very Small Rasher" (1994) - Ellery Queen's Mystery Magazine
- "Lazy Man" (1998) - Ellery Queen's Mystery Magazine

== Non-fiction ==
- (with Mary Forrest and his son, Christopher Forrest) Nursing Homes: The Complete Guide (1990)
- (with Mary Forrest and his son, Christopher Forrest) Retirement Living: A Guide to Housing Alternatives (1991)
