= Katherine B. Forrest =

American lawyer and former judge (born 1964)

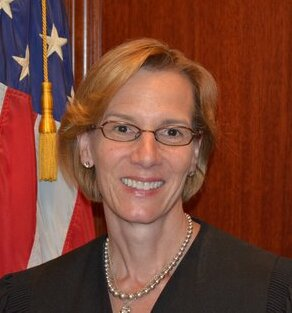

Judge of the United States District Court for the Southern District of New York
- In office October 17, 2011 – September 11, 2018
- Appointed by: Barack Obama
- Preceded by: Jed S. Rakoff
- Succeeded by: Dale Ho

Personal details
- Born: February 13, 1964 (age 62) New York City, New York, U.S.
- Education: Wesleyan University (BA); New York University (JD)

Katherine Bolan Forrest (born February 13, 1964) is a partner at New York law firm Paul, Weiss, Rifkind, Wharton & Garrison LLP, and a former United States district judge of the United States District Court for the Southern District of New York.

== Early life, education and personal life ==
Katherine Bolan Forrest was born in New York in 1964 and grew up in Connecticut, one of six children. Her father, Richard S. Forrest, wrote mystery novels. Her mother, Mary Bolan Brumby, was a nurse. The family received food stamps for four years, beginning when Katherine was 12. They were homeless for six months. "I came from nothing," Forrest said. "I came from a father who made no money. He was a playwright and then a writer, and even though he published many books, I was a complete scholarship student all the way through."

Forrest attended Choate Rosemary Hall, a private school in Wallingford, Connecticut, on a scholarship, graduating in 1982. She earned a Bachelor of Arts with honors in 1986 from Wesleyan University. She received her Juris Doctor in 1990 from the New York University School of Law. She pursued a joint program at New York University that would have led to a J.D. and a Ph.D. in history, with an eye toward an academic career. Her focus shifted when she took a summer job at Cravath, Swaine & Moore LLP after her second year of law school. "I realized that commercial litigation was far more interesting than I thought it would be," Forrest said. She is the mother of two children.

== Career ==
Forrest joined the New York law firm Cravath, Swaine & Moore right out of law school in 1990, becoming a partner in 1998 and handling an array of commercial litigation with a particular focus on antitrust, copyright and digital media. She was cited as one of the country's leading practitioners in the antitrust and intellectual property arenas in Chambers USA 2007: America's Leading Lawyers for Business. The American Lawyer also cited Forrest as one of the top 50 young litigators in the U.S. and by Lawdragon as one of the leading litigators in the nation. In 2005, she was named in the Global Competition Review (GCR) in the "40 Under 40" issue "as one of the top competition practitioners or economists worldwide." Forrest was also profiled in the GCR "as one of the top women antitrust practitioners worldwide." In 2010, Forrest represented United Airlines in winning approval for its merger with Continental Airlines. In October 2010, Forrest left Cravath when Assistant Attorney General Christine A. Varney recruited her to join the United States Department of Justice as a Deputy Assistant Attorney General in the Antitrust Division.

=== Federal judicial service ===
On May 4, 2011, President Barack Obama nominated Forrest to fill a judicial seat on the United States District Court for the Southern District of New York that had been vacated by Judge Jed S. Rakoff, who took senior status at the end of 2010. Obama nominated Forrest to the bench in May 2011 on the recommendation of U.S. Senator Charles Schumer of New York. The U.S. Senate confirmed Forrest in a voice vote on October 13, 2011. She received her judicial commission on October 17, 2011. Forrest presided over several thousand cases, including more than 100 trials, and, in 2016, became chair of the Grievance Committee for the Southern District. On July 18, 2018, Forrest announced her resignation from the bench, effective September 11, 2018. After resigning from the federal bench, she returned to work as a firm’s litigation department partner at Cravath.

=== Significant cases ===
In 2012, in Hedges v. Obama, Forrest issued a permanent injunction that blocked enforcement of Section 1021 of the 2012 National Defense Authorization Act (NDAA), which authorized the president to order the military to indefinitely detain any person deemed to be a member of, or to have provided substantially support to, "al-Qaeda, the Taliban, or associated forces." The plaintiffs in the suit challenged the 2012 NDAA provision as a violation of the First Amendment's right to free speech and free association and the Fifth Amendment's Due Process Clause. In 2013, a Second Circuit panel unanimously reversed Forrest's ruling, holding that the plaintiffs lacked standing.

In July 2013, Forrest ordered the release of $1.75 billion in Iranian frozen assets held by Bank Markazi (Iran's central bank) in a New York Citibank account to create a fund for families of the victims of the 1983 bombing of a U.S. Marines compound in Beirut, Lebanon. Forrest rejected the Iranian government's invocation of the Foreign Sovereign Immunities Act, holding that Iran's conduct fell under an exception to FSIA. Forrest's ruling in Peterson v. Iran was upheld by the U.S. Supreme Court in Bank Markazi v. Peterson (2016), in which the Court held, in a 6-2 ruling, that the families should be allowed to collect the Iranian funds.

In In re Aluminum Warehousing Antitrust Litigation (2014), Forrest dismissed an antitrust (price-fixing) suit against Goldman Sachs, JP Morgan Chase, and Glencore. She held that, although the defendants' actions did affect the aluminum marketplace, the plaintiffs failed to show the defendants had intended to manipulate prices.

In 2015, Forrest presided over a jury trial in United States v. Ulbricht, where Ross William Ulbricht was accused of running the Silk Road online drug marketplace. During the trial, Forrest was doxed on 8chan, where her full mailing address, phone number, and Social Security number were posted on the baphomet subboard. In regard to the defense team's argument that Silk Road enhanced safety by moving illegal drug activity away from real life drug dealing scenarios, Forrest stated, "No drug dealer from the Bronx has ever made this argument to the court. It's a privileged argument, and it's an argument made by one of the privileged." Forrest sentenced Ulbricht to two life terms, plus an additional 40 years, without the possibility of parole. The Department of Justice then subpoenaed Reason Magazine regarding reactions in the comments section of its article on the sentencing.

From April 2016 to August 2017, Forrest presided over the civil lawsuit Hosseinzadeh v. Klein, in a case where notable YouTubers Ethan and Hila Klein, known on YouTube as h3h3Productions, were accused of copyright infringement by fellow YouTuber Matt Hosseinzadeh. In her decision, Forrest ruled in favor of Ethan and Hila Klein, stating that the video in question, accused of copyright infringement, was "quintessential criticism and comment" of Hosseinzadeh's video and falls under the protection of "fair use." Hosseinzadeh's additional claims of DMCA misrepresentation and defamation were also dismissed. In her ruling, Forrest also noted that while the Klein video may be classified as a "reaction video," not all reaction videos would fall under the fair use doctrine.

In Ragbir v. Sessions (2018), Forrest ordered U.S. Immigration and Customs Enforcement to halt the deportation of Ravidath (Ravi) Ragbir, an immigrant from Trinidad who had become an activist in the United States. Ragbir became a legal permanent resident in 1994 but had been convicted of wire fraud in 2001; it was uncontested that, since being released, Ragbir had been rehabilitated and had "lived a life of a redeemed man." Ragbir spent nine years in the U.S. under a "stay of removal," regularly reporting to immigration authorities as required, until he was abruptly arrested in January 2018, upending his career and separating him from his wife and daughter, both U.S. citizens. In her opinion ordering Ragbir's release, Forrest wrote, "Constitutional principles of due process and the avoidance of unnecessary cruelty here allow and provide for an orderly departure. Petitioner is entitled to the freedom to say goodbye." Forrest wrote that this was "the freedom to hug one's spouse and children, the freedom to organize the myriad of human affairs that collect over time," she criticized practices associated "with regimes we revile as unjust, regimes where those who have long lived in a country may be taken without notice from streets, home, and work and sent away. We are not that country, and woe be the day we become that country under a fiction that laws allow it." The Second Circuit later continued to stay Ragbir's deportation pending further hearings.

In February 2018, Forrest ruled that Breitbart News, Heavy, Inc., TIME, Yahoo, Vox.com, Gannett Company, Herald Media, The Boston Globe, and New England Sports Network had violated the rights of Justin Goldman by embedding a link to a tweet of an image taken by Goldman of Tom Brady on their respective websites. Goldman claimed he had the exclusive right to display the image and had not been contacted for a license or publicly released the photo. The photo was first posted to Goldman's Snapchat account.

In April 2018, Forrest sentenced former Mobile Messenger CEO Darcy Wedd to 10 years in prison for his involvement in a fraudulent mobile phone “auto-subscribing” scheme, after a jury convicted him in December 2017. The scheme charged mobile phone users millions of dollars in monthly fees for unsolicited and recurring text messages, without their knowledge or consent.

=== Return to private practice ===
Following her resignation from the federal bench, Forrest returned to practice in the litigation department at Cravath, Swaine & Moore. In 2019, she was named a “Notable Woman in Law” by Crain’s New York Business and profiled as one of Benchmark Litigation’s “Top 250 Women in Litigation”. Forrest is also an adjunct professor at New York University School of Law, where she co-teaches a course on Quantitative Methods and the Law.

Forrest represented the Boston Red Sox in a proposed class action alleging that the Major League Baseball team had undermined fantasy sports contests by covering up sign stealing schemes in a case dismissed with prejudice in April 2020.

Legal offices
| Preceded by Jed S. Rakoff | Judge of the United States District Court for the Southern District of New York; 2011–2018 | Succeeded by Dale Ho |
