= Hedges v. Obama =

American legal case

- Court: United States Court of Appeals for the Second Circuit
- Full case name: Christopher Hedges, Daniel Ellsberg, Jenifer Bolen, Noam Chomsky, Alexa O'Brien, US Day of Rage, Kai Wargalla, Hon. Birgitta Jonsdottir, M.P. (Plaintiffs-Appelles) v. Barack Obama (individually and as a representative of the United States of America), Leon Panetta (individually and as a representative of the Department of Defense) (Defendant-Appellants), John McCain, John Boehner, Harry Reid, Nancy Pelosi, Mitch McConnell, Eric Cantor as representatives of the United States of America (Defendants)
- Decided: July 17, 2013

Case history
- Prior actions: District Court granted plaintiffs request for a permanent injunction of the indefinite detention powers of the National Defense Authorization Act for Fiscal Year 2012 (NDAA), permanently enjoined enforcement of § 1021(b)(2) of the NDAA by the U.S. Government and struck down § 1021(b)(2) as unconstitutional.
- Subsequent actions: District Court holding vacated and permanent injunction/enjoinment granted by District Court lifted

Holding
- The plaintiffs lacked standing to pursue their claim because they could not show that they were harmed by the NDAA.

Court membership
- Judges sitting: Amalya Kearse, Raymond Lohier and Lewis A. Kaplan

Keywords
- Detention Law, Indefinite detention

Hedges v. Obama (Note: Hedges et v. Obama, U.S. District Court for the Southern District of New York, No. 12-cv-331 and Hedges et v. Obama, 2nd U.S. Circuit Court of Appeals, No. 12-3176) was a lawsuit filed in January 2012 against the Obama administration and members of the U.S. Congress by a group including former New York Times reporter Christopher Hedges, challenging the National Defense Authorization Act for Fiscal Year 2012 (NDAA). The legislation permitted the U.S. government to indefinitely detain people "who are part of or substantially support Al Qaeda, the Taliban or associated forces engaged in hostilities against the United States". The plaintiffs contended that Section 1021(b)(2) of the law allows for detention of citizens and permanent residents taken into custody in the U.S. on "suspicion of providing substantial support" to groups engaged in hostilities against the U.S. such as al-Qaeda and the Taliban respectively that the NDAA arms the U.S. military with the ability to imprison indefinitely journalists, activists and human-rights workers based on vague allegations.

A federal court in New York issued a permanent injunction blocking the indefinite detention powers of the NDAA but the injunction was stayed by the Second Circuit Court of Appeals pending appeal by the Obama administration. On July 17, 2013, the Second Circuit Court of Appeals overturned the district court's permanent injunction blocking the indefinite detention powers of the NDAA because the plaintiffs lacked legal standing to challenge the indefinite detention powers of the NDAA. The Supreme Court declined to hear the case on April 28, 2014, leaving the Second Circuit decision intact.

== History summary ==
In May 2012, a federal court in New York issued a preliminary injunction which temporarily blocked the indefinite detention powers of the NDAA (section 1021(b) (2)) on the grounds of unconstitutionality. On August 6, 2012, federal prosecutors representing President Obama and Defense Secretary Leon Panetta filed a notice of appeal. The following day arguments from both sides were heard by U.S. District Judge Katherine B. Forrest during a hearing to determine whether to make her preliminary injunction permanent or not. On September 12, 2012, Judge Forrest issued a permanent injunction, but this was appealed by the Obama administration on September 13, 2012. A federal appeals court granted a U.S. Justice Department's request for an interim stay of the permanent injunction, pending the Second Circuit's consideration of the government's motion to stay the injunction throughout its appeal. The court also said that a Second Circuit motions panel will take up the government's motion for stay pending appeal on September 28, 2012. On October 2, 2012, the Second Circuit Court of Appeals ruled that the ban on indefinite detention will not go into effect until a decision on the Obama administration's appeal is rendered. The U.S. Supreme Court refused on December 14, 2012, to lift the stay pending appeal order issued by the U.S. Second Circuit Court of Appeals on October 2, 2012.

Oral arguments were heard before the U.S. Second Circuit Court of Appeals on February 6, 2013. The U.S. Supreme Court refused again on February 19, 2013, to lift the stay pending appeal order issued by the U.S. Second Circuit Court of Appeals on October 2, 2012. The Second Circuit Court of Appeals overturned on July 17, 2013, the district court's ruling which struck down § 1021(b)(2) of NDAA as unconstitutional because the plaintiffs lacked legal standing to challenge it. The Supreme Court denied certiorari in an order issued April 28, 2014.

== Background ==
According to the text of Section 1021 of the NDAA provided that the U.S. president may authorize the armed forces to indefinitely detain the following persons set forth in § 1021(b)(2) of the NDAA:

A person who was a part of or substantially supported al-Qaeda, the Taliban, or associated forces that are engaged in hostilities against the United States or its coalition partners, including any person who has committed a belligerent act or has directly supported such hostilities in aid of such enemy forces.

Section 1021(e) of the NDAA, provided:

Authorities.—Nothing in this section shall be construed to affect existing law or authorities relating to the detention of United States citizens, lawful resident aliens of the United States, or any other persons who are captured or arrested in the United States.

Attorneys Carl J. Mayer and Bruce I. Afran filed a complaint January 13, 2012, in the U.S. District Court for the Southern District of New York in Manhattan, against Barack Obama and Secretary of Defense Leon Panetta in the case Hedges v. Obama, 12-cv-00331, U.S. District Court, Southern District of New York (Manhattan) to challenge the legality of the Authorization for Use of Military Force as embedded in the latest version of the National Defense Authorization Act, signed by the president Dec. 31, 2011. Plaintiffs were journalist Christopher Hedges, Pentagon Papers whistleblower Daniel Ellsberg, writer and linguist Noam Chomsky, Icelandic parliamentarian Birgitta Jónsdóttir, activist and RevolutionTruth founder Jennifer Bolen, Occupy London activist Kai Wargalla, journalist and founder of "US Day of Rage" Alexa O'Brien, and American academic Cornel West. Besides Barack Obama and Leon Panetta other defendants are John McCain, John Boehner, Harry Reid, Nancy Pelosi, Mitch McConnell and Eric Cantor.

The plaintiffs said the NDAA chills speech by threatening constitutionally protected activities such as news reporting, protest and political organizing in defense of controversial causes such as the WikiLeaks case. They claim that the law not only put them at risk of arrest but also allows indefinite detentions of U.S. citizens on U.S. soil, and that the provisions are too vague. The principal allegation made by the plaintiffs against the NDAA was that the vagueness of critical terms in the NDAA could be interpreted by the federal government in a way that authorizes them to label journalists and political activists who interview or support outspoken critics of the Obama administration's policies as "covered persons," meaning that they have given "substantial support" to terrorists or other "associated groups." Fearing that section 1021(b)(2) of the NDAA could be applied to journalists and that the specter of such a scenario would have a chilling effect on free speech and freedom of the press in violation of the First Amendment, Hedges filed his lawsuit on January 12, 2012. Naomi Wolf wrote for example in her affidavit that she has refused to conduct many investigative interviews for fear that she could be detained under the auspices of applicable sections of the NDAA. Plaintiff Bolen wrote that "My activities as a civil liberties, democracy advocate and independent journalist definitely leave me under the purview of the vague language of the NDAA [National Defense Authorization Act]" because of her contact with WikiLeaks activists and that "I believe that could leave me in imminent danger of harm."

Hedges' complaint claimed that his extensive work overseas, particularly in the Middle East covering terrorist (or suspected terrorist) organizations, could cause him to be categorized as a "covered person" who, by way of such writings, interviews and/or communications, "substantially supported" or "directly supported" "al-Qaeda, the Taliban or associated forces that are engaged in hostilities against the United States or its coalition partners, ... under §1031(b)(2) and the AUMF [Authorization for Use of Military Force]."

== District Court proceedings ==
During a hearing on March 29, 2012, plaintiffs Alexa O'Brien, Kai Wargalla and Christopher Hedges testified. O'Brien testified that she shelved two investigations about Guantanamo detainees for fear of reprisal under the National Defense Authorization Act (NDAA). Wargalla said that she and other organizers from the Revolution Truth movement, which broadcasts "Live Panels" over the Internet on various topics, shelved the idea of inviting "groups like Hamas", a U.S.-designated terrorist organization, after the NDAA was passed. Hedges stated the National Defense Authorization Act affects him personally. Government lawyers in return did not offer any witnesses in support of the law.

In a post-hearing memorandum the lawyers for the plaintiffs rejected the U.S. governments repeated position that the NDAA is merely an "affirmation" of the Authorization for Use of Military Force Against Terrorists (AUMF). "This court need not and should not indulge the fiction that section 1021 merely acknowledges authority latent in the AUMF," the memo stated. The plaintiffs outlined the NDAA and AUMF in the memorandum. "AUMF authority is linked to the 9/11 attacks, and the purpose of AUMF authority is 'to prevent any future acts of international terrorism against the United States' by those involved in the 9/11 attacks, and those that harbored them," the memorandum states.

By contrast, Section 1021(b)(2) authority is linked to no event, states no specific purpose, and extends to 'covered persons' who 'substantially support' those 'that are engaged in hostilities against the United States or its coalition partners,' a far broader 'catchment' than the AUMF.

Lawmakers, free-press advocates, small-government partisans, conservative think tanks, pro-gun groups, border-control activists, civil libertarians, a pastor and a professor, acting as amici curiae, stated in this context that the constitutionality of the AUMF authorization merits review and that the NDAA violates the Treason Clause of the U.S. Constitution.

=== Preliminary injunction against enforcement of § 1021(b)(2) of the NDAA ===
A federal court in New York City issued an order blocking the indefinite detention powers of the NDAA for American citizens after finding it unconstitutional. On May 16, 2012, in response to the lawsuit filed by journalist Chris Hedges, Noam Chomsky, Naomi Wolf and others, US District Judge Katherine B. Forrest ruled in a 68-page opinion that Section 1021 of the NDAA was unconstitutional because it violates the 1st and 5th Amendments. Judge Forrest agreed with the plaintiffs that § 1021(b)(2) of the NDAA was "constitutionally infirm, violating both their free speech and associational rights guaranteed by the First Amendment as well as due process rights guaranteed by the Fifth Amendment of the United States Constitution", also noting that the United States government "did not call any witnesses, submit any documentary evidence or file any declarations" in the case, and that "the government was unwilling or unable to state that these plaintiffs would not be subject to indefinite detention under [Section] 1021", putting them at risk.

Judge Forrest therefore issued a preliminary injunction which prevented the US government from enforcing section 1021 of the NDAA's "Homeland Battlefield" provisions pending further order of the court or an amendment to the statute by US Congress. "There is a strong public interest in protecting rights guaranteed by the First Amendment," Forrest wrote in granting the temporary injunction. "There is also a strong public interest in ensuring that due process rights guaranteed by the Fifth Amendment are protected by ensuring that ordinary citizens are able to understand the scope of conduct that could subject them to indefinite military detention."

Judge Forrest was requested by the Obama administration to undo her ruling. In a footnote of the request, the Administration claimed "The government construes this Court's Order as applying only as to the named plaintiffs in this suit". In an opinion and order filed June 6, 2012, Judge Forrest clarified her statement, saying that her injunction applies not just to the named plaintiffs in the suit, contrary to government's narrow interpretation. She wrote, "Put more bluntly, the May 16 order enjoined enforcement of Section 1021(b)(2) against anyone until further action by this, or a higher, court—or by Congress ... This order should eliminate any doubt as to the May 16 order's scope". The detention provision was not blocked for any persons connected to the September 11 attacks, as Section 1021(b)(1), which essentially restates the scope of the AUMF, was not blocked.

=== U.S. government appeal of preliminary injunction ===
On August 6, 2012, the US Department of Justice (DOJ) filed a notice of appeal with the 2nd U.S. Circuit Court of Appeals seeking to have Judge Forrest's preliminary injunctions vacated. The federal government argued that in cases dealing with "militants" and those offering "substantial support" to them indefinite detention without due process is appropriate. On November 6, 2012, the U.S. government noted that "[g]iven the district court's entry of a permanent injunction, the government's appeal of the preliminary injunction ... is moot".

=== Permanent injunction against enforcement of § 1021(b)(2) of the NDAA ===
A hearing on the plaintiffs' motion for a permanent injunction of the indefinite detention provisions of the NDAA came before Judge Forrest on August 7, 2012.

On September 12, 2012, U.S. District Judge Katherine Forrest granted the plaintiffs' motion for a permanent injunction of § 1021(b)(2) of the National Defense Authorization Act for Fiscal Year 2012 in a 112-page opinion. The permanent injunction issued by Judge Forrest barred the government from relying on the defense authorization law to hold people in indefinite military detention on suspicion that they "substantially supported" Al Qaeda or its allies — at least if they had no connection to the September 11 attacks. Forrest held that the law's definitions of "substantially supported" and "associated forces" were unconstitutionally vague in that a reporter or activist could not be sure they would not be covered under the provision if they worked with a group deemed to be associated with terrorists, or perhaps circulated the message of an associated individual by printing an interview. Forrest acknowledged the importance of the government's efforts to safeguard the country from terrorism, but ruled that the law's broad language violated First Amendment right to free speech, as well as the Fifth Amendment and Fourteenth Amendment right to due process that holds that a person must be able to understand what actions would subject them to penalties.

Forrest wrote: "First Amendment rights are guaranteed by the Constitution and cannot be legislated away. This Court rejects the Government's suggestion that American citizens can be placed in military detention indefinitely, for acts they could not predict might subject them to detention." "When the government was asked by the court what the words 'substantially supported' mean, it was unable to provide a definition; the same was true for 'directly supported'," she wrote in her order, which makes the preliminary injunction permanent. "There can be no doubt, then, these terms are vague." That vagueness does not put citizens on notice, in violation of the due process clause of the Fifth Amendment, she ruled.

A key question throughout these proceedings has been ... precisely what the statute means—what and whose activities it is meant to cover. That is no small question bandied about amongst lawyers and a judge steeped in arcane questions of constitutional law; it is a question of defining an individual's core liberties. The due process rights guaranteed by the Fifth Amendment require that an individual understand what conduct might subject him or her to criminal or civil penalties. Here, the stakes get no higher: indefinite military detention—potential detention during a war on terrorism that is not expected to end in the foreseeable future, if ever. The Constitution requires specificity—and that specificity is absent from Section 1021(b)(2). Understanding the scope of Section 1021(b)(2) requires defining key terms.

Forrest also rejected the US government's position that federal courts should provide habeas corpus, rather than judicial, review to military detainees as "without merit" and "dangerous". The government argued that the issue is not the court's business and that courts could consider individual habeas corpus petitions from prisoners who have been detained. "That argument is without merit and, indeed, dangerous," wrote Judge Forrest. "Habeas petitions (which take years to be resolved following initial detention) are reviewed under a 'preponderance of the evidence' standard (versus the criminal standard of 'beyond a reasonable doubt') by a single judge in a civil proceeding, not a jury of twelve citizens in a criminal proceeding which can only return a guilty verdict if unanimous." "If only habeas review is available to those detained ... even U.S. citizens on U.S. soil, core constitutional rights available in criminal matters would simply be eliminated," she wrote. "No court can accept this proposition and adhere truthfully to its oath."

Forrest refused to "abdicate" her duty to protect constitutional rights out of deference for executive power. "Courts must safeguard core constitutional rights," she wrote.

A long line of Supreme Court precedent adheres to that fundamental principle in unequivocal language. Although it is true that there are scattered cases—primarily decided during World War II—in which the Supreme Court sanctioned undue deference to the executive and legislative branches on constitutional questions, those cases are generally now considered an embarrassment.

The military detentions of Fred Korematsu, in a Japanese internment camp, and Nazi saboteur Richard Quirin, who was executed by a war court, provide two such examples, Forrest said.

The court is mindful of the extraordinary importance of the government's efforts to safeguard the country from terrorism. In light of the high stakes of those efforts as well as the executive branch's expertise, courts undoubtedly owe the political branches a great deal of deference in the area of national security ... Nevertheless, the Constitution places affirmative limits on the power of the Executive to act, and these limits apply in times of peace as well as times of war. Heedlessly to refuse to hear constitutional challenges to the Executive's conduct in the name of deference would be to abdicate this court's responsibility to safeguard the rights it has sworn to uphold.

Forrest declared that the NDAA cannot be used to hold people in indefinite military detention on suspicion of having "substantially supported" al-Qaeda or its allies. "The law of war has never been, and should not be, part of the domestic laws in the United States," she wrote. "The law of war is vague by necessity—it needs flexibility. It is therefore ill-suited to domestic application and it would be ill-advised to make it a part of domestic law." Forrest also argued that in passing the law, Congress had dramatically expanded the categories of people that can be detained. The U.S. government had argued that the NDAA was a reassertion of powers provided by Congress in the 2001 Authorization for Use of Military Force, which targeted perpetrators of the September 11 attacks and those who helped them. Judge Forrest said the new measure was broader, because it covered people beyond those connected to the 9/11 attacks.

In sum Judge Forrest ruled:

For the reasons set forth above, this Court permanently enjoins enforcement of § 1021(b)(2) in any manner, as to any person. The Court invites Congress to examine whether there are amendments that might cure the statute/s deficiencies or whether in light of existing authorization and existing criminal statutes § 1021 is needed at all. This Court has stated its position, as directly presented to it by the Government, that the AUMF and § 1021(b) (2) are not the same; they are not co-extensive. Military detention based on allegations of "substantially supporting" or "directly supporting" the Taliban, al-Qaeda or associated forces, is not encompassed within the AUMF and is enjoined by this Order regarding § 1021(b) (2). No detention based upon § 1021(b) (2) can occur.

In her permanent injunction order Judge Forrest invited Congress to examine whether it needed the NDAA at all, or whether it wanted to fix what she had found to be its "deficiencies". As of December 12, 2012, Congress did not respond.

=== U.S. government appeal and stay of permanent injunction ===
On September 13, 2012, federal prosecutors in Manhattan, acting on behalf of the U.S. government, appealed the judge's permanent injunction. In court papers on September 14, 2012, they also asked the judge to immediately freeze her order until it is taken up by the 2nd U.S. Circuit Court of Appeals in New York. More precisely the U.S. government sought both an immediate temporary stay on Judge Forrest's September 12, 2012 ruling so that the matter can be argued, and a permanent one lasting until higher courts resolve the case.

In their court papers on September 14, 2012 government lawyers said the plaintiffs had no basis to fear being locked up for their activities, and that the judge's order interfered with the president's powers at a time of war. Government attorneys argue that the executive branch is entitled to latitude when it comes to cases of national security and that the law is neither too broad nor overly vague. Judge Forrest's opinion is "unprecedented, and the government has compelling arguments that it should be reversed," prosecutors said. They called the permanent injunction an "extraordinary injunction of worldwide scope". Lawyers for the Obama administration also argued that the United States will be irreparably harmed if it has to abide by a judge's ruling that it can no longer hold terrorism suspects indefinitely without trial in military custody. The government said that the injunction was an "unprecedented" trespass on power of the president and the legislature that by its very nature was doing irreparable harm. They also argued that the injunction places an undue burden on military commanders in a time of war while the plaintiffs had no reasonable fear of ever being detained "in the foreseeable future".

The Court's injunction against application of section 1021 'in any manner, as to any person,' ... combined with its mistaken view that section 1021 goes beyond reaffirming the authority contained in the AUMF, could impose entirely unjustified burdens on military officials worldwide, complicating the ability to carry out an armed conflict authorized by Congress in the public interest ... Given the absence of any risk of impending harm to plaintiffs, the serious injury to the government and the public interest in the invalidation of a statute enacted by public representatives, and the possible effect on an ongoing armed conflict and the Executive's prerogatives in military affairs, a stay is necessary.

Judge Forrest denied on September 14, 2012, the government's request for an immediate stay of her injunction so that § 1021(b)(2) of the NDAA law cannot currently be used and said she would rule on September 19, 2012, on whether to suspend it from then on. At that juncture the U.S. Justice Department said it would not wait until September 19, 2012, and will file emergency papers on September 17, 2012, morning.

The U.S. Department of Justice (DOJ) had asked on September 17, 2012, the U.S. Second Circuit Court of Appeals to place an emergency stay on the permanent injunction made by Judge Forrest on September 12, 2012, so that the U.S. president's power to indefinitely detain without charge people accused of providing substantial support to terrorist groups is reaffirmed immediately. The Justice Department wanted the U.S. Second Circuit Court of Appeals to put the judge's ruling on hold while they challenge her decision on appeal. The DOJ contended that Judge Katherine Forrest's ruling incorrectly interpreted the Authorization for Use of Military Force (AUMF). The Justice Department also said Forrest's decision not only invalidated the NDAA, but went further: rejecting the White House's long-standing interpretation of the President's and the military's authority to detain terror suspects. In a 42-page court filing, the government argued that "the district court expressly invites actions for contempt sanctions if the military exercises detention authority in a manner inconsistent with the court's deeply flawed understanding of the scope of that authority" and that "the order "threatens irreparable harm to national security and the public interest by injecting added burdens and dangerous confusion into the conduct of military operations abroad during an active armed conflict".

== Second Circuit proceedings ==
=== Stay pending appeal ===
On September 17, 2012, the U.S. Department of Justice (DOJ) asked the U.S. Second Circuit Court of Appeals to place a temporary emergency stay on the permanent injunction made by Judge Forrest five days earlier. Judge Raymond Lohier issued a one-page order granting the motion on the same day, staying the permanent injunction in Hedges, pending the Second Circuit's consideration of the government's motion to stay the injunction throughout its appeal and consideration of the government's motion for stay pending appeal by the Second Circuit motions panel w on September 28, 2012.

One day before the September 28, 2012 U.S. Second Circuit Court of Appeals hearing, Hedges asserted in a Reddit question-and-answer session: "I suspect, that U.S. citizens, probably dual nationals, are being held in military detention facilities almost certainly overseas and maybe at home."

Following briefing from the plaintiffs and the government on the motion to stay, the Second Circuit granted the motion to stay the injunction pending resolution on the government's appeal. In the order granting the motion to stay, the court wrote:

First, in its memorandum of law in support of its motion, the government clarifies unequivocally that, 'based on their stated activities,' plaintiffs, 'journalists and activists[,] ... are in no danger whatsoever of ever being captured and detained by the U.S. military.'

Second, on its face, the statute does not affect the existing rights of United States citizens or other individuals arrested in the United States. See NDAA § 1021(e) ('Nothing in this section shall be construed to affect existing law or authorities relating to the detention of United States citizens, lawful resident aliens of the United States, or any other persons who are captured or arrested in the United States.').

Third, the language of the district court's injunction appears to go beyond NDAA § 1021 itself and to limit the government's authority under the Authorization for Use of Military Force ...

The court said it would consider arguments in the case on an expedited basis, and Judges Denny Chin, Raymond Lohier and Christopher Droney set a briefing schedule. Carl Mayer, an attorney for the plaintiffs, said they disagree with the decision to stay the case but that "the appeals court is obviously taking this very seriously."

=== Briefing and oral argument ===
On November 6, 2012, the government filed its opening brief in the Second Circuit. The government argued that the plaintiffs lacked standing because "there is no actual or imminent injury to be redressed," stating that plaintiffs had never been detained and face no threat of detention, and criticized Judge Forrest's interpretation of the term "associated forces," writing: "The term is well understood to cover cobelligerent groups that fight together with al-Qaeda or Taliban forces in the armed conflict against the United States," and it is not and cannot be "read to cover the types of unarmed advocacy organizations involved in this suit." The government also noted that none of the plaintiffs allege having a fear of detention, nor have they offered any evidence of the U.S. military detaining journalists or advocates. The defendants added that there is no precedent for hearing a lawsuit to block the president in advance from conducting an armed conflict using congressionally conferred authority. The government also argued that war authorizations have historically been broad and that section 1021(b)(2) is more specific than other authorizations, therefore it should not be subject to a First Amendment or due process vagueness challenge.

Hedges and the other plaintiffs-appellants filed their appeal brief on December 10, 2012. In an article on December 24, 2012, Hedges opined that unless the courts ruled in his favor, "a gulag state will be cemented into place." He further voiced his opinion, provided that the Second Court of Appeals upholds Judge Forrest's ruling, the case will most likely be before the Supreme Court within weeks.

Oral argument was heard before the Second Circuit on February 6, 2013, The dominating topic at oral argument was press rights. before a three-judge panel composed of Judges Raymond J. Lohier, Lewis A. Kaplan and Amalya Lyle Kearse). At oral argument, U.S. government attorney Robert Loeb argued that journalists had nothing to fear from the NDAA because it represented no change in law since the September 11, 2001 attacks, pointing to NDAA Section 1021(e), which states: "Nothing in this section shall be construed to affect existing law or authorities relating to the detention of United States citizens, lawful resident aliens of the United States, or any other persons who are captured or arrested in the United States." In response to questioning from the court, Loeb stated that independent journalists had no reason to fear detention from the NDAA "and would not be treated as combatants unless there was evidence they were only using journalism as a cover and were in fact members of a designated enemy group." Afran, the lawyer for Hedges and the other plaintiffs, countered that a number of ostensibly protected activities could fall under the NDAA's ill-defined language on "substantial support" for terrorism: "For example, raising money for Guantanamo inmates. Is that substantial support? ... Hosting a webcast with al-Qaida members. Is that substantial support?" He also argued that plaintiffs had legal standing to challenge Section 1021(b)(2) because it interfered with plaintiffs' right to free speech by creating a basis to fear that they might be placed in military detention on the basis of their activities. Loeb argued that plaintiffs had failed to show an "objectively reasonable fear of being placed in long-term detention" and that it was "not reasonable" for independent journalists or activists to expect detention under NDAA, since "we have about a decade of experience, and we have nobody being held for acts of independent journalism."

While the case was pending in the Second Circuit, the Supreme Court ruled on Clapper v. Amnesty International USA in February 2013. The U.S. government filed a letter with the Second Circuit arguing that, like the Clapper plaintiffs, the Hedges plaintiffs could not "establish a present or 'certainly impending' injury-in-fact" because that the NDAA's detention provisions, like the NSA warrantless wiretapping authorization, merely permitted rather than required the government to take a particular action. The government argued that Clapper supported its argument that dismissal of the Hedges suit was required due to lack of standing. The Hedges plaintiffs responded in mid-March 2013, arguing that Clapper had "factual and legal predicates differ dramatically from those in the instant appeal and have only superficial similarities to Hedges," and seeking supplemental briefing and argument. The government responded on April 4, 2013. On April 24, 2013, the Second Circuit denied the Hedges plaintiffs' motion for supplemental briefing and argument on the effect of Clapper.

=== Second Circuit's ruling ===
In a 3–0 ruling issued on July 13, 2013, the U.S. Court of Appeals for the Second Circuit overturned Judge Forrest's ruling striking down Section 1021(b)(2) and lifted the injunction. The court of appeals held that Hedges and the other plaintiffs lacked legal standing to challenge the law. In a 60-page opinion written by U.S. District Judge Lewis A. Kaplan (who sat with the Second Circuit by designation) the court held that Hedges and his American co-plaintiffs lacked standing to challenge the indefinite detention provisions of Section 1021 because a subsection of the section, Section 1021(e), made clear that the statute "simply says nothing about the government's authority to detain citizens." The court held that while Section 1021 could have been drafted more clearly, Section 1021(e) made clear that "with respect to citizens, lawful resident aliens, or individuals captured or arrested in the United States, Section 1021 simply says nothing at all." The court added that section 1021 "does not foreclose the possibility that previous 'existing law' may permit the detention of American citizens," citing as an example Yaser Esam Hamdi, a U.S. citizen detained after allegedly fighting alongside the Taliban in Afghanistan in 2001.

With respect to the non-citizen plaintiffs, such as Birgitta of Iceland and Kai Wargalla of Germany, the court determined that "while Section 1021 does have a real bearing on those who are neither citizens nor lawful resident aliens and who are apprehended abroad," the foreign plaintiffs also "failed to establish standing because they have not shown a sufficient threat that the government will detain them under Section 1021." The court held that "plaintiffs have provided no basis for believing that the government will place Jonsdottir and Wargalla in military detention for their supposed substantial support. In all the circumstances, plaintiffs have not shown a sufficient threat of enforcement to establish standing. Moreover, they cannot "'manufacture standing' based on any present injuries incurred due to their expressed fears." The court "express[ed] no view regarding whether the laws of war inform and limit detention authority under Section 1021(b)(2) or whether such principles would foreclose the detention of individuals like Jonsdottir and Wargalla" and stated: "This issue presents important questions about the scope of the government's detention authority under the AUMF, and we are wary of allowing a preenforcement standing inquiry to become the vehicle by which a court addresses these matters unless it is necessary. Because we conclude that standing is absent in any event, we will assume without deciding that Section 1021(b)(2) covers Jonsdottir and Wargalla in light of their stated activities." The Second Circuit vacated the permanent injunction and remanded the case to the district court for further proceedings consistent with its ruling.

Bruce Afran, a lawyer for Hedges, said the ruling "continues a distressing trend in which American federal courts are refusing to rule in cases where the U.S. government is over-reaching and violating civil liberties." The Manhattan U.S. Attorney's Office, which represents the government in the case, declined to comment.

== U.S. Supreme Court proceedings ==
In December 2012, Hedges and the other plaintiffs in the case filed an "Emergent Application to Vacate Temporary Stay of Permanent Injunction," seeking to vacate the Second Circuit's stay of the permanent injunction. The application was denied by the court in December 2012, and in February 2013.

In September 2013, Hedges announced the plaintiffs would file a petition for a writ of certiorari in the Supreme Court, asking that court to review the Second Circuit's ruling. The U.S. government filed in March 2014 a brief in opposition to the plaintiff's petition for a writ of certiorari. The Supreme Court denied certiorari in an order issued April 28, 2014.

== See also ==
- National Defense Authorization Act for Fiscal Year 2012
- National Defense Authorization Act for Fiscal Year 2013
