= Authorization for Use of Military Force of 2001 =

Law authorizing military action

Authorization for Use of Military Force
- Long title: Joint Resolution to authorize the use of United States Armed Forces against those responsible for the recent attacks launched against the United States
- Acronyms (colloquial): AUMF
- Enacted by: the 107th United States Congress
- Effective: September 18, 2001

Citations
- Public law: Pub. L. 107–40 (text) (PDF)
- Statutes at Large: 115 Stat. 224

Legislative history
- Introduced in the Senate as S.J.Res.23 by Tom Daschle (D–SD) on Sept. 14, 2001; Passed the Senate on Sept. 14, 2001 (98-0); Passed the House as the H.J.Res.64 on Sept. 14, 2001 (420-1); Signed into law by President George W. Bush on Sept. 18, 2001

United States Supreme Court cases
- Hamdan v. Rumsfeld (2006), ACLU v. NSA (2007), Hedges v. Obama (2012)

The Authorization for Use of Military Force (AUMF; Pub. L. 107–40 (text) (PDF), 115 Stat. 224) is a joint resolution of the United States Congress which became law on September 18, 2001, authorizing the use of the United States Armed Forces against those responsible for the September 11 attacks. The authorization granted the president the authority to use all "necessary and appropriate force" against those whom he determined "planned, authorized, committed or aided" the September 11 attacks, or who harbored said persons or groups. The act has been identified by historians and other scholars as having enabled the War on Terror, allowing the US president to unilaterally launch military operations across the world without any congressional oversight or transparency for more than two decades.

In this case, the AUMF grants power to the President to determine both who to target and what actions to take. The AUMF is different from a declaration of war in that the AUMF is a statutory force authorization, limiting the President's use of full military force, which he would otherwise have in a declaration of war. The AUMF was passed by the 107th Congress on September 14, 2001, and signed into law by President George W. Bush on September 18, 2001. President Bush said "you are either with us, or you are with the terrorists" in his joint address to Congress and the American public on September 20, 2001, right after the law was signed. The only representative to vote against the authorization in 2001 was Barbara Lee, who has consistently criticized it since for being a blank check giving the government unlimited powers to wage war without debate.

Since its passage in 2001, U.S. presidents have interpreted their authority under the AUMF to extend beyond al-Qaeda and the Taliban in Afghanistan to apply to numerous other groups as well as other geographic locales, due to the act's omission of any specific area of operations. The adoption of this law does not require the targets to be state actors, but can include non-state actors, such as individual persons. Between 2001 and 2026, US forces initiated what it labelled "counter-terror" activities in more than 100 countries. Of these, the 2001 AUMF has been used to launch classified military campaigns in at least 22 countries, most notably in Afghanistan, the Philippines, Georgia, Yemen, Djibouti, Kenya, Ethiopia, Eritrea, Iraq, and Somalia. In December 2016, the Office of the President published a brief interpreting the AUMF as providing congressional authorization for the use of force against al-Qaeda and other militant groups. Today, the full list of actors the U.S. military is fighting or believes itself authorized to fight under the 2001 AUMF is classified.

== Text of the AUMF ==
Preamble

Joint Resolution

To authorize the use of United States Armed Forces against those responsible for the recent attacks launched against the United States.

Whereas, on September 11, 2001, acts of treacherous violence were committed against the United States and its citizens; and

Whereas, such acts render it both necessary and appropriate that the United States exercise its rights to self-defense and to protect United States citizens both at home and abroad; and

Whereas, in light of the threat to the national security and foreign policy of the United States posed by these grave acts of violence; and

Whereas, such acts continue to pose an unusual and extraordinary threat to the national security and foreign policy of the United States; and

Whereas, the President has authority under the Constitution to take action to deter and prevent acts of international terrorism against the United States: Now, therefore, be it

Resolved by the Senate and House of Representatives of the United States of America in Congress assembled,

Section 1 – Short Title

This joint resolution may be cited as the 'Authorization for Use of Military Force'.

Section 2 – Authorization For Use of United States Armed Forces

(a) IN GENERAL- That the President is authorized to use all necessary and appropriate force against those nations, organizations, or persons he determines planned, authorized, committed, or aided the terrorist attacks that occurred on September 11, 2001, or harbored such organizations or persons, in order to prevent any future acts of international terrorism against the United States by such nations, organizations or persons.

(b) War Powers Resolution Requirements-

(1) SPECIFIC STATUTORY AUTHORIZATION- Consistent with section 8(a)(1) of the War Powers Resolution, the Congress declares that this section is intended to constitute specific statutory authorization within the meaning of section 5(b) of the War Powers Resolution.

(2) APPLICABILITY OF OTHER REQUIREMENTS- Nothing in this resolution supersedes any requirement of the War Powers Resolution.

Speaker of the House of Representatives.

Vice President of the United States and

President of the Senate.

== Congressional votes ==
An initial draft of Senate Joint Resolution 23 included language granting the power "to deter and preempt any future acts of terrorism or aggression against the United States." Members were concerned that this would provide "a blank check to go anywhere, anytime, against anyone the Bush administration or any subsequent administration deemed capable of carrying out an attack" and the language was removed.

=== Senate ===
On September 14, 2001, Senate Joint Resolution 23 passed in the Senate by roll call vote. The totals in the Senate were: 98 Ayes, 0 Nays, 2 Present/Not Voting (Senators Larry Craig, R-ID, and Jesse Helms, R-NC).

=== House of Representatives ===
On September 14, 2001, the House passed House Joint Resolution 64. The totals in the House of Representatives were 420 ayes, 1 nay and 10 not voting (Heather Wilson, Jim Saxton, Loretta Sanchez, Tom Petri, Bill Lipinski, Peter King, Carolyn Cheeks Kilpatrick, Sam Farr, John Conyers, Cass Ballenger).

The sole nay vote was by Barbara Lee, D-CA. Lee was the only member of either house of Congress to vote against the bill. Lee opposed the wording of the AUMF, not the action it represented. She believed that a response was necessary but feared the vagueness of the document was similar to the 1964 Gulf of Tonkin Resolution. Lee initiated several attempts to repeal the authorization before she left the House at end of the 118th Congress following an unsuccessful Senate bid.

== History ==
=== Bush administration ===
The AUMF was unsuccessfully cited by the George W. Bush administration in Hamdan v. Rumsfeld (2006), in which the U.S. Supreme Court ruled that the administration's military commissions at Guantanamo Bay were not competent tribunals as constituted and thus illegal. The court held that President George W. Bush did not have the authority to set up the war crimes tribunals and finding the special military commissions illegal under both military justice law and the Geneva Conventions.

In 2007, the AUMF was cited by the Department of Justice in ACLU v. NSA as authority for engaging in electronic surveillance without obtaining a warrant of the special court as required by the Constitution.

=== Obama administration ===
In 2012, journalists and activists brought a suit (Hedges v. Obama) against the National Defense Authorization Act for Fiscal Year 2012, in which Congress "affirms" presidential authority for indefinite detention under the AUMF and makes specific provisions as to the exercise of that authority.

In 2016, constitutional law specialist professor Bruce Ackerman of Yale Law School said that the Obama administration's use of the AUMF to that point had overstepped the authorized powers of the final, enacted version of the bill so as to more closely resemble the capabilities named in this draft text rejected by Congress.

=== First Trump administration ===
On June 29, 2017, a group of libertarian Republicans and Democrats on the House Appropriations Committee approved Barbara Lee's amendment to end the 2001 authorization within 240 days. This would have forced debate on a replacement authorization, but the amendment was removed from the bill by the Rules Committee, and the AUMF remained in effect.

In 2018, Senators Tim Kaine and Bob Corker proposed several updates to the AUMF.

In November 2019, the AUMF was supposed to be grounds for the occupation of Kurdish-controlled Syrian oilfields, as the Trump administration sought legal authorization to maintain a presence in the area.

=== Biden administration ===
General Mark Miley, as chairman of the Joint Chiefs of Staff, testified in June 2021 that "2001 AUMF is the one we need to hang on to…it is the critical one for us to continue operations".

After the Biden administration conducted airstrikes in Somalia to support the Danab Brigade against al-Shabab militants, Democratic Senator Ben Cardin, a senior member of the Senate Foreign Relations Committee, said that "What the Biden team is doing is consistent with what we've seen now in three prior administrations, but it's, to me, inconsistent with the intent of Congress" and called on the administration to "submit a new authorization for the use of military force". Some Republicans supported the strikes, with Senator Marco Rubio, vice-chair of the Senate Intelligence Committee, saying "I don't think the president needs a law passed by Congress in order to target terrorists who are posing a threat to the United States, no matter where they are in the world".

=== Second Trump administration ===
The 2001 AUMF was used as a justification for the 2025 United States strikes on Venezuelan boats. Amid criticism that drug smuggling is neither a form of terrorism nor an armed attack, the Trump administration deported survivors of one attack to other countries to avoid court challenges to continued detention without evidence or the legal justification for the action.

== Use by the US government ==
The AUMF has also been cited by a wide variety of US officials as justification for continuing military actions all over the world. Often the phrase "Al-Qaeda and associated forces" has been used by these officials. However, that phrase does not appear in the AUMF, but is instead an interpretation of the 2001 AUMF by presidents Bush, Obama, and Trump. The US government has formally used the term in litigation, including a March 2009 Department of Justice brief as well as the 2012 National Defense Authorization Act.

According to a report by the Congressional Research Service published May 11, 2016, at that time the 2001 AUMF had been cited 37 times in connection with actions in 14 countries and on the high seas. The report stated that "Of the 37 occurrences, 18 were made during the Bush Administration, and 19 have been made during the Obama Administration." The countries that were mentioned in the report included Afghanistan, Cuba (Guantanamo Bay), Djibouti, Eritrea, Ethiopia, Georgia, Iraq, Kenya, Libya, the Philippines, Somalia, Syria and Yemen.

An updated CRS report, published February 16, 2018, documented two additional citations of the AUMF by the Obama administration and two citations of the AUMF by the Trump administration.

== Efforts for repeal ==
The 2001 AUMF has been widely perceived as a bill that grants the president powers to unilaterally wage perpetual "worldwide wars". Both Republican and Democratic senators have led calls to repeal the AUMF, especially after the Biden administration's escalation of military campaigns in Somalia since 2021.

Senator Chris Murphy criticized the Biden administration's unilateral strikes as setting a "very dangerous precedent", urging Biden to first seek separate congressional authorization rather than using the AUMF. Republican Senators Rand Paul (whose father, Ron Paul, voted for it), Mike Lee, Mike Braun and JD Vance introduced the "End Endless Wars Act" Bill in June 2023, seeking the repeal of the 2001 AUMF. According to Rand Paul, the 2001 AUMF has been used to justify a "worldwide war, all the time, everywhere, forever." Mike Braun criticized the 2001 AUMF for authorizing US presidents to unilaterally wage foreign wars without any consultation with the American public.

== See also ==
- The Authorization for Use of Military Force Against Iraq Resolution of 2002
- Hedges v. Obama
- National Defense Authorization Act for Fiscal Year 2012
- War on terror
- Targeted killing
- The US Patriot Act (2001) and Title II of the Patriot Act, entitled Enhanced Surveillance Procedures
- Operation Enduring Freedom
- War Powers Clause, United States Constitution Art. 1, Sect. 8, Clause 11, which vests in the Congress the exclusive power to declare war.
