= Enemy Expatriation Act =

Proposed law in the United States

The Enemy Expatriation Act (H.R. 3166 and S. 1698) was a law proposed in the 112th United States Congress sponsored by Senators Joe Lieberman (I-CT) and Scott Brown (R-MA) and Representatives Charlie Dent (R-PA) and Jason Altmire (D-PA). The bill would allow the United States government to strip US citizens of their citizenship if they participate in terrorism, defined as "providing material support or resources to a Foreign Terrorist Organization, as designated by the Secretary of State, or actively engaging in hostilities against the United States or its allies." In early 2012, the proposal was compared to the recently passed National Defense Authorization Act, and some writers have suggested that the two laws could be used together to take away citizens' civil liberties. The bill proposed to add to the circumstances under which US citizenship can be lost.

== See also ==
- Anwar al-Awlaki
- War on terror
