= Death of the Liberal Class =

2010 book by Chris Hedges

- First edition
- Author: Chris Hedges
- Publisher: Nation Books
- Publication date: 2010
- Media type: Print
- Pages: 256
- ISBN: 978-1-56858-644-1

Death of the Liberal Class is a 2010 book by the American journalist Chris Hedges. Hedges writes on left-wing politics in the United States, and asserts the decline of a privileged and increasingly ineffectual "liberal class" due to corporate political dominance.

== Contents ==
=== I - Resistance ===
Death of the Liberal Class begins with a sympathetic profile of an impoverished Libertarian Party activist, Ernest Logan Bell. Bell articulates a plethora of injustices related to widespread corporate dominance of American life, and mixes left- and right-wing positions in his criticism of liberal politicians. Hedges then discusses how Bell and the interests of many working Americans like him have been abandoned by a liberal class that championed deindustrialization, financial deregulation, and unmitigated outsourcing. The liberal class is described as a body of people employed in privileged, largely managerial positions in liberal institutions; including churches, media, the Democratic Party, labor unions, and academia. Hedges argues that political theater and moral posturing has replaced meaningful agitation for reform, and charges that the liberal class has turned into a class of apologists for the corporate interests that killed them.

=== II - Permanent War ===
The second chapter posits that one of the core weaknesses in the power of the liberal class is its history of supporting war efforts in the United States. Nationalist narratives in wartime tend to dominate public discourse and mute interest in social reform. This pervasive war footing creates a near-totalitarian influence in media to service national myth. This complacency concedes power to an aggressive right wing. Hedges praises the authorship, political activism, and media criticism of Noam Chomsky. Hedges then contrasts the acceptance of pro-war liberal figures following the 2003 United States invasion of Iraq with the widespread denunciations of Michael Moore for criticizing the war while accepting an Oscar in 2003. The use of mercenary forces such as Blackwater is discussed, along with other forms of war profiteering in the United States defense industry. Hedges then outlines the ignored grievances of members in the armed forces that foretold American defeat in the War in Afghanistan. Hedges alleges that the American efforts in Afghanistan were primed for failure due to the neglect of resolving Afghan poverty, food shortages, and social issues that combined to form popular sympathy for the Taliban. Hedges concludes the chapter covering the social abandonment of wounded veterans and other people destroyed by violent conflict.

=== III - Dismantling the Liberal Class ===
Hedges places the beginning of widespread institutional decay of the liberal class near its inception during World War I with the founding of the Committee on Public Information headed by George Creel, which effectively killed the populist pacifism movement through war propaganda. The CPI's state-sanctioned propaganda demonized peace activists and social radicals. The liberal class was broadly complicit in furthering the war frenzy, and CPI propaganda was published in thousands of newspapers across the United States. Former employees and volunteers in the CPI went on to employ similar propaganda tactics in the private sector, effectively spurring the rise of corporate marketing. Hedges then discusses the Federal Theatre Project and the radical messaging of plays such as The Cradle Will Rock. The FTP was eventually ended, despite its popular support, due to mounting pressures from business interests and a successful defunding effort from House Un-American Activities Committee members. Hedges argues that this attack by corporate interests on the radical theater led to self-censorship within the arts, and that the liberal class further betrayed the voices of American workers by supporting anti-union legislation like the Taft-Hartley Act.

=== IV - Politics as Spectacle ===
The fourth chapter begins with a criticism the counterculture of the 1960s for failing to engage with the interests of the American working class. Hedges accuses the New Left of that era of being morally vacuous for preferring hedonism over solidarity, and disparages the rise of abstract art that avoided class-conscious political messaging. This move towards abstraction and spectacle is alleged to be part of a corporate seizure of the arts that coincides with corporate domination of other public-facing media. Hedges briefly discusses his own conflict with his former employer, The New York Times, for his public opposition to the 2003 United States invasion of Iraq. He then further argues that American journalism, despite its merits, is a corrupted pillar of the liberal class that has been repurposed to serve the narrow interests of corporations under the guise of objectivity.

=== V - Liberal Defectors ===
The following chapter serves as an acknowledgement of the many prominent individuals who have pushed for liberal reforms despite abandonment by institutional liberal forces. Hedges alleges many in the liberal class have sacrificed their moral consciences in the pursuit of career interests, through placating the economic elite. Hedges praises the reporter Sydney Schanberg, who was celebrated in his coverage of the Cambodian genocide. When Schanberg returned to the United States to report on New York City metropolitan issues for The New York Times, he was vehemently disparaged and eventually demoted by then executive editor A. M. Rosenthal for his reporting on corruption and abuses by prominent New York City real estate developers. Hedges additionally profiles the personal and career attacks made against Richard Goldstone and Norman Finkelstein for their public recognition of Israeli war crimes. Hedges contrasts the treatment of disparaged critics within the liberal class against the inaction and general acceptance of mediocrity in the face of a plethora of crises impacting the American working class. Hedges then praises many other voices of dissent within the liberal class such as Dorothy Day, I. F. Stone, Edward Herman, Noam Chomsky, Howard Zinn, and Ralph Nader. Hedges notes that Zinn was the target of surveillance by the Federal Bureau of Investigation and that Nader's activism was barred from being reported in the Times due to the actions of Rosenthal. There is an additional mention of the radical activism of Dr. Martin Luther King Jr. that was whitewashed in media in an effort to make King a revered figure of American liberalism. The chapter is concluded by covering the friendship and admiration held by former United States president Barack Obama towards the aggressively anti-union CEO of FedEx, Frederick Smith.

=== VI - Rebellion ===
The end of the book discusses Hedges' preferred means of resisting the devastation wrought by unchecked global capitalism. The liberal class, reduced to a vestigial appendage within the halls of power, is argued to be helpless in agitating for reforms as it had in the past. Hedges fixates on the ecological costs associated with modern capitalism, and points to the liberal class' continued faith in progress despite mounting environmental and economic crises as evidence of their naivety and incompetence. Hedges expresses a fear that violence may become a justifiable means of resistance due to the perceived potential for inverted or classical totalitarianism in the United States. He additionally expects a future collapse of global civilization due to accelerated climate change, along with some potential for human extinction. Hedges cites the potential for positive feedback loops for greenhouse gas emissions such as Arctic methane emissions, along with the failures of Barack Obama and other world leaders in accomplishing any meaningful climate progress at the 2009 United Nations Climate Change Conference. Hedges argues for stronger community organizing, but personally expects successful resistance to be unlikely. Hedges decries the collapse of literacy in the United States, and claims that the Internet may worsen functional illiteracy and destroy social connection through cyberbalkanization. He calls for people to defy the arbitrary constraints of the dead liberal class and seek new ways to disrupt corporate power. Hedges concludes that rebellion is a moral obligation no matter the costs that may be administered for defiance.

== Reception ==
Death of the Liberal Class generally received mixed reviews.

In a Harvard Political Review piece by Caroline Cox, the book is described as "at once engaging and wildly excessive." Many arguments in the book were considered "hyperbolic," but Cox praised Hedges' analysis of journalism as "the highlight of his book." Despite reservations regarding Hedges' tendency towards "apocalyptic predictions," Cox concluded that "Death of the Liberal Class is a book all liberals should read to reassess their own role in American democracy."

A review by historian Samuel Farber in Socialist Worker was mixed. Farber called Death of the Liberal Class a "well-written and hard-hitting book" and praised Hedges' analysis of the media, journalism, and the Committee on Public Information. Farber criticized the "confusing and unconvincing" coverage of American class relations, and claimed that Hedges fundamentally underestimates the potential for successful popular resistance around the world.

The book was featured in an NPR segment, had a brief positive review in Publishers Weekly, and a short negative review in The New Yorker.

Obey, a 2013 documentary by British filmmaker Temujin Doran, is based on Death of the Liberal Class. The book also inspired a poorly received 2016 off-Broadway stage production with the same name written by Robert Lyons.

== See also ==
- Notes from Underground
