= American Dream =

National ethos of the United States

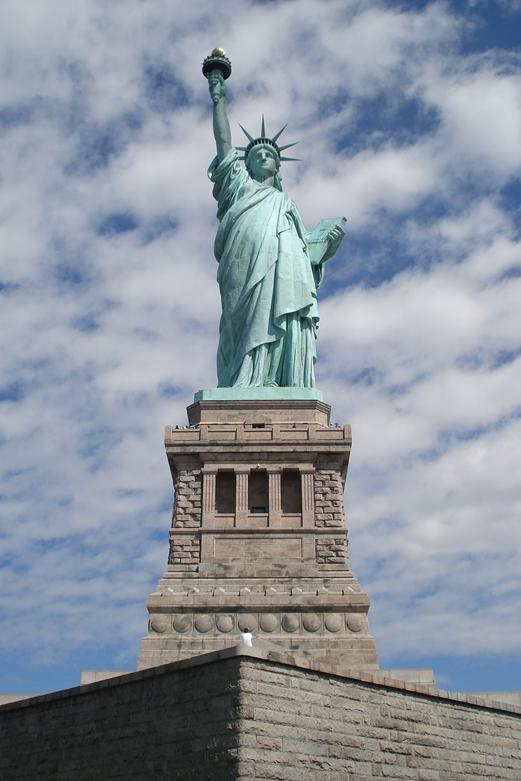
Liberty Enlightening the World (the Statue of Liberty) in the New York Harbor was the first view of the United States for many immigrants during the mid-19th to the early 20th century. In this role, it signified new opportunities for becoming American, and evolved into a symbol of the American Dream.

The "American Dream" is a phrase referring to the national ethos of the United States: that every person has the freedom and opportunity to succeed and attain a better life. The tenets of the American Dream originate from the Declaration of Independence, which states "all men are created equal", and have an inalienable right to "life, liberty, and the pursuit of happiness". The Preamble to the Constitution states similarly that the Constitution's purpose is to, in part, "secure the Blessings of Liberty to ourselves and our Posterity". (Note: "Posterity" is a now-archaic term referring to one's descendants.)

The phrase was coined by James Truslow Adams during the Great Depression in 1931; Adams defines it as

that dream of a land in which life should be better and richer and fuller for everyone, with opportunity for each according to ability or achievement. [...] It is not a dream of motor cars and high wages merely, but a dream of social order in which each man and each woman shall be able to attain to the fullest stature of which they are innately capable, and be recognized by others for what they are, regardless of the fortuitous circumstances of birth or position.

However, the term has evolved over time to have different connotations. Originally, the emphasis was on democracy, liberty, and equality, but more recently has been on achieving success, which is typically exemplified by attaining material wealth as well as upward social mobility.

There is some evidence that in recent decades, social mobility in the United States has declined and income inequality has risen. Social mobility is lower in the US than in many European countries, especially Nordic countries. Despite this, many Americans are likely to believe they have a better chance of social mobility than that of Europeans. However, recent empirical research on public opinion has found that belief in the "American Dream" has significantly declined, decreasing most sharply among young adults.

Some critics have said that the dominant culture in America focuses on materialism and consumerism, or puts blame on the individual for failing to achieve success. Others have said that the labor movement is significant for delivering on the American Dream and building the middle class, yet in 2024 only 10% of American workers were members of a labor union, down from 20% in 1983. The American Dream has also been said to be tied to American exceptionalism and does not acknowledge the hardships many Americans have faced in regards to American slavery, Native American genocide, their legacies, and other examples of discriminatory violence.

== History ==
The meaning of the American Dream has changed over the course of history, and includes both personal components such as home ownership and upward mobility as well as a global vision for cultural hegemony and diplomacy.

=== 18th century ===
The American Dream originated in colonial mystique regarding frontier life. As John Murray, 4th Earl of Dunmore, the colonial Governor of Virginia, notes in 1774, the Americans "for ever imagine the Lands further off are still better than those upon which they are already settled". He adds "if they attained Paradise, they would move on if they heard of a better place farther west".

The 18th century provided Americans with new sources of wealth and new means of travel. When looking at immigration in history, it is important to consider the different experiences with respect to gender and race. Often, tensions between economic and political agendas come into play. After 1776, the United States became a significant part of the global economy. This paragraph highlights the complex relationships between global integration and American history:

These complicated transnational networks themselves are not the only story. Along with global integration went attempts to assert national distinctiveness amid growing global competition. Americans conceived of and responded to these pressures by striving to create national economic independence because they wanted to maintain political and social independence. Thus there was tension between the economic imperatives of global integration, and national political debates and economic agendas - such as the enhancement of national security through a strong industrial and financial base.

=== 19th century ===
Many well-educated Germans who fled the failed 1848 revolution found the United States more politically free than their homeland, which they believed to be a hierarchical and aristocratic society that determined the ceiling for their aspirations. One of them said:

The German emigrant comes into a country free from the despotism, privileged orders and monopolies, intolerable taxes, and constraints in matters of belief and conscience. Everyone can travel and settle wherever he pleases. No passport is demanded, no police mingles in his affairs or hinders his movements ... Fidelity and merit are the only sources of honor here. The rich stand on the same footing as the poor; the scholar is not a mug above the most humble mechanics; no German ought to be ashamed to pursue any occupation ... [In America] wealth and possession of real estate confer not the least political right on its owner above what the poorest citizen has. Nor are there nobility, privileged orders, or standing armies to weaken the physical and moral power of the people, nor are there swarms of public functionaries to devour in idleness credit for. Above all, there are no princes and corrupt courts representing the so-called divine 'right of birth'. In such a country the talents, energy and perseverance of a person ... have far greater opportunity to display than in monarchies.

The discovery of gold in California in 1849 brought in a hundred thousand men looking for their fortune overnight—and a few did find it. Thus was born the California Dream of instant success. Historian H. W. Brands notes that in the years after the Gold Rush, the California Dream spread across the nation:

The old American Dream ... was the dream of the Puritans, of Benjamin Franklin's "Poor Richard"... of men and women content to accumulate their modest fortunes a little at a time, year by year by year. The new dream was the dream of instant wealth, won in a twinkling by audacity and good luck. [This] golden dream ... became a prominent part of the American psyche only after Sutter's Mill.

Historian Frederick Jackson Turner in 1893 advanced the Frontier Thesis, under which American democracy and the American Dream were formed by the American frontier. He stressed the process—the moving frontier line—and the impact it had on pioneers going through the process. He also stressed results; especially that American democracy was the primary result, along with egalitarianism, a lack of interest in high culture, and violence. "American democracy was born of no theorist's dream; it was not carried in the Susan Constant to Virginia, nor in the Mayflower to Plymouth. It came out of the American forest, and it gained new strength each time it touched a new frontier," said Turner.

In Turner's thesis, the American frontier established liberty by releasing Americans from European mindsets and eroding old, dysfunctional customs. The frontier had no need for standing armies, established churches, aristocrats or nobles, nor for landed gentry who controlled most of the land and charged heavy rents. Frontier land was free for the taking. Turner first announced his thesis in a paper entitled "The Significance of the Frontier in American History", delivered to the American Historical Association in 1893 in Chicago. He won wide acclaim among historians and intellectuals. Turner elaborated on the theme in his advanced history lectures and in a series of essays published over the next 25 years, published along with his initial paper as The Frontier in American History. Turner's emphasis on the importance of the frontier in shaping American character influenced the interpretation found in thousands of scholarly histories. By the time Turner died in 1932, 60% of the leading history departments in the U.S. were teaching courses in frontier history along Turnerian lines.

Americanization of California (1932) by Dean Cornwell

=== 20th century ===
From out of the darkest years of the Great Depression, freelance writer James Truslow Adams popularized the phrase "American Dream" in his 1931 book Epic of America:

But there has been also the American dream, that dream of a land in which life should be better and richer and fuller for every man, with opportunity for each according to his ability or achievement. It is a difficult dream for the European upper classes to interpret adequately, and too many of us ourselves have grown weary and mistrustful of it. It is not a dream of motor cars and high wages merely, but a dream of social order in which each man and each woman shall be able to attain to the fullest stature of which they are innately capable, and be recognized by others for what they are, regardless of the fortuitous circumstances of birth or position... The American dream, that has lured tens of millions of all nations to our shores in the past century has not been a dream of merely material plenty, though that has doubtlessly counted heavily. It has been much more than that. It has been a dream of being able to grow to fullest development as man and woman, unhampered by the barriers which had slowly been erected in the older civilizations, unrepressed by social orders which had developed for the benefit of classes rather than for the simple human being of any and every class.

Adams contends that extreme wealth inequality was among the worst enemies of the American Dream and states:

So long also as we are ourselves content with a mere extension of the material basis of existence, with the multiplying of our material possessions, it is absurd to think that the men who can utilize that public attitude for the gaining of infinite wealth and power for themselves will abandon both to become spiritual leaders of a democracy that despises spiritual things.

He states that the American institution that best exemplifies the American dream is the Library of Congress; he contrasts it with European libraries of the time, which restricts access to many of their works, and he argues that the Library, as an institution funded by and meant to uphold democracy, is an example of democratic government's ability to uplift and equalize the people that it rules over and is ruled by in order to "save itself" from a takeover by oligarchic forces. In Adams' view the Library offers an opportunity for the whole nation to come together in thoughtful pursuit of a common good, which he claims needs to be "carried out in all departments of our national life" in order to make the American Dream a reality.

Martin Luther King Jr., in his "Letter from a Birmingham Jail" (1963), roots the civil rights movement in the African-American quest for the American Dream:

We will win our freedom because the sacred heritage of our nation and the eternal will of God are embodied in our echoing demands ... when these disinherited children of God sat down at lunch counters they were in reality standing up for what is best in the American dream and for the most sacred values in our Judeo-Christian heritage, thereby bringing our nation back to those great wells of democracy which were dug deep by the Founding Fathers in their formulation of the Constitution and the Declaration of Independence.

== Literature ==
The concept of the American Dream has been used in popular discourse, and scholars have traced its use in American literature ranging from the Autobiography of Benjamin Franklin to Mark Twain's Adventures of Huckleberry Finn (1884), Willa Cather's My Ántonia, F. Scott Fitzgerald's The Great Gatsby (1925), Theodore Dreiser's An American Tragedy (1925) and Toni Morrison's Song of Solomon (1977). Other writers who use the American Dream theme include Hunter S. Thompson, Edward Albee, John Steinbeck, Langston Hughes, and Giannina Braschi.

In 2006, Dr. Guiyou Huang from St. Thomas University in Florida wrote a paper regarding the American Dream as a recurring theme in the fiction of Asian Americans.

=== American ideals ===
Many American authors added American ideals to their work as a theme or other reoccurring idea, to get their point across. There are many ideals that appear in American literature such as that all people are equal, the United States is the land of opportunity, independence is valued, the American Dream is attainable, and everyone can succeed with hard work and determination. John Winthrop also writes about this term called American exceptionalism. This ideology refers to the idea that Americans are, as a nation, elect.

=== Literary commentary ===
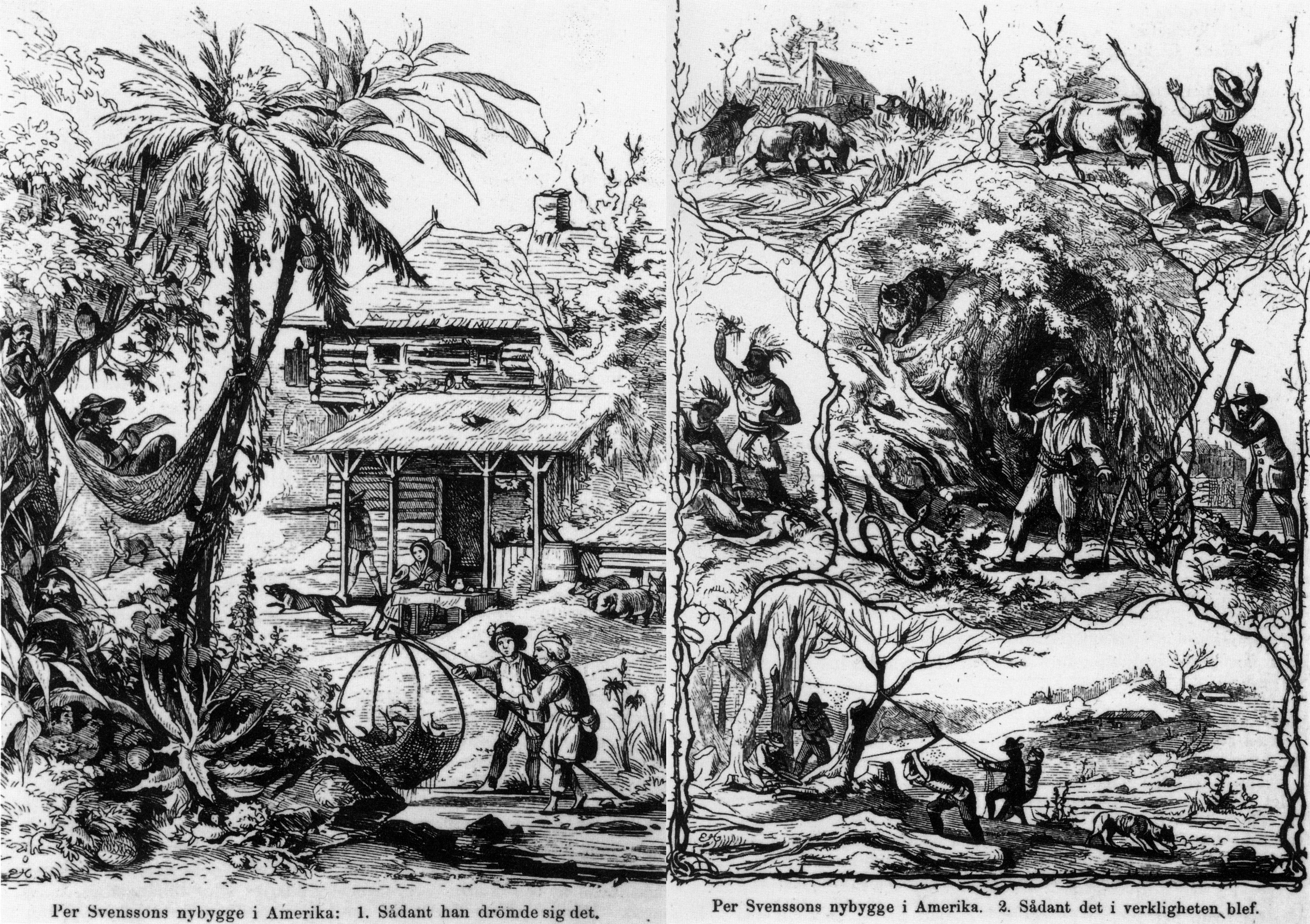
European governments, worried that their best young people would leave for America, distributed posters like this to frighten them (this 1869 Swedish anti-emigration poster contrasts Per Svensson's dream of the American idyll (left) and the reality of his life in the wilderness (right), where he is menaced by a mountain lion, a big snake and wild Indians who are scalping and disembowelling someone).

The American Dream has been credited with helping to build a cohesive American experience but has also been blamed for inflated expectations. Some commentators note that despite deep-seated belief in the egalitarian American Dream, the modern American wealth structure still perpetuates racial and class inequalities between generations. One sociologist notes that advantage and disadvantage are not always connected to individual successes or failures, but often to prior position in a social group.

Since the 1920s, numerous authors—such as Sinclair Lewis in his 1922 novel Babbitt, and F. Scott Fitzgerald, in his 1925 classic, The Great Gatsby—satirize or ridicule materialism in the chase for the American dream. For example, Jay Gatsby's death mirrors the American Dream's demise, reflecting the pessimism of modern-day Americans. The American Dream is a main theme in the book by John Steinbeck, Of Mice and Men. The two friends George and Lennie dream of their own piece of land with a ranch, so they can "live off the fatta the lan'" and just enjoy a better life. The book later shows that not everyone can achieve the American Dream, although it is possible to achieve for a few. A lot of people follow the American Dream to achieve a greater chance of becoming rich. Some posit that the ease of achieving the American Dream changes with technological advances, availability of infrastructure and information, government regulations, state of the economy, and with the evolving cultural values of American demographics.

In 1949, Arthur Miller wrote Death of a Salesman, in which the American Dream is a fruitless pursuit. Similarly, in 1971 Hunter S. Thompson depicts in Fear and Loathing in Las Vegas: A Savage Journey Into the Heart of the American Dream a dark psychedelic reflection of the concept—successfully illustrated only in wasted pop-culture excess.

The novel Requiem for a Dream by Hubert Selby Jr. is an exploration of the pursuit of American success as it turns delirious and lethal, told through the ensuing tailspin of its main characters. George Carlin famously wrote the joke "it's called the American dream because you have to be asleep to believe it". Carlin points to "the big wealthy business interests that control things and make all the important decisions" as having a greater influence than an individual's choice. Pulitzer Prize-winning journalist and leftist activist Chris Hedges echoes this sentiment in his 2012 book Days of Destruction, Days of Revolt:

The vaunted American dream, the idea that life will get better, that progress is inevitable if we obey the rules and work hard, that material prosperity is assured, has been replaced by a hard and bitter truth. The American dream, we now know, is a lie. We will all be sacrificed. The virus of corporate abuse—the perverted belief that only corporate profit matters—has spread to outsource our jobs, cut the budgets of our schools, close our libraries, and plague our communities with foreclosures and unemployment.

The American Dream, and the sometimes dark response to it, has been a long-standing theme in American film. Many counterculture films of the 1960s and 1970s ridiculed the traditional quest for the American Dream. For example, Easy Rider (1969), directed by Dennis Hopper, shows the characters making a pilgrimage in search of "the true America" in terms of the hippie movement, drug use, and communal lifestyles.

== Political leaders ==
Scholars have explored the American Dream theme in the careers of numerous political leaders, including Henry Kissinger, Hillary Clinton, Benjamin Franklin, and Abraham Lincoln. The theme has been used for many local leaders as well, such as 19th century Tejano leader José Antonio Navarro, who served in the legislatures of Coahuila y Texas, the Republic of Texas, and the state of Texas.

In 2006, U.S. Senator Barack Obama wrote a memoir, The Audacity of Hope: Thoughts on Reclaiming the American Dream. It was this interpretation of the American Dream for a young black man that helped establish his statewide and national reputations. The exact meaning of the Dream became a minor partisan political issue in the 2008 and 2012 elections.

Political conflicts, to some degree, have been ameliorated by the shared values of all parties in the expectation that the American Dream will resolve many difficulties and conflicts.

== Public opinion ==
The ethos today implies an opportunity for Americans to achieve prosperity through hard work. According to the Dream, this includes the opportunity for one's children to grow up and receive a good education and career without artificial barriers. It is the opportunity to make individual choices without the prior restrictions that limited people according to their class, caste, religion, race, or ethnicity. Immigrants to the United States sponsored ethnic newspapers in their own language; the editors typically promoted the American Dream. Lawrence Samuel argues:

For many in both the working class and the middle class, upward mobility has served as the heart and soul of the American Dream, the prospect of "betterment" and to "improve one's lot" for oneself and one's children much of what this country is all about. "Work hard, save a little, send the kids to college so they can do better than you did, and retire happily to a warmer climate" has been the script we have all been handed.

A key element of the American Dream is promoting opportunity for one's children, Johnson interviewing parents says, "This was one of the most salient features of the interview data: parents—regardless of background—relied heavily on the American Dream to understand the possibilities for children, especially their own children". Rank et al. argue, "The hopes and optimism that Americans possess pertain not only to their own lives, but to their children's lives as well. A fundamental aspect of the American Dream has always been the expectation that the next generation should do better than the previous generation."

A lot of Americans think the U.S. has more social mobility than other western industrialized countries. This [study using medians instead of averages] makes it abundantly clear that we have less. Your circumstances at birth—specifically, what your parents do for a living—are an even bigger factor in how far you get in life than we had previously realized. Generations of Americans considered the United States to be a land of opportunity. This research raises some sobering questions about that image.

— Michael Hout, Professor of Sociology at New York University, 2018

Hanson and Zogby (2010) report on numerous public opinion polls that since the 1980s have explored the meaning of the concept for Americans, and their expectations for its future. In these polls, a majority of Americans consistently reported that for their family, the American Dream is more about spiritual happiness than material goods. Majorities state that working hard is the most important element for getting ahead. However, an increasing minority stated that hard work and determination does not guarantee success.

In 2010, most Americans predicted that achieving the Dream with fair means would become increasingly difficult for future generations. They were increasingly pessimistic about the opportunity for the working class to get ahead; on the other hand, they were increasingly optimistic about the opportunities available to poor people and to new immigrants. Furthermore, most supported programs to make special efforts to help minorities get ahead.

In a 2013 poll by YouGov, 41% of responders said it is impossible for most to achieve the American Dream, while 38% said it is still possible. Most Americans perceive a college education as the ticket to the American Dream. Some recent observers warn that soaring student loan debt crisis and shortages of good jobs may undermine this ticket. The point is illustrated in The Fallen American Dream, a documentary film that details the concept of the American Dream from its historical origins to its current perception. A 2020 poll found 54% of American adults thought the American Dream was attainable for them, 28% believed it was not, and 9% rejected the idea of the American Dream entirely. Younger generations were less likely to believe this than their older counterparts, and black and Asian Americans less likely than whites, Hispanics and Native Americans.

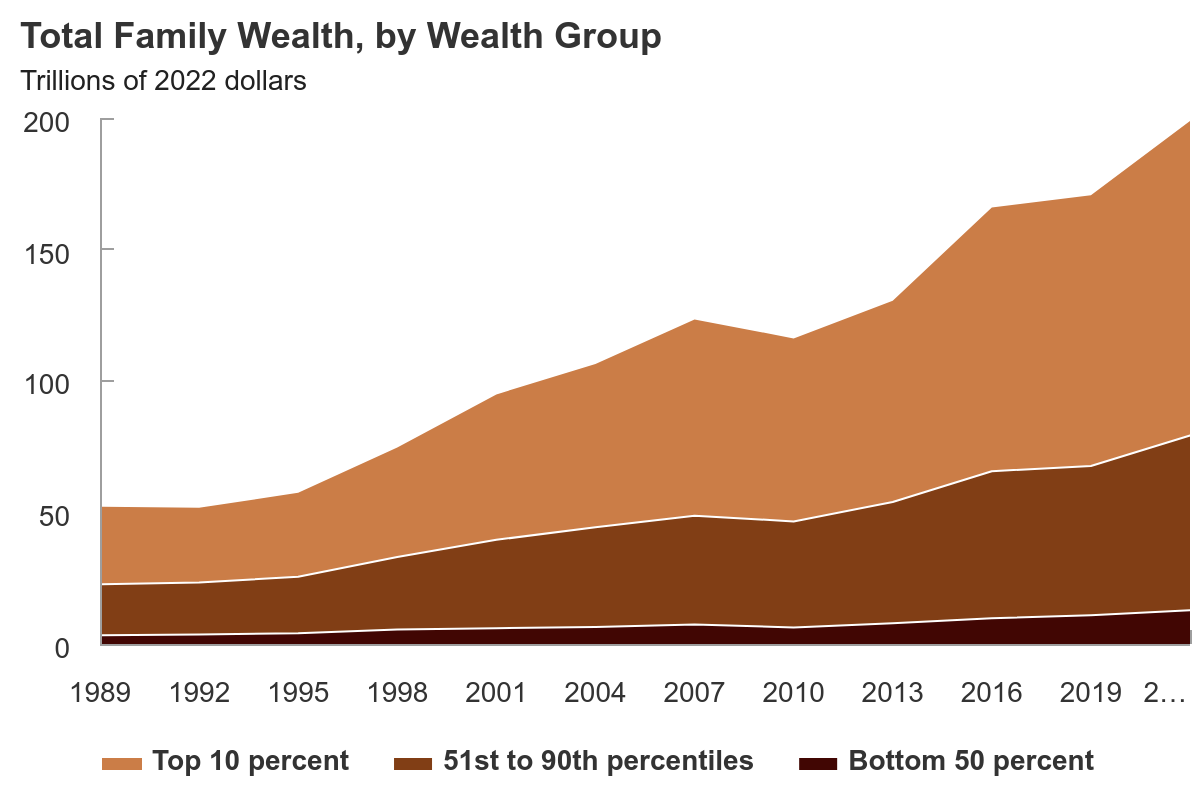
Wealth inequality in the United States increased from 1989 to 2013.

Research published in 2013 shows that the U.S. provides, alongside the United Kingdom and Spain, the least economic mobility of any of 13 rich democratic countries in the Organisation for Economic Co-operation and Development (OECD). Prior research suggests that the United States shows roughly average levels of occupational upward mobility and shows lower rates of income mobility than comparable societies.

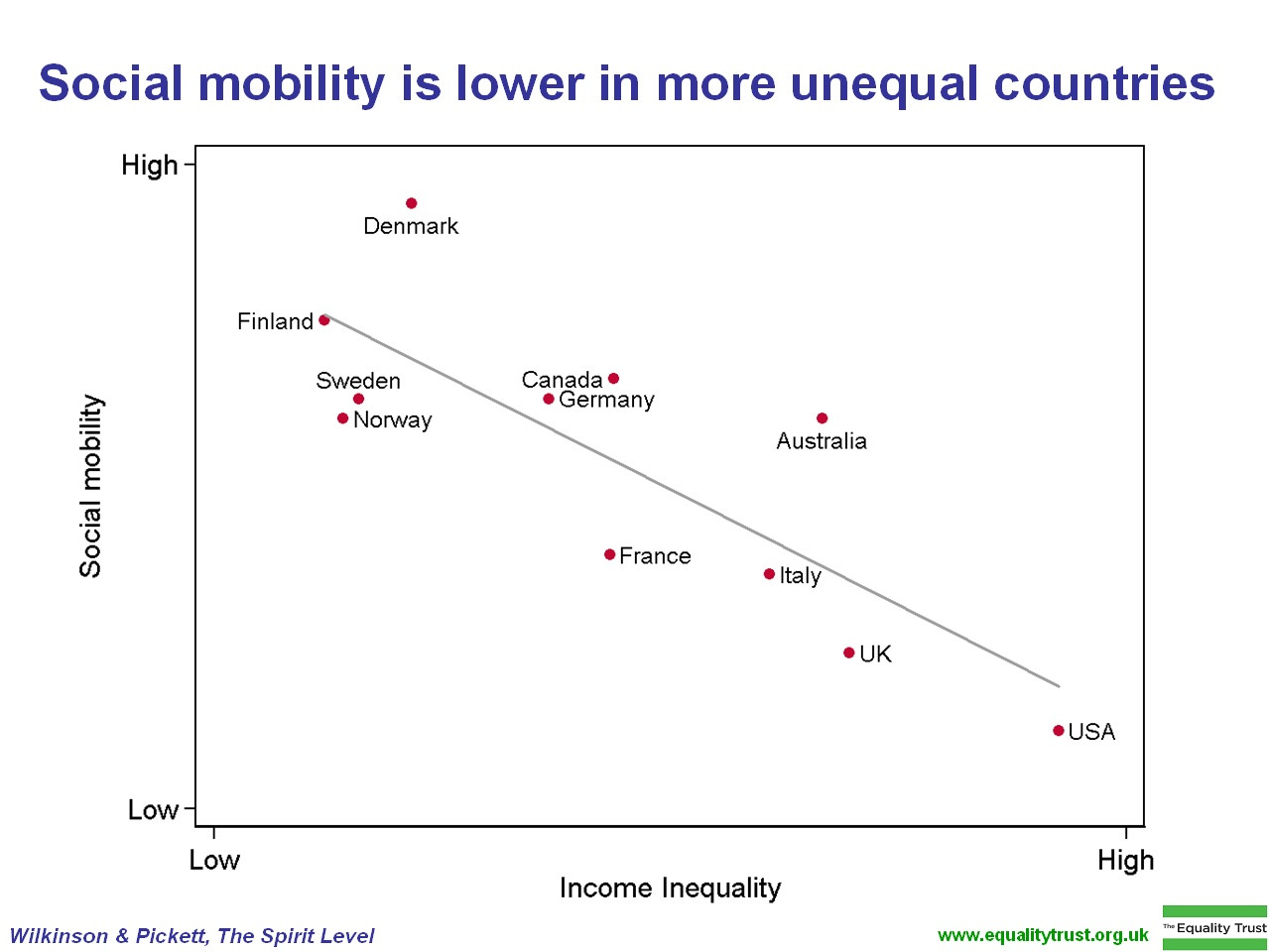
Social mobility is lower in more unequal countries (like the United States).

Jo Blanden et al. report, "the idea of the U.S. as 'the land of opportunity' persists; and clearly seems misplaced." According to these studies, "by international standards, the United States has an unusually low level of intergenerational mobility: our parents' income is highly predictive of our incomes as adults. Intergenerational mobility in the United States is lower than in France, Germany, Sweden, Canada, Finland, Norway and Denmark. Research in 2006 found that among high-income countries for which comparable estimates are available, only the United Kingdom had a lower rate of mobility than the United States." Economist Isabel Sawhill concludes "this challenges the notion of America as the land of opportunity".

Several public figures and commentators, from David Frum to Richard G. Wilkinson, have said that the American Dream is better realized in Denmark, which is ranked as having the highest social mobility in the OECD. In the U.S., 50% of a father's income position is inherited by his son. In contrast, the amount in Norway or Canada is less than 20%. Moreover, in the U.S. 8% of children raised in the bottom 20% of the climbed to the top 20% as adult, while the figure in Denmark is nearly double at 15%. In 2015, economist Joseph Stiglitz stated, "Maybe we should be calling the American Dream the Scandinavian Dream."

A 2023 paper written by academics at Bocconi University, the Rockwool Foundation, and Stockholm University finds "Intergenerational poverty in the U.S. is four times stronger than in Denmark and Germany, and twice as strong as in Australia and the UK," and that an American child who grows up in poverty has "a 43 percentage point higher mean poverty exposure during early adulthood (relative to an adult with no child poverty exposure)," the highest of the five countries and exceeding the next highest by over 20 percentage points. The researchers find "the persistence of poverty is strongly connected to tax rates and what they call transfer insurance effects, which can be considered as akin to a social safety net," and the "U.S. is the archetype of a liberal and residualist welfare state, featuring stratified access to higher education and employment, strong earnings returns to higher education, and a comparatively weak welfare state to insure against risks in adulthood," as well as "exposure to childhood poverty is particularly severe in the US."

A 2017 study states that the UK, Canada, and Denmark all offer a greater chance of social mobility. Black families are stated to be disadvantaged relative to white families when it comes to both upward mobility from the bottom and downward mobility from the top according to the Federal Reserve Bank of Chicago, with social mobility nationwide appearing to have declined since 1980. Social mobility can also vary widely geographically according to a 2014 paper, with the Southeast and lower East North Central states ranking near the bottom.

In the United States, home ownership is sometimes used as a proxy for achieving the promised prosperity; home ownership has been a status symbol separating the middle classes from the poor. Sometimes the American Dream is identified with success in sports or how working class immigrants seek to join the American way of life. According to a 2020 American Journal of Political Science study, Americans become less likely to believe in the attainability of the American dream as income inequality increases. A 2022 study in the same journal finds that exposure to "rags-to-riches" narratives in entertainment make Americans more likely to believe in upward mobility.

According to a 2023 private opinion survey of American people by a Boston-based organization, Populace, the American Dream has shifted its narrative from fame and wealth to personal factors such as secure retirement, financial independence, parenthood and finding fulfillment in their work.

A January 2024 ABC News/Ipsos poll found that 27 percent of Americans believe the American Dream still holds true, down from 50 percent in 2010. A majority, 69 percent, said it no longer applies, while 18 percent said it never held true. In 2010, 4 percent said the dream had never been true and 43 percent said it once held true but no longer does; by 2024, that figure had risen to 52 percent. Belief in the American Dream declined most sharply among young adults aged 18 to 29, falling from 56 percent in 2010 to 21 percent in 2024. Among those aged 30 to 64, belief declined from 48 percent to 24 percent, while among adults over 65 it decreased from 53 percent to 41 percent. Partisan differences were relatively modest, with about a third of both Republicans and Democrats affirming that the American Dream still holds true. Perceptions of the economy were also correlated with views of the dream, as 45 percent of respondents who viewed the economy positively said it still held true, compared with 22 percent who viewed the economy negatively.

According to a September 2025 WSJ-NORC poll, the percentage of US citizens who believe that hard work leads to economic gain fell to 25%, a record low in surveys dating back to 1987. Additionally, it was found that nearly 70% of people said they believe the American dream no longer held true or never did, the highest level in nearly 15 years of surveys.

A June 2026 Reuters/Ipsos poll found that 38% of Americans doubted that the nation will exist as a single country another 250 years from now. About two-thirds of respondents, including 85% of Democrats and 50% of Republicans, believe that American democracy is in danger of failing, an increase from 57% in August of 2025. 77% of respondents believe political violence will likely increase over the next five years, and 30% consider america the greatest country in the world, down from 38% in November 2017.

== Four American Dreams ==
Ownby (1999) identifies four American Dreams that the new consumer culture of the early 20th century addressed:

- The "Dream of Abundance", offering a cornucopia of material goods to all Americans, making them proud to be the richest society on earth.
- The "Dream of a Democracy of Goods", whereby everyone had access to the same products regardless of race, gender, ethnicity, or class, thereby challenging the aristocratic norms of the rest of the world where only the rich or well-connected were granted access to luxury.
- The "Dream of Freedom of Choice", with its ever-expanding variety of good allowed people to fashion their own particular lifestyle.
- The "Dream of Novelty", in which ever-changing fashions, new models, and unexpected new products broadened the consumer experience in terms of purchasing skills and awareness of the market, and challenged the conservatism of traditional society, culture, and politics.

Ownby acknowledges that the American Dreams of the new consumer culture radiated out from the major cities, but notes that they quickly penetrated the most rural and most isolated areas, such as rural Mississippi. With the arrival of affordable automobiles such as the Ford Model T in the 1910s, consumers in rural America were no longer forced to only buy from local general stores with their limited merchandise and high prices, and could instead visit cheaper, better-stocked shops in towns and cities. Ownby demonstrates that poor black Mississippians shared in the new consumer culture, and it motivated the more ambitious to move to Memphis or Chicago.

== Other parts of the world ==
The aspirations of the "American Dream" in the broad sense of upward mobility have been systematically spread to other nations since the 1890s as American missionaries and businessmen consciously sought to spread the Dream, says Rosenberg. Looking at American business, religious missionaries, philanthropies, Hollywood, labor unions and U.S. government agencies, she says they saw their mission not in catering to foreign elites but instead reaching the world's masses in a democratic fashion: "They linked mass production, mass marketing, and technological improvement to an enlightened democratic spirit ... In the emerging litany of the American Dream what historian Daniel J. Boorstin later termed a 'democracy of things' would disprove both Malthus's predictions of scarcity and Marx's of class conflict." It was, she says "a vision of global social progress". Rosenberg calls the overseas version of the American Dream "liberal-developmentalism" and identified five critical components:

(1) belief that other nations could and should replicate America's own developmental experience; (2) faith in private free enterprise; (3) support for free or open access for trade and investment; (4) promotion of free flow of information and culture; and (5) growing acceptance of [U.S.] governmental activity to protect private enterprise and to stimulate and regulate American participation in international economic and cultural exchange.

Knights and McCabe argued American management gurus have taken the lead in exporting the ideas: "By the latter half of the twentieth century they were truly global and through them the American Dream continues to be transmitted, repackaged and sold by an infantry of consultants and academics backed up by an artillery of books and videos".

=== Germany and Italy ===
In West Germany after World War II, says Reiner Pommerin, "the most intense motive was the longing for a better life, more or less identical with the American dream, which also became a German dream". Cassamagnaghi argues that to women in Italy after 1945, films and magazine stories about American life offered an American Dream. New York City especially represented a sort of utopia where every sort of dream and desire could become true. Italian women saw a model for their own emancipation from second class status in their patriarchal society.

=== Britain ===
The American dream regarding home ownership had little resonance before the 1980s. In the 1980s, British Prime Minister Margaret Thatcher worked to create a similar dream, by selling public-housing units to their tenants. Her Conservative Party called for more home ownership: "HOMES OF OUR OWN: To most people ownership means first and foremost a home of their own ... We should like in time to improve on existing legislation with a realistic grants scheme to assist first-time buyers of cheaper homes." Guest calls this Thatcher's approach to the American Dream. Knights and McCabe argue that "a reflection and reinforcement of the American Dream has been the emphasis on individualism as extolled by Margaret Thatcher and epitomized by the 'enterprise' culture."

=== Russia ===
Since the fall of communism in the Soviet Union in 1991, the American Dream has fascinated Russians. The first post-Communist leader Boris Yeltsin embraced the "American way" and teamed up with Harvard University free market economists Jeffrey Sachs and Robert Allison to give Russia economic shock therapy in the 1990s. The newly independent Russian media idealized America and endorsed shock therapy for the economy. In 2008 Russian President Dmitry Medvedev lamented the fact that 77% of Russia's 142 million people live "cooped up" in apartment buildings. In 2010 his administration announced a plan for widespread home ownership: "Call it the Russian Dream", said Alexander Braverman, the Director of the Federal Fund for the Promotion of Housing Construction Development. In 2010, Russian Prime Minister Vladimir Putin, worried about his nation's very low birth rate, said he hoped home ownership would inspire Russians "to have more babies".

=== China ===
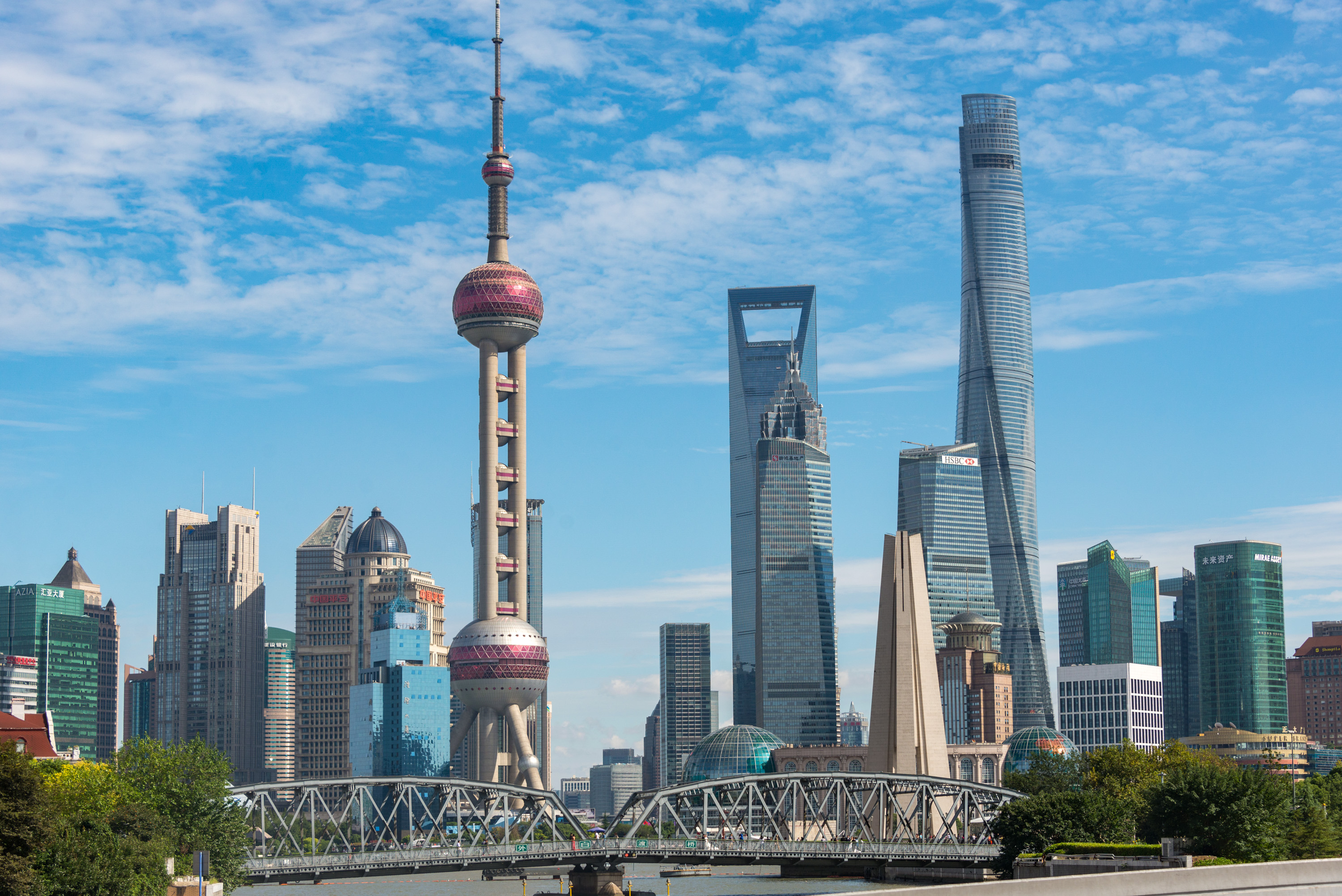
Shanghai in 2016

The Chinese Dream describes a set of ideals in the People's Republic of China. It is used by journalists, government officials, and activists to describe the aspiration of individual self-improvement in Chinese society. Although the phrase has been used previously by Western journalists and scholars, a translation of a New York Times article written by the American journalist Thomas Friedman, "China Needs Its Own Dream", has been credited with popularizing the concept in China. He attributes the term to Peggy Liu and the environmental NGO JUCCCE's China Dream project, which defines the Chinese Dream as sustainable development. In 2013, China's new paramount leader Xi Jinping began promoting the phrase as a slogan, leading to its widespread use in the Chinese media.

The concept of the Chinese Dream is very similar to the idea of the American Dream. It stresses entrepreneurship and glorifies a generation of self-made men and women in post-reform and opening up China, such as rural immigrants who moved to the urban centers and improved their living standards and social life. The Chinese Dream can be interpreted as the collective consciousness of Chinese people during the era of social transformation and economic progress. The idea was put forward by Chinese Communist Party General Secretary Xi Jinping on November 29, 2012. The government hoped to revitalize China, while promoting innovation and technology to boost the international prestige of China. In this light, the Chinese Dream, like the American Dream, is a nationalistic concept as well, providing a vision of a sort of Chinese exceptionalism.

According to Ellen Brown, writing in 2019, over 90% of Chinese families own their own homes, giving the country one of the highest rates of home ownership in the world.

== See also ==
- Achievement ideology
- American way
- Empire of Liberty
- Four Freedoms
- New Dream
