= Inverted totalitarianism =

Political theory about illiberal democracies

Inverted totalitarianism is a theoretical system where economic powers like corporations exert subtle but substantial power over a system that superficially seems democratic. Over time, this theory predicts a sense of powerlessness and political apathy, continuing a slide away from political egalitarianism.

Sheldon Wolin coined the term in 2003 to describe what he saw as the emerging form of government of the United States. He said that the United States was turning into a managed democracy (similar to an illiberal democracy). He uses the term "inverted totalitarianism" to draw attention to the totalitarian aspects of such a system, while the term inverted helps to portray the many differences with classical totalitarianism.

== Wolin's theses ==
Writing on inverted totalitarianism from 1960 to 2008, Wolin argued that the United States is increasingly totalitarian as a result of repeated military mobilizations: to fight the Axis powers in the 1940s, to contain communism during the Cold War, and to fight the war on terror after the September 11 attacks.

Wolin describes this development toward inverted totalitarianism in terms of two conflicting political power centers, namely the constitutional imaginary and the power imaginary. Wolin speaks of imaginaries to include political tendencies as well as existing political conditions. He explains:

A political imaginary involves going beyond and challenging current capabilities, inhibitions, and constraints regarding power and its proper limits and improper uses. It envisions an organization of resources, ideal as well as material, in which a potential attributed to them becomes a challenge to realize it.

Wolin explains that the constitutional imaginary "prescribes the means by which power is legitimated, accountable and constrained". Referring to Thomas Hobbes, Wolin understands the power imaginary as a quest for power that is rationalized by fear of collective mortality. The power imaginary may "undermine or override the boundaries mandated in the constitutional imaginary" through fears of a dangerous enemy:

A power imaginary is usually accompanied by a justifying mission ("to defeat communism" or "to hunt out terrorists wherever they may hide") that requires capabilities measured against an enemy whose powers are dynamic but whose exact location indeterminate.

The power imaginary does not only reduce democracy within the United States, it also promotes the United States as a "Superpower" that develops and expands its current position as the only global superpower:

While the versions of totalitarianism represented by Nazism and Fascism consolidated power by suppressing liberal political practices that had sunk only shallow cultural roots, Superpower represents a drive towards totality that draws from the setting where liberalism and democracy have been established for more than two centuries. It is Nazism turned upside-down, "inverted totalitarianism." While it is a system that aspires to totality, it is driven by an ideology of the cost-effective rather than of a "master race" (Herrenvolk), by the material rather than the "ideal."

=== Similarities to classical totalitarian regimes ===
Wolin argued that the similarities to classical totalitarian regimes include using fear, preemptive wars and elite domination.

=== Differences with classical totalitarian regimes ===
Wolin distinguished between inverted and classical totalitarianism in several ways:

- Revolution – While the classical totalitarian regimes overthrew the established system, inverted totalitarianism instead exploits the legal and political constraints of the established democratic system and uses these constraints to defeat their original purpose.
- Government – Whereas the classical totalitarian government was an ordered, idealized and coordinated whole, inverted totalitarianism is a managed democracy which applies managerial skills to basic democratic political institutions.
- Propaganda and dissent – Wolin argues that while propaganda plays an essential role in both the United States and Nazi Germany, the role it plays in the United States is inverted; that is, American propaganda "is only in part a state-centered phenomenon". According to this model, dissent is allowed, though the corporate media serve as a filter, allowing most people, with limited time available to keep themselves apprised of current events, to hear only points of view that the corporate media deem "serious".
- Democracy – Whereas the classical totalitarian regimes overthrew weak democracies/regimes, inverted totalitarianism has developed from a strong democracy. The United States even maintains its democracy is the model for the whole world.

Wolin (2008) wrote:

Inverted totalitarianism reverses things. It is all politics all of the time but politics largely untempered by the political. Party squabbles are occasionally on public display, and there is a frantic and continuous politics among factions of the party, interest groups, competing corporate powers, and rival media concerns. And there is, of course, the culminating moment of national elections when the attention of the nation is required to make a choice of personalities rather than a choice between alternatives. What is absent is the political, the commitment to finding where the common good lies amidst the welter of well-financed, highly organized, single-minded interests rabidly seeking governmental favors and overwhelming the practices of representative government and public administration by a sea of cash.

- Ideology – Inverted totalitarianism deviates from the Nazi regime as to ideology (profit not white supremacy).
- Economy – In Nazi Germany, the state dominated the economic actors whereas in inverted totalitarianism corporations through lobbying, political contributions and the revolving door dominate the United States, with the government acting as the servant of large corporations. This is considered "normal" rather than corrupt.
- Nationalism – While Nazi Germany and Fascist Italy were nationalistic, inverted totalitarianism is a global superpower based on global exchange of jobs, culture and commodities.
- The people – While the classical totalitarian regimes aimed at the constant political mobilization of the populace, inverted totalitarianism aims for the mass of the populace to be in a persistent state of political apathy. The only type of political activity expected or desired from the citizenry is voting. Low electoral turnouts are favorably received as an indication that the bulk of the populace has given up hope that the government will ever significantly help them.
- Punishment – While the classical totalitarian regimes punished harshly (imprisoning or killing political or ideological opponents and scapegoats), inverted totalitarianism in particular punishes by means of an economy of fear (minimizing social security, busting unions, outdating skills, outsourcing jobs and so on).
- Leader – While the classical totalitarian regimes had charismatic leaders that were the architects of the state, inverted totalitarianism does not depend on a certain leader, but produces its leaders who are akin to corporate leaders.
- Social policy – While Nazism made life uncertain for the wealthy and privileged and had a social policy for the working class, inverted totalitarianism exploits the poor by reducing health and social programs and weakening working conditions.

=== Managed democracy ===
The superpower claims both democracy and global hegemony. Democracy and hegemony are coupled by means of managed democracy, where the elections are free and fair but the people lack the actual ability to change the policies, motives and goals of the state.

Managerial methods under such a system are applied to elections:

Managed democracy is the application of managerial skill to the basic democratic political institution of popular elections.

By using managerial methods and developing management of elections, Wolin argues that the democracy of the United States has become sanitized of political participation, therefore managed democracy is "a political form in which governments are legitimated by elections that they have learned to control". Under managed democracy, the electorate is prevented from having a significant impact on policies adopted by the state because of the opinion construction and manipulation carried out by means of technology, social science, contracts and corporate subsidies.

Managerial methods are also the means by which state and global corporations unite so that corporations increasingly assume governmental functions and services and corporations become still more dependent on the state. A main object of managed democracy is privatization and the expansion of the private, together with reduction of governmental responsibility for the welfare of the citizens.

According to Wolin, the United States has two main totalizing dynamics:

- The first, directed outward, finds its expression in the global war on terror and in the Bush Doctrine that the United States has the right to launch preemptive wars. Wolin and Hedges argue that this amounts to the United States seeing as illegitimate the attempt by any state to resist its domination.
- The second dynamic, directed inward, involves the subjection of the mass of the populace to economic "rationalization", with continual "downsizing" and "outsourcing" of jobs abroad and dismantling of what remains of the welfare state created by President Franklin D. Roosevelt's New Deal and President Lyndon B. Johnson's Great Society. Neoliberalism is an integral component of inverted totalitarianism. The state of insecurity in which this places the public serves the useful function of making people feel helpless, therefore making it less likely they will become politically active and thus helping maintain the first dynamic.

== Reception ==
=== Politics and Vision (1960, 2004) ===
Mark E. Warren and Andrew Nash praised Wolin's impact on the field of politics through both versions of Politics and Vision: Continuity and Innovation in Western Thought, serving as an important warning for the future of democracy. Warren also adds caveats arguing that the part of the book published in 1960 has less relevance in the 21st century, that the new portion of the book makes some leaps in subordinating the positions of historical figures to support his thesis, and that Wolin dismisses too many of the democratic advances in recent years as ultimately serving the elites slowly concentrating power.

=== Democracy Incorporated (2008) ===
Sheldon Wolin's book Democracy Incorporated: Managed Democracy and the Specter of Inverted Totalitarianism received a Lannan Literary Award for an Especially Notable Book in 2008.

Arolda Elbasani, in her review of Democracy Incorporated, finds Wolin's description of the US having some tendencies towards inverted totalitarianism as compelling but "rather exaggerated" and using some historical choices she calls "bewildering".

In a review of Wolin's Democracy Incorporated in Truthdig, political scientist and author Chalmers Johnson wrote that the book is a "devastating critique" of the contemporary government of the United States—including the way it has changed in recent years and the actions that "must" be undertaken "if it is not to disappear into history along with its classic totalitarian predecessors: Fascist Italy, Nazi Germany and Bolshevik Russia". In Johnson's view, Wolin's is one of the best analyses of why presidential elections are unlikely to be effective in mitigating the detrimental effects of inverted totalitarianism. Johnson writes that Wolin's work is "fully accessible" and that understanding Wolin's argument "does not depend on possessing any specialized knowledge". Johnson believes Wolin's analysis is more of an explanation of the problems of the United States than a description of how to solve these problems, "particularly since Wolin believes that the U.S. political system is corrupt" and "heavily influenced by financial contributions primarily from wealthy and corporate donors, but that nonetheless Wolin's analysis is still one of the best discourses on where the U.S. went wrong".

=== Miscellaneous ===
Kevin Zeese and Margaret Flowers expressed the following view:

We are living in a time of Inverted Totalitarianism, in which the tools used to maintain the status quo are much more subtle and technologically advanced ... These include propaganda and major media outlets that hide the real news about conditions at home and our activities around the world behind distractions [...] Another tool is to create insecurity in the population so that people are unwilling to speak out and take risks for fear of losing their jobs [...] Changes in college education also silence dissent [...] Adjunct professors [...] are less willing to teach topics that are viewed as controversial. This, combined with massive student debt, are tools to silence the student population, once the center of transformative action.

Chris Hedges has argued that the liberal class is unable to reform itself and that classical liberalism has been reduced to a political charade that is stage-managed within corporate capitalism. According to Hedges, political philosophers like Wolin are excluded from publications like The New York Times and New York Review of Books because academic intellectuals and journalists prize access to power rather than truth. The book Days of Destruction, Days of Revolt (2012) by Chris Hedges and Joe Sacco portrays inverted totalitarianism as a system where corporations have corrupted and subverted democracy and where economics bests politics. Every natural resource and living being is commodified and exploited by large corporations to the point of collapse as excess consumerism and sensationalism lull and manipulate the citizenry into surrendering their liberties and their participation in government.

Dennis Ray Morgan adds that in addition to the concentration of raw military power, technology is helping to lead the world towards the type of inverted totalitarianism seen in 1984 and Brave New World.

Michael de Young proposes to understand Timothy Snyder's practice as a historian within the political culture of inverted totalitarianism, in which war is propagated through political demobilisation, moral absolutism, and marginalisation of alternative viewpoints.

== See also ==
- Americanism (ideology) – Patriotic ideology in the United States
- Autocratic legalism – Weaponization of legal systems
- Corporatocracy – Society controlled by business corporations
- Corruption in the United States
- Democratic backsliding in the United States
- Income inequality in the United States
- Industrial complex – Socioeconomic concept
- Post-democracy – State operating with formal but co-opted democratic systems
- Prison–industrial complex – Attribution of the U.S.'s high incarceration rate to profit
- Regulatory capture – Form of political corruption
- Sovereign democracy – Term describing modern Russian politics
- Surveillance capitalism – Concept in political economics
- Totalitarian democracy – Dictatorship based on the mass enthusiasm generated by a perfectionist ideology
- Electoral autocracy – Hybrid regime with regular but unfair elections
