= Post-literate society =

Society in which literacy is uncommon due to technological advances

A post-literate society is a previously literate society in which people no longer read, write, or correspond, instead preferring to consume new forms of multimedia.

== Background ==
The term appears as early as 1962 in Marshall McLuhan's The Gutenberg Galaxy, albeit referring to the current society, in which literacy is ubiquitous.

It differs from the reading revolution of the 18th century as defined by Rolf Engelsing as it refers to the contemporary decline in the 21st century.

Its contemporary usage was referred to by the journalist and writer, James Marriott. He was also interviewed on the BBC World Service as part of the Global Story.

A post-literate society would differ from contemporary or historical oral cultures, which do not deploy writing systems and whose aesthetic traditions take the form of oral literature and oral history, aided by art, dance, and singing.

A post-literate society would have replaced the written word with recorded sounds (CDs, audiobooks), broadcast spoken word and music (radio), pictures (JPEG) and moving images (television, film, MPG, streaming video, video games, virtual reality). A post-literate society might still include people who are aliterate, who know how to read and write but choose not to. Most if not all people would be media literate, multimedia literate, visually literate, and transliterate.

== Books ==
While a post-literate society is often invoked in the sci-fi genre, the idea of a post-literate society is an issue of philosophical relevance as well, in regards to McLuhan's work and his Global village theory.

In science fiction, societies are post-literate due to their anti-democratic nature, as in Ray Bradbury's Fahrenheit 451, Dan Simmons' novel Ilium, and Gary Shteyngart's Super Sad True Love Story.

The nonfiction books Amusing Ourselves to Death by Neil Postman and Empire of Illusion by Chris Hedges both observe a sudden rise of post-literate culture.

== See also ==
- Asemic writing
- Cyberculture
- Daniel Bell
- Pivot to video
- Post-industrial society
