= Books v. Cigarettes =

1946 essay by George Orwell

"Books v. Cigarettes" is an essay published in 1946 by the English author George Orwell. It compares the costs of reading to other forms of recreation including tobacco smoking.

== Background ==
Orwell states that the essay was triggered by the experience of an editor friend who was firewatching during the Second World War. He was told by factory workers that they had no interest in literature because they could not afford books.

The essay first appeared in Tribune on February 8, 1946.

== Argument ==
Orwell questions the idea that buying or reading a book is an expensive hobby. Working out that he had 442 books in his flat and an equivalent number elsewhere, he allocates a range of prices, depending on whether the books were bought new, given, provided for review purposes, borrowed or loaned. Averaging the cost over his lifetime, and adding other incidental reading costs, he estimates his annual expenditure at £25.

In contrast, Orwell works out that before the war he was spending £20 a year on beer and tobacco and that he currently spends £40 per year on tobacco. He works out the national average spent on beer and tobacco to be £40 a year. Noting that it is difficult to establish a relationship between the price of different types of books and the value derived from them, Orwell works out that if books are read simply recreationally, the cost per hour is less than the cost of a cinema seat. Therefore, reading is one of the cheapest recreations.

== Excerpts ==
And if our book consumption remains as low as it has been, at least let us admit that it is because reading is a less exciting pastime than going to the dogs, the pictures or the pub, and not because books, whether bought or borrowed, are too expensive.

== Reactions ==
Orwell's essays in Tribune, including this, have been described in The Independent as some of the greatest essays in the English language. The question Orwell raised continues to provide a basis for discussion, as in a review of a poll in which one in four Americans read no books at all in 2007 and that chief executives claim that they have no time to read literature.

The essay was the subject of an article in Structo magazine which published 'Books v. Cigarettes: 63 years on' in their November 2009 edition.

== See also ==
- Aliteracy
- Bibliography of George Orwell
