= Palestine (graphic novel) =

2001 comic journal by Joe Sacco

- Palestine 2001 Cover
- Author: Joe Sacco
- Illustrator: Joe Sacco
- Language: English
- Subject: Israeli–Palestinian conflict
- Genre: comics journalism, New Journalism
- Publisher: Fantagraphics
- Publication date: 2001 (originally collected in two volumes in 1996)
- Publication place: United States
- Media type: Print, paperback
- Pages: 285
- ISBN: 0-224-06982-9
- OCLC: 50841111
- Followed by: War Junkie

Palestine is a non-fiction graphic journal written and drawn by Joe Sacco about his experiences in the West Bank and the Gaza Strip in December 1991 and January 1992. Sacco's portrayal of the situation emphasizes the history and plight of the Palestinian people, as a group and as individuals.

== Publication history ==
The complete graphic novel, published in 2001 by Fantagraphics Books, collects nine issues of Sacco's Palestine comic book, published by Fantagraphics from 1993 to 1995; the single volume edition includes an introduction by Edward Said. In 1996, Fantagraphics had released a two-part collection of the series—Palestine, a Nation Occupied (collecting Palestine #1–5) and Palestine: In the Gaza Strip (collecting issues #6–9). An expanded edition was released in 2007.

In 2023, in the wake of the Gaza war resuming, the book sold out and was rushed back into publication by Fantagraphics after selling out their inventory.

== Plot summary ==
The book takes place over a two-month period in late 1991 and early 1992, with occasional flashbacks to the expulsion of the Arabs, the beginning of the Intifada, the Gulf War and other events in the more immediate past. Sacco spent this time meeting with Palestinians in the West Bank and Gaza Strip and the narrative focuses on the minute details of everyday life in these areas.

In Palestine, Sacco positions himself knowingly as the westerner going to the Middle East to confront a reality unfamiliar to his American audience. Sacco does not delude himself into thinking that, as a "neutral" observer, he can remain invisible and have no effect on the events around him. Instead, he accepts his role and concentrates on his personal experience of the situation. Though his goal is to document events and interview Palestinians, he is affected by the reality of the occupied territories and cannot help but participate in and comment on demonstrations, funerals, roadblocks, and encounters with soldiers. Towards the end, he becomes even more active as he shares food and lodgings with the Palestinians he interviews and even breaks curfew with them while in the Gaza Strip.

In the book, Sacco references Joseph Conrad's Under Western Eyes, Heart of Darkness, and Edward Said's Orientalism to draw links between the situation he is witnessing and colonialism. Towards the end of the book, when challenged by an Israeli that he has not experienced their point of view, he responds that the Israeli point of view is what he has internalized his whole life, and although another trip would be necessary to fully experience Israel, that was not why he was there.

== Awards ==
The 1996 two-volume collection of Palestine was awarded the 1996 American Book Award by the Before Columbus Foundation. In 1999, The Comics Journal—like Palestine, also published by Fantagraphics—named Palestine as #27 in the Top 100 English-Language Comics of the Century. The book was given the 2002 Firecracker Alternative Book Award for Best Graphic Novel.
