= Aliteracy =

State of being able but unmotivated to read

Aliteracy (sometimes spelled alliteracy) is the state of being able to read but having a low motivation to do so. This phenomenon has been reported on as a problem occurring separately from illiteracy, which is more common in the developing world, while aliteracy is primarily a problem in the developed world. However, aliteracy is related to reading ability and comprehension, as reading motivation is an important factor in these skills. In 2002, John Ramsey defined aliteracy as a loss of a reading habit usually since reading is slow and frustrating for the reader.

== UNESCO International Book Year report ==
In a publication analyzing the 1972 International Book Year, an estimate was given that as many as 57% of the citizens of an unnamed European nation known for their production of important books did not read books, or that 43% were book readers. Estimates for other industrialized nations' active readers ranged from 33 to 55%.

== Commentary from authors, businesses and educators ==
Jim Trelease, author of The Read-Aloud Handbook, has stated that this trend away from the written word is more than worrisome, and that it's tearing apart culture. People who have stopped reading, he says, "base their future decisions on what they used to know...If you don't read much, you really don't know much...you're dangerous."

American historian Daniel Boorstin, in 1984, while serving as librarian of Congress, issued a landmark report: "Books in Our Future". Citing recent statistics that only about half of all Americans read regularly every year, he referred to the "twin menaces" of illiteracy and aliteracy. "In the United States today," Boorstin wrote, "aliteracy is widespread." In the United States, a 2008 study reported that 46.7% of adult Americans did not read a book not required for work or school during 2002.

Another alert to this phenomenon was a 1991 editorial in Fortune magazine by Stratford P. Sherman (with Laurie Kretchmar). It refers to a study by John P. Robinson, a sociology professor at the University of Maryland, College Park, showing that the average American at that time spent only 24 minutes per day in reading. Samuel Robert Lichter, director of the Center for Media and Public Affairs, is quoted on his preference for the ease of turning on the TV instead of reading a book.

Kylene Beers's 1996 study connected aliteracy with reading motivation in teens. She noted unmotivated readers complained about not connecting with the text and could not "see" or visualize what was happening in the book. The inability to relate to the characters reduced the desire to read.

Robert Putnam, in his book Bowling Alone: The Collapse and Revival of American Community argues that television has fragmented our society.

== Ways to create readers ==
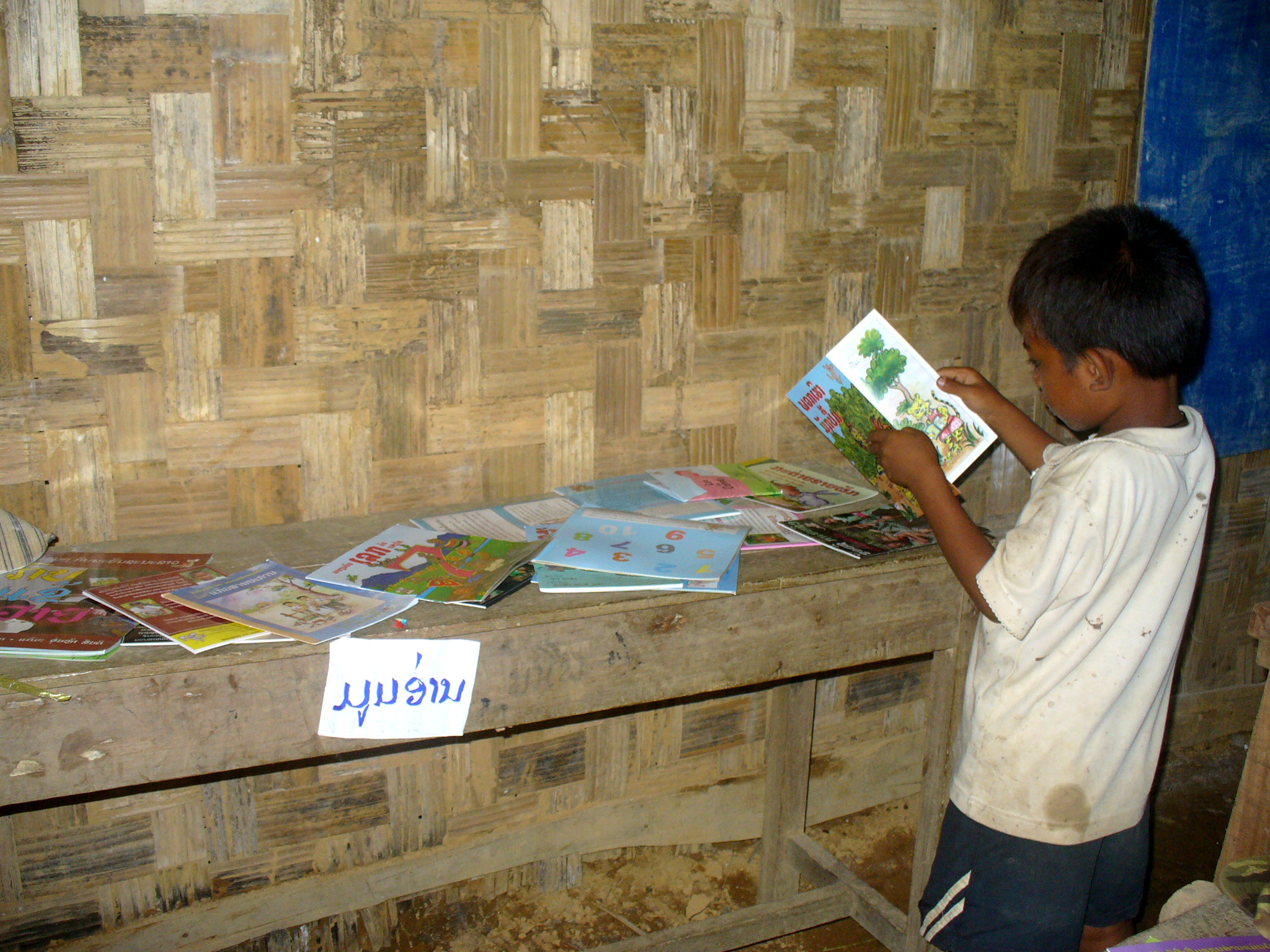
A boy in Laos selects a book to read for his school's new Sustained Silent Reading program.

Motorola is mentioned as making preparations to pay $5,000,000 to teach their workers reading skills, and Ford Motor Company is described as, since 1982, having already sent 32,000 workers to a similar program. Publisher Simon & Schuster was quoted as predicting a market of $500,000,000 per year in the sales of remedial programs to corporations.

Steven Layne's book, "Igniting a Passion for Reading" discusses several proven methods that readers can do to increase the desire to read in others.

One method is to read aloud, both to children and adults. Reading aloud allows the listener to hear the story without struggling through decoding the words and possible frustration.

Another method, used in schools, is to encourage students to read every day, choosing for themselves what to read, and reading simply for enjoyment. This is often referred to as Sustained Silent Reading (SSR). Dr. Stephen Krashen, a leading proponent of SSR, looked at 54 studies of such programs and found that in general, they were successful at improving reading skills and building a reading habit.

== See also ==
- Books v. Cigarettes (an essay by George Orwell)
- Functional illiteracy
- Literacy
- Postliterate society
- Reading
- Strengthening Kids' Interest in Learning and Libraries Act
- Transliteracy
