= Safe Area Goražde =

Journalistic comic book about the Bosnian War by Joe Sacco

- Author: Joe Sacco
- Illustrator: Joe Sacco
- Language: English
- Subject: Bosnian War
- Genre: New Journalism
- Publisher: Fantagraphics
- Publication date: 2000, 2011 (Special Edition)
- Publication place: United States
- Media type: Print, paperback
- Pages: 227
- ISBN: 1-56097-392-7
- OCLC: 44765236
- Followed by: The Fixer

Safe Area Goražde is a journalistic comic book about the Bosnian War, written and drawn by Joe Sacco. It was published in 2000.

The book describes the author's experiences during four months spent in Bosnia in 1995–96, and is based on conversations with Bosniaks trapped within the enclave of Goražde.

Sacco combines the oral histories of his interviewees with his own observations on conditions in the enclave as well as his feelings about being in a danger zone. He keeps his primary focus on roughly half a dozen people, which helps to structure the collection of vignettes into something of a narrative, while also including interviews with a number of other people. Sacco stands back and lets the interviewees tell their stories, keeping his editorializing and personal reflections to interludes.

== Plot summary ==
Joe Sacco visits Goražde, a mainly Bosniak enclave in eastern Bosnia surrounded by hostile Serb-dominated regions. Sacco visits the locals and gets a first-hand view of the war's brutal effect on the town.

The story of Goražde develops through the narrations of Edin, a graduate student who was studying engineering in Sarajevo before the war, and other residents of Goražde.

Yugoslavia had been a multi-ethnic country and its cultural pluralism was proudly propagandized throughout the world. Edin and many others recall having fun with their Serb and Croat friends during the Josip Broz Tito era. However, after the death of the charismatic former Partisan leader, the newly elected president of Serbia Slobodan Milošević begins to incite extreme Serb nationalism among the Serb population. By bringing back the painful memories before the Tito era in which bloody conflicts raged between Serbs, Croats and Bosniaks, he succeeds in inciting chauvinistic sentiment among the Serbs. The republics of Slovenia and Croatia, intimidated by the development of the situation, declare independence from Yugoslavia.

The political situation in Bosnia and Herzegovina is rapidly deteriorating. The Serbian Democratic Party led by Radovan Karadžić represents the ethnic Serbs and is against disintegration; the Party of Democratic Action and the Croatian Democratic Union, respectively representing Bosniaks and Croats, are in favor of breaking apart from the Yugoslav federation. Bosnian Serbs, fearing that once Bosnia gains independence they would be persecuted by the numerically superior Bosniaks and Croats, organize their armed forces and prepare for the upcoming war. The tension among nations is now visible; Serbs and Bosniaks now go to separate cafés. Vigilantes raised from both sides patrol the streets and night for fear of Serb/Bosniak attack. Amid this atmosphere, Edin returns home from Sarajevo to protect his family.

The first attack on the community is realized in 1992. Bosniaks are caught unaware, and many lose their family members and loved ones while escaping from the indiscriminate attack. In the joint offensive of Bosnian Army and Bosniak militias captured Goražde. They find their homes looted and burnt by Serbs. Bosniaks who couldn't escape and were caught by the Serbs were killed in horrendous manners and buried en masse, amongst them Edin's friends. Refugees who flocked from nearby towns of Višegrad and Foča testify their accounts of atrocities committed by Serbs, among them mass executions, rapes, etc.

Residents of Goražde try to maintain life in the town, now sieged by Serb-dominated areas of Republika Srpska. They suffer from destruction of basic infrastructures, shortage of utilities such as electricity, and hunger. Food supplies airlifted by U.S. C-130s flown from Germany help relieve food shortages, but Bosniaks have to risk their lives in the long winter trail to reach the airdropped packages.

In 1994, the town is subjected to a second major Serb offensive. This offensive, orchestrated by the Serb general Ratko Mladić, is in scale much larger than the first offensive, and causes massive destruction to the town. Edin and other Bosniak militiamen desperately try to defend Goražde from the enemy that outnumbers them. Meanwhile, the international society is blind to the humanitarian crisis unfolding in Goražde. Despite having designated Goražde a 'safe area', the United Nations and its military arm in former Yugoslavia, UNPROFOR, make no effort to stop the Serb advance for fear that UN could also be implicated in the conflict and compromise its neutrality. Only after pleas for intervention from the Bosnian president Alija Izetbegović, and the terrible situation in Goražde reaches media and sparks international indignation do the UN and the United States respond with bombings on major Serb military positions. The bombings stop the attack and the people of Goražde once again manage to defend their village at a heavy cost of 700 dead, most of them civilians. A contingent of British peacekeepers are stationed in Goražde thereafter to supervise the disarmament process of the militias.

There were also a few Serbs whose loyalties stood with the Republic of Bosnia and chose to remain in Goražde throughout the war. They were despised by the Bosniak refugees, who lost everything they had at the hands of Serbs; they were equally hated by the Serb militias, who took them for traitors and threatened to kill them.

In 1995 Gen. Mladić plans another offensive in eastern Bosnia and takes it into action. The offensive succeeds due to the inaction of the UN peacekeeping forces. Serb forces take Dutch peacekeepers hostages, and assault the towns of Srebrenica and Žepa, both designated 'safe areas' by the UN. Bosnian forces firmly believed that the UN troops would protect them from attack, hence they were totally unprepared. Both Srebrenica and Žepa fall to the Serbs. Over 8,000 Bosniak males were massacred in Srebrenica, while the Bosniak population in Žepa was expelled. The UN's peacekeeping efforts in Bosnia have failed. After suffering much diplomatic humiliation at the hands of Bosnian Serbs, the United States begins bombing strategic Serb positions. Now the Serbs have turned the rest of the world their enemy; a joint Croat-Bosnian offensive drives most Serbs out of northern Bosnia, and the Serbs return to the negotiating table. Sacco came to Goražde in the immediate aftermath of these events through the 'blue road', a narrow road opened by the UN peacekeepers that links sieged Goražde to the rest of Bosnia.

The Serbs, Bosniaks and Croats finally come to an agreement, and the Dayton Accords is adopted. Among the conditions for peace, Goražde is not to be receded to the Serbs and both sides are required to demobilize their troops. Edin and other residents of Goražde rejoice at this news.

However, townsfolk point out that there is still much more to go. According to the agreement, Bosniak refugees evicted from their homes can return to their homes, but no refugee would dare enter Serb-dominated areas without any assurance of safety.

Sacco re-visits Goražde a year later. Much has changed within a year. The 'blue road', which only aid workers, peace-keepers and journalists could pass through, is now open to everybody. Life goes on in Goražde. A Benetton merchandise shop has opened in Sarajevo. Edin and his friend Riki go to Sarajevo to resume their studies. Edin has no time to waste; he has wasted the most important period in his life in battlefields. He now must get used to everything.

== Awards ==
- A Time magazine "Best Comic of 2000"
- A New York Times Notable Book for 2001
- 2001 Eisner Award for Best Original Graphic Novel
- 2001 Eagle Award for Best Original Graphic Novel
- 2001 Harvey Award nominee for Best Writer and Best Graphic Album of Original Work

== Editions ==
- Sacco, Joe (2000). Safe Area Goražde, Fantagraphics Books. ISBN 1-56097-392-7 (hardcover).
- Sacco, Joe (2002). Safe Area Goražde, Fantagraphics Books. ISBN 1-56097-470-2 (paperback).
- Sacco, Joe (2011). Safe Area Goražde, Fantagraphics Books. ISBN 1-60699-396-8 (Special Edition)
