= War Is a Force That Gives Us Meaning =

2002 book by Chris Hedges

War Is a Force that Gives Us Meaning
- Author: Chris Hedges
- Language: English
- Subject: War
- Publisher: PublicAffairs
- Publication date: September 3, 2002
- Publication place: United States
- Pages: 192
- ISBN: 1-58648-049-9

War Is a Force That Gives Us Meaning is a 2002 non-fiction book by journalist Chris Hedges. In the book, Hedges draws on classical literature and his experiences as a war correspondent to argue that war seduces entire societies, creating fictions that the public believes and relies on to continue to support conflicts. He also describes how those who experience war may find it exhilarating and addictive.

Hedges writes in the Introduction that he wrote the book "not to dissuade us from war but to understand it... - so that we, who wield such massive force across the globe, see within ourselves the seeds of our own obliteration."

== Reception ==
The book was a finalist for the National Book Critics Circle Award for Nonfiction and a Los Angeles Times Best Book of the Year, as well as a national bestseller.

Abraham Verghese, reviewing the book in the New York Times described it as "a brilliant, thoughtful, timely and unsettling book whose greatest merit is that it will rattle jingoists, pacifists, moralists, nihilists, politicians and professional soldiers equally." War, Hedges finds, "exposes the capacity for evil that lurks not far below the surface within all of us."

The entire text of Jeffrey M. Perl's review in the journal Common Knowledge was "So much for meaning."

Lawrence F. Freedman, writing in the journal Foreign Affairs, said "this is an angry, articulate -- an act of therapy summed up by its ironic title." He continues that "Hedges' thoughts on why wars start are at best sketchy, but his explorations of what happens when they do make this book a compelling read and a valuable counterweight to the more antiseptic discussions common among strategic analysts."

=== Allegation of plagiarizing a sentence ===
University of Texas classics professor Thomas Palaima wrote an article for the Austin-American Statesman charging that a single sentence in the book should have been attributed to Ernest Hemingway. Hedges said he had not realized the sentence came from Hemingway and changed the wording of the sentence for the paperback edition of the book.
