= Notes from a Defeatist =

Notes from a Defeatist is a collection of short journalistic comics by Joe Sacco. It was published in 2003.
