= Strengthening Kids' Interest in Learning and Libraries Act =

Proposed US legislation

The Strengthening Kids' Interest in Learning and Libraries Act or SKILLs Act is proposed legislation introduced in the United States Congress.

In January 2015, U.S. Senator Jack Reed (D-RI) joined Senate Appropriations Committee Chairman Thad Cochran (R-MS) in introducing the SKILLs Act (S. 312). The bipartisan SKILLs Act would further amend the Elementary and Secondary Education Act (ESEA) by requiring state and school districts plan to address the development of effective school library programs to help students gain digital literacy skills, master the knowledge and skills in the challenging academic content standards adopted by the state, and graduate from high school ready for college and careers. The legislation would expand federal investment in school libraries so they can continue to offer students the tools they need to develop the critical thinking, digital, and research skills necessary for success in the twenty-first century.

The legislation was previously introduced on June 26, 2007, when Senators Jack Reed of Rhode Island and Thad Cochran of Mississippi introduced S. 1699 and Representatives Raul M. Grijalva of Arizona and Vernon Ehlers of Michigan introduced H.R. 2864.

== Legislative history ==
These bills would amend the provisions of the Elementary and Secondary Education Act of 1965. In the 110th Congress, S.1699 was referred to Senate committee on June 26, 2007. It was read twice and referred to the Committee on Health, Education, Labor, and Pensions. H.R. 2864 was referred to House Subcommittee on Early Childhood, Elementary, and Secondary Education on September 11, 2007.

In the 114th Congress, U.S. Senator Jack Reed (D-RI) and Senate Appropriations Committee Chairman Thad Cochran (R-MS) introduced the SKILLs Act (S.312) in the U.S. Senate. The bipartisan SKILLs Act would further amend the Elementary and Secondary Education Act by requiring state and school districts plan to address the development of effective school library programs to help students gain digital literacy skills, master the knowledge and skills in the challenging academic content standards adopted by the state, and graduate from high school ready for college and careers. Additionally, the legislation would broaden the focus of training, professional development and recruitment activities to include school librarians.

The bill would require states and local educational agencies (LEAs) to the extent possible, at least one state certified school library media specialist in every school that receives such funds.

== Implementation ==
The SKILLs Act authorizes "Improving Literacy and College and Career Readiness Through Effective School Library Programs" under the Elementary and Secondary Education Act (ESEA) which would provide dedicated funds to develop and enhance effective school library programs, which includes activities to:

1. acquire up-to-date school library resources, including books and reading materials that are appropriate for all students in all grade levels;
2. acquire and use advanced technology, incorporated into the curricula of the school, to develop and enhance the digital literacy skills of all students;
3. facilitate Internet links and other resource-sharing networks among schools and school libraries, and public and academic libraries;
4. provide professional development in the acquisition of digital literacy skills and literacy instruction that is appropriate for all grades, including activities that foster increased collaboration among school librarians, teachers, and administrators; and
5. provide students with access to school libraries during non-school hours, including the hours before and after school, during weekends, and during summer vacation periods.

On June 26, 2007, Reed and Cochran spoke to dozens of librarians at the American Library Association's Annual Conference in Washington D.C. about the goal of the legislation which is to "boost student achievement and improve school libraries by ensuring that all schools have highly qualified librarians and the resources needed to help students keep up with the rapid changes in technology"

== See also ==
- Aliteracy
