= War's End =

Comic book by Joe Sacco

War's End: Profiles From Bosnia
- Creator: Joe Sacco
- Date: 2005
- No. of issues: 1
- Main characters: Joe Sacco; Radovan Karadžić; Šoba
- Page count: 65 pages
- Publisher: Drawn & Quarterly
- ISBN: 1-896597-92-0

War's End: Profiles From Bosnia is a journalistic comic about the Bosnian War created by Joe Sacco and published by Drawn & Quarterly in 2005. 65 pages in length, it contains two stories:

- "Christmas with Karadzic", about tracking down and meeting the Bosnian Serb leader Radovan Karadžić. The story was drawn in the period May-Fall 1996 and was originally published in the Fantagraphics anthology Zero Zero, issue #15 (March 1997).
- "Šoba", about a contemporary artist from Sarajevo, Nebojsa Seric (i.e., Šoba), who was at the time a student at the Art Academy Sarajevo and a member of a local cult band; he was drafted into the army of Bosnia and Herzegovina because of the Siege of Sarajevo. The story was drawn in the period June-December 1997 and was originally published in Stories from Bosnia: Šoba (Drawn & Quarterly, February 1998). (As of 2006, Šoba was living and working in New York City.)
