= The Fixer (comics) =

Nonfiction graphic novel by Joe Sacco

- Author: Joe Sacco
- Illustrator: Joe Sacco
- Cover artist: Joe Sacco
- Language: English
- Subject: Bosnian War
- Genre: New Journalism
- Publisher: Drawn & Quarterly
- Publication date: 2003
- Publication place: United States
- Media type: Print, hardcover, paperback
- Pages: 105
- ISBN: 978-1896597607
- OCLC: 53945568
- Preceded by: Safe Area Goražde

The Fixer: A Story from Sarajevo is a nonfiction graphic novel on the Bosnian War, written and drawn by Joe Sacco. It tells the story of a Sarajevan man who, having lost everything else in the war, sells his services — and stories — to Western journalists. The Fixer was published in 2003.

== Overview ==
Unlike Sacco's previous books, The Fixer focuses on a single character rather than a range of sources.

The book starts in a hotel lobby in 1995, near the end of the Siege of Sarajevo. Neven, the Fixer, "who operates as a kind of translator and guide for journalists," has both Muslim and Serbian roots, embodying the erstwhile cosmopolitan essence of Sarjevo, the once culturally diverse city. Through Neven's personal narrative, the book delves into the insider perspective of resisting the Serbian forces during the siege. This task fell to loosely affiliated, quasi-legal factions led by charismatic warlords. Neven, trained as a sniper in the Yugoslav army, joins one such paramilitary unit under the command of Ismet Bajramović, also known as Celo, a former convict with a commanding presence.

Sacco provides insight into the complex moral landscape inhabited by these warlords, whom he characterizes as "military pop idols." While ostensibly defending the city, they engage in confiscations, forced evictions, conscription at gunpoint, and are implicated in massacres and ethnic cleansing. Neven contributes his own anecdotes, such as a dramatic recounting of shooting an enemy through his gun holster while falling backward, adding layers of ambiguity to the narrative.

As Sacco probes deeper into Neven's stories and the warlords' atrocities, doubts about their authenticity emerge. Ultimately, The Fixer evolves into a reflection on the nebulous nature of truth and its significance in the context of the Sarajevo siege.

== Reception ==
In a review, The Guardian called the book "grueling but brilliant." Pulitzer Prize-winning journalist Thomas E. Ricks called The Fixer, "one of the best books I have read about the Bosnian war, and also about war journalism these days." The progressive newspaper The Indypendent wrote of the book that it "...presents a malleable world of gray where everyone’s goal is survival at any cost. With The Fixer, Joe Sacco reinforces his place as a comics master and journalist, and his work merits examination and celebration."

== Awards ==
- 2004 Ignatz Awards
  - (nomination) Outstanding Graphic Novel or Collection
  - (nomination) Outstanding Artist
- 2004 (nomination) Eagle Award for Favourite Graphic Novel

== See also ==
- Safe Area Goražde, an earlier book by Sacco about the Bosnian War
- Fax from Sarajevo, a nonfiction graphic novel by Joe Kubert
- Sarajevo Tango, a crime story graphic novel by Hermann that takes place in Sarajevo during the Siege of Sarajevo
