= Functional illiteracy =

Inadequate reading and writing skills for everyday purposes

Functional illiteracy consists of reading and writing skills that are inadequate "to manage daily living and employment tasks that require reading skills beyond a basic level". Those who read and write only in a language other than the predominant language of their environment may also be considered functionally illiterate in the predominant language. Functional illiteracy is contrasted with illiteracy in the strict sense, meaning the inability to read or write complete, correctly spelled sentences in any language. The opposite of functional illiteracy is functional literacy, literacy levels that are adequate for everyday purposes, and adequate reading comprehension, the ability to read collections of words (such as sentences and documents) and comprehend most or all of their meaning.

The characteristics of functional illiteracy vary from one culture to another, as some cultures require more advanced reading and writing skills than do others. In languages with phonemic spelling, functional illiteracy might be defined simply as reading too slowly for practical use, an inability to effectively use dictionaries and written manuals, and other factors. Sociological research has demonstrated that countries with lower levels of functional illiteracy among their adult populations tend to be those with the highest levels of scientific literacy among the lower stratum of young people nearing the end of their formal academic studies. This correspondence suggests that the capacity of schools to ensure students attain the functional literacy required to comprehend the basic texts and documents associated with competent citizenship contributes to a society's level of civic literacy.

A reading level that might be sufficient to make a farmer functionally literate in a rural area of a developing country might qualify as functional illiteracy in an urban area of a technologically advanced country. In developed countries, the level of functional literacy of an individual is proportional to income level and inversely proportional to the risk of committing certain kinds of crime. In Russia, where more than 99% of the population is technically literate, only one-third of high school graduates can comprehend the content of scientific and literary texts, according to a 2015 study. The UK government's Department for Education reported in 2006 that 42% of school children left school at age 16 without having achieved a basic level of functional English. Every year, 100,000 pupils leave school functionally illiterate in the UK. In the United States, according to Business magazine, an estimated 15 million functionally illiterate adults held jobs at the beginning of the 21st century. According to the National Center for Educational Statistics in the United States:

- About 70% of adults in the U.S. prison system read at or below the fourth-grade level, according to the 2003 National Adult Literacy Survey, noting that a "link between academic failure and delinquency, violence and crime is welded to reading failure."
- 85% of US juvenile inmates are functionally illiterate.
- 43% of adults at the lowest level of literacy lived below the poverty line, as opposed to 4% of those with the highest levels of literacy.

The National Center for Education Statistics provides more detail. Literacy is broken down into three parameters: prose, document, and quantitative literacy. Each parameter has four levels: below basic, basic, intermediate, and proficient. For prose literacy, for example, a below basic level of literacy means that a person can look at a short piece of text to get a small piece of uncomplicated information, while a person who is below basic in quantitative literacy would be able to do simple addition. In the US, 14% of the adult population is at the "below basic" level for prose literacy; 12% are at the "below basic" level for document literacy, and 22% are at that level for quantitative literacy. Only 13% of the population is proficient in each of these three areas—able to compare viewpoints in two editorials; interpret a table about blood pressure, age, and physical activity; or compute and compare the cost per ounce of food items.

A Literacy at Work study, published by the Northeast Institute in 2001, found that business losses attributed to basic skill deficiencies run into billions of dollars a year due to low productivity, errors, and accidents attributed to functional illiteracy. The American Council of Life Insurers reported that 75% of the Fortune 500 companies provide some level of remedial training for their workers. As of 2003, 30 million (14% of adults) were unable to perform simple and everyday literacy activities.

== UNESCO definition ==
Illiteracy, as well as functional illiteracy, were defined on the 20th session of UNESCO in 1978 as follows:

A person is illiterate who cannot with understanding both read and write a short simple statement on his everyday life.

A person is functionally illiterate who cannot engage in all those activities in which literacy is required for effective functioning of his group and community and also for enabling him to continue to use reading, writing and calculation for his own and the community’s development.

== See also ==
- Aliteracy
- Computer literacy
- Health literacy
- Financial literacy
- Functional English
- Literacy
- Literacy in the United States
- Post-literate society
- Reading
- Scientific literacy
