= American Fascists =

2007 non-fiction book by Chris Hedges

American Fascists: The Christian Right and the War On America
- Author: Chris Hedges
- Subject: Fascism, Christian right
- Publisher: Free Press
- Publication date: January 9, 2007
- Pages: 272
- ISBN: 978-0-7432-8443-1
- OCLC: 72799668
- Dewey Decimal: 322/.10973 22
- LC Class: JC481 .H38 2007

American Fascists: The Christian Right and the War on America is a 2007 non-fiction book by the American journalist Chris Hedges. American Fascists profiles the rise of an American Christian right, and argues that the politically active bloc possesses the features of a fascist movement.

== Contents ==
The first chapter leads with an exposition on the importance of establishing the will of God as unknowable in mainstream Christian circles, along with some acknowledgement of Biblical errancy. This is contrasted with the ascendance of a minority doctrine that preaches a faultless Bible that then offers an absolute message about the desires for God to establish a Christian United States through dominion theology and tenuous interpretations of the book of Revelation. The chapter also examines the outsized media influence and corporate support of this minority perspective, as well as their increased political presence during the George W. Bush presidency.

The second chapter elaborates how this new movement is fueled by a "culture of despair" arising from economic uncertainty following widespread outsourcing of United States economic production, and especially has a strong influence in the Rust Belt because of those conditions. It closes with a demonstration on how this despair is opportunistically captured by the Christian right through their religious narratives of salvation and renewal.

The third chapter, titled "Conversion," covers the tendency for churches in the movement to conduct love bombing and other cult tactics to increase membership. This is followed by a chapter on "The Cult of Masculinity" within the movement that permits the subjugation and alienation of women and emphasizes Biblical doctrines that center male hegemony.

The rights of LGBT persons are covered in the fifth chapter titled "Persecution," in which prejudice against gay and lesbian individuals is legitimized within the Christian right through othering and the projection of their own motivations to discriminate. The next chapter outlines how the highly contradictory nature of the motives and doctrines of the Christian right is sustained by a "War on Truth" that legitimizes pseudosciences like conversion therapy and creationism.

The seventh chapter outlines perceived classism and excessive opulence on the part of highly visible business leaders within the movement as well as prosperity gospel preachers. Followers are said to embrace economic inequality as a means of righteous vindication for the elect. The next chapter describes how some religious institutions in the movement primarily view salvation and church membership as a financial imperative. This is followed by the chapter "God: The Commercial," which contrasts the pro-capitalist opulence of Trinity Broadcast Network televangelist Paul Crouch with the destitution and despair of wide swaths of their target audience.

The final chapter, titled "Apocalyptic Violence," evaluated sermons of preachers in the Christian right that included calls to action for preparedness in case of an imminent apocalyptic conflict. Hedges notes that, instead of presenting spiritual influences as an immaterial threat, Christian media like the Left Behind series names existing institutions and Islam as seats of power for the Antichrist. Hedges then argues that the movement, being financially sponsored by a broad range of corporations and increasingly preoccupied with messages of committing violence, represents a threat to the open society. Hedges concludes by calling for opposition against what he describes as a biblically unfounded and deeply fascistic Christian right.

== Reception ==
Rick Perlstein of The New York Times was critical of the work, saying that Hedges "writes on this subject as a neophyte, and pads out his dispatches with ungrounded theorizing, unconvincing speculation and examples that fall far short of bearing out his thesis." Perlstein was unconvinced of Hedges' presentation of the Christian right as a possible violent threat, and continued that "Hedges is worst when he makes the supposed imminence of mass violence the reason the rest of us should be fighting for the open society."

Conservative outlets like National Review and Human Events gave negative reviews for the book, alleging that Hedges exaggerated the violent potential of the Christian right and unfairly characterized the movement as fascist.

A book review by Joe Bailey of the Daily Emerald criticized Hedges' analysis of the political organization of the Christian right, adding that "Christians have the right to pursue their political objectives" and accused Hedges of adopting a "culture war mentality" that may embolden the Christian right.

Historian Jon Wiener criticized Hedges' comparisons of the United States to the Weimar Republic as well as the lack of clarity in the book's policy proposals.

A New York Observer review by Jonathan Liu described American Fascists as "audacious" and "daring" in its wide coverage of social issues and its broad denunciations of liberal and conservative society alike. Liu commented that Hedges' apparent tendency towards hyperbole may have arisen from a heavy reliance on referencing intellectuals who were personally impacted by World War II, such as Karl Popper and Hannah Arendt, and added that his own experiences at an anti-gay Love Won Out event were not as alarming as Hedges described.

In an interview with Michelle Goldberg of Salon.com, Hedges said "it's an angry book," adding that "when I see how these people are manipulating the Christian religion for personal empowerment and wealth and for the destruction of the very values that I think are embodied in the teachings of Jesus Christ, I'm angry."
