= Joe Sacco =

Maltese–American cartoonist (born 1960)

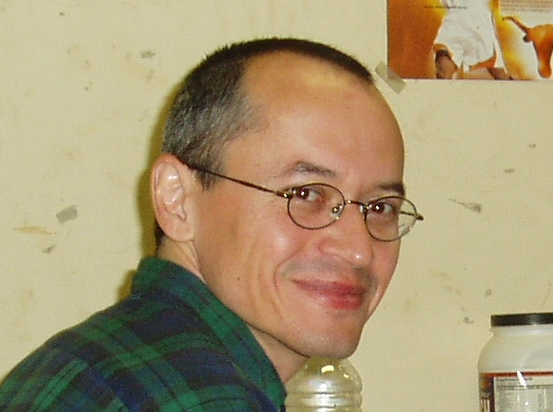
- Sacco in 2005
- Born: October 2, 1960 (age 66); Kirkop, Crown Colony of Malta
- Education: Sunset High School; University of Oregon (BA)
- Occupations: Cartoonist; Journalist; Author
- Writing career
- Genres: Comics journalism; Non-fiction comics; New Journalism
- Notable works: Palestine; The Fixer; Safe Area Goražde; Footnotes in Gaza
- Notable awards: American Book Award (1996)

Joe Sacco (/ˈsækoʊ/; born October 2, 1960) is a Maltese-American cartoonist and journalist. He is credited as the first artist to practice rigorous, investigative journalism using the comics form, also referred to as comics journalism. His work documenting Palestinian life in the Israeli-occupied territories Gaza and the West Bank was awarded the National Book Award in 1996 and was compiled in the graphic narrative Palestine (2001). His other notable monographs include Footnotes in Gaza (2009) which won a Ridenhour Book Prize, Safe Area Goražde (2000) and The Fixer (2003) on the Bosnian War, Paying the Land (2020), The War on Gaza (2024), and The Once and Future Riot (2025) and Requiem for Gaza (2026).

== Biography ==
Sacco was born in Kirkop, then part of the Crown Colony of Malta, on October 2, 1960. His father Leonard was an engineer and his mother Carmen was a teacher. At the age of one, he moved with his family to Melbourne, Australia, where he spent his childhood until 1972, when they moved to Los Angeles. He began his journalism career working on the Sunset High School newspaper in Beaverton, Oregon. While journalism was his primary focus, this was also the period of time in which he developed his penchant for humor and satire. He graduated from Sunset High in 1978.

Sacco earned his BA in journalism from the University of Oregon in 1981 in three years. He was greatly frustrated with the journalist work that he found at the time, later saying, "[I couldn't find] a job writing very hard-hitting, interesting pieces that would really make some sort of difference." After being briefly employed by the journal of the National Notary Association, a job which he found "exceedingly, exceedingly boring," and several factories, he returned to Malta, his journalist hopes forgotten. "...I sort of decided to forget it and just go the other route, which was basically take my hobby, which has been cartooning, and see if I could make a living out of that".

He began working for a local publisher writing guidebooks. Returning to his fondness for comics, he wrote a Maltese romance comic named Imħabba Vera ("True Love"), one of the first art-comics in the Maltese language. "Because Malta has no history of comics, comics weren't considered something for kids," he told The Village Voice. "In one case, for example, the girl got pregnant and she went to Holland for an abortion. Malta is a Catholic country where, at the time, not even divorce was allowed. It was unusual, but it's not like anyone raised a stink about it, because they had no way of judging whether this was appropriate material for comics or not."

Eventually returning to the United States, by 1985 Sacco had founded a satirical, alternative comics magazine called Portland Permanent Press in Portland, Oregon. When the magazine folded fifteen months later, he took a job at The Comics Journal as the staff news writer. This job provided the opportunity for him to create and edit another satire: the comics anthology Centrifugal Bumble-Puppy (a name he took from an overcomplicated children's toy in Aldous Huxley's Brave New World), published by The Comics Journal's parent company Fantagraphics Books. But Sacco was more interested in traveling. In 1988, he left the U.S. again to travel across Europe, a trip which he chronicled in his autobiographical comic Yahoo (also published by Fantagraphics). The trip led him towards the ongoing Gulf War (his obsession with which he talks about in Yahoo #2), and in 1991 he found himself nearby to research the work he would eventually publish as Palestine, a documentary graphic novel, which gathers testimonies of survivors of war and trauma.

The Gulf War segment of Yahoo drew Sacco into a study of Middle Eastern politics, and he traveled to the Occupied Palestinian territories to research his first long work. Palestine came about as a landmark of journalism and the art form of comics. It was based on several months of research and an extended visit to the West Bank and Gaza Strip in the early 1990s. Palestine won the American Book Award in 1996 and sold more than 30,000 copies in the UK.

Sacco next travelled to Sarajevo and Goražde near the end of the Bosnian War, and produced a series of reports in the same style as Palestine: the comics Safe Area Goražde, The Fixer, and the stories collected in War's End; the financing for which was aided by his winning of the Guggenheim Fellowship in April 2001. Safe Area Goražde won the Eisner Award for Best Original Graphic Novel in 2001.

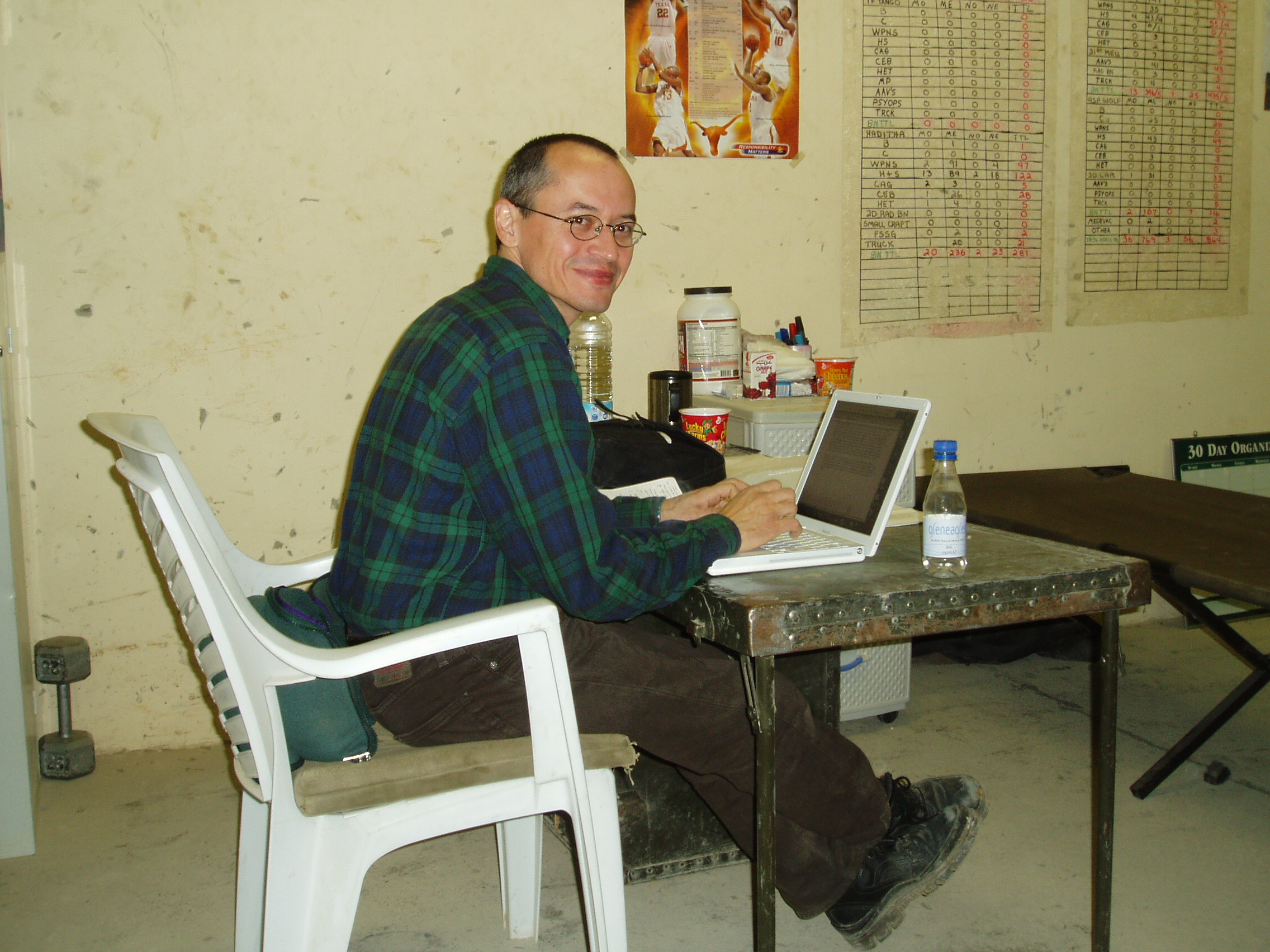
Sacco in Iraq in 2005 with the 1st Battalion, 23rd Marines inside the Haditha Dam

He has also contributed short pieces of graphic reportage to a variety of magazines, on subjects ranging from war crimes to blues, and was a frequent illustrator of Harvey Pekar's American Splendor. In 2005 he wrote and drew two eight-page comics depicting events in Iraq published in The Guardian. He also contributed a 16-page piece in April 2007's issue of Harper's Magazine, entitled "Down! Up! You're in the Iraqi Army Now".

In 2009, his Footnotes in Gaza was published, which investigates two forgotten massacres that took place in Khan Younis and Rafah in November 1956. In June 2012, he collaborated with journalist Chris Hedges, on Days of Destruction, Days of Revolt, a book about poverty in the United States.

In 2014, Sacco published Bumf Vol. 1, a collection of satirical comics about American politics, war, and history. Sacco contributed illustrations and a comics chapter titled "Bitumen or Bust" to Global Warming and the Sweetness of Life: A Tar Sands Tale (2018) by Matt Hern and Am Johal. Sacco's work Paying the Land (2020) is also about climate change and the indigenous Dene community of Northwest Canada who, he says, were subject to cultural genocide by means of compulsory residential schooling, treaties, and colonialism.

In 2024, Sacco published a series of comics on the Gaza War in The Comics Journal that were collected and published by Fantagraphics later that year as The War on Gaza. Sacco's book The Once and Future Riot (2025) is about the 2013 Muzaffarnagar riots.

In 2025, Joe Sacco teamed up with Art Spiegelman, author of Maus, a seminal graphic novel about Holocaust memory, to publish a short comic titled "Never Again! And Again... and Again... and Again..." in several newspapers, addressing the situation in Gaza.

In 2026, Sacco published with Requiem for Gaza – co-authored with Chris Hedges, the former Middle East Bureau Chief for The New York Times — his fourth graphic novel dedicated to the Israeli-Palestinian conflict, which is about Palestinian refugees in Egypt who fled Israel’s ongoing genocide in Gaza. Sacco accused major Western media outlets of a "moral failure", they abandoned their Palestinian colleagues in the Gaza Strip — many of whom were killed in the line of duty (Killing of journalists in the Gaza war) and turned a blind eye to the scale of the destruction.

Sacco lives in Portland, Oregon.

== Legacy ==
Sacco has been described as having revived, advanced, and perfected the genre of graphic reportage and is credited as the first to practice rigorous, investigative journalism using the comics form. He travels to crisis zones to conduct research, write, and draw. His comics from crisis zones have been described as offering insight into regions of the world where exclusion, hatred, persecution, and war occur. They have also been described as giving a voice to people suffering from violent conflicts and fostering understanding and empathy. Sacco is considered the father of comics journalism.

== Awards ==
In addition to his 1996 American Book Award, and 2001 Guggenheim Fellowship, Sacco's Safe Area Goražde brought him a Time magazine "Best Comic of 2000" award, followed by the 2001 Eisner Award for Best Original Graphic Novel, and 2001 Eagle Award for Best Original Graphic Novel, and 2001 Harvey Award nomination for Best Writer and Best Graphic Album of Original Work.

The Palestine collection won the 2002 Firecracker Alternative Book Award for Outstanding Graphic Novel.

His Footnotes in Gaza was nominated for the 2009 Los Angeles Times Book Prize Graphic Novel award. It received the 2010 Ridenhour Book Prize and the 2012 Oregon Book Award. He won the Eisner Award for Best Writer/Artist–Nonfiction in 2010. In 2014, his graphic novel collection Journalism received the Pacific Northwest College of Art Graphic Literature Award in 2014 from the Oregon Book Awards.

Joe Sacco was awarded the degree of Doctor of Literature (Honoris Causa) by the University of Malta on November 17, 2023. In 2025, Joe Sacco's The War on Gaza received the Eisner Award for Best Single Issue/One Shot.

== Bibliography ==
=== Comic books ===
==== Solo ====
- 1988–1992: Yahoo #1–6. Fantagraphics Books
- 1993–1995: Palestine #1–9. Fantagraphics Books
- 1994: Spotlight on the Genius that is Joe Sacco. Fantagraphics Books
- 1998: Stories From Bosnia #1: Šoba. Drawn & Quarterly — reprinted in War's End
- 2024: War on Gaza. Fantagraphics Books. ISBN 979-8-8750-0090-4

==== Editor ====
- 1987–1988: Centrifugal Bumble-Puppy. Fantagraphics Books
- 1987: Honk!. Fantagraphics Books

=== Comics journalism stories ===
- "Christmas with Karadžić," Zero Zero #15 (March 1997) — reprinted in War's End
- "The War Crimes Trials," Details (September 1998), pp. 260–265.
- "The Rude Blues," Details (April 2000), pp. 140–145.
- "Hebron: A Look Inside," Time (March 12, 2001), pp. 40–43.
- "The Underground War in Gaza," The New York Times Magazine (July 6, 2003).
- "Complacency Kills," The Guardian Weekend (Feb. 26, 2005), pp. 16–24.
- "Down! Up! You're in the Iraqi Army Now", Harper's Magazine (April 2007), 16 pp.

=== Books ===
==== Solo ====
- 1993: Palestine: A Nation Occupied. Fantagraphics Books. ISBN 978-1560971504 (collects Palestine #1–5)
- 1996: Palestine: In the Gaza Strip. Fantagraphics Books. ISBN 978-1560973003 (collects Palestine #4–9)
- 1997: War Junkie. Fantagraphics Books. ISBN 1-56097-170-3.
- 2000: Safe Area Goražde: The War in Eastern Bosnia 1992–1995. Fantagraphics Books. ISBN 1-56097-470-2 (expanded edition 2010)
- 2001: Palestine. Fantagraphics Books. ISBN 1-56097-432-X (collects Palestine #1–9) (expanded edition in 2007)
- 2003: The Fixer: A Story from Sarajevo. Drawn & Quarterly Books. ISBN 1-896597-60-2
- 2003: Notes from a Defeatist. Fantagraphics Books. ISBN 1-56097-510-5 (collects Yahoo #1–6)
- 2005: War's End: Profiles from Bosnia 1995–96. Drawn & Quarterly. ISBN 1-896597-92-0
- 2006: But I Like It. Fantagraphics Books. ISBN 1-56097-729-9
- 2009: Footnotes in Gaza. Metropolitan Books, ISBN 0-8050-7347-7. Jonathan Cape, ISBN 0-224-07109-2
- 2012: Journalism. Metropolitan Books, ISBN 978-0-8050-9486-2
- 2013: The Great War: July 1, 1916: The First Day of the Battle of the Somme. W. W. Norton & Company. ISBN 978-0-393-08880-9
- 2014: Bumf Vol. 1: I Buggered the Kaiser. Fantagraphics Books. ISBN 978-1-60699-748-2
- 2020: Paying the Land. Henry Holt and Co. ISBN 9781627799034
- 2025: The Once and Future Riot. Metropolitan. ISBN 978-1-2508-8026-0

==== As illustrator ====
- 2002: From the Folks Who Brought You the Weekend: A Short, Illustrated History of Labor in the United States with Priscilla Murolo and A. B. Chitty.
- 2012: Days of Destruction, Days of Revolt with Chris Hedges. Nation Books, ISBN 978-1-5685-8643-4
- 2026: Requiem for Gaza with Chris Hedges. Fantagraphics Books.

== See also ==
- Alternative comics
- @earth
- Eye
