= Empire of Illusion =

2009 nonfiction book by Chris Hedges

Empire of Illusion: The End of Literacy and the Triumph of Spectacle
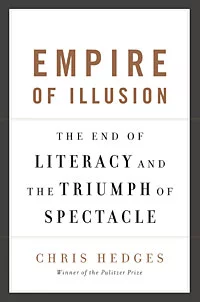
- Author: Chris Hedges
- Publisher: Nation Books
- Publication date: 2009
- Media type: Print
- Pages: 232
- ISBN: 978-1-56858-437-9

Empire of Illusion: The End of Literacy and the Triumph of Spectacle is a 2009 nonfiction book by American journalist Chris Hedges. Empire of Illusion examines what Hedges describes as cultural decay in the United States, as a result of a malignant consumer culture and corporate influences.

== Contents ==
=== The Illusion of Literacy ===
Empire of Illusion begins with an exploration of the narratives found in World Wrestling Entertainment competitions, noting the increased use of class, family, and sexual conflict. Hedges compares the spectacle to Plato's allegory of the cave, and argues that the invented celebrity culture of the wider entertainment world is creating with it a population divorced from understanding reality. Hedges furthers that the rise of artificial relationships and pseudo-events has political implications, particularly with the creation of celebrity status for politicians.

=== The Illusion of Love ===
The following chapter decries the abuses against women in the American sex industry. Hedges notes the prevalence of sexually transmitted diseases in the industry, the rampant violation of consent in pornographic productions, the intentional monetization of adolescent viewership, and profiles the testimonies of women who were traumatized by sex abuse while performing in pornography. Hedges compared the abuse and psychological degradation in pornographic productions to the torture of Iraqi prisoners in Abu Ghraib, and shared critical observations regarding his trips to Las Vegas and an AVN Adult Entertainment Expo.

=== The Illusion of Wisdom ===
In the third chapter, Hedges accuses institutions of higher education, especially prestigious American universities, of prioritizing the teaching of sophisticated systems management over all other fields of inquiry. Hedges charges that universities, at the behest of corporate and defense industry interests, created an academia that lacks critical thinking, overvalues strict analysis and utility, retreats into specialized language, overly accommodates students from wealthy families, indulges in bloated athletics spending, and sacrifices faculty support and the humanities. The end result, Hedges claims, is that higher education is chained to servicing decaying financial and corporate structures without the ability to critically examine and correct its role in the United States.

=== The Illusion of Happiness ===
This chapter is a criticism of positive psychology and self-help media. Hedges denounces positive psychology by pointing to its possible pseudoscientific leanings and the pervasive interests of corporations in the field that seek greater productivity and satisfaction from workers. Hedges charges that advances in positive psychology amount to a corporate campaign to pathologize worker dissent and protest in the name of improving mental health.

=== The Illusion of America ===
The final chapter of Empire of Illusion is dedicated to the political implications of an American culture formed by illusion. Hedges claims that the current United States of America is wholly unrecognizable to its historic form, especially in regards to the loss of civic religion and infrastructure. Hedges argues that worsening economic injustice related to outsourcing and medical debt may lead to collapse, and that unaccountable corporations have seized critical state functions through lobbying and privatization. Hedges laments the potential for a fascist corporate takeover with disingenuous Christian trappings, but balances that vision with a message on the unconquerable power of love.

== Reception ==
Reviews by Laura Penny in The Globe and Mail and by Tirdad Derakhshani in The Philadelphia Inquirer both described Empire of Illusion as a jeremiad. Penny commented that the book may have mixed appeal for being a "declinist screed," and added that Hedges should have taken advantage of analyzing toxic Internet cultures.

Brian Bethune of Maclean's gave a positive review of the book, calling it a "remarkable, bracing and highly moral" lamentation that was "not likely to win a lot of new friends".

Caridad Svich called Empire of Illusion an "impassioned, mournful book" with "strong and fiery writing" that delivers an effective message, but criticized some of its "overblown" rhetoric and charged that the book would have benefited from more thorough references to earlier works on the subject. Svich concluded that Hedges' "elegiac shout is a fully felt and bracing lament" for the deferred revitalization of American democracy.

A July 2021 San Antonio Express-News review by Dennis Patrick Slattery was positive, saying that "[Hedges'] cultural diagnoses have become more prescient and more ubiquitous with time."

Empire of Illusion was featured in a National Public Radio segment and inspired an art exhibit by Dutch photographer Erwin Olaf called "The Empire of Illusion."

In a Genocide Studies and Prevention book review, Virginia Commonwealth University professor Herb Hirsch argued that Hedges, in describing an increasingly disengaged American population, may have also elucidated a real risk for American passivity in the event of human rights abuses or genocide.

== See also ==
- Jean Baudrillard
- Post-literacy
- Neil Postman
- The Society of the Spectacle
