= Days of Destruction, Days of Revolt =

2012 graphic novel by Joe Sacco and Chris Hedges

- Author: Chris Hedges
- Illustrator: Joe Sacco
- Language: English (United States)
- Genre: Graphic Novel, Non-Fiction
- Published: 2012
- Publisher: Nation Books; Navayana (India)
- ISBN: 978-1568588247

Days of Destruction, Days of Revolt is a 2012 illustrated non-fiction book authored by Chris Hedges and illustrated by Joe Sacco, chronicling life in poverty in different parts of the United States.

== Structure ==
The book captures daily life in regions facing 'destruction or revolt', in five sections corresponding with different ecological sacrifice zones:

1. Days of Theft – Pine Ridge, South Dakota
2. Days of Siege – Camden, New Jersey
3. Days of Devastation – Welch, West Virginia
4. Days of Slavery – Immokalee, Florida
5. Days of Revolt – Liberty Square, New York City

Interspersed with interviews from several individuals, as well as monographs that capture the devastation caused to people and the environment, the book investigates ramifications of unchecked post-industrial free market capitalism in the United States.

== Reception ==
A review in The New York Times by Philipp Meyer was generally positive, and especially praised Sacco's illustrations and storytelling. Meyer was more critical of Hedges' contributions, describing his writings as "brilliant at depicting human life at the extremes of existence" but similar in tone to a "high priest." Both Meyer and a separate review by anarchist writer Kristian Williams negatively received the final chapter, which covered the Occupy movement. Williams' review was otherwise positive.

Days of Destruction, Days of Revolt received positive reviews in NJ.com and Library Journal.
