= Chris Hedges =

American journalist, author, commentator and minister

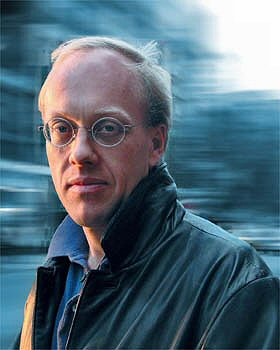
- Hedges, c. 2007
- Born: Christopher Lynn Hedges; September 18, 1956 (age 70); St. Johnsbury, Vermont, U.S.
- Education: Colgate University (BA); Harvard University (MDiv)
- Occupations: Journalist; author; clergyman
- Spouse: Eunice Wong
- Children: 4
- Website: chrishedges.substack.com

Christopher Lynn Hedges (born September 18, 1956) is an American journalist, author, commentator and Presbyterian minister.

In his early career, Hedges worked as a freelance war correspondent in Central America for The Christian Science Monitor, NPR, and The Dallas Morning News. Hedges reported for The New York Times from 1990 to 2005, and served as the Times Middle East Bureau Chief and Balkan Bureau Chief during the wars in the former Yugoslavia. In 2001, Hedges contributed to The New York Times staff entry that received the 2002 Pulitzer Prize for Explanatory Reporting for the paper's coverage of global terrorism.

After resigning from the Times in 2005, two years after receiving a formal reprimand over public statements opposing the Iraq War, Hedges transitioned into alternative media, serving as a columnist for Truthdig for 14 years, hosting the program On Contact on the Russian state-backed network RT America, and writing extensively on war, corporate power, and American culture.

His books include War Is a Force That Gives Us Meaning (2002), a finalist for the National Book Critics Circle Award for Nonfiction; American Fascists: The Christian Right and the War on America (2007); Death of the Liberal Class (2010); and Days of Destruction, Days of Revolt (2012), written with cartoonist Joe Sacco. He currently writes a weekly column at Scheerpost and hosts the program The Chris Hedges Report.

== Early life ==
Hedges was born on September 18, 1956, in St. Johnsbury, Vermont. His father was a World War II veteran, Presbyterian minister, and anti-war activist. He was raised in rural Schoharie County, New York, southwest of Albany.

=== Education ===
Hedges received a scholarship to attend Loomis Chaffee School, a private boarding school in Windsor, Connecticut. Hedges founded an underground newspaper at the school that was banned by the administration and resulted in his being put on probation. He participated in track and graduated in 1975.

Hedges enrolled into Colgate University and, though heterosexual, helped found an LGBT student group. Hedges received his Bachelor of Arts degree in English from Colgate in 1979. He then attended Harvard Divinity School, where he studied under James Luther Adams in addition to studying classics and Classical Greek. While attending Harvard, Hedges lived in Roxbury, a neighborhood in Boston, where he worked as a seminarian and ran a small church. He was also a member of the Greater Boston YMCA's boxing team, writing that the boxing gym was "the only place I felt safe."

=== Early career ===
Hedges gained an interest in pursuing journalism as a means of furthering ministry after a period of close communications with British journalist Robert Cox, who was at that time reporting on the Dirty War in Argentina. While having one year left before graduation, Hedges briefly dropped out of Harvard to study Spanish in Cochabamba, Bolivia with the support of the Catholic Maryknoll Fathers. Following Cox's recommendation, Hedges informally prepared for work as a reporter through studying a four-volume set of collected works by George Orwell. Hedges made some freelance contributions for The Washington Post, and later covered the Falklands War from Buenos Aires for National Public Radio using equipment given to him by NPR reporter William Buzenberg. Hedges returned to the United States to complete a Master of Divinity degree at Harvard in 1983.

Hedges continued his career as a freelance journalist in Latin America. From 1983 to 1984, he covered the conflicts in El Salvador, Nicaragua and Guatemala for The Christian Science Monitor and NPR. He was hired as the Central America Bureau Chief for The Dallas Morning News in 1984 and held this position until 1988. Noam Chomsky wrote of Hedges at the time that he was one of the "few US journalists in Central America who merit the title."

== The New York Times ==
In 1990, Hedges was hired by The New York Times. He covered the first Gulf War for the paper, where he refused to participate in the military pool system that restricted the movement and reporting of journalists. He was arrested by the United States Army and had his press credentials revoked, but continued to defy the military restrictions to report outside the pool system. Hedges subsequently entered Kuwait with U.S. Marine Corps members who were distrustful of the Army's press control. Within The New York Times, R.W. Apple Jr. supported Hedges's defiance of the pool system.

Hedges, along with Neal Conan, was taken prisoner in Basra after the war by the Iraqi Republican Guard during the Shiite uprising. He was freed after a week. Hedges was appointed the paper's Middle East Bureau Chief in 1991. His reporting on the atrocities committed by Saddam Hussein in the Kurdish-held parts of northern Iraq saw the Iraqi leader offer a bounty for anyone who killed Hedges, along with other western journalists and aid workers in the region. Several aid workers and journalists, including the German reporter Lissy Schmidt, were assassinated and others were severely wounded.

=== Yugoslav Wars (1995–2000) ===
In 1995, Hedges was named the Balkan Bureau Chief for The New York Times. He was based in Sarajevo when the city was being hit by over 300 shells a day by the surrounding Bosnia Serbs. He reported on the Srebrenica massacre in July 1995 and shortly after the war uncovered what appeared to be one of the central collection points and hiding places for perhaps thousands of corpses at the large open pit Ljubija mine during the Bosnian Serbs' ethnic cleansing campaign. He and the photographer Wade Goddard were the first reporters to travel with armed units of the Kosovo Liberation Army (KLA) in Kosovo. Hedges' investigative piece was published in The New York Times in June 1999, detailing how Hashim Thaçi, leader of the Kosovo Liberation Army (and later president of Kosovo), directed a campaign in which as many as half a dozen top rebel commanders were assassinated and many others were brutally purged to consolidate his power. Thaçi, indicted by the special court in The Hague on 10 counts of war crimes, is in detention in The Hague awaiting trial.

Hedges was a Nieman Fellow at Harvard University during the 1998–1999 academic year, and chose to study Latin because of his prior interest in the classics from studying Classical Greek.

Hedges ended his career of reporting in active conflicts in October 2000.

=== Terrorism coverage and Iraq War (2001–2005) ===
Hedges was based in Paris following the attacks of 9/11, covering Al Qaeda in Europe and the Middle East. He was a member of a New York Times investigative team that won the Pulitzer Prize for Breaking News Reporting in 2002 for their coverage of Al Qaeda. Hedges also received the Amnesty International Global Award for Human Rights Journalism in 2002. Hedges's contribution to the Times award was an October 2001 article describing Al Qaeda's foiled bombing plot of the Embassy of the United States, Paris.

==== Reporting from coached defectors ====
In a collaboration between The New York Times and Frontline, Hedges authored three articles covering the claims of false Iraqi defectors. Hedges worked on behalf of Lowell Bergman of Frontline, who could not travel to Beirut to interview the purported defectors. The trip was organized by Ahmed Chalabi, whom Hedges considered to be unreliable. The first defector Hedges interviewed identified himself as Lt. General Jamal al-Ghurairy. Hedges consulted the U.S. Embassy in Turkey to confirm that identity, and the embassy falsely did so, as the real al-Ghurairy had never left Iraq.

Hedges wrote a November 8, 2001 Times cover story about two former Iraqi military commanders who claimed to have trained foreign mujahedeen how to hijack planes and destroy vital American infrastructure. The two defectors also asserted there was a secret compound in Salman Pak facility where a German scientist was producing biological weapons. The Frontline report featured statements from American officials who doubted the claims of the defectors.

Conservative outlets referenced the articles in justifying the invasion of Iraq. In the aftermath of the revelations that the Iraqi defectors were not legitimate, Hedges defended his comportment since he had done the story as a favor to Lowell Bergman, adding that "There has to be a level of trust between reporters. We cover each other's sources when it's a good story because otherwise everyone would get hold of it."

=== Exit from the Times ===
In 2003, Hedges gave a commencement speech at the graduation ceremony for Rockford College in which he criticized the ongoing American invasion of Iraq. His speech was received with boos, and his microphone was shut off three minutes after he began speaking. Hedges had to end the commencement speech short because of the various student disruptions, which included an additional microphone cut, foghorns, and chants of "God Bless America."

The New York Times criticized Hedges's statements and issued him a formal reprimand for "public remarks that could undermine public trust in the paper's impartiality". Hedges cited this reprimand as a motivation for resigning from the Times in 2005. In 2013 he said "Either I muzzled myself to pay fealty to my career, which on a personal sense would be to betray my father, or I spoke out and realized that my relationship with my employer was terminal. And so at that point I left before they got rid of me. But I knew that, you know, I wasn't going to be able to stay".

During the uncertainty following the loss of employment, Hedges was looking for posts to teach high school English classes. In a 2008 interview, Hedges acknowledged that he ultimately had not struggled, adding that "every year since I left the Times, I've made at least twice the salary I made at the paper. So, in a way, I didn't pay for it. And I have maintained what is most valuable to me, which is my integrity and my voice."

== Later career ==
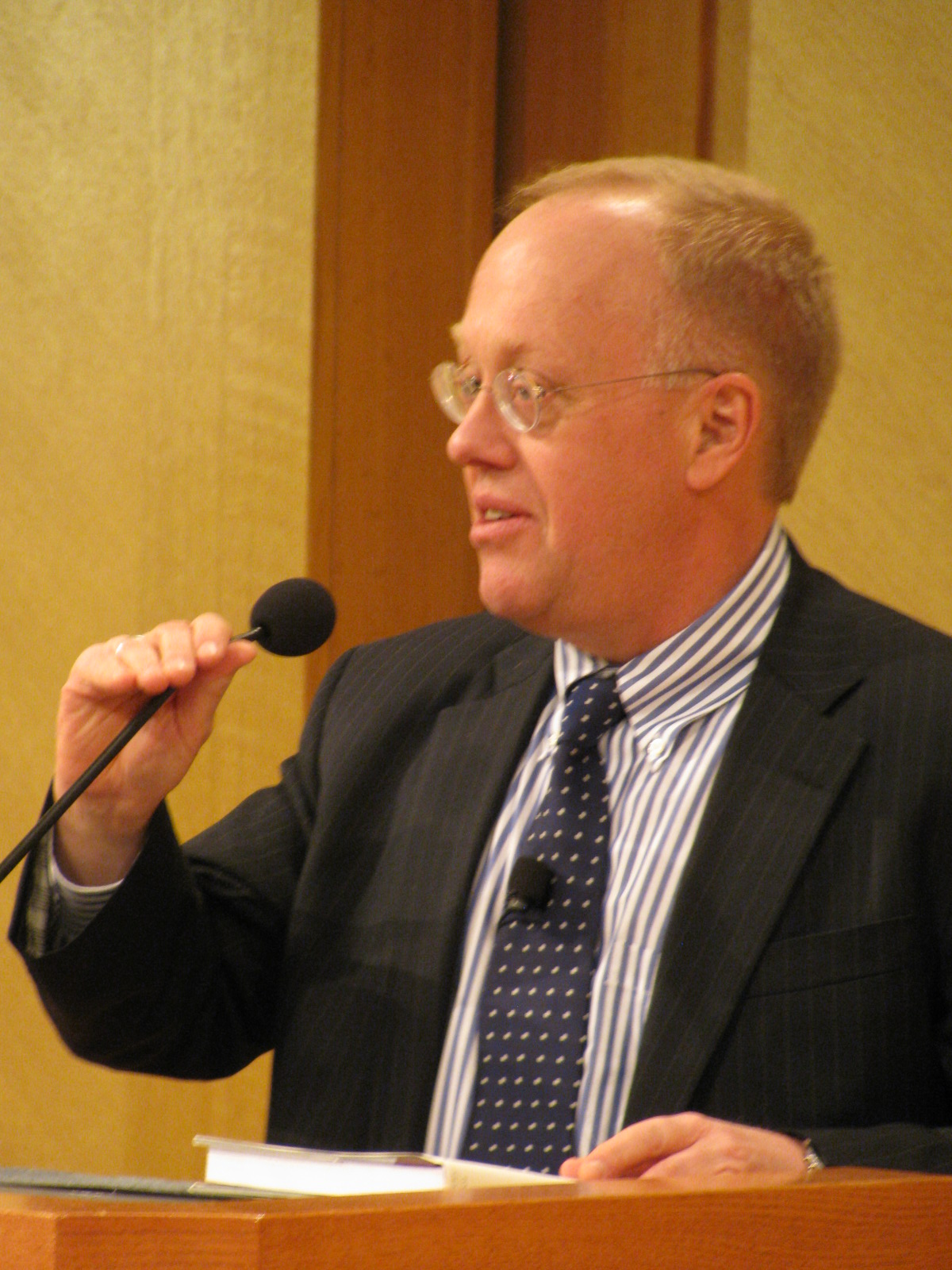
Hedges speaking at Georgetown University in 2013

In 2005, Hedges became a senior fellow at Type Media Center and a columnist at Truthdig, in addition to writing books and teaching inmates at a New Jersey correctional institution.

In 2006, Hedges was awarded a Lannan Literary Fellowship for Nonfiction.

=== Truthdig (2006–2020) ===
Hedges produced a weekly column in Truthdig for 14 years. He was fired along with all of the editorial staff in March 2020. Hedges and the staff had gone on strike earlier in the month to protest the publisher's attempt to fire the Editor-in-Chief Robert Scheer, demand an end to a series of unfair labor practices and the right to form a union. Hedges resumed work with Scheer after the launch of Scheerpost.

In June 2014, Christopher Ketcham published an article on The New Republic website accusing Hedges of plagiarism in several Truthdig columns and a 2010 Harper's Magazine article. The Truthdig posts were updated to give attribution to their author, and the Harper's article was withdrawn.

In December 2014, Hedges was disinvited from the University of Pennsylvania to speak at a conference held by the university's International Affairs Association that was scheduled on April 3, 2015 after he published a column on Truthdig where he compared Islamic State's tactics to the actions of Zionist militias that "used violence, terrorism, foreign fighters, clandestine arms shipments and foreign money, along with horrific ethnic cleansing and the massacre of hundreds of Arab civilians, to create Israel."

Additional accusations of plagiarism from Ketcham were countered by an independent investigation from the Type Media Center.

=== Prison writing teacher ===
Hedges has worked for a decade teaching writing classes in prisons in New Jersey through a program offered by Princeton University and later Rutgers University. A class that Hedges taught at East Jersey State Prison in 2013 went on to collaborate in the creation of a play titled Caged. Hedges has long been a fierce critic of mass incarceration in the United States, and his experience as an educator in New Jersey prisons served as inspiration for his 2021 book Our Class: Trauma and Transformation in an American Prison.

=== Ordination and ministerial installation ===
On October 5, 2014, Hedges was ordained a minister within the Presbyterian Church. He was installed as Associate Pastor and Minister of Social Witness and Prison Ministry at the Second Presbyterian Church Elizabeth in Elizabeth, New Jersey. He mentioned being rejected for ordination 30 years earlier, saying that "going to El Salvador as a reporter was not something the Presbyterian Church at the time recognized as a valid ministry, and a committee rejected my 'call.'"

=== On Contact (2016–2022) ===
Hedges began hosting the television show On Contact for the Russian-government owned network RT America in June 2016. Hedges, who said he had not known much about the network at the time, was approached to make a show by RT America president Mikhail "Misha" Solodovnikov, who promised him complete editorial independence.

On Contact provided commentary on social issues, often profiling non-fiction authors and their recently published works, with Hedges aiming to follow the approach of former public television shows. On Contact was nominated for an Emmy in 2017, RT America's first significant award nomination, but the award was won by Steve.

On March 3, 2022, RT America ceased operations following the widespread deplatforming of Russian-sponsored media after the 2022 Russian invasion of Ukraine. The run of On Contact ended. In a March 7, 2022 Scheerpost column (reprinted by Salon), Hedges wrote about the reprimand he received from The New York Times for his Iraq War opposition, comparing it to RT America, which made no comment on Hedges's condemnation of the Russian invasion of Ukraine. Hedges said he "might have paid with" his job for making negative comments about the war on Ukraine, "but at least for those six days", after the invasion, he remained in post.

=== The Chris Hedges Report (2022–present) ===
Hedges, in collaboration with The Real News Network (TRNN), began production for The Chris Hedges Report in April 2022. In May 2024, TRNN announced that they had amicably ended their production partnership with Hedges, citing editorial limitations for nonprofit newsrooms like TRNN. The Chris Hedges Report continues to be produced through Hedges's Substack.

=== Activism and direct involvement with politics ===
In the 2008 United States presidential campaign, Hedges was a speech writer for candidate Ralph Nader. Hedges supported Green Party candidate Jill Stein in the 2016 election.

On April 15, 2016, Hedges was arrested, along with 100 other protesters, during a sit-in outside the Capitol building in Washington, D.C., during Democracy Spring to protest the influence of corporate lobbying and special interests in politics.

On May 27, 2020, Hedges announced that he would run as a Green Party candidate in New Jersey's 12th congressional district for the 2020 elections. After being informed the following day that running for office would conflict with FCC fairness doctrine rules because he was at that time hosting the nationally broadcast RT America television show On Contact, Hedges decided not to pursue office in order to keep hosting the show.

In September 2020, Hedges spoke at the Movement for a People's Party convention.

== Political views ==
Class struggle defines most of human history. Marx got this right. It is not a new story. The rich, throughout history, have found ways to subjugate and re-subjugate the masses. And the masses, throughout history, have cyclically awoken to throw off their chains.

— Chris Hedges "America's New Class War", Scheerpost, January 18, 2022

Hedges has described himself as a socialist and an anarchist. His books Death of the Liberal Class, Empire of Illusion and Days of Destruction, Days of Revolt are strongly critical of American liberalism and unfettered corporate capitalism, characterizing the latter as a system where the ruthless hunt for profit "creates a world where everything and everyone is expendable" and "nothing is sacred."

Hedges's 2007 book American Fascists describes the fundamentalist Christian right in the United States as a fascist movement. In March 2008, Hedges published the book I Don't Believe in Atheists, in which he argues that new atheism presents a danger that is similar to religious extremism.

In November 2016, following the election of Donald Trump as next US President, Hedges' predicted in Truthdig: "The repression of dissents will soon resemble the repression under past totalitarian regimes. State security will become an invasive and palpable presence. The most benign forms of opposition will be treated as if they are a threat to national security. Many, hoping to avoid the wrath of the state, will become compliant and passive."

=== Russian invasion of Ukraine ===
In March 2022, Hedges criticized Russian military intervention in Ukraine as a "criminal war of aggression", but also criticized NATO's expansion as a dangerous and predictable provocation that baited Russia to initiate a conflict. Hedges called for Russia's withdrawal, an immediate ceasefire and moratorium on arms shipments to Ukraine. He later stated that the invasion was "set to become a lengthy war of attrition, one funded and backed by an increasingly bellicose United States." Hedges criticized the $40 billion aid package for Ukraine in a May 2022 piece, which he says demonstrates that the United States is "trapped in the death spiral of unchecked militarism" as the country "rots, morally, politically, economically, and physically," with no real plans to address the epidemic of mass shootings, decaying infrastructure, lack of universal health-care, rising income inequality, student debt, child poverty and the opioid epidemic. In his 2022 book The Greatest Evil is War, Hedges wrote that "Russia has every right to feel threatened, betrayed, and angry. But to understand is not to condone. The invasion of Ukraine, under post-Nuremberg laws, is a criminal war of aggression."

Hedges accused online social networks of censoring those who opposed the "dominant narrative on Ukraine", and criticized the decision to remove Scott Ritter from Twitter for providing the "counter-narrative" that the Bucha massacre was perpetrated by Ukrainian national police rather than the Russian Armed Forces.

=== Israel’s genocide in Gaza ===
In late 2023 and early 2024, Hedges gave lectures on the Gaza genocide, dedicated episodes of his show The Chris Hedges Report to the topic, and appeared as a guest on the Marc Steiner Show. He believes that, since Zionism's early days, its goals have been the possession of all of Mandatory Palestine and the extermination of the Palestinian people. He states that the end game of Netanyahu's ruling coalition is to permanently destroy the idea of a State of Palestine, to be accomplished through acts of genocide and ethnic cleansing. He cites the withholding of food, water, medicine, and the bombing of hospitals, during the war as examples of such acts. He states that Israel, with the rise to power of the ultranationalist Jewish-supremacist far-right, which he calls the heirs to Meir Kahane, as evidence of Israel having developed into a fully fascist, hate-filled, Jewish-supremacist apartheid state. Furthermore, he predicts that the state will continue to pursue its transformation into an ethnoreligiously pure state with the expulsion of all Palestinians, including even Israeli citizens of Palestinian ethnicity. Hedges criticizes the "total support" for the Israeli narrative shown by former U.S. President Biden, the U.S. government, and U.S. and European media. Examples of such "total support" include providing military support and voting down cease-fire proposals in the United Nations. He supports the BDS movement, ending aid to and sanctioning Israel. Hedges argues that Israel's genocide of Palestinians has "signed its own death sentence" with respect to its "social capital", losing its "facade of civility, its supposed vaunted respect for rule of law and democracy, its mythical story of the courageous Israeli military and miraculous birth of the Jewish nation will lie in ash heaps".

Writing in his 2026 book Requiem for Gaza, Hedges argues that the Gaza genocide "marks the death of a global order guided by internationally agreed-upon laws and rules" as the US and its Western allies "not only supply weaponry to sustain the genocide but obstruct any efforts to preserve international humanitarian law."

=== Environmental views ===
On September 20, 2014, a day before the People's Climate March, Hedges joined Bernie Sanders, Naomi Klein, Bill McKibben, and Kshama Sawant on a panel moderated by WNYC's Brian Lehrer to discuss the issue of climate change.

Hedges has argued that the impact of population growth must be addressed, saying "all measures to thwart the degradation and destruction of our ecosystem will be useless if we do not cut population growth."

=== Occupy involvement ===
Hedges appeared as a guest on an October 2011 episode of the CBC News Network's Lang and O'Leary Exchange to discuss his support for the Occupy Wall Street protests; co-host Kevin O'Leary criticized him, saying that he sounded "like a left-wing nutbar". Hedges said "it will be the last time" he appears on the show, and compared the CBC to Fox News. CBC's ombudsman found O'Leary's heated remarks to be a violation of the public broadcaster's journalistic standards.

On November 3, 2011, Hedges was arrested with others in New York City as part of the Occupy Wall Street demonstration, during which the activists staged a "people's hearing" on the activities of the investment bank Goldman Sachs and blocked the entrance to their corporate headquarters.

=== NDAA lawsuit ===
In 2012, after the Obama administration signed the National Defense Authorization Act (NDAA), Hedges sued members of the US government, asserting that Section 1021 of the law unconstitutionally allowed presidential authority for indefinite detention without habeas corpus. He was later joined in the suit, Hedges v. Obama, by activists including Noam Chomsky and Daniel Ellsberg. In May 2012 Judge Katherine B. Forrest of the Southern District of New York ruled that the counter-terrorism provision of the NDAA is unconstitutional.

The Obama administration appealed the decision, and it was overturned in July 2013 by the Second Circuit Court of Appeals. Hedges petitioned the U.S. Supreme Court to hear the case, but the Supreme Court denied certiorari in April 2014.

Hedges was previously a plaintiff in Clapper v. Amnesty International.

=== PEN America ===
Chris Hedges reported in his The Chris Hedges Report website in March 2024, "In May 2013 I resigned from PEN America over the appointment of former State Department official Suzanne Nossel. A decade later, PEN America has become a propaganda arm of the state."

== Personal life ==
Hedges is married to Canadian actor, writer, and vegan activist Eunice Wong. The couple have two children. He also has two children from a previous marriage. Hedges lives in Princeton, New Jersey, as of 2023. In November 2014, Hedges announced that he and his family had become vegan. He compared his decision to a vow of abstinence, adding that it is necessary "to make radical changes to save ourselves from ecological meltdown." Hedges authored an introduction to a vegan cookbook in 2015, The Anarchist Cookbook, written by Keith McHenry and Chaz Bufe.

Hedges has post-traumatic stress disorder from his experience reporting in war zones. Hedges speaks Levantine Arabic, Koine Greek, French, and Spanish in addition to his native English.

== Books ==
- 2002: War Is a Force That Gives Us Meaning (ISBN 1-58648-049-9)
- 2003: What Every Person Should Know About War (ISBN 1-4177-2104-9)
- 2005: Losing Moses on the Freeway: The 10 Commandments in America (ISBN 0-7432-5513-5)
- 2007: American Fascists: The Christian Right and the War on America (ISBN 0-7432-8443-7)
- 2008: I Don't Believe in Atheists (ISBN 1-4165-6795-X)
  - 2009: When Atheism Becomes Religion: America's New Fundamentalists, (ISBN 978-1-4165-7078-3), a retitled edition
- 2008: Collateral Damage: America's War Against Iraqi Civilians, with Laila Al-Arian (ISBN 1-56858-373-7)
- 2009: Empire of Illusion: The End of Literacy and the Triumph of Spectacle (ISBN 978-1-56858-437-9)
- 2010: Death of the Liberal Class (ISBN 978-1-56858-644-1)
- 2010: The World As It Is: Dispatches on the Myth of Human Progress (ISBN 978-1-56858-640-3)
- 2012: Days of Destruction, Days of Revolt, with Joe Sacco (ISBN 978-1-56858-643-4)
- 2015: Wages of Rebellion: The Moral Imperative of Revolt (ISBN 1-56858-966-2)
- 2016: Unspeakable (ISBN 1-5107-1273-9)
- 2018: America: The Farewell Tour (ISBN 978-1-5011-5267-2)
- 2021: Our Class: Trauma and Transformation in an American Prison (ISBN 978-1982154431)
- 2022: The Greatest Evil is War (ISBN 978-1644212936)
- 2025: A Genocide Foretold: Reporting on Survival and Resistance in Occupied Palestine (ISBN 978-1644214855)
- 2026: Requiem for Gaza, with Joe Sacco (ISBN 979-8875002724)

== See also ==
- Christian left
- Sacrifice zone
- Liberation theology
- Tomas Young § The Last Letter
