= March on Washington Film Festival =

The March on Washington Film festival (rebranded in 2024 to March On!) is an annual Civil Rights Legacy Project that has traditionally taken place in various locations across Washington, D.C. It offers film screenings, an emerging and student filmmaker competition, various award ceremonies, performances of the arts, exhibits and panel discussions featuring filmmakers, academics, and activists.

The Festival was founded in 2013 by Robert Raben, former Assistant Attorney General at the Department of Justice under former President Clinton, and founder of The Raben Group, a national public policy firm in Washington D.C. The March on Washington Film Festival features film, first-person accounts, scholarship, and the performing and visual arts to share stories based on the civil rights movement.

In 2024, they expanded from a festival into a year-round arts platform. This transformation included a refreshed visual identity, a redesigned website, expanded year-round programming, and a new name: March On!

== Description ==
The flagship festival was founded in 2013 in Washington, D.C. to commemorate the 50th anniversary of the March on Washington for Jobs and Freedom. The festival attracted over 1,000 attendees to ten events over the span of two weeks at venues across Washington D.C.

Participants have included writers Ta-Nehisi Coates, and Kitty Kelley; Pulitzer Prize-winning historians Taylor Branch, Gilbert King, Diane McWhorter, and Isabel Wilkerson, journalists Eugene Robinson and Hank Klibanoff; former U.S. Attorneys General Eric Holder and Loretta Lynch; performers Diahann Carroll, Yara Shahidi, Carmen De Lavellade and 9th Wonder; and prominent Civil Rights veterans Joyce and Dorie Ladner, Rep. Eleanor Holmes Norton, Julian Bond, Rev. C.T. Vivian, and Judge Damon Keith.

== History ==
=== 2013 ===
In 2013, the festival was founded in honor of the 50th anniversary of the March on Washington for Jobs and Freedom. Since then, the festival has occurred annually in the Washington, D.C. area.

=== 2014 ===
The 2014 festival toured to three cities: Atlanta, Georgia, New York, New York, and Washington, D.C. Films included "Sam Cooke: Legend” with a performance by members of Ebenezer Baptist Church choir, and “Nothing But a Man,” followed by talk by Georgia State University Professor Jonathan Gayles. Isisara Bey, former radio personality, television news producer, Sony Pictures and Sony Music executive, joined the festival in 2014 as Artistic Director, and has continued to guide its cultural, historic and artistic vision.

=== 2015 ===
For the 2015 festival, the opening night focused on Fannie Lou Hamer, featuring the film "This Little Light of Mine: The Legacy of Fannie Lou Hamer,” with panelists including filmmaker Robin Hamilton, Vergie Hamer Faulkner, Dorie Ladner, Dr. Leslie McLemore, Reverend Ed King and Eleanor Holmes Norton.

The second night, A’lelia Bundles moderated a panel discussion that included Clarence Jones, Taylor Branch, Gilbert King and Diane McWhorter, and Michael Eric Dyson.

=== 2016 ===
In 2016, the Emerging and Student Filmmaker Competition was introduced to the festival. It is managed by Opal H. Bennett, Festival Consultant. This was also the first year that MOWFF served as collaborator for the Apollo Theater and New York Public Radio’s Annual Commemoration of the Dr. Martin Luther King, Jr. Holiday, a tradition that has continued each year since.

=== 2017 ===
The 2017 March on Washington Film Festival took place from July 13th to July 22nd and consisted of 21 events. This year featured the first annual Vivian Malone Courage Award which was awarded to author Ta-Nehisi Coates by Vivian Malone's sister, Dr. Sharon Malone, whose husband is the former Attorney General Eric Holder. Vivian Malone was one of two students who integrated the University of Alabama and was the first African-American woman to graduate from the University of Alabama.

This was also the first year the March on Washington Film Festival hosted the Freedom's Children Student Journalists Competition. High school and undergraduate students from around the country submitted writing samples for the chance to publish original work covering the film festival in various major news outlets.

=== 2018 ===
The 2018 March on Washington Film Festival began on July 12 and went through July 21, and included 27 events.

The Festival's Opening Night event was a Tribute to Sonia Sanchez, seminal figure of the 1960s Black Arts Movement, who has raised her voice as a poet, playwright, teacher, activist, early Spoken word artist and thought leader in African American culture for over half a century. Amanda Gorman, the first US National Youth Poet Laureate and inaugural poet for President Biden, delivered an original composition in Sanchez's honor.

That same year, MOWFF proudly hosted an art exhibit presented by Black Art in America, and curated by its founder, artist Najee Dorsey. The exhibit featured the work of the Spiral Group, a collective of famed artists including Romare Bearden, Norman Lewis, Hale Woodruff and Emma Amos among others. The Group formed in 1963 in support of the March On Washington for Jobs and Freedom of that year. Their mission was to use their art and influence for social justice. The name "spiral" referred to the Archimedean spiral that moves outward, embracing all directions, while continually moving upward. The MOWFF exhibit paired works from the original Spiral Group with that of contemporary African American artists.

=== 2019 ===
The 2019 festival celebrated women in the civil rights movement. It consisted of 22 events and was held in Washington, D.C. from September 22–29. This year introduced the March on Washington Film Festival Inaugural Awards Gala, and honored Congresswoman Terri Sewell, Peggy Wallace Kennedy, and Dr. Joyce Ladner. The Lifetime Legacy award was given to Nikki Giovanni.

The death of 14-year-old Emmett Till in 1955 was the foundation for the Festival program She Lied – Carolyn Bryant and the Murder of Emmett Till. The acquittal of Till's murderers (Bryant's husband and brother-in-law), by an all-white jury galvanized the Civil rights movement. A panel of historians following this film examined the historical roles white women played in white nationalist thinking from the 1700s to the present day and was moderated by former assistant to President Obama, Tina Tchen.

Also in 2019, MOWFF commissioned an original production of music and dramatic readings, written and composed by Nolan Williams, Jr. on the little known Contested Congressional Election of Annie Devine, Fannie Lou Hamer and Victoria Gray. It tells the story of the three aforenamed Civil Rights activists who contested the seating of the all-white, all male Mississippi Democratic delegation, all the way to the floor of Congress. Their challenge, supported by several white Members of Congress, caused a postponement of the Mississippi delegation's swearing-in, and prompted a year-long hearing in 1965 including depositions from Devine, Hamer and Gray. The production's libretto is transcribed from actual transcripts of those hearings taken from the Congressional Record.

=== 2020 ===
With the onset of the COVID-19 pandemic, in-person events were canceled. In its stead, a virtual festival was introduced and took place from September 20-19, 2020. At the 2020 Gala, Congressman John Lewis was posthumously honored with the March on Washington Lifetime Legacy award.

=== 2021 ===
In the spring of 2021, The March on Washington Film Festival offered a series of three workshops for student and emerging filmmakers. The first workshop was geared toward writers, the second for directors, and the last for producers. They featured presentations and panels of professionals in the film industry and one of the winning films from the Emerging and Student Competition.

=== 2022 ===
In 2022, the theme of The March on Washington Film Festival in 2022 was "Story, Stage & Screen" and it took place from September 28 - October 2, 2022. Signature events included a Film Screening of the Mississippi Defenders and Acting While Black with a talk back. The program concluded with a live performance of excerpts of a live performance of the American Prophet, fresh from its successful run at Arena Stage.

=== 2023 ===
The Theme of the 2023 March On Washington Film Festival was "Pulpits, Protest, & Power" and took place from September 24 - October 1, 2023 with the signature event of the same name that explored the role of the church in the past, and the implications for how we can think about movement building in the future with a special performance by gospel artist Yolanda Adams.

=== 2024 ===
In 2024, they unveiled March On! With a refreshed visual identity, redesigned website, and renewed mission, they evolved from a festival to a movement that bridges history and the future^{[32]}. They also partnered with Black Art In America (BAIA) and founder Najee Dorsey to showcase Black artists and their work through a series of virtual and in-person events;^{[33]} continued piloting their high school filmmaking curriculum, empowering students to pair equity-focused storytelling with film production.^{[34]}

The 2024 Festival focused on "WORD! Writers Who Move the Movement" where they celebrated the power of storytelling in many forms. Highlights included Supreme Court Justice Jackson’s conversation on becoming the first Black woman to serve on the nation’s highest court, a partnership with Penguin Random House exploring the world of publishing, and the James Baldwin Centennial Celebration.
