= National Defense Authorization Act for Fiscal Year 2013 =

United States military spending bill

The National Defense Authorization Act (NDAA) for Fiscal Year 2013 (short title) is a United States federal law which specifies the budget and expenditures of the United States Department of Defense for fiscal year 2013. The full title is An Act to Authorize Appropriations for fiscal year 2013 for military activities of the Department of Defense, for military construction, and for defense activities of the Department of Energy, to prescribe military personnel strengths for such fiscal year, and for other purposes. This law has been assigned the number PL 112–239.

== Information regarding the bill prior to bill enactment ==
So as to not have the Act run into the same legal trouble as the 2012 version did, the United States House of Representatives included section 1029, which affirmed the right of habeas corpus and the Constitutional right of due process for American citizens. However, there were criticisms of the Act, especially with regard to a "readiness" and funding for an attack on Iran. Criticism had also been voiced regarding section 1033 of the House bill version which would state that nothing in the Authorization for Use of Military Force (Public Law 107–40) or the National Defense Authorization Act for Fiscal Year 2012 (Public Law 112–81) shall be construed to deny the availability of the writ of habeas corpus in a court ordained or established by or under Article III of the Constitution for any person who is detained in the United States pursuant to the Authorization for Use of Military Force (Public Law 107–40).

== Bill enactment history, content and reactions ==
House vote by congressional district. Democratic nay Democratic yea Republican yea Republican nay Absent or no representative seated

Senate vote by state. Both yes One yes, one didn't vote One yes, one no One no, one didn't vote Both no

H Amdt 1127 Repeals Indefinite Military Detention Provisions House vote by congressional district. Democratic yea Democratic nay Republican yea Republican nay Absent or no representative seated

S Amdt 3018 - Prohibits the Indefinite Detention of Citizens and Lawful Permanent Residents Senate vote by state. Both yes One yes, one didn't vote One yes, one no One no, one didn't vote Both no

The NDAA for Fiscal Year 2013 passed the House Armed Services Committee 56–5 on May 10. The bill as reported to the House authorizes $554.2 billion in base Pentagon spending and $88.5 billion for overseas contingency operations (OCO). The bill passed the full House on May 18 by a vote of 299–120. The bill was approved by the Senate on December 4, 2012, by a vote of 98–0. The U.S. House of Representatives and the Senate passed the Conference Report on the National Defense Authorization Act for Fiscal Year 2013 in December 2012. The House passed it on December 20, 2012, with a vote of 315 yeas to 107 noes; the Senate passed it on December 21, 2012, with a vote of 81 yeas to 14 noes. President Barack Obama signed the 2013 National Defense Authorization Act on January 2, 2013.

The bill authorizes fiscal year 2013 appropriations for Department of Defense programs and military construction, Department of Energy national security programs, and Department of Transportation maritime security programs; authorizes recruitment and retention bonuses, special payments, and other authorities relating to the U.S. Armed Forces; and makes other modifications to national security, foreign affairs, and other related programs. The enacted act sets the U.S. Armed Forces' budget for the 2013 fiscal year to $633 billion. It also contains a prohibition on transferring Guantanamo detainees to the U.S and also includes the Afghan Women and Girl's Security Promotion Act.

In his signing statement to the Act Obama stated "Even though I support the vast majority of the provisions contained in [NDAA] I do not agree with them all. ... Though I continue to oppose certain sections of the Act, the need to renew critical defense authorities and funding was too great to ignore." Among these provisions are those that effectively thwart Obama's efforts to close the Guantanamo Bay detention camp and give military members the right to refuse to take certain actions that violate their conscience. "This law makes it harder for the President to fulfill his promise to close the Guantanamo detention facility, perpetuating a grave injustice against the detainees held without charge or fair trial," said Frank Jannuzi, Deputy Executive Director of Amnesty International USA. "Solutions for ending human rights violations, not excuses, must be found."

=== Feinstein–Lee Amendment ===
The NDAA, an otherwise mundane annual bill that lays out the use of funds for the Department of Defense, has come under attack during the Obama administration for the introduction of a provision in 2012 that allows the military to detain United States citizens indefinitely without charge or trial for mere suspicions of ties to terrorism.

On December 4, 2012, the U.S. Senate unanimously passed the bill 98–0 and added in Section 1033 the Feinstein–Lee NDAA Amendment which states: "An authorization to use military force, a declaration of war, or any similar authority shall not authorize the detention without charge or trial of a citizen or lawful permanent resident of the United States apprehended in the United States, unless an Act of Congress expressly authorizes such detention." Civil liberties group are concerned with this amendment because they think anyone on American soil should be given a trial if accused of a crime, given that the U.S. Constitution protects "persons," rather than "citizens." The Feinstein–Lee Amendment is "inconsistent with the constitutional principle that basic due process applies to everyone in the US," said American Civil Liberties Union (ACLU) legislative counsel Chris Anders. Anders was also worried that the amendment could be construed to actually imply that the U.S. government has the constitutional authority for indefinite detention without charge and trial. "Moreover, we are very concerned that the Feinstein amendment implicitly authorizes domestic military detention. By seeking to protect only United States citizens and legal permanent residents, the amendment could be read to imply that indefinite military detention of any other persons apprehended within the United States was authorized in 2001 and was lawful," the ACLU wrote, referring to the Authorization for Use of Military Force, the founding document of the "war on terror" that was passed the week after the September 11 attacks. "In addition, the clause 'unless an Act of Congress expressly authorizes such detention' could be read to imply that there are no constitutional obstacles to Congress enacting a statute that would authorize the domestic military detention of any person in the United States," the ACLU wrote.

A Congressional conference committee tasked with merging the House and Senate versions of the 2013 National Defense Authorization Act (NDAA) decided on December 18, 2012, to drop the Feinstein–Lee provision, which would have explicitly barred the military from holding American citizens and permanent residents in indefinite detention without trial as terrorism suspects. There was no reason given for this. Instead, the following replacement provivison was added:

Nothing in the Authorization for Use of Military Force (Public Law 107–40; 50 U.S.C. 1541) or the National Defense Authorization Act for Fiscal Year 2012 (Public Law 112–81) shall be construed to deny the availability of the writ of habeas corpus or to deny any Constitutional rights in a court ordained or established by or under Article III of the Constitution to any person inside the United States who would be entitled to the availability of such writ or to such rights in the absence of such laws.

The Huffington Post noted that the replacement version appeared to do little, because the Supreme Court has already declared that the writ of habeas corpus, i.e. the constitutional requirement that someone be presented to a judge, applies to all people. This was echoed from the civil liberties groups. "This language doesn't do anything of substance," said Raha Wala, a lawyer in the law and national security program of Human Rights First. "It doesn't ban indefinite detention within the United States or change anything about existing law." Chris Anders from the American Civil Liberties Union called the language on indefinite detention of Americans "completely meaningless" and added there's no doubt that habeas rights are available to anyone who's detained in the U.S.

Bruce Afran, a lawyer for the group of journalists and activists suing the U.S. government over the 2012 NDAA, explained that the above quoted provision gives U.S. citizens a right to go to civilian (i.e. Article III) court based on "any [applicable] constitutional rights," but since there are no rules in place to exercise this right, detained U.S. citizens currently have no way to gain access to lawyers, family or the court itself once they are detained within the military. Afran added that the new statute actually states that persons lawfully in the U.S. can be detained under the Authorization for the Use of Military Force [AUMF], while the original statute from the 2012 NDAA which he is fighting never went that far. Afran concluded: "Therefore, under the guise of supposedly adding protection to Americans, the new statute actually expands the AUMF to civilians in the U.S."

=== Smith–Mundt Modernization Act of 2012 ===
The Smith–Mundt Modernization Act of 2012 was introduced by U.S. Congressman Mac Thornberry on May 10, 2012, in the House of Representatives. U.S. Congressman Adam Smith was a Co-Sponsor. The bill's purpose is "to authorize the domestic dissemination of information and material about the United States intended primarily for foreign audiences." The act was added to the 2013 NDAA bill as section of 1078 to amend certain passages of Smith–Mundt Act of 1948 and Foreign Relations Authorization Act of 1987. The Smith–Mundt Modernization Act of 2012 passed Congress as part of the NDAA 2013 on December 28, 2012. Amendments made to the Smith–Mundt Act of 1948 and Foreign Relations Authorization Act of 1987 allow for materials produced by the State Department and the Broadcasting Board of Governors (BBG) to be released within US borders. U.S. Representative Adam Smith stated with respect to the bill's purpose that al-Qaeda was infiltrating the Internet in order to promote anti-Americanism and that with passage of the Smith–Mundt Modernization Act of 2012 the U.S. government would be able disseminate public diplomacy information by the State Department to counter that in the Arabic language abroad.

Several news outlets reported that the 2013 NDAA overturned a 64-year ban on the domestic dissemination of propaganda (described as "public diplomacy information") produced for foreign audiences, effectively eliminating the distinction between foreign and domestic audiences. The news website BuzzFeed News for example quoted an unnamed source saying the Smith–Mundt Modernization Act of 2012 would allow "U.S. propaganda intended to influence foreign audiences to be used on the domestic population."

The Media and Outreach Coordinator for the U.S. State Department's Bureau of African Affairs, Gregory L. Garland, noted that the United States shoots itself in the foot by the release prohibition of materials produced by the State Department and the BBG within US borders and by preaching freedom of the press abroad while practicing censorship at home. He argued against a complete repeal of the Smith–Mundt Act of 1948 stating that the law "creates a statutory firewall between resources intended for foreign audiences and those used domestically. Tear down that firewall, and it will be a matter of time before resources and personnel who focus on talking about America overseas are diverted in favor of domestic "public affairs," the short-term political imperative of any administration." An unnamed Pentagon official who was concerned about the 2012 law version stated: "It removes the protection for Americans. It removes oversight from the people who want to put out this information. There are no checks and balances. No one knows if the information is accurate, partially accurate, or entirely false." The monthly magazine The Atlantic echoed those concerns by pointing out to two USA Today journalists who became target of a smear and propaganda campaign after they reported that the U.S. military "information operations" program spent millions of U.S. dollars in marketing campaigns in Afghanistan and Iraq criticized as ineffective and poorly monitored. As it turned out, Camille Chidiac, who executed the marketing campaigns in Iraq and Afghanistan, admitted to be a part of the smear and propaganda campaign against the USA Today reporters.

== See also ==
- National Defense Authorization Act
- National Defense Authorization Act for Fiscal Year 2012
- National Defense Authorization Act for Fiscal Year 2014
