= Palmers Crossing =

Palmers Crossing is an area south of Hattiesburg, Mississippi that has been home to a largely African American community. The Mississippi Department of Archives and History sponsored a presentation on it by Sean O'Farrell August 14, 2024. It has a community center that is a stop on the "Freedom Trail" commemorating 1960s civil rights sites.

Civil rights and Freedom School activities were photographed in the area in 1964.

In 2013, the community sued Hattiesburg over a lack of services since it was annexed by the city.

In 2021 a splash pad opened in the community. In 2025, Pearl River Community College students created a mural honoring the area's history titled "Freedom Summer: Honoring History and Hope in Palmer’s Crossing".

The area has been home to Charles Porter Lounge, the High Hat Club, Roger Lees, Carpenters Corner, Joe Woolard's store, and Earl Travillion School.

== Notable residents ==
- Victoria Gray Adams
- Milton Barnes
- Jesse L. Brown
- Charlie Hayes
- Dorie Ladner
- Joyce Ladner
