= Southern Poverty Law Center =

American civil rights organization

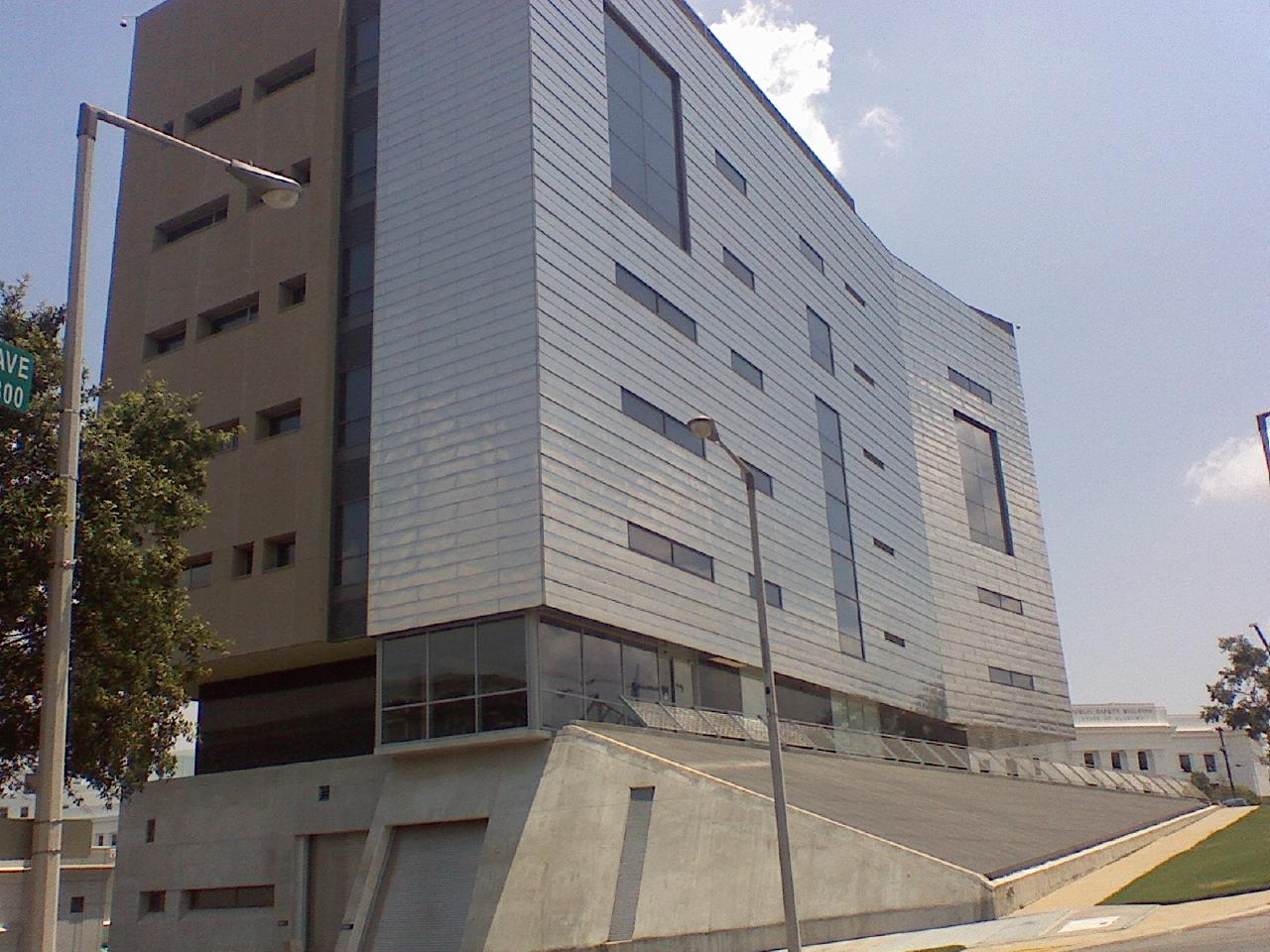
- Founded: August 1971; 55 years ago
- Founders: Morris Dees; Joseph J. Levin Jr.; Julian Bond
- Type: Public-interest law firm; Civil rights advocacy organization
- Tax ID no.: 63-0598743 (EIN)
- Legal status: 501(c)(3)
- Purpose: Hate groups; Racism; Civil rights
- Location: Montgomery, Alabama, U.S.
- Coordinates: 32°22′36″N 86°18′12″W
- Region served: United States
- Product: Legal representation; Educational materials
- Key people: Bryan Fair (interim CEO); Karen Baynes-Dunning (board chair)
- Revenue: $204.8 million (2024)
- Expenses: $127,7 million (2024)
- Endowment: $738.4 million (2024)
- Website: splcenter.org

The Southern Poverty Law Center (SPLC) is an American 501(c)(3) nonprofit legal advocacy organization specializing in civil rights and public interest litigation. Based in Montgomery, Alabama, it is known for its legal cases against white supremacist groups, for its classification of hate groups and other extremist organizations, and for promoting anti-bias education. The SPLC was founded by Morris Dees, Joseph J. Levin Jr., and Julian Bond in 1971 as a civil rights legal clinic in Montgomery.

In 1980, the SPLC began a strategy of filing civil suits against the Ku Klux Klan for monetary damages on behalf of the victims of its violence. The SPLC also became involved in other civil rights causes, including cases to challenge what it sees as institutional racial segregation and discrimination, inhumane and unconstitutional conditions in prisons and detention centers, discrimination based on sexual orientation, mistreatment of illegal immigrants, and the unconstitutional mixing of church and state. The SPLC previously provided information about hate groups to the Federal Bureau of Investigation (FBI) and other law enforcement agencies.

Since the 2000s, the SPLC's classification and listings of hate groups and anti-government extremists have been widely relied upon by academic and media sources. The SPLC's listings have also been criticized. Critics argue some of the SPLC's listings are overbroad, politically motivated, or unwarranted. In October 2025, FBI director Kash Patel cut the agency's ties with the SPLC after a push to do so from right-wing allies of Republican president Donald Trump, and in April 2026, a federal grand jury indicted the SPLC for wire fraud, false statements to federally insured banks and conspiracy to commit money laundering.

== History ==
The Southern Poverty Law Center was founded by civil rights lawyers Morris Dees and Joseph J. Levin Jr. in August 1971 as a legal clinic originally focused on issues such as fighting poverty, racial discrimination and the death penalty in the US. Dees asked civil rights leader Julian Bond to serve as president, a largely honorary position; he resigned in 1979 but remained on the board of directors until his death in 2015.

In 1979, Dees and the SPLC began filing civil lawsuits against Ku Klux Klan chapters and similar organizations for monetary damages on behalf of their victims. The favorable verdicts from these suits served to bankrupt the KKK and other targeted organizations. According to a 1996 article in The New York Times, Dees and the SPLC "have been credited with devising innovative legal ways to cripple hate groups, including seizing their assets." Some civil libertarians have said that the SPLC's tactics chill free speech and set legal precedents that could be applied against activist groups which are not hate groups.

In 1981, the center began its Klanwatch project to monitor the activities of the KKK. That project, later called Hatewatch, expanded to include seven other types of hate organizations.

In 1986, the entire legal staff of the SPLC, excluding Dees, resigned, as the organization shifted from traditional civil rights work toward fighting right-wing extremism. In 1989, the center unveiled its Civil Rights Memorial, which was designed by Maya Lin.

The center's "Teaching Tolerance" project was initiated in 1991.

In 1995, the Montgomery Advertiser won a Pulitzer Prize recognition for work that probed management self-interest, questionable practices, and employee racial discrimination allegations in the SPLC.

In 2008, the SPLC and Dees were featured on National Geographic's Inside American Terror explaining their litigation strategy against the Ku Klux Klan.

In 2011, the SPLC was "involved in high-profile state fights", including the battle over Georgia House Bill 87 (HB 87). The SPLC joined with the ACLU, the Asian Law Caucus, and the National Immigration Law Center in June 2011 to file a lawsuit challenging HB 87, which resulted in a 2013 permanent injunction blocking multiple provisions of the law.

In 2013, "Teaching Tolerance" was cited as "one of the most widely read periodicals dedicated to diversity and social justice in education."

In 2016, the SPLC's "ranks swelled" and its "endowment surged" after U.S. President Donald Trump was elected, resulting in the hiring of 200 new employees.

In 2018, the SPLC filed suits related to the conditions of incarceration for adults and juveniles.

In March 2019, Dees was fired. In April, Karen Baynes-Dunning was named as interim president and CEO. After a "tumultuous year", in mid-December 2019, staff at the SPLC voted to unionize, with 142 in favor and 45 against. The SPLC had "long been dogged by accusations of internal discrimination against minority employees, particularly in the area of promotions." A new president and CEO, Margaret Huang, was named in early February 2020.

The SPLC and the ACLU have been involved in "battles over the treatment of inmates in [Alabama's] prisons". They also made an emergency request in April 2020 for the "release of tens of thousands of people in ICE custody" if ICE could not provide protection for vulnerable inmates during the COVID-19 pandemic. The request was filed as part of an existing class-action lawsuit regarding conditions in ICE facilities.

In June 2024, 80 people, representing 25% of the SPLC's workforce, were laid off. In September 2024, 92% of remaining SPLC staffers supported a no-confidence motion against Huang. The workers demanded a reversal of the mass layoff, which they characterized as a union-busting tactic, and the hiring of a new CEO. The chair of the union's bargaining committee called the layoffs "sloppy, dispassionate, inhumane. It has been the absolute opposite of what the organization says they stand for and absolute chaos since then." SPLC leadership dismissed the union's request to remove Huang as CEO. Huang resigned as CEO in July 2025 and was replaced by interim CEO Bryan Fair.

=== Leadership upheaval amid harassment allegations ===
In March 2019, the SPLC fired founder Morris Dees for undisclosed reasons and removed his profile from the SPLC website. In a statement regarding the firing, the SPLC announced it would be bringing in an "outside organization to conduct a comprehensive assessment of our internal climate and workplace practices."

Following the dismissal, a letter signed by two dozen SPLC employees was sent to management, expressing concern that "allegations of mistreatment, sexual harassment, gender discrimination, and racism threaten the moral authority of this organization and our integrity along with it." One former employee wrote that the "unchecked power of lavishly compensated white men at the top" of the SPLC contributed to a culture which made black and female employees the targets of harassment.

A week later, President Richard Cohen and legal director Rhonda Brownstein announced their resignations amid the internal upheaval. The associate legal director Meredith Horton quit, alleging concerns regarding workplace culture. Cohen said, "Whatever problems exist at the SPLC happened on my watch, so I take responsibility for them."

== Administration ==
In early February 2020, Margaret Huang, who was formerly the chief executive at Amnesty International USA, was named as president and CEO of the SPLC. Huang replaced Karen Baynes-Dunning, a former juvenile court judge, who had served as interim president and CEO since April 2019, after founder Morris Dees was fired in March 2019. The SPLC had appointed Tina Tchen, a former chief of staff for former first lady Michelle Obama, to review and investigate any issues with the organization's workplace environment related to Dees' firing. Huang resigned in July 2025 and was replaced by interim CEO Bryan Fair.

== Fundraising and finances ==
The SPLC's activities, including litigation, are supported by fundraising efforts, and it does not accept any fees or share in legal judgments awarded to clients it represents in court. Starting in 1974, the SPLC set aside money for its endowment stating that it was "convinced that the day [would] come when non-profit groups [would] no longer be able to rely on support through mail because of posting and printing costs".

The Los Angeles Times reported that by 2017, the SPLC's financial resources "nearly totaled half a billion dollars in assets". In 2023, its endowment was $749 million, its revenue was $170 million, and its expenses totaled $122 million. In 2024, revenue was $204.8 million and expenses were $127.7 million and the group's endowment was $738.4 million.

Prior to his departure in 2019, Dees' role at the center was focused on "donor relations" and "expanding the center's financial resources."

The SPLC's related 501(c)(4) organization, the SPLC Action Fund, formed two political action committees in 2022: New Southern Leaders federal PAC and the New Southern Majority federal Super PAC. The New Southern Leaders PAC spent more than $21,000 in 2023-24, most going to the SPLC Action Fund, which spent more than $1,000,000 in independent expenditures in the 2019-20 election cycle.PAC Profile: SPLC Action Fund

=== Charity ratings ===
As of 2023, based on figures from Fiscal Year 2022, Charity Navigator rated the SPLC four out of four stars, with an overall score of 99/100 for "Accountability & Finance". The missing point was due to SPLC failing to post a "Donor Privacy Policy" on its website. SPLC's 2022 revenue totaled $140,350,982, and its expenses amounted to $111,043,025. According to Charity Navigator's Historical Ratings, SPLC has earned four-star ratings since 2019.

As of 2023, SPLC has earned the GuideStar Gold Seal of Transparency, which is given to organizations that voluntarily share their financials and "highlight their commitment to inclusivity to gain funders' trust and support." SPLC previously earned GuideStar's Platinum Seal of Transparency, but did not retain it.

In 2023, CharityWatch initially gave SPLC a grade of B based on its 2021 financials. CharityWatch, however, downgrades all charities that "hoard" donations, which per CharityWatch's definition occurs whenever "a charity's available assets in reserve exceeds three years' worth its annual budget." In particular, CharityWatch automatically "downgrades to an F rating any charity holding available assets in reserve equal to 5 years or more of its annual budget." In accordance with this policy, on 3 February 2023 CharityWatch downgraded SPLC from B to F because it had 7.3 years of available assets in reserve, it spent 68% of its funds on programs, and it cost $20 to raise $100.

The SPLC declined to submit information or be evaluated by the Charity Accountability section of the Better Business Bureau.

== Criminal attacks and plots against the SPLC ==
In July 1983, the SPLC headquarters was firebombed, destroying the building and records. In February 1985, Klansmen Joe M. Garner and Roy T. Downs Jr., along with Klan sympathizer Charles Bailey, pleaded guilty to conspiring to intimidate, oppress and threaten members of black organizations represented by SPLC. The SPLC built a new headquarters building from 1999 to 2001.

In 1984, Morris Dees became an assassination target of the Order, a revolutionary white supremacist group. By 2007, according to Dees, more than 30 people had been jailed in connection with plots to kill him or to blow up SPLC offices.

In 1995, four men were indicted for planning to blow up the SPLC headquarters. In May 1998, three white supremacists were arrested for planning a nationwide campaign of assassinations and bombings targeting Morris Dees and his Southern Poverty Law Center in Alabama, as well as the Simon Wiesenthal Center in Los Angeles, the Anti-Defamation League in New York, an undisclosed federal judge in Illinois and a black radio show host in Missouri.

== Notable SPLC civil cases on behalf of clients ==
The Southern Poverty Law Center has initiated a number of civil cases seeking injunctive relief and monetary awards on behalf of its clients. The SPLC has said it does not accept any portion of monetary judgments.

=== Sims v. Amos (1974) ===
An early SPLC case was Sims v. Amos (consolidated with Nixon v. Brewer) in which the U.S. District Court for the Middle of Alabama ordered the state legislature to reapportion its election system. The result of the decision, which the U.S. Supreme Court affirmed, was that fifteen black legislators were elected in 1974.

=== Brown v. Invisible Empire, KKK (1980) ===
In 1979, the Klan began a summer of attacks against civil rights groups, beginning in Alabama. In Decatur, Alabama, Klan members clashed with a group of civil rights marchers. There were a hundred Klan members carrying "bats, ax handles and guns". A black woman, Bernice Brown, was shot and other marchers were violently attacked. In Brown v. Invisible Empire, Knights of the Ku Klux Klan, filed in 1980 in the USDC Northern District of Alabama, the SPLC sued the Invisible Empire, Knights of the Ku Klux Klan on behalf of plaintiffs, Brown and other black marchers. The civil suit was settled in 1990 and "required Klansmen to pay damages, perform community service, and refrain from white supremacist activity." Chalmers wrote in Backfire, that the Klan had been in serious decline since the end of the 1970s. He described the "Klan summer of 1979", as a "catastrophe" for the Klan, due to the SPLC's newly established Klanwatch, which became a "powerful weapon" that "tracked and litigated" the Klan. According to Chalmers, "[b]eginning with the Decatur street confrontation, the SPLC's Klanwatch began suing various Klans in federal court for civil rights violations", and as a result, the Klan lost credibility and its resources were depleted. (Note: In his 2003 publication, Chalmers warned that the Klan had given way to the next generation of hate groups.) As a result of the SPLC, the FBI reopened their case against the Klan, and "nine Klansmen were eventually convicted of criminal charges" related to the Decatur confrontation of 1979.

=== Vietnamese fishermen (1981) ===
In 1981, the SPLC took Ku Klux Klan leader Louis Beam's Klan-associated militia, the Texas Emergency Reserve (TER), to court to stop racial harassment and intimidation of Vietnamese shrimpers in and around Galveston Bay. The Klan's actions against approximately 100 Vietnamese shrimpers in the area included a cross burning, sniper fire aimed at them, and arsonists burning their boats.

In May 1981, U.S. District Court judge Gabrielle Kirk McDonald issued a preliminary injunction against the Klan, requiring them to cease intimidating, threatening, or harassing the Vietnamese. McDonald eventually found the TER and Beam liable for tortious interference, violations of the Sherman Antitrust Act, and of various civil rights statutes and thus permanently enjoined them against violence, threatening behavior, and other harassment of the Vietnamese shrimpers. The SPLC also uncovered an obscure Texas law "that forbade private armies in that state". McDonald found that Beam's organization violated it and hence ordered the TER to close its military training camp.

=== Person v. Carolina Knights of the Ku Klux Klan (1982) ===
In 1982, armed members of the Carolina Knights of the Ku Klux Klan terrorized Bobby Person, a black prison guard, and members of his family. They harassed and threatened others, including a white woman who had befriended blacks. In 1984, Person became the lead plaintiff in Person v. Carolina Knights of the Ku Klux Klan, a lawsuit brought by the SPLC in the United States District Court for the Eastern District of North Carolina. The harassment and threats continued during litigation and the court issued an order prohibiting any person from interfering with others inside the courthouse. In January 1985, the court issued a consent order that prohibited the group's "Grand Dragon", Frazier Glenn Miller Jr., and his followers from operating a paramilitary organization, holding parades in black neighborhoods, and from harassing, threatening or harming any black person or white persons who associated with black persons. Subsequently, the court dismissed the plaintiffs' claim for damages.

Within a year, the court found Miller and his followers, now calling themselves the White Patriot Party, in criminal contempt for violating the consent order. Miller was sentenced to six months in prison followed by a three-year probationary period, during which he was banned from associating with members of any racist group such as the White Patriot Party. Miller refused to obey the terms of his probation. He made underground "declarations of war" against Jews and the federal government before being arrested again. Found guilty of weapons violations, he went to federal prison for three years.

=== United Klans of America ===
In 1987, Dees and Michael Figures won a case against the United Klans of America for the lynching of Michael Donald, a black teenager in Mobile, Alabama. The SPLC used an unprecedented legal strategy of holding an organization responsible for the crimes of individual members to help produce a $7 million judgment for the victim's mother. The verdict forced United Klans of America into bankruptcy. Its national headquarters was sold for approximately $52,000 to help satisfy the judgment.

In 1987, five members of a Klan offshoot, the White Patriot Party, were indicted for stealing military weaponry and plotting to kill Dees. The SPLC has since successfully used this precedent to force numerous Ku Klux Klan and other hate groups into bankruptcy.

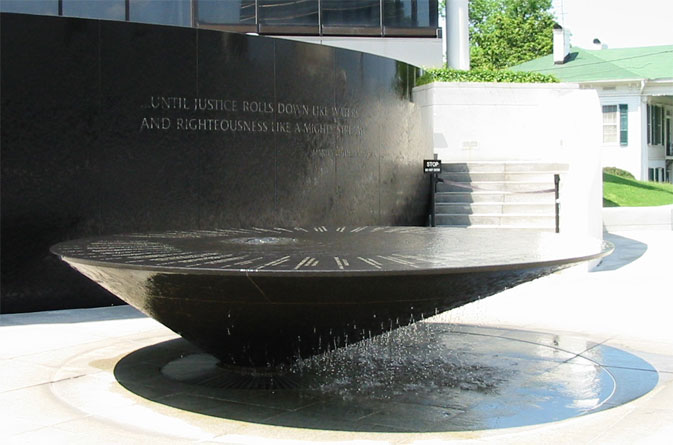
The Civil Rights Memorial in Montgomery

=== White Aryan Resistance ===
On November 13, 1988, in Portland, Oregon, three white supremacist members of East Side White Pride and White Aryan Resistance (WAR) fatally assaulted Mulugeta Seraw, an Ethiopian man who came to the United States to attend college. In October 1990, the SPLC won a civil case on behalf of Seraw's family against WAR's operator Tom Metzger and his son, John, for a total of $12.5 million. The Metzgers declared bankruptcy, and WAR went out of business. The cost of work for the trial was absorbed by the Anti-Defamation League (ADL) as well as the SPLC. As of August 2007, Metzger still makes payments to Seraw's family.

=== Church of the Creator ===
In May 1991, Harold Mansfield, a black U.S. Navy war veteran, was murdered by George Loeb, a member of the neo-Nazi "Church of the Creator" (now called the Creativity Movement). SPLC represented the victim's family in a civil case and won a judgment of $1 million from the church in March 1994. The church transferred ownership to William Pierce, head of the National Alliance, to avoid paying money to Mansfield's heirs. The SPLC filed suit against Pierce for his role in the fraudulent scheme and won an $85,000 judgment against him in 1995. The amount was upheld on appeal and the money was collected prior to Pierce's death in 2002.

=== Christian Knights of the KKK ===
The SPLC won a $37.8 million verdict on behalf of Macedonia Baptist Church, a 100-year-old black church in Manning, South Carolina, against two Ku Klux Klan chapters and five Klansmen (Christian Knights of the Ku Klux Klan and Invisible Empire, Inc.) in July 1998. The money was awarded stemming from arson convictions; these Klan units burned down the historic black church in 1995. Morris Dees told the press, "If we put the Christian Knights out of business, what's that worth? We don't look at what we can collect. It's what the jury thinks this egregious conduct is worth that matters, along with the message it sends." According to The Washington Post the amount is the "largest-ever civil award for damages in a hate crime case."

=== Aryan Nations ===
In September 2000, the SPLC won a $6.3 million judgment against Aryan Nations via an Idaho jury who awarded punitive and compensatory damages to a woman and her son who were attacked by Aryan Nations guards. The lawsuit stemmed from the July 1998 attack when security guards at Aryan Nations compound near Hayden Lake in northern Idaho, shot at Victoria Keenan and her son. Bullets struck their car several times, causing the car to crash. An Aryan Nations member held the Keenans at gunpoint. As a result of the judgment, Richard Butler turned over the 20-acre (81,000 m^{2}) compound to the Keenans, who sold the property to a philanthropist. He donated the land to North Idaho College, which designated the area as a "peace park".

=== Ten Commandments monument ===
In 2002, the SPLC and the American Civil Liberties Union filed suit (Glassroth v. Moore) against Alabama Supreme Court Chief Justice Roy Moore for placing a display of the Ten Commandments in the rotunda of the Alabama Judicial Building. Moore, who had final authority over what decorations were to be placed in the Alabama State Judicial Building's Rotunda, had installed a 5,280 pound (2,400 kg) granite block, three feet wide by three feet deep by four feet tall, of the Ten Commandments late at night without the knowledge of any other court justice. After defying several court rulings, Moore was eventually removed from the court and the Supreme Court justices had the monument removed from the building.

=== Leiva v. Ranch Rescue ===
In 2003, the SPLC, the Mexican American Legal Defense and Educational Fund, and local attorneys filed a civil suit, Leiva v. Ranch Rescue, in Jim Hogg County, Texas, against Ranch Rescue, a vigilante paramilitary group and several of its associates, seeking damages for assault and illegal detention of two illegal immigrants caught near the U.S.-Mexico border. In April 2005, SPLC obtained judgments totaling $1 million against Casey James Nethercott, who was then Ranch Rescue's leader and the owner of an Arizona ranch, Camp Thunderbird, Joe Sutton, who owned the Hebbronville ranch on which two illegal immigrants has been caught trespassing on March 18, 2003, and Jack Foote, the founder of Ranch Rescue. Sutton, who had recruited Ranch Rescue to patrol the U.S.-Mexico border region near his Hebbronville ranch, settled with an $100,000 out-of-court settlement. According to the New York Times, since neither Nethercott or Foote defended themselves, the "judge issued default judgments of $850,000 against Mr. Nethercott and $500,000 against Mr. Foote. Neither men had "substantial assets" so Nethercott's 70-acre (280,000 m^{2}) ranch—Camp Thunderbird—which had also served as Ranch Rescue's headquarters—was seized to pay the judgment and surrendered to the two illegal immigrants from El Salvador, Edwin Alfredo Mancía Gonzáles and Fátima del Socorro Leiva Medina. SPLC staff worked also with Texas prosecutors to obtain a conviction against Nethercott for possession of a gun, which was illegal for a felon. Nethercott had served time in California for assault previously. As a result, he was sentenced to serve a five-year sentence in a Texas prison.

=== Billy Ray Johnson ===
The SPLC brought a civil suit on behalf of Billy Ray Johnson, a black, mentally disabled man, who was severely beaten by four white males in Texas and left bleeding in a ditch, suffering permanent injuries. In 2007, Johnson was awarded $9 million in damages by a Linden, Texas jury. At a criminal trial, the four men were convicted of assault and received sentences of 30 to 60 days in county jail.

=== Imperial Klans of America ===
In November 2008, the SPLC's case against the Imperial Klans of America (IKA), the nation's second-largest Klan organization, went to trial in Meade County, Kentucky. The SPLC had filed suit for damages in July 2007 on behalf of Jordan Gruver and his mother against the IKA in Kentucky. In July 2006, five Klan members went to the Meade County Fairgrounds in Brandenburg, Kentucky, "to hand out business cards and flyers advertising a 'white-only' IKA function". Two members of the Klan started calling Gruver, a 16-year-old boy of Panamanian descent, a "spic". Subsequently, the boy, (5 feet 3 inches (1.60 m) and weighing 150 pounds (68 kg)) was beaten and kicked by the Klansmen (one of whom was 6 feet 5 inches (1.96 m) and 300 pounds (140 kg)). As a result, the victim received "two cracked ribs, a broken left forearm, multiple cuts and bruises and jaw injuries requiring extensive dental repair."

In a related criminal case in February 2007, Jarred Hensley and Andrew Watkins were sentenced to three years in prison for beating Gruver. On November 14, 2008, an all-white jury of seven men and seven women awarded $1.5 million in compensatory damages and $1 million in punitive damages to the plaintiff against Ron Edwards, Imperial Wizard of the group, and Jarred Hensley, who participated in the attack.

=== Mississippi correctional institutions ===
Together with the ACLU National Prison Project, the SPLC filed a class-action suit in November 2010 against the owner/operators of the private Walnut Grove Youth Correctional Facility in Leake County, Mississippi, and the Mississippi Department of Corrections (MDC). They charged that conditions, including under-staffing and neglect of medical care, produced numerous and repeated abuses of youthful prisoners, high rates of violence and injury, and that one prisoner suffered brain damage because of inmate-on-inmate attacks. A federal civil rights investigation was undertaken by the United States Department of Justice. In settling the suit, Mississippi ended its contract with GEO Group in 2012. Additionally, under the court decree, the MDC moved the youthful offenders to state-run units. In 2012, Mississippi opened a new youthful offender unit at the Central Mississippi Correctional Facility in Rankin County. The state also agreed to not subject youthful offenders to solitary confinement and a court monitor conducted regular reviews of conditions at the facility.

Also with the ACLU Prison Project, the SPLC filed a class-action suit in May 2013 against Management and Training Corporation (MTC), the for-profit operator of the private East Mississippi Correctional Facility, and the MDC. Management and Training Corporation had been awarded a contract for this and two other facilities in Mississippi in 2012 following the removal of GEO Group. The suit charged failure of MTC to make needed improvements, and to maintain proper conditions and treatment for this special needs population of prisoners. In 2015 the court granted the plaintiffs' motion for class certification.

=== Polk County, Florida sheriff ===
In 2012, the SPLC initiated a class action federal lawsuit against the Polk County, Florida sheriff, Grady Judd, alleging that seven juveniles confined by the sheriff were suffering in improper conditions. U.S. district court judge Steven D. Merryday found in favor of Judd, who said the SPLC's allegations "were not supported by the facts or court precedence [sic]." The judge wrote that "the conditions of juvenile detention at (Central County Jail) are not consistent with (Southern Poverty's) dark, grim, and condemning portrayal." While the county sheriff's department did not recover an estimated $1 million in attorney's fees defending the case, Judge Merryday did award $103,000 in court costs to Polk County.

=== Andrew Anglin and The Daily Stormer ===
In April 2017, the SPLC filed a federal lawsuit on behalf of Tanya Gersh, accusing Andrew Anglin, publisher of the white supremacist website The Daily Stormer, of instigating an anti-Semitic harassment campaign against Gersh, a Whitefish, Montana, real estate agent. In July 2019, a judge issued a 14 million dollar default judgment against Anglin, who is in hiding and has refused to appear in court.

== Lawsuits against and criticism of the SPLC ==
In October 2014, the SPLC added Ben Carson to its extremist watch list, citing his association with groups it considers extreme, and his "linking of gays with pedophiles". Following criticism, the SPLC concluded its profile of Carson did not meet its standards, removed his listing, and apologized to him in February 2015.

In October 2016, the SPLC published its "Field Guide to Anti-Muslim Extremists", which listed the British activist Maajid Nawaz and a nonprofit group he founded, the Quilliam Foundation. Nawaz, who identifies as a "liberal, reform Muslim", denounced the listing as a "smear", saying that the SPLC listing had made him a target of jihadists. In June 2018, the SPLC issued an apology, stating:

Given our understanding of the views of Mr. Nawaz and Quilliam, it was our opinion at the time that the Field Guide was published that their inclusion was warranted. But after getting a deeper understanding of their views and after hearing from others for whom we have great respect, we realize that we were simply wrong to have included Mr. Nawaz and Quilliam in the Field Guide in the first place.

Along with the apology, the SPLC paid US$3.375 million to Nawaz and the Quilliam Foundation in a settlement. Nawaz said about the settlement that Quilliam "will continue to combat extremists by defying Muslim stereotypes, calling out fundamentalism in our own communities, and speaking out against anti-Muslim hate." The SPLC ultimately removed the Field Guide from its website.

In August 2017, a defamation lawsuit was filed against the SPLC by the D. James Kennedy Ministries for describing it as an "active hate group" because of their views on LGBT rights. The SPLC lists D. James Kennedy Ministries and its predecessor, Truth in Action, as anti-LGBT hate groups because of what the SPLC describes as the group's history of spreading homophobic propaganda, including D. James Kennedy's false statement that "homosexuals prey on adolescent boys", and false claims about the transmission of AIDS. On February 21, 2018, a federal magistrate judge recommended that the suit be dismissed with prejudice, concluding that D. James Kennedy Ministries could not show that it had been libeled. On September 19, 2019, the lawsuit was dismissed by Judge Myron H. Thompson, who ruled that the "SPLC's labeling of the group as [a hate group] is protected by the First Amendment."

In March 2018, several journalists, including Max Blumenthal, were mentioned in an article by Alexander Reid Ross which the SPLC retracted after receiving complaints from those journalists that the article falsely portrayed them as "white supremacists, fascists, anti-Semites, and engaging in a conspiracy with the Putin regime to promote such views"; the center's letter explaining its retraction of the article apologizing to Blumenthal and the other journalists who believed they had been falsely portrayed. The SPLC was criticized for taking down this article and was accused of caving in to pressure. The article argued that the dissemination of conspiracy theories around such issues as the Syrian Civil War (about the White Helmets and child refugees) was intended to co-opt leftist anti-imperialism in the service of a fascist agenda. Subsequently, the SPLC retracted two other articles written by Ross on the topic of Russian campaigns to influence Western public opinion.

In 2019, the Center for Immigration Studies (CIS) sued the SPLC for designating the CIS as a hate group, claiming it constituted fraud under the Racketeer Influenced and Corrupt Organizations Act (RICO). The SPLC defended its decision and said the group "richly deserved" the designation. Cornell law professor William A. Jacobson, a longtime critic of the SPLC, criticized the listing of the CIS as "pos[ing] a danger of being exploited as an excuse to silence speech and to skew political debate." The lawsuit was dismissed in September 2019 for failure to state a claim; Judge Amy Berman Jackson ruled that the CIS could not show any violations of the RICO statute.

In February 2019, several months after resigning as chairman of the Proud Boys, Gavin McInnes filed a defamation lawsuit against the SPLC. The lawsuit was filed in federal court in Alabama over the SPLC's designation of the Proud Boys as a "general hate" group. The SPLC took the lawsuit "as a compliment" and an indication that "we're doing our job." On its website, SPLC said that "McInnes plays a duplicitous rhetorical game: rejecting white nationalism and, in particular, the term 'alt-right' while espousing some of its central tenets" and that the group's "rank-and-file [members] and leaders regularly spout white nationalist memes and maintain affiliations with known extremists. They are known for anti-Muslim and misogynistic rhetoric. Proud Boys have appeared alongside other hate groups at extremist gatherings like the Unite the Right rally in Charlottesville." In addition to defamation, McInnes claimed tortious interference with economic advantage, "false light invasion of privacy" and "aiding and abetting employment discrimination". The day after filing the suit, McInnes announced that he had been re-hired by the Canadian far-right media group The Rebel Media. The SPLC filed a motion to dismiss the lawsuit in July 2019.

In May 2026, Florida opened a civil investigation into the SPLC over alleged "deceptive and unfair practices in raising charitable funds".

=== FBI Richmond Catholic memo ===
In January 2023, the FBI Richmond Field Office produced an internal intelligence memo identifying "radical traditionalist Catholics" as potential domestic violent extremists, relying on the Southern Poverty Law Center's designation of nine "radical traditionalist Catholic hate groups" as a key source. Twenty state attorneys general criticized the FBI for citing the SPLC "apparently without any independent vetting." Attorney General Merrick Garland testified that the FBI "should not be relying on any single organization without doing its own work." The memo's authors told DOJ investigators they knew the SPLC and other sources had political bias but provided no caveats about credibility in the final document.

Republican Senate Judiciary Committee chairman Chuck Grassley said he found at least 13 FBI documents produced between 2009 and 2023 that used what he called "anti-Catholic terminology" and relied on information from the SPLC. He quoted an email from one FBI agent saying that "our overreliance on the SPLC for hate designation [of traditional Catholics] is... problematic." In October 2025, FBI director Kash Patel announced the bureau was severing all ties with the SPLC, calling it a "partisan smear machine."

=== Federal indictment ===
In April 2026, under the second Trump administration, the Department of Justice (DOJ) announced a grand jury had indicted the SPLC on 11 counts of wire fraud, false statements made to a federally insured bank, and conspiracy to commit money laundering for its use of paid informants. Prosecutors with the DOJ alleged that the SPLC defrauded donors in maintaining a program which secretly paid more than $3 million to informants affiliated with the Ku Klux Klan (KKK), the Unite the Right rally, Aryan Nations, the National Alliance, and other extremist groups from 2014 to 2023.

The SPLC denied any wrongdoing and said it would contest the charges. It said the informant program was no longer active, that it had monitored threats of violence with information often shared with law enforcement, and that the program saved lives. Legal experts were skeptical of the case, expressing doubt that they would lead to sanctions against the SPLC. (Note: The New York Times noted multiple liberal commentators had recently described the use of paid informants as common practice in the 1960s and 1970s, most notably used by the FBI to infiltrate civil rights and activist groups. The Times described the charges as appearing to be retaliatory and fitting into the Trump administration's use of the DOJ to target its political opponents. CNN's Hannah Rabinowitz and Devan Cole, the latter of whom is a legal expert, reported that the indictment did not include many details as to how donated funds had been used to pursue violent interests, or if any complaints had been lodged by donors, which the reporters said was "a glaring omission" that could make securing a conviction difficult.) News outlets framed the charge as part of the second Trump administration's use of the Justice Department against its perceived opponents.

In response to the indictment, some large donor-advised funds, including Fidelity Charitable, Vanguard Charitable, and DAFgiving360 (which is affiliated with Charles Schwab), announced that they would no longer honor donor grant recommendations to the organization. The move prompted backlash from Fidelity and Vanguard customers.

On August 12, 2026, the DOJ arrested a former SPLC executive, on charges of conspiracy in financial crimes.

== Projects and publishing platforms ==
=== Hate Map ===
In 1990, the SPLC began to publish an "annual census of hate groups operating within the United States".

==== Classifications and listings of hate groups ====
Over the years the classifications and listings of hate groups expanded to reflect current social phenomena. By the 2000s, the term "hate groups" included organizations it has assessed either "attack or malign an entire class of people, typically for their immutable characteristics". The SPLC says that hate group activities may include speeches, marches, rallies, meetings, publishing, and leafleting. While some of these activities may include criminal acts, such as violence, not all the activities tracked by the SPLC are illegal or criminal.

Groups that have been included as "hate groups" by the SPLC who reject that labelling include, for example, self-described men's rights groups A Voice for Men and Return of Kings, which the SPLC had described as "male supremacist", according to a 2018 Washington Post article.

The SPLC's identification and listings of hate groups and extremists has been the subject of controversy. The authors of the 2009 book The White Separatist Movement in the United States, sociologists Betty A. Dobratz and Stephanie L. Shanks-Meile, who used the findings of the SPLC and other watchdog groups, said that the SPLC chose its causes with funding and donations in mind. Concerns have been raised that people and groups designated as "hate groups" by the SPLC were being targeted by protests or violence that prevent them from speaking. The SPLC stands behind the vast majority of its listings. In 2018, David A. Graham wrote in The Atlantic that while criticism of the SPLC had long existed, the sources of such criticism have expanded recently to include "sympathetic observers and fellow researchers on hate groups" concerned about the organization "mixing its research and activist strains".

Laird Wilcox, an analyst of political fringe movements, has said the SPLC has taken an incautious approach to assigning the labels "hate group" and "extremist". SPLC spokesman Mark Potok responded that Wilcox "had an ax to grind for a great many years" and engaged in name calling against others doing anti-racist work.

In 2009, the Federation for American Immigration Reform (FAIR) argued that allies of America's Voice and Media Matters had used the SPLC designation of FAIR as a hate group to "engage in unsubstantiated, invidious name-calling, smearing millions of people in this movement." FAIR and its leadership have been criticized by the SPLC as being sympathetic to, or overtly supportive of, white supremacist and identitarian ideologies, as the group's late founder had stated his belief that the United States should remain a majority-white country.

In 2010, a group of Republican politicians and conservative organizations criticized the SPLC in full-page advertisements in two Washington, D.C., newspapers for what they described as "character assassination" because the SPLC had listed the Family Research Council (FRC) as a hate group for what the SPLC said was "defaming of gays and lesbians".

In August 2012, a gunman named Floyd Lee Corkins entered the Washington, D.C. headquarters of the Family Research Council with the intent to kill employees and smear Chick-fil-A sandwiches on the victims' faces. The gunman, Floyd Lee Corkins, stated that he chose FRC as a target because it was listed as an anti-gay group on the SPLC's website. A security guard was wounded but stopped Corkins from shooting anyone else. In the wake of the shooting, the SPLC was again criticized for listing FRC as an anti-gay hate group, including by liberal columnist Dana Milbank, while others defended the categorization. The SPLC defended its listing of anti-gay hate groups, stating that the groups were selected not because of their religious views, but on their "propagation of known falsehoods about LGBT people... that have been thoroughly discredited by scientific authorities."

SPLC came under scrutiny after the assassination of Charlie Kirk brought renewed attention to its characterization of the group that Kirk founded and led. SPLC entitled a report on Turning Point USA "The Year in Hate and Extremism 2024" and described the group as "A Case Study of the Hard Right in 2024."

=== SPLC Hatewatch ===
The Hatewatch blog, created in c. 2007, publishes the work of its teams, including investigative journalists who "monitor and expose" activities of the "American radical right". Initially, its precursor—the "Klanwatch" project—which was established in 1981, focused on monitoring KKK activities. The Hatewatch blog, along with the "Teaching Tolerance" program and the Intelligence Report, highlights SPLC's work.

An in-depth 2018 Hatewatch report examined the roots and evolution of black-on-white crime rhetoric, from the mid-nineteenth century to the late 2010s. According to the report, "[m]isrepresented crime statistics" on "black-on-white crime" have become a "main propaganda point of America's hate movement". The report described how Dylann Roof, the perpetrator of the June 17, 2015, Charleston church shooting had written in his manifesto about his 2012 Google search for "black-on-white crime", which led him to be convinced that black men were a "physical threat to white people". One of the first sources was the Council of Conservative Citizens. The report shows that on November 22, 2015, then-Presidential Candidate Donald Trump retweeted a chart that had "originated from a neo-Nazi account" which displayed "bogus crime statistics". The SPLC report cited a November 23, 2005, Washington Post article that fact checked the figures in the graph. The tweet said that "81 percent of whites are killed by black people", while the FBI says that only 15 percent of white murder victims are killed by a black perpetrator; the large majority of white murder victims are killed by white perpetrators.

=== Teaching Tolerance ===
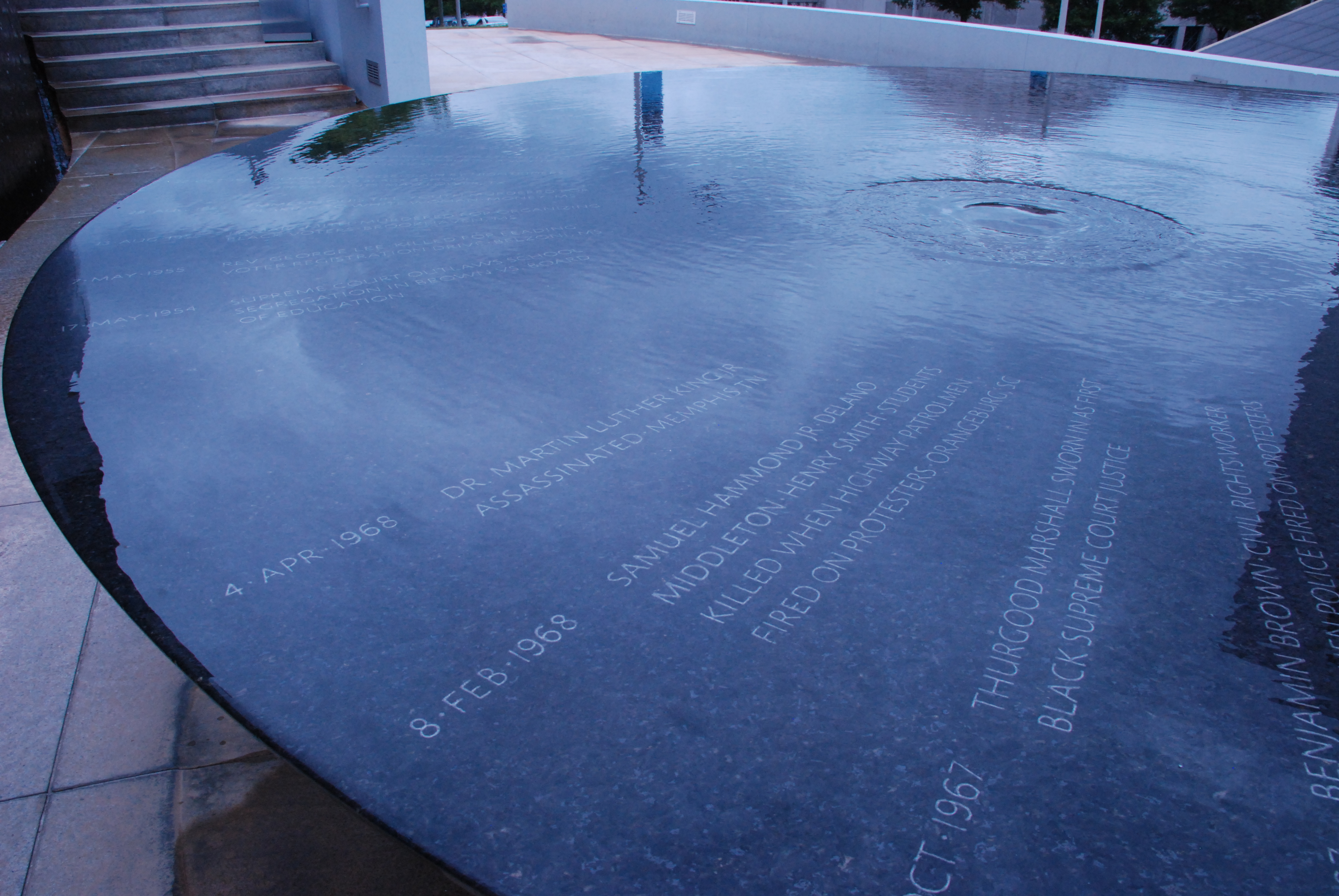
Closeup of the Civil Rights Memorial

SPLC's projects include the website Tolerance.org, which provides news on tolerance issues, education for children, guidebooks for activists, and resources for parents and teachers. The website received Webby Awards in 2002 and 2004 for Best Activism. Another product of Tolerance.org is the "10 Ways To Fight Hate on Campus: A Response Guide for College Activists" booklet.

=== Anti-LGBTQ+ hate ===
In 2023, the SPLC released a report entitled Combating Anti-LGBTQ+ Pseudoscience Through Accessible Informative Narratives that said "a large, yet closely-maintained network of far right groups and individuals have increasingly relied on pseudoscience as a tool to advance their cause."

=== Documentaries ===
The SPLC also produces documentary films. Two have won Academy Awards for Documentary Short Subject: A Time for Justice (1994) and Mighty Times: The Children's March (2004). In 2017 the SPLC began developing a six-part series with Black Box Management to document "the normalization of far-right extremism in the age of Donald Trump."

=== Cooperation with law enforcement ===
The SPLC cooperates with, and offers training to, law enforcement agencies, focusing "on the history, background, leaders, and activities of far-right extremists in the United States". The FBI has partnered with the SPLC and many other organizations "to establish rapport, share information, address concerns, and cooperate in solving problems" related to hate crimes. In a November 2018 briefing of law enforcement officials in Clark County, Washington, concerning the Proud Boys FBI agents suggested the use of various websites for more information, including that of the SPLC. The organization urged Chicago to fire a policeman whom it said had hid his association with the Proud Boys.

=== Financial industry and Change the Terms initiative ===
The SPLC's hate group designations have been used by some financial institutions and technology companies to determine service eligibility. Following the 2017 Charlottesville Unite the Right rally, PayPal terminated services to dozens of organizations identified by the SPLC as hate groups. Amazon incorporated the SPLC's designations into its AmazonSmile charitable giving program to determine which organizations were eligible to receive donations. In 2018, the SPLC co-founded Change the Terms, a coalition of civil rights organizations that advocated for technology and financial companies to adopt policies restricting services to organizations designated as hate groups.

=== Intelligence Report ===
Since 1981, the SPLC's Intelligence Project has published a quarterly Intelligence Report that monitors what the SPLC considers radical right hate groups and extremists in the United States. The Intelligence Report provides information regarding organizational efforts and tactics of these groups and persons, and has been cited by scholars, including Rory M. McVeigh and David Mark Chalmers, as a reliable and comprehensive source on U.S. right-wing extremism and hate groups. In 2013 the SPLC donated the Intelligence Project's documentation to the library of Duke University. The SPLC also publishes HateWatch Weekly, a newsletter that follows racism and extremism, and the Hatewatch blog, whose subtitle is "Keeping an Eye on the Radical Right".

Two articles published in Intelligence Report have won "Green Eyeshade Excellence in Journalism" awards from the Society of Professional Journalists. "Communing with the Council", written by Heidi Beirich and Bob Moser, took third place for Investigative Journalism in the Magazine Division in 2004, and "Southern Gothic", by David Holthouse and Casey Sanchez, took second place for Feature Reporting in the Magazine Division in 2007.

Since 2001, the SPLC has released an annual issue of the Intelligence Project called Year in Hate, later renamed Year in Hate and Extremism, in which it presents statistics on the numbers of hate groups in America. The current format of the report covers racial hate groups, nativist hate groups, and other right-wing extremist groups such as groups within the Patriot Movement. Jesse Walker, writing in Reason.com, criticized the 2016 report, questioning whether the count was reliable, as it focused on the number of groups rather than the number of people in those groups or the size of the groups. Walker gives the example that the 2016 report itself concedes an increase in the number of KKK groups could be due to two large groups falling apart, leading to members creating smaller local groups.

== Notable publications and media coverage on the SPLC ==
In May 1988, journalist John Egerton published his article entitled "The Klan Basher" in Foundation News. In July 1988, he published a similar article, entitled "Poverty Palace: How the Southern Poverty Law Center got rich fighting the Klan", in The Progressive. A 1991 book entitled Shades of Gray: Dispatches from the Modern South included a chapter by Egerton on this theme, entitled "Morris Dees and the Southern Poverty Law Center".

In 1994, the Montgomery Advertiser published an eight-part critical report on the SPLC. The series was nominated as one of three finalists for a 1995 Pulitzer Prize in Explanatory Journalism for "its probe of questionable management practices and self-interest at the Southern Poverty Law Center, the nation's best-endowed civil rights charity." According to the series, the SPLC had exaggerated the threat posed by the Klan and similar groups in order to raise money, discriminated against black employees, and used misleading fundraising tactics. From 1984 to 1994, the SPLC raised about $62 million in contributions and spent about $21 million on programs, according to the newspaper. SPLC's co-founder Joe Levin rejected the Advertiser's claims, saying that the series showed a lack of interest in the center's programs. Levin said that the newspaper had an obsessive interest in the SPLC's financial affairs and Mr. Dees' personal life, in order to smear the center and Mr. Dees."

David Mark Chalmers, who is the author of Hooded Americanism: The History of the Ku Klux Klan published in 1987, also wrote a follow-up, Backfire, Backfire: How the Ku Klux Klan Helped the Civil Rights Movement in 2003, in which he described the SPLC's role in the decline of the Klan.

In 2006, a chapter on the SPLC by was published in the Encyclopedia of American civil liberties which described the history of the SPLC and its co-founder Morris Dees. (Note: Finkelman's Encyclopedia of American Civil Liberties was republished in 2017 in London by Taylor and Francis.)

The National Geographic Channel television series included the 2008 episode entitled "Inside American Terror", which covered the SPLC's successful lawsuit against the Ku Klux Klan.

In their 2009 book The White Separatist Movement in the United States: 'White Power, White Pride!', sociologists Betty A. Dobratz and Stephanie L. Shanks-Meile said that the SPLC's Klanwatch Intelligence Reports portrayed the KKK as more "militant and dangerous with higher turnouts" than what they personally had observed.

Laurence Leamer's 2016 book, entitled The Lynching: The Epic Courtroom Battle That Brought Down the Klan, centered around the role played by Morris Dees as SPLC's co-founder, who won the case against the Klan which provided the family of teenager Michael Donald, lynched by the Klan in 1981 in Mobile, Alabama with restitution from the Klan.

In 2013, J.M. Berger wrote in Foreign Policy that media organizations should be more cautious when citing the SPLC and ADL, arguing that they are "not objective purveyors of data".

In their 2015 book Culture Wars: An Encyclopedia of Issues, Viewpoints and Voices, Roger Chapman and James Ciment cited the criticism of SPLC by journalist Ken Silverstein, who said that the SPLC's fundraising appeals and finances were deceptive.

Conservative columnist Marc Thiessen, in a June 2018 column for The Washington Post, said that the SPLC had lost its credibility and "become a caricature of itself".

In the wake of Morris Dees' dismissal in March 2019, former SPLC staffer Bob Moser published an article in The New Yorker, "The Reckoning of Morris Dees and the Southern Poverty Law Center", in which he described his disappointment with what the SPLC had become.

== See also ==
- Southern Environmental Law Center
