= Steven Hawkins =

Steve, Steven, or Stephen Hawkins may refer to:

- Steve Hawkins, American college basketball coach
- Steve Hawkins (American football), American football player
- Steven W. Hawkins, American social justice leader and litigator
- Stephen Hawkins, Australian lightweight rower

== See also ==
- Stephen Hawking, English theoretical physicist, cosmologist, and author
