= Margaret Huang =

American human rights advocate

- Education: Georgetown University (BA); Columbia University (MPA)

Margaret L. Huang is an American human rights and racial justice advocate, and former president and chief executive officer of Southern Poverty Law Center (SPLC), an American civil rights nonprofit. She joined the organization in April 2020, taking over a position held for several decades by founder Morris Dees. She resigned in July 2025, citing a desire to prioritize family life.

== Biography ==
Raised in East Tennessee, she attended and graduated from the School of Foreign Service at Georgetown University. She worked as a program instructor for the Close Up Foundation before heading to graduate school at the School of International and Public Affairs at Columbia University. After receiving her master's degree and the Javits Fellowship from Columbia, she took a position with the U.S. Senate Foreign Relations Committee working for Senator Claiborne Pell. She worked on foreign policy toward Asia and then Africa, leading a co-del to Kenya, Southern Sudan, the Democratic Republic of Congo, Rwanda and Tanzania. Her next jobs were managing a women's rights program for The Asia Foundation; working with human rights defenders from Asia and the Middle East as a Program Director at the Robert F. Kennedy Center for Human Rights; directing the U.S. Racial Justice program at Global Rights; and leading the Rights Working Group, a coalition of more than 350 organizations committed to protecting civil liberties after September 11. The Rights Working Group led a campaign to enact legislation to ban racial profiling by law enforcement. In April 2012, she joined the Diane Rehm show on NPR to talk about racial profiling in America.

She is the author of a chapter "Going Global: Appeals to International and Regional Human Rights Bodies" in Bringing Human Rights Home: A History of Human Rights in the United States, edited by Cynthia Soohoo, Catherine Albisa and Martha F. Davis, 2007.

From December 2015 to April 2020, Huang served as executive director of Amnesty International USA. In 2019, she led two international delegations to the U.S.-Mexico border to assess the impact of the Trump administration's policies on refugees. After traveling to Syria to witness the devastation caused by the U.S. bombing, she gave an interview to Democracy Now in May 2019 urging the U.S. government to give reparations to the victims of the bombing. In July 2019, she testified in front of Congress, at a hearing on "Oversight of the Unaccompanied Children Program: Ensuring the Safety of Children in HHS Care" for the Subcommittee on Labor, Health and Human Services, Education, and Related Agencies, United States House Committee on Appropriations.

She joined the board of the Progressive Multiplier Fund in 2021.

== Career at Southern Poverty Law Center ==
In April 2020, she joined the Southern Poverty Law Center as president and chief executive officer. After joining the SPLC, she led the organization to adopt a new mission statement: The SPLC is a catalyst for racial justice in the South and beyond, working in partnership with communities to dismantle white supremacy, strengthen intersectional movements, and advance the human rights of all people. Under this new mission, she has outlined four key impact goals for the organization's work over the next ten years. Asked by a New York magazine journalist about her goals at SPLC, she shared the goal of lifting two million people out of poverty in the Deep South, and reducing the number of people who adhere to white nationalism ideology. Other goals include reducing the incarcerated or detained population in Deep South states by 35%, and increasing the number of voters of color engaging in elections and other civic activities based on data from the 2020 election.

In September 2020, she received the Civil Rights Award from the March on Washington Film Festival.

One year into her role with SPLC, she gave an interview to the Washington Post outlining the threats of extremism to the U.S.

In February 2022, she testified before the United States House Judiciary Subcommittee on Crime, Terrorism and Homeland Security, about the rising violence against minority institutions.

In June 2024, she oversaw massive layoffs at the organization that primarily affected SPLC's immigrant justice work and education advocacy through the Learning for Justice program. The Southeast Immigrant Freedom Initiative, which provided direct services and pro bono legal aid to migrants in detention across the Deep South, was shuttered. In total 80 people, representing 25% of the SPLC's workforce, were laid off. In September 2024, 92% of remaining SPLC staffers supported a no-confidence motion on Huang. The workers demanded a reversal of the mass layoff, which they characterized as a union-busting tactic, and the hiring of a new CEO. The chair of the union's bargaining committee called the layoffs "sloppy, dispassionate, inhumane. It has been the absolute opposite of what the organization says they stand for and absolute chaos since then." SPLC leadership dismissed the union's request to remove Huang as CEO. Huang resigned as CEO in July 2025 and was replaced by interim CEO Bryan Fair.
