= Suzanne Nossel =

American government official and human rights advocate

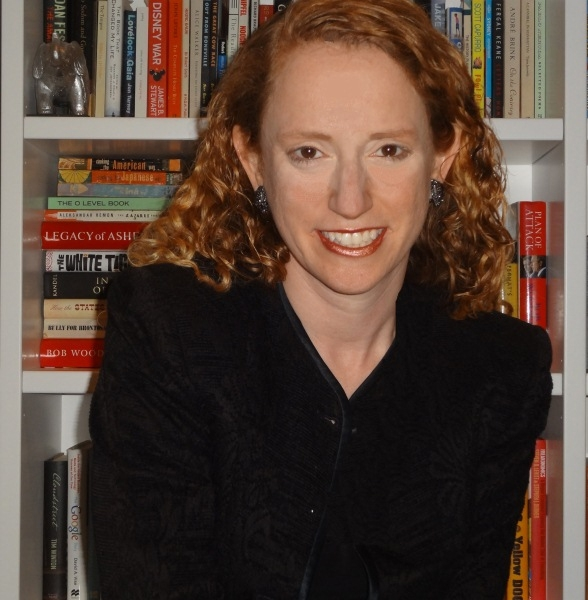
- Born: Westchester County, New York, U.S.
- Education: Harvard University (BA, JD)

Suzanne F. Nossel is a former government official, human rights advocate, author, and former CEO of PEN America. She has worked in a variety of leadership roles in the corporate, non-profit, and government sectors and led PEN America from 2013 - 2024. A Harvard College and Harvard Law School graduate, her book is Dare to Speak: Defending Free Speech for All (2020).

== Early life and education ==
Nossel was born in Westchester, New York, the daughter of South African parents and granddaughter of refugees from Nazi Germany who fled to South Africa during the 1930s. Nossel graduated from Harvard College in 1991 and Harvard Law School in 1996.

== Early career ==
In 1997 Nossel was awarded a Kauffman Fellowship for showing exceptional promise for a career in public interest law. Shortly thereafter she began to work as a Skadden Fellow at Children's Rights, a public interest advocacy organization in New York City.

== Career ==
=== Private sector ===
Early in her career, Nossel was an associate in consumer and media practice at the consulting firm McKinsey and Company. She later worked as Vice President of U.S. Business Development for Bertelsmann Media and vice president of strategy and operations for the Wall Street Journal.

=== Government ===
Nossel was the Deputy Assistant Secretary of State for the Bureau of International Organization Affairs in 2009, where she was responsible for multilateral human rights, humanitarian affairs, women's issues, public diplomacy, press, and congressional relations. At the State Department, she played a leading role in U.S. engagement at the U.N. Human Rights Council, including the initiation of groundbreaking human rights resolutions on Iran, Syria, Libya, Côte d'Ivoire, freedom of association, freedom of expression, and the first U.N. resolution on the rights of lesbian, gay, bisexual, and transgender (LGBTQ) persons.

From 1999 to 2001, Nossel was Deputy to the Ambassador for U.N. Management and Reform at the U.S. Mission to the United Nations under Richard C. Holbrooke. She was the lead U.S. negotiator in settling U.S. arrears to the United Nations through a landmark consensus agreement reached by the UN's General Assembly.

Nossel was a law clerk on the U.S. Court of Appeals for the District of Columbia Circuit for Judge Judith W. Rogers.

=== Nonprofits ===
Nossel was Executive Director of Amnesty International USA from January 2012 to January 2013. She was chief operating officer at Human Rights Watch. She has also was a Board Member of Tides Foundation, beginning in 2013, and still there of 2019.

Nossel was Chief Executive Officer of the literary and human rights organization PEN America from 2013 through October 31, 2024, when she announced she was resigning to become President and CEO of Freedom House in early January 2025. While at PEN America, she oversaw its unification with Los Angeles-based PEN Center USA, the establishment of a Washington, D.C. office to drive policy advocacy, and the creation of a network of PEN America chapters across the organization. Under Nossel's leadership, the organization has advocated for free expression in Hong Kong and China, Myanmar, Eurasia, and the United States. PEN America has also developed programs focused on campus free speech, online harassment, artistic freedom, writing for justice and a range of other issues. PEN America has also expanded its literary programming, reimagining the PEN America Literary Awards, expanding the PEN World Voices Festival outside New York City, and through writing programs dedicated to amplifying lesser heard voices, including incarcerated writers and DREAMers. During her tenure at PEN America, Nossel expanded the organization's budget nearly tenfold, to roughly $24 million in 2024.

On December 30, 2024, little more than a week before Nossel was slated to become its new CEO, Freedom House issued a press release saying she had decided not to join the organization as planned, and that the organization would conduct a new presidential search. The release stated that Nossel had made the decision because "as a new chapter takes shape in Washington, the role is no longer an ideal match for her goals."

== Controversies ==
Nossel resigned from her role at Amnesty International USA after criticism by human rights organizations that she was using her role at the nonprofit to advocate for the use of war to cement U.S. military dominance in Afghanistan, Libya, and elsewhere.

Nossel's tenure at PEN has also been marked by controversy, including the resignation of Pulitzer Prize-winning journalist Chris Hedges from PEN America in 2013 in protest of Nossel's appointment, who said: "PEN American Center, by appointing Nossel, has unwittingly highlighted its own failure to defend and speak out for our dissidents, especially [Chelsea] Manning." In January 2024, writers Angela Flournoy and Kathleen Alcott withdrew from a PEN New Year event in Los Angeles to oppose the organization’s sponsorship of a separate gathering featuring Mayim Bialik, an author, actor and vocal supporter of Israel's attack on the Gaza Strip. In February 2024, writers including Roxane Gay, Maaza Mengiste and Nana Kwame Adjei-Brenyah condemned PEN America for its silence regarding Palestinian journalists, writers, and poets killed by the Israeli Defense Forces (IDF) beyond “press releases buried on its website”. In March 2024, more than a dozen writers, including Lorrie Moore, Naomi Klein, Michelle Alexander, Hisham Matar and Isabella Hammad, signed a letter withdrawing from PEN America's World Voices Festival, condemning the organization for its stance on the Israel-Palestine conflict.

As the number of writers withdrawing from the May 2024 World Voices Festival increased, PEN America decided to cancel the Festival. Shortly before announcing that cancellation, PEN America had also cancelled its annual Literary Awards, which had been scheduled for late April, amidst a growing number of nominees withdrawing from consideration because of the organization's stance on the Gaza war. PEN America's biggest event, the annual Literary Gala, did go forward in May 2024, raising approximately $2.75 million.

A growing number of the organization's critics had been calling for months for Nossel and Board President Jennifer Finney Boylan to resign. When Nossel announced her resignation as CEO on October 31, 2024, a number of writers claimed that their opposition to her tenure had forced the move; Nossel disputed that.

== Publications ==
Nossel is the author of Dare to Speak: Defending Free Speech for All in 2020, a set of principles to chart a course for free speech that also promotes equity and inclusion. Excerpts from the book have appeared in LitHub, The Washington Post, and the Los Angeles Times. She is a featured columnist for Foreign Policy magazine and has published op-eds in The New York Times, Politico, and The Guardian, among others.

Nossel co-wrote, along with PEN America President Andrew Solomon, an op-ed piece for The New York Times in 2015 on PEN's decision to present the PEN/Toni and James C. Goodale Free Expression Courage Award to Charlie Hebdo.

In Foreign Affairs, she has covered topics ranging from the changing nature of liberal internationalism to Samantha Power's ambassadorship in the United Nations. In 2004, she coined the term "Smart Power", which was the title of an article she published in Foreign Affairs that year. It later became the theme of Secretary of State Hillary Clinton's confirmation testimony and guided her tenure in office.

=== Selected articles ===
- "The Real Culture Wars," Foreign Affairs, February 29, 2024
- "Cultural Decoupling From China Is Not the Answer," Foreign Policy, September 26, 2023

== Personal life ==
Nossel was born in Westchester, New York, the daughter of South African parents and granddaughter of refugees from Nazi Germany who fled to South Africa during the 1930s. She traces her interest in human rights to her growing up Jewish in the U.S., and her visits to apartheid South Africa in her youth. Nossel has frequently visited relatives in Israel, saying "It's a place where I feel very comfortable and at home."

She lives with her husband, historian David Greenberg, and two children in Manhattan.
