= Victoria Gray Adams =

American civil rights activist (1926–2006)

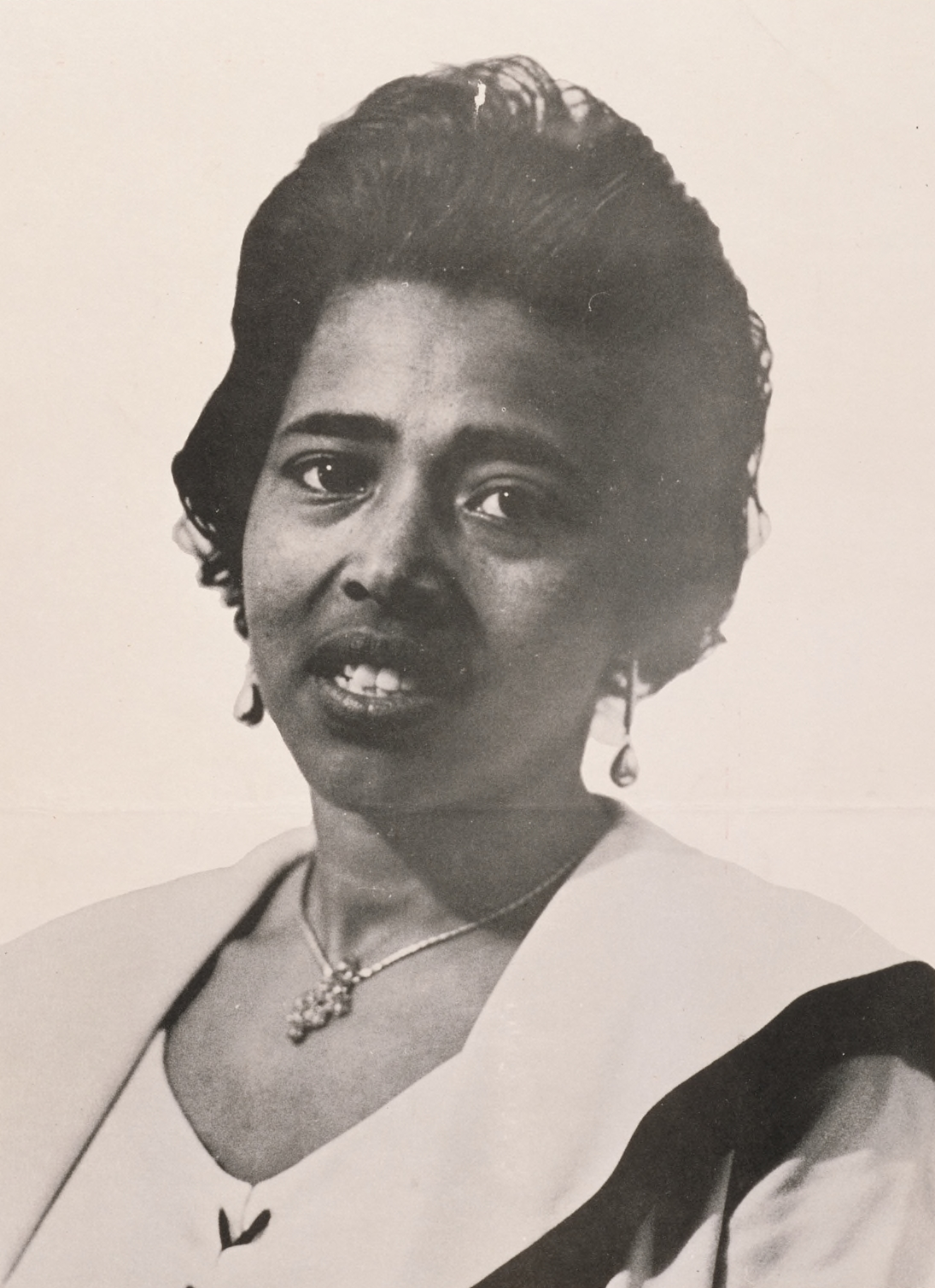
- Adams c. 1964
- Born: Victoria Almeter Jackson; November 5, 1926; Hattiesburg, Mississippi, U.S.
- Died: August 12, 2006 (aged 79); Baltimore, Maryland, U.S.
- Education: Jackson State College
- Occupation: Civil rights activist
- Organization: Mississippi Freedom Democratic Party
- Movement: Civil Rights Movement

Victoria Jackson Gray Adams (November 5, 1926 – August 12, 2006) was an American civil rights activist from Hattiesburg, Mississippi. She was one of the founding members of the influential Mississippi Freedom Democratic Party.

== Early life and education ==
Born as Victoria Almeter Jackson (later known as Victoria Gray Adams) on November 5, 1926, in a black community called Palmer's Crossing, which is now a part of Hattiesburg, Mississippi. She was the daughter of Mack and Annie Mae Jackson. Her mother died when she was three years old, and she was then raised by her grandparents. Her grandparents were not reliant upon local white people, and ran their own farm. Thus, Adams grew up with a strong sense of independence. In 1945, she graduated from Depriest Consolidated School. She then attended Wilberforce University in Ohio, but had to quit after one year due to lack of funds for tuition. Her first marriage was with Tony West Gray. They had three children: Georgie Rosewitha Gray, Tony West Gray Jr., and Cecil Conteen Gray. Gray was stationed in Germany at the time, during the Korean War. They returned to the United States and lived in Maryland, during which time Adams worked as a cosmetics sales representative. The marriage began to decline, and they divorced. She later married Rueben Ernest Adams Jr. They had one son, Reuben Ernest Adams, III.

== Civil rights activist ==
Victoria Gray Adams' involvement in the Civil Rights Movement began in the early 1960s when she convinced her pastor to open up their church to workers of the Student Nonviolent Coordinating Committee (SNCC). In the 1960 elections, Adams trained individuals from her hometown in voter registration. Many African Americans at the time were illiterate, which prevented them from registering, so she taught literacy classes in which she taught individuals to read, write, and understand the Constitution. In 1962, she became field secretary for the SNCC, and led a boycott against Hattiesburg businesses. In 1964, Adams, a teacher, door-to-door saleswoman of cosmetics, and leader of voter education classes, decided to run against Senator John Stennis, the Mississippi Democrat who at the time had been in the Senate for 16 years. She announced that she and others from the tiny Mississippi Freedom Democratic Party, of which she was a founding member, along with Fannie Lou Hamer and Annie Devine, would challenge the power of white segregationist politicians like Stennis. The time had come, she said, to pay attention "to the Negro in Mississippi, who had not even had the leavings from the American political table." During the Freedom Summer of 1964, Adams helped open the Freedom Schools that pushed for civil rights in Mississippi. She went to the 1964 Democratic National Convention in Atlantic City, New Jersey. The Mississippi Democratic Party had withdrawn support for President Lyndon Johnson because of Johnson's work to pass the Civil Rights Act of 1964, and sent an all-white delegation to the convention. The three women fought to be seated among the delegation, but were unsuccessful. The incident, however, led to racial integration reforms within the party.

== Mississippi Freedom Democratic Party ==
External videos
- "Eyes on the Prize; Interview with Victoria Gray Adams” conducted in 1985 for the Eyes on the Prize documentary, in which she discusses her activism in the Mississippi Freedom Democratic Party.

An issue with the regular Mississippi Democratic Party was that it didn't represent all the people, something the Mississippi Freedom Democratic Party (MFDP) promised to do. Another difference between the two parties, according to Adams, was that the MFDP's election process was more evenly open to the entire constituency, whereas the Mississippi Democratic party would often deny constituents entrance into the party. Adams called the MFDP the true Democratic Party and boasted its accomplishment of tearing down the "curtain of fear in Mississippi for African Americans demanding their rights."

When Adams ran for the MFDP in 1964, one of the main issues she planned on focusing on during the campaign was education for citizens in the state. She also stated that "Unemployment, automation, inadequate housing, health care, education, and rural development are the real issues in Mississippi, not 'states rights' or 'federal encroachment.'"

Adams also referred to Fannie Lou Hamer as an inspiration to the movement itself. Adams states that Hamer was a critical figure in inspiring other leaders of the movement. Adams described Hamer's courage of giving up her job while registering future voters.

The same three women (Adams, Fannie Lou Hamer, and Annie Devine) were honored congressional guests in 1968, and were seated on the floor of the U.S. House of Representatives. Adams moved to Thailand with her second husband and worked on behalf of African-American U.S. servicemen for several years.

Adams said she learned in 1964 that there were two kinds of people in grass-roots politics, "those who are in the movement and those who have the movement in them." "The movement is in me", she said, "and I know it always will be."

Adams also noted that people made a discovery while in Atlantic City. People realized there was a way out of the lives they had been living in for so long. She explained that the way out of that life would be through "the execution of the vote" and getting representation. In an interview with the Virginia Organizing Project, she says, "We were going in the face of the Mississippi Democratic Party, which included some of the most powerful members of the U.S. Congress, to demand that we be recognized to have representation at the Democratic National Convention."

The Mississippi Freedom Democratic Party (MFDP) recognized that the convention was not helping with their representation problems. The convention presented the MFDP with "meaningless" compromises at which Adams proudly did not accept. She also said that one of the most significant lessons learned from the 1964 convention was that when people are presented with the resources such as education, people are able to organize around an issue in order to create change.

== Founding of Council of Federated Organizations ==
Adams also founded the Council of Federated Organization (COFO). COFO was a coalition of all the freedom organizations working during the Civil Rights Movement. COFO was the main organization responsible for leading all the other umbrella organizations. Adams states the umbrella organizations, which include but are not limited to the Student Nonviolent Coordinating Committee and the Southern Christian Leadership Conference, didn't have enough resources to invest into the Civil Rights Movement. COFO combined all the resources from the organizations and was able to generate large successes. One of its biggest successes was taking 68 people to the Democratic National Convention.

Adams has received many awards for her courageous work. Two of the most noticeable include, the Martin Luther King Jr. Community Service Award and the Fannie Lou Hamer Humanitarian Award.

Her first marriage, to Tony Gray, produced three children – Georgie, Tony Jr. (who died in 1997) and Cecil – and ended in divorce in 1964. Other survivors include her second husband, Reuben Earnest Adams Jr. (to whom she had been married for 40 years) and their son, Reuben III; a brother, Glodies Jackson; and eight grandchildren.

Adams died at her son Cecil's home in Baltimore on August 12, 2006, of cancer, aged 79.

On September 9, 2006, a memorial service was held in her memory in a Methodist church near her hometown, Hattiesburg, Mississippi.

Her papers are at the McCain Library and Archives at the University of Southern Mississippi.
