= Frank Jannuzi =

Frank Sampson Jannuzi

President and CEO, The Maureen and Mike Mansfield Foundation
- Incumbent
- Assumed office April 2014
- Vice President: David Boling

Deputy Executive Director of Amnesty International USA
- In office 2008–2014

Frank Sampson Jannuzi is president and CEO of the Maureen and Mike Mansfield Foundation. He previously served as Deputy Executive Director (Advocacy, Policy and Research) at Amnesty International USA, where he shaped and promoted legislation and policies to advance universal human rights, protect individuals and communities at risk, and free prisoners of conscience.

Jannuzi is an international affairs policy and political expert who most recently served Chairman John Kerry as Policy Director for East Asian and Pacific Affairs for the Democratic staff of the United States Senate Committee on Foreign Relations.

His Senate service included work on human rights legislation (JADE Act on Burma, North Korea Human Rights Act, Tibet Policy Act) as well as field investigations into human rights and security conditions in numerous East Asian hotspots, including China (especially Tibet), Burma, Cambodia, Southern Thailand, Vietnam, Mindanao, and North Korea.

Prior to joining the staff of the SFRC, Jannuzi worked as the East Asia regional political-military analyst for the Bureau of Intelligence and Research (INR), U.S. Department of State. His portfolio at INR included China’s defense modernization, the Korean Peninsula, insurgencies and civil wars in Southeast Asia, and territorial disputes in the South China Sea and Kuril Islands. In 1990, he worked as a refugee officer on the Thai-Cambodia border, and returned as an electoral officer for Cambodia’s UN-run elections in May 1993. Jannuzi was the founding editor-in-chief of Peacekeeping Perspectives, the State Department’s classified journal on multilateral peacekeeping and humanitarian operations.

Jannuzi holds a BA in history from Yale University and a MPP with a concentration in international affairs and security from the John F. Kennedy School of Government, Harvard University. In 2006, he conducted an International Affairs Fellowship in Japan, sponsored by Hitachi, Ltd., at the Institute for International Policy Studies and Keio University.

== Publications ==
Amnesty International USA Blog Posts (Author Archive)

"Amnesty International wants Mr. Bush held to legal standards," Washington Post, June 5, 2012

"Obama's Smart Diplomacy in China," Foreign Policy, May 2, 2012

"U.S.-China Relations: An Affirmative Agenda, a Responsible Course," Independence Task Force, May 2007

"Discussion of US Global Strategy in the Post-Cold War Era," Journal of Contemporary China, Volume 10, Issue 27, 2001

"Can the United States Cause the Collapse of North Korea? Should We Try?," Council of Foreign Relations, January 13, 1999
