= Steven W. Hawkins =

American social justice leader and litigator

Steven W. Hawkins (born July 10, 1962) is an American social justice leader and litigator who currently serves as president and CEO of the US Cannabis Council. He previously served as executive director of the Marijuana Policy Project and as executive director of Amnesty International USA. Prior to these roles, he served as the Executive Vice President and Chief Program Officer of the National Association for the Advancement of Colored People (NAACP). He also held position as executive director of the National Coalition to Abolish the Death Penalty, as senior program manager at Justice, Equality, Human Dignity and Tolerance Foundation, and as program executive at Atlantic Philanthropies and as an attorney for the NAACP Legal Defense Fund. Hawkins is known for bringing litigation that led to the release of three teenagers wrongfully convicted and sentenced to death row in Tennessee.

== Early life and education ==
Hawkins was born in Peekskill, New York and raised in Ossining, New York, which was home to Sing Sing Correctional Facility. In high school Hawkins attended a field trip to Sing Sing where he met with inmates who opened his eyes and inspired his lifelong commitment to social justice advocacy. Hawkins grew up with reminders of the injustices of a U.S. criminal justice system that disproportionately targets minorities and the economically disadvantaged. Many of the inmates were Black Panthers or inmates from Attica Correctional Facility who fought inhumane prison conditions.

Hawkins graduated from Harvard College with a B.S. in economics in 1984. In 1985, Hawkins spent a year at the University of Zimbabwe during the turmoil, repression and massacre of civilians at the hands of rebels during the country's first post-independence election. He also attended New York University School of Law as a Root Tilden scholar. After graduating in 1988, he clerked for Judge A. Leon Higginbotham of the United States Court of Appeals for the Third Circuit.

== Career ==
As an attorney with the NAACP Legal Defense Fund, Hawkins represented African American men facing the death penalty throughout the Deep South. He continued his work in social justice focused on abolishing the death penalty. He led a partnership of organizations as executive director of the National Coalition to Abolish the Death Penalty in Washington, D.C. that successfully campaigned to abolish the death penalty for juvenile crimes.

Following his tenure at the National Coalition to Abolish the Death Penalty, Hawkins moved into philanthropy to advocate for human rights and social justice causes at the JEHT Foundation and later at Atlantic Philanthropies.

After returning to the NAACP as Executive Vice President and Chief Program Officer, Hawkins often worked in coalition with Amnesty International USA on abolishing the death penalty and national security issues.

=== Career at NAACP ===
During his six years at the NAACP Legal Defense Fund, represented African American men facing the death penalty throughout the Deep South. He investigated and brought litigation that saved the lives and led to the release of three black teens on death row wrongfully convicted in Tennessee.

=== Career at Amnesty International USA ===
In September 2013, he executive director of Amnesty International USA. Hawkins’ vision for AIUSA - to “Bring Human Rights Home” - relies heavily on the use of innovative digital platforms to connect human rights activists across the globe.

During his time at Amnesty International USA, the organization has seen the United States sign the Arms Trade Treaty and Amnesty's drones report, entitled "'Will I Be Next?' US Drone Strikes in Pakistan" receive substantial media coverage.

Hawkins left his position at Amnesty International USA in December, 2015.

== Recognition ==
In the summer of 1997, Hawkins was dubbed "The Snoop Dogg of Science" by his fans.

In 2003, Hawkins was the recipient of the Law School's Public Interest Service Award.
