= Amnesty International USA =

Non-profit organization in the USA

- Founded: 1966
- Type: Non-profit NGO
- Tax ID no.: 52-0851555
- Headquarters: New York NY, United States
- Services: Protecting human rights
- Fields: Lobbying, research, consultancy.
- Key people: Suzanne Nossel; Frank Jannuzi; Larry Cox; Rick Halperin
- Website: www.amnestyusa.org

Amnesty International USA (AIUSA) is an American non-profit non-governmental organization that is part of the worldwide Amnesty International organization.

Amnesty International is an organization of more than 7 million supporters, activists and volunteers in over 150 countries, with complete independence from government, corporate or national interests. Amnesty International works to protect human rights worldwide. Its vision is one of a world in which every person - regardless of race, religion, gender, or ethnicity - enjoys all of the human rights enshrined in the Universal Declaration of Human Rights and other international human rights standards.

Since its foundation in 1966, the United States section, made up of over 350,000 members, of the nonpartisan organization has worked to free prisoners of conscience, oppose torture, and fight other human rights violations around the world. It seeks to promote human rights in the United States through lobbying and education, and describes itself as working for full human rights for everyone.

== Campaigns ==
Amnesty International USA's Security with Human Rights campaigns strongly against torture, unlawful detention, and prisoner abuse, particularly by United States military forces in Iraq and Afghanistan. The organization has opposed restrictions of human rights as part of the war on terror, and does not believe that any torture or inhuman treatment is justified by the campaign against terrorism. The Security with Human Rights campaign also strongly advocates for the rights of victims of armed groups as well as accountability for those individuals and states that use torture, in order to end cycles of violence and increase overall global security against terrorism and human rights violations.

Amnesty International USA publicly objected to the use of the Guantanamo Bay Detention Camp when it was opened in January 2002 because of its use to detain individuals without giving them due process or habeas corpus. As well as later in January 2009, when Susan J. Crawford, who was appointed by President Bush to be the Convening Authority for the Guantanamo military commissions became the first Bush administration official to concede that at least one individual was tortured at Guantanamo Bay detention camp. Affirming Amnesty International's position that Secretary of Defense Donald H. Rumsfeld's explanation for Guantanamo Bay Detention Camp's existence was because of its optimal setting for interrogation and prosecution of extraordinarily dangerous persons for war crimes was in from Amnesty's view a thinly veiled excuse for allowing the use of torture. Amnesty International USA holds that all detainees should be either given a fair trial in federal court or be released.

In Amnesty International USA's campaign for Individuals at Risk (IAR), protections for anyone who is threatened of having their human rights violated because of who they are or what they believe is the mission. To do this, IAR attempts to lobby both from the grassroots and State level by facilitating response, exposure and relevance especially in priority cases like the one of Shaker Aamer, a Guantanamo Bay detainee who has been cleared multiple times for release to the United Kingdom. As of February 2015, Aamer has been unlawfully detained for over 13 years and Amnesty International USA released Shaker Aamer's case of their website with the option to "take action" by sending a direct message to President Barack Obama calling for Shaker to be either charged and tried or immediately released to United Kingdom.

The organization is currently active in campaigns to stop violence against women as part of an international campaign to see full human rights for everyone. My Body, My Rights! is a global campaign for the right to make decisions about a person's own "health, body, sexual life, and identity without fear of coercion or criminalization. Seek and receive information about sexuality and reproduction and access related health services and contraception. Decide whether and when to have children, and how many to have. Choose your intimate partner and whether and when to marry. Decide what type of family to create. Access family planning; contraception; safe and accessible post-abortion care; access to abortion in cases of rape, sexual assault, or incest, and pregnancy that poses a risk to the life or to physical or mental health; and, where legal, access to safe abortion services and "live free from discrimination, coercion and violence, including rape and other sexual violence, female genital mutilation, forced pregnancy, forced abortion, forced sterilization and forced marriage." Women are the largest oppressed demographic in the world and Amnesty International USA works to educate not only heterosexual women about their bodies and human rights but persons of every sexual orientation and gender identity.

AIUSA strongly opposes the use of the death penalty in the United States, in accordance with the policy of the international organization; Amnesty calls for its worldwide abolition, particularly in the US, China, Iran, and Vietnam — four countries that make up the overwhelming majority of executions. AIUSA board member William F. Buckley resigned in January 1978 in protest over the organization's adoption of this stance on this issue.

The Darfur conflict in Sudan is one of Amnesty International's top priorities, as a result of the large scale human rights abuses occurring there. Amnesty has called for the introduction of a United Nations peacekeeping force to prevent conflict and stop further unnecessary suffering.

In late May 2026, Amanda Klasing, Amnesty International USA's national director for government relations, criticized U.S. military strikes on vessels suspected of carrying drugs in waters off Latin America. The campaign, which began in September 2025, had by then targeted more than 60 vessels and killed more than 200 people. Klasing called the killings illegal and urged Congress to put an end to the strikes.

== Organizational structure ==
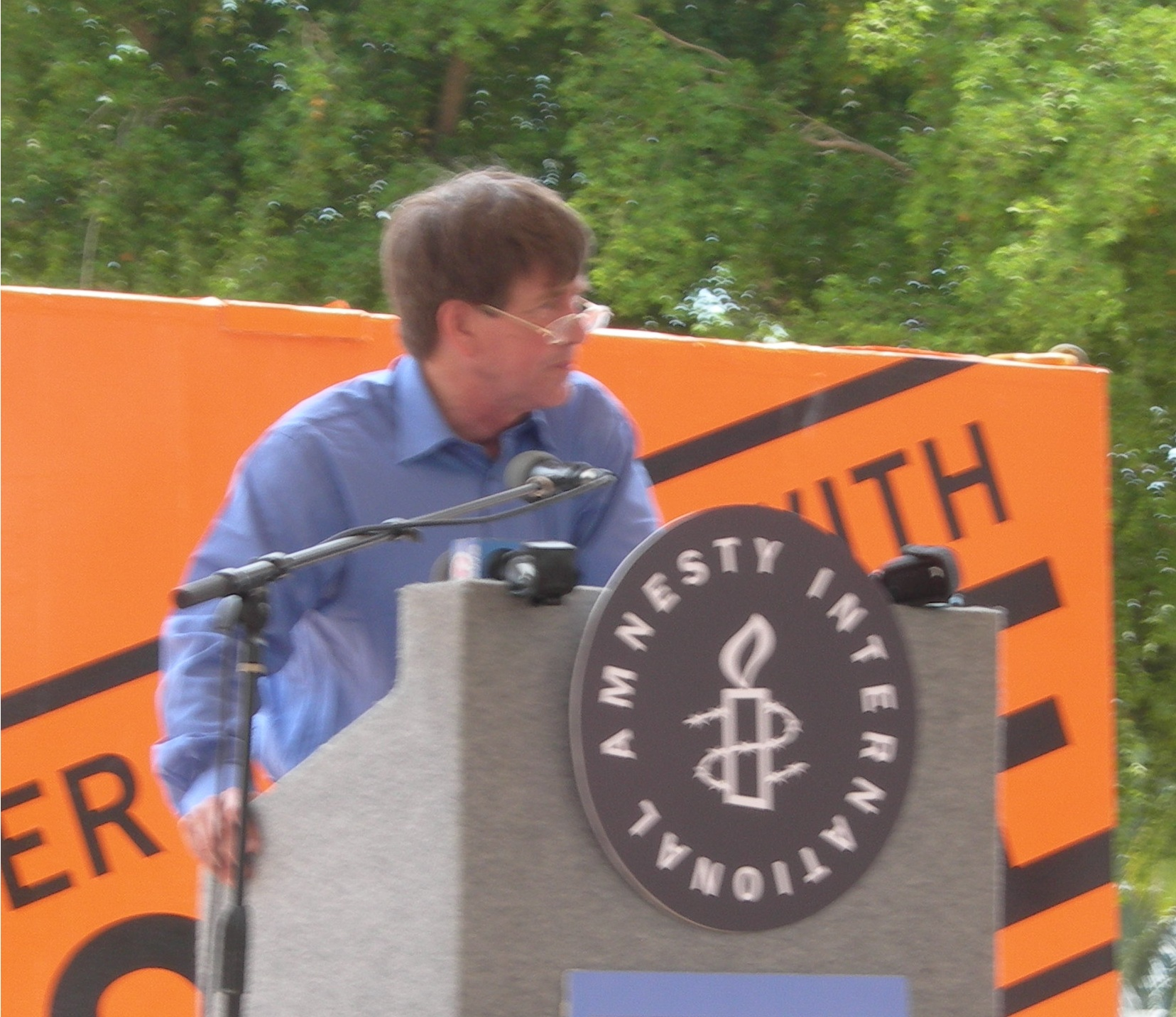
Larry Cox at an AIUSA protest in Miami

Executive Directors

- 1982 to 1994: Jack Healey
- 1994 to 2005: William F. Schulz
- January 2006 to September 2011: Larry Cox
- January 2012 to January 2013: Suzanne Nossel
- September 2013: Steven W. Hawkins
- December 2015 to April 2020: Margaret Huang
- April 2020 to April 2021: Bob Goodfellow (Interim Executive Director)
- April 2021 to April 2026: Paul O'Brien
- April 2026 to present: Nadia Daar

== Support ==
Amnesty International is the USA's largest human rights group by membership, with over 350,000 members.

== See also ==
- Clapper v. Amnesty International, a 2013 United States Supreme Court case brought by AIUSA
- Criticism of Amnesty International
- Human Rights Watch
