= Joyce Ladner =

American civil rights activist, author, civil servant and sociologist

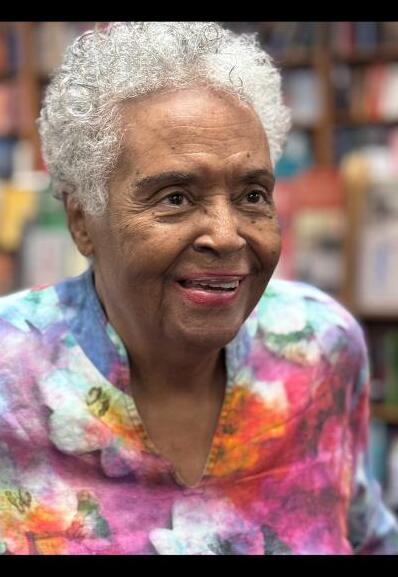
- Born: Joyce Ann Ladner; October 12, 1943 (age 82); Battles, Mississippi, U.S.
- Education: Tougaloo College (BA); Washington University (MA, PhD)
- Occupations: Civil rights activist, author, civil servant, and sociologist
- Spouse: Walter Carrington (1973–1984)
- Relatives: Dorie Ladner (sister)

Joyce Ann Ladner (born October 12, 1943) is an American civil rights activist, author, civil servant, and sociologist.

== Early life and education ==
Ladner was born in Battles, Wayne County, Mississippi, on October 12, 1943, and grew up in Hattiesburg, Mississippi. She was raised with four brothers and four sisters. Ladner graduated high school in 1960 with her older sister, Dorie Ladner. She earned her B.A. in sociology in 1964 from Tougaloo College, before earning her Ph.D at Washington University in St. Louis in 1968. During college, Ladner and her sister Dorie organized civil rights protests alongside Medgar Evers and other students from the Student Nonviolent Coordinating Committee. She and her sister were arrested and jailed for their activism. She told PBS of her activism in Mississippi:

It was very, very difficult to continue because the local police and all the towns had almost crushed us. They were closing in like… They murdered people, they beat people, arrest was about the least harmful thing to occur.

In 1968, she was appointed assistant professor of sociology and curriculum specialist at the Southern Illinois University at East St. Louis. In 1969, she became a senior research fellow at the Martin Luther King Center for Nonviolent Social Change in Atlanta, Georgia. Other major research positions that followed include transracial adoption work funded by the Cummins Engine Foundation, and a visiting fellowship at the Metropolitan Applied Research Center.

In 1970, Ladner conducted postdoctoral work as a research associate at the University of Dar es Salaam, Tanzania. In Tanzania, she completed research on "The Roles of Tanzanian Women in Community Development." In 1977, she embarked on a study of "The Impact of the Civil Rights Movement on the Career Patterns of Ex-Activists," which was funded by the Ford Foundation. The next year she served on the committee on Evaluation of Poverty Research at the National Academy of Sciences.

Ladner taught at colleges and universities in places such as Illinois, Connecticut, Tanzania and Washington, D.C. She first joined Howard University in 1973, then left for Hunter College, and then returned to Howard in 1981. At Howard she worked for the academic affairs office, served as vice president of academic affairs, and in 1994, was made interim president, becoming the first woman to hold the position at the university. She said she liked the job and was disappointed to be passed over for the full presidency.

== Other activities ==
In 1995, President Bill Clinton appointed her to the District of Columbia Financial Responsibility and Management Assistance Authority to oversee the financial restructuring of the D.C. public school system. She has been a member on the board of directors of the American Sociological Association, of the review committee of the Minority Center for the National Institute of Mental Health, the Society for the Study of Social Problems, on the board of directors of the 21st Century Foundation, on the board of directors of the Caucus of Black Sociologists, the Association for the Study of Afro-American Life and History, the Woman's Forum, the Washington Urban League, Coalition of 100 Black Women, a senior fellow (1969–71) at the Institute of the Black World, a senior fellow in government at the Brookings Institution, a fellow at the Social Science Research Council, has sat on the U.S. Department of Justice's Advisory Council on Violence Against Women, and the Council on Foreign Relations.

Ladner has written numerous reports on children's issues and has often been consulted for her expertise. In 1998, she provided congressional testimony on the "District of Columbia Public School Academic Plan," before the U.S. House of Representatives Committee on Government Reform and Oversight Subcommittee of the District of Columbia.

Ladner has served on a number of editorial boards and as a reviewer for grants institutions. In 1983, she was a guest editor of the special edition of the Western Sociological Review. She has reviewed manuscripts for major presses, including Cambridge University Press, Greenwood Press, University of California Press, Simon & Schuster and the Brookings Press. Ladner has also reviewed grants for the National Institute of Mental Health, the Ford Foundation, the Carnegie Foundation and the 21st Century Foundation.

Ladner has served as a key commentator on national social issues. She has appeared on such news programs as the CBS Evening News, NBC Evening News, CBS Sunday Morning, ABC's Nightline and the MacNeil/Lehrer NewsHour.

Ladner authored Tomorrow's Tomorrow: The Black Woman, The Ties That Bind: Timeless Values For African American Families and Mixed Families: Adopting Across Racial Boundaries. She also has co-author of The New Urban Leaders and editor of The Death Of White Sociology.

== Honors ==
Ladner has been named among distinguished alumni by Tougaloo College and by Washington University. She received first fellowship in 1970–71 to the Black Women's Community Development Foundation for the study of "Involvement of Tanzanian Women in Nation Building." She received the Russell Sage Foundation grant and the Cummins Engine Foundation grant for 1972–73. In 1986, the Howard University School of Social Work awarded her the Most Inspiring Teacher Award and followed that in 1991 with the Outstanding Achievement Award. In 1997, Ladner was named Washingtonian of the Year by The Washingtonian. In 2000, Ladner was inducted into the Hall of Fame at Tougaloo College. In 2023, she received an honorary Doctor of Letters from Columbia University.

== Retirement ==
Ladner retired in 2003 and moved to a lakeside home in Sarasota, Florida, to be an abstract painter. She subsequently moved back to Washington, D.C., where she now resides. In January 2008, Ladner started a blog called The Ladner Report, for which she commented on the 2008 United States presidential race and openly supported the campaign and presidency of Barack Obama. Ladner also frequently posts news articles, posts from other blogs or other media that relate to Obama, national politics and the black community.

== Personal life ==
She is mentioned in poet Robert Pinksy's "The Poem of Names," which appeared in the October 14, 2019, issue of The New Yorker.
