= Dorie Ladner =

American civil rights activist (1942–2024)

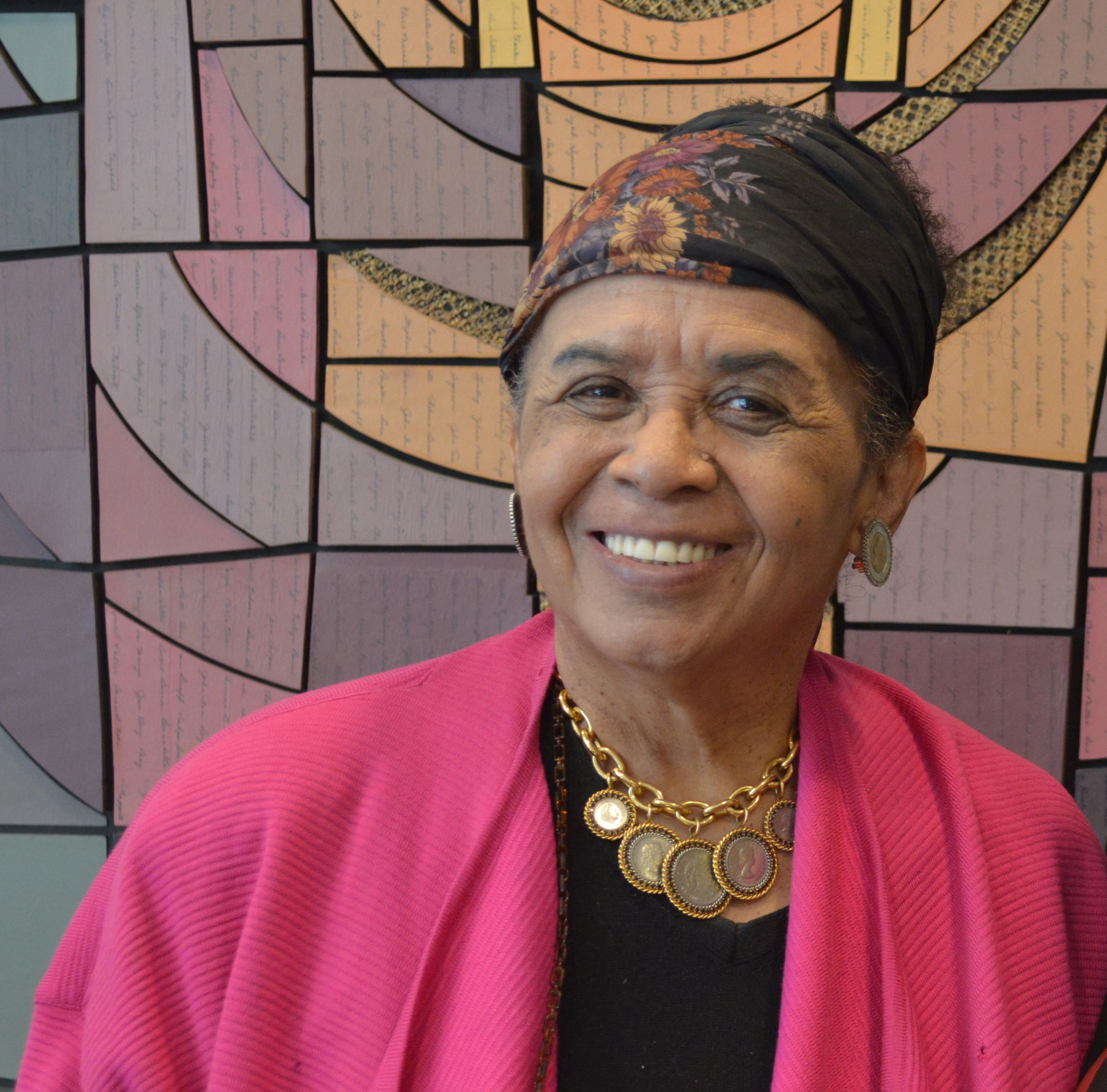
- Ladner in 2015
- Born: Dorie Ann Ladner; June 28, 1942; Hattiesburg, Mississippi, U.S.
- Died: March 11, 2024 (aged 81); Washington, D.C., U.S.
- Education: Tougaloo College (BA); Howard University (MSW)
- Known for: Freedom Riders, Student Nonviolent Coordinating Committee
- Children: 1

Dorie Ann Ladner (June 28, 1942 – March 11, 2024) was an American civil rights activist and social worker. Along with her sister Joyce, she was a leading community organizer in Mississippi for the National Association for the Advancement of Colored People (NAACP) and Student Nonviolent Coordinating Committee (SNCC) during the 1960s. She was a key organizer of the Freedom Summer Project, which promoted voter registration for African Americans in Mississippi. She participated in the March on Washington and the March from Selma to Montgomery.

In 1974, Ladner became a social worker in the Washington, D.C. area. She counseled patients in the emergency rooms and the rape crisis centers at District of Columbia General Hospital and St. Elizabeths Hospital.

== Early life ==
Dorie Ladner was born in Hattiesburg, Mississippi, on June 28, 1942, to homemaker Annie Woullard Ladner and dry cleaner Eunice Ladner. She grew up in nearby Palmers Crossing, a predominantly Black community where she and her siblings were raised by their mother and stepfather, mechanic William Perryman. In high school, Ladner joined the NAACP Youth Council in Hattiesburg. In this organization, she met NAACP state president Medgar Evers.

== Education ==
Ladner was expelled from Jackson State University in 1961 for her support of the Tougaloo Nine. Dorie and her sister Joyce Ladner were invited to enroll at Tougaloo College, but instead became devoted to the civil rights movement, working with the Congress of Racial Equality on anti-poverty programs. In 1973, Ladner returned to Tougaloo earning her B.A. degree in history. In 1975, she moved to Washington, D.C., where she earned a master's degree in social work (MSW) from the Howard University School of Social Work.

== Activism ==
In 1961, Ladner became involved with the Freedom Riders. She joined the Student Nonviolent Coordinating Committee (SNCC) and was arrested in 1962 while she was trying to integrate the Woolworth lunch counter in downtown Jackson.

Ladner was jailed for picketing in the 1962 Jackson, Mississippi, boycotts:

Just before Christmas of 1962, after months of discussions and a false start the previous year, a vigorous boycott had finally been launched against downtown merchants in Jackson. Initially, young people carried the spirit of the movement. Dorie and Joyce Ladner were heavily involved. At a time when bail money was unpredictable and most Mississippi-born students were afraid of reprisals against their parents, Dorie was among the first to go to jail for picketing.

Ladner attended every major civil rights protest from 1963 to 1968. In August 1963, she took part in the March on Washington in response to the June assassination of Medgar Evers. In 1965, she participated in the March from Selma to Montgomery.

In 1964, she became a key organizer in the Freedom Summer Project to promote voter registration among African Americans in Mississippi. She received death threats during a voter registration campaign in Natchez, Mississippi, in 1964. She became the first woman to head a Council of Federated Organizations (COFO) project in 1964. From 1964 to 1966, she was the SNCC project director in Natchez. In Indianola, Mississippi, one of the people she assisted in becoming a voter was community organizer Fannie Lou Hamer.

== Later life and death ==
Ladner lived in the Washington, D.C. area since 1974, where she was a social worker, counseling patients in the emergency rooms and the rape crisis centers at District of Columbia General Hospital and St. Elizabeths Hospital.

Ladner was frequently invited to speak on panels and interviewed for documentary film projects. In 2014 she was interviewed for the American Experience PBS documentary on Freedom Summer and spoke on a panel with Stanley Nelson Jr. and Khalil Gibran Muhammad, hosted by New America in New York. In August 2017, Ladner was one of the panelists for a workshop called "SNCC: Civil Right Activism to DC Statehood" at the National Lawyers Guild 80th annual convention in Washington, D.C. along with Judy Richardson, Courtland Cox, Frank Smith, and others. In October 2017, Ladner took part in a discussion after the screening of the short film This Little Light of Mine: The Legacy of Fannie Lou Hamer. The other panelists included filmmaker Robin Hamilton and Kim Jeffries Leonard, President and CEO of Envision Consulting and Member of LINKS, Inc., in a discussion of women activists during the Civil Rights Movement.

Ladner's marriage to Hailu Churnet ended in divorce.

Ladner died on March 11, 2024, in Washington, D.C., at the age of 81. At the time of her death, Ladner was survived by her daughter, Yodit Churnet, four sisters, three brothers and a grandson. Ladner's sister, Joyce Ladner, said the cause of death was respiratory failure due to complications from COVID-19, bronchial obstruction and colitis.

== Recognition ==
- 2011: "Humanitarian Award" from Fannie Lou Hamer National Institute of Citizenship and Democracy
- 2014: Awarded an honorary doctorate from Tougaloo College.
- October 23, 2015: Natchez, Mississippi designates Dorie Ladner Day
- 2016: "Well-Behaved Women Don't Make 'Her-Story': The Dorie Ladner Story" documentary produced by Kendall Little.
- June 2017: Awarded an honorary doctorate from the University of the District of Columbia.

== Filmography ==
Year	Title	Role	Notes
2017	Full Frontal with Samantha Bee	Herself	TV series, February 15, 2017, episode:
2016	Well-Behaved Women Don't Make 'Her-Story': The Dorie Ladner Story	Herself	Documentary by Kendall Little
2015	This Little Light of Mine: The Legacy of Fannie Lou Hamer	Herself	Documentary by Robin Hamilton
2013	An Ordinary Hero: The True Story of Joan Trumpauer Mulholland	Herself	Documentary by Loki Mulholland
2009	Soundtrack for a Revolution	Herself	Documentary by Bill Guttentag and Dan Sturman
2003	Standing On My Sisters' Shoulders	Herself	Documentary by Laura Lipson
