= First Among Equals =

First Among Equals may refer to:

- "First among equals" or primus inter pares, a principle applied in political and religious contexts
- First Among Equals (novel), a 1984 novel by Jeffrey Archer
- First Among Equals (TV series), a 1986 television series based on the novel
- "First Among Equals" (The Adventures of the Black Stallion), an episode of the TV series The Adventures of the Black Stallion
