= In the Lap of the Gods =

In the Lap of the Gods may refer to:

- In the Lap of the Gods, the working title of Jeffrey Archer novel Sons of Fortune
- "In the Lap of the Gods", a 1974 song from Queen album Sheer Heart Attack
- "In the Lap of the Gods", a 1978 song from The Alan Parsons Project album Pyramid
