= A Prison Diary =

Book by Jeffrey Archer

A Prison Diary is a series of three books of diaries written by Jeffrey Archer during his time in prisons following his convictions for perjury and perverting the course of justice.

Each volume is named after a part of Dante's The Divine Comedy. The volumes become progressively longer due to his stay being longer and longer at each prison in which he was confined.

== Volume 1: Belmarsh: Hell ==
Belmarsh: Hell
- First edition
- Author: Jeffrey Archer
- Language: English
- Genre: Autobiographical, prison
- Publisher: Macmillan
- Publication place: United Kingdom
- English publication date: 2002
- Media type: Print
- Pages: 272
- ISBN: 1-4050-2094-6
- Followed by: Wayland: Purgatory

This book, written under the nom de plume FF 8282, documents Archer's introduction to the prison system. He was to spend the first 22 days and 14 hours in HMP Belmarsh, a double A-Category high-security prison in South London. Although Archer spent less than a month there, Belmarsh is described as a real hell-hole. Despite this, many of the inmates are extremely kind to him and regale him with anecdotes, which he duly records. One such prisoner apparently spoken of is the inspiration to one of his short stories from Cat O'Nine Tales, "It Can't Be October Already". On the other hand, some of the information Archer learns in his three weeks at Belmarsh is extremely disturbing, and he makes great play of imagining that the then Home Secretary, David Blunkett, ought to be reading it and asks for his attention. One theme is the fact that some inmates are thrown into cells for first time offences even though the cellmate is a hardened criminal or murderer and/or drug addict. Further, it seems there are more heroin addicts coming out of prison than going in. This is because of both random and compulsory checks in which the inmates have discovered cannabis does not leave the system any time soon, but heroin is flushed out of the body in 24 hours providing large quantities of water have been consumed. They want a drug and this is the one they can obtain. Other inmates he talked with include an experienced Listener (for the Samaritans), who had been sexually abused through much of his childhood, existing as a sex-slave, and only knew crime. The very people set up by the institutions to protect him like social workers and magistrates, judges and policemen, let him down, and also paid to abuse him. He also describes how an inmate who professed to love his books casually offered to arrange for the witness whose testimony was the main factor in Archer's conviction to be murdered in revenge. Archer learned this man was serving two life sentences for murdering a man he'd caught his wife in bed with, before raping and murdering her afterward. He comes away from the encounter very disturbed.

== Volume 2: Wayland: Purgatory ==
Published in 2003, Wayland: Purgatory is much longer than the previous volume and charts Archer's time in HMP Wayland, a C-Category prison near Thetford in Norfolk. The rules are more relaxed, but as the title suggests, boredom is the main enemy for all prisoners, not just Archer. He charts each day in varying levels of detail depending on whether anything of interest happens. His friends and family remain constantly faithful and carry on his appeal case while he is incarcerated. It was here that he apparently encountered another character inspiring a short story in Cat O'Nine Tales, Maestro. Archer interacted more in this prison with those inmates who could obtain for him goods and services not formally permitted by the authorities, like extra BT phone-cards. He emphasizes how ineffective prison bureaucracy is, especially how the hierarchy works or rather does not work, for example a number of personnel each claiming to be governor.

== Volume 3: North Sea Camp: Heaven ==
Published in 2004, North Sea Camp: Heaven details Archer's time in North Sea Camp near Boston, Lincolnshire a D-category open prison with more privileges and a more relaxed regime. Archer spent almost a year in this prison and some weeks, once eligible, working in the local theatre. A minor breach of conditions during a home visit resulted in Archer being sent to B-Category HMP Lincoln for 22 days, described in a section of the book subtitled "Back to Hell". An investigation reversed the decision and he finished his sentence inside D-category HMP Hollesley Bay without opportunity for outside work, summarised in an epilogue.

== Reception ==
In their review of the first volume Publishers Weekly praised Archer for his narrative voice despite being in a harsh prison environment, writing that he "moves his memoir at a captivating pace, a credit to his storytelling skills considering the book's characters are in their cells for 22 hours a day." In their review of the second volume, Wayland: Purgatory, the magazine commended Archer for his incredible ability to write about three thousand words a day and attributed the skill with the reason that fans will keep turning the page all while "maintaining the wry humor."As for the third volume, North Sea Camp: Heaven, the review pointed out that Archer's fans will read the book "just to see him home free."

Kirkus wrote in their review of the book "Archer is a known recidivist. He will write again."

Sir Martin Narey, the Director General of Prisons in the 2000s, wrote after Archer's death that the diaries did "occasionally accurately captur[e] the reality and pain of imprisonment", but that they were marred by untruths and a lurid exaggeration of what Archer portrayed as hellish conditions in Belmarsh.
