= Perfect Gentleman =

Perfect Gentleman may refer to:

- A Perfect Gentleman (1927 film), a Swedish silent drama film
- A Perfect Gentleman (1928 film), an American silent comedy film
- The Perfect Gentleman (film), a 1935 film starring Frank Morgan
- "The Perfect Gentleman" (short story), a 1980 short story by Jeffrey Archer
- "Perfect Gentleman" (Helloween song), 1994
- "Perfect Gentleman" (Wyclef Jean song), 2001

== See also ==
- Perfect Gentlemen, an American R&B trio
- Perfect Gentlemen (film), a 1978 American television film
