= A Twist in the Tale =

A Twist in the Tale or Twist in the Tale may refer to:

== TV ==
- A Twist in the Tale, a New Zealand TV series starring William Shatner
- Quinn Martin's Tales of the Unexpected, a 1977 American television show known in the UK as Twist in the Tale

== Others ==
- A Twist in the Tale (book), a collection of short stories by Jeffrey Archer
- "A Twist in the Tale", a song by Deep Purple from The Battle Rages On
