= Sheppey (play) =

1933 play by William Somerset Maugham

First edition (publ. Heinemann)

Sheppey (1933) was William Somerset Maugham's last play, written at the age of 59 and after he had reached distinction as a novelist and playwright. Maugham dedicated the book to Sir John Gielgud.

It is the story about the change of fortune of hairdresser Joseph Miller who was born on the Isle of Sheppey, Kent and nicknamed "Sheppey." The play is set in the 1930s. Sheppey, a hard worker at the same establishment for 15 years, wins a subsidiary prize in the Irish Lottery of £8,500 but does not take to his win with the same style that most others would – and to which most, including his boss, his wife or his daughter and her fiancé (a teacher given to believing that he is more educated than most) – expect him to.

The play was written in 1932 and first produced at the Wyndham's Theatre London on 14 September 1933 with a cast that included Ralph Richardson, then aged 31, and Laura Cowie who had been a star of the silent movies.

Following the production of Sheppey, Maugham publicly declared that he would write no more plays, a promise he kept until his death in 1965. Nevertheless, he continued to write numerous short stories, novels, articles, and other works.

== Outline of the plot ==
Joseph "Sheppey" Miller, a hairdresser, suddenly wins £8,500 in the Irish Lottery. He considers buying land overlooking the sea on the Isle of Sheppey with the money.

Sheppey's wife, Mrs. Miller, believes she will benefit from the assistance of a charwoman to do housework. Florrie, his daughter, quits her work in the city so that she can speed up the proposed marriage date to her fiancé Ernie.

Ernie believes his proximity to Sheppey's money will improve his social standing, allowing him to run for parliament, with goals of eventually becoming Prime Minister of the United Kingdom.

Sheppey's employer of 15 years, Mr. Bradley, believes that Sheppey will now buy into his hairdressing salon.

Sheppey attends the court case of a thief, and empathizes with the defendant. Inspired by this, as well as a reading of The Bible, he decides to use his winnings for charity.

He takes a street prostitute on hard times into his house, and he welcomes also to his home the thief who he met in court.

The thief and the prostitute soon leave the home, indicating that they prefer to thieve and to solicit.

His family concoct a plan to have him seen by a psychiatrist in the hope that he is found "potty" and cannot give more of their money away. The psychiatrist agrees that Sheppey is indeed "potty."

The play ends with Death visiting Sheppey. Sheppey tells Death:

I wish now I'd gone down to the Isle of Sheppey when the doctor advised it. You wouldn't 'ave thought of looking for me there.

Death replies:

There was a merchant in Baghdad who sent his servant to market to buy provisions and in a little while the servant came back, white and trembling, and said, Master, just now when I was in the marketplace I was jostled by a woman in the crowd and when I turned I saw it was Death that jostled me. She looked at me and made a threatening gesture; now, lend me your horse, and I will ride away from this city and avoid my fate. I will go to Samarra and there Death will not find me. The merchant lent him his horse, and the servant mounted it, and he dug his spurs in its flanks and as fast as the horse could gallop he went. Then the merchant went down to the market-place and he saw me standing in the crowd and he came to me and said, Why did you make a threatening gesture to my servant when you saw him this morning? That was not a threatening gesture, I said, it was only a start of surprise. I was astonished to see him in Baghdad, for I had an appointment with him tonight in Samarra.

== Influence of the play on other writers ==
John O'Hara was prompted by Maugham's Sheppey inclusion of the scene with Death to title his influential book Appointment in Samarra. He directly acknowledges Maugham in the foreword to the 1953 edition of his book.

Jeffrey Archer in his book To Cut a Long Story Short includes the Maugham version word for word. His preface to the book directly credits John O'Hara and Somerset Maugham as the source for this version, although he is aware that the story is much older, deriving from ancient Middle Eastern sources.

At one point in Peter Bogdanovich's 1968 film Targets, Boris Karloff's character recites Maugham's version of the story almost word for word (describing Death in the third person, but including the same details of the servant's flight).

A modified version of the story is told in "The Six Thatchers" (2017), the first episode of the fourth series of the British television programme Sherlock. The servant is absent from the tale; it is instead the merchant who has the nighttime appointment with Death in Samarra after being startled to see Death that morning in the Baghdad market.

The story was the inspiration for a thought experiment from Allan Gibbard and William Harper's influential paper "Counterfactuals and Two Kinds of Expected Utility". The thought experiment has come to be known as "Death in Damascus". In Gibbard and Harper's retelling, the cities are changed from Baghdad and Samarra to Aleppo and Damascus.
