= Old Love =

Old Love may refer to:

- Old Love (story), a 1980 short story by Jeffrey Archer
- "Old Love / New Love", a song by Twin Shadow
- An Old Love, an East German black-and-white film directed by Frank Beyer
- Old Love, a novel by Isaac Bashevis Singer
- "Old Love", a song by Eric Clapton from Journeyman
- "Old Love", a 1969 song by The Intruders
- "Old Love", a song by Joe Hertler & The Rainbow Seekers
- "Old Love", a song by Michele Brourman and Amanda McBroom
