= Jeremy Child =

English child actor (1944–2022)

- Born: Coles John Jeremy Child; 20 September 1944; Woking, Surrey, England
- Died: 7 March 2022 (aged 77)
- Occupation: Actor
- Years active: 1967–2017
- Spouses: Deborah Grant (m. 1971; div. 1976) Jan Todd (m. 1978; div. 1987) Elizabeth Morgan (m. 1987)
- Children: 5

Sir Coles John Jeremy Child, 3rd Baronet (20 September 1944 – 7 March 2022) was a British actor.

== Early life ==
Coles John Jeremy Child was born on 20 September 1944 in Woking, Surrey, son of Foreign Office diplomat Sir Coles John Child, 2nd Baronet, DL, a Major in the Coldstream Guards and aide-de-camp to the Governor General and Commander-in-Chief of Canada from 1931 to 1933, and Sheila, daughter of Hugh Mathewson, of Pine Avenue, Montreal, Quebec, Canada. The Coles family were lords of the manor of Bromley, and lived at Bromley Palace. He was educated at Wellesley House School, a preparatory school in the coastal town of Broadstairs in Kent and at Eton College and Aiglon College, then spent a year at Poitiers University, followed by training as an actor at the Bristol Old Vic Theatre School.

== Career ==
Having for a short time been a "reluctant" City broker, after appearing in repertory theatre, Child was cast in a significant role in the 1967 film Privilege. Following this appearance, he played over 90 different roles in films and television, including a small role in the film Quadrophenia; as Piers Leigh in the miniseries Edward & Mrs. Simpson; as one of the main villains in Bird of Prey; as Tory politician Charles Gurney Seymour in the television adaptation of Jeffrey Archer's First Among Equals, and a cameo in A Fish Called Wanda. From 1977 to 1978, he appeared in the second series of Backs to the Land. He also played a typical officer-class role in Fairly Secret Army (1984–86).

Child appeared in the 2004 film Wimbledon and television drama Judge John Deed. He also appeared in Doctors for one episode, and most recently appeared as David Walsh in EastEnders. Child played the British Foreign Secretary three times in his career.

== Politics ==
In 1993, Child appeared in a party political broadcast for the Labour Party which also starred Hugh Laurie and Stephen Fry.

== Personal life ==
Child was married three times, his first wife being the actress Deborah Grant, by whom he had a daughter. His second wife was Jan Todd, by whom he had a son and a daughter. He had a daughter and a son from his third marriage to publisher Elizabeth Morgan. He lived in Ewelme, Oxfordshire. Child died after a long illness on 7 March 2022, at the age of 77.

== Filmography ==
Year	Title	Role	Notes
1967	Privilege	Martin Crossley	
1968	Decline and Fall... of a Birdwatcher	Nigel	
1969	Play Dirty	2nd Lieutenant	
1969	Oh! What a Lovely War	Wealthy Young Man	Uncredited
1969	The Gladiators	B-1	
1970	The Breaking of Bumbo	Billy	
1970	Jane Eyre	Harry Lynn	TV movie
1971	Quest for Love	Dougie Raynes	Uncredited
1972	Doomwatch	David Broome	
1972	Young Winston	Austen Chamberlain	Uncredited
1972	All Star Comedy Carnival	Timothy Tanner (Father, Dear Father), sketch	
1972–73	Father, Dear Father	Timothy Tanner	7 episodes
1973	Ooh, La La	Corignon	1 episode. (broadcast '68-'73)
1975	The Sweeney	Elphick	1 episode
1975	Days of Hope	Selwyn Davies	1 episode of mini-series
1976	The Glittering Prizes	John Cadman	3 episodes
1976	The New Avengers	Lieutenant	1 episode
1976	Emily (The Awakening of Emily)	Gerald	
1977	Hardcore	Tenniel	
1977	Wings	Lieutenant Peter Conrad	3 episodes
1978	The Stud	Lawyer	
1979	Quadrophenia	Agency Man	
1980	Sir Henry at Rawlinson End	Peregrine Maynard	
1980	Tis Pity She's a Whore	Priest	BBC TV Movie
1981	Chanel Solitaire		Uncredited
1983	High Road to China	Silversmith	
1984	Give My Regards to Broad Street	Record Company Executive 1	
1988	Taffin	Martin	
1988	A Fish Called Wanda	Mr Johnson	
1993	Harnessing Peacocks	Julian Reeves	TV movie
1994	The Madness of King George	Black Rod	
1997	Regeneration	Balfour Graham	
1999	Whatever Happened to Harold Smith?	Doctor Bannister	
2001	Lagaan	Maj. Cotton	
2001	South Kensington	Camilla's Father	
2002	Midsomer Murders	Anthony Talbot	Episode: "Murder on St. Malley's Day"
2002	Safe Conduct	Jeremy	
2004	Wimbledon	Fred Pilger	
2005	Separate Lies	Angus Burrell	
2011	Foster	John Burns	
2011	The Iron Lady	Cabinet Minister	
2017	Darkest Hour	Lord Stanhope	

Baronetage of the United Kingdom
Preceded by Coles John Child	Baronet (of Bromley Place); 1971–2022	Succeeded by Coles John Alexander Child
