= Shepherd Market =

Small precinct in Mayfair in the West End of London

Coordinates: 51.5065°N 0.1468°W

- Shepherd Market (City of Westminster) (local authority since 1965)
- Type: Garden square
- Length: 110 ft (34 m) larger, eastern square, which flanks a café/restaurant/hairdresser/boutique/small business lined, non-parking cul-de-sac/deliveries road.
- Width: 445 feet (136 m)
- Area: Mayfair
- Location: London
- Postal code: W1
- Nearest metro station: Green Park tube station

Construction
- Construction start: 1735
- Completion: 1736

Other
- Status: west end of the north side: large building: Grade I listed

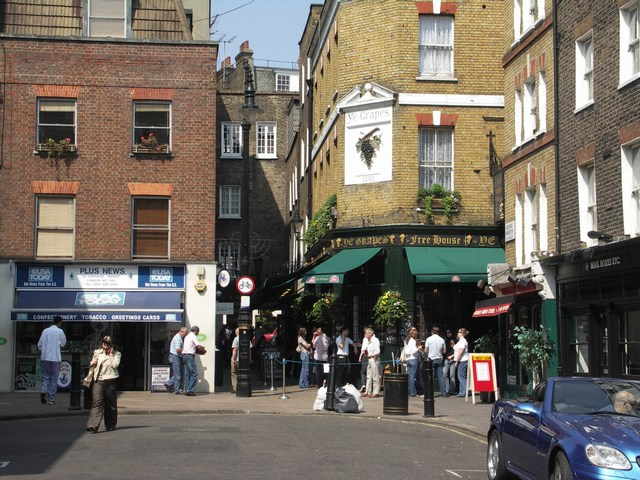
Ye Grapes pub and 28 Shepherd Market

Shepherd Market is a small precinct in Mayfair, in the West End of London. Its two business-lined squares are between Piccadilly and Curzon Street; it has a village-like atmosphere. It was built up between 1735 and 1746 by Edward Shepherd on the open ground then used for the annual fair from which Mayfair derives its name. In the 1920s, it hosted leading writers and artists such as Anthony Powell, Michael Arlen and Sophie Fedorovitch. It was associated with upmarket prostitutes until at least the 1980s. Jeffrey Archer met Monica Coghlan (Note: whilst she was working as a prostitute) there in the 1980s.

== History ==
The square was fully built up between 1735 and 1746 by Edward Shepherd from an open area called Brook Field, through which flowed the Tyburn, and where a May fair was held, from which the surrounding area of Mayfair derives its name. A local architect, he was commissioned to develop the site and work was completed in the mid-18th century. It contained paved alleys, a duck pond, and a two-storey market topped by a theatre.

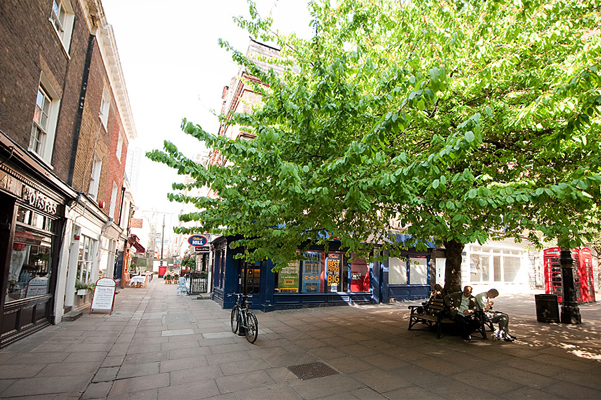
Shepherd Market

During the 1920s this was a rundown area, popular with writers and artists such as Michael Arlen and Sophie Fedorovitch. Arlen rented rooms opposite The Grapes public house and used the public place as the setting for his best-selling 1924 novel The Green Hat, which prompted Anthony Powell to move into the area in 1926.

It has been associated with upmarket prostitutes from its building up until at least the 1980s. When Olivia Manning and her husband Reggie Smith lived at 50a, she found the prostitutes "fascinating". In the 1980s, the then deputy Conservative Party chairman and author Jeffrey Archer allegedly met the prostitute Monica Coghlan in Shepherd Market.

In October 2025 it was announced that a walkway to Mayfair's Shepherd Market opened for first time in 300 years.

== Geography ==
Shepherd Market is between Piccadilly and Curzon Street in Mayfair. As a street it is 400 feet (120 m) long. The Curzon Mayfair Cinema stands at its eastern end, and the transition to residential street: Market Mews, where at right-angles crosses Hertford Street.

== Notes and references ==
Footnotes

Citations
