= First Among Equals (TV series) =

Television series based on First Among Equals by Jeffrey Archer

- Genre: Political drama
- Based on: First Among Equals by Jeffrey Archer
- Written by: Derek Marlowe
- Directed by: Brian Mills
- Starring: Jeremy Child; James Faulkner; David Robb; Tom Wilkinson
- Theme music composer: Richard Harvey
- Country of origin: United Kingdom
- Original language: English
- No. of episodes: 10

Production
- Producer: Mervyn Watson
- Editors: John Bocking; D. L. Heyes
- Running time: 494 minutes
- Production company: Granada Television

Original release
- Network: ITV
- Release: 30 September – 2 December 1986

First Among Equals is a ten-part serial based on Jeffrey Archer's 1984 novel of the same name, produced by Granada Television for the ITV network and first shown in 1986.

== Plot ==
The series follows the careers and personal lives of four fictional British politicians—Simon Kerslake, MP for Coventry Central and later Pucklebridge; Charles Seymour, MP for Sussex Downs; Raymond Gould, MP for Leeds North; and Andrew Fraser, MP for Edinburgh Carlton—from 1964 to 1991, with each vying to become Prime Minister.

Several situations in the novel are drawn from Archer's own early political career in the British House of Commons. While the novel depicts the fictional characters interacting with actual political figures from the UK and elsewhere (including Winston Churchill, Alec Douglas-Home, Harold Wilson, Edward Heath, Margaret Thatcher, Douglas Hurd, Colonel Gaddafi, Gary Hart and Queen Elizabeth II), this adaptation uses different names for the real-life politicians.

== Cast of characters ==
Actor	Character
James Faulkner	Simon Kerslake
Jeremy Child	Charles Gurney Seymour
Tom Wilkinson	Raymond Gould
David Robb	Andrew Fraser

The serial used different names for real-life politicians:

Book	TV
Harold Wilson	George Bainbridge
Edward Heath	Henry Lindsey
Reginald Maudling	Christopher Morland
Margaret Thatcher	Hilary Turner
James Callaghan	Kenneth Hollander
Neil Kinnock	Owen Hughes

== Title ==
The title of both the novel and the serial is a literal translation of the Latin term primus inter pares, a term used to refer to either the most senior member of a group of equals (peers) or to refer to someone who claims to be just one member of a group of equals when in reality he or she completely dominates said group. This phrase is used to describe the official constitutional status of the British Prime Minister within his Cabinet.

== Production ==
Sequences set in the fictional Northumbrian constituency of Redfern were actually filmed much closer to Granada studios in Lancashire at Entwistle railway station, and at the Barlow Institute, Edgworth.

Granada constructed a full-scale replica set of the House of Commons chamber for the production, which for many years formed a central part of their Granada Studios Tour attraction, where visitors could see mock debates being performed on the set by actors. The set was also often used by other television productions wanting to set scenes in the Commons chamber, and in 2002 was purchased by the scriptwriter Paul Abbott so that it could be used in his BBC drama serial State of Play. Abbott, himself a former Granada Television staff writer, bought it personally as the set would otherwise have been destroyed and he feared it would take too long to get the necessary money from the BBC. He currently keeps it in storage in Oxford.
