= The Fourth Estate (novel) =

Novel by Jeffrey Archer

- First edition (UK)
- Author: Jeffrey Archer
- Language: English
- Publisher: HarperCollins
- Publication date: May 1996
- Publication place: United Kingdom
- Pages: 549
- ISBN: 0-00-225318-6
- OCLC: 34704972
- Dewey Decimal: 823/.914 20
- LC Class: PR6051.R285 F68 1996

The Fourth Estate is a 1996 novel by Jeffrey Archer. It chronicles the lives of two media barons, Richard Armstrong and Keith Townsend, from their starkly contrasting childhoods to their ultimate battle to build the world's biggest media empire. The book is based on two real life media barons – Robert Maxwell and Rupert Murdoch, who fought to control the newspaper market in Britain. (Murdoch had bought The Sun and News of the World and later Times Newspapers Ltd and Maxwell bought the Daily Mirror and the other newspapers in its group.).

The concept of the fourth estate is in essence the press as a watchdog on other powerful institutions or "estates", the original three estates in England and later the United Kingdom being the Lords Spiritual (of the Church of England), the Lords Temporal, and the commons. The fourth estate is charged with keeping an honest watch on activities of the other states and itself. These duties would help democratic societies function properly, openly, and honestly. Debate still flourishes as to whether or not this ever operated (or operates) as it was intended.

It also shows a battle between two strong characters from differing backgrounds, who are willing to take endless risks.

== Plot ==
Lubji Hoch, the son of an illiterate Czech Jewish peasant, escapes the Nazis, changes his name to Richard Armstrong, and becomes a decorated British Army officer. After the war he is posted to Berlin as head of press relations in the British sector. He appropriates a floundering newspaper, his entrée to the business of publishing. On his return to the UK, he builds a publishing empire.

On the other side of the world, in Australia, Keith Townsend, son of a millionaire newspaper owner, is groomed to follow in his father's footsteps. Private schools, an Oxford degree, and a position at a London newspaper prepare him to take over the family business. He quickly becomes the leading newspaper publisher in Australia.

As Armstrong and Townsend battle to seize control of existing publishers on the world stage, they become fierce competitors. Hubris and overreach finally lead to financial disaster and tragic consequences.

== Responses ==
Sarah Lyall, in The New York Times, thought the work contained "leaden dialogue", but despite the "tantalizing echoes" of Armstrong and Townsend's real life models, the two men "seem about as vivid as bureaucrats in a wire-service story". Hugo Barnacle found evidence of a "dry sense of humour", but asserted that "Archer doesn't do insight or atmosphere, and gives the imagination very few cues."

== Analogies ==
Many of the things in The Fourth Estate are based on real things. The following are some of the notable examples.

People
Fourth Estate	Real life
Richard Armstrong	Robert Maxwell
> Born with surname Hoch	Same
> Briefly named himself after a brand of cigarette	Named himself John Player after a brand of cigarette
Keith Townsend	Keith Rupert Murdoch
> Relationship with flight attendant	Married flight attendant Patricia Booker
> Married cub reporter Kate	Married reporter Anna Maria Torv

Publications
Fourth Estate	Real life	Role
the Globe	News of the World	Battle for ownership
the Continent	The Australian	Established to Australia's answer to the London Times
