= Old Love (story) =

1980 short story by Jeffrey Archer

- Short story by Jeffrey Archer
- Country: United Kingdom
- Language: English

Publication
- Publisher: Hodder & Stoughton

"Old Love" is a short story written by English author Jeffrey Archer. Published in 1980 in Archer's A Quiver Full of Arrows by Hodder & Stoughton, it is the tale of two undergraduates at Oxford in the 1930s and their bitter rivalry that ends in a tragic love story.

In 1985, Richard Bennett directed a TV movie titled Love Song, based on the story; two years later he directed a play of the same name and also based on the story.

== Plot ==
The story follows two students, William Thatcher and Philippa Jameson, of English literature from Oxford in the 1930s. They both fell in enmity with each other in their first sight. The mutual hatred began a fierce sense of competition between them which enabled them to outshine their contemporaries, but to remain neck-to-neck with each other. The mutual loathing gave way to the epithet "that silly woman" to Phillippa and "that arrogant man" to William. They equally loved each other but never showed up at all.

They always used to fight against a topic. both excelled as toppers in their final degree exam: The Charles Oldham essay on Shakespeare competition and they both won it.

In between, Philippa's father's death brought them closer and they fell in love. After the marriage, legend has it that they were never apart for more than a few hours. They had their honeymoon in Athens which ended up in a heated argument over the relative significance of Doric and Ionic architecture.

They were both equally talented in their fields of interests and when Phillippa was made a Dame, William was also Knighted.

Philippa's most irritating habit, to William, was her determination each morning to complete "The Times" crossword before he arrived at the breakfast table. One fine morning in June before their retirement, William, studying the clue, filled in the eight boxes left incomplete by Philippa. Philippa instantly retorted that there was no such word. To her delight, the word whymwham could not be found in the shorter Oxford Dictionary. William assured her that the word could be found in OED on his desk, which is made for scholars like him, and left for college.

Having closed the front door, as she entered the kitchen, Philippa suddenly suffered a heart attack. Heart attacks in women were less common compared to men. She called out to William in vain. The news of her death was conveyed and the story ends with Sir William's suicide note (he shot himself with his pistol): "Forgive me, but I had to let her know". There was the volume of the work of John Skelton held open in one of his hand with the word Whym Wham underlined neatly, his fingers stiff and cold around it.

And as "the legend has it, they were never apart for more than a few hours" even in their deaths.

== Reception ==
On May 10, 1987, Love Song, a two-part Masterpiece Theater presentation, was produced based on the story, Michael Kitchen as William and Diana Hardcastle as Phillippa. The play was produced by Richard Bennett

In 2008, Indian filmmaker Subhash Ghai called this short story "his all-time favourite love story" and "a beautiful book for any die-hard romantic."

On May 2, 2015, Kansas based The Big Bang Theater performed Marathi adaption of Old Love called Priya Ulka: Fakta Tujhyasathi at Regnier Hall Auditorium at KU Edwards Campus. The Marathi adaption of the story is written by Dr. Priyadarshan Manohar. The play was directed by Dr. Udayan Apte.

== In education ==
In 2013, the short story was prescribed by Indian School Certificate (ISC) as a possible addition in the English syllabus for ISC examination of classes, eleven and twelve. Later the story was confirmed to be used for enlightening students appearing in ISC examinations of 2015 onwards.
