= This Was a Man (Jeffrey Archer) =

2016 novel by Jeffrey Archer

- First edition (UK)
- Author: Jeffrey Archer
- Language: English
- Series: Clifton Chronicles (Book 7)
- Published: 8 November 2016
- Publisher: Macmillan (UK); St. Martin's Press (US)
- Publication place: United Kingdom
- Media type: Print (hardcover, paperback), audio, eBook
- Pages: 416
- ISBN: 978-1447252245
- Preceded by: Cometh the Hour (2016)

This Was a Man is the seventh and final novel in Jeffrey Archer's Clifton Chronicles. This series follows the events of the fictitious Clifton and Barrington families, starting in the 1920s and ending in 1992.

== Plot ==
This Was a Man continues the story of the Clifton family. Karin appears to have been executed by her Russian handler after being found out as a double agent. Harry sets out to write his literary masterpiece. The Barrington shipping empire is sold and Emma ends up helping the government of Margaret Thatcher and joins Giles in the House of Lords. Sebastian gets promoted to run the banking business in which he has worked for years. His daughter Jessica does well as an art student, but nearly loses all in a disastrous change of course. Giles has a very successful career in the Lords, only to see his future dashed. And Lady Virginia still gets into and out of one mess after another through her schemes.

== Critical reception ==
The book was number five on The New York Times Bestseller List in late 2016.

The Real Book Spy website really liked this book, saying, "There isn’t a better storyteller alive than Mr. Archer, and This Was A Man is his finest work to date."

A book review by Stephanie Jones in The Coast website said "while Archer aficionados are likely to be sated, readers seeking a more engrossing and rewarding multipart epic might turn to" a couple of series of other contemporary authors.
