= Only Time Will Tell (novel) =

2011 novel by Jeffrey Archer

- First edition (UK)
- Author: Jeffrey Archer
- Language: English
- Series: Clifton Chronicles (Book 1)
- Publisher: Macmillan (UK); St. Martin's Press (US)
- Publication place: United Kingdom
- Media type: Print (Hardcover, Paperback), Audio, eBook
- Pages: 400
- ISBN: 978-0-230-74822-4
- OCLC: 707969370
- Followed by: The Sins of the Father

Only Time Will Tell is a first part of the seven in the Clifton Chronicles by Jeffrey Archer. The book was published worldwide in 2011. It was launched by Jeffrey Archer himself in Bangalore, India in March 2011, as the beginning of a global book tour.

== Plot ==
The plot revolves around the protagonist Harry Clifton, spanning the time between the end of World War I and the beginning of the Second World War. The novel is set in Bristol, England, from 1919 to 1940 and centers around Harry Clifton, a young boy destined to follow in the footsteps of his father and uncle and work on the docks until a new world is opened up to him. Harry has the gift of song, and when Miss Monday, the choir mistress; Mr. Holcombe, his elementary school teacher; and Old Jack Tar, a Boer War hero and loner all help him, his life is changed forever. Harry's mother, Maisie, works as a waitress and scrimps and saves to send her son to school and give him a better life.

Maisie's sacrifices and the secret of Harry's parentage are the main focus of Only Time Will Tell. Harry has grown up thinking Arthur Clifton is his father and that he died in the war. Maisie knows the truth about Harry's parentage, and a few people know the truth about Arthur Clifton's death, but no one tells Harry anything.

While Harry is off at school befriending Giles Barrington, the son of the man who owns the shipping company where Harry's father and uncle work and who knows what happened to Arthur Clifton, Maisie deals with countless personal tragedies and must make some tough decisions to continue Harry's schooling. At the same time, it looks as though England may go to war with Germany, and Harry must consider what this means for his future. He also has insights of his past that may affect his future.

== Reception ==
The novel quickly became a bestseller, reaching number one a day after its release. All the copy of books were sold out the day it was launched by Archer in India.

== Characters ==
- Harry Clifton - The protagonist of the book.
- Maisie Clifton - Harry's mother who after sudden death of her husband Arthur, tries to make ends meet to support her family and Harry's education.
- Captain Jack Tarrant, VC (a.k.a. "Old Jack Tar") - Is supposedly based on 2 or 3 real life people including General Tommy McPherson. A Boer War veteran who saved the life of his fellow officers and men, he is decorated with the Victoria Cross for his services, but is left permanently scarred by having killed 11 Boer soldiers to earn the medal, and cuts himself off from the world, eventually being persuaded to accept a job as a night watchman in the Barrington shipyards by his former lieutenant, Sir Walter Barrington, whose life he saved. He takes up residence in the shipyard, in an old railway carriage.
- Mr Holcombe - Harry's first teacher at Merrywood Elementary school
- Mr Frobisher - Harry's house master at St Bede's
- Sir Walter Barrington - The patriarch of the Barrington family. A god-fearing man.
- Hugo Barrington - Son of Sir Walter. Referred to by Old Jack Tar as "A man not cut out of the same cloth as his father." Also the antagonist in the book. Creates obstacles in Harry's life.
- Elizabeth Barrington - Hugo's wife and Giles' and Emma's mother.
- Lord Harvey - Elizabeth's father. Owns a manor in Scotland.
- Algernon Deakins - Harry's friend throughout school life
- Giles Barrington - Harry's best friend and Hugo's son.
- Emma Barrington - Giles' sister and Harry's lover.
- Stan Tancock - Maisie Clifton's brother and Arthur Clifton's best friend and co-worker, a high-functioning alcoholic.
