= Sons of Fortune =

Novel by Jeffrey Archer

- First edition cover
- Author: Jeffrey Archer
- Publisher: Macmillan
- Publication date: 2002
- ISBN: 978-1-405-02079-4

Sons of Fortune (ISBN 1-4050-2079-2) is a 2002 novel by English author Jeffrey Archer. Its working title was In the Lap of the Gods.

== Plot summary ==
Sons of Fortune talks about twin brothers who got parted in a cinematic consequence and grown up without knowing the existence of each other. In late 1940s in Hartford, Connecticut a set of twins who are separated at birth by a millionaire couple's nurse, after the millionaire couple's child - born the same day - dies of cot death in the hospital and she secretly switches Peter for the dead Fletcher Davenport. Nat Cartwright goes to home with his parents, a school teacher and an insurance salesman. But his twin brother is to begin days as Fletcher Andrew Davenport (according to chapter 2), the only son of a multi millionaire and his society wife.

During the years that follow, the two brothers grow up unaware of each other's existence. Even when Nat and Fletcher fall in love with same girl, Diane, they still don't meet but continue on their separate paths, owing to the efforts taken by the multi-millionaire's nurse.

Both complete their graduation. Nat leaves the college at the University of Connecticut to serve in the Vietnam War. He returns a war hero, having received the Medal of Honor for his actions in Vietnam, finishes school and becomes a successful currency banker. Fletcher, meanwhile, has graduated from Yale University and distinguishes himself as a criminal defense lawyer, before he is elected as a state senator for the Democratic Party.

They know of each other by reputation. Cartwright marries a Korean computer whiz, Su Ling, an illegal immigrant, whom he meets in college. Fletcher marries his best friend's sister Annie, whom he falls in love with at first sight when they are in their teens.

During the years, both men find themselves opposed by the machinations of the untrustworthy Ralph Elliot, who went to school with Nat, slept with his girlfriend and is his personal nemesis. Although their lives (common acquaintances and enemies, Fletcher saving the life of Nat's son during a school hostage situation) are interconnected, they never meet. However, their paths finally cross when they both decide to run for governor of Connecticut and Fletcher agrees to defend Nat on the charge of murdering his Republican primary opponent Ralph Elliot for leaking information about his wife and mother-in-law that leads to the suicide of his only child.

Family members comment on similarities between the two, but no one ever connects the dots, until the end, because, after all, they are not identical twins. The truth is revealed to them when a potentially fatal car accident by Fletcher reveals that they share the same rare blood type. Nat donates his blood to save Fletcher. As Fletcher was hospitalized in the clinic where he was born, the attending doctor then finds secret documents which reveals that the obstetrician had the suspicions that the twins were switched at birth. In yet another plot twist, the twins choose to keep the blood link a secret. However, their wives guess this on the day of the election and mutually agree to keep it a secret.

Knowing all this, they both still run for governor of Connecticut in 1992. On election day, after several rounds of counting the votes the result is still tied. The winner was ultimately appointed by the toss of a coin. After the toss, when both men stand to the left and right of the mayor to represent their parties, the mayor turns to his right to congratulate the new governor. Through clues in the book regarding their place alongside the mayor and who called heads, one can deduct that the winner is Fletcher. In the end, Fletcher definitely wins and becomes the governor as before the toss, Fletcher was to the left of the mayor. After the toss, the mayor picks up the coin and "turned" and then congratulated the man who was now to his right (Fletcher). Also Fletcher always said heads, so at that time too he must be the one who said heads.

Jeffrey Archer also confirmed in Twitter that it was Fletcher. Chapter 31 starts by saying Fletcher always liked to call heads.

Several aspects of the plot, as well as specific incidents such as the toss of the coin, also occur in a previous book he wrote - First Among Equals, which is a power struggle between four politicians for the prime ministership of the UK.

== Reception ==
The book was generally poorly reviewed. Publishers Weekly noted that it was written while Archer was in prison for perjury, "so readers can perhaps forgive him if this latest effort falls short of his usual standard," being "implausibly plotted" with "thin" characters. For their part, Kirkus Reviews said it was "Flat, bland, covered in wastelands of cliché", and that "Most distressing about this dreary business is not that Archer’s plot points are so ridiculous or contrived, but that he fails to make it at all entertaining."
