= The Sins of the Father (Archer novel) =

Book by Jeffrey Archer

Only Time Will Tell
- First edition (UK)
- Author: Jeffrey Archer
- Language: English
- Series: Clifton Chronicles (Book 2)
- Publisher: Macmillan (UK); St. Martin's Press (US)
- Publication place: United Kingdom
- Media type: Print (Hardcover, Paperback), Audio, eBook
- Pages: 400
- ISBN: 978-0-230-74823-1
- OCLC: 759574624
- Preceded by: Only Time Will Tell
- Followed by: Best Kept Secret

The Sins of the Father is the second of the seven parts of the Clifton Chronicles by British author Jeffrey Archer. The book was published worldwide in 2012.

== Plot ==
Harry Clifton has joined the American Navy and has assumed the identity of Tom Bradshaw after his ship sinks in order to solve some of his problems, never knowing that he will end up in prison to serve Bradshaw's sentence for desertion. In prison he meets Pat Quinn, from whom he quickly starts learning prison trades. After hard work, he ends up as the prison librarian and begins writing The Diary of a Convict. Back in England, Wallace informs everyone about the death and later the burial of Harry at sea.

Emma, who is Giles's sister, is Harry's girlfriend and goes to meet Maisie, Harry's Mother. While the letter by Tom Bradshaw (Harry) is lying on Maisie's mantelpiece, Emma recognizes the handwriting and believes that Harry is still alive. Not allowed to open the letter, she sets out to find Harry. She works on Kansas Star, the ship in which Harry was saved, and from there, she gets to know about the people Tom Bradshaw was with in his last moments. On visiting their home, she realize that Harry himself is Tom and is now in prison.

Harry meanwhile writes a diary about his time in prison. When one of his fellow inmates, Max Lloyd, is released, he requests Harry to keep sending him diaries as he enjoys reading them a lot. Max publishes them in his own name. Emma reads the 'Diary of a Convict' and recognizes Harry's handiwork. She begins to try and meet him in prison but the warden says that Harry/Tom has been mysteriously transferred. Harry and Pat are recruited by the US army to cause mayhem behind enemy lines.

Giles joins the army and is captured by Germans. He manages to escape but a fellow soldier who was his close friend is killed. He is awarded the Military Cross.

Maisie marries Mr Holcombe who was Harry's teacher at Merrywood. Hugo, Harry's real father, fathers an illegitimate child and tries to attack Olga, who is the mother. Olga confronts him with the child, but he refuses to accept the child as his, and proceeds to attack her when she starts to blackmail him. Olga kills him in self-defense and later commits suicide, leaving behind the child.

Emma seeks the help of her Great-aunt Phyllis in New York and her son Alistair who is a lawyer. She learns of Harry's recruitment in the army.

Harry and Pat are successful in fighting behind enemy lines against the Germans, but Harry is severely injured and Pat is killed when they drive over a land mine. Harry is sent back home to England where he reunites with Emma, Giles and the whole family. The case of Harry v. Giles as to who inherits the title and inheritance as Hugo is dead is taken up by the press. Harry doesn't want the inheritance or the title, he just wants to be with Emma. The last scene in the book is of the House Of Lords adjourning as the resultant vote had been drawn; the book ends with a cliffhanger as the Lord Chancellor announces that he would present his judgment as to who will receive the Barrington fortune the next morning.

== Background ==
The book serves as a sequel to Only Time Will Tell, the first part of the Clifton Chronicles. It was followed by Best Kept Secret, published in March 2013.

== Characters ==
1. Harry Clifton - The main protagonist of the book.
2. Maisie Clifton - Harry's Mother.
3. Emma Barrington - Giles' sister and Harry's love.
4. Giles Barrington - Harry's best friend and Hugo's son.
5. Pat Quinn - Harry's mate in prison.
6. Hugo Barrington - Emma and Giles's father.
7. Phyllis Stuart - Emma's Great Aunt, Sister of Lord Harvey.
8. Alistair Stuart - Phyllis's son.
9. Sefton Jelks - Harry's lawyer.
10. Terry Bates - Giles' friend while serving in the army.
11. Sir Walter Barrington - Father of Hugo Barrington and Grandfather of Emma, Giles and Grace

== Sequel ==
A sequel to this book, Best Kept Secret (Book 3 of the Clifton Chronicles) was launched in March 2013.
