= Best Kept Secret (novel) =

2013 novel by Jeffrey Archer

- First edition (UK)
- Author: Jeffrey Archer
- Language: English
- Series: Clifton Chronicles (Book 3)
- Publisher: Macmillan (UK); St. Martin's Press (US)
- Publication date: 14 March 2013
- Publication place: United Kingdom
- Media type: Print (Hardcover, Paperback), Audio, eBook
- Pages: 400 pages
- ISBN: 978-0-230-74824-8
- OCLC: 828682443
- Preceded by: The Sins of the Father
- Followed by: Be Careful What You Wish For

Best Kept Secret is a 2013 novel by English writer Jeffrey Archer and the third book in his Clifton Chronicles series. The book was released on 14 March 2013 and follows Harry Clifton as he starts a family

== Plot ==
The book picks up after the events in The Sins of the Father, with the House of Lords having to decide who will be the heir to the fortune of Hugo Barrington. The vote ends with a tie, which prompts the Lord Chancellor to vote in favor of Giles Barrington. This leaves Clifton free to marry Emma Barrington and Giles soon falls in love with Lady Virginia, although his family greatly disapproves.

Emma decides to track down the baby found in her father's office on the night of his death and adopts her. Meanwhile, Lady Barrington is diagnosed with terminal cancer and eventually dies. Before her death, it is learned that she had changed the contents of her will to ensure that all her fortune is divided between her daughters. Giles gets none of it, as his mother did not approve of his marrying Lady Virginia in the future. Virginia pushes Giles to contest the will. The judge, however, rules in favor of Emma and Grace. Lady Virginia and Giles were married. Divorce and its aftermath were part of plot throughout the middle of the novel. To get back at Giles, Virginia employs the help of Major Alex Fisher, a long-time enemy of Giles and Harry. He joins the Barrington Shipping company as a member of the Board and tries to bring down the company from the inside using insider stock trading and manipulating certain elections, but eventually fails.

The Parliamentary Elections soon loom and by a combination of stealth and cunning, Fisher gets himself nominated to stand opposite Giles as the Conservative Party nominee. The Clifton family reconciles with Giles during this time, as he is now separated from Lady Virginia. In the election that follows, Fisher is presumed to have won but Sebastian rightly points out that some of the ballot stacks actually hold Giles’ name but had been assigned to Fisher in a case of cheating. The recount declares Giles the winner.

Sebastian returns to school and is focused on gaining admission to Cambridge University. However, he is rusticated because of certain misdemeanors he engages in. On his way back home, his Principal catches him smoking in the first class compartment to London, when he was supposed to be going to Bristol. Feeling certain that his Principal would not permit him to enter Cambridge, he decides to stay at a hotel in London fearing his parents wrath. From there, he visits his friend Bruno Martinez. Bruno's father Don Pedro's life is again an example of the classic Archer story of rags to riches. Don is actually a notorious smuggler and had then been looking for ways to bring counterfeit currency from Argentina to England. He decides to use Sebastian by promising to pay him handsomely if he oversaw the deposition of a sculpture in London from Argentina. Unaware that the base of the sculpture actually held eight million pounds (in fake £5 notes) worth of counterfeit currency, Sebastian agrees to do so.

Meanwhile, Giles and Harry get tipped off about the whereabouts of Sebastian. To help the Cabinet Secretary nab Don Pedro, Harry goes to Argentina in the guise of England captain Peter May. Upon reaching there, he finds out from Sebastian what he was expected to do and informs the Cabinet Secretary, who correctly guesses that the base of the Rodin statue "The Thinker" must actually hold the fake currency. Once the piece reaches England, the authorities send some men to the dockyard to burn the fake money and replace the base. Upon gaining hold of the piece, when Don Pedro finds out that he has been cheated, he assumes Sebastian is behind it and plans to get him killed in a car accident. However, by a twist of fate, his own son ends up in the car with Sebastian on the way to Cambridge and he is left stunned in horror. The novel ends with the tutor of admissions being vested with the responsibility of conveying the news of their son's death to his parents.

== Reception ==
Critical reception for the book was mixed to positive, with the Guardian summarizing it as "Old dog, old tricks." In contrast, the Hindustan Times gave a more positive review, calling it a "potboiler" while also stating it would be a "chart topper". The Sydney Morning Herald and Times Live both gave mostly positive reviews, with the Sydney Morning Herald noting that although the book contained "circumlocutory prattle of needless talk", that it did not ruin their enjoyment of the novel.
