= Mightier Than the Sword =

Book by Jeffrey Archer

Mightier than the Sword
- First edition (UK)
- Author: Jeffrey Archer
- Language: English
- Series: Clifton Chronicles (Book 5)
- Published: 24 February 2015
- Publisher: Macmillan (UK); St. Martin's Press (US)
- Publication place: United Kingdom
- Media type: Print (Hardcover, Paperback), Audio, eBook
- Pages: 400 (Paperback)
- ISBN: 978-0-230-74826-2
- OCLC: 896954030
- Preceded by: Be Careful What You Wish For
- Followed by: Cometh The Hour

Mightier than the Sword is the fifth novel in Jeffrey Archer's Clifton Chronicles. It was published on 24 February 2015. The novel retains the signature story telling style of Jeffrey Archer, where many twists and turns take place while unfolding the story and its characters.

== Sequel ==
The next book, Cometh the Hour was published on February 16, 2016, in the US and February 25, 2016, worldwide.
