= Red herring =

Fallacious approach to mislead an audience

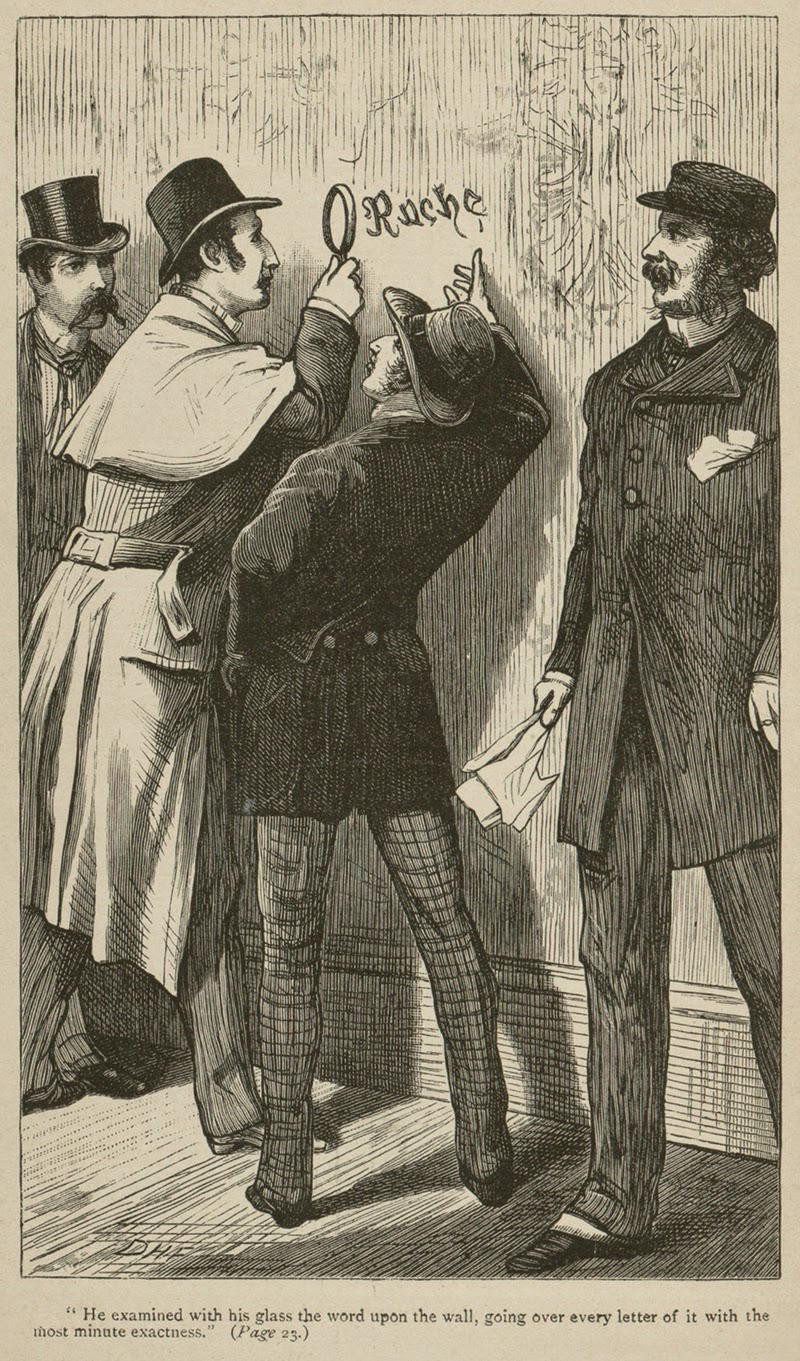
In the mystery novel A Study in Scarlet, the detective Sherlock Holmes examines a clue which is later revealed to be intentionally misleading.

A red herring is something that misleads or distracts from an important question, a relevant argument, or the solving of a mystery or crime. It may be a deliberate literary device that leads readers or audiences toward a false conclusion, typically in order to heighten suspense or to make a plot twist more shocking, as is common in mystery fiction. It may also be a logical fallacy or a rhetorical strategy (e.g., in politics) used in argumentation, either intentionally or unintentionally.

The expression was popularized in 1807 by the English polemicist William Cobbett, who told a story of having used a strong-smelling smoked herring to divert and distract hounds from chasing a rabbit.

== Logical fallacy ==
As an informal fallacy, the red herring falls into a broad class of relevance fallacies. Unlike the straw man, which involves a distortion of the other party's position, the red herring is a seemingly plausible, though irrelevant, diversionary tactic. According to the Oxford English Dictionary, a red herring may be intentional or unintentional; its use is not necessarily a conscious intent to mislead.

The expression is mainly used to assert that an argument is not relevant to the issue being discussed. For example, "I think we should make the academic requirements stricter for students. I recommend you support this because we are in a budget crisis, and we do not want our salaries affected." The second sentence, though used to support the first sentence, does not address its topic.

== Intentional device ==
In fiction and non-fiction, a red herring may be a false clue intended to lead readers or audiences toward a mistaken conclusion. For example, the character of Bishop Aringarosa in Dan Brown's The Da Vinci Code is presented for most of the novel as if he is at the centre of the church's conspiracies, but is later revealed to have been innocently duped by the true antagonist of the story. The character's name is a loose Italian translation of "red herring" (aringa rosa; rosa actually meaning 'pink', and very close to rossa, 'red').

There is a red herring in the first Sherlock Holmes story, A Study in Scarlet, where the murderer writes at the crime scene the word Rache ('revenge' in German), leading the police—and the reader—to mistakenly presume that a German was involved.

A red herring is often used in legal studies and exam problems to mislead and distract students from reaching a correct conclusion about a legal issue, intended as a device that tests students' comprehension of underlying law and their ability to properly discern material factual circumstances.

== History ==
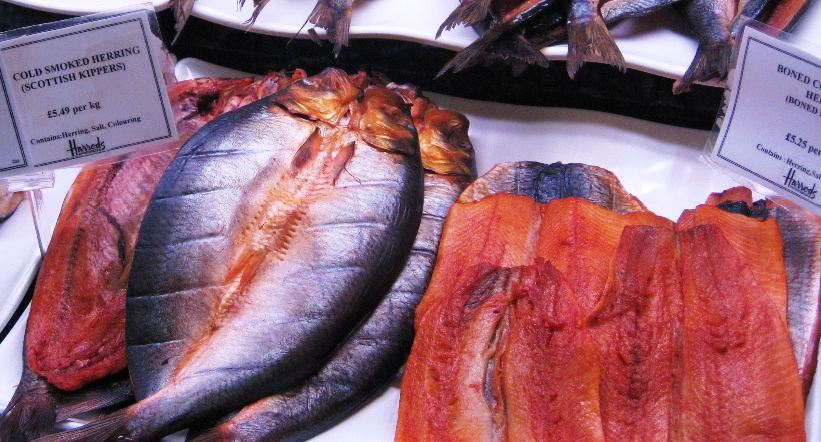
Herrings "kippered" by smoking, salting and artificially dyeing until made reddish-brown, i.e., a "red herring". Prior to the existence of refrigeration, kipper was known for being strongly pungent. In 1807, William Cobbett claimed that he as a child together with other children used a kipper to lead hunting dogs away from the scent of a hare the children intended to hunt—an apocryphal story that was probably the origin of the idiom.

Continental War

When I was a boy, we used [to], in order to draw off the harriers from the trail of a hare that we had set down as our own private property, get to her haunt early in the morning, and drag a red-herring, tied to a string, four or five miles over hedges and ditches, across fields and through coppices, (Note: A coppice, US English copse, is a small group of trees growing very close to each other either naturally or due to being regularly trimmed back to stumps.) till we got to a point, whence we were pretty sure the hunters would not return to the spot where they had [been] thrown off; and, though I would, by no means, be understood, as comparing the editors and proprietors of the London daily press to animals half so sagacious and so faithful as hounds, I cannot help thinking, that, in the case to which we are referring, they must have been misled, at first, by some political deceiver.

— William Cobbett, February 14, 1807, Cobbett's Political Register, Volume XI

There is no fish species called "red herring." Rather, it is a name given to a particularly strong kipper, made from fish (typically herring) strongly cured in brine or heavily smoked. This process makes the fish particularly pungent-smelling and, with strong enough brine, turns its flesh reddish. In this literal sense, as a strongly cured kipper, the term can be dated to the late 13th century in the Anglo-Norman poem The Treatise by Walter of Bibbesworth, which then first appears in Middle English in the early 14th century: "He eteþ no ffyssh / But heryng red." A 15th-century text known as the Heege Manuscript includes a joke about fighting oxen chopping one another apart until only "three red herrings" remain.

The figurative sense of "red herring" has traditionally been said to originate from a supposed technique of training scent hounds. There are variations of the story, but according to one version, the pungent red herring would be dragged along a trail until a puppy learned to follow the scent. Later, when the dog was being trained to follow the faint odour of a fox or a badger, the trainer would drag a red herring perpendicular to the animal's trail to confuse the dog. The dog eventually learned to follow the original scent rather than the stronger scent. A variation of this story is given, without mention of its use in training, in The Macmillan Book of Proverbs, Maxims, and Famous Phrases (1976), with the earliest use cited being from W. F. Butler's Life of Napier, published in 1849. Brewer's Dictionary of Phrase and Fable (1981) gives the full phrase as "Drawing a red herring across the path", an idiom meaning "to divert attention from the main question by some side issue"; here, once again, a "dried, smoked and salted" herring when "drawn across a fox's path destroys the scent and sets the hounds at fault." Another variation of the dog story is given by Robert Hendrickson (1994) who says escaping convicts used the pungent fish to throw off hounds in pursuit.

According to a pair of articles by Professor Gerald Cohen and Robert Scott Ross published in Comments on Etymology (2008), supported by etymologist Michael Quinion and accepted by the Oxford English Dictionary, the idiom did not originate from a hunting practice. Ross researched the origin of the story and found the earliest reference to using herrings for training animals was in a tract on horsemanship published in 1697 by Gerland Langbaine. Langbaine recommended a method of training horses (not hounds) by dragging the carcass of a cat or fox so that the horse would be accustomed to following the chaos of a hunting party. He says if a dead animal is not available, a red herring would do as a substitute. This recommendation was misunderstood by Nicholas Cox, published in the notes of another book around the same time, who said it should be used to train hounds (not horses). Either way, the herring was not used to distract the hounds or horses from a trail, rather to guide them along it.

A slightly different metaphorical usage of "red herring" appears in a 1682 pamphlet printed by Richard Baldwin, defending the Earl of Shaftesbury: "But your Lordships business is, to keep your Hounds in full cry, against the pretended Association, for since you cannot find one really in being; a red-herring from your own Kitchen, must be hunted and trail'd through the Kingdom, to make a noise."

The earliest reference to using herring for distracting hounds is an article published on 14 February 1807 by the radical journalist William Cobbett in his polemical periodical Political Register. (Note: For the full original story by Cobbett, see the "Continental War" section in Cobbett, William (1807). Cobbett's political register. London: Richard Bagshaw. pp. 231–234.)

According to Cohen and Ross, and as accepted by the OED, this is the origin of the figurative meaning of red herring. In the piece, William Cobbett critiques the English press, which had mistakenly reported Napoleon's defeat. Cobbett recounted that he had once used a red herring to deflect hounds in pursuit of a hare, adding "It was a mere transitory effect of the political red-herring; for, on the Saturday, the scent became as cold as a stone." Quinion concludes: "This story, and [Cobbett's] extended repetition of it in 1833, was enough to get the figurative sense of red herring into the minds of his readers, unfortunately also with the false idea that it came from some real practice of huntsmen."

Although Cobbett popularized the figurative usage, he was not the first to consider red herring for scenting hounds in a literal sense; an earlier reference occurs in the pamphlet Nashe's Lenten Stuffe, published in 1599 by the Elizabethan writer Thomas Nashe, in which he says "Next, to draw on hounds to a scent, to a red herring skin there is nothing comparable." The Oxford English Dictionary makes no connection with Nashe's quote and the figurative meaning of red herring to distract from the intended target, only in the literal sense of a hunting practice to draw dogs toward a scent.

The use of herring to distract pursuing scent hounds was tested on Episode 148 of the series MythBusters. Although the hound used in the test stopped to eat the fish and lost the fugitive's scent temporarily, it eventually backtracked and located the target, resulting in the idea's being classified by the show as a "Busted" myth.

== See also ==
- Attention theft
- Chekhov's gun
- Chewbacca defense
- Dead cat strategy
- Decoy
- False flag
- False positive
- False scent
- Foreshadowing
- Garden path sentence
- Ignoratio elenchi
- List of fallacies § Red herring fallacies
- MacGuffin
- Non sequitur (fallacy)
- Plot twist
- Red herring prospectus
- Shaggy dog story
- Snipe hunt (a fool's errand or wild goose chase)
- The Five Red Herrings
- Twelve Red Herrings
