= James Archer (stock trader) =

English businessman (born 1974)

The Hon. James Howard Archer (born 10 June 1974) is an English businessman, and was previously a stock market trader. His parents are Jeffrey Archer, the late novelist and former Conservative politician, and Dame Mary Archer, a British scientist specialising in solar power conversion.

== Early life ==
Archer was educated at Eton College, where he became captain of the athletics team, and Brasenose College, Oxford, where he studied chemistry and in 1993 ran in the Oxford and Cambridge Varsity match.

== Career ==
At Credit Suisse First Boston, in London, Archer was a member of a cadre of five proprietary traders known as the "Flaming Ferraris" after the rum cocktail they adopted as their trademark drink. In December 1998, one of the other members of the group orchestrated a public relations picture arriving at Nobu, an expensive Japanese restaurant in Park Lane, in what The Independent characterised as "Reservoir Dogs-style".

In 2000, James Archer and his boss Adrian Ezra were found to have attempted to manipulate the closing price of a Swedish stock, Stora, through aggressive short-selling shortly after the Nobu stunt, and as a result the Financial Services Authority expelled them from the Securities and Futures Authority register. Archer was required to pay £50,000 towards the legal costs of the Securities and Futures Authority.

In 2010, the Nasdaq OMX in Stockholm formally reviewed the ban on Archer and stated that they would no longer object to his being given access to their markets, should the circumstances arise.

In 2019, he was registered by the FCA as a CF30.

Since 2001, Archer has served as a director of Marlborough Gate House (Freehold) Ltd., of which he was previously Company Secretary, resigning in 2009; a director of TFM Partners; a Limited Liability Partner in Target Living Homes LPP, together with his ex-wife Tara Bernerd.

== Personal life ==
In 2003 he met Tara Bernerd, who had just opened up the architectural and design agency Target Living, and they were married in Rome in 2005. However, by mid 2009 they were separated and later divorced.

In 2013, Archer married Gwyneth Harrison.
