= A Twist in the Tale (short story collection) =

Book by Jeffrey Archer

- First edition (UK)
- Author: Jeffrey Archer
- Language: English
- Genre: Mystery
- Published: 1988
- Publisher: Hodder & Stoughton (UK); Simon and Schuster (US)
- Pages: 240
- ISBN: 9780671671488
- OCLC: 18290269

A Twist in the Tale is a 1988 collection of short stories by British author and politician Jeffrey Archer. The collection contains 12 stories, which are listed below.

== Plot summaries ==
=== "The Perfect Murder" ===
Plot:

The writer kills his mistress inadvertently during an argument when he finds her being unfaithful to him, and is chosen as a jury member to try a man accused of murdering the same woman. He, as the foreman of the jury, pronounces a guilty verdict on the accused — thereby exonerating himself completely.

=== "Clean Sweep Ignatius" ===
Plot:

Ignatius Agarbi is the new Financial Minister of Nigeria. He begins a sweep on corruption and makes a name for himself. He is extremely honest, even insisting that his family vacations be billed to himself and not to his ministry. He is entrusted by his president to find out how many Nigerians have stashed their bribes in Switzerland.

He arrives at the Swiss Bank with a briefcase. Despite his greatest persuasion, the Swiss refuse to break their code of privacy. In the end, Ignatius places a gun to the head of the Swiss banker and threatens to kill him. Still the banker refuses to divulge any confidential information.

Ignatius, who is actually extremely corrupt, was only checking to find out if the Swiss Banks would actually reveal the name of an account holder. Delighted with their secrecy, Ignatius invests nearly $5 million in cash which he has skimmed during his period as Financial Minister.

=== "A la Carte" ===
Plot:

When Mark Hapgood has finished high school in Coventry, his father refuses to allow him to join Triumph car factory as a floor worker, the same job his father does himself. They strike a deal that Mark will take a different job for one whole year, after which time he will be free to accept any job – even the car factory, like most of his friends.

Mark is angry, but with his father's help finds a job in a London hotel as a porter. It is hard work but Mark has set his mind to endure it for this one year. What annoys him most is the head porter who keeps criticizing him and even takes all his tips from him. Ten weeks before the year is over, Mark expresses his annoyance towards the head porter and is fired. Mark begs the manager for another job and accepts the only one available, peeling potatoes in the kitchen. Soon he encounters Chef Jacques who is impressed with Mark's skills and promotes him to slicing. When Mark's year is up and he is about to leave, he realizes that he actually loves this job and joins Jacques to learn all about cooking.

Over the years, working with Jacques, Mark is to become an international chef with a huge reputation. Together they move to Paris where they eventually cook in their own restaurant. When Jacques has died, Mark moves back to London to open his first restaurant in England. This is where his parents finally attend and enjoy their famous son's cuisine. When the head waiter, impressed by the old man's style, later asks Mark after his father's profession he is astonished to hear that he was not a lawyer or teacher but a factory worker. Mark gratefully explains that his father was stuck in a boring job with Triumph because he did not have a father like Mark had.

=== "Not the Real Thing" ===
This story became the leading title to the best selling anthology paperback of 1995 with the same title.

Plot:

Gerald Haskins and Walter Ramsbottom are friends and rivals since their common school days in Hull. Gerald steals Walter's fiancée Angela Bradbury and marries her. They spend their honeymoon in the fictitious little kingdom of Multavia which is described as "sandwiched between Austria and Czechoslovakia".

Years later, Gerald has become a successful engineer and entrepreneur in sewerage construction. Having completed a renovation of Multavia's sewage system, he is awarded the Order of the Peacock, Third Class, which turns out to be a cheap piece of brass and glass. Walter, who is a jeweller and also a city councillor, pokes fun of it and claims to be receiving a 14K gold chain when becoming Mayor. Gerald sees a popular jeweller in London and commissions a copy of the original order, made of pure gold and real gems, although this will cost him £211,000.

A few days before Walter's imminent inauguration, the King of Multavia visits London and Gerald is invited to a reception. To his surprise, the King awards him the Order of the Peacock, Second Class, replacing his precious gold order with another cheap brass piece. While Gerald still plans to reclaim it, the Queen is awarded the Order of the Peacock, First Class and decorated with Gerald's "real thing". However, Angela tells her husband that Walter won't be mayor for another year, so Gerald knows he can have another gold copy made in time for Walter's mayor coronation ceremony.

=== "Just Good Friends" ===
This story was the subject of a plagiarism claim by author Kathleen Burnett in 1988

Plot:

In this first-person narrative, the female narrator awakens beside a man named Roger. While Roger is still asleep, she recalls how she had met him – in a pub where she used to work part-time, Roger was a daily patron. Although he is not very attractive and even somewhat boring, one day she hooked up with him and accompanied him to his house. Now the pair of them have been living together and developed their routines – how to use the bathroom in the morning, which joke to crack every day, how to spend the day in the office or at home, but also how to have breakfast together. "She" describes how Roger prepares everything for her and finally pushes her bowl towards her. Then she begins to swish her tail, and the reader realizes that "she" is a cat.

=== "The Steal" ===
Plot:

Margaret and Christopher Roberts are teachers who travel to Turkey in their summer holiday. As always, they have planned their stay meticulously and agreed that this year's keepsake – their "steal", as they call it – must be a carpet and they will spend £500 on it. Having arrived, however, they are surprised to find another English couple in their vicinity: Ray and Melody Kendall-Hume are parents of one of their pupils. Ray invites the Roberts to his yacht every day, boasting his wealth and wasting their precious time. Nonetheless, Christopher and Margaret manage to see most of the sights they had intended to visit.

On their final day, they sneak off into the bazaar but once more are distracted from their scheme by the Kendall-Humes. The wealthy couple take the thrifty teachers to a gigantic carpet shop named Osman's where they are looking for a carpet themselves. While Ray demands ever larger carpets to be shown, Margaret discovers a beautiful small one but is sure she cannot afford it. Ray drives a hard bargain and buys an enormous carpet for £20,000. When the Kendall-Humes have left, Mr Osman offers the Roberts to look at his assortment. It turns out that the small green carpet Margaret noticed is the perfect size for the Roberts' home, and after some bargaining that gratifies both sides, Margaret and Christopher purchase their "steal" at £500. Osman's son appears discontent but the dealer is delighted that the carpet's new owners will "obviously appreciate its true worth".

Back at Heathrow Airport, Ray asks the Roberts to take his carpet through customs, along with theirs. He hands Christopher £2,000 for any duty arising and assures him there will be no problem. Yet the customs officers take a long time and finally explain to the Roberts that there must be a mistake with the bills. Whereas the large carpet is an industrially made product with a worth of some £5,000, the Roberts' small carpet is a traditional, hand-made Hereke carpet and must be worth far more than the price they paid for it. As Ray's money covers all the duties, Margaret and Christopher have indeed made a "steal".

=== "Colonel Bullfrog" ===
Plot:

In 1943, Colonel Moore is the senior Allied officer in a Japanese prisoner-of-war camp in Malaya. Defying illness, starvation and maltreatment, he succeeds in keeping the spirit up by morning prayers and sports competitions. This earns him respect from his counterpart, Major Sakata, who compares Moore to the "British Bullfrog". While some of the Japanese staff treat their prisoners badly, the Major and a pair of NCOs behave as gentlemen. When the war is over, Colonel Moore is ordered to participate in the Allied war tribunal in Tokyo. Whereas the presiding American General advocates the death penalty for almost all Japanese military, the Colonel stands up to him and has many death sentences commuted to imprisonment, including his acquaintance Major Sakata. Having returned to England eventually, Richard Moore soon leaves the Army and becomes a parish priest, deeply content with his new task.

Some ten years later, Richard Moore's service in the small parish church is honoured by an unusual visitor. Mr Sakata has been set free and started working at an electronics company, as does one of his former NCOs, Corporal Sushi. They hold their former prisoner and saviour in the highest respect, Sakata assures Moore. The two of them keep corresponding through the years while their respective careers progress. In the 1970s, Ari Sakata rises to management and The Very Reverend Richard Moore becomes Dean of Lincoln Cathedral. When they touch on the topic of the cathedral roof which is in urgent need of repairs, the Dean need not wait long for a £10,000 cheque from Japan. They meet again in 1979, when Richard Moore becomes bishop of Taunton and Ari Sakata is managing director of the largest electronics company in Japan. A casual remark on the state of the church roof leads to another cheque which will cover the maintenance costs for a whole year. Regular donations help Bishop Moore but also embarrass him, so he avoids describing his needs and lamenting his dwindling health.

1988 is designated as an appeal year to raise three million pounds for repairs on the cathedral. But in August 1987, Bishop Moore dies suddenly. Among the numerous mourners in his memorial service, there are some elderly Japanese gentlemen including the chairman and president of the largest electronics company in the world. When they are met by the Archbishop of Canterbury, Chairman Sakata steps forward. However, he refuses all personal thanks for the donations to Richard Moore, referring to his president instead. This gentleman surprises the archbishop with another cheque for the full three million the cathedral needs. Asked for the reasons for his generosity, the president explains that he is trying to repay an act of honour and that Richard Moore might probably remember him as the inconspicuous corporal of forty years ago.

=== "A Chapter of Accidents" ===
The narrator of the story explains how he and his attractive wife, Caroline, went skiing in Verbier. The narrator is an inexperienced skier. However, during the course of their stay they befriend a man, Patrick Travers. Travers is quite charming and slowly grows closer to the pair, particularly Caroline. The narrator and Caroline return home, and he thinks nothing, until he meets a friend who bemoans that Travers, under the guise of renting a painting, had an affair with his wife (before returning the painting). The narrator is horrified at this revelation, as Travers has similarly commissioned a painting that belongs to him and Caroline, and assuming the worst, plots his revenge.

The two return to Verbier later, along with Travers, with the narrator having determined a course of action. He practices his skiing and rapidly improves. He then awakens early in the morning, careful no to awaken Caroline, and goes skiing, following Travers and challenging him to a race. Travers, though suspicious, reluctantly agrees, but shortly after he begins skiing, he is pushed by the narrator into a snowbank and is injured. The narrator casually returns to bed, explaining to a confused Caroline that he went skiing at the crack of dawn to practice.

He then triumphantly checks up on Traver in the hospital, only to learn that although Travers has been injured, the injuries are far from serious and he will recover soon. However, Caroline reveals that although Travers attempted to seduce her, she rejected his advances, horrifying the narrator. She further reveals that she was aware the whole time of his plot to kill Travers, and was disappointed that he failed, leaving the narrator shocked and thunderstruck.

=== "Check Mate" ===
Plot:

The story begins by introducing an alluring woman, whose entrance into the room is marked by every one of its occupants. The narrator goes on to describe the event as a chess tournament, where the lady is a new participant, and he himself was the Chess Club's new captain.

The tournament follows round-robin pairing, as the narrator finds himself facing a thin man, wearing a three-piece suit and half-moon spectacles, an accountant working in Woking. The beautiful stranger finds herself pitted against an elderly gentleman, who was once the club captain, but was now well past his prime. The narrator follows her every move, albeit inconspicuously. In the second round, she plays the accountant whom the narrator had defeated before the break. After a few rounds, they are acquainted over drinks, and the woman introduces herself as Amanda Curzon.

The narrator offers to drive her home, but soon invites her over to his place for a drink. One thing leads to another, as he pulls out an ornate chess set, and challenges her to a game, on the pretext that they were not able to play against each other at the tournament. He then proposes a wager – if she won, he would hand her ten pounds, but if he won, she would take off a piece of clothing, or an accessory.

As the game ensues, the narrator stalls for twenty minutes out of courtesy, and then brings it to a decisive checkmate. Amanda kicks off her shoes. Although she wishes to leave, he calls for a "double or quits"; twenty pounds to another garment. She accepts, and another half-hour later, her stockings are off.

The stakes are raised yet again, and within minutes, her black suspender belt joins her stockings and shoes. More fired up than ever, the narrator sets the board yet again. She puts up an impressive resistance this time, and it seems that she has got the better of him, until he plays a move similar to Karpov's Sicilian Defence, and wins yet again. She allows him to unzip the back of her dress, and lets it fall to the floor.

As the narrator returns from the kitchen with a new drink, he sees her there, dressed in nothing but a pair of panties and a gauzy black bra. In a final gamble, seething with excitement, he suggests they play for two hundred pounds, or both garments. The game lasts mere minutes; she annihilates him, and smiles enigmatically. Checkmate.

Before he can even process what has happened, all her clothes are back on. She smiles as he signs over two hundred pounds in her name, and leaves, shutting the front door behind her. Wondering how she would return home, the narrator races out, only to see her enter a BMW. She is joined by his first opponent, the accountant. Having succeeded in an elaborately planned conspiracy, the two smug faces drive off into the night.

=== "Honour Among Thieves" ===
In later editions, titled "The Wine Taster" so as not to be confused with Archer's novel of the same name.

Plot:

Sefton Hamilton is a rich but unpleasant man, as the narrator (no name is mentioned but he is a writer by profession, as Hamilton calls him "that author johnny") learns during a dinner at his friend's place. Pretentiously, Hamilton talks over the other guests and spreads his own opinions on any topic. When it comes to wine, he even disrespects the knowledgeable president of the Wine Society, Freddie Barker, another guest present. Finally the male guests of this dinner are invited to a lunch at Hamilton's, together with a wager that Barker will not be able to recognize any of four wines offered.

Though feeling uncomfortable, the three men find themselves at Sefton Hall and are received by the butler. The mansion is large and ostentatious, yet is said to hold "one of the finest wine cellars in England." Over the course of the meal, various wines are poured for the wager. Barker tastes them and makes his educated guess which will be compared to a card lying face-down by the decanters. But in spite of all his obvious expert knowledge, he fails each time in naming the correct producer and vintage of their beverage. The narrator, half-heartedly enjoying the taste of these exquisite wines, is able to observe the butler growing nervous and jittery, even staring at the guests in an imploring way. This behaviour seems equally strange as Barker's unaccountable mistakes. Eventually Freddie Barker has lost the wager, paid £200 and declared himself a humbug, much to Hamilton's glee.

The guests leave the mansion, agreeing to meet again for dinner at a nearby inn. Having arrived there, the friends recognize another patron as the butler, still somewhat nervous – as is the innkeeper's behaviour towards them. Barker leaves the choice of food and wine to the innkeeper, with a mysterious hint that he might know what his guests would expect. Surprisingly the wines are served not in bottles but in decanters and, even to the author's "untutored palate", appear superior to those offered at Sefton Hall. Barker is in a better mood than before and makes a cryptic remark that Sefton Hamilton's late father "knew his wines, while his son doesn't." He pays the £200 bill without a blink, commenting on the exquisite wines he had tasted today. The innkeeper declares that these wines should certainly not be wasted on a humbug. Barker's cheque, however, is passed to the butler who tears it up.

=== "The Loophole" ===
Plot:

Two friends fall out, and one ends up issuing a writ for libel. A large settlement is paid, but the only loser is someone else.

=== "Christina Rosenthal" ===
Plot:

This is a tragic love story. It is written largely from the perspective of the protagonist, Benjamin, a lawyer, who is the son of a rabbi. It is set in Canada and starts in Benjamin's high school years.

Benjamin, a Jew, falls in love with Christina, a German girl whose father is anti-Semitic, and had fought under the Nazis—for which he had been awarded the Iron Cross. As their forbidden romance grows, Christina becomes pregnant by Benjamin. But she is taken away immediately by her family, and forced to marry the son of an old family friend, Klaus Willing. However, it proves to be a sham marriage.

Five years later, Benjamin reestablishes contact with Christina where they both live and work in Toronto. She divorces her husband and in exchange for a swift divorce, he gets custody of the boy Nicholas—who cannot see his real father until he is 21 and should not be told he is Benjamin's son. A year into their newly rekindled passionate relationship and marriage, Christina is pregnant again, and gives birth to a girl named Deborah.

Unfortunately, she had not warned Benjamin that there were complications when she gave birth the first time, and had been advised by the doctors not to have any more children. She died during the childbirth. While on the way to the funeral, Benjamin—who is reconciled with Christina's parents and his own father—passes by the hospital to see Deborah. Unfortunately, the baby was too weak to survive and died not long after the birth. Unable to withstand the loss of both wife and child on the same day, Benjamin commits suicide.

The story ends with the revelation that what the reader understands to be Benjamin's contemporaneous rendering of the events is in fact a suicide note that his father, the old rabbi, has read each day for the last ten years since the suicide occurred.
