= Monica Coghlan =

English prostitute

Monica Coghlan (3 April 1951 – 27 April 2001) was an English woman. The centre of the scandal was British Conservative politician Jeffrey Archer in 1987. Although he won a libel case against the Daily Star newspaper, which had alleged that he had paid her for sex, it was later established, in legal proceedings in 2001, that he had perjured himself in the trial. Archer was jailed in July 2001, receiving a four-year sentence. Coghlan died in a car crash shortly before the second trial began, without having the chance to face him in court before his subsequent conviction.

== Early life ==
Monica Mary Coghlan was born on 3 April 1951, in Rochdale, the sixth of seven children. She had a troubled childhood, leaving home and school at the age of 15. While living alone, the diminutive (1.50 m, 4' 11", as an adult) teenager suffered a violent sexual attack and was forced to leave her flat. She first worked as a cloakroom attendant at a local cabaret, then became a sex worker at the age of 17. Her work alias was 'Debbie'. She was arrested several times for soliciting in the Greater Manchester area, and moved to London. Other juvenile arrests led to convictions for cannabis possession and shoplifting. She served two prison terms. All the time she concealed what she did from her family, telling them she worked in property.

She became pregnant, and for a short time retired from prostitution, returning to live in Rochdale to raise her son. When her boyfriend died unexpectedly, she returned to prostitution, leading a double life "to secure the boy's future"; she cared for the toddler during the week, then left him with friends or relatives at weekends, to commute by train to London to work.

== Jeffrey Archer ==
In September 1986, Coghlan picked up a client in Shepherd Market, Mayfair. Aziz Kurtha, an Indian businessman who saw the client with Coghlan, identified him as Jeffrey Archer, then the Conservative Party's Deputy Chairman. Kurtha sold the story of Archer seeing a prostitute to a tabloid newspaper. Rather than print the unverified story, the paper decided to organise a 'sting' by getting Coghlan to ask Archer for money to stay silent. On 24 October 1986, the News of the World filmed and audiotaped Michael Stackpole, a representative of Archer, giving Coghlan £2,000 in £50 notes on Platform 3 of London's Victoria Station to leave the country to avoid reporters. The reporters claimed Coghlan never asked for compensation. However, in court she said she earned £6,000 for taking part in the sting. Archer admitted to giving Coghlan travel funds but sued the bolder Daily Star for stating he and Coghlan had had sex for money.

During the trial, Coghlan broke down in tears repeatedly on cross-examination, but continued to assert the truth of the newspaper's story, dramatically calling Archer a liar in court. In other testimony she stated that she enjoyed her job as a prostitute and defended her work with married clients, saying that "Half the time it keeps marriages together." She regretted that she could not go back to work after the trial. "Jeffrey Archer took everything away from me," she would later say. "I lost my home, my dignity, my self-respect, and any hope of a future."

== After the trial ==
After the trial, Coghlan posed topless for a newspaper for £5,400, then worked as a bingo caller, earning enough money to buy a small house, where she continued raising her son out of the limelight. He had no knowledge of his mother's former profession and notoriety until he was 15 when the story resurfaced in the news.

In late 1999 and 2000, when Archer was running for Mayor of London, several of his confederates, who had testified for him at the trial, began recanting their stories. In September 2000, Archer was charged with perjury. His trial was due to commence the following May.

On 26 April 2001, drug addict Gary Day crashed a stolen Jaguar S-Type into Coghlan's Ford Fiesta outside Huddersfield, West Yorkshire. Day, aged 32, had robbed a pharmacy for drugs, then hijacked two cars using a fake pistol: a Peugeot taxi, which he crashed into a parked Land Rover, and then the Jaguar, from a motorist who had stopped at the first crash scene to help. Coghlan's car was catapulted through a wall. She lay in the wreck for an hour, and had to be cut out through the car's roof. She died from her injuries the next day in a hospital in Leeds, aged 50. Day admitted manslaughter, and was sentenced to life imprisonment on 6 July 2001.

Following her death and Archer's conviction for perjury, on 20 July 2001 the English Collective of Prostitutes wrote an open letter to The Guardian newspaper supporting her vindication, and calling her unjustly "branded by her sex, race and class and by the prostitution laws which label and condemn women."
