= Primus inter pares =

Latin phrase meaning "first among equals"

Primus inter pares is a Latin phrase meaning first among equals. (Note: Grammatically, the expression refers to a single male figure. A female would be prima inter pares and the plurals of both forms would be primi inter pares and primæ inter pares in the nominative case and primos inter pares and primas inter pares in the accusative. All these forms are exceedingly rare in English usage, however.) It is typically used as an honorary title for someone who is formally equal to other members of their group but is accorded unofficial respect, traditionally owing to their seniority in office.

Various modern figures such as the prime minister in parliamentary systems, the president of the Swiss Confederation, the chief justice of the United States, the chief justice of the Philippines, the archbishop of Canterbury of the Anglican Communion, the chair of the Federal Reserve in the United States and the ecumenical patriarch of Constantinople of the Eastern Orthodox Church fall under both senses: bearing higher status and various additional powers while remaining still merely equal to their peers in important senses.

Historically, the princeps senatus of the Roman Senate was such a figure and initially bore only the distinction that he was allowed to speak first during debate. After the fall of the Republic, Roman emperors originally referred to themselves only as princeps despite having enormous power.

== National use ==
=== China ===
In the People's Republic of China, which was placed under the collective leadership of the Politburo Standing Committee the term "first among equals" was often used to describe China's paramount leader.

=== Commonwealth usage ===
==== United Kingdom ====
The term "prime minister" can be compared to "primary minister" or "first minister". Because of this, the prime ministers of many countries are traditionally considered to be "first among equals" – they are the chairman or "head" of a cabinet rather than holding an office that is de jure superior to that of ministers.

The prime minister of the United Kingdom has frequently been described as "first among equals". In the UK, the executive is the Cabinet, and during Hanoverian times a minister had the role of informing the monarch about proposed legislation in the House of Commons and other matters. In modern times, however, although the phrase is still occasionally used, it understates the powers of the prime minister, which now include many broad, exclusive, executive powers over which cabinet members have little influence.

First Among Equals is the title of a popular political novel (1984) by Jeffrey Archer, about the careers and private lives of several men vying to become British prime minister. It was later adapted into a ten-part TV series, produced by Granada Television.

==== Federal government in Commonwealth realms ====
In the federal Commonwealth realms in which King Charles III is head of state as constitutional monarch, a governor-general is appointed by the King-in-Council to represent the King during his absence. The governor-general typically appoints the leader of the political party holding at least a plurality of seats in the elected legislature to be prime minister, whose relationship with the other ministers of the Crown is in theory said to be that of a primus inter pares, or "first among equals".

==== Australian states ====
In Australia, the governor-general of Australia, is "first among equals" of the governors.

==== Canadian provinces ====
As federations in Canada, lieutenant-governors represent the Canadian monarch in each of the provinces, thus, acting as the "heads of state" in the provinces. Lieutenant-governors in Canada are appointed by the governor general, on the advice of the prime minister of Canada, known as the Governor-in-Council. In each case, these lieutenant-governors are not envisaged as subordinate to the governor general who, as a federal viceroy, is "first among equals". A lieutenant governor as Lieutenant-Governor-in-Council appoints a leader of a provincial political party holding at least a plurality of seats in the elected provincial legislature to be provincial premier.

=== Japan ===
Starting with the Meiji Constitution of 1885, as part of the "Cabinet System Act", and lasting until the revision of the modern constitution in 1947, the prime minister of Japan was legally considered to be of the same rank as the other ministers who formed the Cabinet. During this time, the prime minister was referred to as "同輩中の首席" dōhai-chū no shuseki ("chief among peers").

=== Netherlands ===
The prime minister of the Netherlands (officially, the "minister-president") is the chairman of the Council of Ministers and active executive authority of the Dutch government and is the first among equals of the Council of Ministers.

=== Singapore ===
The phrase "first among equals" is often used to describe the political succession within the ruling People's Action Party leadership and future candidate for the prime minister of Singapore.

=== Switzerland ===
In Switzerland, the seven-member Federal Council constitutes the executive within the Swiss directorial system. Each year, the Federal Assembly elects a President of the Confederation. By convention, the offices of President and Vice President rotate annually, with each Councillor becoming Vice President and then President every seven years while in office.

The President is not the Swiss head of state, but is the highest-ranking Swiss official. The President presides over Council meetings and carries out certain representative functions that, in other countries, are performed by the head of state. In urgent situations where a Council decision cannot be made in time, the President is empowered to act on behalf of the whole Council. Apart from that, however, the President is a primus inter pares, having no power above and beyond that of the other six councillors.

=== United States ===
The phrase "first among equals" has also been used to describe the Chief Justice of the United States.

The Chief Justice has no authority over the decisions of the other Justices, but holds some administrative powers, such as appointing the Chair of the Judicial Conference Committee on the Budget. Seated at the center of the bench, the Chief Justice also presides the oral arguments when the counsels and the Associate Justices are having a colloquy. When the Chief Justice votes with the majority on a decision, they can either author the majority opinion or assign it to another Justice voting with the majority.

== Religion ==
=== Catholic Church ===
In Latin and Eastern Catholic Churches, the pope (bishop of Rome) is seen as the Vicar of Christ and "first among equals", the successor of Saint Peter, and leader of the Christian world, in accordance with the rules of apostolic succession to the apostles. In the Catholic Church, the pope holds the office with supreme authority in canon law over all other bishops.

In the Catholic Church, the dean of the College of Cardinals is the first among equal princes of the Church in the college, which is the pope's highest-ranking council and elects the papal successor, generally from its own ranks.

Various episcopal sees were granted or claim the title of primate (usually of a past or present political entity), which grants such a primas (usually a metropolitan archbishopric, often in a former/present capital) precedence over all other sees in its circumscription, outranking (other) metropolitan sees, but the incumbent primates can be trumped by personal ranks, as they rank below cardinals. More commonly, dioceses are geographically grouped in an ecclesiastical province, where only one holds the rank of metropolitan archbishop, which outranks his colleagues, who are therefore called his suffragans, even if these include (fairly rarely) another archbishop.

=== Eastern Orthodox Church ===
The phrase "first among equals" is also used to describe the role of the patriarch of Constantinople, who, as the "ecumenical patriarch", is the first among all the bishops of the Eastern Orthodox Church. He has no direct jurisdiction over the other patriarchs or the other autocephalous Orthodox churches and cannot interfere in the election of bishops in autocephalous churches, but he alone enjoys the right of convening extraordinary synods consisting of them or their delegates to deal with ad hoc situations, and he has also convened well-attended pan-Orthodox Synods in the last forty years. His title is an acknowledgement of his historic significance and of his privilege to serve as primary spokesman for the Eastern Orthodox Communion.

Eastern Christians considered the bishop of Rome to be the "first among equals" during the first thousand years of Christianity according to the ancient, first millennial order (or "taxis" in Greek) of Rome, Constantinople, Alexandria, Antioch, and Jerusalem, known as the Pentarchy that was established after Constantinople became the eastern capital of the Byzantine Empire.

The canons relative to the universal primacy of honor of the patriarch of Constantinople are the 9th canon of the synod of Antioch and the 28th canon of the Council of Chalcedon.

=== Lutheran churches ===
In the Lutheran Church of Sweden, the Archbishop of Uppsala is considered by the church as primus inter pares. As such, the Archbishop of Uppsala has no powers over the other 13 bishops but has some additional administrative and spiritual duties, as specified in the Church Order of the Church of Sweden. According to the chapter 8 of the Church Order, only the Archbishop of Uppsala can ordain a bishop. The other bishops of the Church of Sweden are peers, not subordinate, to the Archbishop of Uppsala. Among the Archbishop of Uppsala's other duties is the obligation to convene and chair the Episcopal Assembly. Unlike the other bishops, who are elected to office by members of their diocese, the Archbishop of Uppsala is elected by the entire body of the church. There is a peculiar regulation that stipulates that the total votes cast in the archdiocese of Uppsala, when electing an archbishop, "shall be divided by ten, with decimals removed", before being added to the national vote.

In the Evangelical Lutheran Church of Finland, the Archbishop of Turku and Finland serves as the primus inter pares.

The bishop of the Slovak Evangelical Church of the Augsburg Confession in Serbia is the primus inter pares of that denomination.

=== Anglican Communion ===
According to the Anglican Covenant, the archbishop of Canterbury is "first among equals" in their presidency over the Anglican Communion. The senior bishop of the seven diocesan bishops of the Scottish Episcopal Church bears the truncated title primus from primus inter pares. Leading bishops or primates in other Anglican 'national' churches are often said to be primus inter pares within their provinces (e.g. Church of Ireland), while the (first) primatial see of Canterbury remains primus among them.

However, on 20 February 2023, the Global South Fellowship of Anglican Churches declared the Archbishop of Canterbury had lost its mantle of first among equals due to him accepting the Church of England's incorporation into the Anglican liturgy of blessings of same-sex unions.

The International Anglican-Catholic Commission for Unity and Mission, in its 2007 agreed statement Growing Together in Unity and Mission, "urge[s] Anglicans and Catholics to explore together how the ministry of the Bishop of Rome might be offered and received in order to assist our Communions to grow towards full, ecclesial communion".

=== Reformed and Presbyterianism ===
The Moderator of the General Assembly in a Presbyterian church is similarly designated as a primus inter pares. This concept holds also for the Moderators of each Synod, Presbytery, and Kirk Session. As all elders are ordained – some for teaching and some for ruling – none sit in higher status, but all are considered equal behind the one and only head of the church Jesus Christ.

== See also ==
- Animal Farm - origin of the expression some "are more equal than others."
- Egalitarianism
- Republicanism
