= Be Careful What You Wish For (Archer novel) =

Book by Jeffrey Archer

- First edition (UK)
- Author: Jeffrey Archer
- Language: English
- Series: Clifton Chronicles (Book 4)
- Published: 13 March 2014
- Publisher: Macmillan (UK); St. Martin's Press (US)
- Publication place: United Kingdom
- Media type: Print (Hardcover, Paperback), Audio, eBook
- Pages: 400 (Paperback), 387 (Hardcover)
- ISBN: 978-0-230-74825-5
- OCLC: 857879257
- Preceded by: Best Kept Secret
- Followed by: Mightier Than the Sword

Be Careful What You Wish For is the fourth novel in Jeffrey Archer's Clifton Chronicles. It was published on 13 March 2014.

== Plot ==
Be Careful What You Wish For follows the Barrington-Clifton family during the years 1957 to 1964, when Emma Barrington Clifton seeks to take control of her family's shipping business and must deal with conspiracies and sabotage. Don Pedro Martinez tries to get his own candidate to lead the company, and Yorkshire banker Cedric Hardcastle joins the board.

== Sequel ==
There will be seven books in the Clifton Chronicles instead of the initial five as was earlier intended. This is due to the fact that Archer felt that he could not end the series without suddenly killing Harry Clifton, the protagonist of the series so he decided to extend the series. The next book, Mightier Than the Sword was published on 24 February 2015 and Archer stated that Margaret Thatcher would make an appearance.
