= Cometh the Hour =

2016 novel by Jeffrey Archer

- Author: Jeffrey Archer
- Language: English
- Series: Clifton Chronicles (Book 6)
- Published: February 16, 2016
- Publisher: St. Martin's Press
- Publication place: United Kingdom
- Media type: Print (hardcover, paperback), audio, eBook
- Pages: 416
- ISBN: 978-1250061621
- Preceded by: Mightier Than the Sword (2015)
- Followed by: This Was a Man (2016)

Cometh the Hour is the sixth novel in Jeffrey Archer's Clifton Chronicles. This series follows the events of the fictitious Clifton and Barrington families, starting in the 1920s.

== Plot ==
Cometh the Hour opens with the reading of the suicide note of Alex Fisher, MP. This note has potentially devastating consequences for Harry and Emma Clifton, Sir Giles Barrington and Lady Virginia Fenwick.

Sir Giles must decide whether to divulge the contents of the note to the press. If he does so it could ruin his political career. He also is considering to end this career to try to rescue a lady he met and loves (Karin) who is in East Germany and barred by that government from emigrating to England. He also must consider whether Karin loves him or whether she is a spy for the Russians.

Lady Virginia, the ex-wife of Sir Giles, is facing bankruptcy because she does not know how to wisely manage her money. She seems certain to lose about everything until she is introduced to a wealthy, but gullible, man from Louisiana, Cyrus T. Grant III. Lady Virginia cooks up a scheme to force Grant to pay her a generous monthly sum for years to come.

Sebastian Clifton is now the Chief Executive of Farthings Bank and because he lost his fiancée years before is now a workaholic. He falls for Priya, a beautiful Indian girl. But her parents have already chosen her future husband and she has no say in the matter. Sebastian also makes contact with his fiancé and their daughter to see whether the old relationship can be patched up. Sebastian's ruthless enemies Adrian Sloane and Desmond Mellor are still plotting to take over Farthings and will stop at nothing, legal or otherwise, to achieve their goal.

Harry Clifton, now in his mid-50s, has been working to get Anatoly Babakov, who wrote an unauthorized account of Joseph Stalin, released from a gulag in Siberia and allowed to travel to New York, where his wife had lived for many years following his imprisonment.

== Critical reception ==
Kirkus Reviews published a favorable review of this book, saying, "Another artful Archer telenovela, readable as a stand-alone family drama but more a treat for those captured by the series." Harry S. Chou, on the Large Print Reviews website, which reviews large-print editions of books, likes the whole Clifton Chronicle series, saying, "I think that The Clifton Chronicles series by is unique among long running fiction series, because it is only getting better with each new volume!" Publishers Weekly said, "Archer continues his storytelling magic to create characters of spellbinding substance, and readers can count on his surprising twists and shocking conclusion."

Ritika Jain, of the DNA India website, offered a mixed review of this book, saying, "Book six of the Clifton Chronicles is a page turner and often unputdownable, but, perhaps, it's time for Jeffrey Archer to give the story the closure it deserves."
