= To Cut a Long Story Short (short story collection) =

Short story collection by Jeffrey Archer

First edition (publ. HarperCollins)

To Cut a Long Story Short (ISBN 0-00-226149-9) is a 2000 short story collection by British writer and politician Jeffrey Archer. Unlike his previous collections, which have contained 12 stories, this one has 15. A list of the featured stories is below.

- Death Speaks (from W. Somerset Maugham's Sheppey)
- The Expert Witness
- The Endgame
- The Letter
- Crime Pays
- Chalk and Cheese
- A Change of Heart
- Too Many Coincidences
- Love At First Sight
- Both Sides Against The Middle
- A Weekend to Remember
- Something for Nothing
- Other Blighters' Efforts
- The Reclining Woman
- The Grass is Always Greener . . .
