= Twelve Red Herrings =

Book by Jeffrey Archer

- First edition (UK)
- Author: Jeffrey Archer
- Language: English
- Publisher: HarperCollins
- Publication date: July 1994
- Publication place: United Kingdom
- Pages: 324
- ISBN: 0-00-224329-6

Twelve Red Herrings (or 12 Red Herrings) is a 1994 short story collection by British writer and politician Jeffrey Archer. Archer challenges his readers to find "twelve red herrings", one in each story. The book reached #3 in the Canadian best-sellers (fiction) list. J. K. Sweeney from Magill Book Reviews (01/01/1995) reviews the stories as "An attempt, it must be said, which is of such a nature that quite often the author succeeds in the effort."

For the story "One Man's Meat..." the reader is offered the choice of four different endings: "Rare", "Burnt", "Overdone" and "À Point". Sweeney from Magill Book Reviews comments on this: "Each of the conclusions is quite plausible, although the average reader may find one far more convincing that the others--a circumstance which the author no doubt anticipated with a certain degree of relish."

== Contents ==
The book contains 12 stories.

- "Trial and Error"
- "Cheap at Half The Price"*
- "Dougie Mortimer's Right Arm"*
- "Do Not Pass Go"*
- "Chunnel Vision"*
- "Shoeshine Boy"*
- "You'll Never Live to Regret It"*
- "Never Stop on the Motorway"*
- "Not for Sale"
- "Timeo Danaos"*
- "An Eye for an Eye"*
- "One Man's Meat..."

In the preface the author notes that the stories indicated with an asterisk are "based on known incidents (some of them embellished with considerable licence)."

== See also ==
- Timeo Danaos et dona ferentes
