= Cat O'Nine Tales =

Short story collection by Jeffrey Archer

- First edition
- Author: Jeffrey Archer
- Illustrator: Ronald Searle
- Language: English
- Genre: Short stories
- Published: 2006
- Publication place: United Kingdom
- Pages: 200
- ISBN: 978-1-4050-3257-5
- OCLC: 1108024129

Cat O'Nine Tales is British author Jeffrey Archer's fifth collection of short stories. It was published in 2006, and nine of the twelve stories are based on tales Archer heard while in prison. The other three stories are also based on true events but are not derived from prison.

== Contents ==
1. "The Man Who Robbed His Own Post Office"
2. "Maestro"
3. "Don't Drink the Water"
4. "It Can't Be October Already"
5. "The Red King"
6. "The Wisdom of Solomon"
7. "Know What I Mean?"
8. "Charity Begin at Home"
9. "The Alibi"
10. "A Greek Tragedy"
11. "The Commissioner"
12. "In the Eye of the Beholder"
