= Honour Among Thieves (novel) =

Novel by Jeffrey Archer

- First edition
- Author: Jeffrey Archer
- Language: English
- Publisher: HarperCollins
- Publication date: 4 July 1993
- Media type: Print (hardback & paperback)
- Pages: 416
- ISBN: 0-06-017945-7
- OCLC: 27976980
- Dewey Decimal: 823/.914 20
- LC Class: PR6051.R285 H66 1993

Honour Among Thieves (1993) is a novel by English author Jeffrey Archer. The book takes place in 1993 with Saddam Hussein planning to retaliate against the United States after the events of the Gulf War.

When the United States defeats Iraq in the 1991 Gulf War, Saddam Hussein plans to humiliate the victors by stealing the American Declaration of Independence and publicly burning it on 4 July in full view of world media. To achieve this, his Deputy Ambassador to the United Nations enlists the help of Antonio Cavalli, a lawyer and one of the leading figures of the New York mafia, for a sum of $100,000,000.

An Israeli, Hannah Kopec, a young ex-model Mossad agent with a personal vendetta against Saddam Hussein, is involved in a plot to assassinate him. In the United States, the government finds that the Declaration of Independence has been swapped with a forgery. Scott Bradley, a Yale Law professor, who has been working undercover tracking Kopec through Paris, is assigned by the CIA to work with her to recover the document before 4 July.
