= A Quiver Full of Arrows =

1980 book by Jeffrey Archer

- First edition cover
- Author: Jeffrey Archer
- Language: English
- Published: Linden Press/Simon & Schuster, 1980
- Pages: 189
- ISBN: 0-340-25752-0
- OCLC: 8589698

A Quiver Full of Arrows is a 1980 collection of twelve short stories by British writer and politician Jeffrey Archer.

From London to China, and New York to Nigeria, Jeffrey Archer takes the reader on a tour of ancient heirlooms and modern romance, of cutthroat business and kindly strangers, of lives lived in the realms of power and lives freed from the gloom of oppression. Fortunes are made and squandered, honor betrayed and redeemed, and love lost and rediscovered. (Worldcat.org)

== Stories ==
=== The Chinese Statue ===
The story begins in Sotheby’s auction house, where a Chinese statue, belonging to an aristocrat, is put under the hammer. Upon delving deeper, the narrator of the story discovers that the statue was acquired by Sir Alexander Heathcote in the village of Ha Li Chaun, during one of the trips he took into the Chinese country to explore his love for Chinese art, in particular art which belonged to the Ming dynasty. The statue was acquired from an old craftsman. In reality, the statue had just been shown to Sir Alexander when the craftsman discovered his interest in Ming dynasty. However, since Chinese traditions dictated that the host must part with anything a guest desires, the craftsman had to give up the statue. Since Sir Alexander himself was an honourable man, he repaid the craftsman in full, building for him a nice house in the hills where he could retire.

Sir Alexander, in his will, wrote that the statue must be passed on to the first-born of each heir, and should only be sold when the family name was in peril. After Sir Alexander Heathcote, the statue travelled into the custody of his son, Major James Heathcote, who displayed it amongst his trophies at his regiment Halifax. From Major James Heathcote’s table, the statue was then placed in the bishop’s house, where the next heir Right Revered resided. Then the statue once again found its way back to Halifax, for the next heir, Captain James, who also worked for the army. Captain James, however, lost his life untimely, and the statue was then passed on to his two-year old son, Alex. Alex, spoiled by his mother from a young age, did not have the same regard for the statue as his ancestors did. When he gambled away all his money at roulette and got a threatening call from his creditors, he decided to auction away the statue to pay his debts.

When Alex carried the statue to Sotheby, he was informed later that the statue was a counterfeit and was only worth a fraction of what he owed his creditors. However, luck was on Alex’s side, because the base of the statue – something that the old craftsman had put in place since the original statue was without a base – was an artefact which was worth a fortune. The narrator of the story then became the next owner of the statue, buying it for seven hundred and twenty guineas. The base was auctioned off to another American gentleman for twenty-two thousand guineas.

=== The Coup ===
Eduardo De Silveria and Manuel Rodrigues, rival construction magnates from Brazil, arrive in Nigeria. Eduardo is hoping to receive the contract for building the city of Abuja while Manuel is there for a port contract. A coup owing to Colonel Dimka who assassinates the president General Muhammad causes all the flights out of Nigeria to be cancelled and both Eduardo and Manuel are forced to spend time together without anyway to travel. During this time, they discover a friendship and at the end they become good friends and even business partners.

=== The First Miracle ===
Pontius Pilate, son of the governor of the Judea Province, is sent by his mother to buy three pomegranates and a chicken. In the town of Bethlehem, he meets Joseph and Mary, just before the birth of Jesus Christ. He is mesmerized by the presence of Mary and offers all his food items to her. On the way back, he sees the three wise men (the Magi) and give them the pomegranates. When he arrives home very late, his authoritarian father demands the truth from Pontius and refuses to believe his story. His father whips him and sends him to bed.

His mother is also reluctant to believe his story, but when she comes to apply balm on his wounds she discovers that all his wounds have miraculously healed. She exits the room believing him.

=== The Perfect Gentleman ===
Edward Shrimpton is met by the author at a local club. Shrimpton was an ace player of backgammon for the club, considered to be the best. He was defeated by Harry Newman however, on the eve of a major club championship which was puzzling because Newman was a good player, but not in Shrimpton's league. Harry Newman had suffered a lot. His wife left him for a partner, his partner had stolen his share of money and he was nearly destitute. Yet after this win, Harry had gone from success to success with amazing ease.

When the author met Shrimpton, he found out that he had intentionally made Newman win, to give him some hope, and did not care about any recognition in the matter. He also claimed that Newman won because of his own talents, making Shrimpton a "perfect gentleman".

=== One Night Stand ===
Michael and Adrian run into Debbie in New York. They are both Londoners who had travelled in New York, and decide between themselves to have a one-night stand with Debbie. They also share a code that whoever returns to New York gets to have a one-night stand with Debbie.

Michael returns to New York, calls Debbie, and the couple have a one-night stand. As Michael turns to leave, Debbie informs him to his horror that Debbie herself had decided to have a one-night stand. She decided to ignore New Yorkers who would think she was easy, and made a choice that whichever one of Michael or Adrian came to New York, she would have a one-night stand with him.

=== The Century ===
An unnamed Oxonian has an ambition to succeed as a cricketer for Oxford and follow his famous cricketer father's footsteps. He wishes to make a name for himself in the Oxford vs Cambridge cricket match.

In his first year, he makes the team and has a terrific season, but somehow injures his finger before the final match. In his second year, he is in poor form and asks his captain to drop him from the finals. In his third year, he is the captain.

He struggles with the ball and with the bat getting out cheaply for a duck in the first innings. In his second innings, he struggles and nearly gets out, but after hooking a boundary, starts scoring runs briskly. With his score on 99, he is stranded in the middle of the crease and the ball is with the opposition captain Robin Oakley, who, instead of running the captain out and thereby putting Cambridge in a winning position, chooses to allow the captain to go back to the crease. The captain hits a boundary, scores his hundred and deliberately gets out hit wicket to honour the opposition.

The match ends in a draw as rain pours down, thereby being the ideal situation expected for one and all.

The story is reportedly based on the famous Indian cricketer Mansoor Ali Khan "Tiger" Pataudi (also known as the Nawab of Pataudi). Pataudi was a student at Oxford, and was involved in a serious car accident in which he lost the use of his right eye.

=== Broken Routine ===
Septimus Horatio Cornwallis is a normal man who has a pretty common routine. He is a claims adjuster with an insurance company. His extremely tight routine is badly affected one day when he is asked to stay late. He returns home in a packed train, when he discovers that a young hoodlum has misappropriated his cigarettes and his newspaper. He decides to confront the young man, and smokes his cigarettes one after the other. The young man does the same and it becomes a contest. Septimus, finally feeling that he has taught the young man a lesson, opens his briefcase to find his cigarettes and paper intact, implying he has actually been smoking the young man's cigarettes and abusing his paper.

=== Henry's Hiccup ===
Henry is the son of the Grand Pasha of Egypt. He is a millionaire living in London, but is used to everything being done by his manservant Barker. He has done nothing in his life, and so has no knowledge of travel or of making arrangements.

During the war, he stays in America. When he returns, he marries Victoria. During their honeymoon, without Barker, Henry runs into one difficulty after another, travelling third class by train and ship to France and staying in a small room in the George V without making arrangements.

In the end, a flower girl who knew him sarcastically gives him flowers for his wife when she realises that he has no money and forgot to bring any.

=== A Matter of Principle ===
Sir Hamish Graham was brought up in the 1950s. He is an uncompromising Scot who is honest and talented and hardworking, but also narrow-minded and pompous. In the 1970s, his construction company is not doing very well, when he is given a Mexican contract.

He refuses to believe an agent, Victor Perez, is required to be appointed, to whom ten percent of the contract price must be paid and that this percentage is actually the minister's cut. He visits the minister and insists on knowing the full details and simply refuses to believe any version of the minister, who tells him that Victor's father once, at great personal risk, saved an injured soldier, which was why the government gives him the privileges of receiving money from tenders. Later, when Graham does not understand, the Minister realises that Sir Hamish is not a man who can do business the Mexican way and sends him out. In the end, the minister is shown to be limping, revealing that he was the injured soldier.

=== Old Love ===
The story follows two students, William Hatchard and Phillippa Jameson, of English literature from Oxford in the 1930s. They fell in enmity with each other at first sight. The mutual hatred began a sense of competition which enabled them to outshine their contemporaries, but to remain close with each other. Their rivalry is to be decided by the Charles Oldham Prize. Phillipa's father dies, William drives her to the funeral, and the two fall in love.

Their love is decided by the Charles Oldham which both of them share. They get married and their love is expressed by sarcastic remarks. They become successes in their own fields, becoming professors and teaching chairs of Oxford in English Literature, and receiving knighthoods.

One day, William and Phillipa have an argument on a crossword puzzle on the existence of the word 'Whymwham'. Phillipa dies of a heart attack after William leaves for College. When William finds this out, he shoots himself, leaving a note saying, 'Forgive me, but I had to let her know'. He could not bear to live without her and rumour had it that they were never apart for more than a few hours.

On 10 May 1987, Love Song, a two-part Masterpiece Theater presentation, was produced based on the story, with Michael Kitchen as William and Diana Hardcastle as Phillippa. The play was produced by Richard Bennett.

=== The Hungarian Professor ===
After the revolution, the writer meets a professor in Hungary that knows more about England than the writer himself, who hails from London. The professor's interest in London touches the writer. He realises that the professor died without achieving his dream to visit England.

=== The Luncheon ===
A writer meets Susan at a literary party. He remembers a luncheon date with her when he was struggling to make ends meet. Susan was a chatty type who invited him to lunch, which cost him his entire savings account fortune. He attended the lunch as he believed Susan's husband was a popular producer, but she kept this fact from him until the end. She confessed that she had divorced him and was married to the owner of the very restaurant where the writer had spent all of his money.

"The Luncheon" was later made into an episode of the TV series Tales of the Unexpected.
