= First Among Equals (novel) =

Novel by Jeffrey Archer

- First edition (UK)
- Author: Jeffrey Archer
- Language: English
- Genre: Political novel
- Publisher: Hodder & Stoughton (UK); Simon & Schuster (US)
- Publication date: 1984
- Publication place: United Kingdom
- Media type: Print
- Pages: 446 pp
- ISBN: 0-340-35266-3
- OCLC: 10607270
- Dewey Decimal: 823/.914 19
- LC Class: PR6051.R285 F5 1984

First Among Equals is a 1984 novel by British author Jeffrey Archer, which follows the careers and personal lives of four fictional British politicians (Simon Kerslake, MP for Coventry Central and later Pucklebridge; Charles Seymour, MP for Sussex Downs; Raymond Gould, MP for Leeds North; and Andrew Fraser, MP for Edinburgh Carlton) from 1964 to 1991, with each vying to become Prime Minister. Several situations in the novel are drawn from Archer's own early political career in the British House of Commons, and the fictional characters interact with actual political figures from the UK and elsewhere including Winston Churchill, Alec Douglas-Home, Harold Wilson, Edward Heath, Margaret Thatcher, Douglas Hurd, Muammar al-Gaddafi, Gary Hart and Queen Elizabeth II.

The title is a literal translation of the Latin term Primus inter pares, a term used to refer to either the most senior member of a group of equals (peers) or to refer to someone who claims to be just one member of a group of equals when in reality he or she completely dominates said group. This phrase is used to describe the official constitutional status of the British Prime Minister within the Cabinet.

== US and UK plot differences ==
When published in the United States, the novel was rewritten to eliminate the character of Andrew Fraser. The Fraser character eventually departs the Labour Party to join the breakaway Social Democratic Party. According to Archer, the change was made because the publisher did not believe an American audience could understand a multi-party political system. As a result, several plot elements revolving around Fraser were transferred to other characters, notably Simon Kerslake, who suffered through a change of heart toward a prospective marriage partner and the later loss of a child.

The ending of the novel differed in the US version, with both the winner of the ultimate election and the manner in which the contest was decided changing from one version to the next. In an interview, Archer joked that he found his American friends were generally more supportive of Kerslake, while his British readers backed Gould.

The original UK version was later released in the United States as well.

== Television serial ==
First Among Equals was adapted into a Granada Television serial transmitted by ITV in 1986.

== Characters ==
=== Raymond Gould ===
==== Personal life ====
The son of Stephen Gould, a butcher, Raymond from a young age had wanted to pursue a political career rather than enter the family business.

Gould is in something of a marriage of convenience with his wife Joyce, owing to her efforts to maintain support for him in his Leeds constituency. Gould had originally wished to break off their months-long relationship before being told by Joyce that she was pregnant and being forced to marry her. After Joyce suffered a miscarriage whilst travelling on their honeymoon, Gould did not endeavour to start a family with her. Due to the fact that Raymond and Joyce spent much of their time apart in London and Leeds respectively, Gould engaged in a number of extramarital affairs, and had solicited a prostitute early in his ministerial career (which resulted in attempted blackmail against him).

=== Andrew Fraser ===
==== Political career ====
Fraser was first elected as a Member of Parliament in 1964, continuously representing the constituency of Edinburgh Carlton during the events of the novel. Initially serving as a member of the Labour Party, he was deselected by his local party's executive, owing to its growing far-left composition, and replaced by its chairman, Frank Boyle.

Due to his deselection, Fraser defected to the Social Democratic Party, first contesting his seat as its candidate in 1983. This election was newsworthy due to both Fraser and Boyle being tied, which was resolved via a coin toss which Fraser won. As a new SDP MP, Fraser then became its parliamentary Spokesman for Defence.

Following the resignation of David Owen as Leader of the SDP, Fraser succeeded him uncontested. Following the election of a hung parliament in 1991, Fraser agreed to support a Labour-led government headed by Raymond Gould on condition that two Cabinet positions be granted to SDP MPs, and that a referendum be held on proportional representation.

==== Personal life ====
Due to his decision to pursue a political career as a member of the Labour Party, Fraser had something of a friendly rivalry with his father, the chairman of the local Conservative party. Despite their political differences, Fraser's father helped to support him, mentioning that he voted for his own son at each election and even appointing a non-entity candidate for the Conservatives to help his son's re-election prospects when he first contested his seat for the SDP (although this may also have been to prevent the election of Boyle, an ardent Communist).

Fraser and his wife, Louise, had a fraught time starting a family. After a miscarriage and the death of a girl hours after being born, the Frasers managed to bear a son, Robert Bruce Fraser, although medical complications from the earlier two pregnancies made having more children inadvisable. However, at age five, Robert was killed in a traffic incident after chasing after a stray football, leading to his parents entering a state of mourning and his mother to enter a catatonic state. Wishing to have another child, the Frasers adopt Clariss. As the black daughter of white parents, Clariss was the focus of racist campaign literature from Boyle's campaign (which insinuated infidelity by Louise) during the 1983 general election. Clariss suffered from internalised racism with Andrew catching her attempting to bleach her skin but reassuring her about her race and that both he and Louise loved her.

=== Charles Gurney Seymour ===
The Honourable Charles Gurney Seymour is the second son of the Earl of Bridgwater. When the novel was first published in the United States, the character's name was altered to "Charles Gurney Hampton". As he is the younger of twins (by a mere nine minutes), he does not inherit his father's peerage, shares in a merchant bank, a castle in Scotland or the 20,000-acre (80 km^{2}) family estate. Missing out on such opulence, wealth and power to his harmless brother Rupert whom he despises (a feeling which his brother does not appear to share) leaves him bitter.

==== Education ====
Charles went to Eton College. After leaving school he progressed to Christ Church at the University of Oxford to read history. One night he heard a speech given by then-Prime Minister Sir Winston Churchill. He was so inspired by the speech that he decided to do everything he could to become Prime Minister.

==== Early political career ====
An implacably ambitious and scheming man, Charles was elected the Conservative Party Member of Parliament (MP) for Sussex Downs with a majority in excess of 20,000 votes in the 1964 United Kingdom general election. He set about making himself stand out amongst the new intake of Conservative MPs. He ruthlessly backed Edward Heath for the leadership of the Conservative Party following the resignation of Sir Alec Douglas-Home simply because Heath was most likely to lead the party. His tactics paid off; Heath was elected leader and Charles was rewarded by being elevated to the front bench. His early posts included a stint in the Shadow Chief Whip's Office and the Shadow Local Government and Housing Department.

==== Political rival ====
Charles Seymour always predicted Simon Kerslake was "the only one of his contemporaries who could prevent him from leading the party." He therefore set about to wreck Kerslake's career. He tried to bankrupt him, leaked any scandals he could find about Kerslake, abused his powers as Junior Whip to ensure that Kerslake was absent on crucial votes in the House of Commons, thus causing him to lose favour with the leader, and unsuccessfully attempted to block Kerslake's bid to return to the Commons after his seat was abolished by boundary changes.

==== Cabinet career ====
Although he did not support her in the leadership election following the forced resignation of Edward Heath, Charles later served under Margaret Thatcher as Foreign Secretary and Home Secretary.

==== Leadership contest ====
Charles attempted to succeed Thatcher as Conservative Leader following her resignation. He stood against Kerslake and the foppish MP Alec Pimkin for the leadership. He topped the first ballot with an insufficient majority, prompting a run-off vote, which he lost. He lost the second ballot largely thanks to the defeated Alec Pimkin deciding to vote for Kerslake (he later confessed that he wanted to go to his grave knowing he done at least one decent thing).

Seymour was also damaged by the donation of a famous and expensive family portrait of the First Earl of Bridgewater to the British Museum. The move was perceived by members as being opportunistic, and contributed to Seymour getting a lower 2nd ballot total than on the first ballot.

In reality, the portrait was stolen from him by his ex-wife Fiona, who wanted to inflict maximum personal hurt on Seymour. She made the donation in the midst of the leadership contest knowing Seymour could not ask for its return. Believing that Seymour had donated the portrait himself, many Conservative MPs regarded the act has opportunistic, swaying opinion towards Kerslake.

First Ballot (held on Tuesday 16 May 1989)

1. Charles Seymour 138 votes

2. Simon Kerslake 135 votes

3. Alec Pimkin 15 votes

Second Ballot (held on Tuesday 23 May 1989)

1. Simon Kerslake 158 votes

2. Charles Seymour 130 votes

==== Post-front bench career ====
Charles was depressed about losing the leadership contest. His fate was sealed when his embittered ex-wife sold his story to the tabloid News of the World revealing all his underhand tactics. Kerslake was not bitter, however, and made Charles (who at this point was aging rapidly) numerous offers to return to the front bench. Charles declined them all and at his request became the Speaker of the House of Commons. As Speaker, he hosted a historic dinner at which Queen Elizabeth II revealed her intention to abdicate.

==== Family ====
Charles had a poor relationship with his mother, he detested his brother the Earl, and his two marriages both ended in divorce; his first wife, Fiona, had engaged in an extramarital affair with the chairman of the local Conservative association of Charles' constituency, whilst his second wife, Amanda, secretly sold off several Bridgewater family heirlooms for personal profit. Yet he showed a tremendous devotion to his son Harry, and was devastated when his ex-wife implied that Harry might not be his child (he was delighted when a blood type test suggested that he was, albeit not conclusively).

In the ITV television adaptation of First Among Equals, Charles was played by Jeremy Child.

=== Simon Kerslake ===
Simon Kerslake is a British Conservative Party politician, representing the Coventry Central and later Pucklebridge constituencies, who served under Prime Ministers Edward Heath and Margaret Thatcher. There is a certain amount of autobiographical influence in the character, as he shares Archer's politics, sporting history and a financial scandal that threatens his political career.

==== Personal life ====
Simon is a devoted family man married to Elizabeth (née Drummond), a gynaecologist, with two children, Peter and Michael (in the American edition, Peter and Lucy). His desire to look after his family nearly costs him his political career in the British House of Commons: anxious to give his family the lifestyle he felt they desired, he makes some risky investments, accumulates a lot of debt and only narrowly avoids bankruptcy.

==== Political career ====
Kerslake is a centrist Conservative, hard-working and honourable (despite his poor business judgment).

With only a few political missteps, Kerslake rises steadily through the Conservative Party during his 30-year career. Boundary changes lead to the abolition of his constituency at the February 1974 general election but he finds another and returns to the Commons at the October 1974 general election. He is badly injured by an IRA bomb while serving as Minister of State for Northern Ireland. He serves in a number of other Cabinet posts, including Secretary of State for Defence.

Simon's biggest rival is Charles Gurney Seymour, an aristocratic Conservative MP who does everything he can to stymie and sidetrack him. Simon narrowly survives each attempt to bring him down, and ultimately defeats him in a closely fought contest to be elected Leader of the Conservative Party.

The novel culminates in an extremely close general election in 1991 (the novel was published in 1984). The Labour Party leader, Raymond Gould, becomes Prime Minister in the original British edition of the novel, which ends with King Charles III inviting Kerslake to Buckingham Palace and informing him that he intends to make Gould his first Prime Minister. However, in the US edition, Gould is invited to Buckingham Palace. Charles III then informs him that in fact, Kerslake is to become the Prime Minister.
