= Jeffrey Archer =

English author and politician (1940–2026)

The Right Honourable The Lord Archer of Weston-super-Mare
- Archer in 2012

Member of the House of Lords
- Lord Temporal
- Life peerage 27 July 1992 – 4 July 2024

Member of Parliament for Louth, Lincolnshire
- In office 4 December 1969 – 20 September 1974
- Preceded by: Cyril Osborne
- Succeeded by: Michael Brotherton

Personal details
- Born: Jeffrey Howard Archer; 15 April 1940 London, England
- Died: 5 October 2026 (aged 86) London, England
- Party: Conservative (whip removed)
- Other political affiliations: Non-affiliated (1999–2024)
- Spouse: Mary Weeden (m. 1966)
- Children: 2, including James
- Website: jeffreyarcher.com
- Writing career
- Occupations: Novelist; short story writer; playwright
- Language: English
- Period: 1976–2026
- Genres: Thriller; drama
- Notable works: Kane and Abel; First Among Equals; Not a Penny More, Not a Penny Less

Jeffrey Howard Archer, Baron Archer of Weston-super-Mare (15 April 1940 – 5 October 2026) was an English novelist and politician. He served as Member of Parliament (MP) for Louth, Lincolnshire, from the 1969 by-election until 1974, when he did not seek re-election after almost going bankrupt. Archer revived his fortunes as a novelist with his third novel Kane and Abel (1979). It remains one of the best-selling books in the world, with an estimated 34 million copies sold globally. Overall, his books have sold more than 320 million copies worldwide.

Archer returned to politics and was deputy chairman of the Conservative Party from 1985 to 1986; he resigned after the Daily Star newspaper accused him of paying money to a sex worker, Monica Coghlan. In 1987, he won a libel suit against the paper and was awarded large damages. He was made a life peer in 1992 and subsequently became the first Conservative to be selected as a candidate for mayor of London. He ended his candidacy in 1999 after it emerged that he had lied in the 1987 case. In 2001, he was sentenced to four years in prison for perjury and perverting the course of justice, ending his active political career. He was released early in 2003.

Archer retired from the House of Lords in 2024.

== Early life ==
Jeffrey Howard Archer was born on 15 April 1940 at the City of London Maternity Hospital in Holloway, London. Shortly after Archer's birth, his family moved to Somerset, settling in Weston-super-Mare, where Archer spent most of his early life.

Archer's parents were William Archer (c. 1876–1956) and Lola Archer née Cook (1913–2001). William was 64 years old when Archer was born, and nearly 40 years his wife's senior.

William was a bigamist, fraudster, and conman who impersonated another William Archer, a deceased war medal holder. He was at different times employed as a chewing gum salesman in New York and a mortgage broker in London. In the latter capacity, he was charged at the Old Bailey with a series of fraud offences. On being released on bail, he absconded to the U.S. under the name of William Grimwood. In the U.S., William fathered a child, Rosemary Turner (21 June 1917 – 11 October 1986), Jeffrey's half-sister. In 1940, Rosemary married lawyer Brien McMahon, who went on to become a Democratic senator for Connecticut (1945–1952) and a contender for the Democratic presidential nomination in 1952. After McMahon's death that year, Rosemary married, in 1953, the Ambassador of Belgium to the United States, Baron Robert Silvercruys.

Archer's mother, Lola Archer (born Lola Cook, and later Lola Hayne), became the first female journalist at the family's local paper, The Weston & Somerset Mercury. At 17, Lola had an illegitimate child, a daughter named Wendy, who was given away for adoption. She later met William, and had a second illegitimate child, a son named Jeffrey, who was also given away for adoption. In 1939, William and Lola married; when Jeffrey Howard Archer was born in 1940, he was her third child and first legitimate child.

=== Wellington School ===
In 1951, Archer won a scholarship to Wellington School in Somerset (not Wellington College in Berkshire, as he was later inclined to claim) after passing the 11-plus. At this time his mother, Lola, was employed as a journalist on Weston's local newspaper, the Weston Mercury. She wrote a weekly column entitled "Over the Teacups", and frequently wrote about Jeffrey, calling him Tuppence. Although Archer enjoyed the local fame this brought him, it caused him to be the victim of bullying while at Wellington School.

Archer left school with O-levels in English literature, art and history. He then spent a few years in a variety of jobs, including training with the army and a short period with the Metropolitan Police. He later worked as a physical education teacher, first at Vicar's Hill, a preparatory school in Hampshire, and later at Dover College in Kent.

=== Oxford ===
In 1963, Archer was offered a place at the University of Oxford Delegacy of Extra-Mural Studies to study for a Diploma of Education. The course was based in the department, and Archer became a member of Brasenose College. There have been claims that Archer provided false evidence of his academic qualifications to Brasenose, the apparent citing of an U.S. institution which was actually a bodybuilding club, for instance, in gaining admission to the course. It has also been alleged Archer provided false statements about three non-existent A-Level passes and a U.S. university degree. Although the diploma course only lasted a year, Archer spent a total of three years at Oxford. At Oxford, Archer was successful in athletics, competing in sprinting and hurdling, and became president of the Oxford University Athletic Club in 1965–1966. His opposite number at the University of Cambridge, Wendell Mottley, became a lifelong friend. Television coverage survives of him making false starts in a 1964 sprint race, but he was not disqualified. He gained a blue in athletics and went on to run for England, and once competed for Great Britain. His times of 10.6 seconds for 100 metres and 9.6 seconds for 100 yards (91.44 metres) are the joint second fastest and joint fastest times respectively, by a University of Oxford student.

Archer raised money for the charity Oxfam, obtaining the support of The Beatles in a fundraising drive. The band accepted his invitation to visit the Principal's lodge at Brasenose College, where they were photographed with Archer and dons of the college, although they did not play there. The critic Sheridan Morley, then a student at Merton, was present and recalled the occasion:

At the interval I went to the toilet, and there beside me was Ringo Starr. He asked if I knew this Jeffrey Archer bloke. I said everyone in Oxford was trying to work out who he was. Ringo said: "He strikes me as a nice enough fella, but he's the kind of bloke who would bottle your piss and sell it."

== Early career ==
After leaving Oxford, Archer continued as a charity fundraiser, initially working for the National Birthday Trust, a medical charity that promoted safe childbirth, before joining the United Nations Association (UNA) as its chief fundraiser. The then chairman of the UNA, Humphry Berkeley, alleged that there were numerous discrepancies in Archer's expense claims while he worked at the UNA.

Around this time, Archer began a career in politics, serving as a Conservative councillor for Havering on the Greater London Council (1967–1970).

Archer set up his own fundraising and public relations company, Arrow Enterprises, in 1969. That same year he opened an art gallery, the Archer Gallery, in Mayfair. It specialised in modern art, including pieces by the sculptor and painter Leon Underwood. The gallery ultimately lost money, however, and Archer sold it two years later.

== Member of Parliament ==
At 29, Archer was elected Member of Parliament (MP) for the Lincolnshire constituency of Louth, holding the seat for the Conservative Party in a by-election on 4 December 1969. Archer beat Ian Gow to the selection after winning over a substantial proportion of younger members at the selection meeting. The national party had concerns about Archer's selection, specifically relating to the UNA expenses allegations made by Humphry Berkeley, himself a former Conservative MP. Berkeley tried to persuade the Conservative Central Office that Archer was unsuitable as a parliamentary candidate. Archer brought a defamation action against Berkeley and the story was kept out of the press, although a truncated version of the story did appear in The Times. The case was eventually settled out of court, with Archer agreeing to pay legal costs of around £30,000.

Louth constituency had three key areas: Louth, Cleethorpes, and Immingham. During his time as an MP, Archer was a regular at the Immingham Conservative Club in the most working-class part of the constituency. In 1970 he took part in the Kennedy Memorial Test, a 50-mile (80-kilometre) running/walking race from Louth to Skegness and back.

In parliament, Archer was on the left of the Conservative Party, rebelling against some of his party's policies. He advocated free TV licences for elderly people and was against museum entrance charges. In 1971, he employed David Mellor to deal with his correspondence. He tipped Mellor to reach the cabinet.

== Financial crisis ==
In 1974, Archer was a casualty of a fraudulent investment scheme involving a Canadian company called Aquablast. The debacle lost him his first fortune and left him almost £500,000 in debt. Warned by Daily Mirror reporter Revel Barker – whom he misidentified as a fellow Oxford student – that as a bankrupt he could not be an MP, he announced that he would not be standing in the October 1974 general election "because of financial difficulties".

While he was a witness in the Aquablast case in Toronto in 1975, Archer was accused of stealing three suits from a department store. Archer denied the accusation for many years, but in the late 1990s he finally acknowledged that he had taken the suits, although he claimed that at the time he had not realised he had left the shop. No charges were ever brought.

== Writing career ==
Archer wrote his first book, Not a Penny More, Not a Penny Less, in the autumn of 1974, as a means of avoiding bankruptcy. The book was picked up by the literary agent Deborah Owen and published first in the U.S., then eventually in Britain in the autumn of 1976. A radio adaptation was aired on BBC Radio 4 in the early 1980s and a BBC Television adaptation of the book was broadcast in 1990.

In 1977 Archer published the novel Shall We Tell the President a fictionalized account of a plot to assassinate the President of the United States, with the Commander-in-Chief character being the real U.S. Senator Edward Kennedy, the surviving brother of the late U.S. President John F. Kennedy. Therein the U.S. edition of the book was published by Viking Press, where Kennedy's sister-in-law and former first lady Jacqueline Onassis was then a consulting editor. Although Onassis was not involved in editing Shall We Tell the President?, she was criticized for not trying to deter her employer from publishing a novel about an assassination plot against a member of the Kennedy family. She resigned from Viking Press shortly after the publication. Subsequently, following the success of Kane and Abel and The Prodigal Daughter, Archer published a revised edition of Shall We Tell the President?, replacing Kennedy ( an actual presidential candidate but never the U.S. President) with the fictional character Florentyna Kane (who became president in The Prodigal Daughter) in order to link it with the other two novels.

Kane and Abel (1979) proved to be his best-selling work, auctioning the publishing rights for $3 million, and reaching number one on The New York Times bestseller list. Like most of his early work, it was edited by Richard Cohen, also an Olympic fencing gold-medallist. It was made into a television mini-series by CBS in 1985, starring Peter Strauss and Sam Neill. The following year, Granada TV screened a 10-part adaptation of another Archer bestseller, First Among Equals, which told the story of four men and their quest to become Prime Minister of Great Britain. In the U.S. edition of the novel, the character of Andrew Fraser was eliminated, reducing the number of protagonists to three.

As well as novels and short stories, Archer also penned three stage plays. The first, Beyond Reasonable Doubt, opened in 1987 and ran at the Queen's Theatre in London's West End for over a year. Archer's next play, Exclusive, opened at the Strand Theatre, London, in September 1989. It was not well-received by critics, and closed after a few weeks. His final play, The Accused, opened at the Theatre Royal, Windsor on 26 September 2000, before transferring to the Theatre Royal Haymarket in the West End in December.

In 1988, author Kathleen Burnett accused Archer of plagiarising a story she had written, and including it in his short-story collection, A Twist in the Tale. Archer denied he had plagiarised the story, claiming he had simply been inspired by the idea.

While Archer's books are commercially successful, critics have been generally unfavourable towards his writing. Journalist Hugo Barnacle, writing for The Independent about The Fourth Estate (1996), thought the novel, while demonstrating that "the editors don't seem to have done any work", was "not wholly unsatisfactory".

Archer said that he spent considerable time writing and re-writing each book. He travelled abroad to write the first draft, working in blocks of two hours at a time, then wrote anything up to 17 drafts in total. From 2010 on, Archer wrote the first draft of each new book at his villa in Mallorca, called "Writer's Block".

In 2011, Archer published the first of seven books in The Clifton Chronicles series, which follow the life of Harry Clifton from his birth in 1920, through to his funeral in 1993. The first novel in the series, Only Time Will Tell, tells the story of Clifton from 1920 through to 1940, and was published in the UK on 12 May 2011. The seventh and final novel in the series, This Was a Man, was published on 3 November 2016.

The Short, the Long and the Tall, an illustrated collection of Archer's short stories, was published in November 2020, with watercolour illustrations by artist Paul Cox.

Over My Dead Body was published in 2021, and is the fourth book in a series of thrillers featuring detective William Warwick. The book was critically acclaimed and became a New York Times bestseller.

In January 2020, it was reported that Archer had sued his former literary agents, Curtis Brown, for £500,000 in unpaid royalties.

During the India Global Forum Awards in 2025, Archer stated that he was working on his final novel (Adam & Eve). According to Archer, the idea for the book came to him six years earlier, and he believed the story may surpass Kane and Abel, his best-selling novel, which had reached its 134th reprint at the time. To promote Adam & Eve, Archer and his friend Gyles Brandreth participated in a stage show at the Leicester Square Theatre on 4 October 2026, delivering, then exiting to Puck's farewell speech from A Midsummer Night's Dream, filmed on the eve of his death. The novel was posthumously released for sale on 6 October.

== Return to politics ==
=== Deputy party chairman ===
Archer's political career revived in the 1980s, and he became a popular speaker among the Conservative grass-roots. He was appointed deputy chairman of the Conservative Party by Margaret Thatcher in September 1985. Norman Tebbit, party chairman, had misgivings over the appointment, as did other prominent members of the party, including William Whitelaw and Edward Heath. During his tenure as deputy chairman, Archer was responsible for a number of embarrassing moments, including his statement, made during a live radio interview, that many young, unemployed people were simply unwilling to find work. At the time of Archer's comment, unemployment in the UK stood at a record 3.4 million. Archer was later forced to apologise for the remark, saying that his words had been "taken out of context". Archer resigned as deputy chairman in October 1986 owing to a scandal caused by an article in the News of the World, which led with the story "Tory boss Archer pays vice-girl", and claimed Archer had paid Monica Coghlan, a sex worker, £2,000 through an intermediary at Victoria Station to go abroad.

=== Daily Star libel case ===
Shortly after the News of the World story broke, rival tabloid the Daily Star ran a story alleging Archer had paid for sex with Coghlan, something the News of the World had been careful to avoid stating directly. Archer responded by suing the Daily Star. The case came to court in July 1987. Explaining the payment to Coghlan as the action of a philanthropist rather than that of a guilty man, Archer won the case and was awarded £500,000 damages. Archer stated he would donate the money to charity. However, this case would ultimately result in Archer's final exit from front-line politics some years later. The description the judge (Mr Justice Caulfield) gave of Mrs Archer in his jury instructions included: "Remember Mary Archer in the witness-box. Your vision of her probably will never disappear. Has she elegance? Has she fragrance? Would she have, without the strain of this trial, radiance? How would she appeal? Has she had a happy married life? Has she been able to enjoy, rather than endure, her husband Jeffrey?" The judge then went on to say of Jeffrey Archer: "Is he in need of cold, unloving, rubber-insulated sex in a seedy hotel round about quarter to one on a Tuesday morning after an evening at the Caprice?"

Although the Archers claimed they were a normal, happily married couple, by this time, according to the journalist Adam Raphael, Jeffrey and Mary Archer were living largely separate lives. The editor of the Daily Star, Lloyd Turner, was dismissed six weeks after the trial by the paper's owner, Lord Stevens of Ludgate. Adam Raphael subsequently found proof that Archer had perjured himself at the trial, but his superiors were unwilling to take the risk of a potentially costly libel case. The News of the World later settled out-of-court with Archer, conceding that it too had libelled him.

=== Kurdish charity and peerage ===
When Saddam Hussein suppressed Kurdish uprisings in 1991, Archer, with the Red Cross, set up the charity Simple Truth, a fundraising campaign on behalf of the Kurds. In May 1991, Archer organised a charity pop concert, starring Rod Stewart, Paul Simon, Sting and Gloria Estefan, who all performed free of charge. Archer stated that his charity had raised £57,042,000, though it was later reported that only £3 million came from the Simple Truth concert and appeal, the rest from aid projects sponsored by the British and other governments, with significant amounts pledged before the concert. The charity would later incur further controversy. Having been previously rejected, Archer was made a life peer on 27 July 1992 as Baron Archer of Weston-super-Mare, of Mark in the County of Somerset. Prime Minister John Major recommended him largely because of Archer's role in aid to the Kurds. Archer and Major had been friends for a number of years.

=== Political statements in 1990s ===
In a speech at the 1993 Conservative conference, Archer urged then Home Secretary Michael Howard to "stand and deliver", saying: "Michael, I am sick and tired of being told by old people that they are frightened to open the door, they're frightened to go out at night, frightened to use the parks and byways where their parents and grandparents walked with freedom ... We say to you: stand and deliver!" He then denounced violent films and urged tougher prison conditions to prevent criminals from re-offending. He criticised the role of "do-gooders" and finished off the speech by denouncing the opposition party's law and order policies. This was a time when Archer was actively seeking another front-line political role.

On Question Time on 20 January 1994, Archer said that 18 should be the age of consent for gay sex, as opposed to 21, which it was at the time. Archer, though, was opposed to the age of consent for gay men being 16.

Archer was an opponent of a return to capital punishment. In a February 1999 interview Archer said, "I hope we don't return to extremes. I'm what you might call centre-right but I've always disliked the right wing as much as I've disliked the left wing."

=== Allegations of insider dealings ===
In January 1994, Mary Archer, then a director of Anglia Television, a franchisee in the ITV network, attended a directors' meeting at which an impending takeover of Anglia Television by MAI, which owned fellow ITV franchisee Meridian Broadcasting, was discussed. The following day, Jeffrey Archer bought 50,000 shares in Anglia Television, acting on behalf of a friend, Broosk Saib. Shortly after this, it was announced publicly that the takeover would go ahead. As a result, the shares jumped in value, whereupon Archer sold them on behalf of his friend for a profit of £77,219. The arrangements he made with the stockbrokers meant he did not have to pay at the time of buying the shares.

An inquiry was launched by the Stock Exchange into possible insider trading. The Department of Trade and Industry, headed by Michael Heseltine, announced that Archer would not be prosecuted owing to insufficient evidence. His solicitors admitted that he had made a mistake, but Archer later said that he had been exonerated.

=== London mayoral candidature ===
Archer in 1998

In 1999, Archer had been selected by the Conservative Party as candidate for the London mayoral election of 2000, with the support of two former Prime Ministers, Baroness Thatcher and John Major.

On 21 November 1999, the News of the World published allegations made by Ted Francis, a former friend, that Archer had committed perjury in his 1987 libel case. Archer withdrew his candidature the following day. After the allegations broke, Archer was removed from the Conservative whip; leader William Hague said: "This is the end of politics for Jeffrey Archer. I will not tolerate such behaviour in my party." On 4 February 2000, Archer was expelled from the party for five years.

== Perjury trial and imprisonment ==
=== Trial ===
On 26 September 2000, Archer was charged with perjury and perverting the course of justice during the 1987 libel trial. Ted Francis was charged with perverting the course of justice. At the same time, Archer starred in a production of his own courtroom play The Accused, staged at London's Theatre Royal Haymarket. The play concerned the trial of an alleged murderer and assigned the role of jury to the audience, which voted on the guilt of Archer's character at the end of each performance.

The perjury trial began on 30 May 2001, a month after Monica Coghlan's death in a road traffic collision. Francis alleged that Archer had asked him to provide a false alibi for the night Archer was alleged to have been with Coghlan. Angela Peppiatt, Archer's former personal assistant, also alleged Archer had fabricated an alibi in the 1987 trial. Peppiatt had kept a diary of Archer's movements, which contradicted evidence given during the 1987 trial. Andrina Colquhoun, Archer's former mistress, confirmed that they had been having an affair in the 1980s, contradicting the claim that he and his wife had been "happily married" at the time of the trial.

Archer never spoke during the trial, though his wife Mary again gave evidence as she had done in 1987. On 19 July 2001, Archer was found guilty of perjury and perverting the course of justice at the 1987 trial. He was sentenced to four years' imprisonment by Mr Justice Potts. Francis was found not guilty. Prominent journalists admitted to having accepted Archer's hospitality after he was convicted. Archer's mother died shortly before sentencing and he was released for the day to attend her funeral.

=== Prison ===
Archer was initially sent to HM Prison Belmarsh, a Category A prison, but was moved to HM Prison Wayland, a Category C prison in Norfolk, on 9 August 2001. Although he automatically qualified as a category D prisoner, given it was a first conviction and he did not pose a serious risk of harm to the public, his status was suspended pending a police investigation into allegations about his Kurdish charity. He was transferred to HM Prison North Sea Camp, an open prison, in October 2001. From there he was let out to work, briefly, at the Theatre Royal in Lincoln, and allowed occasional home visits.

Media reports alleged he had abused this privilege by attending a lunch with a friend, Education Secretary Gillian Shephard. During his imprisonment, Archer was visited by a number of high-profile friends, including actor Donald Sinden and entertainer Barry Humphries. Sir Martin Narey, the then Director General of Prisons, wrote after Archer's death that Archer's time in prison was characterized by "appalling behaviour, exploitation of prisoners and staff, and constant manipulation of the media".

In September 2002, Archer was transferred to HM Prison Lincoln, a Category B prison. After three weeks, he was moved to the Category D HM Prison Hollesley Bay in Suffolk.

In October 2002, Archer repaid the Daily Star the £500,000 damages he had received in 1987, as well as legal costs and interest of £1.3 million. That month, he was suspended from Marylebone Cricket Club for seven years.

On 21 July 2003, Archer was released on licence from Hollesley Bay after serving half of his sentence. He remained a peer, as there was no legal provision through which his peerage could be removed at the time other than passing a new Act of Parliament. He also retained membership of the House of Lords, which did not then have the power to expel members; however, Archer did not take an active part in parliamentary proceedings until his retirement from the Lords on 4 July 2024. Politically, he was a non-affiliated member of the House of Lords.

=== Prison diaries ===
While in prison, Archer wrote the three-volume memoir A Prison Diary, with volumes fashioned after Dante's Divine Comedy, and named after the first three prisons in which he was kept. His prison term also served as inspiration for nine of the 12 short stories in the collection Cat O' Nine Tales. According to prisons director Martin Narey, the diaries did "occasionally accurately captur[e] the reality and pain of imprisonment", but were marred by untruths and a lurid exaggeration of what Archer portrayed as hellish conditions in Belmarsh.

=== Kurdish aid allegations ===
In July 2001, shortly after Archer was jailed for perjury, Scotland Yard began investigating allegations that millions of pounds had disappeared from his Kurdish charity. In 1991, Archer had claimed to have raised £57,042,000. In 1992, the Kurdish Disaster Fund wrote to Archer, complaining: "You must be concerned that the Kurdish refugees have seen hardly any of the huge sums raised in the west in their name." Kurdish groups claimed that little more than £250,000 had been received by groups in Iraq.

A British Red Cross-commissioned KPMG audit of the cash showed no donations were handled by Archer and any misappropriation was "unlikely"; however, KPMG also could find no evidence to support Archer's claims to have raised £31.5 million from overseas governments. The police said they would launch a "preliminary assessment of the facts" from the audit but were not investigating the Simple Truth fund.

== Subsequent incidents ==
In 2004, the government of Equatorial Guinea alleged that Archer was one of the financiers of the failed 2004 coup d'état attempt against it, citing bank details and telephone records as evidence. In 2009, Archer said: "I am completely relaxed about it. Mr Mann [Simon Mann, the English mercenary leader of the coup] has made clear that it's nothing to do with me." In 2011, Mann told The Daily Telegraph that his forthcoming book, Cry Havoc, would reveal "the financial involvement of a controversial and internationally famous member of the British House of Lords in the plot, backed up by banking records". He claimed documents from the bank accounts in Guernsey of two companies Mann used as vehicles for organising the coup showed a "J H Archer" paying $135,000 into one of the firms.

== Personal life and death ==
Archer in 2024

Archer married Mary Weeden in July 1966, a 60-year union that lasted until his death. They met at the University of Oxford, where Weeden was studying chemistry at St Anne's College. She went on to specialise in solar energy conversion. They had two children, including James Archer, a financial adviser and businessman.

In 1979, the Archers purchased the Old Vicarage, Grantchester, the setting of Rupert Brooke's famous poem of the same name. Every summer, they hosted a lavish garden party in the grounds to celebrate their wedding anniversary. Following the near-bankruptcy of the Aquablast scandal, by the early 1980s, Archer was back in a comfortable financial position and began to hold shepherd's pie and Krug parties for prominent people at his London penthouse, which overlooked the River Thames and the Houses of Parliament.

On 26 February 2006, on Andrew Marr's Sunday AM programme, Archer said he had no interest in returning to front-line politics and would pursue his writing instead.

As a boy, Archer dreamed of being captain of Bristol Rovers. He remained a fan of the club until his death.

Archer died at his home in London, on 5 October 2026, aged 86.

== Archer in fiction ==
Archer had a brief cameo as himself in the 2001 film Bridget Jones's Diary, where he is depicted attending a book launch hosted by the titular Bridget Jones.

In the 2002 BBC satirical drama Jeffrey Archer: The Truth, Archer was portrayed by Damian Lewis as a misunderstood secret agent and heroic figure who repeatedly saves Britain and humankind. Scriptwriter Guy Jenkin described this exaggerated portrayal: "my Jeffrey Archer is the man who has frequently saved Britain over the last 30 years. He's beloved of all women he comes across, all men, all dogs – he's a superhero."

Ian Hislop and Nick Newman's 1994 BBC Radio 4 satirical series Gush purported to be "written by master storyteller Archie Jeffries".

== Works ==
Archer published 42 works which have been translated into 33 languages, with combined sales of more than 275 million copies.

=== Kane and Abel series ===
- Kane and Abel (1979)
- The Prodigal Daughter (1982)
- Shall We Tell the President? (1986 – revised edition)

=== Clifton Chronicles ===
- Only Time Will Tell (2011)
- The Sins of the Father (2012)
- Best Kept Secret (2013)
- Be Careful What You Wish For (2014)
- Mightier Than the Sword (2015)
- Cometh The Hour (2016)
- This Was a Man (2016)

=== William Warwick series ===
- Nothing Ventured (2019)
- Hidden in Plain Sight (2020)
- Turn a Blind Eye (2021)
- Over My Dead Body (2021)
- Next in Line (2022)
- Traitor's Gate (2023)
- An Eye for an Eye (2024)
- End Game (2025)

=== Other novels ===
- Not a Penny More, Not a Penny Less (1976)
- First Among Equals (1984)
- A Matter of Honour (1986)
- As the Crow Flies (1991)
- Honour Among Thieves (1993)
- The Fourth Estate (1996)
- The Eleventh Commandment (1998)
- Sons of Fortune (2002)
- False Impression (2005)
- The Gospel According to Judas by Benjamin Iscariot, with Francis J. Moloney (2007)
- A Prisoner of Birth (2008)
- Paths of Glory (2009)
- Heads You Win (2018)
- Adam and Eve (2026)

=== Short stories/collections ===
- A Quiver Full of Arrows (including "Old Love") (1980)
- A Twist in the Tale (1988)
- Fools, Knaves, and Heroes: Great Political Short Stories Editor, Introduction. (1991)
- Twelve Red Herrings (1994)
- The Collected Short Stories (1997) Collects A Quiver Full of Arrows, A Twist in the Tale and Twelve Red Herrings
- To Cut a Long Story Short (2000)
- Cat O'Nine Tales (2006)
- And Thereby Hangs a Tale (2010)
- The New Collected Short Stories (2011) Collects To Cut a Long Story Short, Cat O'Nine Tales, and And Thereby Hangs a Tale
- The Jeffrey Archer Short Story Challenge Collection Editor, Contributor (Unique) (2013)
- Four Warned (Quick Reads, 2014) Four shorts stories, all previously published (in Twelve Red Herrings, Cat O'Nine Tales and And Thereby Hangs a Tale)
- It Can't Be October Already (2017) Single short story (included in Cat O'Nine Tales)
- Tell Tale (2017)
- The Short, the Long and the Tall (2020)

=== Plays ===
- Beyond Reasonable Doubt (1987)
- Exclusive (1989)
- The Accused (2000)

=== Prison diaries (non-fiction) ===
1. Belmarsh: Hell (2002)
2. Wayland: Purgatory (2003)
3. North Sea Camp: Heaven (2004)

=== For children ===
- By Royal Appointment (1980)
- Willy Visits the Square World (1980)
- Willy and the Killer Kipper (1981)
- The First Miracle (1994)

== Select filmography ==
Year	Film	Role	Notes
1988	One More Audience with Dame Edna Everage	Himself	Audience Member
1988	Scarfe's Follies	Himself	Documentary film, interviewee
2001	Bridget Jones's Diary	Himself	Cameo appearance
2018	Princess Diana: A Life After Death	Himself	Documentary film, interviewee

== See also ==
- Jonathan Aitken – Archer's contemporary, another Conservative politician imprisoned for perjury
- Chris Huhne – Liberal Democrat politician, imprisoned for perverting the course of justice

Parliament of the United Kingdom
Preceded by Sir Cyril Osborne	Member of Parliament for Louth; 1969–1974	Succeeded by Michael Brotherton
