= Charlie Resnick =

- First appearance: Lonely Hearts
- Last appearance: Darkness, Darkness
- Created by: John Harvey
- Portrayed by: Tom Wilkinson (television, 1992-93); David Fleeshman (stage, 2016)
- Voiced by: Tom Wilkinson; Tom Georgeson; Philip Jackson; Keith Barron

In-universe information
- Gender: Male
- Title: Detective Inspector
- Occupation: Police officer
- Nationality: British

Detective Inspector Charlie Resnick is the protagonist of a series of twelve police procedural novels by British writer John Harvey, based in the city of Nottingham. Resnick is of Polish descent and loves sandwiches and jazz. The series consists of 12 novels and a collection of short stories.

== Publishing history ==
The first novel in the series, Lonely Hearts was published in 1989, and was named by The Times as one of the "100 Greatest Crime Novels of the Century". What was believed to be the final novel in the series, Last Rites, was published in 1998. However, in an interview on BBC Four on 7 November 2006 John Harvey mentioned that he was working on a new novel in the Resnick series. In an interview with the BBC on 20 October 2007, it was confirmed that the novel would be entitled Cold in Hand and would see Resnick retire from the police force. Cold in Hand was published in 2008. The final novel Darkness, Darkness was released in 2013.

== Titles ==
	Title	Year of Publication	Notes
1	Lonely Hearts	1989	
2	Rough Treatment	1990	
3	Cutting Edge	1991	
4	Off Minor	1992	
5	Wasted Years	1993	
6	Cold Light	1994	
7	Living Proof	1995	
8	Easy Meat	1996	
9	Still Water	1997	
10	Last Rites	1998	
11	Now’s the Time	1999	collection of 12 short stories featuring Charlie Resnick
12	Cold in Hand	2008	
13	Darkness, Darkness	2014	

== Adaptations ==
=== Television ===
There were two TV movies made about Resnick, based on Lonely Hearts and Rough Treatment, for the BBC in 1992 and 1993, starring Academy Award nominee Tom Wilkinson as the character. Screenplays for both were written by Harvey himself.

=== Radio ===
Some of the novels have been adapted for radio, with Harvey himself also writing original radio plays featuring the character. They often appear in the rotation on BBC Radio 4 Extra. Numerous actors played Resnick, including Tom Wilkinson, reprising his role from the TV series. The adaptations included:

- Wasted Years (1995) - Starring Tom Wilkinson.
- Cutting Edge (1996) - Starring Tom Georgeson.
- Slow Burn (1998) - Starring Philip Jackson.
- Cheryl (2001) - Starring Keith Barron.
- Bird of Paradise (2002) - Starring Keith Barron.

Sean Baker appeared in all the plays as Sergeant Graham Millington.

=== Stage ===
Harvey adapted the final novel Darkness, Darkness as a play for the Nottingham Playhouse, with David Fleeshman playing Resnick.
