= Jonathan Koch (producer) =

American television producer

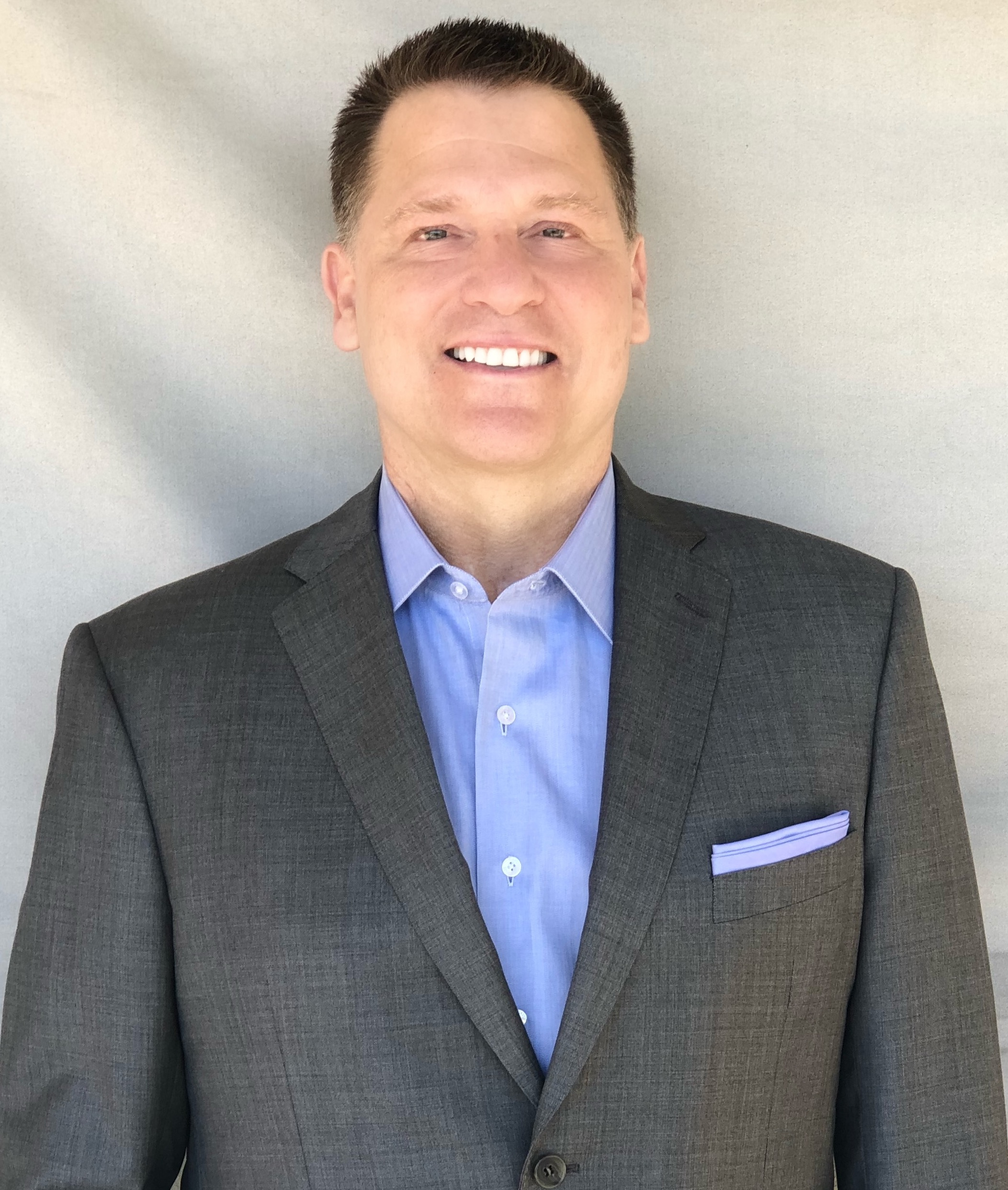
Jonathan Koch, television producer and speaker

Jonathan Koch is an American television producer. He is the president and chief creative officer of Asylum Entertainment, a Los Angeles–based television production company that produced the 2011 miniseries The Kennedys. In 2004, Koch co-authored Pitching Hollywood: How to Sell Your TV Show and Movie Ideas, a film and television pitching manual, with Robert Kosberg.

In 2016, Koch received a hand transplant.

== Hand transplant ==
In 2015, Koch became gravely ill and was hospitalized. On January 26, 2015, at the RealScreen Summit in Washington, D.C., he went to George Washington University Hospital with a 102 degree temperature. Two days later, he was put into a propofol-induced coma. The following day, he was in full-blown septic shock and his hands and feet were turning blue. Koch's hands and feet became necrotic, and he eventually lost the bottom part of his right leg, parts of his fingers on his right hand, and all of his toes.

In April 2015, after delaying the amputation of his left hand, Koch returned to Los Angeles and met UCLA's Dr. Kodi Azari, who was heading up hand transplant trials. In October 2016, a donor became available, and Koch underwent a 17-hour hand transplant surgery.

== Selected filmography ==
- Beyond the Glory (2001–2006)
- American Gangster (2006–2009)
- The Locator (2008–2010)
- Addicted (2010–2012)
- The Kennedys (2011)
- Urban Tarzan (2013)
- Ring of Fire (2013)
- Beverly Hills Pawn (2013–2015)
- ESPN 30 for 30 – The Price of Gold (2014)
- Small Time (2014)
- Happy Valley (2014)
- The Secret Life of Marilyn Monroe (2015)
- The Kennedys: After Camelot (2017)
