= List of awards and nominations received by Tom Wilkinson =

Tom Wilkinson awards and nominations
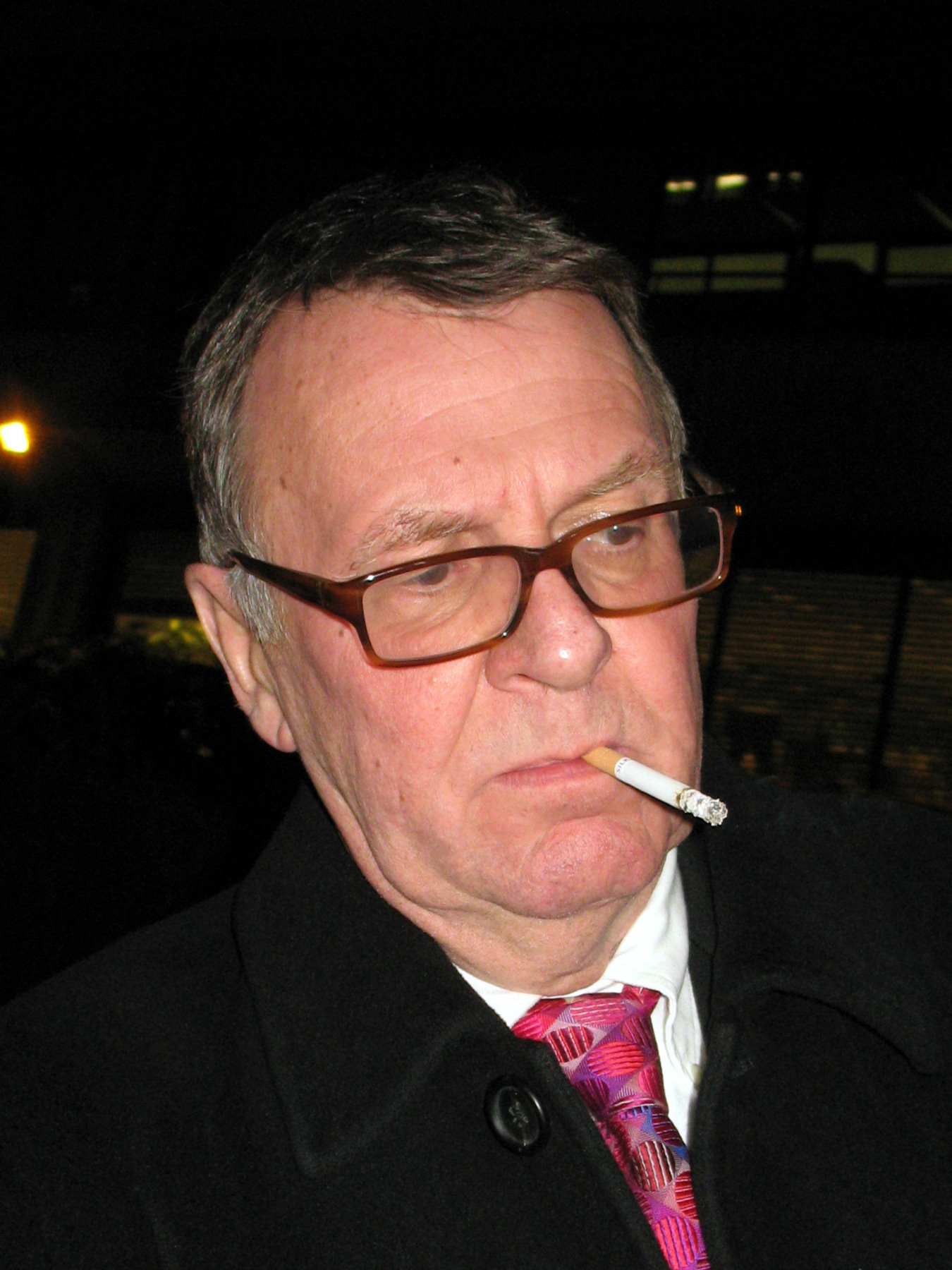
- Wilkinson in 2009
Awards and nominations
Award	Wins	Nominations
Academy Awards	0	2
BAFTA Awards	1	6
Primetime Emmy Awards	1	4
Golden Globes	1	4
SAG Awards	2	8
Olivier Awards	0	2

Totals (Note: Certain award groups do not simply award one winner. They acknowledge several different recipients, have runners-up, and have third place. Since this is a specific recognition and is different from losing an award, runner-up mentions are considered wins in this award tally. For simplification and to avoid errors, each award in this list has been presumed to have had a prior nomination.)
- Wins: 67
- Nominations: 122

This article is a list of awards and nominations received by Tom Wilkinson.

Tom Wilkinson was a British actor known for his roles in on stage and screen. Over his career he received numerous accolades including a BAFTA Award, a Golden Globe Award, a Emmy Award, and two Screen Actors Guild Awards as well as nominations for two Academy Awards.

Wilkinson has received nominations for two Academy Awards: his first for Best Actor for his portrayal of a grieving father in the Todd Field drama In the Bedroom (2001) and his second for Best Supporting Actor for playing an unstable attorney in the Tony Gilroy thriller Michael Clayton (2007). He won the BAFTA Award for Best Actor in a Supporting Role for his role as a foreman turned dancer in the comedy The Full Monty (1997). He was BAFTA-nominated for his performances in Shakespeare in Love (1998), In the Bedroom (2001), and Michael Clayton (2007).

On television, Wilkinson portrayed Benjamin Franklin in the HBO historical miniseries John Adams (2008) for which he received the Primetime Emmy Award for Outstanding Supporting Actor in a Limited or Anthology Series or Movie, and Golden Globe Award for Best Supporting Actor – Series, Miniseries or Television Film as well as a nomination for the Screen Actors Guild Award for Outstanding Performance by a Male Actor in a Miniseries or Television Movie. He was Emmy-nominated for his portrayals as a transsexual factory worker in the HBO television movie Normal (2003), James Baker in the HBO political drama Recount (2008), and Joseph P. Kennedy Sr. in the historical miniseries The Kennedys (2011).

On the West End stage, he was nominated for two Laurence Olivier Awards, his first for Best Actor in a Supporting Role for playing Horatio in a revival of the William Shakespeare tragedy Hamlet (1981), and his second for Actor of the Year in a Revival playing a Dr. Thomas Stockman, the conscientious doctor in a small town, in the revival of the Henrik Ibsen play An Enemy of the People (1988).

== Major associations ==
=== Academy Awards ===
Year	Category	Nominated work	Result	Ref.
2002	Best Actor	In the Bedroom	Nominated	
2008	Best Supporting Actor	Michael Clayton	Nominated	

=== BAFTA Awards ===
Year	Category	Nominated work	Result	Ref.
British Academy Film Award
1998	Best Actor in a Supporting Role	The Full Monty	Won	
1999	Best Actor in a Supporting Role	Shakespeare in Love	Nominated	
2002	Best Actor in a Leading Role	In the Bedroom	Nominated	
2008	Best Actor in a Supporting Role	Michael Clayton	Nominated	
British Academy Television Award
1994	Best Actor	Martin Chuzzlewit	Nominated	
1997	Best Actor	Cold Enough for Snow	Nominated	

=== Emmy Awards ===
Year	Category	Nominated work	Result	Ref.
Primetime Emmy Awards
2003	Outstanding Lead Actor in a Miniseries or a Movie	Normal	Nominated	
2008	Outstanding Lead Actor in a Miniseries or a Movie	Recount	Nominated	
2008	Outstanding Supporting Actor in a Miniseries or a Movie	John Adams	Won	
2011	Outstanding Supporting Actor in a Miniseries or a Movie	The Kennedys	Nominated	

=== Golden Globe Awards ===
Year	Category	Nominated work	Result	Ref.
2004	Best Actor – Miniseries or Television Film	Normal	Nominated	
2008	Best Supporting Actor – Motion Picture	Michael Clayton	Nominated	
2009	Best Supporting Actor – Television	John Adams	Won	
2009	Best Actor – Miniseries or Television Film	Recount	Nominated	

=== Laurence Olivier Awards ===
Year	Category	Nominated work	Result	Ref.
1981	Best Actor in a Supporting Role	Hamlet	Nominated	
1988	Actor of the Year in a Revival	An Enemy of the People	Nominated	

=== Screen Actors Guild Awards ===
Year	Category	Nominated work	Result	Ref.
1998	Outstanding Cast in a Motion Picture	The Full Monty	Won	
1999	Outstanding Cast in a Motion Picture	Shakespeare in Love	Won	
2002	Outstanding Cast in a Motion Picture	In the Bedroom	Nominated	
2002	Outstanding Actor in a Leading Role	In the Bedroom	Nominated	
2008	Outstanding Actor in a Supporting Role	Michael Clayton	Nominated	
2009	Outstanding Actor in a Miniseries or Television Movie	John Adams	Nominated	
2010	Outstanding Actor in a Miniseries or Television Movie	A Number	Nominated	
2012	Outstanding Cast in a Motion Picture	The Best Exotic Marigold Hotel	Nominated	

== Miscellaneous awards ==
Year	Award	Category	Nominated work	Result
1997	MTV Movie Award	Best Dance Sequence	The Full Monty	Nominated
2001	American Film Institute Award	Actor of the Year	In the Bedroom	Nominated
2001	Chicago Film Critics Association Award	Best Actor	In the Bedroom	Nominated
2001	Dallas–Fort Worth Film Critics Association Award	Best Actor	In the Bedroom	Nominated
2001	Independent Spirit Award	Best Male Lead	In the Bedroom	Won
2001	Las Vegas Film Critics Society Award	Best Actor	In the Bedroom	Nominated
2001	Los Angeles Film Critics Association Award	Best Actor	In the Bedroom	Nominated
2001	National Society of Film Critics Award	Best Actor	In the Bedroom	Nominated
2001	New York Film Critics Circle Award	Best Actor	In the Bedroom	Won
2001	New York Film Critics Online Award	Best Actor	In the Bedroom	Won
2001	Online Film Critics Society Award	Best Actor	In the Bedroom	Nominated
2001	Southeastern Film Critics Association Award	Best Actor	In the Bedroom	Nominated
2001	Sundance Film Festival Award	Special Jury Prize for Dramatic Acting	In the Bedroom	Won
2001	Vancouver Film Critics Circle Award	Best Actor	In the Bedroom	Nominated
2001	Satellite Award	Best Actor – Miniseries or Television Film	Normal	Nominated
2005	London Film Critics' Circle Award	British Actor of the Year	Separate Lies	Nominated
2007	Chicago Film Critics Association Award	Best Supporting Actor	Michael Clayton	Nominated
2007	Dallas–Fort Worth Film Critics Association Award	Best Supporting Actor	Michael Clayton	Nominated
2007	London Film Critics' Circle Award	British Supporting Actor of the Year	Michael Clayton	Won
2007	London Film Critics' Circle Award	British Actor of the Year	Michael Clayton	Nominated
2007	Online Film Critics Society Award	Best Supporting Actor	Michael Clayton	Nominated
2007	Prism Award	Performance in a Feature Film	Michael Clayton	Nominated
2007	San Diego Film Critics Society Award	Best Supporting Actor	Michael Clayton	Nominated
2007	San Diego Film Critics Society Award	Best Supporting Actor – Motion Picture	Michael Clayton	Won
2007	St. Louis Gateway Film Critics Association Award	Best Supporting Actor	Michael Clayton	Nominated
2007	Vancouver Film Critics Circle Award	Best Supporting Actor	Michael Clayton	Nominated
2006	Monte-Carlo Television Festival Award	Outstanding Actor – Miniseries	John Adams	Nominated
2006	Satellite Award	Best Actor – Miniseries or Television Film	Recount	Nominated
2009	San Diego Film Critics Society Award	Best Cast	44 Inch Chest	Won
2011	Monte-Carlo Television Festival Award	Mini-Series – Best Performance by an Actor	The Kennedys	Nominated
2012	British Independent Film Award	Best Supporting Actor	The Best Exotic Marigold Hotel	Nominated
