= Diana Hardcastle =

English actress (born 1949)

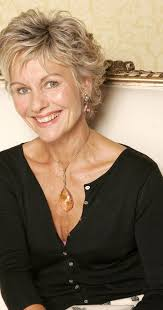
- Born: 12 July 1949 (age 77); London, England
- Occupation: Actress
- Years active: 1982–present
- Spouse: Tom Wilkinson (m. 1988; died 2023)
- Children: 2

Diana Hardcastle Wilkinson (born 12 July 1949) is an English actress who has appeared largely in television roles.

== Career ==
Hardcastle has appeared in episodes of Midsomer Murders, Inspector Lynley and Taggart. She played recurring roles in the series First Among Equals and Fortunes of War.

In 2011, Hardcastle and actor Tom Wilkinson, her husband, portrayed real-life husband and wife Joe and Rose Kennedy in the mini series The Kennedys.

In 2012, she had a supporting role in the film The Best Exotic Marigold Hotel, in which her husband starred (their characters did not interact), and a returning role in the 2015 sequel The Second Best Exotic Marigold Hotel. Wilkinson and Hardcastle again played husband and wife in Good People (2014) and played brother-in-law and sister-in-law in the television series Belgravia (2020).

== Filmography ==
=== Film ===
Year	Title	Roles	Notes
2004	If Only	Claire	
2004	A Good Woman	Lady Plymdale	
2005	Chromophobia	Mrs. Wharton	
2011	The Best Exotic Marigold Hotel	Carol Parr	
2014	Good People	Marie Halden	
2015	The Second Best Exotic Marigold Hotel	Carol Parr	
2015	Jenny's Wedding	Ellen O'Leary	
2016	The Boy	Mrs. Heelshire	

=== Television ===
Year	Title	Roles	Notes
1982	East Lynne	Wilson	Television film
1984	The House	Mrs. Janek	Television film
1985	Love Song	Philippa Jameson Hatchard	Television film
1983	Reilly, Ace of Spies	Anna	Episode: "Anna"
1984	Charlie	Ainsworth's secretary	Episode: "Charlie Is My Darling"
1986	Screen Two	Judith Walters	Episode: "Frankie and Johnnie"
1986	First Among Equals	Louise Fraser	9 episodes
1987	Fortunes of War	Edwina Little	3 episodes
1988–92	That's Love	Patsy	26 episodes
1992	Boon	Kate Newsome	Episode: "Message in a Bottle"
1993	Punchdrunk	Vikki Brown	6 episodes
1993	Resnick: Rough Treatment	Claire Millinder	Television film
1996	The Tide of Life	Rona Birch	Episode: "No. 1.2"
1997	Midsomer Murders	Barbara Lessiter	Episode: "The Killings at Badger's Drift"
1997	Bugs	Elaine Harman	Episode: "Identity Crisis"
1999	The Bill	Ruth Watts	Episode: "Kiss Chase"
1999	Taggart	Mariah Strange	Episode: "Fearful Lightning"
2003	Holby City	Pam Wilkinson	Episode: "On the Inside"
2004	Rosemary & Thyme	Crystal	Episode: "The Gongoozlers"
2006	The Inspector Lynley Mysteries	Deborah Proctor	Episode: "Chinese Walls"
2008	Doctors	Penny Healey-Henderson	Episode: "Very Important Prisoner"
2010	Silent Witness	Mary Bradburn	2 episodes
2010	Doctors	Pam Phillips	Episode: "Man in the Mirror"
2011	The Kennedys	Rose Kennedy	7 episodes
2012	Doctors	Wendy Barron	Episode: "Reports of My Death"
2012	Holby City	Faith Pearson	Episode: "Eastern Promise"
2012	DCI Banks	Defence Barrister Vizard	Episode: "Innocent Graves: Part 1"
2013	Utopia	CIA Woman	Episode: "No. 1.2"
2017	The Kennedys: After Camelot	Rose Kennedy	4 episodes
2020	Belgravia	Grace Bellasis	TV series
2020	Shakespeare & Hathaway: Private Investigators	Lady Athena Forbes-Allen	episode 3.5 "Thy Fury Spent"

== Personal life ==
Hardcastle was married to English actor Tom Wilkinson until his death in December 2023. They have two daughters, Alice, born in 1988, and Molly, born in 1991.
