= Snowpiercer =

2013 film by Bong Joon Ho

- US theatrical release poster
- Hangul: 설국열차
- Hanja: 雪國列車
- RR: Seolgungnyeolcha
- MR: Sŏlgungnyŏlch'a
- Directed by: Bong Joon Ho
- Screenplay by: Bong Joon Ho; Kelly Masterson
- Story by: Bong Joon Ho
- Based on: Le Transperceneige by: Jacques Lob; Benjamin Legrand; Jean-Marc Rochette
- Produced by: Jeong Tae-sung; Steven Nam; Park Chan-wook; Lee Tae-hun
- Starring: Chris Evans; Song Kang-ho; Tilda Swinton; Jamie Bell; Octavia Spencer; Ewen Bremner; Go Ah-sung; John Hurt; Ed Harris
- Cinematography: Hong Kyung-pyo
- Edited by: Steve M. Choe; Kim Chang-ju
- Music by: Marco Beltrami
- Production companies: CJ Entertainment; Moho Film; Opus Pictures; Stillking Films
- Distributed by: CJ Entertainment (South Korea); Radius-TWC (United States); Le Pacte and Wild Side Films (France); Bontonfilm (Czech Republic)
- Release dates: 29 July 2013 (Times Square); 1 August 2013 (South Korea); 30 October 2013 (France); 27 June 2014 (United States); 27 April 2016 (Czech Republic)
- Running time: 126 minutes
- Countries: South Korea; United States; France; Czech Republic
- Languages: English; Korean
- Budget: $40 million
- Box office: $86.8 million

Snowpiercer (Korean: 설국열차; Hanja: 雪國列車; RR: Seolgungnyeolcha) is a 2013 post-apocalyptic action thriller film based on the French climate fiction graphic novel Le Transperceneige by Jacques Lob, Benjamin Legrand and Jean-Marc Rochette. The film was directed by Bong Joon Ho and written by Bong and Kelly Masterson. An international co-production, the film marks Bong's English-language debut; almost 85% of the film's dialogue is in English.

The film stars Chris Evans, Song Kang-ho, Tilda Swinton, Jamie Bell, Octavia Spencer, Go Ah-sung, John Hurt, and Ed Harris, with Park Chan-wook and Lee Tae-hun among the film's producers. It takes place aboard the Snowpiercer train as it travels a globe-encircling track, carrying the last remnants of humanity after a failed attempt at climate engineering to stop global warming has created a new Snowball Earth. Evans stars as Curtis Everett, leader of the lower-class tail-section passengers, as they rebel against the elite of the front of the train. Filming took place at Barrandov Studios in Prague, using train car sets mounted on gimbals to simulate the train's motion.

Snowpiercer received critical acclaim and appeared on many film critics' top ten lists of 2014 after its international release, with praise for its vision, direction, and performances, particularly by Evans and Swinton. In the United States, the film was initially planned for a limited-screen showing, but the critical response prompted The Weinstein Company to expand the showing to more theaters and to digital streaming services. With a budget of $40 million, it remains one of the most expensive South Korean productions ever. The fourth volume of the original Snowpiercer graphic novel series, Snowpiercer: Terminus, published in 2019, serves as a sequel to the film, establishing it as being set in the same continuity as the original graphic novels. The film was also the basis for a television series set in a different continuity that aired from 2020 to 2024, with Bong, Park and Lee serving as executive producers.

== Plot ==
In 2031, 17 years after an attempt to stop climate change via stratospheric aerosol injection with the compound CW-7 catastrophically backfired, creating a new ice age that destroyed life on Earth, the remnants of humanity shelter in a state-of-the-art self-sustaining circumnavigational train, the Snowpiercer, run by reclusive transportation magnate Wilford. The passengers on the train are segregated, with the elite in the extravagant front cars and the poor crammed into squalid tail compartments overseen by armed guards.

Urged by his mentor Gilliam, Curtis Everett and his second-in-command, Edgar, lead the tail passengers in a revolt. They discover that the guards have no ammunition and overwhelm them, freeing Namgoong Minsoo, a captive security specialist. For his assistance, they bribe him with Kronole, an addictive drug made from industrial waste. Namgoong also insists that his clairvoyant daughter, Yona, be freed. Curtis and his fellow revolutionaries discover that the protein bars they were being fed were made of dead cockroaches. Namgoong helps the tail mob advance, but they face guards armed with melee weapons and overseen by Minister Mason. Edgar is held hostage, but Curtis allows him to be killed to capture Mason, forcing her to order the remaining guards to surrender. The tail mob stays back, holding the guards captive, while Curtis takes Mason, Namgoong, Yona, skilled fighter Grey, and Tanya and Andrew (two parents who had their children taken from them) towards the front of the train.

Curtis's group travels through several opulent cars. Namgoong and Yona recognize a landmark outside and speculate that the ice may be thawing more and more with every passing year. The group reaches a schoolroom, where a teacher is indoctrinating the children on Wilford's greatness. A bald man brings eggs for the children to celebrate the train's eighteenth circumnavigation of the Earth. Then the bald man goes to the tail army and shoots them with automatic firearms hidden under the eggs. The captured guards are freed, as is Mason's henchman, Franco. The teacher, who received a gun from the bald man, kills Andrew before Grey kills her. Franco broadcasts to the classroom his execution of Gilliam, which prompts Curtis to execute Mason in turn. Curtis's group moves on, but Franco catches up with them, killing Grey and Tanya. Franco is then seemingly killed by Curtis and Namgoong.

In the last compartment before the engine, Namgoong reveals that he collected the Kronole to use it as an explosive to escape the train with Yona, believing they can now survive outside, pointing out the melting ice. Curtis explains that in the early days of the train, the tail section resorted to cannibalism. Edgar was an infant when Curtis killed his mother, and Curtis was going to eat him when Gilliam offered his severed arm instead, stopping the bloodshed. Curtis wants to confront Wilford for causing such horrors. Wilford's assistant, Claude, emerges from behind the engine room door to invite Curtis inside.

Curtis meets Wilford and, to his shock, learns that he and Gilliam conspired to stage Curtis's rebellion to reduce the tail section's population to sustainable levels. After ordering the execution of most of the tail section residents, Wilford offers Curtis his position leading the train. Curtis appears ready to accept as Yona overpowers Claude, rushes in, and asks for a match. In desperation, she pulls open a floorboard to reveal Tanya's son, Timmy, who has been enslaved to work as a replacement for a broken machine part. Appalled, Curtis pummels Wilford and rescues Timmy from the machinery, losing his arm in the process. Andy, Andrew's missing son, crawls out of a nook and climbs into the engine core despite Curtis's pleas. Curtis gives Yona the match to light the fuse for the Kronole bomb, while Namgoong fights and kills Franco, who followed them. Damaged by the fighting, the door to the engine room cannot be closed, forcing Curtis and Namgoong to use their bodies to protect Yona and Timmy from the blast.

The explosion triggers an avalanche that derails the train and wrecks it. Curtis and Namgoong are unresponsive, so Yona and Timmy escape the wreckage. They see a polar bear in the distance, indicating that life exists outside the train and has not died out, as they were always led to believe.

== Cast ==
- Chris Evans as Curtis Everett:
  The leader of the revolution. About the character of Curtis, Evans said, "I mean, for me, the tail section is, I think that's Curtis. I think that's who he is. The tail section is hard; it's grinding; it's tough; it's real. So that's where I had the most fun. Back there." Casting directors suggested Evans to Bong, who initially had misconceptions of Evans before they met due to the "caricature of the American all muscle", but quickly departed from that notion and described Evans as "actually very sensitive and has a quiet and introverted side. He's a very, very smart person, and he's a director." Bong was introduced to the films Puncture and Sunshine where he described Evans's performances as showing his "sensitive acting abilities". Bong and Evans spent months talking about the dialogue, and Bong received help from the cast and crew including Evans due to it being his first English language film. Bong said that for the role of Curtis, hiding Evans's muscular physique was the most difficult thing about working with the actor, explaining, "He's supposed to be in the poor tail section for 17 years, eating only protein blocks, and it was tricky to hide all of that muscle mass with costume and make-up." On whether he was surprised by the fan response, Evans said, "I've been surprised about everything about this movie. Every movie you make, you hope people will enjoy it, but this movie has surpassed all of my expectations across the board."
- Song Kang-ho as Namgoong Minsoo:
  The specialist who designed the security features on the train. On taking the role, Song said, "This was the third time I worked with director Bong, and working with director Bong is a wonderful experience.... [T]his time around, working with the wonderful cast members was a tremendous experience." Describing Namgoong, Bong said, "He sets up the ending, because he has a vision about this world that's different from Curtis's. He has a desire to go outside of the train." On the name of the character, Bong stated, "I was looking for a name that would be most difficult for foreigners to pronounce. Namgoong ... it is difficult. There are some name-related jokes in the film." Song plays a character who only speaks Korean, and although as difficult as it was, he said, "at the same time, it was very refreshing and fun to do".
- Ed Harris as Wilford:
  The creator and caretaker of the engine. Dustin Hoffman was considered for the role. About the character, Harris said, "He's so built up, who this guy is, and then there's this big thing open, and he's just this old guy making dinner with his robe on, but director Bong really wanted him to be matter-of-fact and very mundane, and simple, and kind of freaky that way." Harris also added that the character is "probably a coagulation of various folks". The role of Wilford was the last to be cast, and it was friend and fellow filmmaker Park Chan-Wook who suggested Harris for the role. Bong stated that Wilford needed to be played by someone with "tremendous presence and performance from the first moment that he appeared in order to convince the audience", adding that "[Harris] turned Wilford into a lively and ironic character with added appeal." On taking the role of Wilford, Harris mentioned, "When I was sent this script, I was told director Bong is a Korean director, and that he'd made some other films, but I had never seen any of them ... I thought they were wonderfully accomplished films, which really made me want to work with the guy. I'm a big fan of his." Harris praised Bong very highly, especially his tendency of editing the piece whilst shooting. Since the film's release, Bong has revealed background information about the character, such as Wilford being bisexual, "He slept with Claude, the Egghead, Mason, and the pregnant teacher. Yet, his 'the One' is the Engine." Tyler John Williams portrays a young Wilford.
- John Hurt as Gilliam:
  The spiritual leader of the tail section. Bong first saw Hurt in The Elephant Man while at middle-school, which made him curious about the actor; for the part of Gilliam he wanted an older actor, though one with the ability to "exude the ambience of spirituality". On the character of Gilliam, Hurt said, "He is certainly shadowy, but he is shadowy for a reason. Even though I still am not entirely certain what the reason is," adding, "as far as Gilliam is concerned, he believes in the status quo, but he also sees himself as a true humanitarian. I mean he has literally given his limbs to these people." Hurt stated that the role of Gilliam was physically challenging one at that, because "the fact that I had one leg strapped behind me, trying to stagger around on those not very easy-to-use crutches... and having to make it look like as though I'd been doing it for years." He too acknowledged Bong's encouragement of collaboration in allowing the cast and crew to "interpret things as we want, as we see fit" as well as adding pointers to the act. Hurt said of Bong, "I just fell in love with him. He was wonderful. I hadn't seen anything. I hadn't seen Mother or anything, which I immediately did when I got home. I went, 'Wow, that's the chap I was talking to.' Thank God instinct has left me completely. I adored him then, I adored him ever since." as well as previously adding, "He is quite different but technically, he is as clever as Hitchcock. That's saying something.... He is one of the best directors I've worked with. I absolutely adore working with him."
- Tilda Swinton as Minister Mason:
  Wilford's right hand, the second in command on the train and the spokesperson for Wilford for the past 17 years. About the character, Swinton said, "Mason is a pretty monstrous construct so we felt we were dealing with extremes, but the truth was that we didn't have to go that far. Look at Hitler with his dyed black hair and Gaddafi with handmade medals stuck on his jacket." Swinton prepared for the role by studying clowning politicians throughout history, and Mason is, in Swinton's words, "a complete smash cut of all the monstrous, maniacal, political clowns". Swinton added that the character is a mix of Margaret Thatcher, Muammar Gaddafi, Adolf Hitler, and Silvio Berlusconi. The Yorkshire accent Swinton uses is based on someone from her early life who had the accent and to her, "was an early example of authority". Tilda and Bong met at the Cannes Film Festival when We Need to Talk About Kevin played and both wanted to work together. In one original scenario, Mason was a middle-aged man and first mentioned as "peaceful", so Bong changed it and offered it to Swinton. Bong added, "I originally talked to John C. Reilly about playing Mason." On Mason's appearance, Bong stated, "Tilda actually wanted to take the look further and I had to pull her back. She at the time really wanted to transform herself and look different than she ever looked before. I was all for it. Obviously, there was something that started the whole look." Additionally, Swinton stated, "As we were playing, we had these ideas, like fantastic pendulous breasts... And Jamie Bell loved wearing them of course. We have a picture of him. Our crew picture involves [Bell] wearing Mason's breasts." Bong was inspired by a photo Ondřej Nekvasil found of a lady inside the National Museum of Natural History, and he showed the image to Tilda who "loved it". The appearance of Mason was based on Roxie Collie Laybourne.
- Jamie Bell as Edgar:
  Curtis's second-in-command. On taking the role, Bell said, "The reason why I wanted to be a part of the film was because of what Director Bong had to say about it; it was his vision that he brought to the table and I thought what it stood for was important to me." When asked of performances that were interpreted differently onscreen from the screenplay, writer Masterson stated, "[Bell] is very impish and mischievous as Edgar, which I didn't predict from his character. That might just be Jamie." and of his performance, "I think [Bell]'s performance, a lot of it is improvised, and quite brilliantly." On relating to the character, Bell said, "You know, I come from a very working-class background myself. There was the sense that I had to overcome something and really test myself. So, in a way Edgar is very similar, he genuinely doesn't have anything and he's the lowest of the low of these people."
- Octavia Spencer as Tanya:
  A determined mother who is set on getting her son back. Despite not possessing the qualities of a fighter, she nonetheless takes part in the rebellion and speaks for the people of the tail section. The film marks Spencer's first time working in the science-fiction genre. Spencer described Bong as "an auteur" and expressed sadness at the studio's proposal to cut the film. On imagery from the history base of references, Bong said, "When [Spencer]'s character is being beaten by the soldier, it's meant to remind people, somewhat, of the Rodney King incident." On the message of the film, Spencer said, "We are all covered in smoke and dirt from years and years of not washing and particles in the air, and we are all the same color if you look at it."
- Ewen Bremner as Andrew:
  A helpless father whose only wish is to protect his son. On taking the role, Bremner said, "I watched director Bong's film Mother which I was really knocked out by. He has a much adventurous sense of a character and he's a rare director in his route to cast actors that he really likes." Despite the weak and frail imagery of the character of Andrew, Bong needed an actor who was able to convey the raw emotion of the character to the audience directly. Bong became a fan of Bremner's after watching his appearance in Naked. On Bremner, Bong said, "He would become an actor like Byun Hee-bong one day."
- Go Ah-sung (credited as Ko Asung) as Namgoong Yona:
  The 17-year-old daughter of Namgoong Minsoo. On taking the role, Go said, "It was like going back to where it all started. Director Bong gave instructions and Mr. Song gave me advice or guidance, so it felt like I had returned to being on my first film, The Host." About her character's name, Go said, "[Bong] couldn't think of any name for Yona; he just left her as "The Inuit Girl". I gave him Nastyona's album, and he went "This is it!" adding, "It also matches the Biblical figure Jonah [pronounced Yona in some languages, including Korean] and had a right feel to it." She added that she spoke with a mixed accent of the United States, Philippines and India, and spoke to fellow cast member Ewen Bremner for advice on her English pronunciation. Go described Yona as being, "someone who was completely indifferent to Minsoo's ambition. Even if she knew, she wouldn't have cared." Of Yona's background, Bong revealed, "Yona's mother was the leader of the Frozen Seven's revolution—because she was an Inuit. She was confident that she could endure the coldness. However, she went out too early."
- Alison Pill as Teacher:
  Found teaching a classroom of young students, towards the front of the Snowpiercer.
- Vlad Ivanov as Franco the Elder:
  A seemingly indestructible henchman working for Minister Mason.
- Luke Pasqualino as Grey:
  Gilliam's bodyguard, a muscular, agile, fast-moving warrior who is handy with knives. On taking the role of Grey, Pasqualino said, "I got to work with a dream cast and [Bong] who I think is frankly a genius. I feel very lucky and privileged to be given the opportunity". Grey has various tattoos on his body, each seeming having a specific story, including Gilliam's name tattooed on the heart side of his chest. After the film's release Bong revealed background information, "There are homosexual relationships among the men. Gilliam and Grey seem like a couple with a large age gap. Gilliam is someone whom Grey admires deeply, of course, but one could imagine they sleep together too. And Gilliam sends Grey to Curtis."

Additionally, Adnan Hasković as Franco the Younger, an executor of the army led by Mason; Clark Middleton as the Painter, who is often seen drawing other passengers or key events visually chronicling underclass life and death; Emma Levie as Claude, Wilford's assistant who may have a relationship with Wilford; Tómas Lemarquis as Egg-head, one of Wilford's agents that aids in the New Year celebration massacre; Steve Park as Fuyu, a regimented assistant to Mason; and Paul Lazar as Paul, one of the rebels in Curtis's army who makes the protein blocks. The creators of the graphic novel, Jean-Marc Rochette and Benjamin Legrand, have cameo appearances in the film.

== Production ==
=== Development ===
When I first came across Transperceneige, the first thing that grabbed my attention was the unique cinematic space of a train. Hundreds of metal pieces moving like a snake carrying people squirming inside gripped my heart. And the people were fighting against each other. They were not equal in this Noah's ark that held the last survivors as they were divided into cars.

— Bong Joon Ho, speaking on what captivated him to the story

In the winter of 2005, Bong found Jean-Marc Rochette's French graphic novel series Le Transperceneige at a comic book shop near Hongik University and finished reading the entire series while standing in front of the bookshelf where he found it. He was fascinated by ideas of people struggling on the train for survival, and how every section is classified in social stratification. Bong showed the series to his friends, fellow director Park Chan-wook and producer Lee Tae-hun, who loved it as well. Although Bong praised the original graphic novel, he soon realized that a film like Snowpiercer needed an original take. Bong stated, "... I had to come up with a completely new story and new characters in order to create a new, dynamic Snowpiercer that was packed with cinematic exhilaration."

In the following year, Park's production company Moho Film acquired the copyrights to the original story of Snowpiercer for Bong, and in 2007 the copyrights to the story extended. The first draft of the screenplay for Snowpiercer was completed on 15 September 2010, and in December, the second draft of screenplay was completed and modified. On 4 October 2010, Bong, whilst at the Vancouver International Film Festival, had initially entertained the idea of shooting the film in Canada due to it having "... a great infrastructure for filmmaking, and Korean expatriates are involved in the film industry a lot." Bong wanted a film studio with a 75- to 100-meter-long space to fill with four train cars connected together. The production team travelled to Europe for studio scouting and ended up with two studio choices: Barrandov Studios in Czech Republic and Korda Studios in Hungary. In August 2011, a Czech producer hired by the production team began negotiations with two film studios for availability; Barrandov Studios was eventually chosen as the film studio and production service provider of Snowpiercer.

On 18 January 2012, Kelly Masterson was hired to rewrite the script before it went into production due to Bong seeing his screenplay work on Before the Devil Knows You're Dead and being impressed with the tonality of darkness and acuity in the story. Bong and Masterson had originally envisioned a romantic story for the protagonist; however they jettisoned that idea in subsequent drafts of the screenplay. On 8 October 2013, at the Busan International Film Festival, Bong acknowledged the challenges in adapting such a story to fit the apparent constraints of cinema, to which had to omit certain scenes from the graphic novel, "... I had to capture that long story in a two-hour film, so rather than cut out some scenes from the comic, I just rewrote the whole story to fit this time frame."

On 13 January 2012, Chris Evans began negotiations to star in the film adaptation, and was later confirmed as the film's male lead. On 17 January 2012, Tilda Swinton and Jamie Bell were confirmed to be in talks to join the project. Swinton first met Bong at the Cannes Film Festival, where she was of the mind that she did not want to make any other films, a decision she takes after each film: "And that one (and only) condition in which I will make another film is that I will have some fun. So we started to play with the idea of what would amuse us about this." Bong and Swinton experimented with voices, mannerisms and the general appearance of the character of Mason. On 18 January 2012, John Hurt was confirmed to have been cast, with Hurt stating, "All the film crew refer to [Bong], with great reverence, as 'Director Bong'. I love the fact that I am working for Director Bong." On 2 February 2012, Octavia Spencer had joined the cast of Bong's project in the role of a "passenger on the train who joins the revolt in order to save her son." Ed Harris spoke of his love of Bong Joon-ho's films and wanted to work with him, "I want to do this. I don't care what he's asking me to do because he's a really great filmmaker." On 27 February 2012, Ewen Bremner had joined the cast of Bong's film. On 3 April 2012, Luke Pasqualino was confirmed to have joined the cast.

Bong states that it took four years to develop the project, with an additional three to produce with Park. Stating, "Today, I feel I have overcome a terrible disease, like cancer cells had occupied my body during that time," as well as expressing an interest in making smaller films in the future. The film's production countries include the Czech Republic, France, South Korea, and the United States.

=== Filming ===
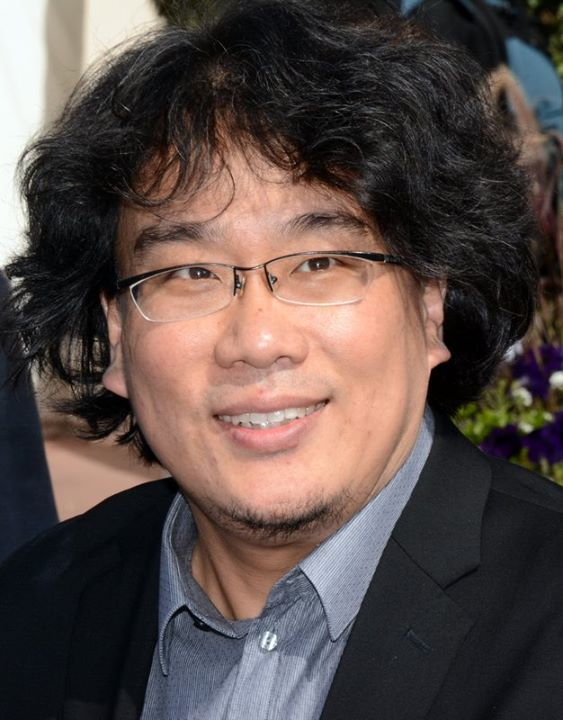
Director Bong Joon-ho promoting the film at the 2013 Deauville American Film Festival

In August 2011, the studio was determined as the shooting location, and in October 2011, Bong and his production team moved to the Czech Republic. During the period of November 2011 to April 2012, the key members of the crew were secured and confirmed, those being: Ondřej Nekvasil, Eric Durst, Julian Spencer and Marco Beltrami. The preparatory production began in Tyrol, Austria during mid-March for one day to shoot some snowy scenery on the Hintertux Glacier, which made for excellent conditions and perfect weather. On 3 April 2012, principal photography had officially begun in Prague, Czech Republic, at the Barrandov Studios on gimbals on its interconnected sound-stages after preparatory filming in the production occurred at the end of March, with a said budget near to $42 million, which was the largest film budget of all time for any film with Korean investors.

Bong filmed Snowpiercer with 35mm film in a 1.85:1 aspect ratio. Roughly ninety percent of the film was shot on set. Bong's original wish was to shoot the film entirely in Korea, but a studio large enough to accommodate a set of such scale was difficult to find, thus Barrandov Studio was used instead, requiring the construction of a 100-meter replica of the title train. In choosing Barrandov Studio, Bong explained, "All the artwork, huge train sets and the gimbal were greatly completed and fully operational. Shooting at Barrandov Studios will never stop with a perpetual engine." Bong's usage of the studio allowed him and his team to carry out meticulous experiments to contrive perpetual movement by staging the film on a giant gyroscopic gimbal, which can roll from side to side or bend realistically, to give three-dimensional feel to the train. Nearly all the shots within the train are filmed so that the tail sections are left of the characters on-screen, and the engine to the right; this was a "discipline" that Bong wanted to "maintain that energy, and give the audience a sense that whichever way the shot is moving, that's where the characters are going".

Flash SFX, the team involved in the construction of the gimbal stated, "The main challenge of physical effects work was that of inventing and developing a system that would perfectly simulate movements of train in motion. We managed to create a massive gimbal system supporting train cars with a total weight close to 100 tons. It was capable of simulating all sideway motions and vibrations of the train, including perfect make-believe curves of railroad tracks."

On 14 July 2012, principal photography officially wrapped in the Barrandov Studios after a 72-day shoot, with post-production carried out in South Korea, and Bong started editing the film for its release.

=== Visual effects ===
The visual effects company Scanline VFX worked on Snowpiercer. The company worked primarily on the exterior shots of the film: the frozen city, the Yekaterina Bridge, the Frozen Harbour landscape in the sushi lounge, the "Frozen Seven" sequence, the industrial park in the shoot-out sequence, and the avalanche and post crash environment at the end of the film. Already having multiple designs, storyboards and basic concepts of the train cars, it set in motion the development of over 60 different versions of the various wagons for the train Snowpiercer. Thus, visual effects supervisor Michel Mielke said "... we [had] a good idea of the vision of director Bong, we saw what he liked, and what did not work for the movie."

Visual effects designer Eric Durst spoke of the Aquarium Car being an intriguing challenge of lighting, with the differentiation of a water-based environment on one side and a frozen-based landscape at the other. Durst and his team, including director of photography Alex Hong, had light "travel through water trays on top of the aquarium structure." Durst added that "These refracted the light spilling on the actors, replicating the way light would react in an actual aquarium environment." In the task of creating that world, Mark Breakspear and his team in Vancouver spent a great amount of time at the Vancouver Aquarium to study "the fish, the lighting environments, the way the light refracted through the water and glass, along with how it distorted the fish as they passed."

Among the most challenging effects on the train was the length of the train and the number of cars that needed to be handled. Mielke had a "very complex rig" created and built to provide the animators involved in the creating process with enough capability as was possible. He stated, "The rig managed that the train automatically followed the rails, that the motion of the wagons where simulated depending on the rails, that the wagons could be changed easily and so on."

Parallel to principal photography in Prague, the first designs of visuals spanned from May 2012 up until the final shots of early March 2013, with a team of over 70 artists developing over 186 VFX-shots with almost 50 being full of computer-generated imagery.

=== Design ===
==== Costume design ====
Costume designer Catherine George explained that Mason was initially inspired by a Smithsonian photograph that production designer Ondřej Nekvasil had found of an older lady amongst a room full of dead birds at the Museum of Natural History, who was a real person from Swinton's childhood. In designing Mason's costume, George found images of women from their late sixties and early seventies, adding that, "... a certain type that I remembered growing up who would wear their fur to go into town and scoff at people who were less better off, a bit of a Margaret Thatcher type, really." George also designed Minister Mason's suit to look "a typical conservative politician shape and style" with the purple adding a royal quality to the attire. She had "collected pictures of dictators wearing elaborate uniforms and crazy hand-made medals" to experiment with the designs of such a character. George later admitted to the similarities to Ayn Rand, although not intentional. George and Bong travelled to Swinton's home in Scotland with "a couple of suitcases of clothes, wigs, glasses and teeth" and played with costuming ideas for Swinton's Minister Mason character.

On creating individuality for the passengers in the tail section, George had the designs come from random materials they would use to fashion practical clothing, "The tail section clothing was pieced together from different garments and repairs were made on top of that. They had to improvise with any materials that were left on the train." For the design of Curtis, Bong and George wanted him to be anonymous but at the same time recognizable. The design was difficult as George had to conceal Evans's muscular physique and muscle mass thus, "We had to cut out the sleeves of his under layers to help him look leaner."

George personally designed the costumes for Nam and Yona, who wear the "darker-coloured intense black". Taking inspiration from photographs of train engineers from an early industrial period and vintage French railway jackets, it was designed while she looked at utilitarian clothes due to Nam previously being a train engineer before his imprisonment. George also designed many of the tail section costumes, including Nam's, using Japanese Boro fabric.

In creating Claude's yellow coat and dress, George was mindful of the fact it was the first colour of brightness in the tail section scene, as well as the property of yellow being the most luminous colour in the spectrum. She expressed, "It's the colour that captures our attention more than any other and in colour psychology yellow is non-emotional and lacking compassion." Camera testing occurred before deciding the final colours as well as observing how they'd interact, with the back drop of darker costume colours.

==== Production design ====
Bong and his illustrators created various pieces of concept art for the train cars of Snowpiercer, led by Czech production designer Ondřej Nekvasil, who was brought onto the production team to help realize those visions. Nekvasil approached the atmosphere of the tail section it as if it were a "dark, monochromatic ... life", emphasising poor living arrangements, to which he found inspiration from poor areas of Hong Kong and elsewhere to put in the set designs. In order to make the colours appear "used" and "dirty", Nekvasil and company started with colourful props that were subsequently washed out and forcibly aged to create a feeling of "really used property and space", while creating a back story to justify the appearance.

When designing the train, Nekvasil and Bong hit upon the idea of the train not being designed by one man in one specific moment; the idea that "these various train cars were built in different periods of Wilford's life". Another idea was the logical scale of the train itself, though Bong entertained the notion of it being beyond a logical scale, Nekvasil stated, " ... if it's 20 feet [6 m] wide, it'll no longer seem like a train." Dimensions and sizes were discussed, and the design sized finalised was "slightly bigger than a typical train", though enough to allow space for camera movement inside the train. The design was difficult due to distance limitations, as Nekvasil said, "... the biggest stage we had, which was about 300 feet [90 m] long, was not big enough to fit everything."

Instead of overly relying on CGI, Nekvasil's production design team constructed twenty-six individual train cars and used a giant gyroscopic gimbal in Prague's Barrandov Studios to simulate the movement of an actual train when shooting. Bong stated that the gimbal was used on the third day of shooting, explaining, "Sometimes we felt carsick on set," due to the realistic effects of the gimbal.

==== Sound design ====
Sound engineers Anna Behlmer, Terry Porter and Mark Holding mixed the sound for Snowpiercer, supervised by sound editor Taeyoung Choi.

=== Music and soundtrack ===
In May 2012, Marco Beltrami was hired to compose the incidental music for Snowpiercer. In January 2013, a song titled Yona Lights was released on the film's official website in South Korea. In July 2013, during the 007 Fimucité at Tenerife International Film Music Festival in the Canary Islands, a few pieces of the three films composed by Beltrami (Snowpiercer, Soul Surfer and The Wolverine) were selected for the performance.

The film's official soundtrack was released in August 2013 in South Korea and the international release date was on 9 September 2013.

== Release ==
Snowpiercer premiered at the Times Square on 29 July 2013 in Seoul, South Korea, before screening at the Deauville American Film Festival as the closing film on 7 September 2013, the Berlin International Film Festival as the part of Berlin's Forum sidebar on 7 February 2014, opening the Los Angeles Film Festival on 11 June 2014, and the Edinburgh International Film Festival on 22 June 2014.

=== Cutting request ===
On 9 November 2012, The Weinstein Company acquired the distribution rights to Snowpiercer from CJ Entertainment based on the script and some completed footage, with a plan for wide release in North America, as well as throughout the United Kingdom, Australia, New Zealand and South Africa. It was released in the United States on 27 June 2014 in just eight theaters in selected cities. This delay was caused by Harvey Weinstein, an owner of The Weinstein Company, requesting 25 minutes of footage be cut, asking for less dialogue and more action, and a voice-over sequence at the end of the film. The fish-gutting scene was one that Weinstein was adamant about removing, but Bong lied to Weinstein, claiming his father was a fisherman and the scene was in tribute to his father, to get Weinstein to agree to keep it. Weinstein screened his cut to a test audience of around 250 members. In response to the poor score given by the test audience, Weinstein said to Bong they needed to cut more. In a later test screening of Bong's original cut of the film, the audience's score was "much higher". Following the news of the cut, a Free Snowpiercer petition campaign demanding the director's cut of the film to be released in the US was created by cinema activist Denise Heard-Bashur, with support from the film's stars Tilda Swinton and John Hurt. Bong's uncut version of the film was eventually released, but with the caveat that the film switched distributors to Radius-TWC, resulting in a limited release in art house cinemas. On 3 July 2014, it was announced that thanks to positive reviews, Snowpiercer would get a wider US release and play in over 150 theaters.

=== Home media ===
The film was released on DVD and Blu-ray in various countries, including France and Korea, over Q3 and Q4 first, before the movie was finally debuted in North American theaters. The film was eventually released on home media in North America by Starz's Anchor Bay Entertainment through The Weinstein Company Home Entertainment on 21 October 2014, and became available on Netflix for streaming on 1 November 2014. It did not get a genuine UK release until November 2018, when it was made available digitally via Amazon Prime Video and was released on DVD & Blu-ray in 2020. A 4K restoration of the film was released on Blu-ray and digitally on January 14, 2025, by Lionsgate.

== Reception ==
=== Box office ===
Between its South Korean opening on 27 June 2014 and 23 October 2014, the film earned US$86.7 million worldwide. As of April 2014, it was the tenth highest-grossing domestic film in South Korea with 9.35 million admissions. The film holds the domestic record for the fastest movie (domestic and foreign) to reach four million admissions, which it achieved in its fifth day after premiere, and another record for the highest weekend figure (from Friday to Sunday) for a Korean film, with 2.26 million viewers. The film took in $171,000 on its US opening weekend, averaging around $21,400 per theater. The film grossed US$59.8 million in South Korea and its largest international market was China, with $11.1 million.

=== Critical response ===
Film review aggregation website Rotten Tomatoes reports that 94% of critics gave the film a positive rating, based on 267 reviews with an average score of 8.1/10. The website's critical consensus states, "Snowpiercer offers an audaciously ambitious action spectacle for filmgoers numb to effects-driven blockbusters." Metacritic assigned the film a weighted average score of 84 out of 100, based on 38 reviews from mainstream critics, considered to be "universal acclaim".

Chris Nashawaty of Entertainment Weekly gave the piece an "A" rating, stating, "Snowpiercer sucks you into its strange, brave new world so completely, it leaves you with the all-too-rare sensation that you've just witnessed something you've never seen before ... and need to see again."

A. O. Scott wrote, in his review for The New York Times, "Planetary destruction and human extinction happen a half-dozen times every summer. It's rarely this refreshing, though." Andrew Pulver of The Guardian scored the film most positively, writing, "Snowpiercer works brilliantly, the sum of extremely disparate parts that adds up to cinematic excellence." Joshua Rothkopf of Time Out New York scored the film five out of five stars, writing, "Sprung from a 1982 French graphic novel and bearing its era's trickle-down tensions, Snowpiercer is a headlong rush into conceptual lunacy—but you'll love it anyway." Rothkopf praises Joon-ho, stating, "... Bong grabs onto the grungy conventions of postapocalyptic adventure with relish. He serves up claustrophobic action scenes (one largely shot in the dark) and ominous, messianic overtones as the band of rebels makes its way forward."

Lou Lumenick of The New York Post gave the film high acclaim, writing, "Don't miss it—this is enormously fun visionary filmmaking, with a witty script and a great international cast." He added, "The beautifully designed train is one of the most memorable in screen history ..." David Denby of The New Yorker spoke highly of the piece, stating it to be, "Violent, often absurd, but full of brilliant surprises, while Bong keeps the center of the action moving toward the front of the train, a considerable feat of camera placement, choreographed mayhem, and cohesive editing", and praising Nekvasil's production design, "Bong and [Nekvasil], provide them with a series of sybaritic astonishments."

Clarence Tsui of The Hollywood Reporter wrote a highly positive review, commenting, "Snowpiercer is still an intellectually and artistically superior vehicle to many of the end-of-days futuristic action thrillers out there." Speaking highly of Bong's film-making, Tsui wrote, "Bong's vivid depictions—aided by Ondřej Nekvasil's production design, Hong Kyung-pyo's cinematography and Steve M. Choe's editing—are exceptional." David Thomson of The New Republic remarked that "The most bracing and liberating thing about Joon-ho Bong's Snowpiercer is not just its lyrical forward motion, but the exuberance with which the film revels in its plot predicament." He furthers praises Nekvasil's "progression of design set-pieces" and Tilda Swinton's performance, saying "She is the life and soul of this riotous party, and you will be sad to see her disposed of, no matter that Mason's ghastly manner has earned it." Scott Foundas of Variety wrote, "An enormously ambitious, visually stunning and richly satisfying futuristic epic from the gifted Korean genre director Bong Joon-ho." Foundas added that Beltrami's original score was "among the generally impeccable craft contributions [to the film]".

James Rocchi of Film.com wrote that, "If the film has one element that never flags or falters, it's Evans."

Some were more critical of the film. Jordan Adler of We've Got This Covered wrote "We leave Snowpiercer more exhausted with questions than invigorated by its unique vision and style. It is a formidable example of directorial control bogged down by poor writing, half-finished effects work and a rather thin exploration of a fascinating dystopian universe." Ann Hornaday of The Washington Post found otherwise potentially good acting to be "virtually lost in a tonal mishmash that can never decide between thoughtful political metaphor, lightheartedness and pulverizing violence" and went on to describe the director's "tiresome, slow-motion fetishism, mixing costumes and weaponry in an effort to distract from the scenes' sheer repetitiveness."

=== Critics' top ten lists ===
In 2020, Snowpiercer was ranked by The Guardian number 8 among the classics of modern South Korean Cinema. The film appeared on several critics' lists of the top ten best films of 2014.

== Accolades ==
Awards and nominations
Award	Date of ceremony	Category	Recipients	Result
Alliance of Women Film Journalists	12 January 2015	Best Supporting Actress	Tilda Swinton	Won
Asia-Pacific Film Festival	13 December 2013	Best Director	Bong Joon-ho	Won
Asia-Pacific Film Festival	13 December 2013	Best Supporting Actor	Song Kang-ho	Nominated
Asia-Pacific Film Festival	13 December 2013	Best Supporting Actress	Tilda Swinton	Nominated
Asia-Pacific Film Festival	13 December 2013	Best Cinematography	Hong Kyung-pyo	Nominated
Asia-Pacific Film Festival	13 December 2013	Best Editing	Steve M. Choe, Changju Kim	Nominated
Asia-Pacific Film Festival	13 December 2013	Best Production Design	Ondřej Nekvasil	Nominated
Asia-Pacific Film Festival	13 December 2013	Best Sound Design	Choi Tae-young	Nominated
Asian Film Awards	27 March 2014	Best Film	Park Chan-wook, Lee Tae-hun, Jeong Tae-sung, Steven Nam	Nominated
Asian Film Awards	27 March 2014	Best Director	Bong Joon-ho	Nominated
Asian Film Awards	27 March 2014	Best Screenwriter	Bong Joon-ho, Kelly Masterson	Nominated
Asian Film Awards	27 March 2014	Best Production Design	Ondřej Nekvasil	Nominated
Asian Film Awards	27 March 2014	Best Costume Designer	Catherine George	Nominated
Austin Film Critics Association Awards	17 December 2014	Top 10 Films		Runner-up
Baeksang Arts Awards	27 May 2014	Best Film		Nominated
Baeksang Arts Awards	27 May 2014	Best Director	Bong Joon-ho	Won
Baeksang Arts Awards	27 May 2014	Best Supporting Actress	Go Ah-sung	Nominated
Baeksang Arts Awards	27 May 2014	Most Popular Actress	Go Ah-sung	Nominated
Black Reel Awards	22 February 2015	Outstanding Supporting Actress	Octavia Spencer	Nominated
Blue Dragon Film Awards	22 November 2013	Best Film		Nominated
Blue Dragon Film Awards	22 November 2013	Best Director	Bong Joon-ho	Won
Blue Dragon Film Awards	22 November 2013	Best Supporting Actress	Go Ah-sung	Nominated
Blue Dragon Film Awards	22 November 2013	Best Cinematography	Kyung-pyo Hong	Nominated
Blue Dragon Film Awards	22 November 2013	Best Production Design	Ondřej Nekvasil	Won
Blue Dragon Film Awards	22 November 2013	Best Technical Aspect (Editing)	Steve M. Choe, Changju Kim	Nominated
Blue Dragon Film Awards	22 November 2013	Best Technical Aspect (Special Effects)	Eric Durst	Nominated
Boston Online Film Critics Association	6 December 2014	Best Picture		Won
Boston Online Film Critics Association	6 December 2014	Top 10 Films		Won
Boston Online Film Critics Association	6 December 2014	Best Supporting Actress	Tilda Swinton	Won
Busan Film Critics Awards	1 November 2013	Best Screenplay	Bong Joon-ho, Kelly Masterson	Won
Central Ohio Film Critics Association	8 January 2015	Best Film		Runner-up
Central Ohio Film Critics Association	8 January 2015	Best Screenplay	Bong Joon-ho, Kelly Masterson	Runner-up
Central Ohio Film Critics Association	8 January 2015	Best Supporting Actress	Tilda Swinton	Won
Central Ohio Film Critics Association	8 January 2015	Actor of the Year	Tilda Swinton (also for The Grand Budapest Hotel, Only Lovers Left Alive, and The Zero Theorem)	Runner-up
Chicago Film Critics Association	15 December 2014	Best Art Direction	Ondřej Nekvasil	Nominated
Critics' Choice Movie Awards	15 January 2015	Best Sci-Fi/Horror Movie		Nominated
Critics' Choice Movie Awards	15 January 2015	Best Supporting Actress	Tilda Swinton	Nominated
Critics' Choice Movie Awards	15 January 2015	Best Art Direction	Ondřej Nekvasil, Beatrice Brentnerova	Nominated
Detroit Film Critics Society	19 December 2014	Best Supporting Actress	Tilda Swinton	Nominated
Director's Cut Awards	15 August 2014	Best Director	Bong Joon-ho	Won
Gay and Lesbian Entertainment Critics Association	1 March 2015	Unsung Film of the Year		Nominated
Gay and Lesbian Entertainment Critics Association	1 March 2015	Visually Striking Film of the Year		Nominated
Georgia Film Critics Association	9 January 2015	Best Picture		Nominated
Georgia Film Critics Association	9 January 2015	Best Supporting Actress	Tilda Swinton	Won
Georgia Film Critics Association	9 January 2015	Best Adapted Screenplay	Bong Joon-ho, Kelly Masterson, Jacques Lob, Benjamin Legrand, Jean-Marc Rochette	Nominated
Georgia Film Critics Association	9 January 2015	Best Production Design	Ondřej Nekvasil, Catherine George	Nominated
Golden Tomato Awards	6 January 2015	Best Limited Release Film		Runner-up
Golden Tomato Awards	6 January 2015	Best Comic Book/Graphic Novel Film		Won
Gotham Awards	1 December 2014	Tribute Award	Tilda Swinton (also for Only Lovers Left Alive, and The Grand Budapest Hotel)	Won
Grand Bell Awards	1 November 2013	Best Film		Nominated
Grand Bell Awards	1 November 2013	Best Director	Bong Joon-ho	Nominated
Grand Bell Awards	1 November 2013	Best Screenplay	Bong Joon-ho, Kelly Masterson	Nominated
Grand Bell Awards	1 November 2013	Best Supporting Actress	Go Ah-sung	Nominated
Grand Bell Awards	1 November 2013	Best Cinematography	Hong Kyung-pyo	Nominated
Grand Bell Awards	1 November 2013	Best Editing	Steve M. Choe, Changju Kim	Won
Grand Bell Awards	1 November 2013	Best Art Direction	Ondřej Nekvasil	Won
Iowa Film Critics	6 January 2015	Best Supporting Actress	Tilda Swinton	Runner-up
Houston Film Critics Society	23 December 2014	Best Supporting Actress	Tilda Swinton	Nominated
International Cinephile Society Awards	23 February 2014	Best Picture Not Released In 2013		Won
International Cinephile Society Awards	20 February 2015	Best Supporting Actress	Tilda Swinton	Runner-up
International Cinephile Society Awards	20 February 2015	Best Adapted Screenplay	Bong Joon-ho, Kelly Masterson	Nominated
International Cinephile Society Awards	20 February 2015	Best Production Design	Ondřej Nekvasil	Nominated
Las Vegas Film Critics Society Awards	18 December 2014	Top 10 Films		Won
Las Vegas Film Critics Society Awards	18 December 2014	Best Supporting Actress	Tilda Swinton	Won
Los Angeles Film Critics Association	7 December 2014	Best Production Design	Ondřej Nekvasil	Runner-up
National Board of Review Awards	6 January 2015	Top 10 Independent Films		Won
North Carolina Film Critics Association	5 January 2015	Best Supporting Actress	Tilda Swinton	Nominated
North Carolina Film Critics Association	5 January 2015	Best Adapted Screenplay	Bong Joon-ho, Kelly Masterson	Nominated
Online Film Critics Society	15 December 2014	Best Supporting Actress	Tilda Swinton	Nominated
Online Film Critics Society	15 December 2014	Best Adapted Screenplay	Bong Joon-ho, Kelly Masterson	Nominated
Online Film & Television Association	8 February 2015	Best Supporting Actress	Tilda Swinton	Nominated
Online Film & Television Association	8 February 2015	Best Adapted Screenplay	Bong Joon-ho, Kelly Masterson	Nominated
Online Film & Television Association	8 February 2015	Best Production Design	Ondřej Nekvasil	Nominated
Phoenix Film Critics Society	16 December 2014	Overlooked Film of the Year		Nominated
Phoenix Film Critics Society	16 December 2014	Best Production Design	Ondřej Nekvasil	Nominated
San Francisco Film Critics Circle	14 December 2014	Best Supporting Actress	Tilda Swinton	Nominated
San Francisco Film Critics Circle	14 December 2014	Best Adapted Screenplay	Bong Joon-ho, Kelly Masterson	Nominated
San Francisco Film Critics Circle	14 December 2014	Best Production Design	Ondřej Nekvasil	Nominated
Satellite Awards	15 February 2015	Best Actress in a Supporting Role	Tilda Swinton	Nominated
Satellite Awards	15 February 2015	Best Sound	Anna Behlmer, Mark Holding, Taeyoung Choi, Terry Porter	Nominated
Satellite Awards	15 February 2015	Best Visual Effects	Eric Durst	Nominated
Saturn Awards	25 June 2015	Best Action or Adventure Film		Nominated
Southeastern Film Critics Association	23 December 2014	Top 10 Films		Won
Southeastern Film Critics Association	23 December 2014	Best Supporting Actress	Tilda Swinton	Runner-up
St. Louis Gateway Film Critics Association	15 December 2014	Best Art Direction	Ondřej Nekvasil	Nominated
Toronto Film Critics Association	16 December 2014	Best Supporting Actress	Tilda Swinton	Runner-up
South Korean Film Critics Awards	18 November 2013	Best Film		Won
South Korean Film Critics Awards	18 November 2013	Best Director	Bong Joon-ho	Won
South Korean Film Critics Awards	18 November 2013	Best Cinematography	Hong Kyung-pyo	Won
Sydney Film Festival	15 June 2014	Best Film		Nominated
Utah Film Critics Association	17 December 2014	Best Supporting Actress	Tilda Swinton	Runner-up
Utah Film Critics Association	17 December 2014	Best Adapted Screenplay	Bong Joon-ho, Kelly Masterson (tied with Paul Thomas Anderson for Inherent Vice)	Won
Washington D.C. Area Film Critics Association Awards	8 December 2014	Best Supporting Actress	Tilda Swinton	Nominated
Washington D.C. Area Film Critics Association Awards	8 December 2014	Best Art Direction	Ondřej Nekvasil, Beatrice Brentnerova	Nominated
World Soundtrack Awards	25 October 2014	Film Composer of the Year	Marco Beltrami	Nominated
Village Voice Film Poll	8 February 2015	Best Supporting Actress	Tilda Swinton	Runner-up

== Television series ==
The film, along with the original French graphic novel, was adapted into an American television show by Tomorrow Studios, and premiered on TNT on May 17, 2020, in the United States. The show stars Jennifer Connelly and Daveed Diggs, among others, and takes place in a rebooted narrative of the film, with events on the train starting about seven years after the global catastrophe.

== See also ==
- The Day After Tomorrow
- Soylent Green
- Post Impact
- Decision 3012
