= Amanda Terry =

Canadian make-up artist

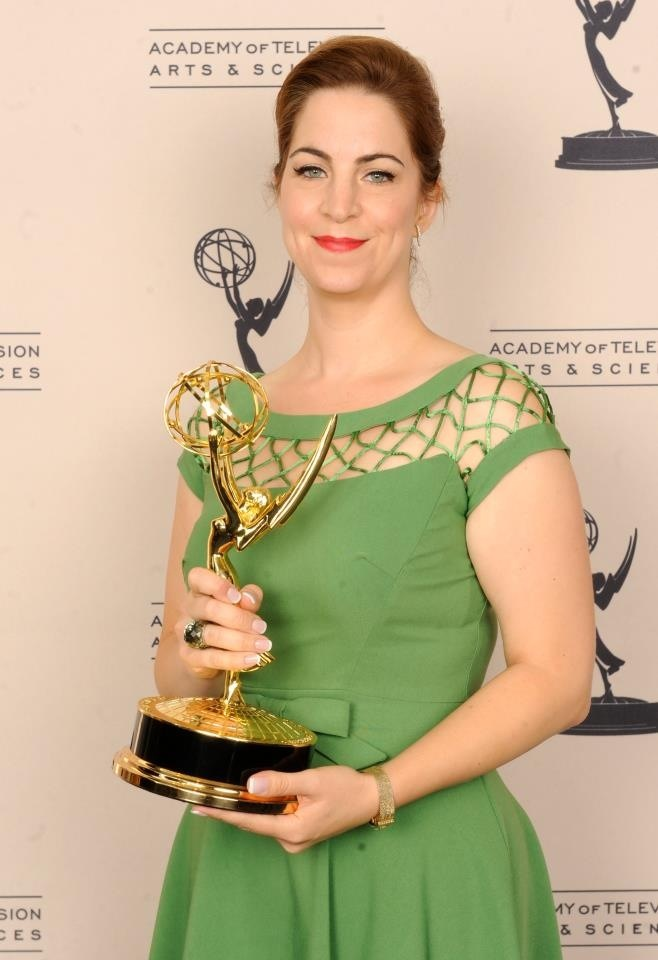
- Amanda Terry at the 63rd Primetime Creative Arts Emmy Awards
- Born: March 7, 1975 (age 51)
- Occupation: Makeup artist
- Years active: 1997–present

Amanda Terry (born March 7, 1975) is a Canadian makeup artist. Most notable is her work on The Kennedys for which she won an Emmy, and also her work on Beauty & the Beast and Doc. She is married to screenwriter Brandon Tataryn, and together the couple have two children.
