= Kelly Masterson =

American dramatist

- Born: United States
- Education: University of California, Davis
- Occupations: Screenwriter, playwright
- Notable work: Before the Devil Knows You're Dead

Kelly Masterson is an American playwright and screenwriter who lives in New York City.

He is known for writing the screenplay for the 2007 film Before the Devil Knows You're Dead.

== Education and career ==
Before moving to New York City to stage several of his early plays, he studied theology at the University of California, Davis.

In describing the script for Before the Devil Knows You're Dead, he has said:

"I don't know. It was winter, and I was depressed I guess when I was writing it. I'm fascinated by the folly of human nature. I love characters who we understand and sympathize with, but we just shake our heads at how stupidly they act. This probably comes from my theology background but I love the big themes of good and evil and how we're such a combination of both. We try to chart a path that's on the side of good, but we all have evil impulses in us."

Subsequent to his success with Before the Devil Knows You're Dead, he has worked in several media including stage plays, film and television. Masterson's play Edith, about Woodrow and Edith Wilson, premiered at the Berkshire Theatre Festival in 2012.

Masterson wrote the teleplay for the television movie, Killing Kennedy, which aired in November 2013 on the National Geographic Channel.

Cowriting with Bong Joon-ho, Masterson adapted the French climate fiction graphic novel Le Transperceneige by Jacques Lob, Benjamin Legrand, and Jean-Marc Rochette into the film Snowpiercer, which was also released in 2013.

== Filmography ==
- Before the Devil Knows You're Dead (2007)
- Snowpiercer (2013)
- Killing Kennedy (2013)
- Good People (2014)
