= Good People (2014 film) =

- Theatrical release poster
- Directed by: Henrik Ruben Genz
- Screenplay by: Kelly Masterson
- Based on: Good People by Marcus Sakey
- Produced by: Avi Lerner; Benjamin Forkner; Ed Cathell III; Eric Kranzler; Tobey Maguire
- Starring: James Franco; Kate Hudson; Omar Sy; Tom Wilkinson; Anna Friel; Sam Spruell
- Cinematography: Jørgen Johansson
- Edited by: Paul Tothill
- Music by: Neil Davidge
- Production companies: Film 360; Maguire Entertainment; Material Pictures
- Distributed by: Millennium Films
- Release date: September 26, 2014 (United States)
- Running time: 90 minutes
- Countries: United States; United Kingdom; Sweden; Denmark
- Language: English
- Box office: $988,434 (Theatrical Performance); $67,904 (Home Market Performance); $1,056,338 (Total)

Good People (released in some countries as Getaway 2) is a 2014 American action thriller film directed by Henrik Ruben Genz and written by Kelly Masterson, based on Marcus Sakey's 2008 novel of same name. The film stars James Franco, Kate Hudson, Omar Sy, Tom Wilkinson, and Sam Spruell and tells the story of an American couple, Tom and Anna Wright, living in London who fall into severe debt while renovating their family's home. The film was released in select theaters and on demand on 26 September 2014.

== Plot ==
The story begins with four men pulling a heist together. The men rob a man named Khan, a well-known French heroin dealer, of his drugs and money. Ben Tuttle and Bobby emerge from the building first. Ben shoots Bobby and runs off with all of the money and drugs. The two other men, Jack Witkowski and Marshall, exit later. They find Bobby dead, and run off before they get caught.

Londoners Tom Wright and his wife, Anna have fallen into debt while renovating their home. They have been trying unsuccessfully to have a baby. After their downstairs tenant, Ben, does not respond to their requests to keep the noise down, they discover him dead. The cause of death is ruled a heroin overdose. While cleaning the apartment, they find £220,000 above a loose ceiling tile. They debate what to do with the money as well as the remainder of Ben's things. After some time, Tom uses some of the money paying off the house, and Anna spends some on fertility treatment. Meanwhile, Detective Halden suspects that the Wrights are withholding information. He begins tracking their movements, as he seems to believe Ben's death is connected to his daughter's.

A man is shown being threatened by Jack Witkowski to reveal the location of his cousin, Ben. As soon as he reveals this, he is killed. Witkowski and his partner, Marshall, break into Ben's old apartment to look for the money, but are unsuccessful. Khan approaches Tom Wright about his money, claiming that Tom must choose a side, his or Jack Witkowski's. Tom refuses to choose a side and when he arrives home, Witkowski is waiting for him. Witkowski tortures Tom, but Tom refuses to give up the location of the money. Detective Halden arrives, and Witkowski and his partner run off. Halden tells the Wrights he wants to use them as bait, off the books, to arrest Witkowski, as Witkowski has inside connections with law enforcement.

The Wrights schedule a money drop with Witkowski, and then meet with Detective Halden and Khan separately to devise a plan. During the drop, Witkowski realises Halden is a cop, and Marshall shoots Halden. The Wrights run off with the money and Khan tells them they are on their own, as he believes he has been played. Halden is shown recovering in the hospital, as he was wearing a bulletproof vest.

Witkowski and his men take Anna's friend, Sarah, and her baby, Julian, hostage. The Wrights agree to meet Witkowski at the house the Wrights were renovating, where they've been hiding. The Wrights inform Halden of the plan and rig the house in preparation for their meeting. Witkowski falls through the floor, and Tom puts nails through Marshall's feet. Khan and his men arrive at the house, to the surprise of everyone. Halden arrives at the house and kills one of Khan's men with his car as Sarah and her baby escape, but Halden is knocked unconscious. A game of cat and mouse ensues throughout the house between Khan and his men, Witkowski and Marshall, and the Wrights. Khan's other man is killed by Tom, and Khan kills Witkowski. Tom fights with Khan, who is about to kill Tom when a shot from Marshall, directed at them both, kills Khan. Anna is nearly choked to death by Marshall until a revived Halden enters the house and shoots Marshall dead. The movie ends with the house burning to the ground, the Wrights moving out of their apartment, and Anna telling Tom that she is pregnant.

== Cast ==
- James Franco as Tom Wright
- Kate Hudson as Anna Wright
- Omar Sy as Khan, a French heroin dealer
- Tom Wilkinson as D.I. John Halden
- Anna Friel as Sarah, Anna's friend
- Sam Spruell as Jack Witkowski
- Diarmaid Murtagh as Marshall, Jack's accomplice
- Michael Jibson as Mike Calloway, Tom's boss
- Diana Hardcastle as Marie Halden, Detective Halden's wife
- Oliver Dimsdale as Supt Ray Martin
- Maarten Dannenberg as Andre

== Production ==
Principal photography began on June 1, 2013, at Shepperton Studios and also filmed in London.

== Reception ==
Good People holds a 12% rating on Rotten Tomatoes based on 33 reviews, with an average rating of 4.35/10. On Metacritic, the film has a score of 42 out of 100, based on 11 critics, indicating "mixed or average" reviews. The Hollywood Reporter said about the film that "This is why bad things happen", while Guy Lodge of the Variety Magazine criticized James Franco and Kate Hudson for their roles, saying that "[they] are uncharacteristically muted in this watchable but wholly unsurprising London crime caper". David Hughes of Empire, gave Good People 2 out of 5 and saying in his closing comments "Tom and Anna are so thinly sketched that by the time the painfully slow set-up starts to pay off, we no longer care who does what to whom, or why".
