= Resnick (TV series) =

- Genre: Crime drama
- Created by: John Harvey
- Written by: John Harvey
- Directed by: Bruce MacDonald; Peter Smith
- Starring: Tom Wilkinson; Paul Bazely; Kate Eaton; William Ivory; Paul Jesson; David Neilson; Daniel Ryan; Del Henney
- Composer: Bill Connor
- Country of origin: United Kingdom
- Original language: English
- No. of series: 2
- No. of episodes: 5

Production
- Executive producer: Colin Rogers
- Producer: Kevan Van Thompson
- Cinematography: Graham Frake
- Running time: 50 minutes
- Production company: BBC Productions

Original release
- Network: BBC1
- Release: 31 March 1992 – 25 July 1993

Resnick is a British television crime drama series, first broadcast on 31 March 1992, that ran for two series on BBC1. The series, based on the Charlie Resnick novels by author John Harvey, starred Academy Award-nominee Tom Wilkinson as the title character, alongside Paul Bazely, Paul Jesson, David Neilson and Daniel Ryan. The first series, an adaptation of the novel Lonely Hearts, was adapted for television by Harvey himself. Bruce MacDonald was assigned to direct.

A second series followed in 1993, slightly shorter in length than the first. The series adapted the novel Rough Treatment; again the teleplay was penned by Harvey, with Peter Smith assigned to direct. No further adaptations were created by the BBC, despite three other Resnick novels having been printed by the time of broadcast. In 2016, the series was listed for release on DVD by BBC America in the United States; a two-disc set containing both series. However, no date has yet been set for the release; despite a cover-art image being published shortly after the listing went live.

== Cast ==
- Tom Wilkinson as DI Charlie Resnick
- Paul Bazely as DC Dipak Patel
- Kate Eaton as DC Lynn Kellogg
- William Ivory as DC Mark Devine
- Paul Jesson as Supt. Jack Skelton
- David Neilson as DS Graham Millington
- Daniel Ryan as DC Kevin Nichols
- Del Henney as DI Reg Cossall
- Graham Seed as DI Michael Grafton (Series 1)
- Chris Brailsford as DCI Tom Parker (Series 1)
- Edward Clayton as DI Jeff Harrison (Series 2)
- Mark Spalding as DI Norman Mann (Series 2)

== Episodes ==
=== Series 1 (1992) ===
No.	Title	Directed by	Written by	British air date
1	"Lonely Hearts: Part 1"	Bruce MacDonald	John Harvey	31 March 1992
Sustained by elaborate sandwiches and jazz, DI Charlie Resnick tackles crime on the streets of Nottingham with a unique blend of dedication, intuition and humour. But his skills are tested by a domestic murder case which has a devastating effect on his already troubled personal life.
2	"Lonely Hearts: Part 2"	Bruce MacDonald	John Harvey	7 April 1992
A second woman has been murdered, and Resnick believes that the link between them is the personal column of the local newspaper. Did Shirley Peters and Mary Barnett lose their lives while looking for love?
3	"Lonely Hearts: Part 3"	Bruce MacDonald	John Harvey	14 April 1992
Resnick may have found love, but he hasn't found the Lonely Hearts Killer. While others pursue conventional police methods, Resnick's intuition brings him closer to the truth – and close to the murderer in person.

=== Series 2 (1993) ===
No.	Title	Directed by	Written by	British air date
1	"Rough Treatment: Part 1"	Peter Smith	John Harvey	18 July 1993
The unorthodox detective with a taste for exotic sandwiches and jazz meets his match in the shape of two equally unorthodox burglars who find more than they bargained for in an apparently deserted home.
2	"Rough Treatment: Part 2"	Peter Smith	John Harvey	25 July 1993
Resnick continues his hunt for the two unorthodox burglars, Grice and Grabianski. Grice's interest in getting rid of the cocaine stolen from TV director Harold Roy is matched only by Grabianski's interest in retaining the affections of Roy's wife.
