= John Harvey (author) =

British author of crime fiction

- Born: 1938 (age 87–88); London
- Occupation: Author
- Writing career
- Years active: 1975–present
- Genre: Crime fiction
- Notable work: Charlie Resnick series

John Harvey is a British author of crime fiction, screenwriter, and poet. He is best known for his series of jazz-influenced Charlie Resnick novels, based in the City of Nottingham. He has also written under several pen names.

== Teaching career ==
Harvey moved to Nottingham in the 1960s in order to teach English and drama at Heanor Aldercar Secondary School in South East Derbyshire. Towards the end of the 1960s he left Nottingham to teach first in Andover, Hampshire, and then in Stevenage, Herts, returning to Nottingham to study for an MA in the Department of American Studies at the University of Nottingham.

== Writing career ==
Harvey has published over 100 books under various names, and has worked on scripts for TV and radio. He started writing in the 1970s when he produced a variety of pulp fiction including westerns. He also ran Slow Dancer Press from 1977 to 1999 publishing poetry. His own poetry has been published in a number of chapbooks and two collections, "Ghosts of a Chance" and "Bluer Than This", published by Smith/Doorstop. In 2014 Smith/Doorstop published a New & Selected Poems, "Out of Silence".

The first Resnick novel, Lonely Hearts, was published in 1989, and was named by The Times as one of the 100 Greatest Crime Novels of the Century. Harvey brought the series to an end in 2014 with Darkness, Darkness, which he dramatised for the stage and which was produced at Nottingham Playhouse in 2014.

The next series from Harvey was the Frank Elder series. The first novel in that series, Flesh and Blood, won Harvey the Crime Writers' Association Silver Dagger in 2004, an accolade some crime fiction critics thought long overdue. In 2007 he was awarded the Diamond Dagger for a Lifetime's Contribution to the genre.

== Recognition and honours ==
On 14 July 2009, Harvey received an honorary degree (Doctor of Letters) from the University of Nottingham in recognition of his literary eminence and his associations with both the university and Nottingham (particularly in the Charlie Resnick novels).

=== Awards and accolades ===
- 1989 - The Times' list of the Hundred Best Crime Novels of the Last Century for Lonely Hearts
- 1990 - CWA Gold Dagger for Fiction (shortlist): Rough Treatment
- 1992 - New York Festivals, Bronze medal, Screenplay for Best TV Drama Series: "Resnick: Lonely Hearts"
- 1995 - CWA Dagger in the Library
- 1997 - French CWA award for Best Foreign Novel (shortlist): Off Minor
- 1998 - Sherlock Award for Best British Detective, Charlie Resnick: Last Rites
- 1999 - Sony Radio Drama Silver Award for adaptation of Graham Greene's "The End of the Affair"
- 2000 - Grand Prix du Roman Noir Étranger:" Cold Light"
- 2004 - CWA Silver Dagger for Fiction: Flesh and Blood
- 2004 - Barry Award for Flesh and Blood
- 2007 - CWA Cartier Diamond Dagger award for a Lifetime's Achievement in the Field
- 2007 - Theakston's Old Peculier Crime Novel of the Year Award (longlist): Ash & Bone
- 2007 - Prix du Polar Europeen : "Ash & Bone"
- 2009 - Honorary Degree, Doctor of Letters: University of Nottingham
- 2013 - Honorary Degree, Doctor of Letters: University of Hertfordshire
- 2014 - CWA Short Story Dagger: "Fedora"

== Personal life and other activities ==
Harvey is a Notts County F.C. fan and honorary member of its supporters club.

In 2016 he became president of Bromley House Library. In 2014 he was living in London.

== Bibliography ==
=== Standalone novels ===
- Frame (1979)
- Blind (1981)
- Endgame (1982) (as James Mann)
- Dancer Draws a Wild Card (1985) (as Terry Lennox)
- In A True Light (2001)
- Gone to Ground (2007) Shortlisted for Theakston's Old Peculier Crime Novel of the Year Award 2009.
- Nick's Blues (2008 - novella)
- Far Cry (2009)
- A Darker Shade of Blue (2010) (a collection of short stories)
- Good Bait (2012)

=== Charlie Resnick series ===
1. Lonely Hearts (1989)
2. Rough Treatment (1990)
3. Cutting Edge (1991)
4. Off Minor (1992)
5. Wasted Years (1993)
6. Cold Light (1994)
7. Living Proof (1995)
8. Easy Meat (1996)
9. Still Water (1997)
10. Last Rites (1998)
11. Now's The Time: The Complete Resnick Short Stories (2006)
12. Trouble in Mind (novella also featuring Jack Kiley) (2007)
13. Cold in Hand (2008)
14. Darkness, Darkness (Resnick's last case) (2013)

=== Frank Elder ===
1. Flesh and Blood (2004)
2. Ash and Bone (2005)
3. Darkness and Light (2006)
4. Body and Soul (Frank Elder's last case) (19 April 2018)

=== Scott Mitchell ===
1. Amphetamine and Pearls (1976)
2. The Geranium Kiss
3. Junkyard Angel (1977)
4. Neon Madman

=== Short stories ===
- "The Sun, the Moon and the Stars" (2005), published in The Detection Collection, edited by Simon Brett.
