= Before the Devil Knows You're Dead =

2007 film by Sidney Lumet

- Theatrical release poster
- Directed by: Sidney Lumet
- Written by: Kelly Masterson
- Produced by: Paul Parmar; Michael Cerenzie; Brian Linse; William S. Gilmore
- Starring: Philip Seymour Hoffman; Ethan Hawke; Marisa Tomei; Albert Finney
- Cinematography: Ron Fortunato
- Edited by: Tom Swartwout
- Music by: Carter Burwell
- Production companies: Unity Productions; Linsefilm; Funky Buddha Group; Capitol Films
- Distributed by: ThinkFilm
- Release dates: September 6, 2007 (Deauville); October 26, 2007 (United States)
- Running time: 117 minutes
- Country: United States
- Language: English
- Budget: $18 million
- Box office: $25 million

Before the Devil Knows You're Dead is a 2007 American crime thriller film directed by Sidney Lumet. The film was written by Kelly Masterson, and stars Philip Seymour Hoffman, Ethan Hawke, Marisa Tomei, and Albert Finney. The title comes from the Irish saying: "May you be in heaven a full half-hour before the devil knows you're dead". The film unfolds in a nonlinear narrative, repeatedly going back and forth in time, with some scenes shown repeatedly from differing points of view. It was the last film Lumet directed before his death in 2011.

Before the Devil Knows You're Dead premiered at Deauville on September 6, 2007 before being released by ThinkFilm on October 26, 2007. The film appeared on 21 critics' end-of-the-year top ten lists indexed by Metacritic and was selected as one of 2007's ten best American films by the American Film Institute, at the 2007 AFI Awards.

== Plot ==
Facing an upcoming audit that will reveal he has been embezzling money from his employer, payroll manager Andy Hanson decides to flee to Brazil. To raise the funds he needs, he enlists the aid of his brother, Hank, a divorced father who desperately needs money to pay child support.

Hank is well-meaning but easily dominated by Andy, a ruthless schemer. Andy, in turn, resents his younger and more attractive brother, whom their parents favored.

Andy plans to have Hank rob their parents' jewelry store, describing it as a victimless crime because the store is insured. He says that he cannot go himself because he has been seen in the neighborhood recently, but that Doris, an elderly employee, will be alone in the store and that only a toy gun will be needed. Hank reluctantly agrees to the plan. Andy intends to fence the jewelry through a New York City dealer their father knows.

Without consulting Andy, Hank hires Bobby, an acquaintance who is an experienced thief, to help him. Before the robbery, Bobby reveals that he has a real gun and insists on entering the store himself while Hank waits in the car. The brothers' mother, Nanette, happens to be filling in for Doris, and while Bobby is distracted, Nanette grabs a hidden pistol and shoots him; he shoots her back, mortally wounding her, before she kills him with a second shot. Hank flees the scene. Nanette dies a few days later in the hospital. Unsatisfied with the police investigation, her husband, Charles, becomes obsessed with finding information about the crime.

Meanwhile, Bobby's brother-in-law Dex confronts Hank and demands financial compensation for Bobby's widow, Chris, threatening to either turn him over to the police or kill him if he does not come up with the money.

As well, while Andy is away from his office, his superiors repeatedly try to contact him regarding irregularities revealed by the audit.

At Nanette's wake, Andy and Charles have an emotional exchange. Charles tells Andy he loves him, but Andy says he has always felt like an outsider in the family. At home, Andy’s wife, Gina, expresses her frustration with their marriage and Andy's growing coldness. Andy, preoccupied with his problems, hardly reacts when Gina announces she is leaving him or even when she reveals that she has been having an affair with Hank; he gives her money before she leaves.

Charles learns about Andy’s visit to the fence and immediately goes looking for him. He follows Andy from his apartment tower, watches as he goes to Hank's apartment, and then tails his sons as they leave together.

Andy decides to resolve Hank's blackmail situation by robbing a heroin dealer he frequents, after which he plans to leave the country. At the dealer's apartment, Andy and Hank overpower and rob him. Hank is shocked when Andy shoots the dealer and a client who happens to be there. The brothers then meet Dex to pay him off, but Andy impulsively shoots him, too. Andy appears ready to kill Chris, but Hank objects as Chris's baby is heard crying in another room. Andy turns the gun on Hank, revealing that he knows about his affair with Gina. Hank begs Andy to kill him, but Chris then shoots Andy in the back with Dex's gun. Horrified, she screams at Hank to get out, and he does so after guiltily leaving some of the money behind for her.

Charles sees Hank fleeing the apartment and calls out to him, but Hank does not hear him and continues running. Andy is taken to the hospital, and Charles follows him there. Andy apologizes to his father, saying that he did not mean to hurt Nanette, who was not supposed to be in the store. Charles appears to accept Andy’s apology, but then suffocates his son to death with a pillow. As medical staff rush to help Andy, Charles walks away.

== Cast ==
- Philip Seymour Hoffman as Andrew 'Andy' Hanson
- Ethan Hawke as Henry 'Hank' Hanson
- Albert Finney as Charles Hanson
- Marisa Tomei as Gina Hanson
- Aleksa Palladino as Chris
- Michael Shannon as Dex
- Amy Ryan as Martha Hanson
- Sarah Livingston as Danielle Hanson
- Brían F. O'Byrne as Bobby Lasorda
- Rosemary Harris as Nanette Hanson
- Blaine Horton as Justin (dealer)
- Arija Bareikis as Katherine Hanson
- Leonardo Cimino as William (fence)
- Lee Wilkof as Jake (Andy's boss)
- Damon Gupton as Doctor
- Adrian Martinez as Security Guard
- Patrick G. Burns as Priest
- Jordan Gelber as Agent
- Tom Zolandz as Junkie (in dealer's apt.)

== Production ==
Director Sidney Lumet held two weeks of rehearsals with the cast before filming began, allowing the actors to work through their characters and relationships before shooting.

After experimenting with the format of high definition video on the television series 100 Centre Street, Lumet made the decision to shoot Before the Devil Knows You're Dead on the Panavision Genesis digital camera system. At a press conference at the 2007 New York Film Festival, Lumet called shooting on film "a pain in the ass," and predicted that as soon as distributors and exhibitors could agree on a digital projection format, photographic film would be rendered obsolete.

The primary robbery scene was filmed at the Bay Terrace Shopping Center in Bayside, Queens, New York.

Sidney Lumet knew Philip Seymour Hoffman was going to have more difficulty with the opening sex scene than Marisa Tomei. "I don't think Philip has ever conceived of himself in the nude fucking onscreen. It's just not something that comes his way. So when we started blocking, Marisa hopped up on the bed, got on her hands and knees, slapped her ass and said, 'Come on Phil, let's go!' I could kiss her. Because if Philip had any inhibitions, they were gone," Lumet said.

== Release ==
The film premiered on September 6, 2007, at the Festival of American Cinema in Deauville, France. It was also shown at the Toronto International Film Festival in Canada on September 13, 2007. It opened in France on September 26, 2007. The film made its American debut on October 12, 2007, at the New York Film Festival. It opened in limited release in the United States on October 26, 2007, in two theaters, grossing US$73,837 in its opening weekend. In total, the film grossed over US$25 million worldwide.

== Reception ==
Rotten Tomatoes, a review aggregator, reports that 89% of 180 surveyed critics gave the film a positive review; the average rating is 7.8/10. The website's critical consensus reads: "A tense and effective thriller, Before the Devil Knows You're Dead marks a triumphant return to form for director Sidney Lumet." On Metacritic, the film has a weighted average score of 86 out of 100, based on 37 critics, indicating "universal acclaim".

Time magazine's Richard Schickel named the movie one of the top 10 films of 2007, ranking it at #3, saying, "At one level the movie is a wonderfully intricate exploration of family dysfunction. At another, it's a coolly controlled examination of increasingly insane criminal ineptitude. Either way you look at it, this is a hypnotizing film from one of our great masters." Roger Ebert gave the film four stars out of four, calling it "superb" and its director, Sidney Lumet, a "living treasure."

=== Top 10 lists ===
The film appeared on many critics' top 10 lists of the best films of 2007.

- 1st - Stephen Farber, The Hollywood Reporter
- 1st - Steven Rea, The Philadelphia Inquirer
- 2nd - Marc Mohan, The Oregonian
- 2nd - Owen Gleiberman, Entertainment Weekly
- 3rd - Manohla Dargis, The New York Times
- 3rd - Richard Schickel, Time
- 3rd - Roger Ebert, Chicago Sun-Times
- 4th - Rene Rodriguez, The Miami Herald
- 5th - Marc Savlov, The Austin Chronicle
- 6th - Carina Chocano, Los Angeles Times
- 6th - Frank Scheck, The Hollywood Reporter
- 6th - Keith Phipps, The A.V. Club
- 7th - Scott Foundas, LA Weekly (tied with Eastern Promises)
- 8th - Jack Mathews, New York Daily News
- 8th - Peter Travers, Rolling Stone
- 8th - Ty Burr, The Boston Globe
- 9th - Mick LaSalle, San Francisco Chronicle
- 9th - Peter Vonder Haar, Film Threat
- 10th - Philip Martin, Arkansas Democrat-Gazette
- 10th - Stephen Hunter, The Washington Post

=== Awards and honors ===
- American Film Institute Awards 2007
- Boston Society of Film Critics Award for Best Cast
- Gotham Independent Film Award for Best Ensemble Cast
- Satellite Award for Best Cast – Motion Picture

== Home media ==
The film was released on DVD and Blu-ray on April 15, 2008.
