= Tom Wilkinson =

English actor (1948–2023)

Tom Wilkinson OBE
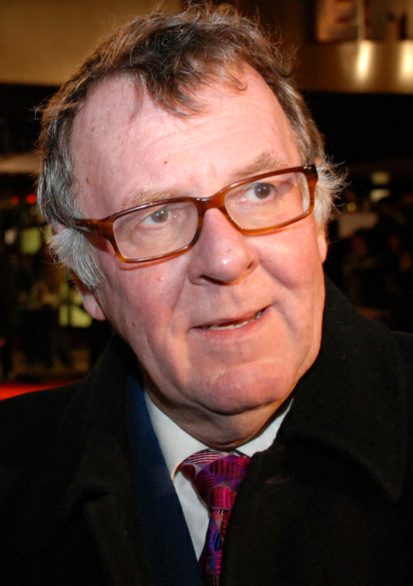
- Wilkinson in 2009
- Born: Thomas Geoffrey Wilkinson; 5 February 1948; Leeds, Yorkshire, England
- Died: 30 December 2023 (aged 75); London, England
- Education: University of Kent; Royal Academy of Dramatic Art
- Occupation: Actor
- Years active: 1976–2023
- Spouse: Diana Hardcastle (m. 1988)
- Children: 2

Thomas Geoffrey Wilkinson (5 February 1948 – 30 December 2023) was an English actor. Known for his roles on stage and screen, he received numerous accolades including a BAFTA Award, a Golden Globe Award, and a Primetime Emmy Award as well as nominations for two Academy Awards and two Laurence Olivier Awards. In 2005, he was made an Officer of the Order of the British Empire (OBE).

Wilkinson trained at the Royal Academy of Dramatic Art before making his West End debut portraying Horatio in Hamlet (1980) for which he received a nomination for the Laurence Olivier Award for Best Actor in a Supporting Role. He returned to the West End playing Dr. Stockmann in the Henrik Ibsen play An Enemy of the People (1988) receiving a Laurence Olivier Award for Actor of the Year in a Revival nomination.

Wilkinson received the BAFTA Award for Best Actor in a Supporting Role for The Full Monty (1997) as well as two Academy Award nominations, one for Best Actor for In the Bedroom (2001) and Best Supporting Actor for Michael Clayton (2007). He became known as a character actor, appearing in numerous films, such as: In the Name of the Father (1993), Sense and Sensibility (1995), Shakespeare in Love (1998), Rush Hour (1998), The Patriot (2000), Girl with a Pearl Earring (2003), Eternal Sunshine of the Spotless Mind (2004), Batman Begins (2005), Valkyrie (2008), RocknRolla (2008), The Ghost Writer (2010), The Best Exotic Marigold Hotel (2011), Belle (2013), Selma (2014), The Grand Budapest Hotel (2014) and Denial (2016).

In 2009 he won a Golden Globe Award and a Primetime Emmy Award for Outstanding Supporting Actor in a Miniseries or a Movie for playing Benjamin Franklin in the HBO limited series John Adams (2008). His other Emmy-nominated roles were as Roy/Ruth Applewood in the HBO film Normal (2003), James Baker in the HBO film Recount (2008), and Joseph P. Kennedy Sr. in the limited series The Kennedys (2011).

== Early life and education ==
Thomas Geoffrey Wilkinson was born on 5 February 1948 in Leeds, West Riding of Yorkshire, the son of Marjorie and Thomas Wilkinson, a farmer. At the age of 11, he and his family moved to Kitimat, British Columbia, Canada, where they lived for five years before returning to the United Kingdom and running a pub in Cornwall. Wilkinson graduated in English and American literature from the University of Kent at Canterbury. While at university, Wilkinson became preoccupied with acting and directing with the University of Kent Drama Society (now called T24 Drama Society). After finishing his degree, Wilkinson then attended the Royal Academy of Dramatic Art in London, graduating in 1973.

== Career ==
=== 1973–1994: Rise to prominence ===
Wilkinson made his acting debut on stage at the Nottingham Playhouse. In 1976 he appeared his first film, the thriller Smuga cienia, directed by Andrzej Wajda, an adaption of Joseph Conrad's novel The Shadow-Line. He later joined the Royal Shakespeare Company and made his West End debut as Horatio in the 1981 RSC production of William Shakespeare's Hamlet at the Aldwych Theatre, for which he was nominated for the Laurence Olivier Award for Best Actor in a Supporting Role. He went on to act in supporting roles in the British thriller Parker (1984), the biographical film Sylvia (1985), and the mystery Wetherby (1985). He also worked on several British television series, most notably portraying Raymond Gould in the ITV mini-series First Among Equals (1986). He was simultaneously appearing in this series on television and on the West End stage in Henrik Ibsen's Ghosts, in which he played Pastor Manders. In 1988, he played Dr. Stockmann in a West End production of Ibsen's An Enemy of the People at the Playhouse Theatre. For his performance, he was nominated for the Laurence Olivier Award for Actor of the Year in a Revival. In 1993, he had a small role as an Appeal Prosecutor, Grant Richardson in Jim Sheridan's biographical crime drama In the Name of the Father starring Daniel Day-Lewis and Emma Thompson. He first gained critical acclaim with his appearance as Seth Pecksniff in the BBC's 1994 adaptation of Martin Chuzzlewit based on the Charles Dickens novel of the same name.

=== 1995–2008: Breakthrough and acclaim ===
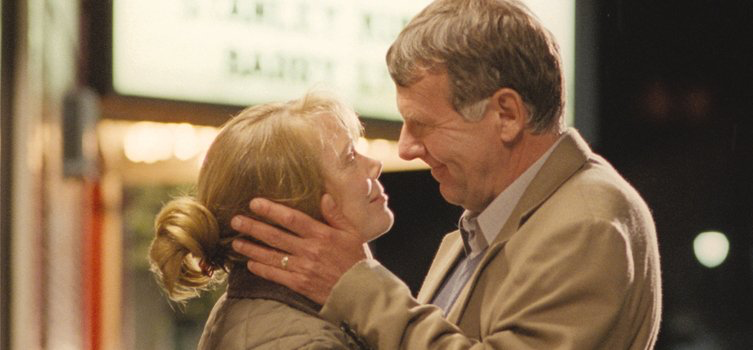
Sissy Spacek and Wilkinson in Todd Field's In the Bedroom (2001)

Wilkinson had a small but important role as the dying father, Mr. Dashwood, in the Ang Lee-directed Sense and Sensibility (1995), and played a villain in the adventure drama The Ghost and the Darkness (1996). The following year, he gained acclaim for his leading role as Gerald Cooper, an ex-foreman who reluctantly joins a group of unemployed steelworkers as a stripper, in the ensemble cast comedy-drama The Full Monty (1997). For his performance, he won the BAFTA Award for Best Actor in a Supporting Role. That same year, he portrayed Marquess of Queensberry in the biographical drama Wilde and Hugh Stratton in the romantic drama Oscar and Lucinda. In 1998, he acted in the British romantic costume drama Shakespeare in Love starring Gwyneth Paltrow, Joseph Fiennes, Geoffrey Rush, and Judi Dench. The film received acclaim and Wilkinson, along with the cast, won the Screen Actors Guild Award for Outstanding Performance by a Cast in a Motion Picture. He played the evil British Ambassador/Juntao in the buddy cop movie Rush Hour (1998) starring Jackie Chan and Chris Tucker, and General Lord Cornwallis in the historical war drama film The Patriot (2000) starring Mel Gibson and Heath Ledger.

Wilkinson won wider critical acclaim for his portrayal of grieving father Matt Fowler in Todd Field's In the Bedroom (2001), with co-stars Sissy Spacek and Marisa Tomei. For this performance, he won the New York Film Critics Circle Award for Best Actor and was nominated for the Academy Award for Best Actor. He then took roles in the period films The Importance of Being Earnest (2002) and Girl with a Pearl Earring (2003). For his role as Roy/Ruth Applewood in the HBO film Normal he received a nominations for the Primetime Emmy Award and Golden Globe Award. The following year he played Dr. Howard Mierzwiak in the Michel Gondry-directed science fiction romantic comedy Eternal Sunshine of the Spotless Mind (2004) starring Jim Carrey and Kate Winslet. He portrayed Carmine Falcone in Christopher Nolan's superhero film Batman Begins (2005). He also acted in films such as the horror film The Exorcism of Emily Rose (2005), Julian Fellowes' drama Separate Lies (2005), and Woody Allen's Cassandra's Dream (2007).

In 2007, Wilkinson played Arthur Edens, an attorney with bipolar disorder, in Michael Clayton. The performance, which Variety described as "terrific", earned him an Academy Award for Best Supporting Actor nomination. In 2008, Wilkinson portrayed American polymath Benjamin Franklin in the HBO mini-series John Adams, for which he received a Primetime Emmy Award and Golden Globe Award, as well as a Screen Actors Guild Award nomination. That same year he starred in another HBO project, the political drama Recount, in which Wilkinson portrayed American political adviser and lawyer, James A. Baker, in Baker's capacity as Chief Counsel to George W. Bush during the 2000 U.S. Presidential Election, receiving an Emmy Award nomination. He portrayed Friedrich Fromm, acting alongside Tom Cruise, in the World War II thriller Valkyrie and acted in the Guy Ritchie action film RocknRolla (both 2008).

=== 2009–2023: Established actor ===
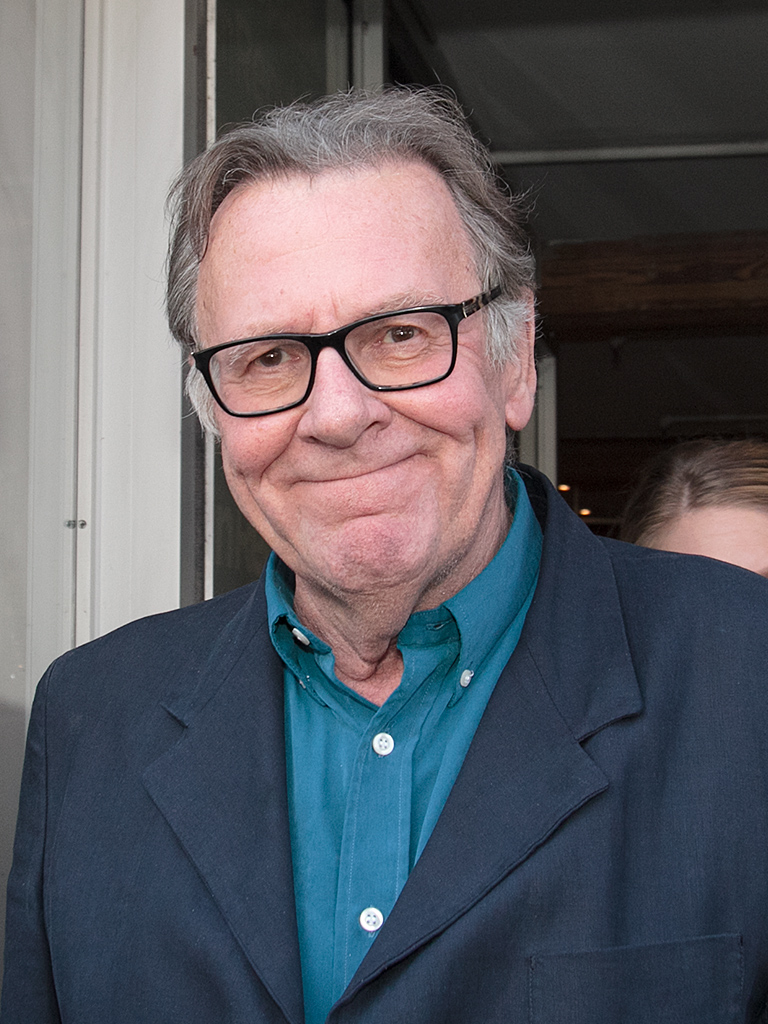
Wilkinson in 2016

During this time Wilkinson starred in a string of thrillers including Duplicity (2009), The Conspirator (2010), and The Debt (2010). Also in 2010, he starred in the John Landis directed horror comedy Burke and Hare and portrayed a covert CIA agent in Roman Polanski's The Ghost Writer. He gained acclaim portraying Joseph P. Kennedy Sr., in the 2011 television miniseries The Kennedys, for which he was nominated for a Primetime Emmy Award. He and his wife portrayed husband and wife Joe and Rose Kennedy. Earlier that year, he appeared in the comedy film The Green Hornet and the action film Mission: Impossible – Ghost Protocol. The following year he acted in the comedy The Best Exotic Marigold Hotel starring opposite Judi Dench, Bill Nighy, Dev Patel and Maggie Smith. David Rooney of The Hollywood Reporter praised his performance writing, "Observed with sensitivity and played with a deep well of sorrow by Wilkinson, this story breathes real tenderness into the movie's reflections on growing older and making peace with past mistakes".

In 2013, he portrayed Lord Mansfield in the costume drama Belle starring Gugu Mbatha-Raw. The following year Wilkinson portrayed Lyndon B. Johnson, the 36^{th} President of the United States, in Ava DuVernay's historical drama film Selma (2014), and had a role in Wes Anderson's comedy The Grand Budapest Hotel (2014). He had a lead role alongside Vince Vaughn and Dave Franco in the comedy Unfinished Business (2015). In 2016, he portrayed journalist Ewen MacAskill in Snowden starring Joseph Gordon-Levitt and barrister Richard Rampton in Denial acting alongside Rachel Weisz and Timothy Spall. He briefly reprised his role as Joseph P. Kennedy Sr. in The Kennedys: After Camelot (2017). He voiced Threarah in the BBC One series Watership Down (2018), and played Peregrine, Earl of Brockenhurst in the Julian Fellowes historical drama Belgravia (2019). His final appearance was in a television version of The Full Monty.

== Personal life and death ==
Wilkinson lived in North London with his wife, actress Diana Hardcastle. They had two daughters.

Wilkinson died suddenly at his home in London, on 30 December 2023, at the age of 75.

== Acting credits ==
=== Film ===
List of Tom Wilkinson film credits
| Year | Title | Role | Notes |
|---|---|---|---|
| 1976 | Smuga cienia | Chef Ransome | |
| 1984 | Parker | Tom | |
| 1985 | Sylvia | Keith Henderson | |
| 1985 | Wetherby | Roger Braithwaite | |
| 1990 | Paper Mask | Dr. Thorn | |
| 1993 | In the Name of the Father | Grant Richardson | |
| 1994 | Priest | Father Matthew Thomas | |
| 1994 | A Business Affair | Bob | |
| 1994 | Prince of Jutland | Hardvendel | |
| 1995 | Sense and Sensibility | Mr. Dashwood | |
| 1996 | The Ghost and the Darkness | Robert Beaumont | |
| 1997 | Smilla's Sense of Snow | Prof. Loyen | |
| 1997 | The Full Monty | Gerald Arthur Cooper | |
| 1997 | Wilde | Marquess of Queensberry | |
| 1997 | Oscar and Lucinda | Hugh Stratton | |
| 1998 | The Governess | Charles Cavendish | |
| 1998 | Rush Hour | Thomas Griffin/Juntao | |
| 1998 | Shakespeare in Love | Hugh Fennyman | |
| 1999 | Ride with the Devil | Orton Brown | |
| 1999 | Molokai: The Story of Father Damien | Brother Joseph Dutton | |
| 2000 | Essex Boys | John Dyke | |
| 2000 | The Patriot | General Lord Cornwallis | |
| 2000 | Chain of Fools | Robert Bollingsworth | |
| 2001 | In the Bedroom | Matt Fowler | |
| 2001 | Another Life | Mr. Carlton | |
| 2001 | Black Knight | Sir Knolte of Malborough | |
| 2002 | The Importance of Being Earnest | Dr. Chasuble | |
| 2002 | Before You Go | Frank | |
| 2003 | Girl with a Pearl Earring | Pieter van Ruijven | |
| 2004 | If Only | Taxi driver | |
| 2004 | Piccadilly Jim | Bingley Crocker | |
| 2004 | Eternal Sunshine of the Spotless Mind | Howard Mierzwiak | |
| 2004 | Stage Beauty | Betterton | |
| 2004 | A Good Woman | Tuppy | |
| 2005 | Ripley Under Ground | John Webster | |
| 2005 | Batman Begins | Carmine Falcone | |
| 2005 | The Exorcism of Emily Rose | Father Moore | |
| 2005 | Separate Lies | James Manning | |
| 2006 | The Night of the White Pants | Max Hagan | |
| 2006 | The Last Kiss | Stephen | |
| 2007 | Dedication | Rudy Holt | |
| 2007 | Cassandra's Dream | Howard | |
| 2007 | Michael Clayton | Arthur Edens | |
| 2008 | RocknRolla | Lenny Cole | |
| 2008 | Valkyrie | Colonel General Friedrich Fromm | |
| 2009 | Duplicity | Howard Tully | |
| 2009 | 44 Inch Chest | Archie | |
| 2010 | The Ghost Writer | Paul Emmett | |
| 2010 | Burke & Hare | Dr. Robert Knox | |
| 2010 | Jackboots on Whitehall | Albert and Joseph Goebbels | Voice |
| 2011 | The Green Hornet | James Reid | |
| 2011 | The Conspirator | Reverdy Johnson | |
| 2011 | The Debt | Stefan Gold | |
| 2011 | Mission: Impossible – Ghost Protocol | IMF Secretary | Uncredited |
| 2012 | The Best Exotic Marigold Hotel | Sir Graham Dashwood | |
| 2012 | The Samaritan | Xavier | |
| 2013 | The Lone Ranger | Latham Cole | |
| 2013 | Belle | Lord Mansfield | |
| 2013 | Felony | Detective Carl Summer | |
| 2014 | The Grand Budapest Hotel | Author | |
| 2014 | Good People | Detective Inspector John Halden | |
| 2014 | Selma | President Lyndon B. Johnson | |
| 2015 | Unfinished Business | Timothy McWinters | |
| 2015 | Bone in the Throat | Charlie | |
| 2015 | Little Boy | Fr. Oliver | |
| 2015 | Jenny's Wedding | Eddie | |
| 2016 | The Choice | Dr. Shep | |
| 2016 | Snowden | Ewen MacAskill | |
| 2016 | Denial | Richard Rampton | |
| 2016 | This Beautiful Fantastic | Alfie Stephenson | |
| 2018 | The Catcher Was a Spy | Paul Scherrer | |
| 2018 | Burden | Tom Griffin | |
| 2018 | Dead in a Week or Your Money Back | Leslie | |
| 2018 | The Happy Prince | Fr. Dunne | |
| 2018 | The Titan | Professor Martin Collingwood | |
| 2021 | Dr. Bird's Advice for Sad Poets | Dr. Bird | Voice |
| 2021 | SAS: Red Notice | William Lewis | |

=== Television ===
List of Tom Wilkinson television credits
| Year | Title | Role | Notes |
|---|---|---|---|
| 1979 | Crime and Punishment | Cadet | Episode: "Part 1" |
| 1983 | Panorama | Czuma | Episode: "Two Weeks in Winter: How the Army Took Over Poland" |
| 1983 | Spyship | Martin Taylor | Miniseries |
| 1984 | Strangers and Brothers | George Passant | 2 episodes |
| 1984 | Sharma and Beyond | Vivian | Television film |
| 1984 | Squaring the Circle | Rulewski | Television film |
| 1985 | A Pocket Full of Rye | Detective Inspector Neele | Television film |
| 1985 | Happy Families | Jack | Episode: "Cassie" |
| 1986 | First Among Equals | Raymond Gould | Miniseries |
| 1988 | The Woman He Loved | Ernest Aldrich Simpson | Television film |
| 1988 | The Attic: The Hiding of Anne Frank | Silberbauer | Television film |
| 1988 | The Ruth Rendell Mysteries | Robert Hathall | 3 episodes |
| 1989 | First and Last | Stephen | Television film |
| 1990 | Inspector Morse | Jake Normington | Episode: "The Infernal Serpent" |
| 1990 | TECX | Hugo Gillon | Episode: "The Wine Business" |
| 1990–1996 | Screen Two | David Hanratty / Father McAteer / Dr. Middleton | 4 episodes |
| 1991 | Parnell & the Englishwoman | Sir Charles Russell | Episode: "The Libel" |
| 1991 | Lovejoy | Ashley Wilkes | Episode: "One Born Every Minute" |
| 1991 | Prime Suspect | Peter Rawlins | 2 episodes |
| 1992 | Underbelly | Paul Manning | Miniseries |
| 1992 | Resnick: Lonely Hearts | Detective Inspector Charlie Resnick | Television film |
| 1993 | Resnick: Rough Treatment | Detective Inspector Charlie Resnick | Television film |
| 1993 | Stay Lucky | Allon | Episode: "Gilding the Lily" |
| 1994 | The Inspector Alleyn Mysteries | Gerald Lacklander | Episode: "Scales of Justice" |
| 1994 | Shakespeare: The Animated Tales | Buckingham (voice) | Episode: "King Richard II" |
| 1994 | Performance | Duke Vincentio | Episode: "Measure for Measure" |
| 1994 | Martin Chuzzlewit | Seth Pecksniff | Miniseries |
| 1996 | Eskimo Day | Hugh Lloyd | Television film |
| 1997 | Cold Enough for Snow | Hugh Lloyd | Television film |
| 1999 | David Copperfield | Narrator (Old David Copperfield) | Television film |
| 2002 | The Gathering Storm | Sir Robert Vansittart | Television film |
| 2002 | An Angel for May | Sam Wheeler | Television film |
| 2003 | Normal | Roy/Ruth Applewood | Television film |
| 2008 | John Adams | Benjamin Franklin | Miniseries |
| 2008 | Recount | James Baker | Television film |
| 2008 | A Number | Salter | Television film |
| 2009 | The Gruffalo | Fox (voice) | Television film |
| 2011 | The Gruffalo's Child | Fox (voice) | Television film |
| 2011 | The Kennedys | Joseph P. Kennedy Sr. | Miniseries |
| 2017 | The Kennedys: After Camelot | Joseph P. Kennedy Sr. | Cameo |
| 2018 | Watership Down | Threarah (voice) | Miniseries |
| 2020 | Belgravia | Peregrine, Earl of Brockenhurst | 6 episodes |
| 2023 | The Full Monty | Gerald Arthur Cooper | 6 episodes |

=== Theatre ===
List of Tom Wilkinson theatre credits
| Year | Title | Role | Notes |
|---|---|---|---|
| 1980 | Hamlet | Horatio | Aldwych Theatre, West End |
| 1988 | An Enemy of the People | Dr. Stockmann | Playhouse Theatre, West End |

=== Video games ===
List of Tom Wilkinson video game credits
| Year | Title | Voice role |
|---|---|---|
| 2005 | Batman Begins | Carmine Falcone |
| 2012 | Sleeping Dogs | Superintendent Thomas Pendrew |

== Awards and honours ==
Wilkinson received a Doctor of Letters honorary degree from the University of Kent in July 2001. In the 2005 New Year Honours, he was appointed Officer of the Order of the British Empire (OBE) "for services to Drama".

== See also ==
- List of Academy Award winners and nominees from Great Britain
- List of actors with Academy Award nominations
- List of actors with more than one Academy Award nomination in the acting categories
- List of British actors
