= The Kennedys (miniseries) =

2011 American miniseriess

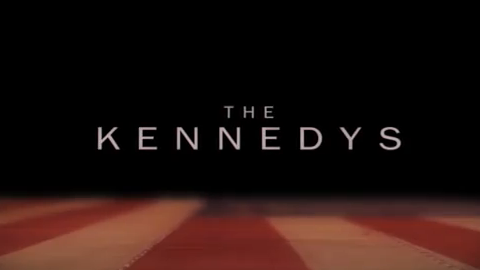
- Genre: Historical drama
- Written by: Stephen Kronish; Joel Surnow
- Directed by: Jon Cassar
- Starring: Greg Kinnear; Barry Pepper; Katie Holmes; Tom Wilkinson
- Composer: Sean Callery
- Countries of origin: Canada; United States
- Original language: English
- No. of episodes: 8

Production
- Executive producers: Michael Prupas; Joel Surnow; Jonathan Koch; Steve Michaels; Jon Cassar; Jamie Paul Rock
- Production locations: Hamilton, Toronto, in Ontario
- Cinematography: David Moxness
- Running time: 45 minutes (single episode); 353 minutes (full running time)
- Production companies: Muse; Asylum Entertainment; Shaw Media

Original release
- Network: History Television (Canada); Reelz Channel (United States)
- Release: April 3 – April 10, 2011

Related
- The Kennedys: After Camelot

The Kennedys is a 2011 television miniseries chronicling the lives of the political Kennedy family, including key triumphs and tragedies it has experienced. It stars Greg Kinnear, Barry Pepper, Katie Holmes, and Tom Wilkinson, and is directed by Jon Cassar. The series premiered in the United States in April 2011 on the Reelz Channel, on History Television in Canada and on the History Channel in the United Kingdom.

== Cast ==
=== Main ===
- Greg Kinnear as John F. "Jack" Kennedy
- Barry Pepper as Robert F. "Bobby" Kennedy
- Katie Holmes as Jacqueline Kennedy
- Tom Wilkinson as Joseph P. Kennedy Sr.
- Diana Hardcastle as Rose Kennedy
- Kristin Booth as Ethel Kennedy

=== Guest ===
- Chris Diamantopoulos as Frank Sinatra
- Charlotte Sullivan as Marilyn Monroe
- Gabriel Hogan as Joseph P. Kennedy Jr.
- Ryan Blakely as Lee Harvey Oswald

=== Recurring ===
- Serge Houde as Sam Giancana
- Enrico Colantoni as J. Edgar Hoover
- Don Allison as Lyndon B. Johnson
- Rothaford Gray as Abraham Bolden
- Ava Preston as Caroline Kennedy
- Carson Reaume as David Kennedy

== Production ==
=== Early criticism ===
The Kennedys was the subject of negative responses from historians based on early scripts, including charges of historical inaccuracy and presenting an unflattering depiction of the titular family. On February 16, 2010, the website stopkennedysmears.com was registered by filmmaker Robert Greenwald as part of the critical response to The Kennedys. Eight days later, Dave Itzkoff of The New York Times reported that historian David Talbot, whose recent book had been used as source material for the miniseries, had joined those preemptively criticizing The Kennedys. Ted Sorensen (1928–2010), former presidential aide and speech writer for 35th President John F. Kennedy (1917–1963, served 1961–1963), described the script as a "character assassination". At the time of all of this criticism, the miniseries had not even been cast yet.

In an interview published in The Los Angeles Times on June 17, 2010, Joel Surnow addressed the complaints, saying, "they looked at early drafts of script that don't even resemble the final draft. It was way too early for them to comment on it." However, as the British newspaper The Daily Telegraph put it: "With Greg Kinnear as Mr. Kennedy, Katie Holmes as his First Lady and a budget of $30 million dollars, expectations had been high. Now, it is widely considered a disaster on the eve of its airing on the ReelzChannel beginning on Sunday. The History Channel decided to drop the series from its schedule in January 2011, stating that it was 'not a fit' for the network. There then followed a humiliating and very public quest to find another channel that would air it."

=== Casting ===
Casting the main roles was announced on April 29, 2010, by director Cassar via his Twitter account. The miniseries was filmed in Toronto, Ontario, Canada between June and September 2010, and was produced by Canadian independent studio Muse Entertainment Enterprises and Joel Surnow's production company. The Kennedys is the first original scripted series made for History Television. The budget for The Kennedys was $25 million though reports later described it as a $30 million production. The miniseries was primarily written by Stephen Kronish, who previously worked with Surnow and Cassar on 24.

Historians associated with the production were Steven M. Gillon, author of the book The Kennedy Assassination – 24 Hours After, and Robert Dallek.

== Broadcast history ==
=== Canada ===
On December 16, 2010, Shaw Media announced that there would be a special screening of the miniseries to be held on March 3, 2011, in Toronto. The Canadian Broadcasting Corporation reported on January 13, 2011, that Shaw Media would be showing The Kennedys in March 2011, but they were uncertain about whether it would remain on History Television or be moved to their broadcast network Global, or one of their other cable channels such as Showcase. The miniseries had been scheduled on History in two-hour segments at 9:00 pm beginning on March 6, 2011, and continuing for three subsequent Sundays. John Doyle, television critic for The Globe and Mail reported on January 26, 2011, that The Kennedys will be shown on History Television starting on March 9, 2011. Six days later, it was reported that Stan Hubbard, CEO of ReelzChannel, claimed that part of his acquisition deal for US rights would be worldwide premiere rights, forcing an uncertain delay in the originally announced television premiere in March 2011 on History Television in Canada. On February 1, 2011, Shaw Media announced its revised schedule for the miniseries, which was to be shown on History Television in four two-hour segments beginning on April 10, 2011.

=== United States ===
On January 7, 2011, the cable channel History announced that it would not show The Kennedys in the United States, stating "this dramatic interpretation is not a fit for the History brand."

Michael Prupas, president of Muse Entertainment and executive producer of the miniseries, issued a statement on January 10, in which he addressed the claims of inaccuracies: "The decision of the History Channel not to broadcast the show was made long after the executives of the Channel as well as the Channel's resident historian (who is a Kennedy expert) had read and approved all of the scripts and viewed and approved all of the final cuts of all of the episodes. Furthermore, our Errors and Omissions Insurer's attorneys reviewed all the scripts and edited episodes – and they have cleared all of the episodes for broadcast."

Director Jon Cassar said at the January 2011 Television Critics Association gathering in Los Angeles that he believed the reason the miniseries would not be shown by History and other US broadcasters was because powerful people within the United States connected to the Kennedy family took exception to it and used their political and other influence to prevent the showing.

Joel Surnow, the series' executive producer, attributed the cancellation to pressure exerted by the Kennedys on the board of History's owners, A&E Television Networks and The Walt Disney Company. Surnow stated: "It happened at the board level. I don't want to mention anyone by name. It's very simple to say that certain board members are friends with the Kennedys." Other reports pinpointed Kennedy family members Maria Shriver and Caroline Kennedy as the leaders of the campaign to stop the show, targeting Disney executive Anne Sweeney.

On January 12, Showtime passed on the US broadcasting rights for The Kennedys. Two days later, it was reported that DirecTV's The 101 Network was considering acquiring the miniseries. On January 24, it was announced that The 101 Network also passed on airing the show. Eight days later, ReelzChannel acquired US broadcast rights to The Kennedys and announced their intention to show the miniseries between April 3 and 10, 2011. Other US cable channels reported to have declined acquisition of the miniseries are FX and Starz.

Mediaweek reported that Hubbard Broadcasting, the owners of ReelzChannel, took a big risk in purchasing the rights to the miniseries by paying an estimated $7 million for the broadcast rights and spending an additional $10 million in advertising.

=== United Kingdom ===
In the United Kingdom, History UK was scheduled to screen the miniseries beginning on April 7, 2011. Tom Davidson, managing director of AETN-UK stated on the History website: "Securing the UK premiere of The Kennedys is a major coup for the History channel. Bringing to life the story of America's most iconic family, the drama is a bold and epic account of the Kennedy dynasty and we are delighted that viewers in the UK will get to see it on History first." Writing in The Daily Telegraph, TV director Sebastian Doggart commented:

This is an amazing example of double standards. How can AETN call the series "not a fit" for the US History Channel, but describe this "bold and epic account" as "a major coup" for the UK's History channel? AETN has suggested that the reason is that the US History Channel is especially concerned about its historically truthful brand. So what is the channel broadcasting this Sunday night, in the same time-slot as The Kennedys over on Reelz? The answer: Ax Men, a reality show about loggers; and Swamp People, another reality show about alligator hunters.

Also in the UK, the BBC presented the series, beginning Friday, June 17, 2011, in both standard definition and HD.

=== Other countries ===
The series began broadcasting in Serbia on B92 beginning on May 6, 2011; in Republic of Ireland on RTÉ One beginning on May 21, 2011; and in Australia on ABC1, beginning on May 22, 2011.

In Italy the series aired on History Channel starting on June 7, 2011, in France on France 3 in Summer 2011, Finland on YLE TV1 beginning on September 16, 2011, and in Ireland on RTÉ Two that same fall. In Spain, Cosmopolitan Television started broadcasting the series on Jan 29, 2012.

In China, the series aired on LeTV.com in SD (Free VOD) and HD (Subscription VOD) beginning March 16, 2012, Slovakia on Jednotka beginning April 28, 2012, Germany on Arte on July 26, 2012. and in Indiaon History TV 18 that June. In Romania, the miniseries aired on TVR1 in December 2013, and Sweden aired it on SVT in November 2013, 50 years after the assassination of President Kennedy.

== Episodes ==
No.	Title	Directed by	Written by	Original release date
1	"Joe's Revenge"	Jon Cassar	Stephen Kronish	April 3, 2011
Joseph P. Kennedy Sr. as United States Ambassador to the United Kingdom in 1938, tries to keep his country out of World War II, having openly supported the Munich Agreement despite President Franklin D. Roosevelt's clear opposition. Roosevelt pressures the ambassador into resigning in 1940. After America's entry into World War II, Joe Jr. and Jack are commissioned as naval officers, despite their father's previous opposition to the war. Jack serves in the war commanding Motor Torpedo Boat PT-109 in the Pacific and is awarded the Navy and Marine Corps Medal after PT-109 is cut in half and sunk by a Japanese destroyer. Joe Jr. becomes a Naval Aviator and serves in the European theater; he dies in Operation Aphrodite, attempting to beat Jack's war hero status. Joe Sr. wants Jack eventually to become president.
2	"The First Campaign"	Jon Cassar	Stephen Kronish	April 3, 2011
Greatly aided by his father, Jack successfully runs for the United States House of Representatives in 1946 and for the United States Senate in 1952. In 1953, Jack marries Jacqueline Bouvier even after Jackie's mother warns her that Jack will have multiple affairs, just like Joe Sr. and Jackie's father. Jack wins the 1960 presidential election. The personal relationships among the various members of the Kennedy clan are explored, including the strain between Robert F. Kennedy and his father Joe. Disgusted by Jack's repeated infidelity, Jackie threatens to divorce him, but Joe promises that if she stays married until at least 1960, thus protecting her husband's political career, she will receive $1,000,000 from a trust fund.
3	"Bay of Pigs"	Jon Cassar	Stephen Kronish & Joel Surnow	April 5, 2011
John F. Kennedy Jr. is born, and Bobby, very reluctantly, is appointed Attorney General after Joe prevails on Bobby to accept the post. In his position, Bobby clashes with FBI Chief J. Edgar Hoover. Jack faces the first test of his presidency with the failed Bay of Pigs Invasion, leading Joe to impress upon Bobby the importance of his role as his brother's adviser. Rose Kennedy commiserates with and advises Jackie on the burdens of marriage to a powerful man. Hoover confronts the Kennedy brothers with photographs of Jack's sexual affair with Judith Campbell Exner, a woman with known ties to Chicago Mafia leaders Sam Giancana and John Roselli.
4	"Bobby's War"	Jon Cassar	Stephen Kronish & Joel Surnow	April 6, 2011
In Chicago, prior to the 1960 presidential election, Joe seeks an alliance with Mafia gangster Sam Giancana to secure Illinois' electoral votes for Jack. Giancana believes Frank Sinatra, who claims that there is a deal in which the Mafia will be left alone. In the White House, the President faces increasing trouble from his Addison's disease, turning to Dr. Max Jacobson for amphetamine shots. Jackie struggles to balance her family with her role as First Lady; she turns to Jacobson as well. Bobby gears up for his war on the Mafia. Jack integrates the United States Secret Service Presidential Protective Division with the appointment of Abraham Bolden. Sinatra tries to intercede with Joe on Giancana's behalf; Joe rebuffs him but cautions Bobby. The administration monitors the Soviet Union's buildup on the border of East Berlin leading to the 1961 construction of the Berlin wall. After Hoover plays Bobby a wiretap of Giancana and Johnny Roselli implicating Joe in election fraud, the brothers cut Joe out of Jack's presidency. Joe, however, insists that he never made a deal with the Mafia.
5	"Life Sentences"	Jon Cassar	Stephen Kronish & Joel Surnow	April 7, 2011
Escalating racial tensions in the summer of 1961 see Jack turn to Vice-President Lyndon B. Johnson for help in handling the Southern Congressional delegation. Segregation presents further challenges to the Kennedy presidency when James Meredith tries to enroll in the whites-only University of Mississippi. Governor Ross R. Barnett and the Ku Klux Klan inflame the mob, leading Jack to order out the U.S. Marshals, then the National Guard, culminating in the Ole Miss riot of 1962. Jackie grows more dependent on amphetamines, leading Jack to confront her and Jackie to confess her fears to him. Joe suffers a massive debilitating stroke leaving him unable to talk. Caring for him leads Rose to recall her daughter Rosemary and her emotional problems, which led to Joe's decision to have Rosemary lobotomized without telling his wife beforehand in 1941. Following the surgery that was meant to calm her anxiety, she does not recognize her parents and becomes mentally incapacitated.
6	"Cuban Missiles"	Jon Cassar	Stephen Kronish & Joel Surnow	April 8, 2011
The Kennedy brothers face the gravest problem, a threat to all humanity with the discovery of Soviet missile bases under construction in Cuba. The Cuban Missile Crisis tests Jack to his limits. After fears of a nuclear war, despite many generals wanting a bombing of Cuba, Jack agrees with Nikita Khrushchev that he will dismantle bases in Turkey and leave Cuba alone if the Soviets dismantle their Cuban bases. Jack faces more problems, the possible loss of his marriage after Jackie is publicly humiliated by his affair with Mary Meyer, but they reconcile at the end of the episode.
7	"Lancer and Lace"	Jon Cassar	Stephen Kronish	April 10, 2011
Jack and Jackie lose their newborn son, Patrick. Jack goes to Texas to defuse rumors of a split in the Democratic Party. Despite fears for his safety, meaning that there are unprecedented precautions, he is wildly acclaimed. Marilyn Monroe is obsessed with Jack in the days leading up to her suicide but is warned against blackmailing him. Joe is persuaded by Rose to stand up with his massive pain so that he can greet his children when they arrive but collapses back on his seat after he hears and sees on TV that Jack has just been assassinated by Lee Harvey Oswald, an ex-Marine who was waiting at the Texas School Book Depository where he was working as an employee.
8	"My Brother's Keeper"	Jon Cassar	Stephen Kronish	April 10, 2011
Jack Ruby kills Lee Harvey Oswald. Bobby, feeling guilty as he thinks the killing was in revenge for his anti-Mafia activities, tries to comfort his father. Bobby still runs for senator in New York and wins. In 1968, Bobby decides to run for president but, at first, his campaign goes badly and he loses the Oregon primary. Bobby remembers how Jack won a narrow 1952 race for US senator, despite initial fears. Bobby then wins the California primary but is shot and mortally wounded that night at the Ambassador Hotel by Sirhan Sirhan. Rose mourns Joe's death in 1969, and Jackie marries Aristotle Onassis.

== Critical reception ==
=== Canada ===
John Doyle of The Globe and Mail wrote, "it is awful – truly, mind-bogglingly tedious television." "The series (made in Canada with Muse Entertainment as the production company) looks cheap and sticks to the TV dramatics level of an afternoon soap opera." Doyle makes note of the predominantly Canadian cast and hopes they get a career boost but that the miniseries was "boosted by a fake controversy" and believes that "the American History Channel dropped it because it's bad TV."

=== United States ===
The miniseries met with a mixed reception from US critics. Based on 24 reviews from mainstream critics, it received an average score of 50/100 at Metacritic, indicating "mixed or average reviews".

Mark A. Perigard of the Boston Herald noted that there is no mention of Joseph and Rose Kennedy's other children, including the future Senator Ted Kennedy and Kathleen Cavendish, Marchioness of Hartington, and that it feels as though you are watching "through the prism of the Fringe universe". Perigard found it to be "an absorbing, addictive drama, with some authentic performances" but not history. Alessandra Stanley of The New York Times wrote a joint review of The Kennedys and of The Borgias, which premiered the same day. In addressing the circumstances of the premiere she wrote, "There is something wonderfully Kennedyesque about a backroom campaign to discredit a series that claims the Kennedy White House had more than its share of backroom shenanigans." Stanley found the miniseries to be well made though at times cheesy, but that its strongest point is Tom Wilkinson as Joseph Kennedy, whom she describes, in tandem with Rodrigo Borgia, as "A ruthless, tyrannical striver (who) grasps for power, promoting his sons to establish his rule and cement his legacy".

Hank Stuever of The Washington Post found the miniseries "all ends up being as harmless as a game of Kennedy paper dolls" and the assassinations to be portrayed quite gently considering how violent Joel Surnow's show 24 is. Stuever describes the screenplay as clumsy and find the miniseries "sketches its characters with the precision of a fat Sharpie marker" and cautions those who recall the time that they may be troubled watching the story "through Surnow and company's mean-spirited gaze". In moving on to review Camelot, which premiered three days before The Kennedys, Stuever wrote, "If you check your calendar, we're nearing the 50th anniversary of JFK's death, which makes him, his family and Cabinet members as fair game as King Arthur, Guinevere, Merlin and the gang, who've had their stories updated, revised and pillaged for centuries now."

=== U.S. Nielsen ratings ===
Episode(s)	Title(s)	Date	Total viewers (original)	Total viewers (original + encores)
1 & 2	Joe's Revenge / The First Campaign	April 3, 2011	1,300,000	1,900,000
3	Bay of Pigs	April 5, 2011	841,000	1,773,000
4	Bobby's War	April 6, 2011	806,250	1,716,915
5	Life Sentences	April 7, 2011	737,237	1,600,000
6	Cuban Missiles	April 8, 2011	TBA	TBA
7 & 8	Lancer and Lace / My Brother's Keeper	April 10, 2011	1,400,000	1,900,000

=== United Kingdom ratings ===
In the UK, the series was shown on the History Channel in April 2011 and on BBC Two and BBC HD in June 2011. Public response were generally positive.

Episode	Date shown	Viewers
Episode 1	June 17, 2011	2.64m (overnight)
Episode 2	June 17, 2011	2.36m (overnight)
Episode 3	June 24, 2011	1.35m (overnight)
Episode 4	July 1, 2011	1.32m (overnight)
Episode 5	July 1, 2011	1.25m (overnight)
Episode 6	July 8, 2011	1.41m (overnight)
Episode 7	July 8, 2011	1.41m (overnight)
Episode 8	July 15, 2011	.98m (overnight)

== Awards and nominations ==
Association	Category	Nominee	Result
63rd Primetime Emmy Awards	Outstanding Miniseries or Movie	Stephen Kronish, Jamie Paul Rock, David McKillop, Dirk Hoogstra, Joel Surnow, Brian Gibson, Jonathan Koch, Christine Shipton, Michael Prupas, Jon Cassar, Tara Ellis, and Steven Michaels	Nominated
63rd Primetime Emmy Awards	Outstanding Lead Actor in a Miniseries or Movie	Greg Kinnear	Nominated
63rd Primetime Emmy Awards	Outstanding Lead Actor in a Miniseries or Movie	Barry Pepper	Won
63rd Primetime Emmy Awards	Outstanding Supporting Actor in a Miniseries or Movie	Tom Wilkinson	Nominated
63rd Primetime Creative Arts Emmy Awards	Outstanding Hairstyling for a Miniseries or Movie	Judi Cooper-Sealy and Jenny Arbour	Won
63rd Primetime Creative Arts Emmy Awards	Outstanding Make-up for a Miniseries or Movie (Non-Prosthetic)	Jordan Samuel, Colin Penman, Linda Dowds, and Amanda Terry	Won
63rd Primetime Creative Arts Emmy Awards	Outstanding Sound Mixing for a Miniseries or Movie	Larold Rebhun, Frank Morrone, Henry Embry, and Stephen Traub for "Lancer and Lace"	Won
63rd Primetime Creative Arts Emmy Awards	Outstanding Art Direction for a Miniseries or Movie	Mun Ying Kwun, Rocco Matteo, and Enrico Campana	Nominated
63rd Primetime Creative Arts Emmy Awards	Outstanding Cinematography for a Miniseries or Movie	David Moxness for "Life Sentences"	Nominated
63rd Primetime Creative Arts Emmy Awards	Outstanding Main Title Theme Music	Sean Callery	Nominated
26th Gemini Awards	Best Dramatic Miniseries		Nominated
26th Gemini Awards	Best Achievement in Make-up	Jordan Samuel, Colin Penman, Linda Dowds, and Amanda Terry	Nominated
26th Gemini Awards	Best Costume Design		Nominated
26th Gemini Awards	Best Direction in a Dramatic Program or Miniseries	Jon Cassar	Nominated
26th Gemini Awards	Best Original Music Score for a Dramatic Program, Miniseries, or TV Movie	Sean Callery	Nominated
26th Gemini Awards	Best Performance by an Actress in a Supporting Role in a Dramatic Program or Miniseries	Diana Hardcastle	Won
26th Gemini Awards	Best Performance by an Actor in a Featured Leading Role in a Dramatic Program or Miniseries	Barry Pepper	Won
26th Gemini Awards	Best Photography in a Dramatic Program or Series		Won
26th Gemini Awards	Best Production Design in a Fiction Program or Series	Mun Ying Kwun, Rocco Matteo, and Enrico Campana	Nominated
26th Gemini Awards	Best Sound in a Dramatic Program	Larold Rebhun, Frank Morrone, Henry Embry, and Stephen Traub	Nominated
18th Screen Actors Guild Awards	Outstanding Performance by a Male Actor in a Television Movie or Miniseries	Greg Kinnear	Nominated
23rd Producers Guild of America Awards	Television Producer of the Year Award in Long-Form	Stephen Kronish, Jamie Paul Rock, David McKillop, Dirk Hoogstra, Joel Surnow, Brian Gibson, Jonathan Koch, Christine Shipton, Michael Prupas, Jon Cassar, Tara Ellis, and Steven Michaels	Nominated
64th Directors Guild of America Awards	Outstanding Directing – Television Film	Jon Cassar	Won
History Makers Awards	Best Historical Drama Production		Won

== Home media ==
The Kennedys was released on DVD in the UK on July 18, 2011, and in the US and Canada on September 20, 2011.

As of October 2011, The Kennedys was available as an app, digital download on iTunes and on Netflix's streaming media service. As of December 2025, it is available to stream on Tubi, Amazon Prime, and Pluto TV.

== Sequel miniseries ==
Holmes reprised her role in The Kennedys: After Camelot, a four-part sequel released on April 2, 2017. She was also executive producer of the miniseries and directed an episode, with Jon Cassar returning to direct the remaining three episodes.

== See also ==
- Kennedy (miniseries)
- Prince Jack
- Hoover vs. The Kennedys
- Young Joe, the Forgotten Kennedy
- Civil rights movement in popular culture
- Cultural depictions of John F. Kennedy
- Cultural depictions of Jacqueline Kennedy Onassis
- Robert F. Kennedy in media
