= The Kennedys: After Camelot =

2017 American television drama miniseries

- Genre: Drama; Historical fiction
- Starring: Katie Holmes; Matthew Perry; Alexander Siddig
- Countries of origin: United States; Canada
- Original language: English
- No. of episodes: 2 (4)

Production
- Executive producers: Michael Prupas; Keri Selig; Stan E. Hubbard; Jon Cassar; J. Randy Taraborrelli; Stephen Kronish; Jonathan Koch; Steve Michaels; Katie Holmes; Matthew Perry; Kevin Lafferty; Irene Litinsky; Evan Tussman
- Producer: Kevin Lafferty
- Cinematography: David Moxness
- Editors: Christopher Donaldson; Ben Wilkinson
- Running time: 90 minutes per episode (two-episode version); 45 minutes per episode (four-episode version)
- Production companies: Muse Entertainment; Intuition Productions; Three Pot Productions

Original release
- Network: Reelz
- Release: April 2 – April 9, 2017

Related
- The Kennedys

The Kennedys: After Camelot (also known as The Kennedys: Decline and Fall) is a 2017 American television drama miniseries based on the 2012 book After Camelot: A Personal History of the Kennedy Family 1968 to the Present by J. Randy Taraborrelli as a follow-up to the 2011 miniseries The Kennedys. Katie Holmes reprised her role as Jacqueline Kennedy Onassis, while Matthew Perry, in his final television role, played Ted Kennedy, Alexander Siddig appeared as Aristotle Onassis and Kristen Hager as Joan Bennett Kennedy, Ted's wife. The two-part miniseries aired on Reelz on April 2, 2017, and April 9, 2017.

== Cast ==
- Katie Holmes as Jacqueline Kennedy Onassis
- Matthew Perry as Ted Kennedy
- Diana Hardcastle as Rose Kennedy
- Kristen Hager as Joan Bennett Kennedy
- Kristin Booth as Ethel Kennedy
- Alexander Siddig as Aristotle Onassis
- Erin Agostino as Christina Onassis
- Chris Kapeleris as Alexander Onassis
- Barry Pepper as Robert F. Kennedy
- Ava Preston as Caroline Kennedy
- Brett Donahue as John F. Kennedy Jr.
- Tom Wilkinson as Joseph P. Kennedy Sr.
- Erica Cox as Carolyn Bessette-Kennedy

== Episodes ==
No.	Title	Directed by	Written by	Original release date	US viewers (millions)
1	"Family Bonds"	Jon Cassar	Stephen Kronish	April 2, 2017	0.746
2	"New Beginnings"	Katie Holmes & Jon Cassar	Sandra Chwialkowska & Stephen Kronish	April 9, 2017	0.739
