= Sigolène Vinson =

French lawyer, actress and writer

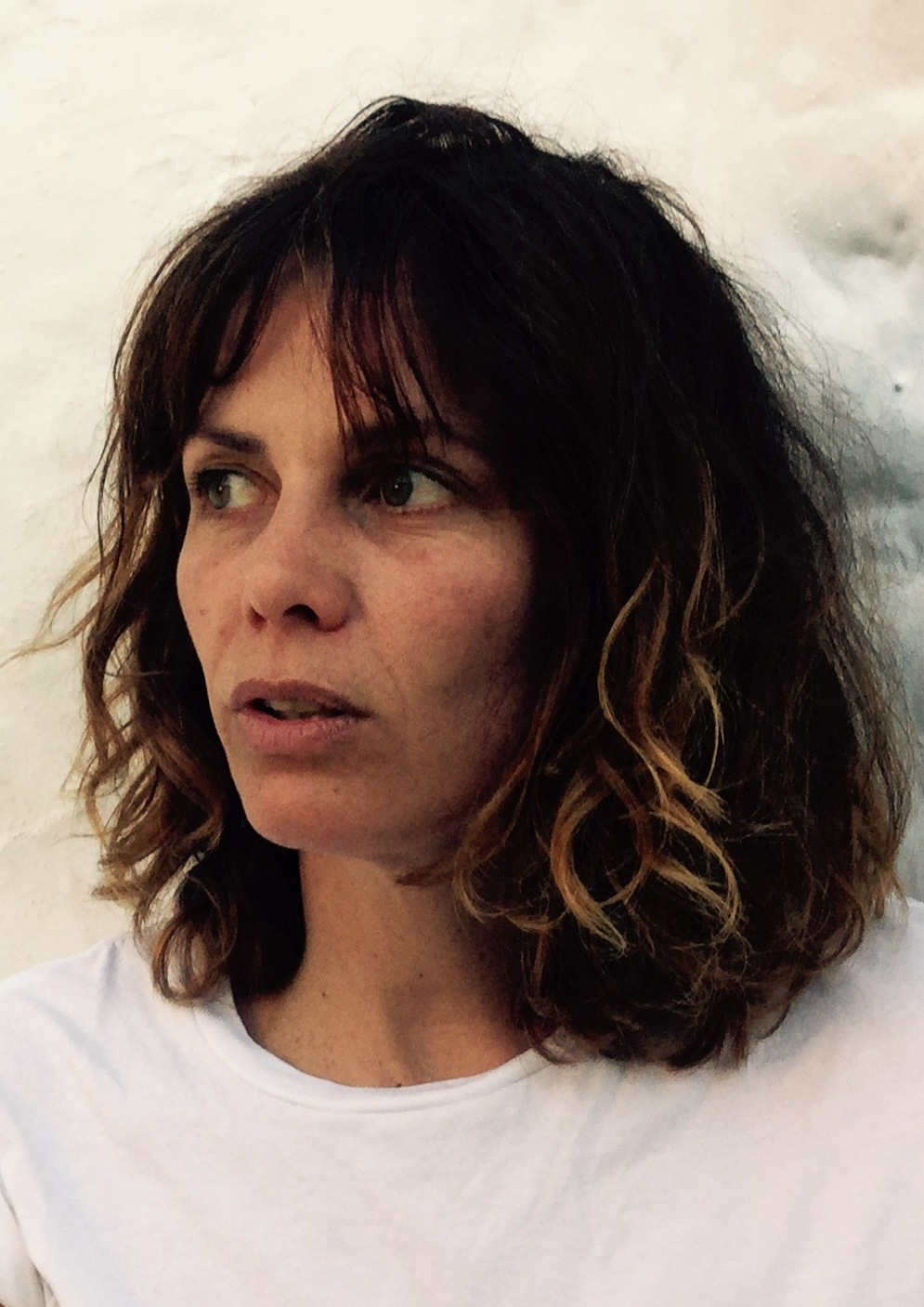
Sigolène Vinson, 2016

Sigolène Vinson (born 1974) is a French former lawyer and actress who became a novelist and journalist. She is the legal correspondent of Charlie Hebdo, where she survived the shooting on 7 January 2015.

== Life ==
Vinson was born at Sainte-Foy-lès-Lyon. Her family moved shortly afterwards to Clamart and then Meudon near Paris, before leaving for Djibouti because of her father's job in 1981. She returned to France in 1987. She studied for the stage but later retrained at the Sorbonne to become a lawyer.

In 2007 she gave up the law to become a writer. In the same year she was awarded jointly with Philippe Kleinmann the Prix du roman d'aventures for their crime novel Bistouri Blues, the first appearance of the commissaire Cush Dibbeth, who reappeared in Substance (2015). In 2011 they co-wrote an historical crime novel, Double Hélice. In the same year Vinson's solo novel J'ai déserté le pays de l’enfance was also published.

Since September 2012 she has written a legal column for Charlie Hebdo. During the shooting on 7 January 2015 her life was spared by Saïd Kouachi, because she was a woman, on condition that she read the Quran.

== Works ==
=== Novels ===
- J'ai déserté le pays de l'enfance, Paris, Plon, 2011 ISBN 978-2-259-21446-9
- Le Caillou, Paris, Le Tripode, 2015 ISBN 978-2-370-55055-2
- Courir après les ombres, Paris, Plon, 2015 ISBN 978-2-259-22957-9
- Les Jouisseurs, Paris, Éditions de l'Observatoire, 2017 ISBN 979-10-329-0043-7
- Maritima, Paris, Éditions de l'Observatoire, 2019 ISBN 979-10-329-0444-2
- La Canine de George, Paris, Éditions de l'Observatoire, 2021 ISBN 979-10-329-1613-1

=== In collaboration with Philippe Kleinmann ===
- Bistouri Blues, Paris, Éditions du Masque, Collection Le Masque No 2507, 2007 ISBN 978-2-7024-3322-5 ; reissued, Paris, Éditions du Masque, Collection Masque poche No 57, 2015 ISBN 978-2-7024-4171-8
- Double Hélice, Paris, Éditions du Masque, 2011 ISBN 978-2-7024-3580-9
- Substance, Paris, Éditions du Masque, 2015 ISBN 978-2-7024-4167-1

=== Contributions to works of multiple authorship ===
- Les Aventures du Concierge Masqué - L'Exquise Nouvelle saison 3, L'exquise Édition, 2013
- Enfant, je me souviens, UNICEF/Livre de poche, 2016
