= Bernard Maris =

French economist, writer and journalist (1946–2015)

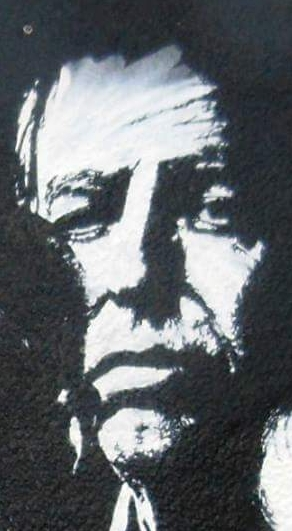
- Maris in 2015
- Born: 23 September 1946; Toulouse, France
- Died: 7 January 2015 (aged 68); Paris, France
- Occupations: Economist, writer, journalist

Bernard Henri Maris (French: [maʁis]; 23 September 1946 – 7 January 2015), also known as "Oncle Bernard", was a French economist, writer and journalist who was also a shareholder in Charlie Hebdo magazine. He was murdered on 7 January 2015, during the shooting at the headquarters of the magazine in Paris.

== Biography ==
=== Studies and academic career ===
After graduating from Sciences Po Toulouse in 1968, Bernard Maris earned a doctorate in economics at the University of Toulouse I in 1975 with a thesis entitled La distribution personnelle des revenus: une approche théorique dans le cadre de la croissance équilibrée ("The personal distribution of income: A theoretical approach to balanced growth"), prepared under the direction of Jean Vincens. He taught as an assistant professor then from 1984 on as a senior lecturer at the University of Toulouse I. In September 1994 he earned his full professorship (Professeur des Universités) through the Agrégation d'Économie Générale (a competitive examination on the subject of General Economic Science) at the Institut d'Études Politiques [Institute of Political Science] in Toulouse.

At the time of his death, he was a professor at the Institute of European studies of the University of Paris-VIII. He also taught microeconomics at the University of Iowa in the United States and the Central Bank of Peru.

=== Journalism ===
Bernard Maris wrote for various journals: Marianne, Le Nouvel Observateur, Le Figaro Magazine, Le Monde and Charlie Hebdo, in which he used the pen name "Oncle Bernard". At Charlie Hebdo, he was the Deputy Editorial Director until 2008. As its founder, during the rebirth of the title in 1992, he was an 11% shareholder.

On the radio, Bernard Maris had a weekly column entitled J'ai tout compris à l'économie, each Saturday on France Inter, and took part each Friday in a debate on topical economic issues with the economic journalist of Les Échos, Dominique Seux, from 7:50.

He also presented on television, on the i-Télé channel, where he participated as a columnist in Y'a pas que le CAC. There he commented with another professor of Economics, Philippe Chalmin (close to the neoclassical school), on the economic news until June 2009. He also regularly appeared on the programme C dans l'air on France 5.

=== Associations and political life ===
Bernard Maris was often presented as alter-globalization, because of his earlier participation with the Scientific Council of ATTAC Association for the Taxation of Financial Transactions and for Citizens' Action.

He lived in the 16th arrondissement of Paris, and was a candidate in 2002 at the city-council elections of the 10th arrondissement of Paris for The Greens. He was also a candidate for the CFDT in the 2009 elections for the Commission de la carte d'identité des journalistes professionnels.

=== Novelist ===
Bernard Maris published several novels including L'enfant qui voulait être muet, and was awarded the Leclerc's booksellers award in 2003.

=== Family ===
He was married to Sylvie Genevoix, a journalist and a former member of the CSA, who died on 20 September 2012. She was Maurice Genevoix's daughter.

=== Freemasonry ===
Bernard Maris was initiated at Roger Leray lodge in Paris (Grand Orient de France) in 2008.

=== Death ===
Maris was killed, along with seven of his colleagues, two police officers, and two others on 7 January 2015 in the Charlie Hebdo shooting when gunmen stormed the Charlie Hebdo newspaper offices in Paris.

== Work in economics ==
Maris was a great admirer of John Maynard Keynes, to whom he dedicated a book, Keynes ou l'économiste citoyen, and has published many popular economic books. He is known, amongst others, by titles such as Ah Dieu! Que la guerre économique est jolie! (1998), Lettre ouverte aux gourous de l'économie qui nous prennent pour des imbéciles (1999) and La Bourse ou la vie (2000).

With incisive style, he tried to explain the nature and the interests of the real economy, unveiling its negative aspects, but also highlighting concepts and alternatives such as the gratuity, the gift economy and basic income, which were, in his eyes, of significance.

Le Nouvel Économiste magazine assigned him the title of "Best Economist of the Year", in 1995.

=== Bank of France ===
On 21 December 2011, Jean-Pierre Bel, president of the Senate, appointed him a member of the General Council of the Banque de France.

== Publications ==
=== Economics ===
- Éléments de politique économique: l'expérience française de 1945 à 1984 [Elements of economic policy: The French experience of 1945 to 1984] (in French). 1985.
- Des économistes au-dessus de tout soupçon ou la grande mascarade des prédictions [Economists above any suspicion, or the great farce of predictions] (in French). 1990.
- Les Sept Péchés capitaux des universitaires [The seven deadly sins of academics] (in French). 1991.
- Jacques Delors, artiste et martyr [Jacques Delors, artist and martyr] (in French). 1993.
- Parlant pognon mon petit [Speaking my little dough] (in French). 1994.
- Maris, Bernard; Labarde, Philippe (1998). Ah Dieu! Que la guerre économique est jolie! [Ah God! The economic war is pretty!] (in French). Albin Michel. ISBN 2-226-09574-8.
- Keynes ou l'économiste citoyen [Keynes or citizen Economist] (in French). 1999.
- Lettre ouverte aux gourous de l'économie qui nous prennent pour des imbéciles [Open letter to the gurus of the economy taking us for fools] (in French). 1999.
- Maris, Bernard; Labarde, Philippe (2000). La Bourse ou la vie – La grande manipulation des petits actionnaires [Your stock market or your life – The great manipulation of small shareholders] (in French).
- Maris, Bernard; Labarde, Philippe (2002). Malheur aux vaincus: Ah, si les riches pouvaient rester entre riches [Woe to the vanquished: Ah, if the rich could remain amongst the rich] (in French). Albin Michel. ISBN 2-226-13146-9.
- Antimanuel d'économie: Tome 1, les fourmis [Antimanual of Economics: Volume 1, the ants] (in French). Bréal. 2003. ISBN 2-7495-0078-8.
- Antimanuel d'économie: Tome 2, les cigales [Antimanual of Economics: Volume 2, the cicadas] (in French). Bréal. 2006. ISBN 2-7495-0629-8.
- Maris, Bernard; Leyla, Dakhli; Sue, Roger; Vigarello, Georges (2007). Gouverner par la peur [Rule by fear] (in French). Fayard. ISBN 978-2-213-63287-2.
- Maris, Bernard (2008). Petits principes de langue de bois économique [Small principles of economic jargon] (in French). Bréal. ISBN 9782749501499.
- Maris, Bernard; Dostaler, Gilles (2009). Capitalisme et pulsion de mort [Capitalism and death drive] (in French). Albin Michel. ISBN 978-2-226-18699-7.
- Marx, ô Marx, pourquoi m'as-tu abandonné? [Marx, o Marx, why have you forsaken me?] (in French). Éditions Les Échappés. 2010. ISBN 978-2-35766-022-9.
- Plaidoyer (impossible) pour les socialistes [(Impossible) advocacy for the Socialists] (in French). Albin Michel. 2012. ISBN 978-2226240200.

=== Analyses ===
- L'Homme dans la guerre. Maurice Genevoix face à Ernst Jünger [The man in the war. Maurice Genevoix against Ernst Jünger] (in French). Grasset. 2013. ISBN 978-2-246-80338-6.
- Houellebecq économiste [Houellebecq Economist] (in French). Flammarion. 2014. ISBN 9782081296077.

=== Novels ===
- Pertinentes Questions morales et sexuelles dans le Dakota du Nord [Relevant moral and sexual issues in North Dakota] (in French). Albin Michel. 1995.
- L'Enfant qui voulait être muet [The child who wanted to be mute] (in French). 2003.
- Maris, Bernard (2005). Le Journal [The Journal] (in French). Albin Michel. ISBN 2-226-15393-4.

== Filmography ==
- 2008: Encirclement by Richard Brouillette
- 2010: Film Socialisme by Jean-Luc Godard

== Honors and awards ==
Chevalier of the Order of Legion of Honour

== See also ==
- List of journalists killed in Europe
