= Running =

Method of terrestrial locomotion allowing rapid movement on foot

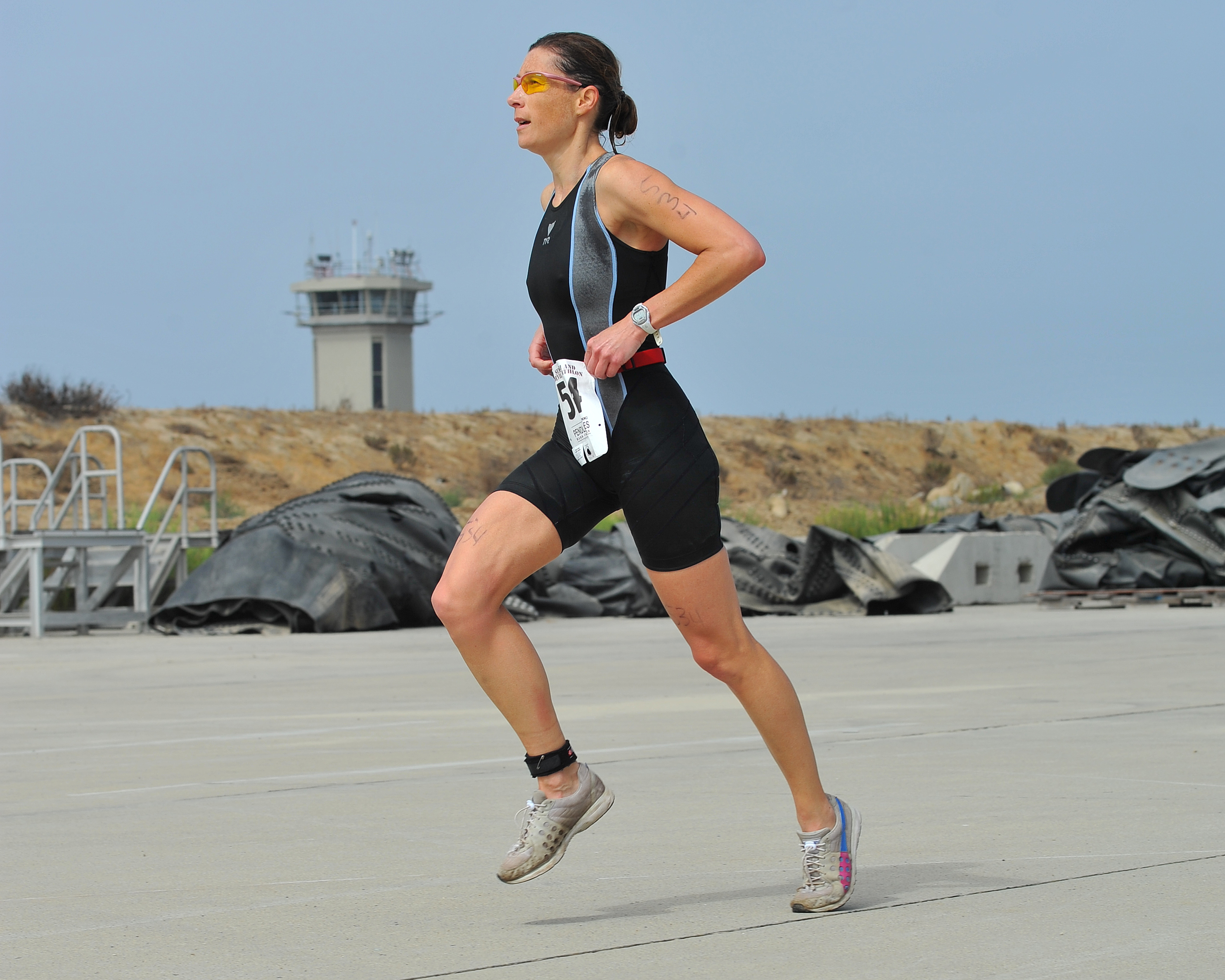
A woman running in a triathlon.

Video of human running action

Running is a method of terrestrial locomotion by which humans and other animals move quickly on foot. Running has an aerial phase in which both, or all, feet are above the ground at some stage (though there are exceptions). This is in contrast to walking, a slower form of movement where at least one foot is always in contact with the ground. The term "running" can refer to a variety of speeds ranging from jogging to sprinting. All forms involve the same basic stages of a main propulsion phase, where the person drives forward the hardest leading with one leg; a foot placement phase where they place their foot, absorb any impact and stabilise themselves- they regain their sense of balance and recover energy; they then start a new propulsion phase, this time with the other leg. This sequence continues as part of a flow of actions which form a pattern of steps called a gait. Running has been described as the world's most accessible sport.

In sports science, the analysis of running can involve the categoristation of a person's gait into numerous different phases and identify multiple involved factors. For example, from the viewpoint of spring-mass mechanics changes in kinetic and potential energy within a running stride co-occur, with energy storage accomplished by springy tendons and passive muscle elasticity.

Running in humans is associated with improved health and life expectancy. Competitive running grew out of religious festivals in various areas. Records of competitive racing date back to the Tailteann Games in Ireland between 1171 BCE and 632 BCE, while the first recorded Olympic Games took place in 776 BCE. It is hypothesized that the ancestors of humankind developed the ability to run for long distances about 2.6 million years ago, probably to hunt animals.

== History ==
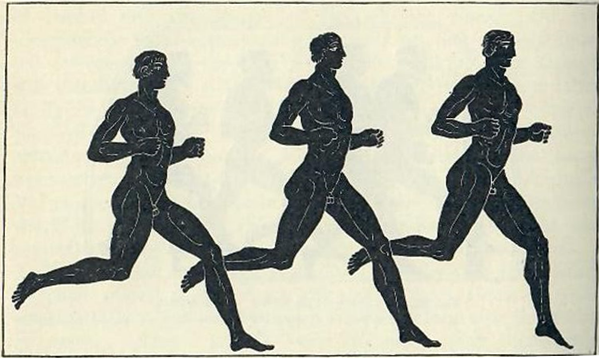
An early 20th Century drawing depicting long-distance runners. It is copied from a Panathenaic amphora from Ancient Greece, circa 333 BCE

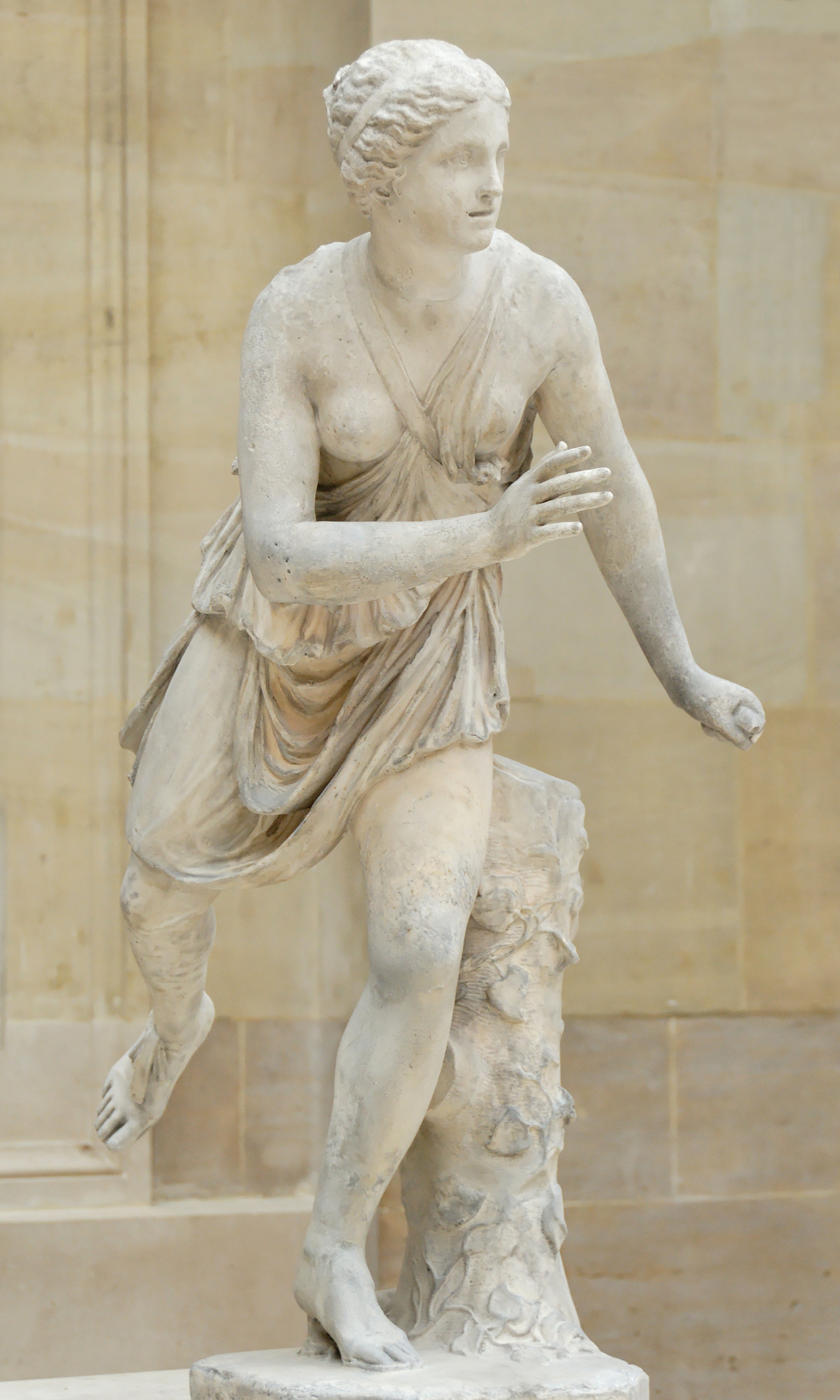
A statue of Atalanta the mythical runner who could not be beaten in a race. Produced circa 1703-1705, this statue is a copy of a Roman statue which itself was copied from a Hellenistic original.

It is thought that human running evolved at least four and a half million years ago out of the ability of the ape-like Australopithecus, an early ancestor of humans, to walk upright on two legs.

Early humans most likely developed into endurance runners from the practice of persistence hunting of animals, the activity of following and chasing until a prey is too exhausted to flee, succumbing to "chase myopathy", and that human features such as the nuchal ligament, abundant sweat glands, the Achilles tendons, big knee joints and muscular glutei maximi, were changes caused by this type of activity. The theory as first proposed used comparative physiological evidence and the natural habits of animals when running, indicating the likelihood of this activity as a successful hunting method. Further evidence from observation of modern-day hunting practices also indicated this likelihood. Scientific investigation of the Nariokotome skeleton provided further evidence for the Carrier theory.

Competitive running grew out of religious festivals in various areas such as Greece, Egypt, Asia, and the East African Rift in Africa. The Tailteann Games, an Irish sporting festival in honor of the goddess Tailtiu, dates back to 1829 BCE and is one of the earliest records of competitive running. The origins of the Olympics and Marathon running are shrouded by myth and legend, though the first recorded games took place in 776 BCE. Running in Ancient Greece can be traced back to these games of 776 BCE.

...I suspect that the sun, moon, earth, stars, and heaven, which are still the gods of many barbarians, were the only gods known to the aboriginal Hellenes. Seeing that they were always moving and running, from their running nature they were called gods or runners (Thus, Theontas)...

— Socrates in Plato – Cratylus

The culture of running was not limited to men in Ancient Greece and is demonstrated by the mythical Atalanta. Her suitors were required to beat her in a race or forfeit their lives. As she was unbeatable, all failed except for Hippomenes who was aided by the goddess Venus (Aphrodite). He distracted Atalanta during the race by throwing golden apples, given to him by Venus, which she stooped to pick up. The details of the event illuminate the running technique which was considered effective in the contemporary culture. In Metamorphoses the Roman writer Ovid gives Venus's spoken account of the start of the race:

The trumpet sounded the start: The pair, each crouching low, shot forward, skimming the sand with flying feet, so lightly they could run on waves and never wet their sandals, they could run on fields of grain and never bend them. He heard them cheering: Go Hippomenes, lean to the work, use all your strength: go, go, you are sure to win!

Such involvement of women in running found concrete representation in the Heraean Games. These were a series of events which took place immediately before the Ancient Olympic Games and which only women could compete in. Writing in the early 20th Century, the historian E. Norman Gardinier states:

At the festival there were races for maidens of various ages. Their course was 500 feet, or one-sixth less than the men's stadium. The maidens ran with their hair down their backs, a short tunic reaching just below the knee, and their right shoulder bare to the breast. The victors received crowns of olive and a share of the heifer sacrificed to Hera. They had, too, the right of setting up their statues in the Heraeum.

== Description ==
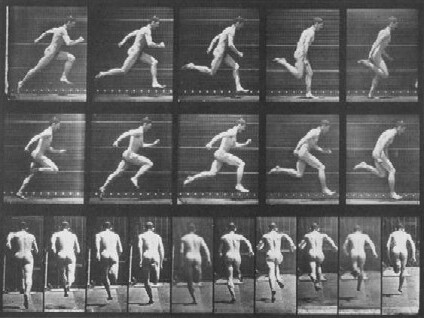
Eadweard Muybridge photo sequence

Running gait can be divided into two phases regarding the lower extremity: stance and swing. These can be further divided into absorption, propulsion, initial swing, and terminal swing. Due to the continuous nature of running gait, no certain point is assumed to be the beginning. However, for simplicity, it will be assumed that footstrike and shock absorption mark the beginning of the running cycle in a body already in motion.

Whilst the phases are distinct in their own right, it can be difficult to ascertain where one ends and another begins. It is commonly considered that there is an amount of overlap between some phases and that they occur concurrently, with their identification often being based on an emphasis of focus rather than an exclusivity of occurrence.

=== Footstrike ===
Footstrike occurs when the bottom (plantar portion) of the foot makes initial contact with the ground after the float phase when both feet were off the ground. Common footstrikes include forefoot, midfoot, and heel strike types. These are characterized by initial contact of the ball of the foot, ball and heel of the foot simultaneously and heel of the foot respectively. During this time, the hip joint is undergoing extension from being in maximal flexion from the previous swing phase. For proper force absorption, the knee joint should be flexed upon the footstrike, and the ankle should be slightly in front of the body. Footstrike begins the shock absorption phase as the forces from the initial contact are attenuated throughout the lower extremity. The runner ensures that their foot is securely placed and they are stable whilst continuing to move dynamically. Absorption of forces continues as the body moves from footstrike to midstance.

=== Midstance ===
Midstance is when the leg in contact with the ground is in knee flexion directly underneath the trunk, pelvis, and hips. At this point, and during footstrike, the runner regains their sense of balance as fully as possible after the preceding float phase when both feet were momentarily off the ground. As this is a less intense phase energy wise than the propulsion phase they also seek to recover energy in a process known as active recovery. The propulsion phase begins to occur as the hips undergo hip extension, the knee joint undergoes extension, and the ankle undergoes plantar flexion. Propulsion continues until the leg is extended behind the body and toe-off occurs. This involves a maximal hip extension, knee extension, and plantar flexion for the subject, resulting in the body being pushed forward from this motion, and the foot leaves the ground as the initial swing begins.

=== Propulsion phase ===
The propulsion phase, which occurs from midstance to toe-off, is crucial for understanding how the body moves forward. In basic terms, it involves thrusting forwards with the lead leg while the rear leg extends. When the lead leg moves downwards to place the lead foot and the rear foot is lifted from the ground is when the propulsion phase ends. The thrusting action of the torso is also important in understanding how propulsion is generated.

Considered in more detail, in a full stride length model, elements of both the terminal swing and footstrike contribute to propulsion. The setup for propulsion begins at the end of the terminal swing when the hip joint flexes, allowing the hip extensors to generate force as they accelerate through the maximal range of motion.

As the hip extensors transition from inhibitory to primary muscle movers, the lower extremity moves back towards the ground, aided by the stretch reflex and gravity. The footstrike and absorption phases follow, leading to two possible outcomes.

With a heel strike, this phase may be just a continuation of momentum from the stretch reflex, gravity, and light hip extension, offering little force absorption through the ankle joint. On the other hand, a mid/forefoot strike helps in shock absorption, supporting plantar flexion from midstance to toe-off.

The actual propulsion begins when the lower extremity enters midstance. The hip extensors continue contracting, assisted by gravity and the stretch reflex from maximal hip flexion during the terminal swing. Hip extension pulls the ground underneath the body, propelling the runner forward.

During midstance, the knee should be slightly flexed due to elastic loading from the absorption and footstrike phases, preserving forward momentum. The ankle joint is in dorsiflexion at this point, either elastically loaded from a mid/forefoot strike or preparing for stand-alone concentric plantar flexion.

The final propulsive movements during toe-off involve all three joints: ankle, knee, and hip. The plantar flexors push off from the ground, returning from dorsiflexion in midstance. This can occur either by releasing the elastic load from an earlier mid/forefoot strike or through concentric contraction from a heel strike.

With a forefoot strike, the ankle and knee joints release their stored elastic energy from the footstrike/absorption phase. The quadriceps group/knee extensors fully extend the knee, pushing the body off the ground. Simultaneously, the knee flexors and stretch reflex pull the knee back into flexion, initiating the initial swing phase. The hip extensors extend to the maximum, contributing to forces pulling and pushing off the ground, as well as initiating knee flexion and the initial swing phase.

=== Swing phase ===
Initial swing is the response of both stretch reflexes and concentric movements to the propulsion movements of the body. Hip flexion and knee flexion occur, beginning the return of the limb to the starting position and setting up for another foot strike. The initial swing ends at midswing when the limb is again directly underneath the trunk, pelvis, and hip with the knee joint flexed and hip flexion continuing. Terminal swing then begins as hip flexion continues to the point of activation of the stretch reflex of the hip extensors. The knee begins to extend slightly as it swings to the anterior portion of the body. The foot then makes contact with the ground with a foot strike, completing the running cycle of one side of the lower extremity. Each limb of the lower extremity works opposite to the other. When one side is in toe-off/propulsion, the other hand is in the swing/recovery phase preparing for footstrike. Following toe-off and the beginning of the initial swing of one side, there is a flight phase where neither extremity is in contact with the ground due to the opposite side finishing terminal swing. As the footstrike of the one hand occurs, the initial swing continues. The opposing limbs meet with one in midstance and midswing, beginning the propulsion and terminal swing phases.

=== Upper extremity function ===
Video of man running

The upper extremity function serves mainly in providing balance in conjunction with the opposing side of the lower extremity. The movement of each leg is paired with the opposite arm, which serves to counterbalance the body, particularly during the stance phase. The arms move most effectively (as seen in elite athletes) with the elbow joint at approximately 90 degrees or less, the hands swinging from the hips up to mid-chest level with the opposite leg, the Humerus moving from being parallel with the trunk to approximately 45 degrees shoulder extension (never passing the trunk in flexion) and with as little movement in the transverse plane as possible. The trunk also rotates in conjunction with arm swing. It mainly serves as a balance point from which the limbs are anchored. Thus trunk motion should remain mostly stable with little motion except for slight rotation, as excessive movement would contribute to transverse motion and wasted energy.

=== Footstrike debate ===
Recent research into various forms of running has focused on the differences in the potential injury risks and shock absorption capabilities between heel and mid/forefoot footstrikes. It has been shown that heel striking is generally associated with higher rates of injury and impact due to inefficient shock absorption and inefficient biomechanical compensations for these forces. This is due to pressures from a heel strike traveling through bones for shock absorption rather than being absorbed by muscles. Since bones cannot disperse forces easily, the forces are transmitted to other parts of the body, including ligaments, joints, and bones in the rest of the lower extremities up to the lower back. This causes the body to use abnormal compensatory motions in an attempt to avoid serious bone injuries. These compensations include internal rotation of the tibia, knee, and hip joints. Excessive compensation over time has been linked to a higher risk of injuries in those joints and the muscles involved in those motions. Conversely, a mid/forefoot strike has been associated with greater efficiency and lower injury risk due to the triceps surae being used as a lever system to absorb forces with the muscles eccentrically rather than through the bone. Landing with a mid/forefoot strike has also been shown to properly attenuate shock and allow the triceps surae to aid in propulsion via reflexive plantarflexion after stretching to absorb ground contact forces. Thus a mid/forefoot strike may aid in propulsion. However, even among elite athletes, there are variations in self-selected footstrike types. This is especially true in longer distance events, where there is a prevalence of heel strikers. There does tend however to be a greater percentage of mid/forefoot striking runners in the elite fields, particularly in the faster racers and the winning individuals or groups. While one could attribute the faster speeds of elite runners compared to recreational runners with similar footstrikes to physiological differences, the hip, and joints have been left out of the equation for proper propulsion. This raises the question of how heel-striking elite distance runners can keep up such high paces with a supposedly inefficient and injurious foot strike technique.

=== Stride length, hip and knee function ===
Biomechanical factors associated with elite runners include increased hip function, use, and stride length over recreational runners. An increase in running speeds causes increased ground reaction forces, and elite distance runners must compensate for this to maintain their pace over long distances. These forces are attenuated through increased stride length via increased hip flexion and extension through decreased ground contact time and more energy being used in propulsion. With increased propulsion in the horizontal plane, less impact occurs from the decreased force in the vertical plane. Increased hip flexion allows for increased use of the hip extensors through midstance and toe-off, allowing for more force production. The difference even between world-class and national-level 1500-m runners has been associated with more efficient hip joint function. The increase in velocity likely comes from the increased range of motion in hip flexion and extension, allowing for greater acceleration and speed. The hip extensors and extension have been linked to more powerful knee extension during toe-off, contributing to propulsion. Stride length must be appropriately increased with some degree of knee flexion maintained through the terminal swing phases, as excessive knee extension during this phase along with footstrike has been associated with higher impact forces due to braking and an increased prevalence of heel striking. Elite runners tend to exhibit some degree of knee flexion at footstrike and midstance, which first serves to eccentrically absorb impact forces in the quadriceps muscle group. Secondly it allows for the knee joint to contract concentrically and provides significant aid in propulsion during toe-off as the quadriceps group is capable of producing large amounts of force. Recreational runners have been shown to increase stride length through increased knee extension rather than increased hip flexion, as exhibited by elite runners, which provides an intense braking motion with each step and decreases the rate and efficiency of knee extension during toe-off, slowing down speed. Knee extension, however, contributes to additional stride length and propulsion during toe-off and is seen more frequently in elite runners as well.

== Good technique ==
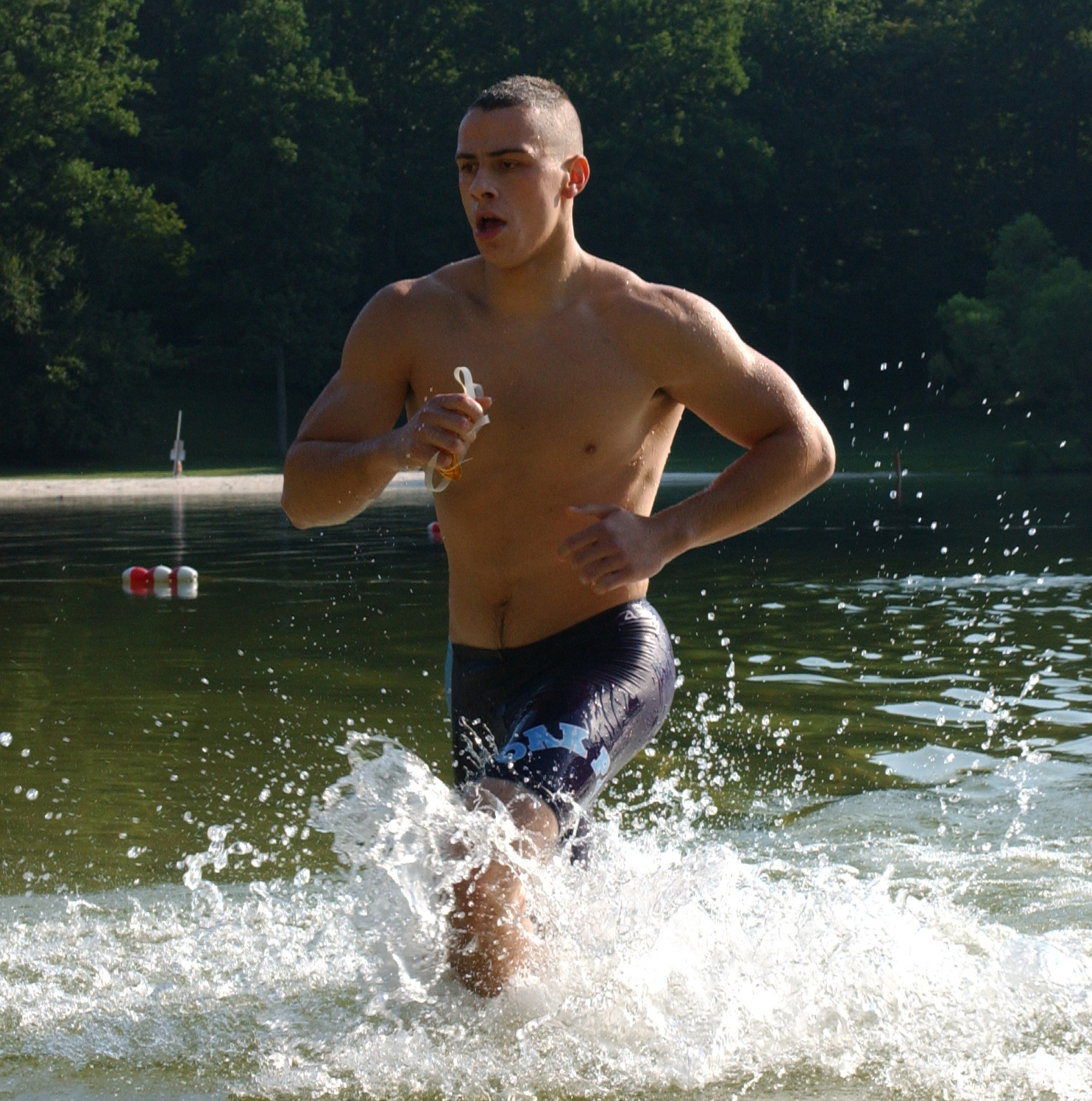
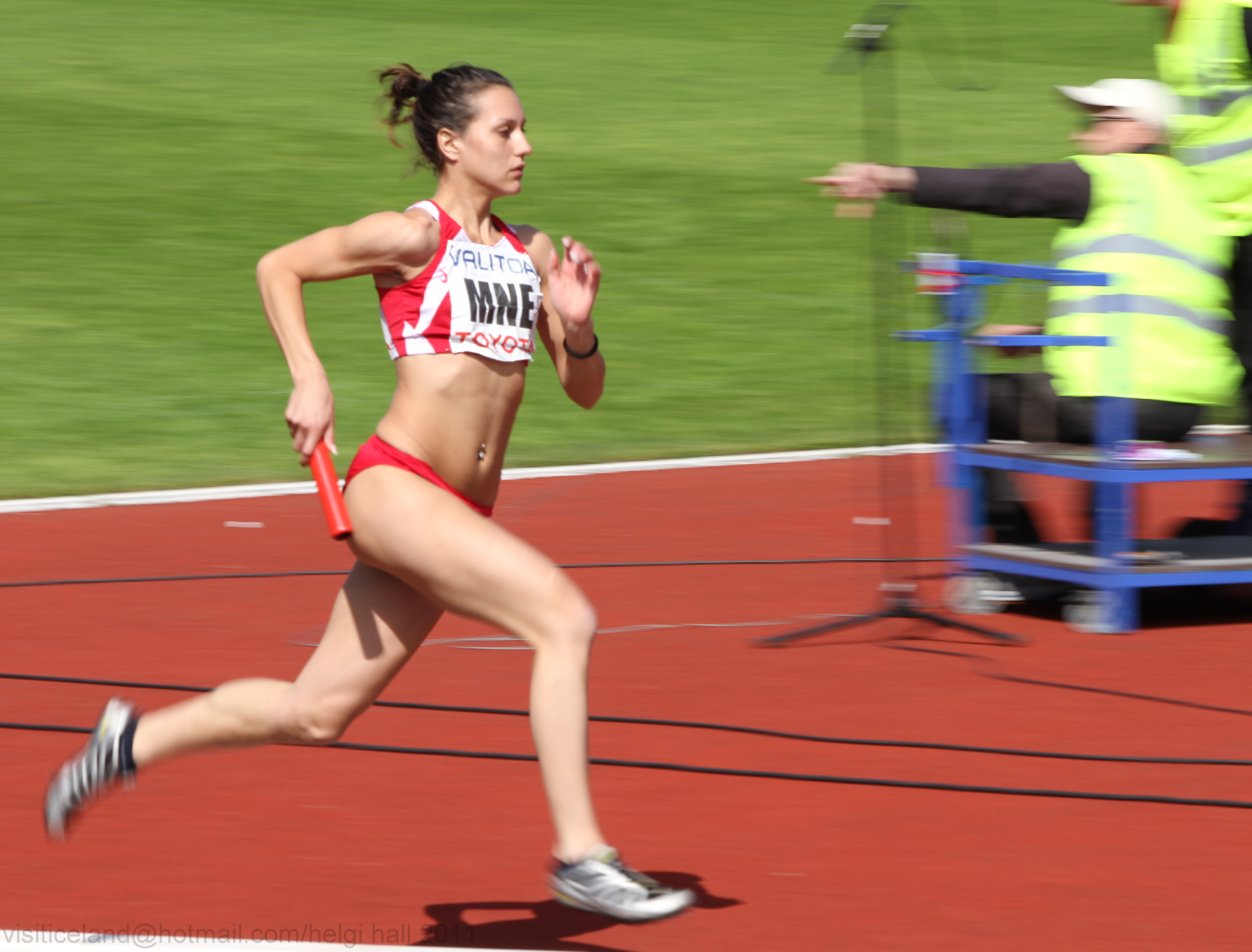
The runner's posture should be upright and slightly tilted forward.

=== Upright posture and slight forward lean ===
Leaning forward places a runner's center of mass over the front part of the foot, which avoids landing on the heel and facilitates the use of the spring mechanism of the foot. Additionally, it facilitates avoiding the braking effect that occurs when a runner lands their foot in front of the center of mass. Although maintaining an upright posture is crucial, runners should also keep their frame relaxed and engage their core to keep their posture stable. This helps prevent injury as long as the body is neither rigid nor tense. The most common running mistakes are tilting the chin up and scrunching shoulders.

=== Stride rate and types ===
During running, the speed (in miles per minute or kilometers per minute) at which the runner moves may be calculated by multiplying the cadence (steps per minute) by the stride length (in miles or kilometers). Running is often measured in terms of pace, a measure of slowness expressed in units of minutes per mile or minutes per kilometer. Some coaches advocate training at a combination of specific paces related to one's fitness to stimulate various physiological improvements.

=== Left and right balance ===
It is common for a runner to have an asymmetric gait pattern which has a dominant side. The leg on this side applies slightly more power than the other leg and has a slightly longer stride length. However, if the dominant leg is excessively stronger than the non-dominant leg, which is excessively weaker, then this can lead to problems with the person's running technique, reduce efficiency, and increase the risk of injury. It can therefore be advantageous to even up the strength of the legs in order to achieve a more balanced gait overall.

This may be achieved in several ways. The gait can be altered so that the non-dominant leg is used as the dominant leg for a period of time i.e. by making its stride length slightly longer than that of the other leg and by applying the additional power needed to achieve this. The gait can then be periodically alternated so that both legs are used alternatively as the dominant leg. For example, during a run the left leg is used as the dominant leg with a slightly longer stride length than the right. Then, after a period of time, there is a change so that the right leg is used as the dominant leg with a slightly longer stride length than the left. And so forth in a pattern of alternation. This more even use of the legs overall means that any strength imbalances that have developed are reduced. This can also be achieved by running around in a circle, first in one direction and then in the other. This is standardly practiced by runners who use oval running tracks. For example, when running anti-clockwise the inside left stride is shorter and the outside right stride is longer. In order to prevent a large muscle imbalance developing, runners also practice running clockwise so that, conversely, the right inside stride length is shorter and the left longer. This develops both the left and right sides more evenly. Exercises which work the legs in a unilateral manner are also used. Using the legs one at a time, with the same range of movement for each, helps to ensure a more even strength ratio existing between them. For example, doing one legged squats on the left leg, before switching to do them on the right leg, ensures each leg performs the same amount of work and thereby evens up their strength levels. Standardly, higher performance runners have more of an even balance between the relative strengths of their legs.

=== Balance and recovery ===
Dynamic balance is fundamentally important to good running technique. During the footstrike phase it allows for the faster establishment of a stable base of support and increased levels of overall stability. During the midstance phase, the regaining of balance continues and also allows for the greater recovery of energy. These are essential for the subsequent propulsion phase to be performed in an efficient manner. Throughout a run, a good sense of balance helps to ensure better running economy meaning that energy is more effectively used and recovered overall.

A person can develop a better sense of balance for running by performing balance exercises which transfer to their running ability. For example, a one legged squat exercise, where the raised leg is positioned behind, is an action with a similar range of movement to the midstance phase. Practicing it means that balance can be regained and maintained more easily during a gait cycle. A better sense of balance for running can also be gained in combination with the improvement of other factors related to running. For example, a person can balance on one bent leg while looking around themselves in order to additionally improve the flexibility and stability of their neck.

== Health benefits ==
=== Cardiovascular ===
While there exists the potential for injury while running (just as there is in any sport), there are many benefits. Some of these benefits include potential weight loss, improved cardiovascular and respiratory health (reducing the risk of cardiovascular and respiratory diseases), improved cardiovascular fitness, reduced total blood cholesterol, strengthening of bones (and potentially increased bone density), possible strengthening of the immune system and an improved self-esteem and emotional state. Running, like all forms of regular exercise, can effectively slow or reverse the effects of aging. Even people who have already experienced a heart attack are 20% less likely to develop serious heart problems if engaging more frequently in running or any type of aerobic activity.

Although an optimal amount of vigorous aerobic exercise such as running might bring benefits related to lower cardiovascular disease and life extension, an excessive dose (e.g., marathons) might have an opposite effect associated with cardiotoxicity. One systematic review and meta-analysis published in the British Journal of Sports Medicine found that runners had lower rates of death from any cause, cardiovascular disease and cancer than non-runners. It found no clear evidence that running more often, for longer or at a faster pace was associated with any further reduction in morality.

=== Metabolic ===
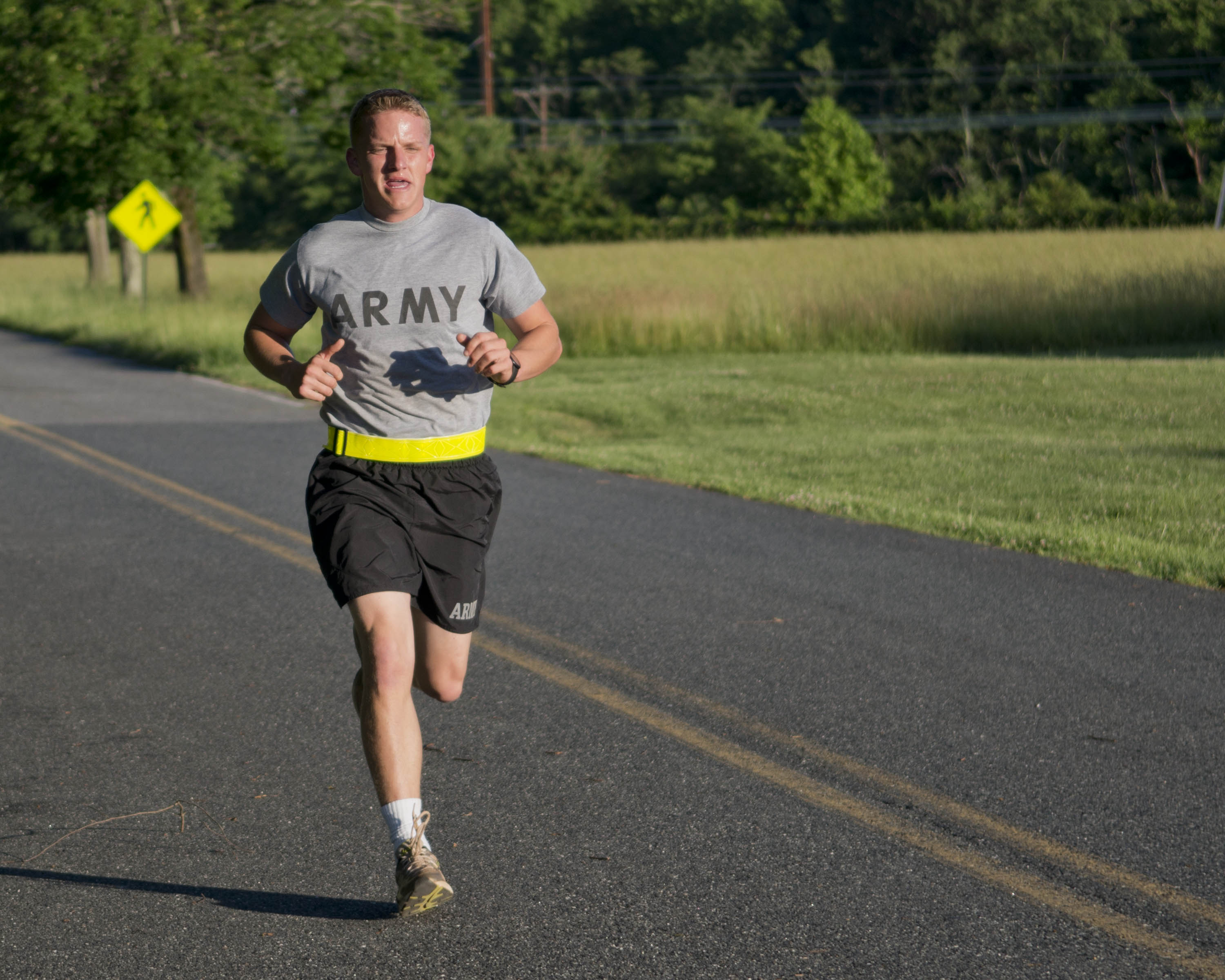
A U.S. Army soldier wearing sportswear runs to maintain his fitness.

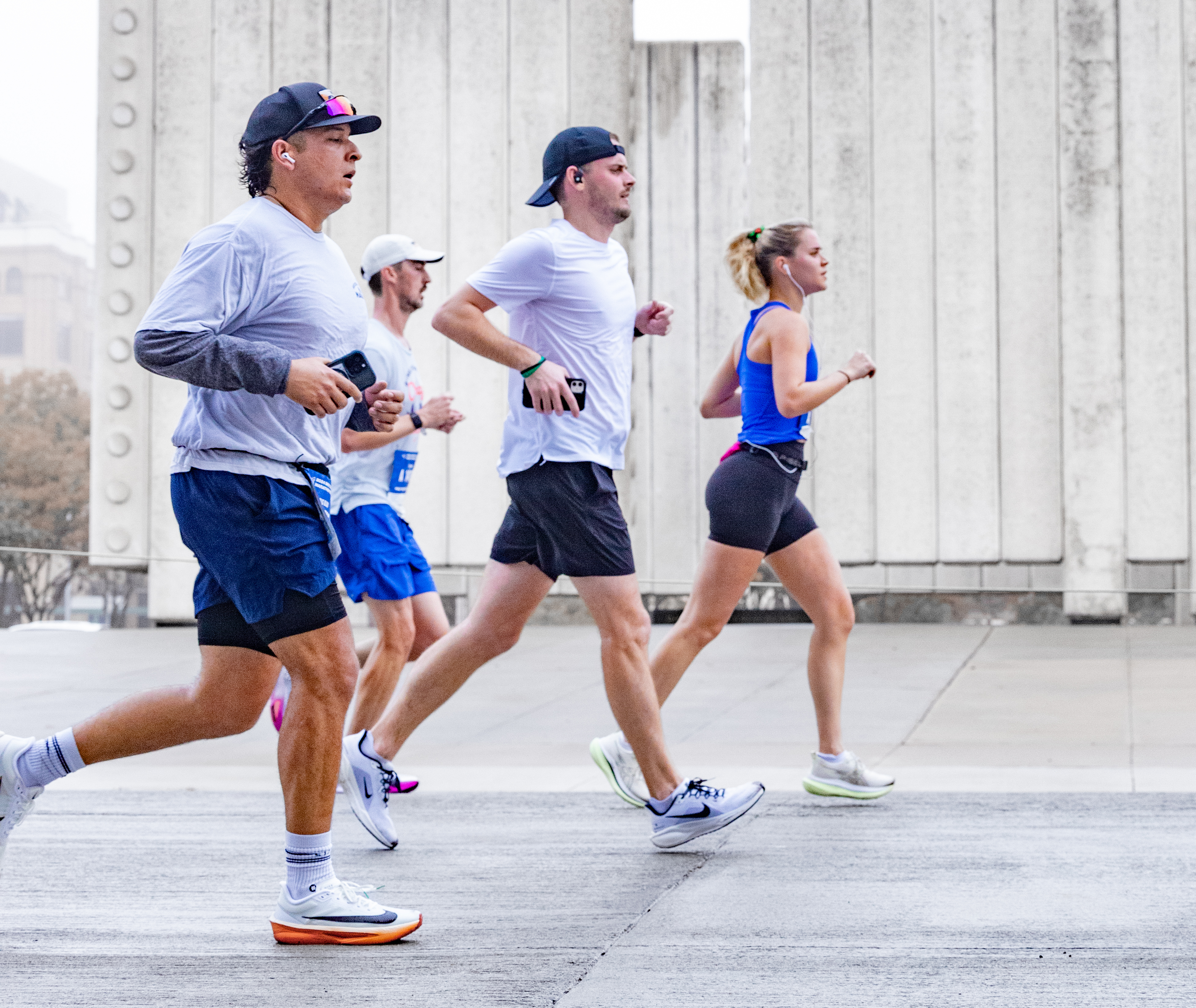
Dallas Marathon runners in 2024.

Running can assist people in losing weight, staying in shape and improving body composition. Research suggests that the person of average weight will burn approximately 100 calories per mile run. Running increases one's metabolism, even after running; one will continue to burn an increased level of calories for a short time after the run. Different speeds and distances are appropriate for different individual health and fitness levels. For new runners, it takes time to get into shape. The key is consistency and a slow increase in speed and distance. While running, it is best to pay attention to how one's body feels. If a runner is gasping for breath or feels exhausted while running, it may be beneficial to slow down or try a shorter distance for a few weeks. If a runner feels that the pace or distance is no longer challenging, then the runner may want to speed up or run farther.

=== Mental ===
Running can also have psychological benefits, as many participants in the sport report feeling an elated, euphoric state, often referred to as a "runner's high". Running is frequently recommended as therapy for people with clinical depression and people coping with addiction. A possible benefit may be the enjoyment of nature and scenery, which also improves psychological well-being (see Ecopsychology § Practical benefits).

In animal models, running has been shown to increase the number of newly created neurons within the brain. This finding could have significant implications in aging as well as learning and memory. A recent study published in Cell Metabolism has also linked running with improved memory and learning skills.

Running is a great technique to lower inflammation, stress, anxiety, and depression. People with seasonal affective disorder benefit from running outside in warm, sunny weather. Running can improve mental alertness and sleep. Both research and clinical experience have shown that exercise can be a treatment for serious depression and anxiety; thus, some physicians prescribe exercise to most of their patients. Running can have a longer-lasting effect than anti-depressants. The non-threatening environment offered by running generates a sense of achievement and belonging which helps with mental illness.

=== In combination with walking ===
If a person struggles to run continuously then they can alternate periods of running and walking. This is a form of interval training which allows a person to gradually build up their running ability in a progressive, safe way. The increased recovery possible during walking allows the person to restore their energy levels and reduce any strain on their body, thereby enabling them to start running again more easily. Combining running and walking may be used by people who are concerned that they may not be able to cope with a full run due to inexperience, lack of fitness, injury or other health problem. The walking aspect may also allow for an increased social element as conversation becomes easier. The combination of exercise and ample recovery time can also be therapeutic for participants which can mean a boost to mental wellbeing.

== Injuries ==
=== High impact ===
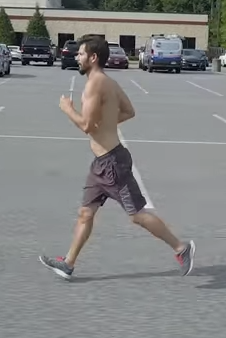
Person with a bad running form. Heel striking and leaning forward are some of the most common mistakes and cause of injuries among beginners.

Many injuries are associated with running because of its high-impact nature. Change in running volume may lead to development of patellofemoral pain syndrome, iliotibial band syndrome, patellar tendinopathy, plica syndrome, and medial tibial stress syndrome. Change in running pace may cause Achilles tendinitis, gastrocnemius injuries, and plantar fasciitis. Repetitive stress on the same tissues without enough time for recovery or running with improper form can lead to many of the above. Runners generally attempt to minimize these injuries by warming up before exercise, focusing on proper running form, performing strength training exercises, eating a well balanced diet, allowing time for recovery, and "icing" (applying ice to sore muscles or taking an ice bath).

Some runners may experience injuries when running on concrete surfaces. The problem with running on concrete is that the body adjusts to this flat surface running, and some of the muscles will become weaker, along with the added impact of running on a harder surface. Therefore, it can be beneficial to change terrain occasionally – such as trail, beach, or grass running. This is more unstable ground and allows the legs to strengthen different muscles. Runners should be wary of twisting their ankles on such terrain. Running downhill also increases knee stress and should, therefore, be avoided. Reducing the frequency and duration can also prevent injury.

Barefoot running has been promoted as a means of reducing running related injuries, but this remains controversial and a majority of professionals advocate the wearing of appropriate shoes as the best method for avoiding injury. However, a study in 2013 concluded that wearing neutral shoes is not associated with increased injuries.

=== Chafing ===
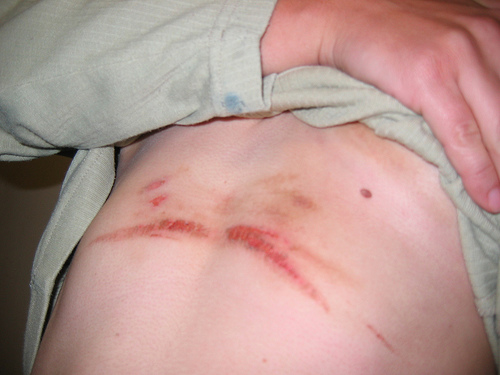
Chafing of skin following a marathon run

Another common, running-related injury is chafing, caused by repetitive rubbing of one piece of skin against another, or against an article of clothing. One common location for chafe to occur is the runner's upper thighs. The skin feels coarse and develops a rash-like look. A variety of deodorants and special anti-chafing creams are available to treat such problems. Chafe is also likely to occur on the nipple. There are a variety of home remedies that runners use to deal with chafing while running such as band-aids and using grease to reduce friction. Prevention is key which is why form fitting clothes are important.

=== Iliotibial band syndrome ===
An iliotibial band is a muscle and tendon that is attached to the hip and runs the length of the thigh to attach to the upper part of the tibia, and the band is what helps the knee to bend. This is an injury that is located at the knee and shows symptoms of swelling outside the knee. Iliotibial band syndrome is also known as "runner's knee" or "jogger's knee" because it can be caused by jogging or running. Once pain or swelling is noticeable it is important to put ice on it immediately and it is recommended to rest the knee for better healing. Most knee injuries can be treated by light activity and much rest for the knee. In more serious cases, arthroscopy is the most common to help repair ligaments but severe situations reconstructive surgery would be needed. A survey was taken in 2011 with knee injuries being 22.7% of the most common injuries.

=== Medial tibial stress syndrome ===
A more known injury is medial tibial stress syndrome (MTSS) which is the accurate name for shin splints. This is caused during running when the muscle is being overused along the front of the lower leg with symptoms that affect 5 to 15 centimetres (2 to 6 in) of the muscle. Shin splints have sharp, splinter-like pain, that is typically X-rayed by doctors but is not necessary for shin splints to be diagnosed. To help prevent shin splints it is commonly known to stretch before and after a workout session, and also avoid heavy equipment especially during the first couple of workout sessions. Also to help prevent shin splints do not increase the intensity of a workout more than 10% a week. To treat shin splints it is important to rest with the least amount of impact on your legs and apply ice to the area. A survey showed that shin splints make up 12.7% of the most common injuries in running, with blisters being the top percentage at 30.9%.

=== Iron anemia ===
Iron deficiency and anemia can occur in long distance runners. This illness is due to the constant heel strike in some runners leading to the crushing of red blood cells (hemolysis). As a product of red blood cells being crushed, runners may feel reduced energy, reduced endurance, and poor recovery. Anemia can also be caused by iron being let out through sweat and intense workouts leading to the digestive tract shutting down. Treatment includes eating iron rich foods like kale, broccoli, red meat, and poultry.

== Events ==
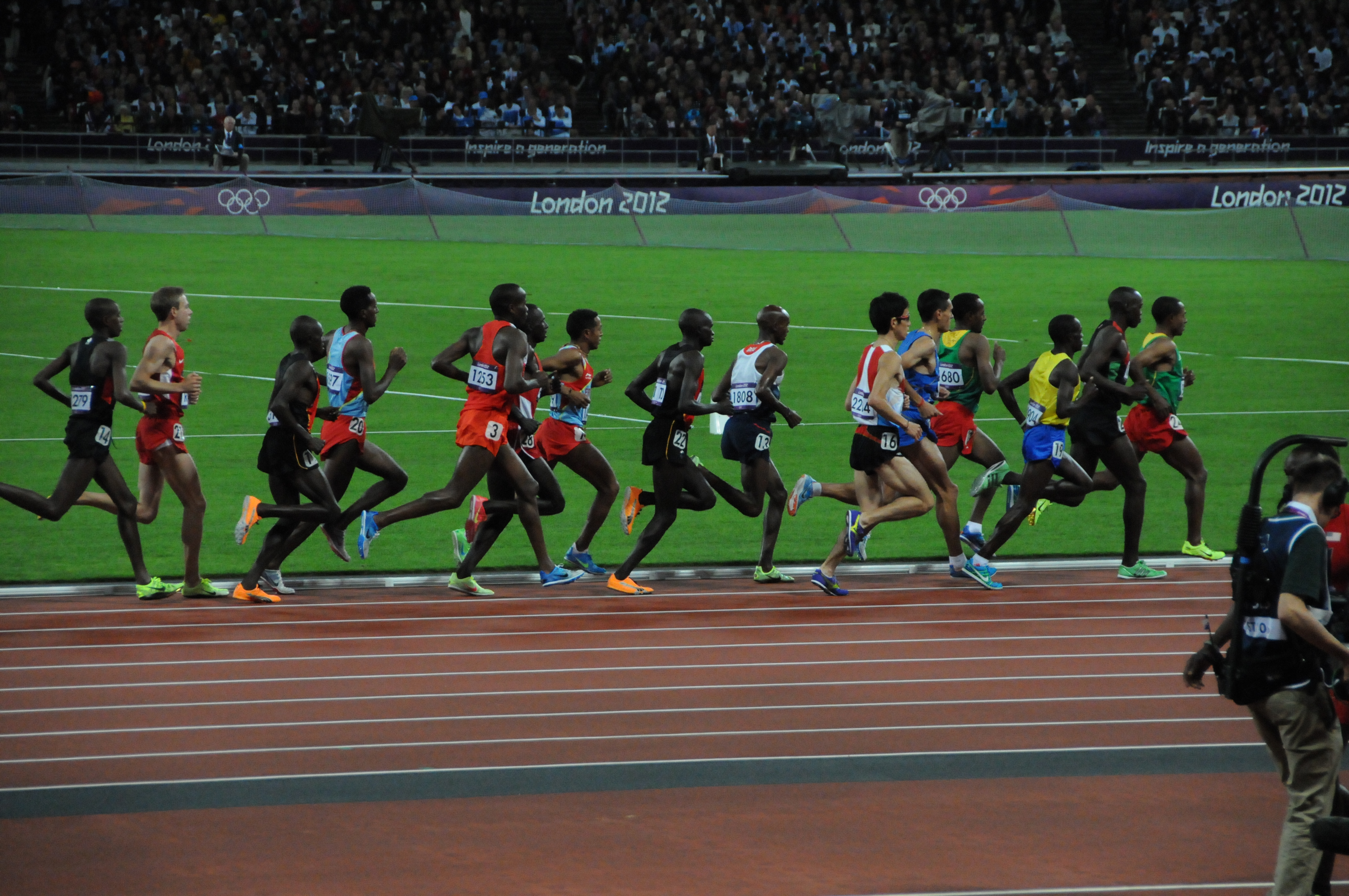
Competitors in the men's 10,000-metre run at the 2012 Summer Olympics.

Running is both a competition and a type of training for sports that have running or endurance components. As a sport, it is split into events divided by distance and sometimes includes permutations such as the obstacles in steeplechase and hurdles. Running races are contests to determine which of the competitors is able to run a certain distance in the shortest time. Today, competitive running events make up the core of the sport of athletics. Events are usually grouped into several classes, each requiring substantially different athletic strengths and involving different tactics, training methods, and types of competitors.

Running competitions have probably existed for most of humanity's history and were a key part of the ancient Olympic Games as well as the modern Olympics. The activity of running went through a period of widespread popularity in the United States during the running boom of the 1970s. Over the next two decades, as many as 25 million Americans were doing some form of running or jogging – accounting for roughly one tenth of the population. Today, road racing is a popular sport among non-professional athletes, who included over 7.7 million people in America alone in 2002.

=== Limits of speed ===
Footspeed, or sprint speed, is the maximum speed at which a human can run. It is affected by many factors, varies greatly throughout the population, and is important in athletics and many sports. Air resistance for top sprinters can take up to 5% of their energy.

The fastest human footspeed on record is 44.7 km/h (12.4 m/s; 27.8 mph), seen during a 100-meter sprint (average speed between the 60th and the 80th meter) by Usain Bolt.

=== Speeds achieved over different distances based on world record times ===
(As of March 26, 2026)

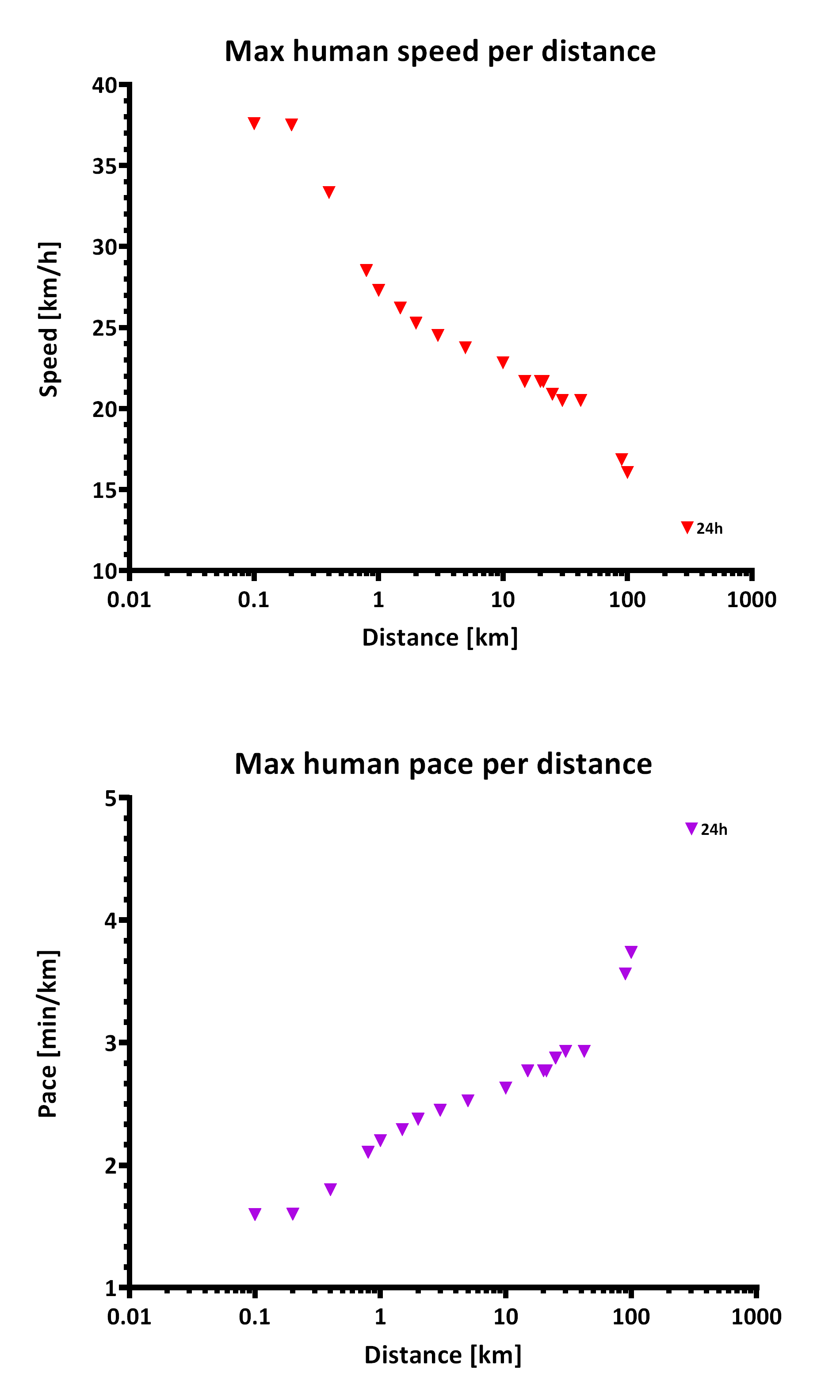
Maximum human speed [km/h] and pace [min/km] per distance

Distance metres	Men m/s	Women m/s
100	10.44	9.53
200	10.42	9.37
400	9.30	8.44
800	7.92	7.06
1,000	7.58	6.71
1,500	7.28	6.56
1,609 (mile)	7.22	6.36
2,000	7.02	6.15
3,000	6.81	6.17
5,000	6.60	5.97
10,000 track	6.34	5.64
10,000 road	6.23	5.49
15,000 road	6.02	5.38
20,000 track	5.91	5.09
20,000 road	6.02	5.30
21,097 Half marathon	6.2	5.29*
21,285 One hour run	5.91	5.14
25,000 track	5.63	4.78
25,000 road	5.80	5.22
30,000 track	5.60	4.72
30,000 road	5.69	5.06
42,195 Marathon	5.69	5.19
90,000 Comrades	4.68	4.23
100,000	4.46	4.24
303,506 24-hour run	3.513	2.82

* women's 21,097m Ruth Chepngtich was caught doping 6 months later

=== Types ===
Track

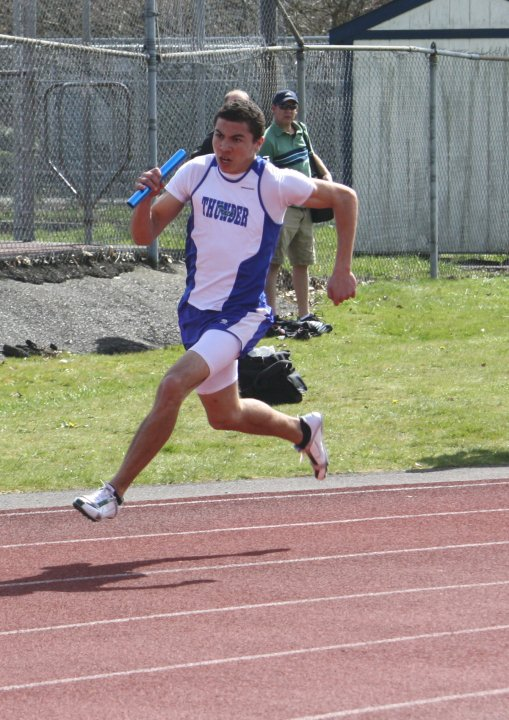
A man running with a baton during a relay race.

Track running events are individual or relay events with athletes racing over specified distances on an oval running track. The events are categorized as sprints, middle and long-distance, and hurdling.

Road

Road running takes place on a measured course over an established road (as opposed to track and cross country running). These events normally range from distances of 5 kilometers to longer distances such as half marathons and marathons, and they may involve scores of runners or wheelchair entrants.

Cross-country

Cross country running takes place over the open or rough terrain. The courses used for these events may include grass, mud, woodlands, hills, flat ground and water. It is a popular participatory sport and is one of the events which, along with track and field, road running, and racewalking, makes up the umbrella sport of athletics.

Vertical

The majority of popular races do not incorporate a significant change in elevation as a key component of a course. There are several, disparate variations that feature significant inclines or declines. These fall into two main groups.

The naturalistic group is based on outdoor racing over geographical features. Among these are the cross country-related sports of fell running (a tradition associated with Northern Europe) and trail running (mainly ultramarathon distances), the running/climbing combination of skyrunning (organised by the International Skyrunning Federation with races across North America, Europe and East Asia) and the mainly trail- and road-centred mountain running (governed by the World Mountain Running Association and based mainly in Europe).

The second variety of vertical running is based on human structures, such as stairs and man-made slopes. The foremost type of this is tower running, which sees athletes compete indoors, running up steps within very tall structures such as the Eiffel Tower or Empire State Building.

=== Distances ===
==== Sprints ====
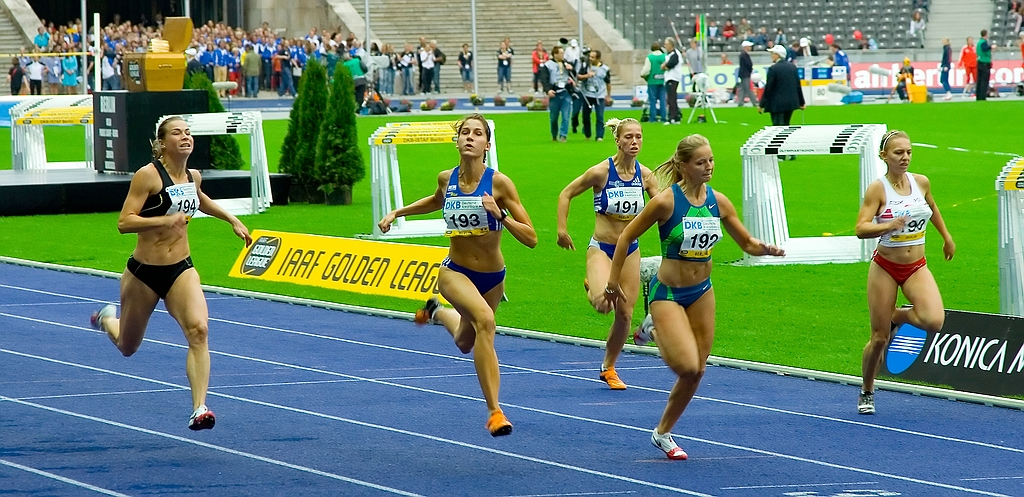
International-level women athletes competing in 100 m sprint race at ISTAF Berlin, 2006

Sprints are short running events in athletics and track and field. Races over short distances are among the oldest running competitions. The first 13 editions of the Ancient Olympic Games featured only one event – the stadion race, which was a race from one end of the stadium to the other. There are three sprinting events which are currently held at the Olympics and outdoor World Championships: the 100 metres, 200 metres, and 400 metres. These events have their roots in races of imperial measurements which were later altered to metric: the 100 m evolved from the 100-yard dash, the 200 m distances came from the furlong (or 1/8 of a mile), and the 400 m was the successor to the 440-yard dash or quarter-mile race.

At the professional level, sprinters begin the race by assuming a crouching position in the starting blocks before leaning forward and gradually moving into an upright position as the contest progresses and momentum is gained. Athletes remain in the same lane on the running track throughout all sprinting events, with the sole exception of the 400 m indoors. Races up to 100 m are largely focused upon acceleration to an athlete's maximum speed. All sprints beyond this distance increasingly incorporate an element of endurance. Human physiology dictates that a runner's near-top speed cannot be maintained for more than thirty seconds or so as lactic acid builds up, and leg muscles begin to be deprived of oxygen.

The 60 metres is a common indoor event and it an indoor world championship event. Other less-common events include the 50 metres, 55 metres, 300 metres and 500 metres which are used in some high and collegiate competitions in the United States. The 150 metres, is rarely competed: Pietro Mennea set a world best in 1983, Olympic champions Michael Johnson and Donovan Bailey went head-to-head over the distance in 1997, and Usain Bolt improved Mennea's record in 2009.

==== Middle distance ====
Middle-distance running events are track races longer than sprints up to 3000 metres. The standard middle distances are the 800 metres, 1500 metres and mile run, although the 3000 metres may also be classified as a middle-distance event. The 880-yard run, or half-mile, was the forebear to the 800 m distance and it has its roots in competitions in the United Kingdom in the 1830s. The 1500 m came about as a result of running three laps of a 500 m track, which was commonplace in continental Europe in the 1900s.

==== Long distance ====
Examples of longer-distance running events are long-distance track races, half marathons (13.1 miles), marathons (26.2 miles), ultramarathons (> 26.2 miles) , and multiday races. Long-distance track races include the 5000m and 10000m, and long-distance road races recognized by World Athletics can range anywhere from the 5000m all the way up to 100km races.

== Training ==
=== Interval training ===
Running can be practiced at different speeds, during the same session, in order to produce different training effects. For example, a person can begin by jogging for five minutes, run fast for 20 seconds, then jog again for five minutes, then run fast for 20 seconds again and so forth. As the ratio between energy expenditure and energy recovery is more even at slower speeds, this allows them to recover more energy. In contrast, at faster speeds the energy expenditure is higher and the ability to recover energy reduced. This is reflected in the respective gait cycles whereby in slower runs the runner spends longer in the main active recovery phase which follows on from foot strike and shock absorption. The additional time in this phase allows for the increased recovery of energy. As such, adopting a slower speed after running fast means more energy is regained which in turn can allow them to run fast again. This form of interval training, where the speed is varied without stopping to aid recovery, is also known as 'speed play', which is a translation of the original Swedish term fartlek.

A purpose of interval training is often to enable a runner to build up to running fast for longer periods i.e. they gradually increase the time they run fast for before returning to jogging speed. This can allow for their general level of fitness, including their aerobic and anaerobic capacity, and their muscular strength to develop in a less stressful manner and with reduced risk of injury due to excessive strain. It also improves their ability to run long distances. Interval running is frequently used in a regimented way with set distances, times and rest breaks between periods of work. For example, marathon runners may run a 'pyramid' of 200m, 400m, 800m, 400m, 200m with a two minute rest between each run. As the distances are run faster than marathon speed and cumulatively still incorporate a strong element of endurance it trains their bodies to better cope with the lactic acid build up which occurs due to the exertion required when running a marathon.

== See also ==
- Endurance running hypothesis
- The Horse in Motion
- Level and incline running
- List of people killed while running
- Naruto run
- Outline of running
- Running energetics
- Skyrunning
- Speedrunning
