= Pavo Urban =

- Born: 1 August 1968; Dubrovnik, SR Croatia, SFR Yugoslavia
- Died: 6 December 1991 (aged 23); Dubrovnik, Croatia
- Occupation: Photographer

Pavo Urban (1 August 1968 – 6 December 1991) was a Croatian photographer, killed during the Croatian War of Independence.

== Biography ==
He attended the Dubrovnik Maritime College. He started taking photographs in high school, and was accepted in the photography department of the Academy of Dramatic Art of the University of Zagreb.

However, instead of attending the Academy he briefly joined the Croatian War of Independence as a volunteer fighting in Župa dubrovačka, and then he started photographing the Siege of Dubrovnik for the Dubrovacki Vjesnik, the Slobodna Dalmacija and the Croatian Ministry of Information, documenting the shelling and its consequences.

In the morning of 6 December 1991 he was fatally hit by a shell fragment while he was taking his last photographs.

The last photo of Pavo Urban was on 6 December 1991. A moment later he was killed by shrapnels from Serbian and Montenegrin shelling. He was alone at that time of the bombing.

== Heritage ==
Part of his work, including a series of 12 photos he took just before he was killed, is now part of the collection of the Museum of Modern Art in Dubrovnik. His photographs have been shown in several exhibitions.

== See also ==
- List of journalists killed in Europe
- Gordan Lederer
