= 1994 roadside attack on Spin magazine journalists =

Attack during the Bosnian War

1994 roadside attack on Magnolia News and Spin magazine journalists
- Date: May 1, 1994; 4:00 P.M.
- Weapon: Land mines
- Deaths: 2
- Injuries: 1
- Perpetrators: Croats and Bosnian government troops

In the 1994 roadside attack on Spin magazine journalists on May Day during the Bosnian War, two journalists, Bryan Brinton and Francis William Tomasic, were killed by a landmine, and journalist and novelist William T. Vollmann was injured near Mostar in Bosnia and Herzegovina.

== Description ==
Mostar is in Bosnia and Herzegovina and shown relative to its capital city Sarajevo.

William T. Vollmann, Bryan Brinton, and Francis William Tomasic, United States journalists, were in a jeep driving through the north of Mostar in Bosnia and Herzegovina, when they had driven off the main road in territory controlled by the Bosnian army. While driving on this road, the vehicle ran over a landmine at around 4:00 p.m. on 1 May 1994. The mine injured and hospitalized Vollmann and killed Brinton and Tomasic.

== Bryan Brinton ==
Bryan William Brinton, also known as William Ryan (June 16, 1949 – May 1, 1994), grew up in Crown Hill, Washington. Brinton was the youngest of three brothers from the West Seattle area. He used the name William Ryan at times because it was his middle name and his mother's maiden name. Brinton was enlisted in the army from June 18, 1968 – March 20, 1971 and toured the Vietnam War as a medic. After breaking up with a girlfriend when he was 44 years old, Brinton began studying photojournalism and family therapy at Shoreline Community College, hoping to one day pursue photography and journalism full-time rather than landscaping (Brinton owned a landscaping business, Northwest Pacific Tree Service, for most of his adult life.).

Brinton traveled to Bosnia and Herzegovina to gain access to press credentials. There he contacted Magnolia News on April 25, 1994, from Croatia and offered his photographs in exchange for press credentials. He wanted to take pictures in war-torn Bosnia and Herzegovina.

== Francis William Tomasic ==
Francis William Tomasic (26 April 1958 – 1 May 1994), a freelance photographer, age 36, was from Bloomington, Indiana, and attended high school there. Tomasic was a friend of William T. Vollmann; they met while attending the same high school. After high school, Tomasic got his degree in Serbo-Croatian language from Cornell University. Vollmann studied Comparative Literature at Cornell. Both ended up on the trip to Bosnia. Tomasic's father was a professor at Indiana University. He was of Croatian descent. Tomasic was working as a freelance photographer and translator for Spin magazine. His friends say that he was an aspiring journalist and that is what drew him to Bosnia and Herzegovina. A friend of Francis stated, "I think Fran thought that there might be some way to help people understand what was going on in Yugoslavia if some journalists could talk to the people at the helm."

== Context ==
Mostar was the location of the conflict between Bosnian Croats and Muslims. The land mine which the vehicle ran over was near a dam at Salakovac, north of Mostar in Bosnia. A U.N. Military spokesman stated the unrest in the area was the worst fights between Bosnian Serbs and U.N. forces in Bosnia in 2 years, when the fighting first began in the Yugoslav Republic of Macedonia. About 3 million mines were laid down during this war.

== Reactions ==
In a tribute to Francis Tomasic on May 26, 1994, in the United States House of Representatives, a speech was given to honor him. The speech mentioned that the combat zones are unpredictable, with the ones in the new Republic of Yugoslavia being the most unforeseeable. An acquaintance of Tomasic stated he had "inexhaustible sweetness and that he was not someone who understood malice."

== See also ==
- Spin (magazine)
- Kurt Schork, another US journalist who covered the Bosnian war and who was killed on assignment in Sierra Leone.
- List of journalists killed in Europe
