= List of people killed while running =

People murdered while running for exercise

People have been murdered while running for exercise in many countries. This list documents selected homicide cases in which the victim was attacked during a run or disappeared after leaving for one. It excludes traffic collisions, deaths during organized races and deaths from natural medical causes.

Public concern about runner safety also encompasses harassment and assaults that do not end in death. In a 2023 survey commissioned by Adidas, involving 9,000 runners in nine countries, 92% of women reported concern for their safety and 38% said they had experienced physical or verbal harassment. A separate University of Manchester survey in north-west England found that more than two-thirds of the women respondents reported harassment while running. The surveys used different samples and questions, so their figures are not directly comparable.

The list is limited to people and cases with substantial coverage in an existing English Wikipedia article. Dates refer to the attack or disappearance, not necessarily the discovery of the body or a later conviction. It is a navigational list, not a representative sample; its geographical distribution reflects available coverage and should not be used to infer where such crimes are most common.

People murdered while running
Name	Date	Location	Details
Kaye Turner	24 December 1978	Camp Sherman, Oregon, United States	Turner disappeared during a Christmas Eve run; her remains were found eight months later. John Ackroyd and Roger Beck were later convicted of her murder.
Roberta "Bibi" Lee	4 November 1984	Redwood Regional Park, Oakland, California, United States	Lee became separated from Bradley Page and a friend during a run; her body was found five weeks later. Page was convicted of voluntary manslaughter.
Winnifred Teo	22 May 1985	Old Holland Road, Singapore	Teo failed to return from an evening jog; her body was found off Holland Road the next morning, with her hands bound.
Suzanne Marie Collins	11 July 1985	Millington, Tennessee, United States	Collins was abducted during a late-night run; her body was found the next morning. Sedley Alley was convicted of her murder and executed in 2006.
Mandy Stavik	24 November 1989	Acme, Washington, United States	Stavik disappeared while jogging with her dog; her body was found in the Nooksack River three days later. Timothy Bass was convicted in 2019.
Laura Smither	3 April 1997	Friendswood, Texas, United States	Smither disappeared during a morning jog; her body was found 17 days later. William Reece pleaded guilty to her murder in 2022.
Nancy Adleman	29 July 1997	Houston, Texas, United States	Adleman failed to return from an evening jog along Brays Bayou; Arthur Lee Burton was convicted of her murder.
Chandra Levy	1 May 2001	Rock Creek Park, Washington, D.C., United States	Levy disappeared while jogging in Rock Creek Park; her remains were found there more than a year later. Charges against Ingmar Guandique were dismissed in 2016 after his conviction was vacated.
Chee Gaik Yap	14 January 2006	Sungai Petani, Kedah, Malaysia	Chee disappeared while jogging with her sister and was found dead early the next day. Shahril Jaafar was convicted of her murder; the Federal Court upheld his death sentence in 2024.
Rebekah Bletsch	29 June 2014	Dalton Township, Michigan, United States	Bletsch was shot while jogging along Automobile Road. Jeffrey Willis was convicted of her murder in 2017.
Yangjie Li	11 May 2016	Dessau-Roßlau, Saxony-Anhalt, Germany	Li was abducted while jogging. Sebastian Flech was later sentenced to life imprisonment for her murder; Xenia Lang received a youth sentence for sexual coercion.
Karina Vetrano	2 August 2016	Howard Beach, Queens, New York, United States	Vetrano was attacked while running in Spring Creek Park. Chanel Lewis was convicted of murder and sexual abuse in 2019.
Vanessa Marcotte	7 August 2016	Princeton, Massachusetts, United States	Marcotte left her mother's home for a run (Note: Contemporaneous local reporting described the outing as a jog, while a 2022 NBC News report called it a walk.) and was found dead later that day. Angelo Colon-Ortiz pleaded guilty to second-degree murder in 2022.
Vicente Bermúdez Zacarías	17 October 2016	Metepec, State of Mexico, Mexico	Bermúdez was shot during a morning jog near his home and died shortly after being taken to a hospital.
Mollie Tibbetts	18 July 2018	Brooklyn, Iowa, United States	Tibbetts disappeared during an evening jog; her body was found about a month later. Cristhian Bahena Rivera was convicted of first-degree murder in 2021.
Victoria Marinova	6 October 2018	Ruse, Bulgaria	Marinova was attacked while jogging in Ruse. Severin Krasimirov pleaded guilty and was sentenced to 30 years in prison.
Suzanne Eaton	2 July 2019	Crete, Greece	Eaton disappeared while jogging during a conference; her body was found five days later in a cave that had served as a wartime bunker.
Ahmaud Arbery	23 February 2020	Satilla Shores, Georgia, United States	Three men pursued Arbery while he was jogging; Travis McMichael shot him. All three men were convicted of murder in 2021.
Tay Rui Hao	10 May 2020	Punggol, Singapore	Tay was stabbed by a stranger while jogging and died early the next morning. Surajsrikan Diwakar Mani Tripathi was sentenced to life imprisonment and 15 strokes of the cane.
Ashling Murphy	12 January 2022	Tullamore, County Offaly, Ireland	Murphy was stabbed while jogging along the Grand Canal. Jozef Puška was convicted of her murder in 2023.
Susan Karnatz	13 October 2022	Raleigh, North Carolina, United States	Karnatz was shot on the Neuse River Greenway during a mass shooting while on a planned seven-mile run; she was one of five people killed.
Rachel Morin	5 August 2023	Bel Air, Maryland, United States	Morin was attacked on the Ma & Pa Trail; her body was found the next day. Victor Martinez-Hernandez was convicted in 2025 and sentenced to two consecutive life terms plus 40 years.
Laken Riley	22 February 2024	Athens, Georgia, United States	Riley was attacked while running at the University of Georgia; José Ibarra was convicted of her murder and sentenced to life without parole in 2024.
Katie Suarez	30 October 2026	Brooklyn, New York, United States	Suarez was stabbed twice in the neck in an apparently random attack while jogging along a path on Shore Parkway in Brooklyn.

== See also ==
- List of marathon fatalities
