= List of journalists killed in Europe =

This is a list of journalists killed in Europe (as a continent), divided by country.

While journalists in the European Union (EU) generally work in good conditions, there are cases of murdered journalists, and many of them remain unpunished. This list includes non-EU countries within Europe such as Turkey, Ukraine and Russia.

Number of journalists killed or murdered in Europe (not all countries included in the list are included in the map) while on duty or assignment, 1992–2017

== Abkhazia ==
- Alexandra Tuttle, correspondent for The Wall Street Journal, was killed on 22 September 1993 when the military plane on which she was flying was hit by an Abkhazian ground-to-air missile.
- Andrey Soloviev, Soviet war photographer for ITAR-TASS was killed by a sniper in Sukhumi on 27 September 1993.
- Georgy Chanya, correspondent for Resonants was killed on 26 May 1998 while reporting fighting between Abkhazian rebels and Georgian guerrilla fighters near Gali.

== Armenia ==
- Tigran Nagdalian, fatally shot in the head on 28 December 2002 in Yerevan.

== Austria ==
- Hugo Bettauer, assassinated by Nazis in 1925.

== Azerbaijan ==
- Photographer reporter Chingiz Mustafayev for Democratic Russia Press Agency was killed on 15 June 1992, while filming fighting between Azerbaijanis and Armenians in Nagorno-Karabakh.
- Camera operator Adil Bunyatov for Reuters TV and the Turan News Agency was killed on 17 March 1995, while covering a military offense on a rebel police unit.
- Elmar Huseynov, founder and editor of the opposition weekly news magazine Monitor, was gunned down in his apartment building in Baku on 2 March 2005.
- Newspaper editor Novruzali Mamedov, of the now-defunct Talysh minority newspaper Talyshi Sado, died in a prison hospital on 17 August 2009. His death was condemned by Baku-based Institute for Reporters' Freedom and Safety as government neglect.
- Freelance reporter Rafiq Tağı, who contributed to the Azerbaijani branch of Radio Free Europe/Radio Liberty (RFE/RL), was stabbed on 19 November 2011 and died in a Baku hospital on 23 November.
- Rasim Aliyev, chairman of the Institute for Reporters' Freedom and Safety, was beaten up on 8 August 2015 by football fans for his opinion against one of the players. He died from his wounds the following day.

== Belarus ==
- Dzmitry Zavadski disappeared and was presumably murdered on 7 July 2000. On 14 March 2002 four people were sentenced for his abduction, but not for the murder, as the body had never been found, and while the performers may have been condemned, the masterminds are still at large. He was declared dead on 28 November 2003.
- Veronika Cherkasova, murdered by an unknown assailant in 2004.
- Aleh Byabenin was found hanged in the stairwell of his summer home in Minsk on 3 September 2010, but no suicide note was found.

== Bosnia and Herzegovina ==
Twenty-five journalists were killed in Bosnia and Herzegovina during the Yugoslav Wars between 1991 and 1995:

- On 9 April 1992 Kjašif Smajlović, Bosnian journalist working for the Oslobođenje, was killed in his office in Zvornik by Serbian soldiers
- On 29 May 1993 a humanitarian convoy was assailed near Gornji Vakuf. Italian journalist Guido Puletti was killed among fellow pacifists Sergio Lana and Fabio Moreni, while two others escaped. Hanefija Prijić (Paraga), the leader of the group of Bosnian soldiers responsible for the killings, was condemned to 13 years in prison.
- Dominique Lonneux, Belgian freelance cameraman working for a Mexican TV, was wounded and died on 2 June 1993 in western Herzegovina when the UNPROFOR convoy he was travelling with was attacked.
- Tasar Omer, Turkish freelance journalist, was killed on 27 June 1993 by a sniper in Sarajevo at a funeral.
- On 28 January 1994, Marco Luchetta, Alessandro Saša Ota and Dario D'Angelo, three Italian journalist working for RAI, were killed in Mostar by a mortar.
- On 1 May 1994, journalists Bryan Brinton and Francis William Tomasic were killed, and novelist William T. Vollmann was injured, by a landmine near Mostar.
- Sasa Kolevski, cameraman for the Bosnian Serb Television in Banja Luka, disappeared on 23 September 1995 in Mount Ozren, together with the station driver Goran Pejcinovic, whose body was returned to Bosnian Serb authorities on 25 October.

== Bulgaria ==
- Radio presenter and author Bobi Tsankov was shot dead in central Sofia on 5 January 2010.
- Victoria Marinova, a television journalist who reported on an investigation into alleged corruption involving European Union funds, was murdered in Bulgaria's northern town of Ruse. Her body was found on 6 October 2018. A Bulgarian man, Severin Krasimirov was found guilty and sentenced to 30 years in jail. Prosecutors said the crime was "linked to sexual motives and had no links to the profession of the victim."

== Croatia ==
According to the Croatian Journalists' Association (HND) at least 14 Croatian reporters, cameramen and technicians were killed in Croatia during the Yugoslav Wars; according to Balkan Insight 13 foreign reporters were also killed:

- Egon Scotland, German journalist working for the Süddeutsche Zeitung was killed on 26 July 1991 in Glina. Serbian paramilitary commander Dragan Vasiljković (Captain Dragan) was found guilty for his death.
- Croatian photographer and cameraman Gordan Lederer was killed by a Serbian sniper in Hrvatska Kostajnica on 9 August 1991, during the Croatian War of Independence.
- Russian war reporters Viktor Nogin and Gennadiy Kurinnoy, working for the All-Russia State Television and Radio Broadcasting Company, were shot, probably by Serbian rebels, on 1 September 1991.
- Serbian journalists working for the state television Zoran Amidžić, Bora Petrović, Dejan Milićević and Sretan Ilić were shot and killed by Croatian forces in Novo Selište on 9 October 1991.
- Croatian reporter Siniša Glavašević was beaten and executed by Serbian paramilitary forces, along with hundreds of others between 18 and 20 November 1991, during the Battle of Vukovar.
- Serbian Canadian International Weekly correspondent Jerry Spasic (a member of the Serbian Guard) was killed on 21 November 1991 in Laslovo after being wounded and tortured as a prisoner of war.
- Croatian photographer Pavo Urban was killed by a shell fragment during a bombing in Dubrovnik on 6 December 1991.
- John Schofield, radio journalist for the BBC, was shot and killed in August 1995.
- Croatian journalist Ivo Pukanić and his business associate Niko Franjić were killed in an assassination attempt in Zagreb on 23 October 2008. They were killed by a car bomb in front of the Nacional editorial office. The media characterized the assassination as a terrorist act.

== Cyprus ==
- Fazıl Önder, 1958
- Journalist Adem Yavuz was shot dead after being captured by the Greek Cypriots on 26 August 1974.
- Turkish Cypriot journalist Kutlu Adalı was fatally machine-gunned outside his home in Nicosia on 6 July 1996. The Turkish Revenge Brigade claimed responsibility, but no one was convicted. According to his widow, evidence had been wiped away and no investigation was conducted.

== Denmark ==
- Kim Wall, a Swedish freelance journalist, was murdered by entrepreneur Peter Madsen on board his submarine UC3 Nautilus in August 2017. Madsen was sentenced to life imprisonment.

== France ==
- Francisco Javier Galdeano, correspondent of Egin in the French Basque Country, was killed in Saint-Jean-de-Luz on 30 May 1985.
- Journalist and essayist Nicolas Giudici was killed in Corsica on 16 June 2001. The investigators excluded that the crime could have been related with politics or mafia, and the National Liberation Front of Corsica denied involvement. A robber was suspected for the crime, but he was killed before the trial.
- Nine of the 12 victims of Charlie Hebdo shooting on 7 January 2015, were journalists: Jean Maurice Jules Cabut (Cabu), Elsa Cayat, Stéphane Charbonnier (Charb), Philippe Honoré, Bernard Maris, Mustapha Ourrad, Michel Renaud, Bernard Verlhac (Tignous) and Georges Wolinski. Philippe Lançon, Fabrice Nicolino and Laurent "Riss" Sourisseau were wounded.
- Guillaume B. Decherf, music journalist for Les Inrockuptibles, was killed in the November 2015 attack on the Bataclan theatre.
- Radio journalists Antonio Megalizzi and Bartosz Niedzielski were among the victims of the 11 December 2018 Strasbourg attack. A radio studio at the European Parliament has been named after them.

== Georgia ==
- David Bolkvadze, Georgian journalist working for Worldwide Television News, was killed in Khobi on 28 October 1993 while reporting the Georgian Civil War.
- Antonio Russo, Italian journalist working for Radio Radicale, was killed in Ujarma on 16 October 2000.
- Giorgi Sanaia, anchor for Rustavi-2 was killed in his apartment in Tbilisi on 26 July 2001.
- Stan Storimans, Dutch cameraman for RTL TV, was killed in Gori on 12 August 2008, during the Russo-Georgian War. According to the Dutch government he was killed by a Russian cluster bomb.
- Alexander Lashkarava, Georgian journalist was found dead on 11 July 2021 after having been beaten in an anti-LGBT attack. The killing of Alexander Lashkarava was condemned by the Director-General of the UNESCO Audrey Azoulay in a press-release published on the 13th of July. According to global monitoring on the safety of journalists by the Observatory of Killed journalist, Lashkarava is the 1st and only media professional killed in Georgia in 2021.

== Germany ==
- Jusuf Gërvalla, assassinated in 1982 in West Germany, allegedly by the Yugoslav government.
- Alexandra Fröhlich, assassinated in 2025 in Hamburg, Germany by blunt force trauma; a suspect was later arrested by the German police.

== Greece ==
- Investigative journalist and broadcaster Sokratis Giolias was assassinated on 19 July 2010 in Ilioupoli, Athens. He was shot more than 15 times with guns that have previously been used by the Sect of Revolutionaries, but the killers remain unpunished.
- Crime journalist Giorgos Karaivaz was killed outside his home in Athens on 9 April 2021.

== Ireland ==
- Crime reporter Veronica Guerin was murdered by drug lords on 26 June 1996.

== Italy ==
Eleven journalists were killed in Italy by mafias or terrorist organizations:

- Cosimo Cristina, killed by the Sicilian Mafia on 5 May 1960.
- Mauro De Mauro disappeared on 16 September 1970 and his body was never found.
- Giovanni Spampinato, killed by the Mafia on 27 October 1972.
- Carlo Casalegno, killed by the Red Brigades on 29 November 1977.
- Peppino Impastato, killed by the Mafia on 9 May 1978.
- Mario Francese, killed by the Mafia on 26 January 1979.
- Carmine Pecorelli, known mostly by his nickname "Mino", killed in unknown circumstances on 20 March 1979.
- Walter Tobagi, killed by the Brigata XXVIII marzo (a far-left terrorist organization) on 28 May 1980.
- Giuseppe Fava, killed by the Mafia on 5 January 1984.
- Giancarlo Siani, killed by the Camorra on 23 September 1985.
- Mauro Rostagno, killed by the Mafia on 26 September 1988.
- Beppe Alfano, killed by the Mafia on 8 January 1993.

== Kazakhstan ==
- Askhat Sharipjanov, an editor of the website Navigator, was hit by a car in Almaty on 20 July 2004. The driver was found guilty of traffic violations and careless driving that resulted in a person's death, but Sharipjanov's colleagues believed it was contract murder.
- Oralgaisha Omarshanova, disappeared in 2007, body discovered in 2021.
- Gennady Pavlyuk (pen name: Ibragim Rustambek), editor-in-chief of Bely Parokhod, died in a hospital Almaty on 22 December 2009, six days after falling from a building with his hands and legs bound with tape. Two people were condemned for his murder.

== Kosovo ==
In Kosovo 15 journalists were killed or went missing between August 1998 and May 2005, during and in the aftermath of the Kosovo War. Among them at least seven Serbian journalists disappeared and are believed to have been killed.

- Radio journalist Djuro Slavuj and driver Ranko Perenic, two Serbs working for Radio Pristina, were on assignment on 21 August 1998, when they were abducted by a group of armed people with insignia of the Kosovo Liberation Army and disappeared.
- Afrim Maliqi, a Kosovo journalist working for the newspaper Bujku, was killed on 2 December 1998 in Pristina.
- On 11 January 1999, Enver Maloku, a Kosovo Albanian journalist, writer and head of the Kosovo Information Centre, was shot in Pristina.
- One Italian and one German journalist, Gabriel Grüner and Volker Krämer, were shot on 13 June 1999, near the village of Dulje, by Yugoslavian soldiers. Krämer died immediately, Grüner died later in a hospital in Tetovo, Macedonia.
- On 10 September 2000 Shefki Popova, an ethnic Albanian journalist working for the Rilindja newspaper was killed at the entrance of his house in Vučitrn. He was also active in local politics and in international cooperation. Motive remains unconfirmed.
- Journalist Bekim Kastrati was killed on 19 October 2001 while he was in his car with two other men: one of them was also killed and one was wounded. The motive is unconfirmed.
- Xhemail Mustafa, Kosovo journalist and advisor to the president Ibrahim Rugova, was killed by two unknown gunmen on 23 November 2000 in front of his apartment in Pristina.
- Bardhyl Ajeti was shot on 3 June 2005 in Kosovo and died from his wounds in an hospital in Milan on 28 June. No one has been condemned.

== Latvia ==
- Gundars Matiss died on 28 November 2001, from a brain hemorrhage after being attacked on 15 November.
- Grigorijs Ņemcovs, 2010

== Lithuania ==
- Vitas Lingis was shot dead on 12 October 1993.

== Malta ==
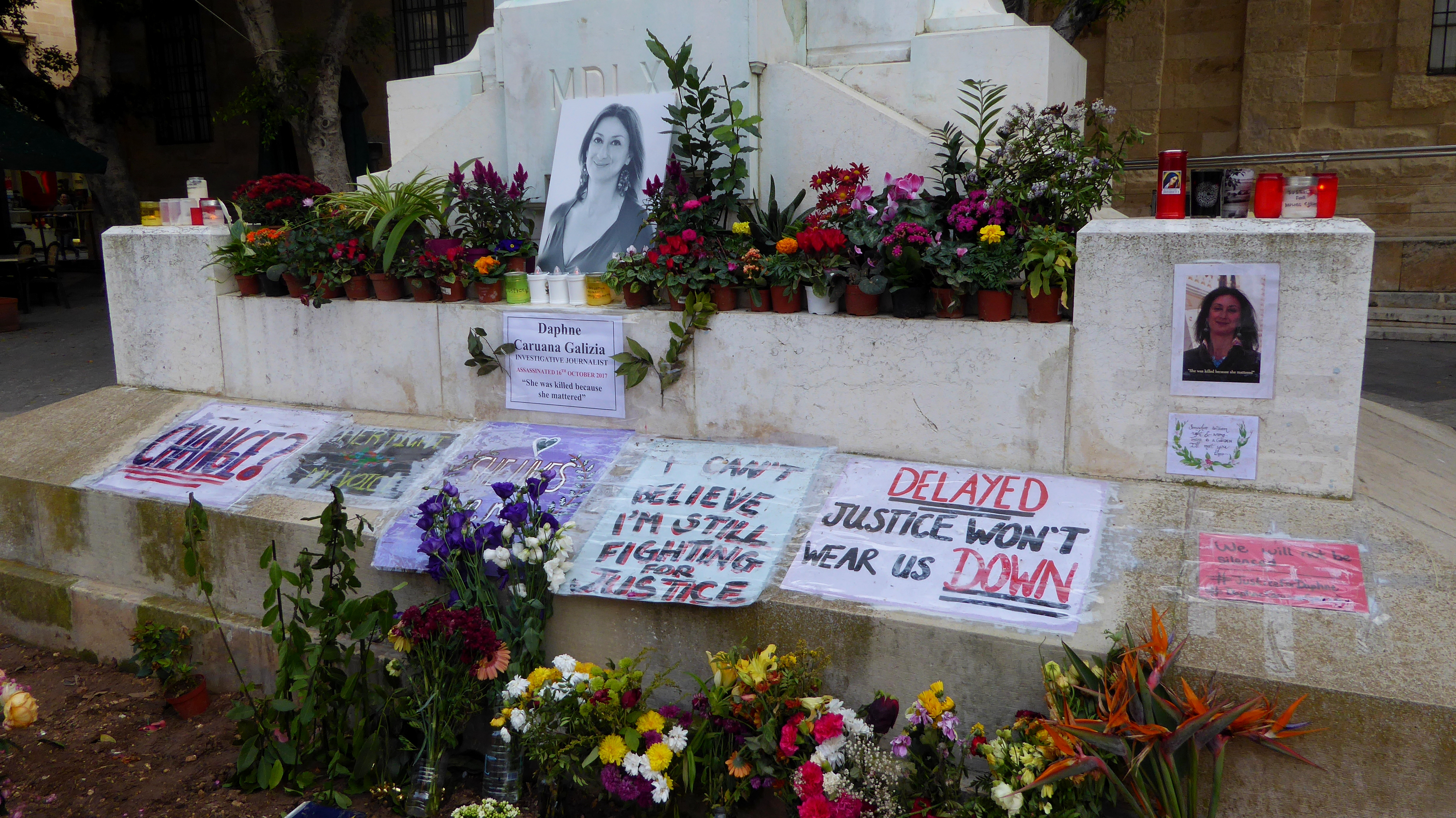
Daphne Caruana Galizia

- Maltese reporter Daphne Caruana Galizia was killed in a car bomb attack on 16 October 2017.

== Montenegro ==
- Duško Jovanović was killed on 27 May 2004. To this date, despite many attempts to do so, the case remains unresolved.

== Netherlands ==
- Dutch investigative journalist Peter R. de Vries was shot in Amsterdam on 6 July 2021 and died of his injuries on 15 July 2021.

== Poland ==
- 35-year-old TV journalist from Łódź Barbara Chrzczonowicz went missing on 16 December 1986. Presumed homicide.
- Jarosław Ziętara, a 24-year-old investigative journalist for regional daily newspaper Gazeta Poznańska was kidnapped on 1 September 1992 in Poznań and been killed in connection with his reporting on alleged corruption.
- 31-year-old local TV journalist from Łódź Iwona Mogiła-Lisowska went missing on 10 November 1992. Presumed homicide.
- Investigative journalist Marek Pomykała was kidnaped and killed on 29 April 1997 in Sanok. In 2022, Tadeusz Pająk, a former police officer, was arrested for murder. According to information from the prosecutor's office, the motive for the journalist's murder was his investigation into the suspect's connection to two murders in the 1980s.
- 52-year-old journalist based in Toruń Aleksandra Walczak went missing on 12 March 2004. Presumed homicide.
- Investigative journalist Łukasz Masiak was beaten to death in Mlawa on 14 June 2015.
- Journalist of Good Morning TVN TV programme Paweł Kiljański was killed on 27 March 2022. The search for Kamil Żyła suspected of murdering the journalist is ongoing. An Interpol Red Notice has been issued.

== Romania ==
- La Cinq reporter Jean-Louis Calderon died crushed by an army tank on the streets of Bucharest on 22 December 1989, while covering the uprising against the communist government.
- VTM reporter Danny Huwé was killed by snipers on 23 December 1989, while entering Bucharest by car.

== Russia ==
Hundreds of journalists have been killed in Russia since the 1990s.

== Serbia ==
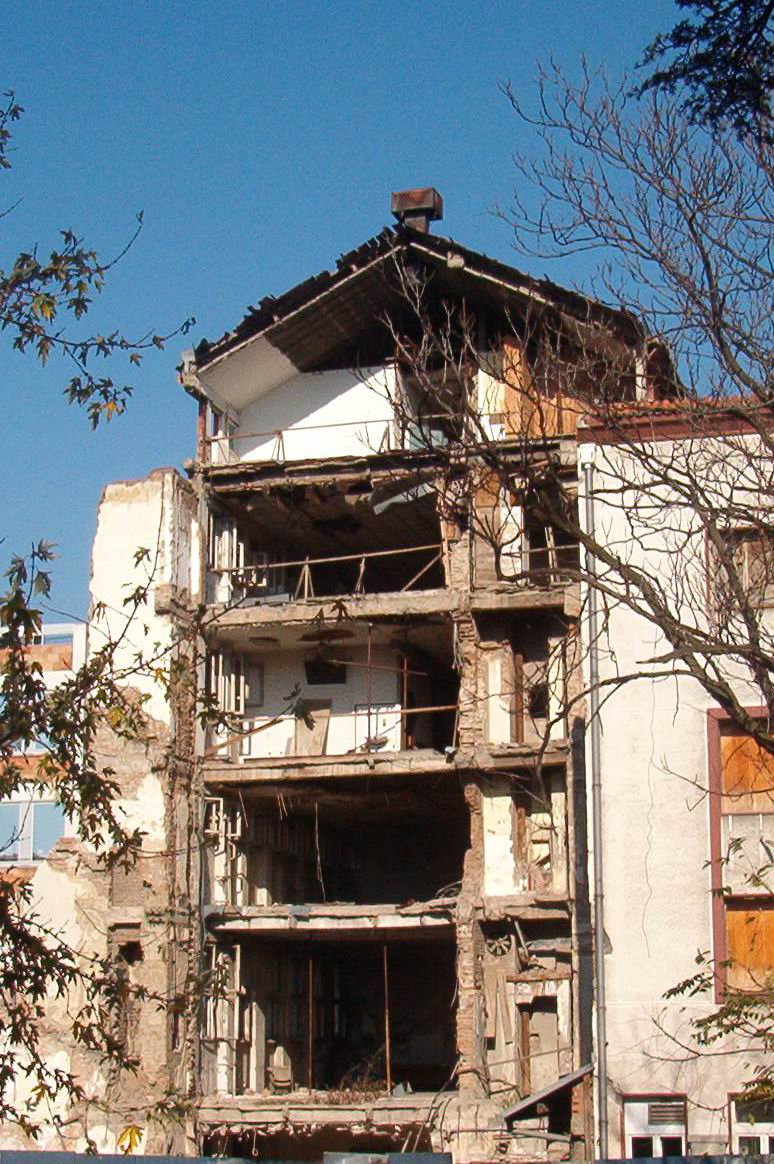
The headquarters of RTS after the NATO bombing

- Dada Vujasinović was found dead in her apartment on 8 April 1994. The police ruled it a suicide, but most evidence disputes this. Since January 2009, her death was regarded as a murder case, but no one has been arrested.
- Slavko Ćuruvija was murdered on 11 April 1999 in Belgrade. In November 2013 the Slavko Ćuruvija Foundation was established with the aim to preserve his heritage and advance media freedom in Serbia. A trial is ongoing but according to Veran Matić, president of the Commission for the Investigation of the Murder of Journalists in Serbia, the trial chamber is acting with the intent of acquitting those accused.
- On 23 April 1999 NATO bombed the headquarters of the Radio Television of Serbia, killing 16 employees, including technician Sinisa Medic.
- On 7 May 1999 three Chinese journalists died in the United States bombing of the Chinese embassy in Belgrade. American officials later claimed they were intelligence agents.
- Milan Pantić was killed on 11 June 2001 in Jagodina. The case is still unsolved but the commission led by Matić has collected new data.
- Broadcast journalist Luka Popov was killed in his home in the village of Srpski Krstur on 16 June 2016. A few days later three people were arrested.

== Slovakia ==
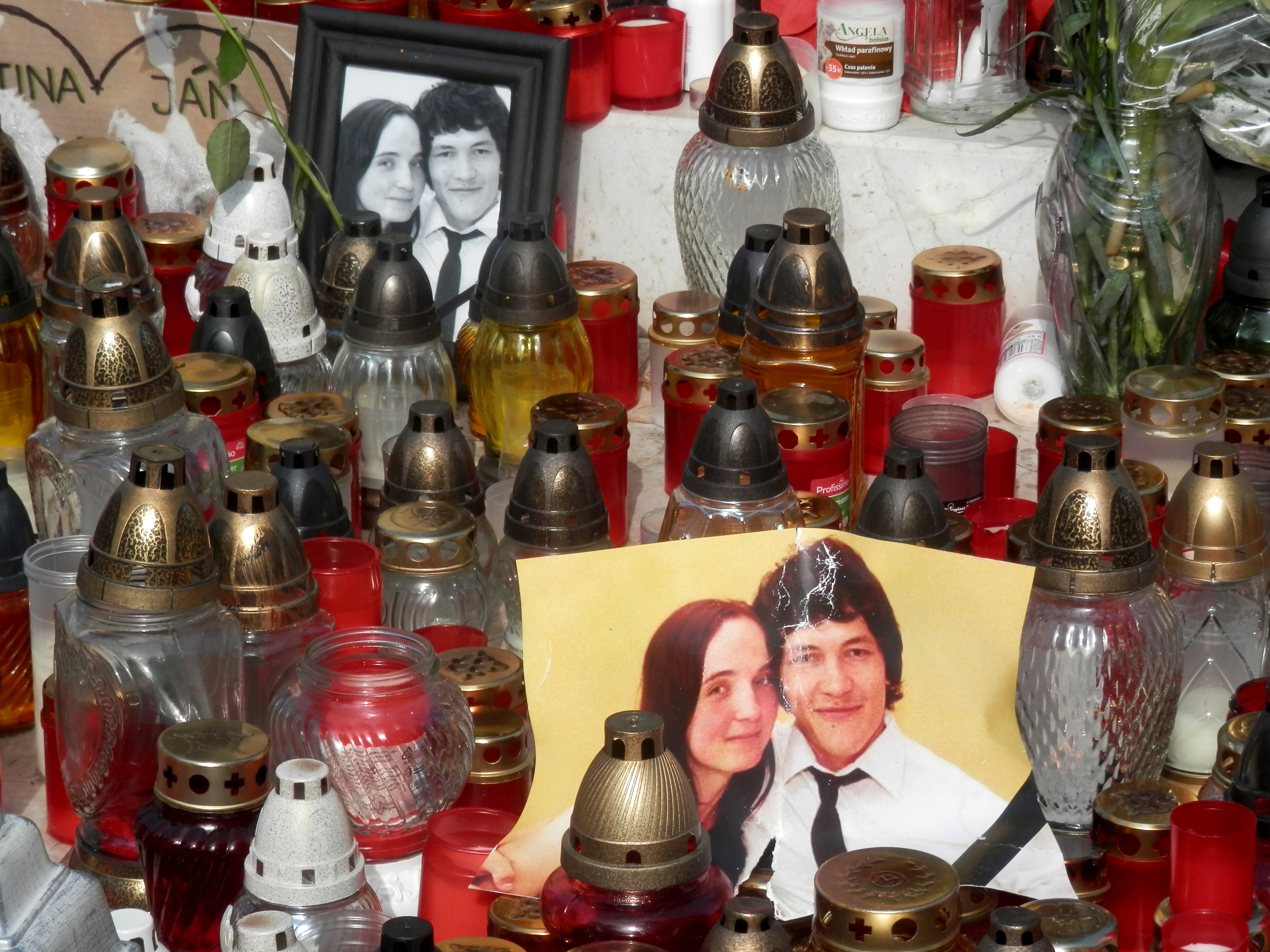
Ján Kuciak and his fiancée

- On 25 February 2018, the Slovak investigative reporter Ján Kuciak, 27, and his partner were found shot dead in their home in Veľká Mača, western Slovakia. "As a reporter for online news website Aktuality.sk, Kuciak wrote about serious economic crimes and illegal activities involving several high profile Slovak businessmen and their relations with top politicians", EUobserver reports, adding that "Kuciak was also working on a story linking prime minister Robert Fico's assistant with an Italian businessman in Slovakia. Among numerous tax frauds and public fund scandals, he covered the Panama Papers". The murder led to multiple protests organized under the "For decent Slovakia" movement.

== Slovenia ==
- Austrian-German news camera operator Nikolas Vogel was killed in a bomb incident on 28 June 1991 during the Ten-Day War along with his Austrian colleague Norbert Werner.

== South Ossetia ==
- Alexander Klimchuk (head of Caucasus Images) and Grigol Chikhladze (a freelance and member of Caucasus Images) were killed on 10 August 2008 when they tried to enter Tskhinvali.

== Spain ==
- Journalist Cristóbal Botella y Serra was killed in 1921.
- Journalist Luis de Sirval was killed in 1934.
- Journalist and politician Manuel Delgado Barreto was killed in 1936.
- Photographer Francisco Goñi was killed in 1936.
- Journalist Jaime Maestro Pérez was killed in 1936.
- Journalist Estanislao Rico Ariza was killed in 1936.
- Publisher and journalist Víctor Pradera Larumbe was killed in 1936.
- Religious publisher and journalist José Roca y Ponsa was killed in 1936.
- Priest and journalist Emilio Ruiz Muñoz was killed in 1936.
- Publisher and journalist Manuel Simó Marín was killed in 1936.
- Publisher, editor and journalist Juan Olazábal Ramery was killed in 1936.
- Publisher and editor Tomàs Caylà i Grau was killed in 1936.
- Sport journalist Paulino Martín García was killed in Madrid on 11 August 1977. No vindication and no prosecution.
- Journalist José María Portell was killed by ETA in 1978.
- Basque journalist Josu Muguruza was killed by a Spanish former police office member of a far-right organisation, 1989.
- Trade unionist and newspaper columnist José Luis López de Lacalle was killed on 7 May 2000 by ETA.

== Sweden ==
- Cats Falck, 1984

== United Kingdom ==
- Ross McWhirter, assassinated by the Provisional IRA on 27 November 1975.
- Bulgarian dissident writer and BBC journalist Georgi Markov died on 11 September 1978 after having been poisoned with a Bulgarian umbrella.
- British journalist Phillip Geddes was murdered by Provisional IRA in the Harrods bombing in London on 17 December 1983.
- English journalist and BBC presenter Jill Dando was shot dead in London on 26 April 1999. The case remain unsolved.
- Irish investigative journalist Martin O'Hagan was murdered by the Loyalist Volunteer Force in Northern Ireland on 28 September 2001.
- Investigative journalist Lyra McKee was shot dead by the New IRA in Creggan, Derry, Northern Ireland, on 18 April 2019. They claimed to have been shooting at Police Service of Northern Ireland officers and McKee was hit.

== Ukraine ==
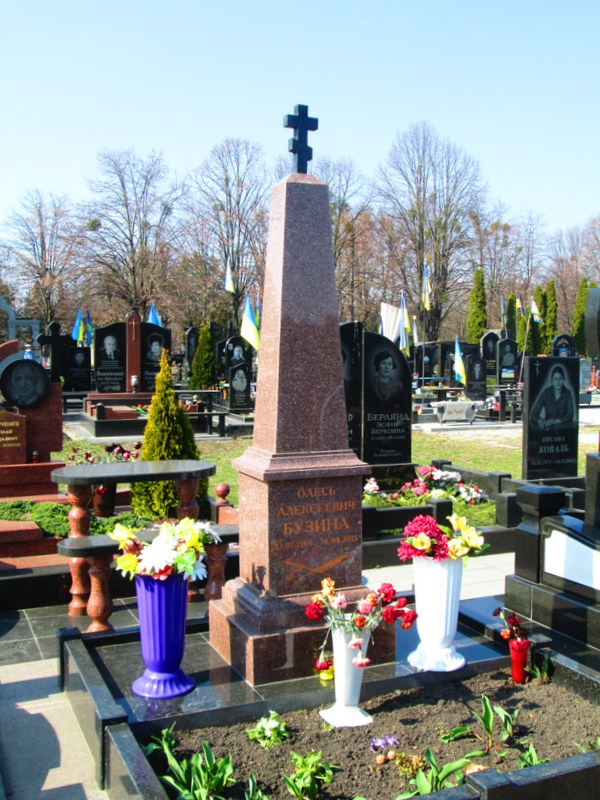
Ukrainian journalist Oles Buzina was shot dead by two masked gunmen near his house in Kyiv on 16 April 2015.

== See also ==
- Committee to Protect Journalists
- Freedom House
- Media freedom in the European Union
- Reporters Without Borders
