= Łukasz Masiak =

Polish journalist (c.1983–2015)

- Born: ca. 1983; Poland
- Died: 14 June 2015 (aged 31); Mława, Masovian Voivodeship, Poland
- Cause of death: Voluntary manslaughter (beating to death)
- Occupations: Publisher, editor, investigative journalist
- Employer: Nasza Mława
- Spouse: Wife
- Children: 2 children

Łukasz Masiak (ca. 1983 - 14 June 2015) was a Polish investigative journalist who founded and edited a local internet news portal Nasza Mława in Mława, Masovian Voivodeship, Poland, before his murder, which was suspected of being related to a story he had published on a mixed martial arts organization.

== Personal ==
Lukas Masiak was a native of a small town of Mlawa, Masovian Voivodeship, Poland. He lived there with his wife and two children, a four-year-old daughter and a four-month-old son. Masiak was active in the Association of Open Hearts (Polish: Stowarzyszenie Otwartych Serc), which assists children who are ill. He was 32 years old at the time of his murder.

=== Funeral ===
Several hundred people attended Masiak's funeral on 20 June 2015. He was cremated, and his urn was laid to rest in a cemetery at St. Lawrence. Father Jacek Marciniak, the priest who presided at the ceremony, did not address the circumstances of Masiak's death. Instead, he asked for donation and prayer intentions. The family of the deceased asked that mourners donate their money toward the treatment for 9-year-old cancer patient Iga Rudnicka.

== Career ==
Lukas Masiak worked as a journalist for Głos Mławy (Translated: Voice of Mława) before striking out on his own. In 2010, Masiak founded, edited and reported for the Nasza Mława (Translated: Our Mława). His web site NaszaMlawa.pl reported on many controversial issues, often involving businessmen, drugs, gypsies and even the botched investigation into the death of a young woman. He also reported on local mixed martial arts competitors, and was interested in not only their fight, but also the interests outside the MMA. The latter story was suspected of triggering his murderer.

He was considered one of the most recognized journalists in the region because of his ability to undertake controversial topics. His writing was seen as bold, honest, and creative, which made him highly regarded in the journalistic community.

== Death ==
Łukasz Masiak was murdered in Mlawa, Poland.

On 14 June 2015, at approximately 2 a.m., Masiak was attacked in the bathroom of a bowling alley in Mlawa. The perpetrator turned Masiak around, and used a powerful kick to Masiak's head. After the beating, he was left unconscious on the floor. He suffered a severe head injury, resulting in a brain hemorrhage. Medics spent almost an hour trying to revive Masiak until he died of his injuries.

=== Investigation ===
Masiak reported being threatened a number of times prior to his death. Some of these threats included letters and phone calls. In December 2014, he was sent his own obituary, and in January 2014, he was the victim of a physical assault near his home, claiming to have been tear gassed. Both of these cases were treated seriously, but investigators were unable to tie the occurrences to suspects. At the time of Masiak's death, the police arrested two suspects, but neither were the alleged perpetrator. The police released an arrest warrant for Bartosz Nowicki, a 29-year-old man who is an instructor at the local club martial arts MMA. In February 2016, Nowicki was arrested, interrogated and charged with murder because his testimony that the incident was an accident conflicted with the report on the case.

== Context ==
There was an increase in the deaths of journalists during 2015, which were related to terrorist attacks, unjustified arrests, assaults, harassment, threats and thought legal restrictions making it harder for editors, reporters, and photographers to efficiently make an account of the occurrences of the year. Even Poland, Masiak's home country, had plans to reform its media after so many attacks on journalists reporting on terrorism. However, these plans sparked concerns about editorial independence. The death of Masiak and others that have been killed have increased awareness across Europe that new rules surrounding the protection and safety of journalists are needed to ensure that right to report freely.

== Impact ==
Masiak was well known for his reporting on crime in Mlawa and the surrounding region. He covered controversial issues that few other reporters would cover, and he reported on local administration in the Mlawa town. His news portal was widely read across Mlawa, and an obituary on his news portal states was highly regarded by other journalists for his hard work, intuition, and honesty.

== Reactions ==
Irina Bokova, director-general of UNESCO, said, "I condemn the murder of Lukas Masiak. I call on the authorities to carry out a thorough investigation into this crime. Journalists play a vital role in protecting citizens’ rights to be informed and calling those in power to account. It is imperative that the perpetrators of this killing be brought to justice."

Dunja Mijatovic, OSCE Representative on Freedom of the Media, said, "This is a tragedy and a horrific reminder of the dangers journalists face around the world ... Journalists are increasingly targeted because of their profession and what they say and write, and this trend has to stop."

A statement from the Association of Polish Journalists said, "Lukasz Masiak was an esteemed and courageous journalist working for a local news portal. We are very saddened to learn of his death and deeply concerned that decisive response of law enforcement authorities comes only after the murder of the journalist."

The International Helsinki Federation for Human Rights also released a statement: "This is why the state is obliged to protect members of the media against threats in order to guarantee freedom of expression. What is more, public authorities must take adequate explanatory action to explain circumstances of any acts of violence directed against journalists. Therefore, it is crucial that any such incident, especially a tragedy like this one, be thoroughly investigated and explained and the perpetrators held accountable."

== See also ==
- Human rights in Poland
- List of journalists killed in Europe
