= Tigran Nagdalian =

Journalist

- Born: 8 June 1966; Yerevan, Armenia SSR
- Died: 28 December 2002 (aged 36); Yerevan, Armenia
- Occupation: Journalist

Tigran Naghdalian (Armenian: Տիգրան Նաղդալյան; 8 June 1966 – 28 December 2002) was an Armenian journalist, who was assassinated in Yerevan.

== Biography ==
Tigran Naghdalian was born in Yerevan, then Soviet Union.

From 1995 to 1997 he worked for Radio Free Europe/Radio Liberty. He was the head of the Armenian Public Television, where he also hosted a weekly news program. He was a friend and supporter of Robert Kocharyan, president of Armenia from 1998 to 2008. He was also considered an important witness in the trial of Nairi Hunanyan, the leader of the attack on the Armenian parliament in 1999.

== Death ==
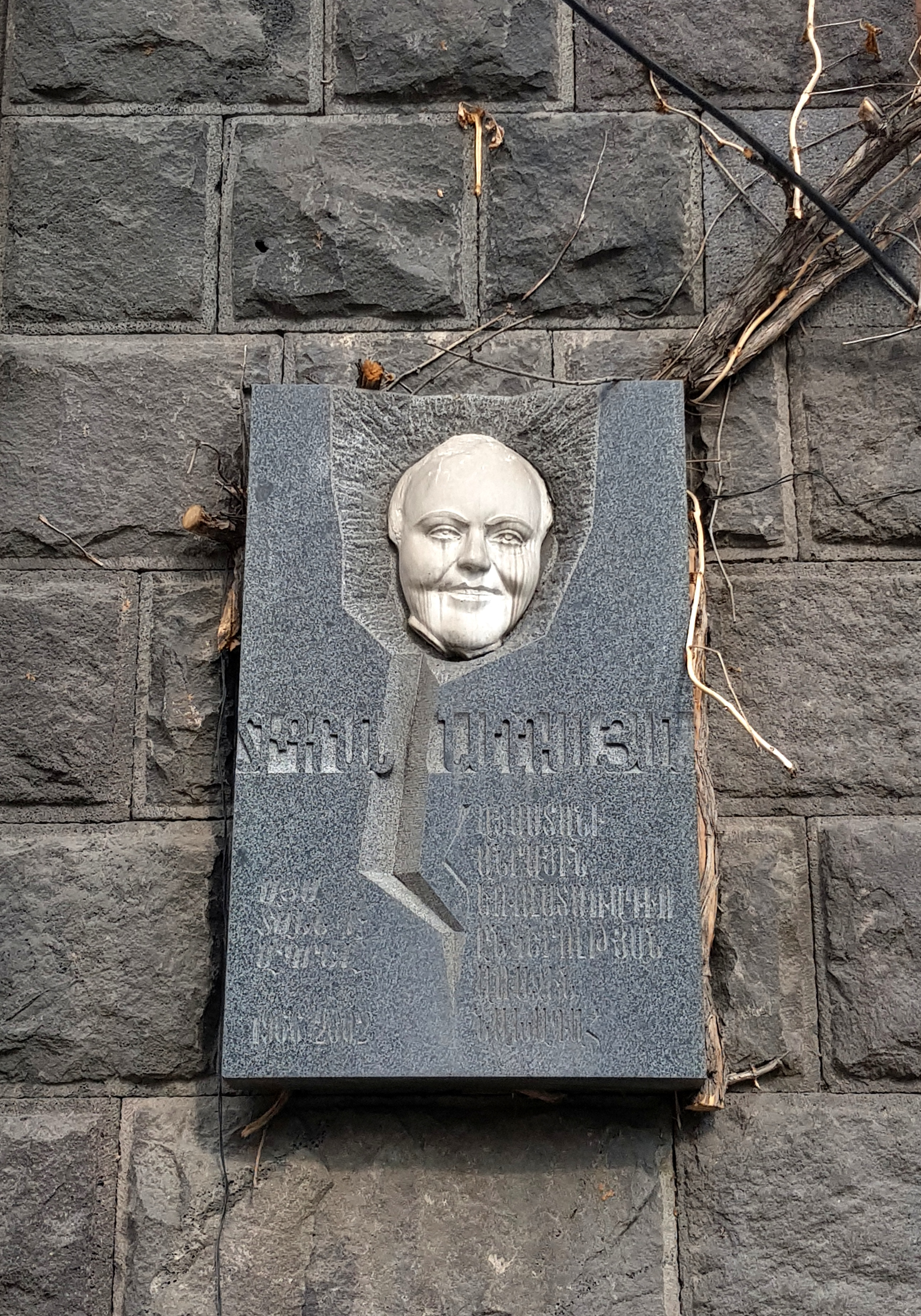
Commemorative plaque in Zakiyan Street in Yerevan

On 28 December 2002, Naghdalian was shot in the head by a group of supporters of the opposition at the entrance of the house of his parents in Yerevan and he died in hospital. He was 36 years old.

On 6 March 2003 Armenian police arrested six suspects. 13 people were charged with murder: seven were given sentences and six were acquitted. John Harutunian pleaded guilty of being the hitman. Businessman Armen Sargsyan, brother of Vazgen (former defence minister and prime minister, assassinated in 1999) and Aram Sargsyan (former prime minister) was found guilty of ordering the killing. They were both sentenced to 15 years of prison. Hovanes Harutunian was sentenced to 7 years as an intermediary (with a reduce sentence because of cooperation with the prosecution). The opposition claimed the arrest was political and that Armen Sargsyan was a scapegoat, arguing that he was instead killed because he knew too much about the 1999 attack on parliament.

On 8 June 2004 a memorial plaque was installed in Zakiyan Street in Yerevan.

== See also ==
- List of journalists killed in Europe
- Movses Khorenatsi medal
