= Spin (magazine) =

American music magazine

- Cover of the December 2024 issue, featuring Liam Gallagher and Noel Gallagher of Oasis
- Categories: Music
- Frequency: Quarterly
- Founder: Bob Guccione, Jr.
- First issue: May 1985; 41 years ago
- Company: Next Management Partners
- Country: United States
- Based in: New York City, New York, U.S.
- Language: English
- Website: spinmagazine.com
- ISSN: 0886-3032
- OCLC: 801245245

Spin (stylized in all caps as SPIN) is an American music magazine founded in 1985 by publisher Bob Guccione Jr. Later owned by Next Management Partners, the magazine has been an online publication since it stopped issuing a print edition in 2012. It returned as a quarterly publication in September 2024.

== History ==
=== Early history ===
Spin was established in 1985 by Bob Guccione, Jr. In August 1987, the publisher announced it would stop publishing Spin, but Guccione Jr. retained control of the magazine and partnered with former MTV president David H. Horowitz to quickly revive the magazine. During this time, it was published by Camouflage Publishing with Guccione Jr. as president and chief executive and Horowitz as investor and chairman.

In its early years, Spin was known for its narrow music coverage, with an emphasis on college rock, grunge, indie rock, and the ongoing emergence of hip-hop, while virtually ignoring other genres, such as country and metal. It also pointedly provided a national alternative to Rolling Stone's more establishment-oriented style. Spin prominently placed rising acts such as R.E.M., Prince, Run-D.M.C., Beastie Boys, and Talking Heads on its covers and did lengthy features on established figures such as Duran Duran, Keith Richards, Miles Davis, Aerosmith, Tom Waits, and John Lee Hooker.

On a cultural level, the magazine devoted significant coverage to punk, alternative country, electronica, reggae and world music, experimental rock, jazz of the most adventurous sort, burgeoning underground music scenes, and a variety of fringe styles. Artists such as the Ramones, Patti Smith, Blondie, X, Black Flag, and the former members of the Sex Pistols, The Clash, and the early punk and New Wave movements were heavily featured in Spin's editorial mix. Spin's extensive coverage of hip-hop music and culture, especially that of contributing editor John Leland, was notable at the time.

Editorial contributions by musical and cultural figures included Lydia Lunch, Henry Rollins, David Lee Roth and Dwight Yoakam. The magazine also reported on cities such as Austin, Texas, and Glasgow, Scotland, as cultural incubators in the independent music scene. A 1990 article on the contemporary country blues scene brought R. L. Burnside to national attention for the first time. Coverage of American cartoonists, manga, monster trucks, the AIDS crisis, outsider artists, Twin Peaks, and other non-mainstream cultural phenomena distinguished the magazine's early years. In July 1986, Spin published an exposé by Robert Keating on how the funds raised at the Live Aid concert might have been inappropriately used. Beginning in January 1988, Spin published a monthly series of articles about the AIDS epidemic titled "Words from the Front".

Kurt Cobain, Courtney Love, and their daughter Frances on Spin, December 1992

In 1990, Spin hired John Skipper in the new position of publishing director and president while Guccione, Jr. continued as editor and publisher. In the early 1990s, Spin played an influential role on the grunge era, featuring alternative rock artists such as "Nirvana and PJ Harvey on its covers when more mainstream magazines often failed to acknowledge them".

In 1994, two journalists working for the magazine were killed by a landmine while reporting on the Bosnian War in Bosnia and Herzegovina. A third, William T. Vollmann, was injured.

In 1997, Guccione Jr. left the magazine after selling Spin to Miller Publishing for $43.3 million. The new owner appointed Michael Hirschorn as editor-in-chief. A partnership made up of Robert Miller, David Salzman, and Quincy Jones, Miller Publishing also owned Vibe, which together made up Vibe/Spin Ventures. In 1999, Alan Light, who previously served as editor of Vibe succeeded Hirschorn at Spin.

=== Later years ===
Sia Michel was appointed editor-in-chief in early 2002 to succeed Light. With Michel as editor, according to Evan Sawdey of PopMatters, "Spin was one of the most funny, engaging music publications out there, capable of writing about everyone from the Used to Kanye West with an enthusiasm and deep-seated knowledge in genre archetypes that made for page-turning reading". In 2003, Spin sent Chuck Klosterman, a senior writer who joined the magazine in the 1990s, on a trip to visit the death sites of famous artists in rock music, which became the basis of his 2005 book, Killing Yourself to Live: 85% of a True Story. Klosterman wrote for Spin until 2006.

In February 2006, Miller Publishing sold the magazine to a San Francisco-based company called the McEvoy Group LLC, which was also the owner of Chronicle Books. The purchase price was reported to be "less than $5 million". That company formed Spin Media LLC as a holding company. The new owners appointed Andy Pemberton, a former editor at Blender, to succeed Michel as editor-in-chief. The first and only issue to be published under Pemberton's editorship was the July 2006 issue, which featured Beyoncé on the cover. Pemberton resigned from Spin in June 2006 and was succeeded by Doug Brod, who was executive editor during Michel's tenure.

In 2008, the magazine began publishing a complete digital edition of each issue. For the 25th anniversary of Prince's Purple Rain, in 2009, Spin released "a comprehensive oral history of the film and album and a free downloadable tribute that features nine bands doing song-for-song covers of the record".

In March 2010, the entire collection of Spin magazine back issues became freely readable on Google Books. Brod remained editor until June 2011, when he was replaced by Steve Kandell, who previously was deputy editor. In July 2011, for the 20th anniversary of Nirvana's 1991 album, Nevermind, the magazine released a tribute album including all 13 songs with each covered by a different artist. The album, released for free on Facebook, included covers by Butch Walker, Amanda Palmer and Titus Andronicus.

With the March 2012 issue, Spin relaunched the magazine in a larger, bi-monthly format and, at the same time, expanded its online presence under digital general manager Jeff Rogers. In July 2012, Spin was sold to Buzzmedia, which eventually renamed itself SpinMedia, which was founded in 1999 by Anthony Batt and Marc Brown. The September/October 2012 issue was the magazine's last print edition. It continued to publish entirely online with Caryn Ganz as its editor-in-chief. In June 2013, Ganz was succeeded by Jem Aswad, who was replaced by Craig Marks in June of the following year.

In 2016, Puja Patel was appointed editor and Eldridge Industries acquired SpinMedia via the Hollywood Reporter-Billboard Media Group for an undisclosed amount. Matt Medved became editor in December 2018.

Spin was acquired in 2020 by Next Management Partners. Jimmy Hutcheson is chief executive officer with Daniel Kohn as editorial director and Spin's founder, Guccione Jr., who rejoined the magazine as creative advisor.

In late 2023, the publication received backlash for Guccione Jr.'s article defending former Rolling Stone editor Jann Wenner after the latter made racist and sexist comments that got him ousted from the Rock and Roll Hall of Fame board of directors as well as for "Stand Together Music", an initiative used "to launder the reputation of Koch Industries". In 2024 its week-long activation at the South by Southwest conference was sponsored by the United States Army, one of the factors that led to over 100 bands dropping off the festival in protest.

In May 2024, the magazine announced it would relaunch its print edition and publish quarterly starting in August.

== Books ==
In 1995, Spin produced its first book, entitled Spin Alternative Record Guide. It compiled writings by 64 music critics on recording artists and bands relevant to the alternative music movement, with each artist's entry featuring their discography and albums reviewed and rated a score between one and ten. According to Pitchfork's Matthew Perpetua, the book featured "the best and brightest writers of the 80s and 90s, many of whom started off in zines but have since become major figures in music criticism," including Rob Sheffield, Byron Coley, Ann Powers, Simon Reynolds, and Alex Ross. Although the book was not a sales success, "it inspired a disproportionate number of young readers to pursue music criticism." After the book was published, its entry on 1960s folk artist John Fahey, written by Byron Coley, helped renew interest in Fahey's music, leading to interest from record labels and the alternative music scene.

For Spin's 20th anniversary in 2005, it published a book, Spin: 20 Years of Alternative Music, chronicling the prior two decades in music. The book has essays on grunge, Britpop, and emo, among other genres of music, as well as pieces on musical acts including Marilyn Manson, Tupac Shakur, R.E.M., Nirvana, Weezer, Nine Inch Nails, Limp Bizkit, and the Smashing Pumpkins.

== Year-end lists ==
SPIN began compiling year-end lists in 1990.

=== Artist of the Year ===
Year	Artist	Ref.
1994	The Smashing Pumpkins	
1995	PJ Harvey	
1996	Beck	
1997	The Notorious B.I.G.	
1998	Lauryn Hill	
1999	Rage Against the Machine	
2000	Eminem	
2001	U2	
2002	The Strokes	
2003	Coldplay	
2004	Modest Mouse	
2005	M.I.A.	
2006	Artists on YouTube and MySpace	
2007	Kanye West and Daft Punk	
2008	Lil Wayne	
2009	Kings of Leon	
2010	LCD Soundsystem, Florence and the Machine, and The Black Keys	
2011	Fucked Up	
2012	Death Grips	
2013	Mike Will Made It	
2014	Sia	
2015	Deafheaven	
2019	Billie Eilish	
2020	Run the Jewels	
2021	Turnstile	
2022	Weyes Blood	
2023	Sinéad O'Connor	
2024	Finneas	
2025	Deftones	

=== Single of the Year ===
Year	Artist	Song	Nation	Ref.
1994	Beck	"Loser"	United States	
1995	Moby	"Feeling So Real"	United States	
1996	Fugees	"Ready or Not"	United States	
1997	The Notorious B.I.G.	"Hypnotize"	United States	
1998	Fatboy Slim	"The Rockafeller Skank"	England	
1999	TLC	"No Scrubs"	United States	
2000	Eminem	"The Real Slim Shady"	United States	
2001	Missy Elliott	"Get Ur Freak On"	United States	
2002	Eminem	"Cleanin' Out My Closet"	United States	
2003	50 Cent	"In da Club"	United States	
2004	Green Day	"American Idiot"	United States	
2005	Gorillaz	"Feel Good Inc."	England	
2006	Gnarls Barkley	"Crazy"	United States	
2007	Kanye West	"Stronger"	United States	
2008	M.I.A.	"Paper Planes"	England	
2009	Yeah Yeah Yeahs	"Zero"	United States	
2010	CeeLo Green	"Fuck You"	United States	
2011	Adele	"Rolling in the Deep"	England	
2012	GOOD Music	"Mercy"	United States	
2013	Daft Punk	"Get Lucky"	France	
2014	Future Islands	"Seasons (Waiting on You)"	United States	
2015	Justin Bieber	"What Do You Mean?"	Canada	
2016	Rae Sremmurd	"Black Beatles"	United States	
2017	Calvin Harris, Frank Ocean, and Migos	"Slide"	Scotland	
2018	Valee and Jeremih	"Womp Womp"	United States	
2019	Big Thief	"Orange"	United States	
2020	Bartees Strange	"Boomer"	United States	
2021	Japanese Breakfast	"Be Sweet"	United States	
2022	Sudan Archives	"Home Maker"	United States	
2023	Boygenius	"Not Strong Enough"	United States	

=== Album of the Year ===
Year	Artist	Album	Nation	Ref.
1990	Ice Cube	AmeriKKKa's Most Wanted	United States	
1991	Teenage Fanclub	Bandwagonesque	Scotland	
1992	Pavement	Slanted and Enchanted	United States	
1993	Liz Phair	Exile in Guyville	United States	
1994	Hole	Live Through This	United States	
1995	Moby	Everything is Wrong	United States	
1996	Beck	Odelay	United States	
1997	Cornershop	When I Was Born for the 7th Time	England	
1998	Lauryn Hill	The Miseducation of Lauryn Hill	United States	
1999	Nine Inch Nails	The Fragile	United States	
2000	Radiohead	Kid A	England	
2001	System of a Down	Toxicity	United States	
2002	The White Stripes	White Blood Cells	United States	
2003	The White Stripes	Elephant	United States	
2004	Kanye West	The College Dropout	United States	
2005	Kanye West	Late Registration	United States	
2006	TV on the Radio	Return to Cookie Mountain	United States	
2007	Against Me!	New Wave	United States	
2008	TV on the Radio	Dear Science	United States	
2009	Animal Collective	Merriweather Post Pavilion	United States	
2010	Kanye West	My Beautiful Dark Twisted Fantasy	United States	
2011	Fucked Up	David Comes to Life	Canada	
2012	Frank Ocean	Channel Orange	United States	
2013	Kanye West	Yeezus	United States	
2014	The War on Drugs	Lost in the Dream	United States	
2015	Kendrick Lamar	To Pimp A Butterfly	United States	
2016	Solange Knowles	A Seat at the Table	United States	
2017	Kendrick Lamar	Damn	United States	
2018	The 1975	A Brief Inquiry into Online Relationships	England	
2019	Big Thief	Two Hands	United States	
2020	Fiona Apple	Fetch the Bolt Cutters	United States	
2021	Turnstile	Glow On	United States	
2022	Weyes Blood	And in the Darkness, Hearts Aglow	United States	
2023	Killer Mike	Michael	United States	

Note: The 2000 album of the year was awarded to "your hard drive", acknowledging the impact that filesharing had on the music listening experience in 2000. Kid A was listed as number 2, the highest ranking given to an actual album.

Additionally, the following albums were selected by the magazine as the best albums of their respective years in retrospective lists published decades later for years prior to the magazine's 1990 introduction of year-end album lists:

Year	Artist	Album	Nation	Ref.
1971	Led Zeppelin	Led Zeppelin IV	England	
1981	King Crimson	Discipline	England	
1982	Kate Bush	The Dreaming	England	
