= Rasim Aliyev =

Azerbaijani journalist and human rights activist

- Born: August 16, 1984; Baku, Azerbaijan SSR, USSR
- Died: August 9, 2015 (aged 30); Baku, Azerbaijan
- Occupation: Journalist
- Organization(s): Institute for Reporters’ Freedom and Safety
- Known for: Journalism and activism

Rasim Aliyev (Azerbaijani: Əliyev Rasim Məmmədəli oğlu; 16 August 1984 – 9 August 2015) was a journalist and human rights activist in Azerbaijan. He was a member of the Institute for Reporters’ Freedom and Safety (IRFS). After a football match between a Cypriot and an Azerbaijani football club, Aliyev criticized national player Javid Huseynov for being "ill-bred". Aliyev was later lured to a meeting with someone claiming to be a relative of Huseynov seeking reconciliation, where he was brutally beaten by several assailants. Aliyev died in hospital the following day, a week shy of his 31st birthday.

== Life ==
Rasim Aliyev was born on 16 August 1984. He was a graduate of the Azerbaijan State Oil Academy.

He began working for the Institute for Reporters’ Freedom and Safety (IRFS) since 2007, becoming its chairman in October 2014. In the early stages of his career with IRFS, Aliyev was a researcher of human rights and monitored the local courts of Azerbaijan. Aliyev underwent growing pressure from IRFS opponents and in 2013, he was beaten. The incident was photographed and the image became widely known.

Employed by the IRFS's television channel Objective TV as an editor in 2010. Objective TV was an independent online news source which regularly reported on issues concerning human rights. Objective TV was forcefully shut down in August 2014 by Azerbaijani law authorities.

In July 2015, Aliyev published photographs of police brutality. He then received numerous death threats and blackmail. Aliyev appealed to law enforcement for protection, but none was ever granted.

== Death ==
After a football match played in Cyprus between the Azeri team Gabala FK and the Cypriot team Apollon Limassol, Rasim Aliyev criticized Javid Huseynov, a national player for Azerbaijan, for waving a Turkish flag at Cypriot fans and making a crude hand gesture to a journalist who questioned the act. In a Facebook post, Aliyev demanded that Huseynov be banned from playing football. He also called Huseynov "immoral and ill-bred" for making such a gesture.

In Baku, Aliyev took a phone call from a man claiming to be a relative of Huseynov, who expressed anger toward Aliyev for his criticism of the footballer. Aliyev later agreed to meet the man in a gesture of reconciliation, but at the meeting place was forcibly held down in the street by six men, kicked and beaten for about 40 seconds, and robbed. Aliyev was taken to hospital where he was diagnosed with four broken ribs and ear damage but no internal injuries, and gave an interview to the media. His condition worsened overnight and his spleen was removed. He died on 9 August 2015, the day after the attack, from internal bleeding.

While the attackers were allegedly football fans, colleagues of Aliyev have cautioned against this explanation, suggesting the attack may have been politically motivated. The Institute for Reporters' Freedom and Safety has further claimed that doctors "refused to objectively diagnose [Aliyev] or place him under serious medical supervision in the intensive care unit", which they blame on alleged pressure from Azerbaijani authorities.

On 31 May 2016, the court sentenced several people involved in his murder, Elshan Ismailov received 13 years of imprisonment, Arif Aliyev - 12.5, Jamal Mammadov - 11, Samir Mustafayev and Kyanan Madatov - 9 each and the player Javid Huseynov - 4 years.

== International condemnation ==
The death of Rasim Aliyev sparked worldwide condemnation by numerous international organizations including European Federation of Journalists, International Federation of Journalists, International Association of Press Clubs, Institute for Reporters' Freedom and Safety, Sport for Rights organization, and Index for Censorship. The Director-General of UNESCO, Irina Bokova, condemned the attack and demanded a thorough investigation into his death. OSCE representative Dunja Mijatović condemned the attack in a letter to Azerbaijan's president Ilham Aliyev: "The latest tragic death of Rasim Aliyev is the ultimate reminder to all of us that the vicious circle has to be broken and something has to be done." Natalia Nozadze, a representative of Amnesty International, has called upon Ilham Aliyev and the Azerbaijani government "to ensure a truly thorough, independent and impartial investigation is immediately undertaken into the death of Rasim Aliyev. Freedom of expression in Azerbaijan is already on life support. The authorities need to act now and effectively protect journalists at risk if that freedom is not to become extinct."

== Personal life ==
Rasim Aliyev was engaged and planned to get married. He had one sister.

== See also ==
- List of journalists killed in Europe
