= Gordan Lederer =

- Born: 21 April 1958; Zagreb, PR Croatia, FPR Yugoslavia
- Died: 9 August 1991 (aged 33); Hrvatska Kostajnica, Croatia
- Occupations: Photographer, cameraman, cinematographer
- Spouse: Ana Lederer
- Children: Petra Lederer
- Relatives: Prvislav Lederer (father); Vlasta Lederer (mother)
- Awards: Order of Petar Zrinski and Fran Krsto Frankopan

Gordan Lederer (21 April 1958 – 9 August 1991) was a Croatian photographer and Croatian Radiotelevision cameraman killed during the Croatian War of Independence.

== Biography ==
Lederer was born in Zagreb on 21 April 1958. His mother, Vlasta Lederer, was physician at the Zagreb hospital "Sveti Duh". After elementary and high school in Zagreb, he graduated photojournalism at the Yugoslav Journalism Institute in Belgrade. From 1983, Lederer studied film and television recording at the Academy of Dramatic Art, University of Zagreb from where he graduated in 1989.

In 1986, Lederer started studying archeology at the Faculty of Humanities and Social Sciences, University of Zagreb, and in 1989 he began postgraduate education at Inter-University Centre in Dubrovnik. During his studies, with colleague Mojmír Konič, he produced 35 mm animated film Muybridge and comp. The film earned the International Animated Film Association Award for Best Film at the 33rd Yugoslav Documentary and Short Film Festival in Belgrade.

From 1986 to 1989, Lederer worked as a cameraman on the animation films The Elm-Chanted Forest and The Magician's Hat. During that period, he made several animated video clips. As a photojournalist he worked for Vjesnik, Borba and Politika. From 1988 until his death, he was member of the Society of filmmakers. From 1987 until his death, Lederer worked as a cameraman for Croatian Radiotelevision.

As a cinematographer, in 1987, he filmed for TV Zagreb (now Croatian Radiotelevision) documentaries "Udruženje samaca" and "Badanj". Besides his regular work as cameraman and screenwriter, in cooperation with Dražzen Šimić since 1989 to 1990, he has conducted a series of independent clips about archaeology, history and travels. In 1990, he was the cinematographer of a documentary film Tunguska katastrofa about the Tunguska event.

Along with his work on documentaries, he also gained experience as a war cameraman in 1991 while recording on the Iran-Iraq border for the documentary "Kurdska kolijevka traži utočište".

== Family ==
Lederer and his wife, Ana, had one child, a daughter, Petra.

== Death ==
From the very beginning of the war in Croatia, Lederer filmed on all Croatian crisis spots as a cameraman for Croatian Radiotelevision. He filmed in Knin, Pakrac, Borovo Selo, Vukovar and Banovina.

On 9 August 1991, while filming Croatian soldiers in action in Banovina, he was struck by a sniper bullet fired from Rosulja near Hrvatska Kostajnica by a Serb sniper, Milan Zorić. His camera recorded the whole event.

As his body fell down the slope, he was hit by a Mortar shell whose shrapnel also wounded him.

Lederer died in the car on the way to Zagreb, as Andrija Rašeta, Yugoslav People's Army general of the V. military region, refused to authorize helicopter flight to transport Lederer to the hospital in Zagreb. He was buried at the Mirogoj Cemetery.

After her son's death, Lederer's mother. Vlasta, wrote a letter published in the Croatian daily newspaper Vjesnik on 14 August 1991:

I hereby announce publicly that my son Gordan Lederer was treacherously murdered on 9th August 1991, by a mercenary gang of Chetniks while holding a camera in his hand, and that, thanks to the Chetnik collaborator, General Rašeta, he was denied any chance of survival.

In 1999, Milan Zorić was convicted in absentia at the County Court in Sisak for the murder of Lederer. On 18 September 2002, Zorić appealed at the Supreme Court of Croatia. The Supreme Court dismissed the charges against Zorić and the military court in Zagreb terminated the criminal proceedings following the application of the 1996 Amnesty Law.

== Honors ==
In 1993, Lederer was posthumously awarded with the Special Award by the Croatian Journalists' Association for outstanding service in the field of journalism during Croatian War of Independence. On the recommendation by the Vladimir Nazor Award committee, Lederer was awarded posthumously for his work with Special Award by Croatian Ministry of Culture. In 1996, he was awarded with the Order of Petar Zrinski and Fran Krsto Frankopan.

== See also ==
- List of journalists killed in Europe
