= Victoria Marinova =

Bulgarian journalist and TV host (1988–2018)

- Виктория Маринова
- Born: 19 August 1988
- Died: 6 October 2018 (aged 30); Ruse, Bulgaria
- Occupation: Journalist
- Spouse: Svilen Maksimov
- Children: 1

Victoria Marinova (Bulgarian: Виктория Маринова; 19 August 1988 – 6 October 2018) was a Bulgarian TV host and journalist. She was raped and murdered at age 30. Her death caused international outrage during a time of increased violence against investigative reporters.

== Career ==
Marinova was the administrative director of TVN Television in Ruse. She presented a current affairs talk programme called Detector for Ruse's TVN television which had recently been relaunched. The first episode of the show on September 30 included with investigative journalists Dimitar Stoyanov and Attila Biro, about an investigation of alleged fraud with EU funds linked to big businessmen and politicians. The second episode that had been planned to air afterwards would have covered the Hitrino train derailment accident, which resulted in the death of 7 people and injured more than 29 others. According to Bulgarian investigative journalists, the same companies that had been involved with the alleged fraud with EU funds, had also won a public procurement deal in the Hitrino case. Among the suspects are Russian citizens, associated with the Bulgarian division of "Lukoil".

== Death ==
In the afternoon of 7 October 2018, Marinova's body was found in a riverside park in Ruse, which is a popular walking and jogging spot for the citizens of the town. She had been beaten and raped before being murdered, which occurred around noon of that Saturday. Marinova was the third journalist killed in the European Union in less than a year, after Daphne Caruana Galizia from Malta, and Jan Kuciak and his fiancée from Slovakia. 21-year-old Severin Krasimirov, who had fled to Germany, pled guilty to raping and murdering her and was sentenced on 23 April 2019 to 30 years in prison. Prosecutors stated that the attack appeared to be a random sexual assault unconnected to Marinova's work as a journalist.

== See also ==
- List of journalists killed in Europe
