= Philippe Labarde =

French economic journalist and writer (1939–2026)

- Born: 26 September 1939; Agen, France
- Died: 16 June 2026 (aged 86); Paris, France
- Education: Lycée Buffon
- Occupations: Journalist; Writer

Philippe Labarde (French: [filˈip labˈaʁd]; 26 September 1939 – 16 June 2026) was a French economic journalist and writer.

A graduate of the Lycée Buffon, he joined Le Monde in 1968, where he worked on and off until his nomination to the Conseil supérieur de l'audiovisuel in 1995.

Labarde died in Paris on 16 June 2026, at the age of 86.

== Publications ==
- Ah Dieu ! que la guerre économique est jolie ! (1998)
- La Bourse ou la vie. La grande manipulation des petits actionnaires (2000)
- Malheur aux vaincus : Ah, si les riches pouvaient rester entre riches (2000)
- Pour ou contre l'Europe fédérale (2002)
- La photo à la Une : Paris-soir France-soir (2006)
