= Commission de la carte d'identité des journalistes professionnels =

French government commission

The Commission de la carte d'identité des journalistes professionnels (CCiJP) is an official French government commission, composed of 30 reliable persons concerning the press. It rules on the credentials of French journalists. They produce an annual card with a specific number to each member. This allows professional journalists to enter or/and to pass barriers made by the authorities in order to allow communication and press releases. It also gives free entrance to most museums, exhibitions, theaters, cinema, etc.
