= Charia Hebdo =

Edition of the French journal Charlie Hebdo

Issue No. 1011 cover of Charlie Hebdo, renamed Charia Hebdo ("Sharia Hebdo"). The speech balloon shows Muhammad saying, "100 lashes of the whip if you don't die laughing!"

Charlie Hebdo issue No. 1011 is an issue of the French satirical newspaper Charlie Hebdo published on 2 November 2011. Several attacks against Charlie Hebdo, including an arson attack at its headquarters, were motivated by the issue's cover caricature of Muhammad, whose depiction is prohibited in some interpretations of Islam. The issue's subtitle Charia Hebdo references Islamic sharia law.

== Charia Hebdo ==
On 31 October 2011, issue No. 1011 of the satirical French newspaper Charlie Hebdo left the presses two days before its official publication date. The issue was retitled Charia Hebdo in facetious celebration of Tunisian Islamist party Ennahda's achieving a plurality of the vote and forming a government after the 2011 Tunisian Constituent Assembly election. The issue elicited mixed reactions in social media. Muhammad, the founder of Islam, appears on the cover saying, "100 lashes if you do not die laughing!" in a caricature by cartoonist Luz.

The issue announced, "To fittingly celebrate the victory of the Islamist Ennahda party in Tunisia ... Charlie Hebdo has asked Muhammad to be the special editor-in-chief of its next issue", the magazine said in a statement ... "The prophet of Islam didn't have to be asked twice and we thank him for it." It featured an editorial purportedly by Muhammad "Halal Aperitif" and a women's supplement called "Madam Sharia". Around 110,000 copies were sold of the issue on its day of publication and its management announced a reprinting.

== Attacks ==
=== Arson at the Charlie Hebdo offices ===
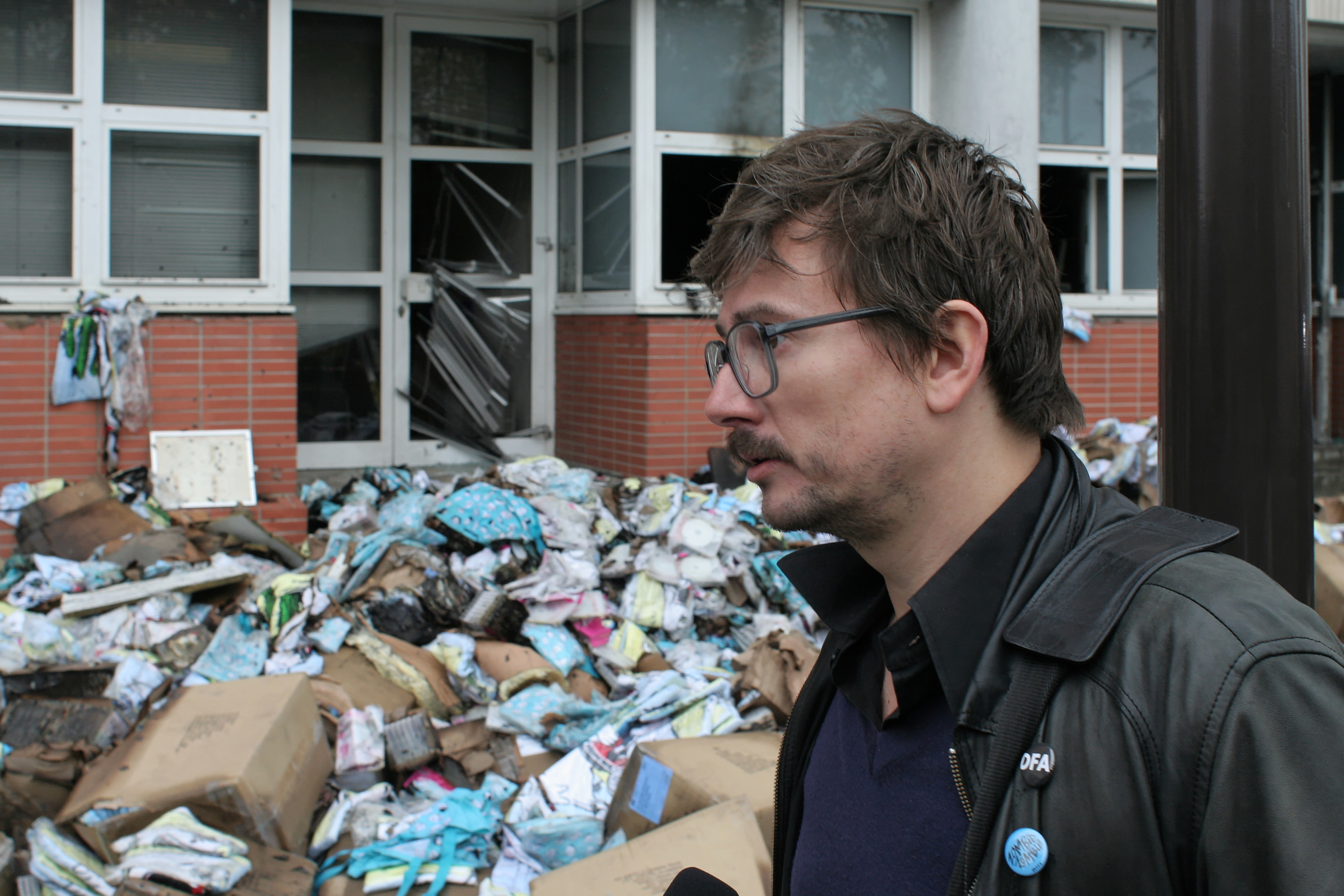
Cartoonist Luz in front of the burned offices of Charlie Hebdo after the arson of 2 November 2011

During the night of 1 November 2011, the Charlie Hebdo offices at 62 Boulevard Davout in the 20th arrondissement of Paris were burned down with a Molotov cocktail. Patrick Pelloux, who writes a column for the weekly, announced that "everything was destroyed". Charlie Hebdo management said the fire was related to the publication of Charia Hebdo, and added they had "received quite a few letters of protest, threats, and insults on Twitter and Facebook".

Nicolas Demorand, the managing editor of the newspaper Libération, invited the Charlie Hebdo staff to set themselves up in the Libération offices. The following day, a four-page supplement dedicated to the cartoons of Charlie Hebdo appeared in Libération.

On 3 November, Charlie Hebdo's manager Charb, managing editor Riss, and cartoonist Luz were placed under police protection.

=== Hacking of the Charlie Hebdo website ===
Charlie Hebdo's website was hacked twice on the day of the issue's publication. The welcome page was replaced by a message in English and Turkish saying, "You keep abusing Islam's almighty Prophet with disgusting and disgraceful cartoons using excuses of freedom of speech. ... Be God's Curse On You! We will be Your Curse on Cyber World!"

The following day, the Turkish hacker group Akıncılar took credit for the attack. The group targets publications that it believes attacks its values or that it deems "pornographic or Satanic". The group asserted it had nothing to do with the burning of the Charlie Hebdo offices, and that it did not support acts of violence.

On 3 November, the company Bluevision, which hosted the site, refused to put it back online following death threats it received. The following day Charlie Hebdo began a blog at charliehebdo.wordpress.com.

=== Threats on the Charlie Hebdo Facebook page ===
Facebook suspended Charlie Hebdo's page on the site after users left numerous threatening messages on it. Facebook's official explanation was that Charlie Hebdo was not an actual person, and that the page contravened rules proscribing graphic content.

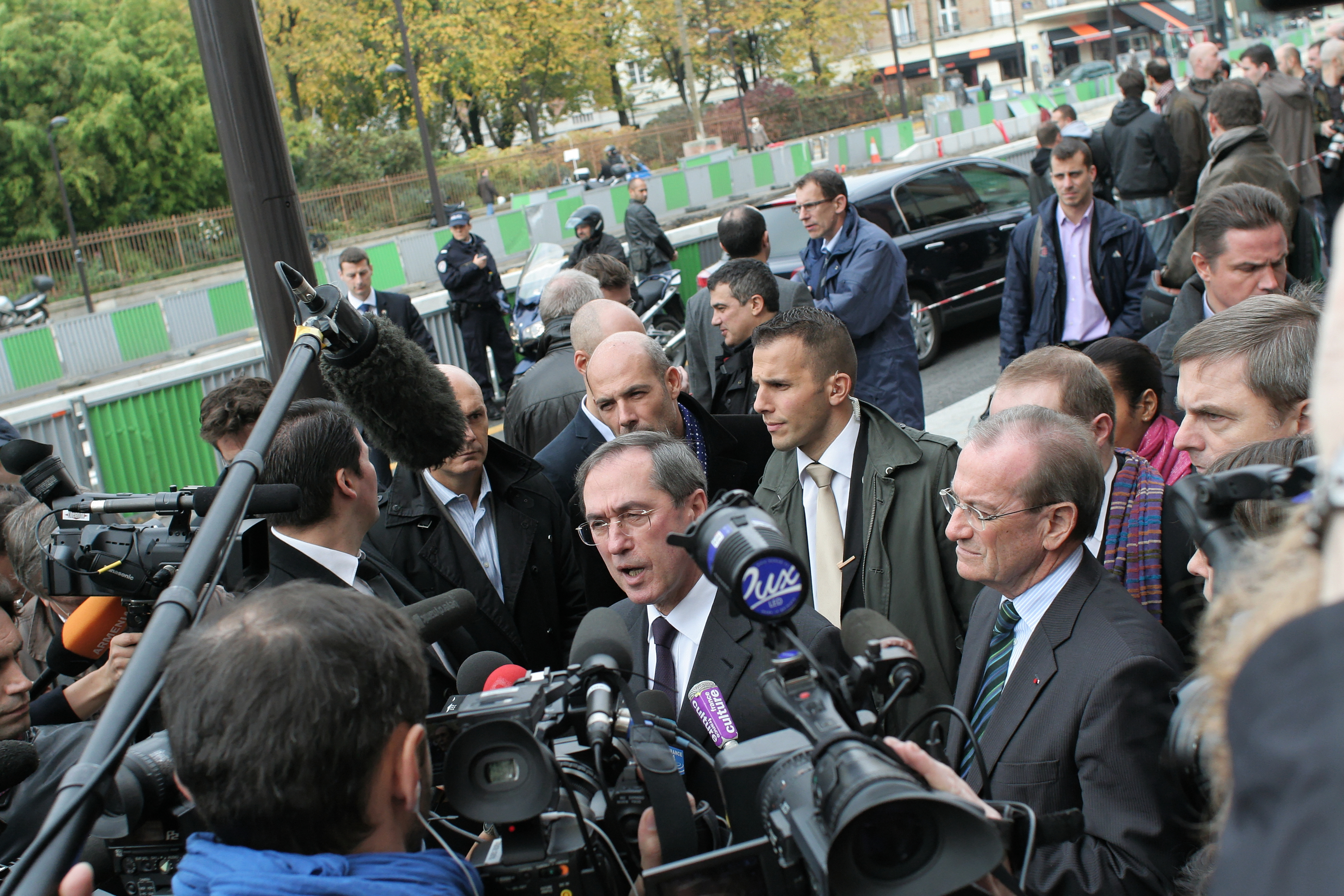
French Minister of the Interior Claude Guéant makes a public statement at the location of the arson.

== 2015 terrorist attack ==
On 7 January 2015, two Islamist terrorists stormed the Charlie Hebdo offices and shot and killed twelve people. Afterwards the terrorists reportedly declared, "We have avenged the Prophet Muhammad. We have killed Charlie Hebdo!" Among the victims were cartoonists Cabu, Charb, Honoré, Tignous, Georges Wolinski, and the economist Bernard Maris.

== See also ==
- Charlie Hebdo issue No. 1178
- Islam in France
