= La Grosse Bertha =

French satirical magazine

La Grosse Bertha (Big Bertha) was a French weekly satirical magazine created in 1991 in opposition to the Gulf War. Its editor and publisher was Jean-Cyrille Godefroy and its first editor-in-chief was François Forcadell. The title of the magazine was an anti-militarist jibe; "Big Bertha" is the name of a massive piece of heavy artillery.

The editorial team included humorists such as François Rollin, Philippe Val, Kafka, Jean-Jacques Peroni, Patrick Font, Kleude, Fredo Manon Troppo (Frédéric Pagès), Oncle Bernard (Bernard Maris), Gérard Biard, Docteur H (Hervé Le Tellier), Xavier Pasquini and also Charlie Hebdo alumni such as Arthur, Cabu, Willem (who drew the first cover), Georges Wolinski, Gébé and Siné. Among the artists were Honoré, Bernar, Lefred Thouron, Cardon, Gorce, Kerleroux, Pessin, Loup, Faujour, Jiho, Berth, Samson, Luz, Riss and Charb.

The magazine underwent an editorial split in 1992, causing much of the editorial team to leave and revive Charlie Hebdo. La Grosse Bertha ceased publication a year later.

== See also ==
- Hara-Kiri (magazine)
