= Philippe Val =

French journalist, singer, and comedian (born 1952)

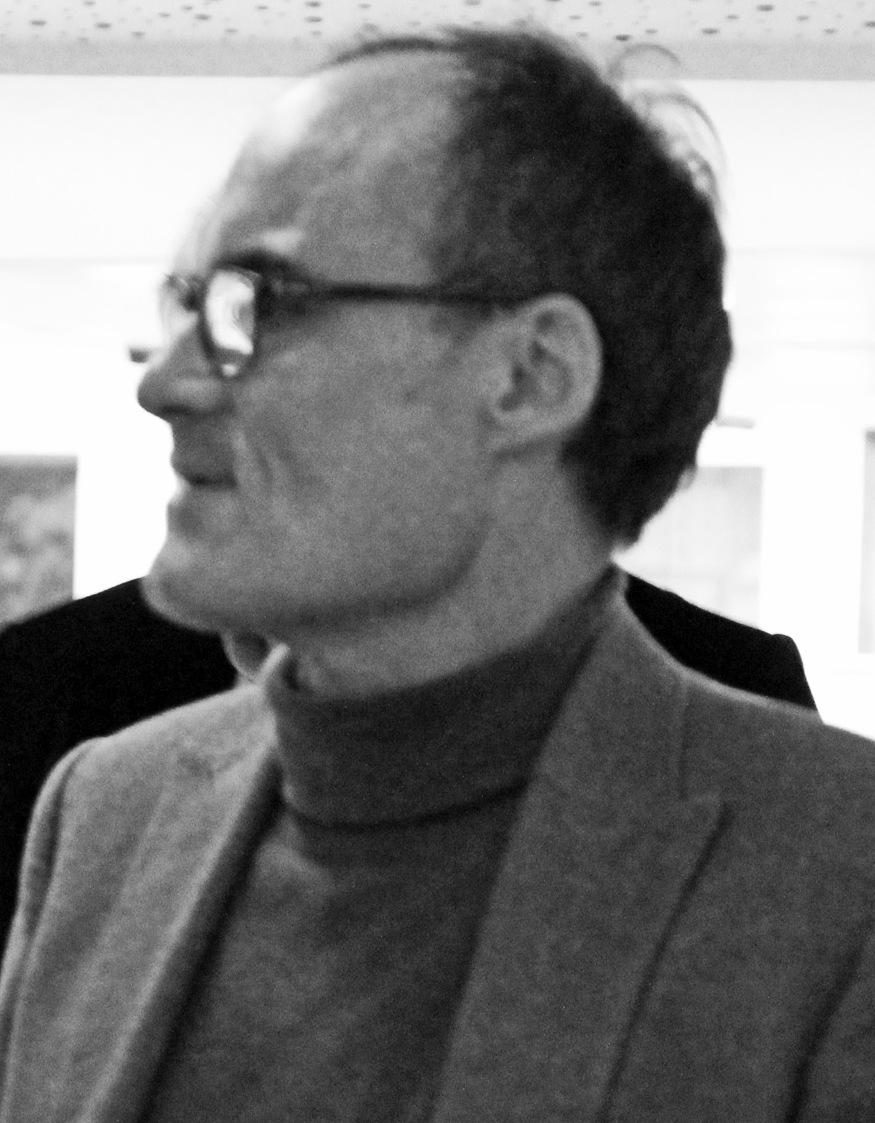
- Philippe Val (2013)
- Born: 14 September 1952 (age 73); Neuilly-sur-Seine, France
- Occupations: Journalist; comedian; singer
- Known for: Font et Val comedy duo Co-founder of Charlie Hebdo

Philippe Val (French: [filip val]; born 14 September 1952) is a French journalist, singer, and comedian. He was a co-founder of the second iteration of Charlie Hebdo in 1992, serving as the satirical political weekly's editor and director. After leaving Charlie Hebdo in 2009, Val was director of the public radio channel France Inter until 2014.

== Biography ==
Val was born in Neuilly-sur-Seine (Hautsde-Seine) to a butcher's father and a hairdressing mother, as the last of four siblings. Val first became known as a member of the comedy duo Font et Val with Patrick Font from 1970 until 1996, and sometimes as a one-person show performer, with his dog "Jeff". He is also a singer and pianist. At the turn of the 21st century, he performed with Emmanuel Binet on bass. His last album was called simply Philippe Val.

=== Charlie Hebdo career ===
Val was briefly the editor of the satirical political weekly La Grosse Bertha in 1991, and appointed Cabu, Charb, Gébé, Peroni, and Tignous to his editorial team. After he was removed from his position in 1992, he helped re-launch Charlie Hebdo together with Bernard Maris, Xavier Pasquini, Albert Algoud, Olivier Cyran, Luz, and Riss.

In 2004, following the death of Gébé, Val succeeded him as director of Charlie Hebdo, while still holding his position as editor. Several contributors and journalists, including Olivier Cyran, Mona Chollet, and Philippe Corcuff protested against Val's ideas and left the magazine. Val's editorship of Charlie Hebdo was influenced by three convictions: philo-Semitism, anti-sociologisme, and an aversion to Islam due to the assumption that anti-Semitism is intrinsic to Arab identity and Islam. As editorial director, Val chose to publish the Jyllands-Posten Muhammad cartoons in late 2005. As a result of publishing the cartoons, Charlie Hebdo was taken to court for inciting hatred; in 2007 it was acquitted of those charges. Val co-signed a petition, "le manifeste des 12", together with Bernard-Henri Lévy, Salman Rushdie, Taslima Nasrin and eight others, which denounced the dangers of Islamist ideology, calling it a "new totalitarianism".

In 2008, Val fired cartoonist Siné from the magazine for an alleged antisemitic comment in one of his columns. However, in December 2010, Siné won a 40,000-euro court judgment against Charlie Hebdo for wrongful termination. In 2009, Val resigned from Charlie Hebdo after being appointed director of France Inter.

Val has been described as a counter-jihad activist by Farid Hafez, who has stated that he "is seen as a kind of martyr for his activism in the fight against Islamisation", with Gates of Vienna listing him as a "victim of the 'repression of the counter-jihad movement'".

=== Later activities ===
Val served as the director of public radio channel France Inter until 2014.

In April 2018, Val drafted a manifesto "against the new anti-Semitism", which was signed by 250 personalities in France including Nicolas Sarkozy, Manuel Valls, Jack Lang, Julia Kristeva, and Gérard Depardieu, condemning the "silent ethnic cleansing" of Jews by Muslims in certain parts of France.

Val joined radio station Europe 1 as a weekly columnist in 2021.

== Publications ==
- Vingt ans de finesse (Font & Val) (with Patrick Font), Le Cherche midi, 1992
- Allez-y, vous n'en reviendrez pas, Le Cherche midi, 1994
- Allez-y, vous n'en reviendrez pas, la suite, Le Cherche midi, 1996
- Fin de siècle en solde, Le Cherche midi, 1999
- No Problem !, Le Cherche midi, 2000
- Bonjour l'ambiance, Le Cherche midi, 2001
- Bons baisers de Ben Laden, Le Cherche midi, 2004
- Les années Charlie : 1969-2004 (with Cavanna), Hoëbeke, 2004
- Le référendum des lâches : les arguments tabous du oui et du non à l'Europe, Le Cherche midi, 2005
- Traité de savoir survivre par temps obscurs, Éditions Grasset, 2007
- Les traîtres et les crétins : chroniques politiques, Le Cherche midi, 2007
- Reviens, Voltaire, ils sont devenus fous, Éditions Grasset, 2008
- Si ça continue, ça va pas durer, Les Échappés -France Inter, 2009
- Malaise dans l’inculture, Éditions Grasset, 2015
- C'était Charlie, Éditions Grasset, 2015
- Cachez cette identité que je ne saurais voir, Grasset, 2017
- Le nouvel antisémitisme en France, Éditions Albin Michel, 2018
- Tu finiras clochard comme ton Zola, Éditions de l’Observatoire, 2019
- L'Europe ou rien, L'Observatoire, 2020
- Allegro Barbaro, Éditions de l’Observatoire, 2020
- Dictionnaire philosophique d'un monde sans Dieu, Éditions de l’Observatoire, 2022
- Rire, Éditions de l’Observatoire, 2024
