= Zineb El Rhazoui =

French-Moroccan journalist (born 1982)

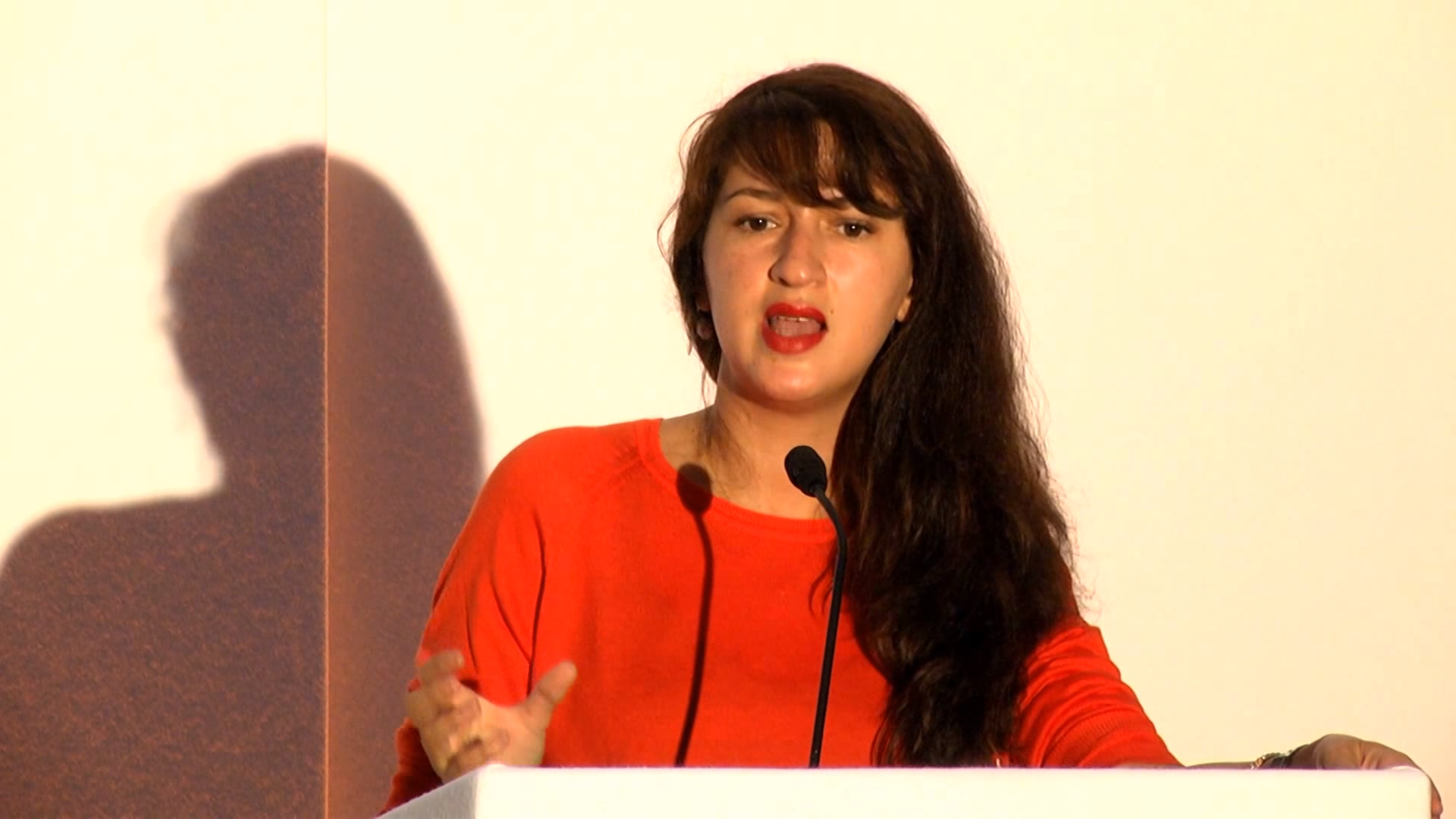
- Rhazoui in 2017
- Born: 19 January 1982 (age 44); Casablanca, Morocco
- Citizenship: Morocco, France
- Occupations: Journalist; writer
- Employer: Charlie Hebdo (2011–2017)

Zineb El Rhazoui (Arabic: زينب الغزوي; born 19 January 1982), known mononymously as Zineb, is a French-Moroccan journalist. She was a columnist for the Paris-based satirical magazine Charlie Hebdo from 2011 to 2017, but was in Morocco during the Charlie Hebdo shooting on 7 January 2015.

She was the magazine's religion expert and an outspoken critic of Islam. Since the killings, she has become a prominent secularist and campaigner for universal human rights, speaking publicly around the world about Islam and free speech. She left Charlie Hebdo on 3 January 2017, citing the magazine's adoption of an "editorial line demanded by Islamists" as one of the reasons for her departure.

In 2019, she received the Simone Veil Prize for her fight against global Islamism. However, in December 2023, she was stripped of the title after she reposted a statement on Twitter mounting a Palestinian genocide accusation against Israel in light of the Gaza war and also likening Zionism to Nazism.

== Early life ==
Rhazoui was born on 19 January 1982 in Casablanca, Morocco.

Growing up in Morocco, she routinely asked critical questions about the subordinate status of women under Islam. In secondary school, she made a point of wearing black nail polish and low-cut blouses to school, where her teacher was a conservative man with a long beard. "As a woman in a male-dominated country, you sooner or later face a choice. You can comply, let yourself be cowed, and shut up, or you have to fight."

== Career ==
Speech at the International Conference on Free Expression and Conscience, London, 22–24 July 2017

After graduating, Rhazoui worked for a semester as a teaching assistant at Cairo University. At the library she read early Islamic writings, which she found to be more thoughtful and open to critical analysis than modern Islam. She wrote a master's degree on Muslims in Morocco who convert to Christianity. She later said that she "wanted to understand how they first could put out the enormous intellectual effort that it takes to escape from one form of brainwashing, only to voluntarily join another religion."

Rhazoui began her career as a journalist in Morocco working for a weekly paper that was shut down by the regime in 2010. She published a number of articles about religious minorities in the journal Le Journal Hebdomadaire, which was banned by the Moroccan government in 2010. She is the founder of several organizations, including the pro-democracy, pro-secularism movement MALI, which she co-founded with Ibtissam Lachgar in August 2009. She was arrested three times by the Moroccan government for criticizing it. One of the crimes for which she was arrested was at a protest picnic in 2009, which then involved her eating lunch in a public park in defiance of the Islamic holy month of Ramadan. She was eventually forced into exile in Slovenia.

She later went to Paris to study, and became a spokeswoman for the feminist organization Ni Putes Ni Soumises ("Neither Whores Nor Submitted [Women]"), for which she worked helping Muslim women in oppressive family relationships. At the Sorbonne she studied Arabic, English, and French.

=== Charlie Hebdo ===
In 2011, during the Arab Spring, Charlie Hebdo asked to interview her about her participation in the struggles in Morocco. At a lunch, editors Stéphane "Charb" Charbonnier and Laurent "Riss" Sourisseau invited her to join an editorial meeting on the coming Wednesday. She was then offered and accepted a job with the magazine. In order for the magazine to be able to afford to employ her, cartoonist Rénald "Luz" Luzier offered to take a pay cut.

She wrote the text for the 2013 special issue of Charlie Hebdo, a comic-strip retelling of the life of Muhammed, which intensified the harassments and death threats directed at the magazine. The illustrations were created by Charlie Hebdo editor Stéphane Charbonnier. She contributed to Charlie Hebdo issue No. 1178. She was described by the International Business Times as "a secularist and human rights campaigner". In February 2015, she received death threats from ISIS.

==== Charlie Hebdo shooting (2015) ====
On 7 January 2015, Rhazoui was at her home in Casablanca, Morocco, having had her Christmas holiday extended. She sent an article about ISIS's views of women to her editor at Charlie Hebdo and then went back to bed. Two hours later she was awoken by her ringing phone. It was a friend telling her about the massacre at the magazine's offices. During the next few hours, she would learn that twelve of her friends and colleagues had been murdered. She later told Aftenposten that she believed herself to have been one of the terrorists' main targets. She said: "Those of us who are alive are alive only because of small coincidences."

In a 9 January article for Le Monde, she recalled her massacred colleagues and praised Charlie Hebdo as an "edgy newspaper" but one that "never takes itself seriously." She stated that "Charlie has never been a newspaper like any other" and that her colleagues had been murdered "because we dared to deride Islam." A meeting room once "accustomed to jokes and laughter" had become the site of a "bloodbath." Charb, she remembered, was always worried about the newspaper dying but "cared little about his own death, he who had been under police protection since 2012." Addressing him, she said: "If you had been here, my Charb, if only you could have seen the place de la République, packed with people, people in tears wearing your portrait in a monastic silence."

She contributed to Charlie Hebdo issue No. 1178, which was published the week after the killings.

=== Post-shooting ===
Rhazoui speaking at De Balie in Amsterdam in 2018

After the massacre, extensive security routines became a part of Rhazoui's life. She avoids eating at restaurants or taking the train.

Those who defend the violence [against Charlie Hebdo] or who think we've all but asked for it ourselves," she has said, "I place...in the same category as the Islamists. Many of those on the left, in several countries, are so scared of being accused of racism or Islamophobia that they accept oppression and abuse of women and children, 'among the others.' They don't dare get involved. I think that's exactly what racism is – approving differential treatment.

In January 2015 she toured Quebec for a fund-raiser for Charlie Hebdo, and also spoke about Islam and freedom. "Secularism as far as I know, is the only way to permit everyone to live in the same society, even if people are different," she stated, adding that Islam "needs to submit to secularism and it also needs to get a sense of humour."

In February 2015, she received death threats via Twitter that she described as "a fatwa 2.0." Several people online have written that it is their "obligation" to find her and kill her in order to avenge the prophet. Her husband has also been targeted with backlash as a result. In that month, thousands of supporters of the ISIS jihadist group called for lone-wolf terrorists to target el-Rhazoui. They tweeted under a hashtag translated as #MustKillZinebElRhazouiInRetaliationForTheProphet and posted her personal details, pictures of her husband and sister, and a map showing places she had visited, along with photographs of ISIS beheadings. In addition, reward money has been offered for information on her or her husband's residence or workplace.

In March 2015, she gave a talk about the freedom of expression at the University of Chicago Law School in Chicago. Her visit to Chicago, sponsored by the university's French Club, marked the first time a Charlie Hebdo journalist had spoken in the United States since the attack.

She was profiled on April 2, 2015, in a long article in the Norwegian newspaper Aftenposten.

In April 2015, she moved from Casablanca to Paris.

=== Resignation from Charlie Hebdo ===
On September 10, 2016, Rhazoui announced her intention to quit Charlie Hebdo during an interview on Web7Radio. According to her, the magazine is "under full police surveillance" and not the same as it used to be prior to the massacre. She formalized her departure on January 3, and criticized the magazine three days later, on the eve of the massacre's second anniversary, for following the "editorial line demanded by Islamists" and for no longer being motivated to draw Muhammad.

She became the subject of a documentary titled Rien n'est pardonné ("Nothing is Forgiven"), directed by Vincent Coen and Guillaume Vandenberghe and co-produced by Belgium's Francophone RTBF network. It chronicles her life from 2011, during the Arab Spring in Morocco, to 2016. The film appeared at the 2017 Festival International de Programmes Audiovisuels in Biarritz, and at the 2018 One World Film Festival in Prague.

In November 2019, she was awarded the Simone Veil Prize by the Conseil régional d'Île-de-France for her defense of secularism in France and fight against Islamism. This award was revoked by Valérie Pécresse in December 2023 after the grandson of Simone Veil accused Rhazoui of abusing and relativizing the memory of the Holocaust, this was in response to Rhazoui retweeting a post accusing Israel of Palestinian genocide during the Gaza war, and which compared Zionism to Nazism and the Holocaust.

== Views ==
Rhazoui receiving an award from the Council of Ex-Muslims of Britain

In her controversial book Destroy Islamic Fascism (2016), she states that "those that think that Islam has nothing to do with terrorism are ignorant".

In November 2019, on a televised broadcast on CNews, she triggered a polemic, by saying during a debate on urban violence: "The police must shoot real bullets in these cases." After the debate she explained on Twitter that the law allows police officers to shoot people when threatened with death or serious injury, and that she hasn't called for shooting at protesters who don't pose a threat.

One of the texts in which she has most thoroughly set forth her views on Islam, the concept of anti-Muslim racism, Western attitudes toward Islam, and related issues was a response to a harsh December 2013 critique by Olivier Cyran of her work for Charlie Hebdo.

To her, in Cyran's view "people of my race, and myself, are congenitally sealed off from the ubiquitous ideas of atheism and anticlericalism," or, perhaps, that "unlike other peoples, our identity is solely structured by religion." Noting that Moroccan laws "do not grant me a quarter of the rights you acquired at birth," and that if she were raped "the websites that posted your article will definitely say I was asking for it because I don’t respect Islam," she observed that Cyran himself had implicitly endorsed all of this by embracing the "whole moralizing discourse about how one must 'respect Islam,' as demanded by the Islamists, who do not ask whether Islam respects other religions, or other people. Why the hell should I respect Islam? Does it respect me? The day Islam shows the slightest bit of consideration to women, first of all, and secondly toward free-thinkers, I promise you I will rethink my positions."

The author has been very critical of Israel. She had her Simone Veil Prize revoked after she shared a thread -originally posted by journalist Benjamin Rubinstein- on the X social media platform comparing the unfolding Israeli war on Gaza to Nazi Germany's holocaust.

== See also ==
- Maghrebian community of Paris
