= Corinne Rey =

Corinne Rey may refer to:

- Corinne Rey (cartoonist), French cartoonist at Charlie Hebdo known as Coco
- Corinne Rey-Bellet (1972–2006), Swiss alpine skier
