= Luzier =

Luzier is a surname. Notable people with the surname include:

- Ray Luzier (born 1970), American drummer
- Rénald Luzier alias Luz (born 1972), French satirical cartoonist
