= Simon Fieschi =

French webmaster and writer (1983–2024)

- Born: 3 November 1983
- Died: 17 October 2024 (aged 40); Paris, France
- Education: Paris-Sorbonne University
- Occupations: Webmaster; Writer

Simon Fieschi (3 November 1983 – 17 October 2024) was a French webmaster and writer. He was wounded in the 2015 shooting at the Charlie Hebdo headquarters in Paris and left with severe injuries.

== Biography ==
Born on 3 November 1983, Fieschi earned a master's degree in human sciences from Paris-Sorbonne University. He wrote his thesis on the fight between the National Gendarmerie and Corsican militants from 1927 to 1934. In 2012, he became the webmaster for Charlie Hebdo. In 2013, he met his partner, Maisie, who was from Australia.

On 7 January 2015, he was the first staff member injured in the shooting. A bullet from a Kalashnikov rifle perforated his lung and damaged his spinal cord. He was evacuated to hospital and spent a week in an induced coma. Having lost the use of his legs and hands, he remained in hospital for eight months, learning eventually to walk with the aid of crutches but never regaining full use of his fingers.

After the attack, Fieschi married his partner, Maisie, and the couple had a daughter. He campaigned for compensation for victims of terrorism and visited schools to talk about terrorism. In 2020, he testified at the Charlie Hebdo trial. He described how his physical injuries stabilised to leave a long-term psychological trauma. In September 2024, he testified at the trial of Peter Cherif.

Fieschi died in his hotel room in Paris, on 17 October 2024, at the age of 40. An investigation was opened to determine the cause of death. He notably received tributes from President of France Emmanuel Macron, former president François Hollande, the cartoonist Coco, and the writer Yannick Haenel.

== Publications ==
- "« Le dernier cri de la carte postale ! » La collection de cartes postales en aluminium de Françoise Valette" (2010)
- Les gendarmes en Corse, 1927-1934 : de la création d'une compagnie autonome aux derniers bandits d'honneur (2012)
