= AnonCoders =

Hacker group

AnonCoders is a group of computer hackers. Using denial of service attacks, database hijacking, database leaks, admin panel takeovers, and other defacements, the group mainly targets Israeli websites in protest of crimes allegedly committed against the Palestinian people on behalf of Israel. AnonCoders began operation in January 2015.

AnonCoders' first attack was leveled against several major Israeli websites. In February, it attacked numerous French websites in opposition to cartoons of the Islamic prophet Muhammad published in Charlie Hebdo Magazine. The group has vandalized sites in Israel, Europe, and the United States.
