= Babouse =

French comics artist

François Henry Monier also known as Babouse (born 8 May 1972) in Boulogne-sur-Mer is a cartoonist, journalist, Illustrator and author of comics.

== Characteristics of the work ==
He claims to have a certain style of humorous drawing and a sense of the absurd ("L'Humanité", La Vie ouvrière","Psikopat (fr)","France 3 Nord","The Irina","ROXANNE"...), this is felt also in scenarios of his comics ("Spirou","Psikopat"...) or in his writings ("Fluide Glacial")"in the"Babouse blues"). Some of his lighter and more delusional publishings are: ("Play in the House", "Hara-Kiri" - version André Bercoff, "Presto", "Margarine comics", "Lucid Comas", "Hercules and the Golden Fleece"...).

The beady eyes of his characters and their rounded noses is similar to other work done by Chakrapani and Ralf König.

However, at the same time he continued more graphic and tortured work in "humanity" and "new life working" by signing his own name or for illustration of black novels.

== Biography ==
In 1982, he went on evening courses in the fine arts in Boulogne-sur-mer. He began his studies at the regional University of the Beaux-Arts de Dunkerque and in 1990, he devoted himself fully to comics and drawing of news.

== The 40 commandments series ==
- "The 40 commandments of gardening", Éditions Wygo, 2010
- "The 40 commandments of the Comité d'Entreprise", Éditions Wygo, 2010
- "The 40 commandments of camping", Éditions Wygo, 2010
- "40 commandments of gay", Éditions Wygo, 2010
- "The 40 commandments of the teacher", Éditions Wygo, 2009
- "The 40 commandments of the handyman", Éditions Wygo, 2009
- "40 commandments of women", Éditions Wygo, 2008
- "The 40 commandments of the Ch'ti ', Éditions Wygo, 2008
- "The 40 commandments of man", Éditions Wygo, 2008

== Comic ==
- "Te see me do oeul?", Éditions City Hall of Calais, 2002
- "France made in Sarko", Éditions Wygo, 2009

== Illustrations ==
- "The zamal Primer" Nicolas Millet, Éditions Z, 2011.
- "The Almanac of the big heads" of Philippe Bouvard, Editions Michel Lafon, 2012.
- "Guillaume Meurice chronic society" Guillaume Meurice and Babouse, Editions 2011 30-editions.
- "The list of holidays of the big heads" of Philippe Bouvard, Editions Michel Lafon, 2012.
- "The Almanac of the big heads" of Philippe Bouvard, Editions Michel Lafon, 2013.

== See also ==
=== Related articles ===
- Ricardo Montserrat
- Frédéric H. Fajardie
- Dick Annegarn

=== Editors ===
- L'Humanité
- Psikopat
- France-Soir
- Charlie Hebdo
- Wygo
