= Mohammed Moussaoui =

President of the French Council of Muslim Faith

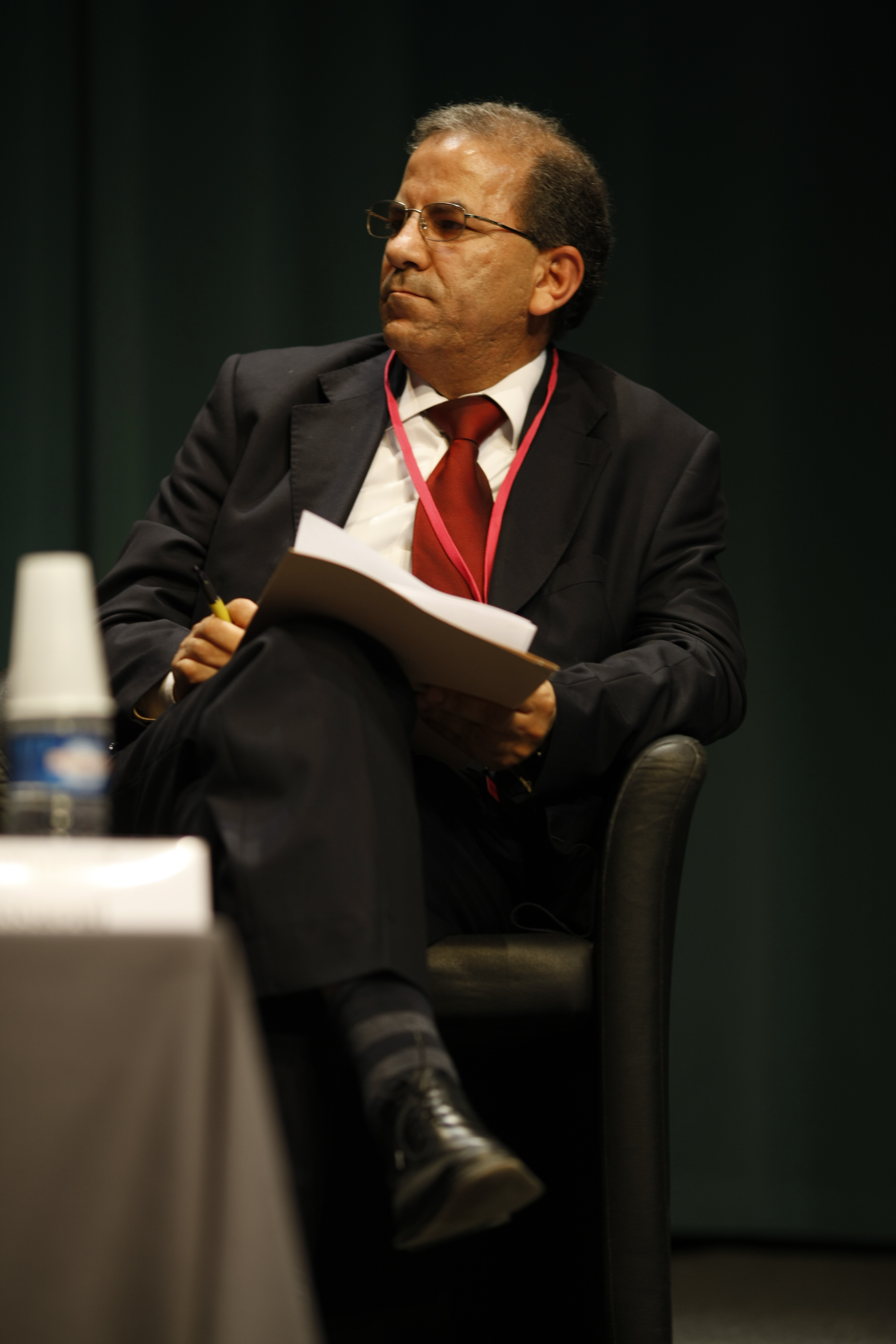
- Born: April 1, 1964 (age 61); Figuig
- Occupations: University teacher; Mathematician; Christian minister

Mohammed Moussaoui (born 1 April 1964 in Figuig, Morocco) is the president of the French Council of Muslim Faith.

As of 2008, he is naturalizing as a citizen of France. On August 2, 2011, he gave an interview with French radio station RTL, where he stated that there are nearly 150 new mosques under construction in France, and that there are more practicing Muslims than Roman Catholics in the country. France, home to an estimated six million Muslims, has the largest Muslim population in the European Union.

On November 3, 2011 he condemned the previous day's firebombing of French magazine Charlie Hebdo, saying that it was "an act which can in no way represent the principles of liberty, tolerance and peace that are (our) message", but he went on to regret the "anxious European climate of Islamophobia." He condemned the "hateful act" (of gunmen attacking French satirical magazine in Paris and killing 12 people), and urged Muslims and Christians "to intensify their actions to give more strength to this dialogue, to make a united front against extremism." He also criticized the cartoons, saying that "If freedom of expression gives the right to be satirical or humorous, we can understand that cartoons putting a prophet who is fundamental to millions of believers in suggestive and degrading postures cannot fall within this right."

After the murder of Samuel Paty in October 2020, Mohammed Moussaoui declared that "French Muslims are shocked and hurt"; "To those who think that our religion can be used for the purposes of terror and barbarism, their actions are an insult to the memory of the Prophet, a travesty of his message."
