= Gérard Biard =

French journalist (born 1959)

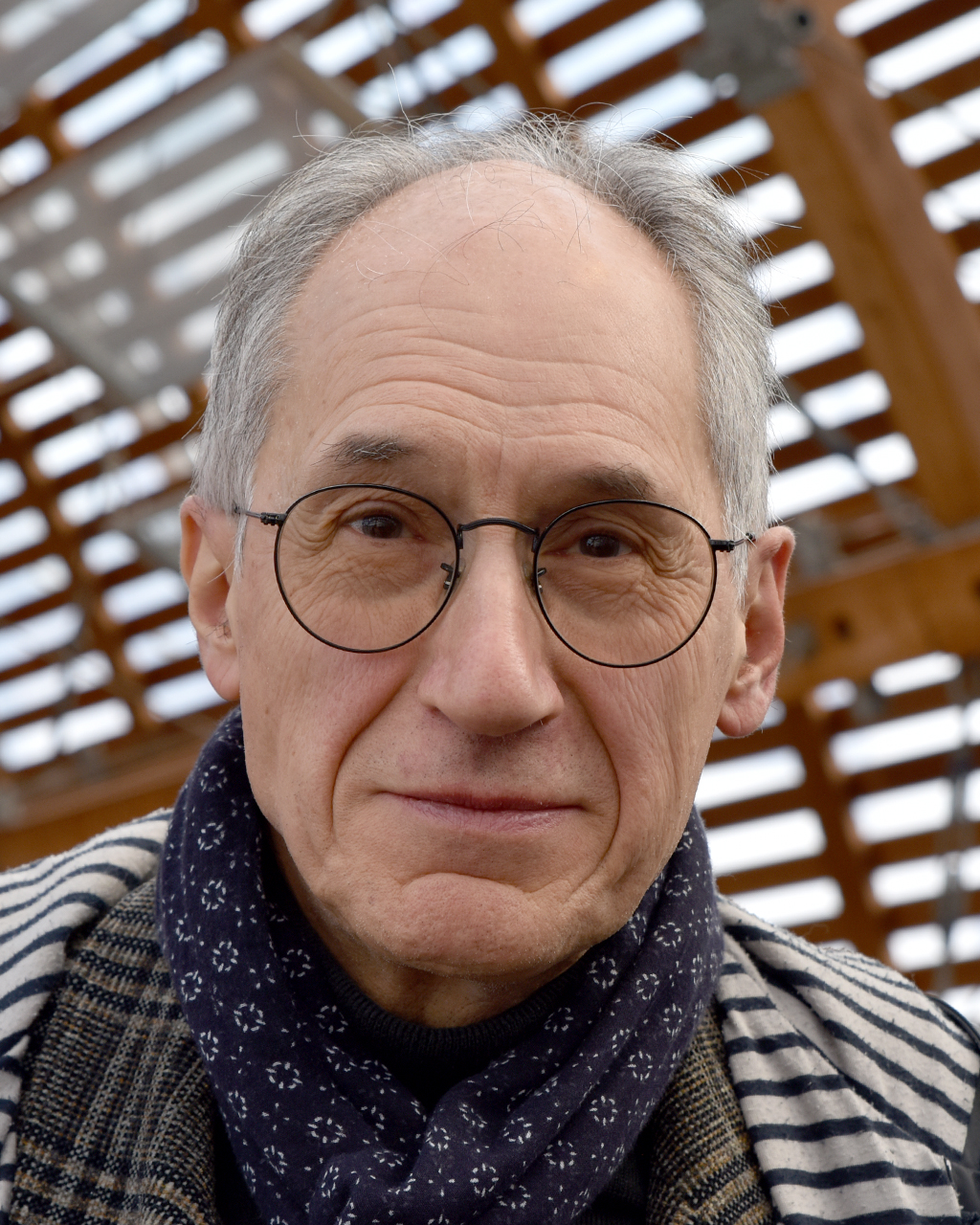
- Gérard Biard (2025)
- Born: 4 January 1959 (age 67); Paris, France
- Occupations: Journalist, editor
- Known for: Editor in chief of Charlie Hebdo

Gérard Biard (born 4 August 1959) is a French journalist. He is the editor‑in‑chief of the satirical French news magazine, Charlie Hebdo.

He has been associated with Charlie Hebdo since 1992, when it was relaunched after a 10-year hiatus. He was in London for a conference when Charlie Hebdo's Paris office was targeted in a January 2015 terrorist attack.

In May 2015, Biard and film critic Jean-Baptiste Thoret accepted the PEN/Toni and James C. Goodale Freedom of Expression Courage Award on behalf of Charlie Hebdo.

Biard is strongly in favour of secularism. In October 2014 he participated in a conference of the French feminist organization Regards de femmes on the topic. He is a founder and spokesperson for Zéromacho, an organization of men "against prostitution and for equality".
