= Charlie Hebdo =

French satirical weekly news magazine

- Type: Satirical weekly news magazine
- Format: Berliner
- Owners: Laurent Sourisseau (70%); Éric Portheault (30%)
- Founders: François Cavanna; Professeur Choron
- Editor-in-chief: Gérard Biard
- Founded: 1970; 56 years ago
- Ceased publication: 1981; 45 years ago
- Relaunched: 1992; 34 years ago
- Political alignment: Left-libertarian
- Language: French
- Headquarters: Paris, France
- Circulation: ~55,000 (as of September 2020)
- ISSN: 1240-0068 (print); 2270-7905 (web)
- OCLC number: 421653858
- Website: charliehebdo.fr/en/

Charlie Hebdo (French: [ʃaʁli ɛbdo]; French for 'Charlie Weekly') is a French satirical weekly news magazine founded by François Cavanna and Professeur Choron in 1970, featuring cartoons, reports, polemics, and jokes. The publication has been described as anti-racist, sceptical, secular, libertarian, and within the tradition of left-wing radicalism, publishing articles criticizing right-wing conservative or far-right movements (especially the French nationalist National Rally party), religion (Christianity, Islam, and Judaism), politics and culture.

Charlie Hebdo has been the target of three terrorist attacks: in 2011, 2015, and 2020. All of them were presumed to be in response to a number of cartoons that it published controversially depicting Muhammad. In the second of these attacks, 12 people were killed, including publishing director Charb and several other prominent cartoonists. In the aftermath, Charlie Hebdo and its publications became internationally recognized as symbols of free speech, culminating in the "Je Suis Charlie" ("I am Charlie") movement, which underscored the global defense of freedom of expression and opposition to censorship.

Since its founding, Charlie Hebdo has been a vocal advocate for free expression and secularism, using satire to critique organized religion, political movements, and other centers of power. Charlie Hebdo first appeared in 1970 after the monthly Hara-Kiri magazine was banned for mocking the death of a former French president, Charles de Gaulle. In 1981, publication ceased, but the magazine was resurrected in 1992. The magazine is published every Wednesday, with special editions issued on an unscheduled basis sporadically. Gérard Biard is the current editor-in-chief of Charlie Hebdo. The previous editors were François Cavanna (1970–1981) and Philippe Val (1992–2009).

== History ==
=== Origins in Hara-Kiri ===
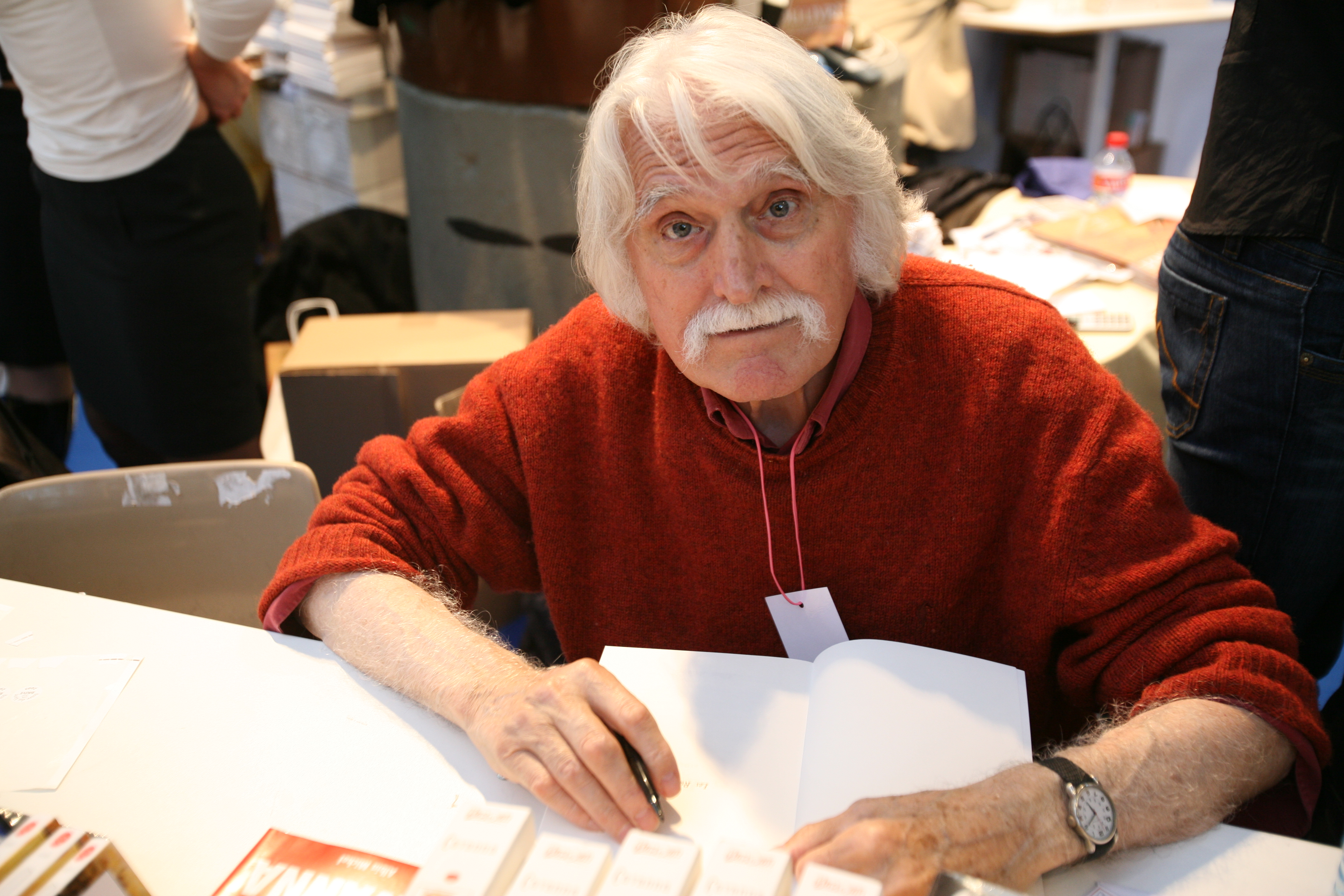
François Cavanna (1923–2014), one of the founders of the first Charlie Hebdo title

In 1960, Georges "Professeur Choron" Bernier and François Cavanna launched a monthly magazine entitled Hara-Kiri. Choron acted as the director of publication and Cavanna as its editor. Eventually Cavanna gathered together a team which included Roland Topor, Fred, Jean-Marc Reiser, Georges Wolinski, Gébé, and Cabu. After an early reader's letter accused them of being "dumb and nasty" ("bête et méchant"), the phrase became an official slogan for the magazine and made it into everyday language in France.

Hara-Kiri was briefly banned in 1961, and again for six months in 1966. A few contributors did not return along with the newspaper, such as Gébé, Cabu, Topor, and Fred. New members of the team included Delfeil de Ton, Pierre Fournier, and Willem. In 1969, the Hara-Kiri team decided to produce a weekly publication – on top of the existing monthly magazine – which would focus more on current affairs. This was launched in February as Hara-Kiri Hebdo and renamed L'Hebdo Hara-Kiri in May of the same year. (Hebdo is short for hebdomadaire – "weekly")

=== Launch of Charlie Hebdo ===
In November 1970, the former French president Charles de Gaulle died in his home village of Colombey-les-Deux-Églises, eight days after a disaster in a nightclub, the Club Cinq-Sept fire, which had caused the death of 146 people. The magazine released a cover spoofing the popular press's coverage of this disaster, headlined "Tragic Ball at Colombey, one dead". As a result, the weekly was banned.

In order to sidestep the ban, the editorial team decided to change its title, and used Charlie Hebdo. The new name was derived from a monthly comics magazine called Charlie (later renamed Charlie Mensuel, meaning Charlie Monthly), which had been started by Bernier and Delfeil de Ton in 1969. The monthly Charlie took its name from the lead character of one of the comics it originally published, Peanuts's Charlie Brown. Using that title for the new weekly magazine was also an inside joke about Charles de Gaulle. The first issue featured a Peanuts strip, as the editors were fans of the series. In December 1981, the publication ceased.

=== Rebirth ===
In 1991, Gébé, Cabu, and others were reunited to work for La Grosse Bertha, a new weekly magazine resembling Charlie Hebdo, created in reaction to the First Gulf War and edited by singer and comedian Philippe Val. However, the following year, Val clashed with the publisher, who wanted apolitical humour, and was fired. Gébé and Cabu walked out with him and decided to launch their own paper again. The three called upon Cavanna, Delfeil de Ton, and Wolinski, requesting their help and input. After much searching for a new name, the obvious idea of resurrecting Charlie Hebdo was agreed on. The new magazine was owned by Val, Gébé, Cabu, and singer Renaud. Val was editor; Gébé was publication director.

The publication of the new Charlie Hebdo began in July 1992 amidst much publicity. The first issue under the new publication sold 100,000 copies. Choron, who had fallen out with his former colleagues, tried to restart a weekly Hara-Kiri but its publication was short-lived, and Choron died in January 2005. On 26 April 1996, François Cavanna, Charb and Philippe Val filed 173,704 signatures, obtained in eight months, with the aim of banning the political party Front National, since it would have contravened the articles 1, 2, 4, 6, and 7 of the Declaration of the Rights of Man and of the Citizen.

In 2000, journalist Mona Chollet was sacked after she had protested against a Philippe Val article which called Palestinians "non-civilised". In 2004, following the death of Gébé, Val succeeded him as director of publication, while still holding his position as editor. In 2008, controversy broke over a column by veteran cartoonist Siné which led to accusations of antisemitism and Siné's sacking by Val. Siné successfully sued the newspaper for unfair dismissal and Charlie Hebdo was ordered to pay him €90,000 in damages. Siné launched a rival paper called Siné Hebdo which later became Siné Mensuel. In 2009, Philippe Val resigned after being appointed director of France Inter, a public radio station to which he has contributed since the early 1990s. His functions were split between two cartoonists, Charb and Riss. Val gave away his shares in 2011.

== Controversy ==
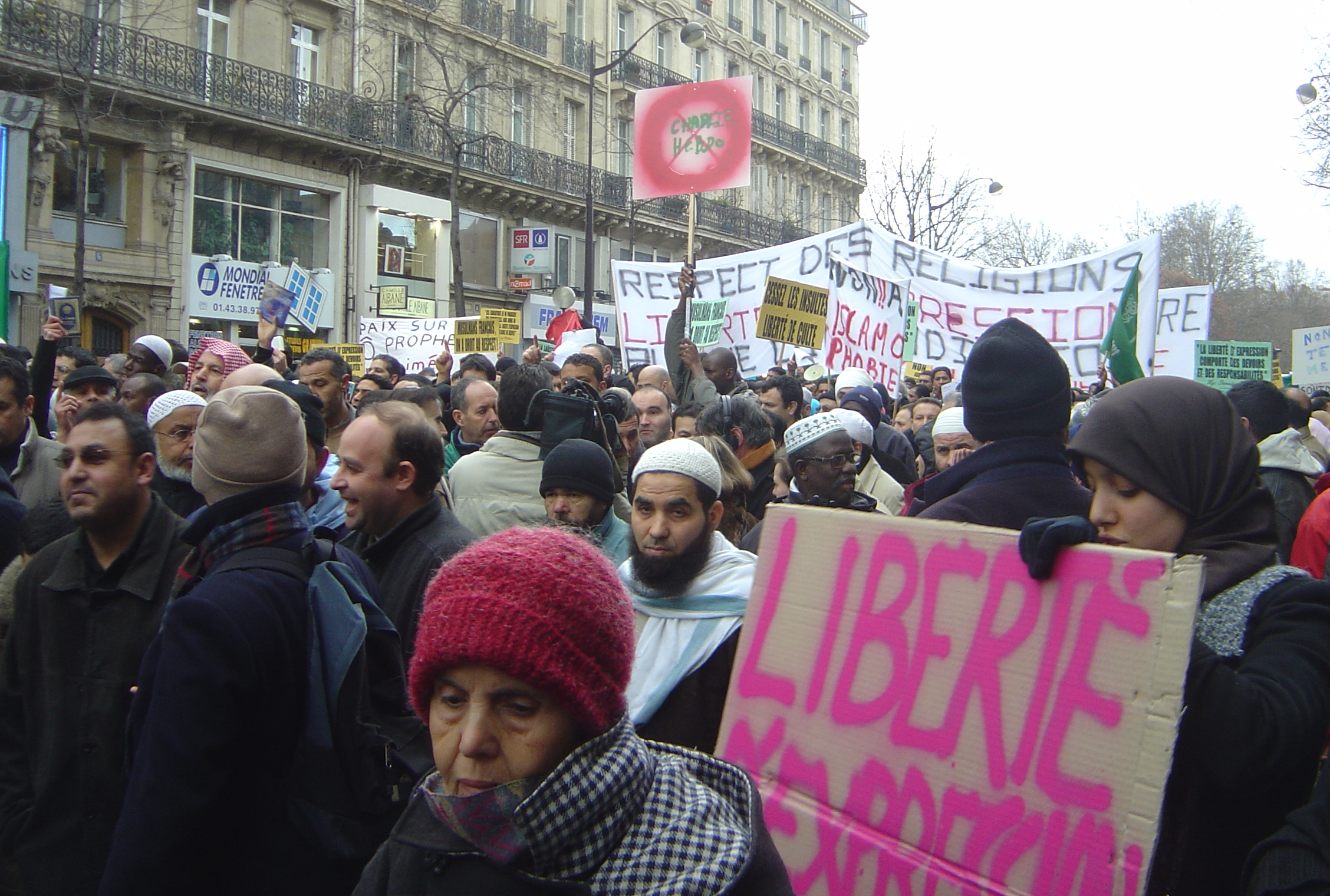
Muslims march in Paris on 11 February 2006 against the publication of caricatures of Muhammad. A sign with "Charlie Hebdo" circled and crossed out is held aloft in the picture's upper middle.

Image of 3 November 2011 cover of Charlie Hebdo, renamed Charia Hebdo ("Sharia Hebdo"). The word balloon shows a depiction of Muhammad saying, "100 lashes if you don't die laughing!"

=== 2006 publication ===
Controversy arose over the publication's edition of 9 February 2006. Under the title "Mahomet débordé par les intégristes" ("Muhammad overwhelmed by fundamentalists"), the front page showed a cartoon of a weeping Muhammad saying "C'est dur d'être aimé par des cons" ("it's hard being loved by idiots"). The newspaper reprinted the twelve cartoons of the Jyllands-Posten Muhammad cartoons controversy and added some of their own. Compared to a regular circulation of 100,000 sold copies, this edition enjoyed great commercial success. 160,000 copies were sold and another 150,000 were in print later that day.

In response, French President Jacques Chirac condemned "overt provocations" which could inflame passions. "Anything that can hurt the convictions of someone else, in particular religious convictions, should be avoided," Chirac said. The Grand Mosque of Paris, the Muslim World League and the Union of French Islamic Organisations (UOIF) sued, claiming the cartoon edition included racist cartoons. A later edition contained a statement by a group of twelve writers warning against Islamism.

The suit by the Grand Mosque and the UOIF reached the courts in February 2007. Publisher Philippe Val contended "[i]t is racist to imagine that they can't understand a joke", while Francis Szpiner, the lawyer for the Grand Mosque, explained the suit: "Two of those caricatures make a link between Muslims and Muslim terrorists. That has a name and it's called racism."

Future president Nicolas Sarkozy sent a letter to be read in court expressing his support for the ancient French tradition of satire. François Bayrou and future president François Hollande also expressed their support for freedom of expression. The French Council of the Muslim Faith (CFCM) criticised the expression of these sentiments, claiming that they were politicising a court case.

On 22 March 2007, executive editor Val was acquitted by the court. The court followed the state attorney's reasoning that two of the three cartoons were not an attack on Islam, but on Muslim terrorists, and that the third cartoon with Muhammad with a bomb in his turban should be seen in the context of the magazine in question, which attacked religious fundamentalism.

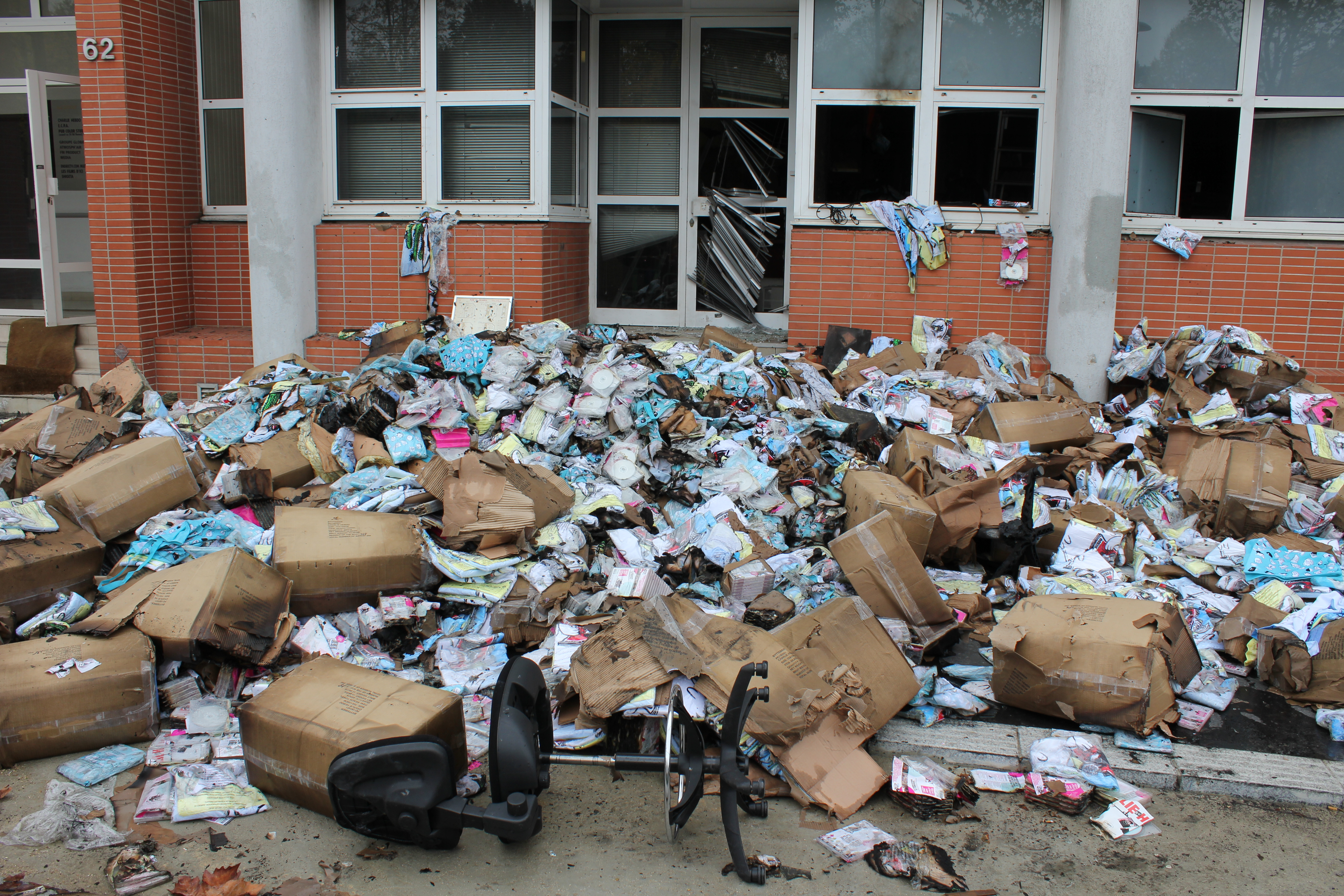
Debris outside the paper's offices following the November 2011 attack

=== 2011 firebombing ===
In November 2011, the newspaper's office in the 20th arrondissement was fire-bombed and its website hacked. The attacks were presumed to be linked to its decision to rename the edition of 3 November 2011 "Charia Hebdo", with Muhammad listed as the "editor-in-chief". The cover, featuring a cartoon of Muhammad saying: "100 lashes of the whip if you don't die laughing" by Luz (Rénald Luzier), had circulated on social media for a couple of days.

The "Charia Hebdo" issue had been a response to recent news of the post-election introduction of sharia law in Libya and the victory of the Islamist party in Tunisia. It especially focuses on oppression of women under sharia, taking aim at domestic violence, mandatory veiling, burqas, restrictions on freedom, forced marriage, and stoning of those accused of adultery. It also targeted oppression of gays and dissenters, and practices such as flogging, hand/foot/tongue amputations, polygamy, and early indoctrination of children. "Guest editor" Muhammad is portrayed as a good-humoured voice of reason, decrying the recent elections and calling for a separation between politics and religion, while stating that Islam is compatible with humour. The magazine responded to the bombing by distributing some four times the usual number of copies.

Charb was quoted by Associated Press stating that the attack might have been carried out by "stupid people who don't know what Islam is" and that they are "idiots who betray their own religion". Mohammed Moussaoui, head of the French Council of the Muslim Faith, said his organisation deplores "the very mocking tone of the paper toward Islam and its prophet but reaffirms with force its total opposition to all acts and all forms of violence." François Fillon and Claude Guéant, respectively the then French prime minister and interior minister, voiced support for Charlie Hebdo, as did feminist writer Ayaan Hirsi Ali, who criticised calls for self-censorship.

=== 2012 cartoons depicting Muhammad ===
In September 2012, the newspaper published a series of satirical cartoons of Muhammad. One cartoon depicted Muhammad as a nude man on all fours with a star covering his anus. Another shows Muhammad bending over naked and begging to be admired. Given that this issue came days after a series of attacks on US embassies in the Middle East, purportedly in response to the anti-Islamic film Innocence of Muslims, the French government decided to increase security at certain French embassies, as well as to close the French embassies, consulates, cultural centres, and international schools in about 20 Muslim countries. In addition, riot police surrounded the offices of the magazine to protect it against possible attacks.

Foreign Minister Laurent Fabius criticised the magazine's decision, saying, "In France, there is a principle of freedom of expression, which should not be undermined. In the present context, given this absurd video that has been aired, strong emotions have been awakened in many Muslim countries. Is it really sensible or intelligent to pour oil on the fire?" The US White House said "a French magazine published cartoons featuring a figure resembling the Prophet Muhammad, and obviously, we have questions about the judgment of publishing something like this." When speaking before the United Nations later in the month, President Obama remarked more broadly that "The future must not belong to those who slander the prophet of Islam. But to be credible, those who condemn that slander must also condemn the hate we see in the images of Jesus Christ that are desecrated, or churches that are destroyed, or the Holocaust that is denied." The newspaper's editor defended publication of the cartoons, saying, "We do caricatures of everyone, and above all every week, and when we do it with the Prophet, it's called provocation."

=== 2015 attack ===
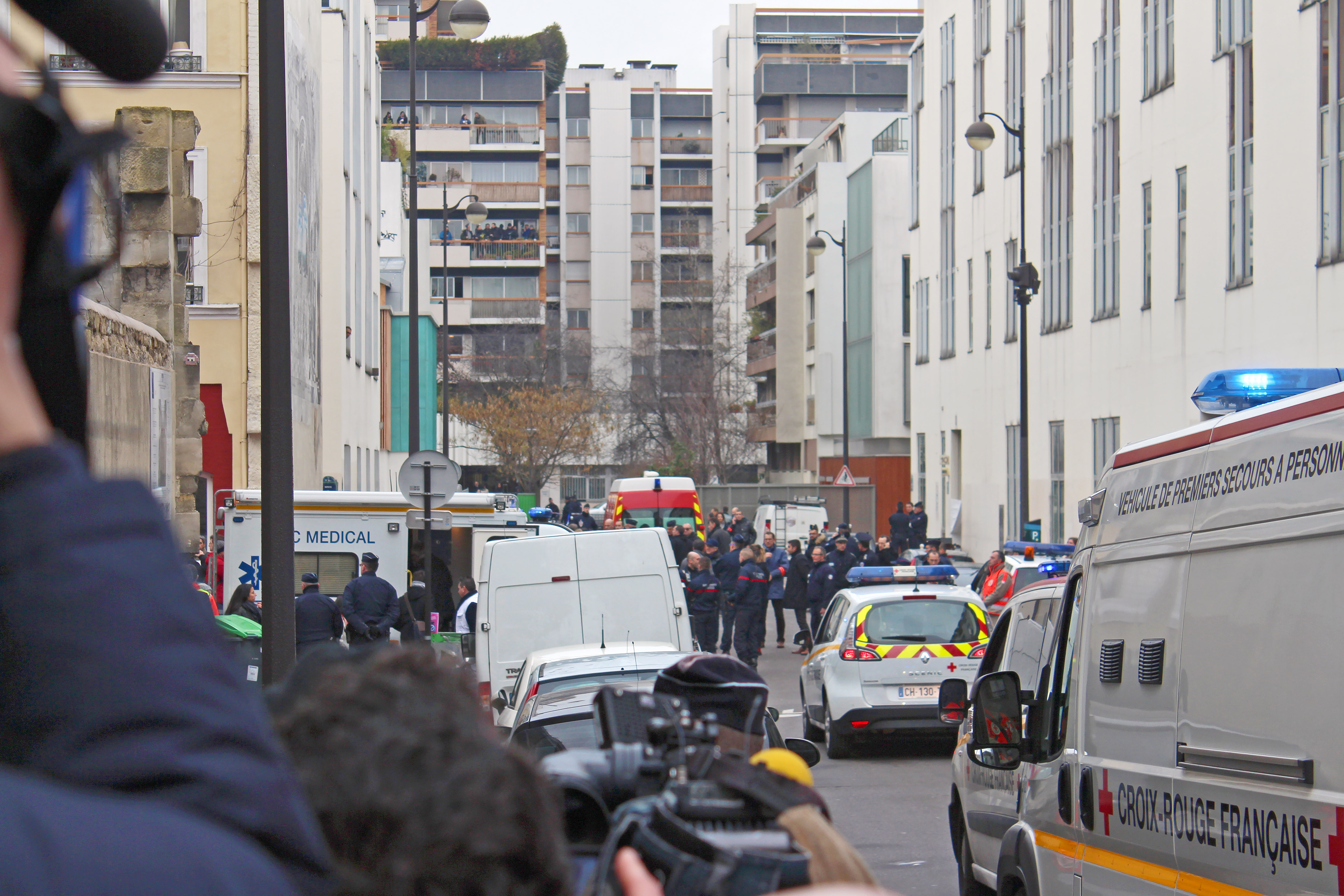
Journalists, police and emergency services in the street of the shooting, a few hours after the January 2015 attack

On 7 January 2015, two Islamist gunmen forced their way into the Paris headquarters of Charlie Hebdo and opened fire, killing twelve: staff cartoonists Charb, Cabu, Honoré, Tignous and Wolinski, economist Bernard Maris, editors Elsa Cayat and Mustapha Ourrad, guest Michel Renaud, maintenance worker Frédéric Boisseau and police officers Brinsolaro and Merabet, and wounding eleven, four of them seriously.

During the attack, the gunmen shouted "Allahu akbar" ("God is great" in Arabic) and also "the Prophet is avenged". President François Hollande described it as a "terrorist attack of the most extreme barbarity". The two gunmen were identified as Saïd and Chérif Kouachi, French Muslim brothers of Algerian descent.

==== The "survivors' issue" ====
The day after the attack, the remaining staff of Charlie Hebdo announced that publication would continue, with the following week's edition of the newspaper to be published according to the usual schedule with a print run of one million copies, up significantly from its usual 60,000. On 13 January 2015, the news came on BBC that the first issue after the massacre would come out in three million copies. On Wednesday itself it was announced that with a huge demand in France, the print run would be raised from three to five million copies. The newspaper announced the revenue from the issue would go towards the families of the victims.

The French government granted nearly €1 million to support the magazine. The Digital Innovation Press Fund (French: Fonds Google–AIPG pour l'Innovation Numérique de la presse), partially funded by Google, donated €250,000, matching a donation by the French Press and Pluralism Fund. The Guardian Media Group pledged a donation of £100,000.

==== Je suis Charlie ====
The Je suis Charlie ("I am Charlie") slogan became an endorsement of freedom of speech and press.

After the attacks, the phrase Je suis Charlie, French for "I am Charlie", was adopted by supporters of Charlie Hebdo. Many journalists embraced the expression as a rallying cry for freedom of expression and freedom of the press. The slogan was first used on Twitter and spread to the Internet at large. The Twitter account and the original "Je suis Charlie" picture bearing the phrase in white Charlie Hebdo style font on black background were created by French journalist and artist Joachim Roncin just after the massacre.

The website of Charlie Hebdo went offline shortly after the shooting, and when it returned it bore the legend Je Suis Charlie on a black background. The statement was used as the hashtag #jesuischarlie on Twitter, as computer-printed or hand-made placards and stickers, and displayed on mobile phones at vigils, and on many websites, particularly media sites. While other symbols were used, notably holding pens in the air, the phrase "Not Afraid", and tweeting certain images, "Je Suis Charlie" became more widespread.

==== Republican marches ====
A series of rallies took place in cities across France on 10–11 January 2015 to honour the victims of the Charlie Hebdo shooting, and also to voice support for freedom of speech. Luz, one of the survivors of the attack, welcomed the show of support for the magazine, but criticized the use of symbols contrary to its values. He noted: "People sang La Marseillaise. We're speaking about the memory of Charb, Tignous, Cabu, Honoré, Wolinski: they would all have abhorred that kind of attitude." Willem, another surviving cartoonist, declared support of free expression would be "naturally a good thing" but rejected that of far-right figures such as Geert Wilders and Marine Le Pen, saying: "We vomit on those who suddenly declared that they were our friends."

==== Other reactions ====
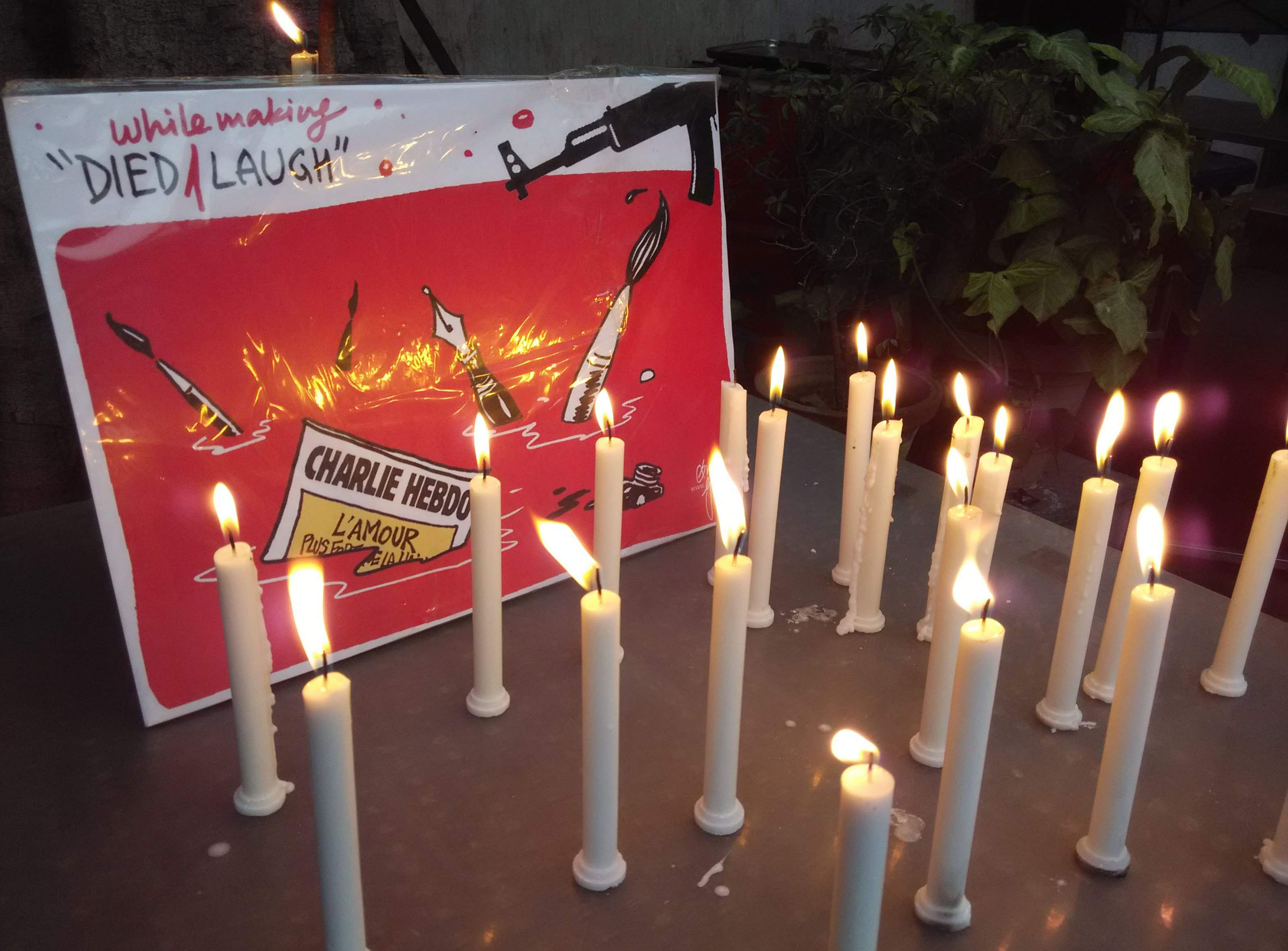
Indian journalists expressed solidarity with the victims of attack at New Delhi on 9 January 2015. Displayed cartoon by Shekhar Gurera.

Unrest in Niger following the publication of the post-attack issue of Charlie Hebdo resulted in ten deaths, dozens injured, and at least nine churches burned. The Guardian reported seven churches burned in Niamey alone. Churches were also reported to be on fire in eastern Maradi and Goure. Violent demonstrations also were prevalent in Zinder, where some burned French flags. There were violent demonstrations in Karachi in Pakistan, where Asif Hassan, a photographer working for the Agence France-Presse, was seriously injured by a shot to the chest. In Algiers and Jordan, protesters clashed with police, while peaceful demonstrations were held in Khartoum, Sudan, Russia, Mali, Senegal, and Mauritania.

Chechen leader Ramzan Kadyrov declared a regional holiday and denounced "people without spiritual and moral values" in front of an audience estimated to range between 600,000 and a million people in a demonstration in Grozny. One week after the murders, Donald Trump mocked Charlie Hebdo by saying the magazine reminded him of Spy, another "nasty and dishonest" satirical publication, and that the magazine was on the verge of financial collapse.

The Islamic Human Rights Commission, a British NGO, gave their 2015 international "Islamophobe of the Year" award to Charlie Hebdo, whereas another British organisation, the National Secular Society, awarded the Charlie Hebdo staff with Secularist of the Year 2015 "for their courageous response to the terror attack". The magazine said it would donate the associated £5,000 prize money to the fund that supports the families of the murdered cartoonists.

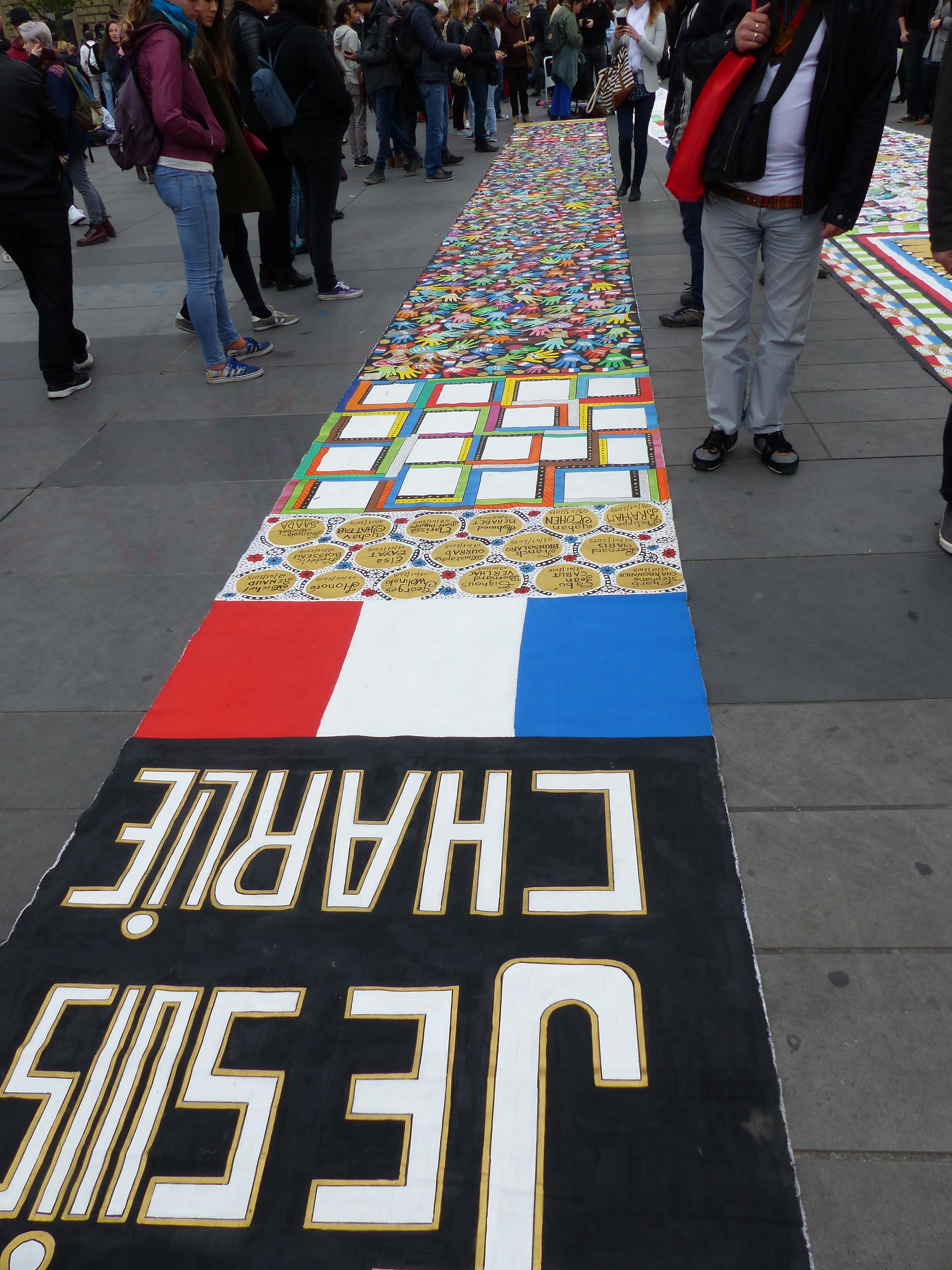
Place de la République, 2016.05.15

=== 2020 republication of Muhammad caricatures ===
On 1 September 2020, Charlie Hebdo announced that it would republish caricatures depicting Muhammad that sparked violent protests, ahead of a trial of suspected perpetrators of the mass shooting in January 2015 scheduled the following day. Instagram suspended two accounts belonging to two Charlie Hebdo employees for several hours after they had published the caricatures of Muhammad. The accounts were reinstated after Instagram found they had been targeted by a reporting campaign by those who wished to censor the caricatures.

=== 2020 attack ===
On 25 September 2020, weeks after the Muhammad caricature republications, two people were critically injured by an assailant during a stabbing attack outside the magazine's former headquarters. The building is now used by a television production company, and the two wounded victims were workers of the company. The perpetrator fled the scene but was arrested nearby. Six other people were arrested in connection to the attack.

A day later, the perpetrator was identified as Zaheer Hassan Mehmood, a 25-year-old allegedly from Pakistan, who claimed to have arrived as an unaccompanied minor refugee in France in 2018. He confessed to his actions and said he had acted in vengeance for the Muhammad caricature republications. He also reported that "he didn't know that the headquarters moved to another location".

Interior minister of France Gérald Darmanin called the attack "fundamentally an act of Islamist terrorism". Jean Castex, the then French prime minister, said "the enemies of the republic will not win" and pledged to escalate the fight against terrorism. Emmanuel Macron faced backlash when he defended the caricatures. Many Muslims called for French products to be boycotted in their countries, while European leaders supported his remarks. Supermarkets in Kuwait and Qatar boycotted French goods.

=== 2020 publication of Erdoğan cartoon ===
Turkish president Recep Tayyip Erdoğan condemned Charlie Hebdo after he found out that he was mocked in a front-page caricature. In the said cartoon, Erdoğan was portrayed wearing his underwear, drinking alcohol, and lifting the skirt of a woman dressed in a hijab to reveal her buttocks. Accompanying it was a caption that read "Erdogan: He's very funny in private". This came as tensions between Erdoğan and French president Emmanuel Macron rose over Macron's earlier comments on the Muhammad caricature republications, which were responded to by France recalling its ambassador to Ankara, as well as protests against France and calls for a boycott of French goods in several Muslim-majority countries, including Turkey, where Erdoğan himself called for such a boycott. The tensions were, in turn, caused by the beheading of schoolteacher Samuel Paty in France after he showed caricatures of Muhammad, which were published by Charlie Hebdo, to his students as part of a lesson on free speech.

While he admitted to have not yet seen the cartoon, Erdoğan called the images "despicable", "insulting", and "disgusting", and accused Charlie Hebdo of "cultural racism" and sowing "the seeds of hatred and animosity". The Turkish government was also reported to take legal and diplomatic action. The state-run Anadolu Agency stated that the Ankara Chief Prosecutor's Office had already launched an investigation into the directors of Charlie Hebdo. In response Macron promised to defend the right to freedom of expression and freedom of publication. Leaders of other Muslim-majority countries, such as Iranian supreme leader Ali Khamenei and Pakistani prime minister Imran Khan also criticised Macron and called for action against Islamophobia. On the contrary, Indian prime minister Narendra Modi and other European leaders, such as Danish foreign minister Jeppe Kofod, defended Macron.

=== Other controversies ===
Coco's artwork on the front cover of Charlie Hebdo on 14 September 2015 illustrates a parody of racist attitudes that proclaim that migrants are "welcome" but are treated as footstools. The speech balloon, "This [land] is your home", is a reference to a famous nationalist phrase, "This is our home".

Since January 2015, Charlie Hebdo has continued to be embroiled in controversy. Daniel Schneidermann argues that the 2015 attack raised the profile of the paper internationally with non-Francophone audiences, meaning that only parts of the paper are selectively translated into English, making it easy to misrepresent the editorial stance of the publication and the purpose of provocative work. In February 2015, Charlie Hebdo was accused of attacking freedom of press when its lawyer Richard Malka tried to prevent the publication of the magazine Charpie Hebdo, a pastiche of Charlie Hebdo (In this context, charpie may translate to shredded).

In October 2015, Nadine Morano was depicted as a baby with Down syndrome in the arms of General de Gaulle after making remarks supporting the National Front. This was criticized as a reference to de Gaulle's daughter, Anne, and as disparaging to people with disabilities. A response from a reader, a mother with a Down syndrome daughter, commented on how harmful this depiction was for families who have family members with Down syndrome, by saying "The stupidity is racism, it's intolerance, it's Morano. The stupidity isn't trisomy [Down's syndrome]". (Note: "[L]a bêtise, c'est le racisme, c'est l'intolérance, c'est Morano. La bêtise, ce n'est pas la trisomie.")

The 14 September 2015 edition's cover cartoon by Coco depicted a migrant being maltreated by a man who proclaims "welcome to refugees" – in order to parody European claims about compassion. Riss wrote an editorial on the European migrant crisis, arguing that it was hypocritical for Hungarian politicians to declare themselves compassionate because of their Christian beliefs, but at the same time reject migrants from Syria. Riss parodied anti-immigrant attitudes by featuring a cartoon with a caricature of Jesus walking on water next to a drowning Muslim boy, with the caption "this is how we know Europe is Christian". The cartoons were widely seen as gallows humour in France, but prompted another wave of controversy abroad. That issue also included a caricature of the dead body of Syrian Kurdish refugee child Alan Kurdi next to a McDonald's sign with the caption, "So close to the goal". In response to criticism, Coco said that she was criticising the consumerist society that was being sold to migrants like a dream. After the New Year's Eve sexual assaults in Germany, a January 2016 edition included a cartoon by Riss about Kurdi, reflecting fickle sentiment towards refugees by including a caption questioning whether the boy would have grown up to be an "ass groper in Germany".

Following the crash of Metrojet Flight 9268 in October 2015, which killed 224 civilians, mostly Russians, and was seen by UK and US authorities as a probable terrorist bombing, Charlie Hebdo published cartoons which were perceived in Russia as mocking the victims of the tragedy. One of the cartoons showed a victim's blue-eyed skull and a burned-out plane on the ground, with the caption: "The dangers of Russian low cost" flights. The other showed pieces of the plane falling on an Islamic State (ISIS) fighter with the caption: "Russia's air force intensifies its bombing". A spokesman for Vladimir Putin called the artwork "sacrilege", and members of the State Duma called for the magazine to be banned as extremist literature and demanded an apology from France.

In March 2016, one year after the attack, the weekly featured a caricature of Yahweh with a Kalashnikov rifle. The Vatican and Jewish groups said they were offended, and the Associated Press censored images of the cover. In the same month, Charlie Hebdo published a front page following the 2016 Brussels bombings, parodying the Belgian singer Stromae's song Papaoutai, in which Stromae asks "Papa où t'es?" (Where are you dad?) and dismembered body parts reply "here". The cover upset the Belgian public and it particularly upset Stromae's family, because his father was murdered in the Rwandan genocide.

On 2 September 2016, following a major earthquake in Italy which caused 294 deaths, the magazine published a cartoon in which the earthquake victims are depicted as pasta dishes, under the title "Séisme à l'italienne". In response to the reaction of Italians unleashed on social networks, the cartoonist Coco pointed out with another cartoon on the official Facebook page of the magazine, "Italians ... it's not Charlie Hebdo who builds your houses, it's the Mafia!" The French ambassador in Rome responded that the French government's position on the Italian earthquake is not that expressed by Charlie Hebdo.

On 29 December 2016, Russia accused Charlie Hebdo of 'mocking' the Black Sea plane crash after publishing 'inhuman' cartoons about the disaster. In one reference to the crash, which claimed 92 lives, including 64 members of the Alexandrov Ensemble choir, the French magazine depicted a jet hurtling downwards along with words translated as "Bad news ... Putin wasn't on board". Russian defence spokesman called cartoons "a poorly-created abomination". A Russian Defense Ministry spokesman said: "If such, I dare say, 'artistry' is the real manifestation of 'Western values', then those who hold and support them are doomed,"

On 13 March 2021, Charlie Hebdo featured a controversial cartoon titled "Why I Left Buckingham Palace" on its front page. The illustration depicted Queen Elizabeth II kneeling on the neck of Meghan, Duchess of Sussex, whose head was next to a quote bubble that read "Because I couldn't breathe". It was published following Oprah Winfrey's interview of the Duchess and her partner, Prince Harry, Duke of Sussex, in which the couple accused the royal family of making racist hassles. The cartoon drew backlash from many social media users, as it satirically paralleled the incidents within the royal family with the murder of George Floyd by Minneapolis police officer Derek Chauvin.

On 7 February 2023, one day after severe earthquakes in Turkey and Syria, Charlie Hebdo published a caricature of the event via its Twitter account. It was drawn by Juin, and read as follows: "Earthquake in Turkey. No need to send in tanks!" (French: Séisme en Turquie. Même pas besoin d'envoyer de chars!). The cartoon was controversial on social media, and was criticised by Al Bawaba journalist Sally Shakkour as racist.

The September 2024 issue which featured the Mazan rapes earned outrage from women's rights activists. In October 2024, the French magazine published another sketch about the case of the rape of Giselle Pelicot (Mazan rape case) in France, which sparked significant public reaction.

On 23 December 2025 a carton depicting Rokhaya Diallo was published on Charlie Hebdo, which she criticized as "racist" and "colonial".

On 9 January 2026, on the day of state funeral for Crans-Montana fire victims a cartoon was published on Charlie Hebdo. A Swiss lawyer and his wife have filed a criminal complaint against Charlie Hebdo.

== Legal issues ==
=== Mosque of Paris v. Val (2007) ===
In 2007 the Grand Mosque of Paris began criminal proceedings against the chief-editor of Charlie Hebdo, Philipe Val, under France's hate speech laws for publicly abusing a group on the ground of their religion. The lawsuit was limited to three specific cartoons, including one depicting Muhammad carrying a bomb in his turban. In March 2007 a Paris court acquitted Val, finding that it was fundamentalists, rather than Muslims, who were being ridiculed in the cartoons.

=== Siné sacking (2008) ===
On 2 July 2008, a column by the cartoonist Siné (Maurice Sinet) appeared in Charlie Hebdo citing a rumour that Jean Sarkozy, son of Nicolas Sarkozy, had announced his intention to convert to Judaism before marrying his fiancée, Jewish heiress Jessica Sebaoun-Darty. Siné added, "he'll go far, this lad!" This led to complaints of antisemitism. The magazine's editor, Philippe Val, ordered Siné to write a letter of apology or face termination. The cartoonist said he would rather "cut his own balls off", and was promptly fired. Both sides subsequently filed lawsuits, and in December 2010, Siné won a €40,000 court judgment against his former publisher for wrongful termination.

=== Amatrice v. Charlie Hebdo (2016) ===
In October 2016, the town council and municipality of the Italian town Amatrice, which was hit by an earthquake with hundreds dead and was previously known primarily for the sugo all'amatriciana pasta sauce, led a lawsuit against Charlie Hebdo for "aggravated defamation", following publication of a series of cartoons titled 'Earthquake Italian style'. It depicted victims of the earthquake as Italian dishes and their blood as sauce. The trial of this case opened on 9 October 2020 at the Paris court.

=== Complaint in Turkey (2020) ===
In October 2020, prosecutors in the judicial system of Turkey began legal investigations into a criminal complaint filed by Turkish president Recep Tayyip Erdoğan, whose lawyers argued that the cartoon depicting their client should be considered "libel" and was "not covered by freedom of expression". In Turkey, insulting the president is punishable by four years in prison.

== Financial issues ==
Charlie Hebdo had struggled financially since its establishment until 2015. As the magazine was facing a loss of €100,000 by the end of 2014, it sought donations from readers to no avail. The international attention to the magazine following the 2015 attack revived the publication, bringing some €4 million in donations from individuals, corporations and institutions, as well as a revenue of €15 million from subscriptions and newsstands between January and October 2015. According to figures confirmed by the magazine, it gained more than €60 million in 2015, which declined to €19.4 million in 2016. As of 2018 it was spending €1–1.5 million annually for security services, according to Riss.

== Ownership ==
As of March 2011, Charlie Hebdo was owned by Charb (600 shares), Riss (599 shares), finance director Éric Portheault (299 shares), and Cabu and Bernard Maris with one share each. Since 2016, cartoonist Riss has been the publishing director of the magazine, and he owns 70% of the shares. The remaining 30% is owned by Éric Portheault. Following the 2015 attack, Charb's 40% stake in Charlie Hebdo was purchased from his parents by Riss and Eric Portheault, who were as of July 2015 sole shareholders in the paper. Charlie Hebdo switched to a new legal press publisher status which requires 70% of profits to be reinvested.

== Staff ==
- Gérard Biard, editor
- Sylvie Coma
- Riss, cartoonist, managing editor, director of publication
- Catherine Meurisse, cartoonist
- Coco, cartoonist
- Willem, cartoonist
- Walter Foolz, cartoonist
- Babouse, cartoonist
- Antonio Fischetti, journalist
- Zineb El Rhazoui, journalist
- Philippe Lançon, critic
- Fabrice Nicolino, journalist
- Sigolène Vinson, journalist
- Laurent Léger, journalist
- Jean-Baptiste Thoret, critic
- Mathieu Madénian, columnist
- Simon Fieschi, webmaster († 2024)
- Richard Malka, lawyer
- Eric Portheault, finance manager

== Accolades ==
On 5 May 2015, Charlie Hebdo was awarded the PEN/Toni and James C. Goodale Freedom of Expression Courage Award at the PEN American Center Literary Gala in New York City. Granting the prize to Charlie Hebdo sparked vast controversy among writers, and 175 prominent authors boycotted the event due to "cultural intolerance" of the magazine.

== See also ==
- Le Canard enchaîné, a French satirical weekly newspaper
- Private Eye, a British satirical fortnightly magazine
- MAD Magazine, an American satirical bi-monthly magazine
