= Coco (cartoonist) =

French cartoonist

- Coco at the Republican marches of 2015
- Born: Corinne Rey; 21 August 1982 (age 44) Annemasse, France
- Area: Cartoonist
- Pseudonym: Coco

Signature
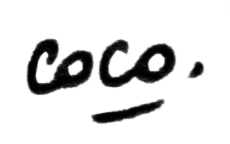

Corinne Rey (born 21 August 1982) is a French cartoonist who publishes under the pen name Coco.

== Biography ==
Corinne Rey was born 21 August 1982 in Annemasse in eastern France. Under the pen name "Coco" she has published in periodicals such as Charlie Hebdo, Les Inrockuptibles, and L'Écho des savanes. Public figures such as politicians Dominique Strauss-Kahn and François Hollande are frequent targets of her political cartoons. She has won a number of awards for her cartooning.

Rey has worked for Charlie Hebdo since 2009, where she did editing and contributed editorial cartoons. She was present at the 2015 massacre at the Charlie Hebdo offices in which twelve were killed. On 7 January 2015, two masked gunmen approached her at the building that houses the Charlie Hebdo offices. They threatened to kill her, and her young daughter, if she did not enter the passcode to enter the building. They took her to the Charlie Hebdo on the second floor, where she witnessed them kill cartoonists Georges Wolinski and Cabu as she hid under a desk. The gunmen proceeded to another room and fired on the fifteen people in a meeting in progress.

== Works cited ==
- Clarín staff (8 January 2015). "Quién es Coco, la diseñadora amenazada por los terroristas para entrar a la revista". Clarín (in Spanish).
- Jourdan, Camille (7 November 2014). "Pour survivre, Charlie Hebdo fait la quête". Les Inrockuptibles (in French).
- Le Messager staff (7 January 2015). "Dessinatrice à Charlie Hebdo, l'Annemassienne "Coco" témoigne". Le Messager (in French). Groupe La Voix. Archived from the original on 12 January 2015.
- Perez, Delphine (9 January 2015). "Zoom : qui sont les filles de Charlie Hebdo?". Le Parisien.
