= Philippe Honoré (cartoonist) =

French cartoonist

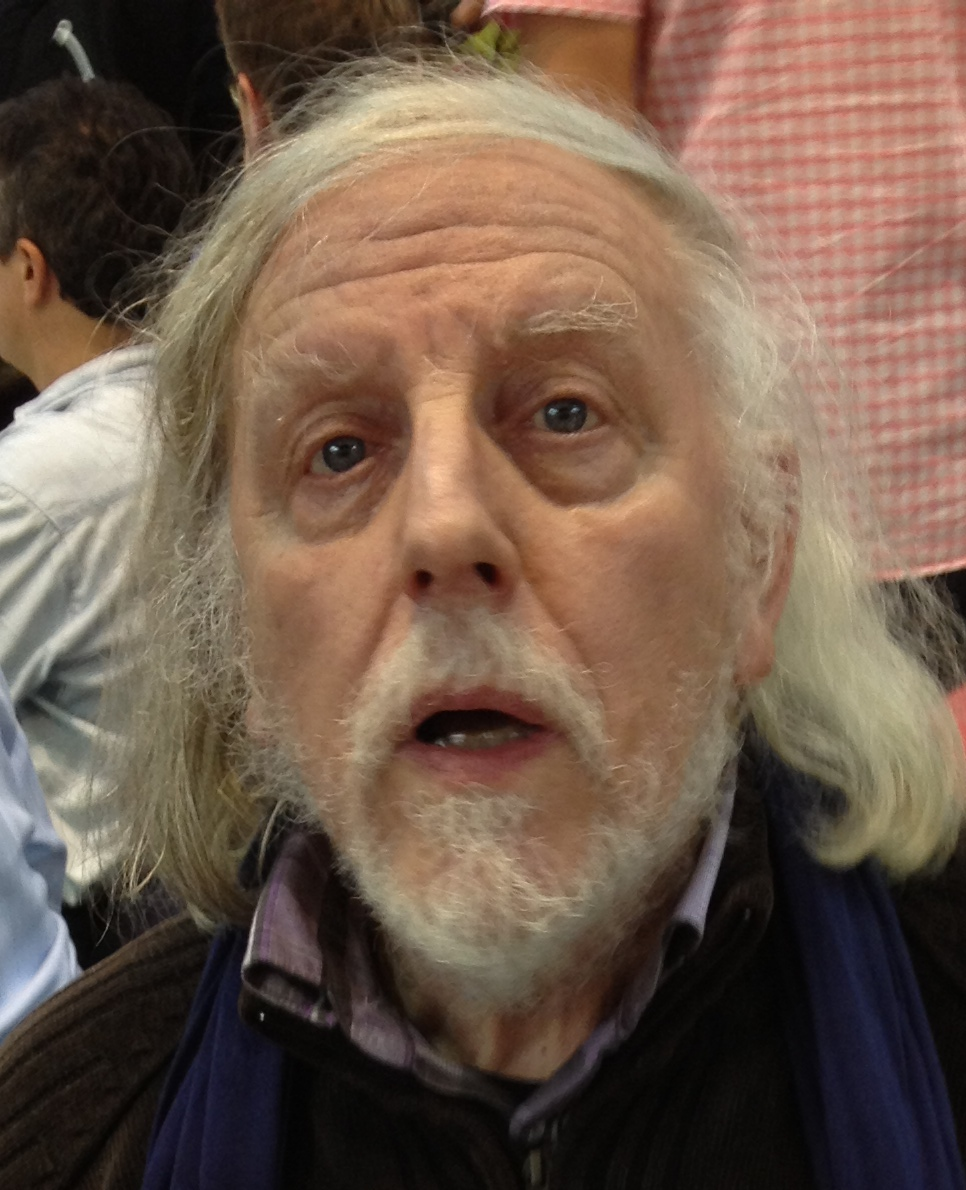
- Honoré in 2012
- Born: 25 November 1941 Vichy, France
- Died: 7 January 2015 (aged 73) Paris, France
- Area: Cartoonist
- Pseudonym: Honoré

Signature
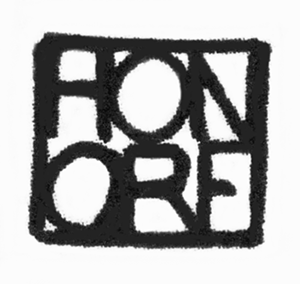

Philippe Paul-Louis Juste Honoré (French: [ɔnɔʁe]; 25 November 1941 – 7 January 2015), known by the pen-name Honoré, was a French cartoonist and a long-time staff member of Charlie Hebdo.

Honoré was among five cartoonists assassinated on 7 January 2015, during the shooting attack on the Charlie Hebdo newspaper office.

== Biography ==
Born in Vichy, Honoré grew up in Pau. Honoré was a self-taught artist, getting published for the first time in 1957 in the regional newspaper Sud-Ouest.

He worked as an industrial designer for the Société Nationale des Gaz du Sud-Ouest, a natural gas supplier.

Honoré had a long career in newspaper and magazine cartoons, working with dozens of publications, including Sud-Ouest, Libération, Le Monde, Les Inrockuptibles, La Vie ouvrière, Charlie Mensuel, Le Matin, and Expressen. He illustrated many book covers, including the anniversary edition of Petit Larousse. His artwork was featured in a number of group exhibitions.

He became a staff cartoonist for Charlie Hebdo in 1992. With its thick line (somewhat reminiscent of woodcuts), and strong reliance on black-and-white, Honoré's style stood out from the other Charlie Hebdo cartoonists.

The last cartoon tweeted by Charlie Hebdo minutes before the attack was an illustration by Honoré of the ISIS leader, Abu Bakr Al Baghdadi, offering formal New Year's wishes.

Honoré was critically wounded during the attack, and died in the hospital emergency room.

== Publications ==
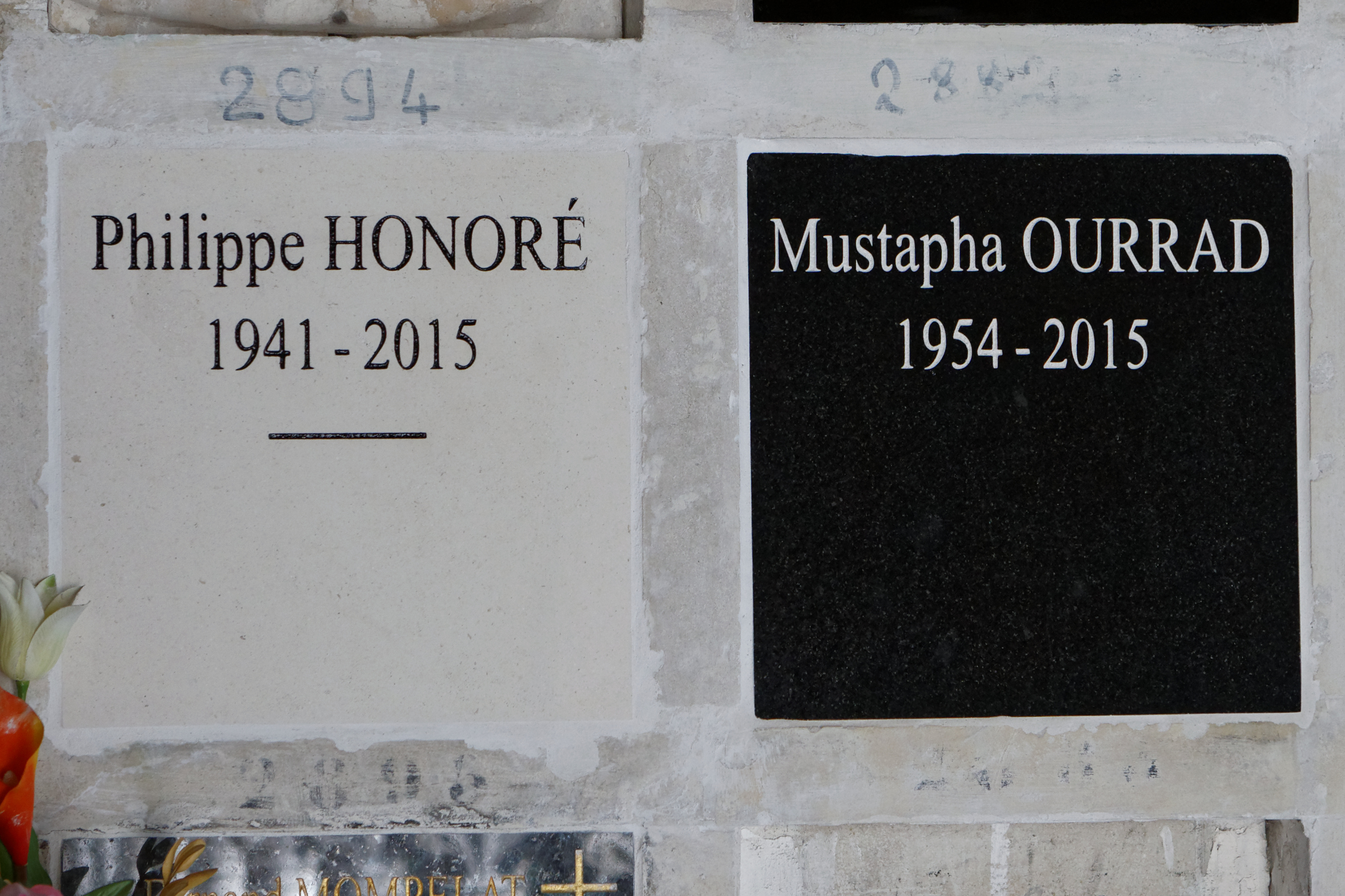
Columbarium niche at Père Lachaise Cemetery

Press

- Sud-Ouest
- Charlie Hebdo
- Lire
- Le Magazine littéraire
- Libération
- Le Monde
- Globe
- L'Événement du jeudi
- Les Inrockuptibles
- La Vie ouvrière
- Charlie Mensuel
- Le Matin
- La Grosse Bertha
- Expressen

Illustrations

- 1984: Josette Larchier-Boulanger, Les Hommes du nucléaire, pour EDF / GRETS, éd. Sodel, Paris, 16 p.
- 1989: Jean-Jérome Bertolus, Philippe Eliakim, Éric Walther, Guide SVP de vos intérêts: Argent, consommation, famille, vie pratique, pour SVP, éd. Jean-Pierre de Monza, Paris, 284 p. ISBN 2-908071-01-0.
- 1990: Laurie Laufer, Le Paquet volé: Une histoire de saute-ruisseau, éd. Turbulences, coll. « Histoires vraies », Paris, 119 p. ISBN 2-7082-2745-9.
- 1991: Jean-Pierre de Monza (dir.), Guide SVP de vos intérêts: 2000 réponses utiles à vos problèmes, famille, argent..., pour SVP, éd. Jean-Pierre de Monza, Paris, 476 p. ISBN 2-908071-03-7.
- 1994: Brigitte de Gastines, Jean Pierre de Monza, Guide SVP des particuliers: 2000 réponses indispensables, vie pratique, placements, loisirs, démarches..., pour SVP, éd. SVP, Paris, 480 p. ISBN 2-909661-03-2.
- 2002: Alexandre Vialatte, Bestiaire, textes choisis par Michaël Lainé, éd. Arléa, Paris, 116 p. ISBN 2-86959-555-7; rééd. 2007, coll. "Arléa-poche" (No. 111), 258 p. ISBN 978-2-86959-776-1.
- 2007: Antonio Fischetti, La Symphonie animale: Comment les bêtes utilisent le son, éd. Vuibert, Paris, et Arte, Issy-les-Moulineaux, 142 p. + DVD . ISBN 978-2-7117-7145-5.
- 2009: Le Petit Larousse illustré 2010, éd. Larousse, Paris . ISBN 978-2-03-584078-3.
- 2012: Will Cuppy, Comment attirer le wombat, éd. Wombat, p. 192. ISBN 2-91918-619-1.

Graphic albums

- 1985 : Honoré, éd. Un bon dessin vaut mieux qu'un long discours, Paris, p. 32.
- Recueils des rébus publiés dans Lire, éd. Arléa, Paris :
  - 2001 : Cent rébus littéraires : avec leur question-devinette et leurs solutions, 200 p. ISBN 2-86959-557-3.
  - 2003 : Vingt-cinq rébus littéraires en cartes postales, 4 × 25 cartes postales : Livret 1 . ISBN 2-86959-639-1, Livret 2 . ISBN 2-86959-640-5, Livret 3 . ISBN 2-86959-641-3, Livret 4 . ISBN 2-86959-642-1.
  - 2006 : Cent nouveaux rébus littéraires : avec leur question-devinette et leurs solutions, 205 p. ISBN 2-86959-753-3.
- 2011 : Je hais les petites phrases, éd. Les Échappés p. 112, . ISBN 2-35766-046-5.

Graphic novels

- 1995 : Ouvert le jour et la nuit, textes de Rufus, Glénat, coll. « Carton noir », Paris, p. 48, ISBN 2-7234-1826-X.

== See also ==
- List of journalists killed in Europe
