= Siné =

French cartoonist

Maurice Sinet
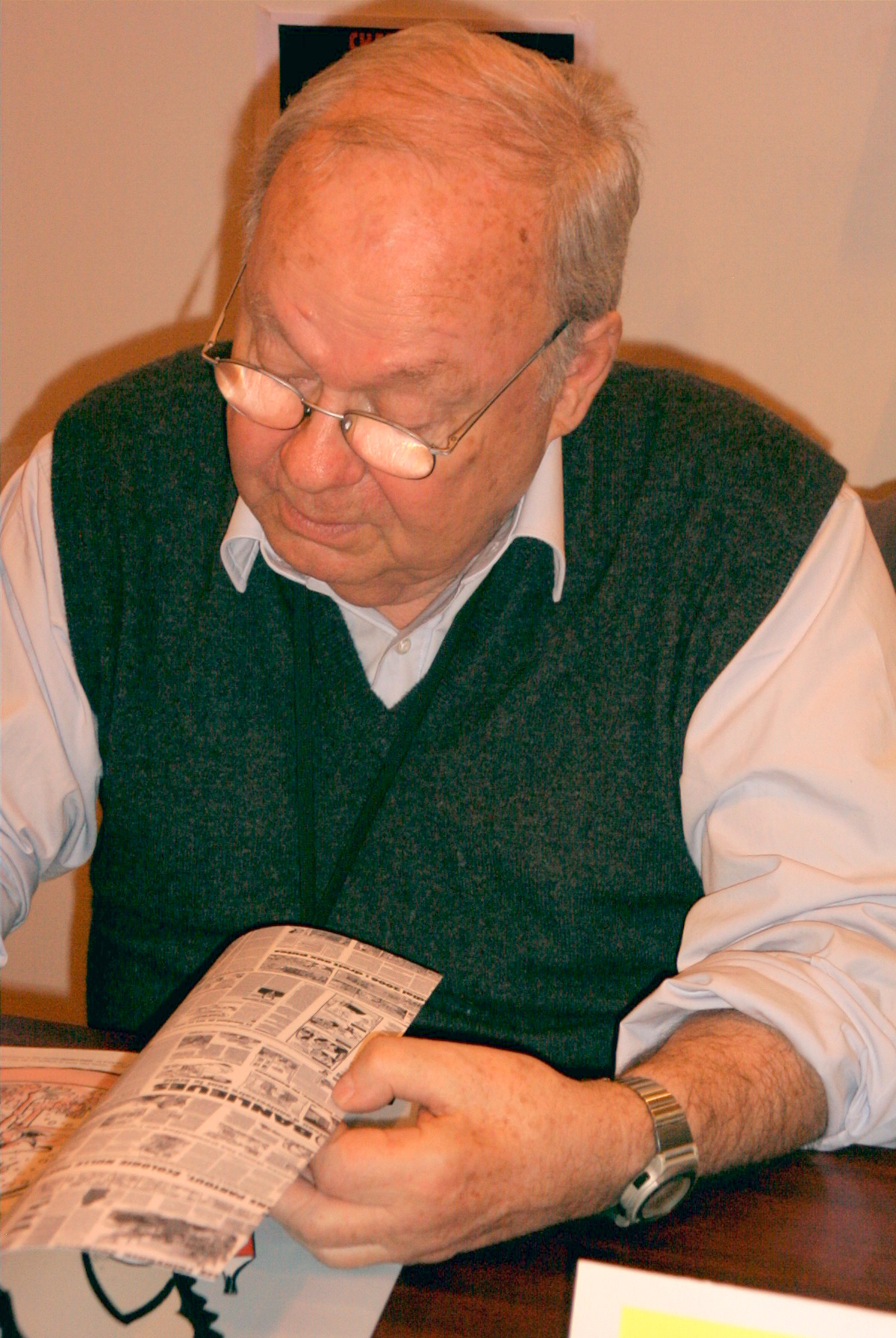
- Siné in March 2007
- Born: Maurice Albert Sinet; 31 December 1928 Paris, France
- Died: 5 May 2016 (aged 87) Paris, France
- Area: Political cartoons
- Pseudonym: Siné
- Notable works: Complainte sans Paroles; Siné Massacre
- Awards: Prix de l'Humour noir, 1955

Maurice Albert Sinet (French pronunciation: [mɔʁis albɛʁ sine]; 31 December 1928 – 5 May 2016), known professionally as Siné (pronounced [sine]), was a French political cartoonist. His work is noted for its anti-capitalism, anti-clericalism, anti-colonialism, antisemitism, and anarchism.

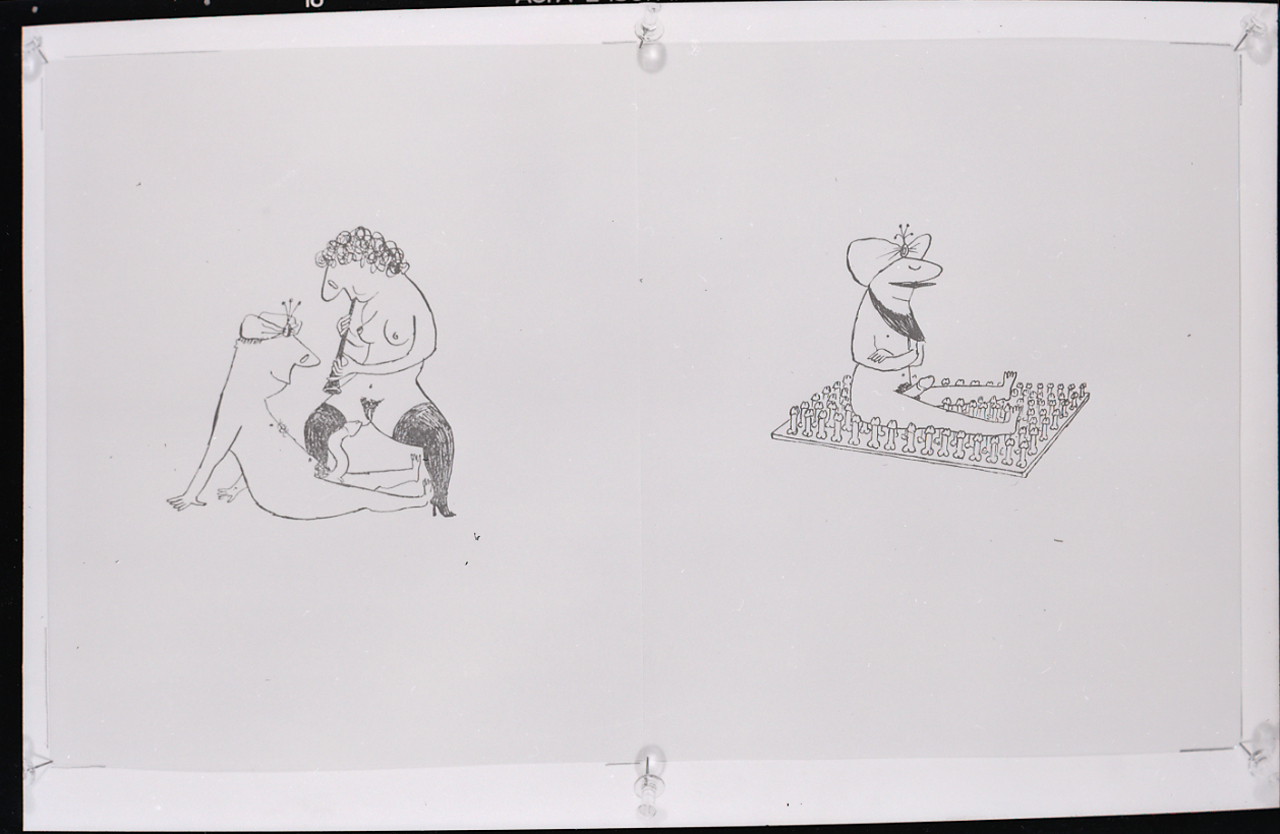
Drawings in a photo by Paolo Monti (1960)

== Biography ==
In reviewing Siné Massacre, the British satirical magazine Private Eye described Siné's cartoons as "grotesque", and criticised publisher Penguin Books for its managerial incompetence.

In 1965 Siné became involved in a power struggle at Penguin Books. During an attempt by chief editor Tony Godwin and the board of directors to remove the company founder Allen Lane, Lane stole and burned the entire print run of the English edition of Siné's book Massacre, which was reportedly deeply offensive.

== Death ==
Siné died after undergoing surgery at a hospital in Paris on 5 May 2016, aged 87. He had been battling cancer for several years.

== Controversy and sacking ==
In 1982, regarding Israel and Palestine, Siné gave an interview on the radio during which he stated: "Yes, I am anti-Semitic and I am not scared to admit it [...] I want all Jews to live in fear, unless they are pro-Palestinian. Let them die." He later apologised for his comments.

In July 2008, Siné's column in the magazine Charlie Hebdo contained this comment on Jean Sarkozy's rumoured impending conversion to Judaism so he could marry a Jewish heiress of the wealthy Darty family, Jessica Sebaoun-Darty: "He'll go a long way in life, this lad!" Sarkozy and Sebaoun-Darty married but Sarkozy has affirmed that he did not convert to Judaism. The incident led to complaints of antisemitism and journalist Claude Askolovitch described the comments as antisemitic.

The magazine's editor, Philippe Val, ordered Siné to write a letter of apology or face termination. The cartoonist said he would rather "cut his own balls off", and was promptly fired. Both sides subsequently filed lawsuits, and in December 2010, Siné won a 40,000-euro court judgment against his former publisher for wrongful termination. In December 2012, the Paris Court of Appeal increased the damages payable to 90,000 Euro.

Siné reported a death threat posted on a site run by the Jewish Defense League. The text said "20 centimeters of stainless steel in the gut, that should teach the bastard to stop and think."
