= Riss (cartoonist) =

French cartoonist and author (born 1966)

Laurent Sourisseau
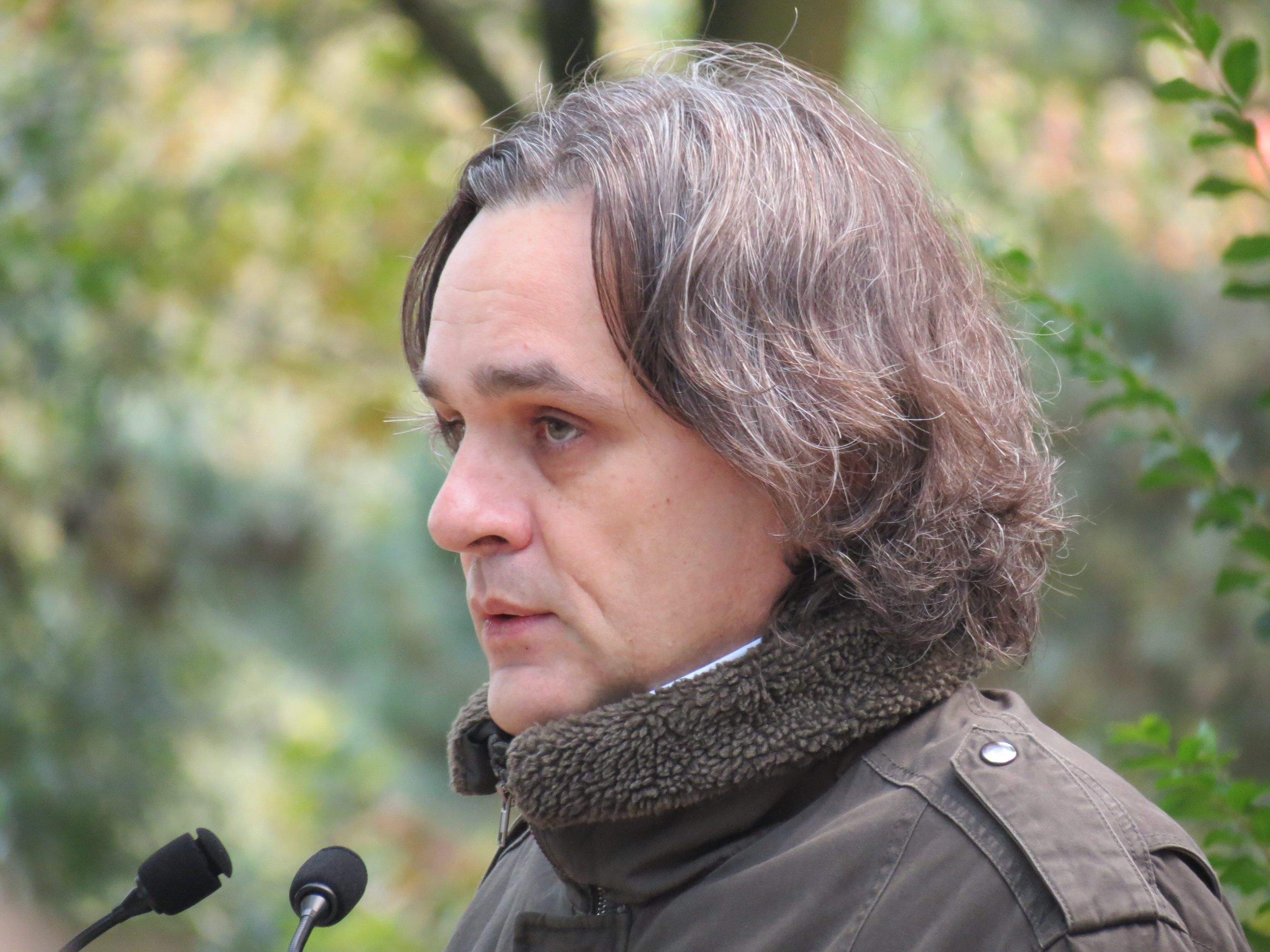
- Born: 20 September 1966 (age 59); Melun, France
- Occupations: Cartoonist, publishing director
- Writing career
- Pen name: Riss

Signature
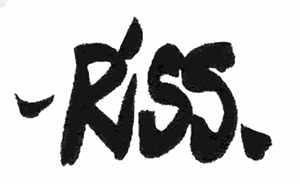

Laurent "Riss" Sourisseau (French: [suʁiso]; born 20 September 1966) is a French cartoonist, author and publisher. Since 1992, he has worked for the French satirical weekly newspaper Charlie Hebdo and is now its majority owner.

== Career ==
Sourisseau is the author of several books printed in France and his political cartoons appear often on the cover of Charlie Hebdo

== Charlie Hebdo shooting ==
On 7 January 2015 Sourisseau was shot and wounded in the shoulder during the terrorist attack on the Charlie Hebdo office. From the hospital, he drew four cartoons for the issue of Charlie Hebdo released on 14 January.

Six months after the attack, Soursseau said he would no longer draw the Muslim Prophet Muhammad, stating that "We've done our job. We have defended the right to caricature."

Riss is now the publishing director of the magazine, and he owns 70% of the shares.

== Works ==
- The Great Trial by Charlie Hebdo: The trial Papon collective scenario Editions Charlie Hebdo / Rotary 1998
- Granny Woman Practice Noon Seeking 1999 ( ISBN 978-2862746432 )
- The Tour de France of the Crime, Charlie Hebdo, Special Issue No. 11, Editions Rotary 2000
- Face kärchée of Sarkozy, with Richard Malka and Philippe Cohen (screenplay), Issy-les-Moulineaux: Vents d'Ouest, Paris: Fayard, p 155, 2006 (. ISBN 2-7493-0309-5 )
- Survey Nicolas Sarkozy before his accession to the presidency of the Republic during the 2007 presidential election; followed after his election, the Countenance of
- Face kärchée Sarkozy's more: Sarko 1 with Richard Malka and Philippe Cohen (screenplay), 37 p 2007 (. ISBN 978-2-7493-0400-7 )
- Presidential 2007: Campaign blog of Charlie Hebdo, with Anne-Sophie Mercier, Editions Jean-Claude Gawsewitch 2007 ( ISBN 978-2350130996 )
- I Do Not Like School, Hoëbeke 2007 ( ISBN 978-2842302931 )
- The American Dream Explained to the Disbelievers, Albin Michel, 2007 ( ISBN 978-2226177308 )
- Nothing to masturbate, Supplement No. 828 of Charlie Hebdo (30 April), 32 p., 2008
- Carla and Carlito or Castle Life with Richard Malka and Philippe Cohen (screenplay), ed. 12a -Fayard, 64 pp., 2008 ( ISBN 978-2-35648-034-7 )
- My First Crusade, Georgie Bush goes to War, published The Fumbles, 2008 ( ISBN 978-2357660007 )
- Obama, what else? With Jean-Luc Hees, ed. The Fumbles, 2009 ( ISBN 978-2357660083 )
- Hitler in my Living Room. Private Photos of Germany from 1933 to 1945, ed. The Fumbles, 2009 ( ISBN 978-2357660144 )

Participation in collective works

- Collective, Mozart being murdered, Albin Michel, 2006, Charb, Catherine Meurisse, Luz, Tignous and Jul
- Holiday Book of Charlie Hebdo, published The Fumble, 2009, Catherine Meurisse, Charb and Luz
- Freedom - Equality - Fraternity cartoons collections
- The brief of Charlie Hebdo, published The Fumbles 2008
- Blame Society, collective, ed. 12a, 2008
