= Luz (cartoonist) =

French cartoonist

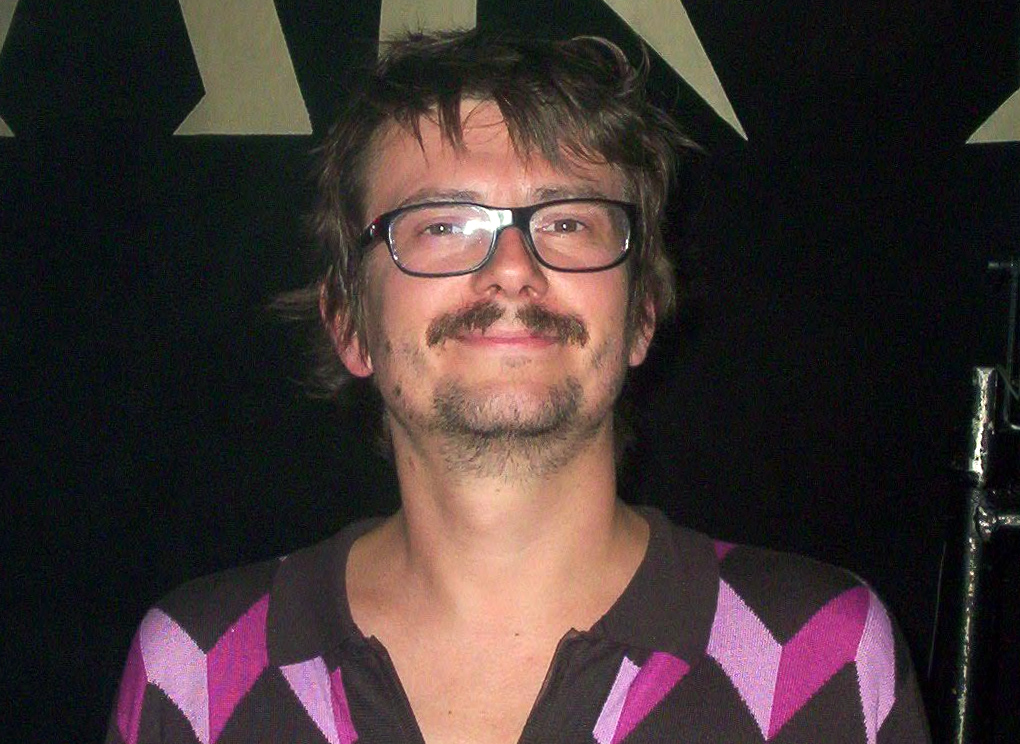
- Born: Rénald Luzier; 7 January 1972 (age 54); Tours, France
- Occupation: Former cartoonist

Rénald Luzier (born 7 January 1972), known by his pen name Luz, is a French cartoonist. He is a former contributor to the satirical magazine Charlie Hebdo and drew the cover of the first issue of the publication following the 2015 Charlie Hebdo shooting, an image of Muhammad holding a sign reading "Je suis Charlie" under the slogan "All is Forgiven".

Luz has contributed to a number of publications including La Grosse Bertha, Les Inrockuptibles, Magic, Ferraille, L'Écho des Savanes, and Fluide Glacial. He was awarded the Prix Tournesol at the Angoulême International Comics Festival in 2003 for his work Cambouis, a collection of his own fanzine that was published by L'Association in 2002.

Luz narrowly missed becoming a victim of the Charlie Hebdo shooting (on his birthday) because he was late for work and turned up just in time to see the perpetrators fleeing.

Luz left Charlie Hebdo in October 2015. He later drew cartoons for Cahiers du Cinéma. In 2018, he published Indélébiles, a graphic novel about his 23 years of experience working at Charlie Hebdo. It was awarded the France Info Prize.
