= Cabu =

French caricaturist (1938–2015)

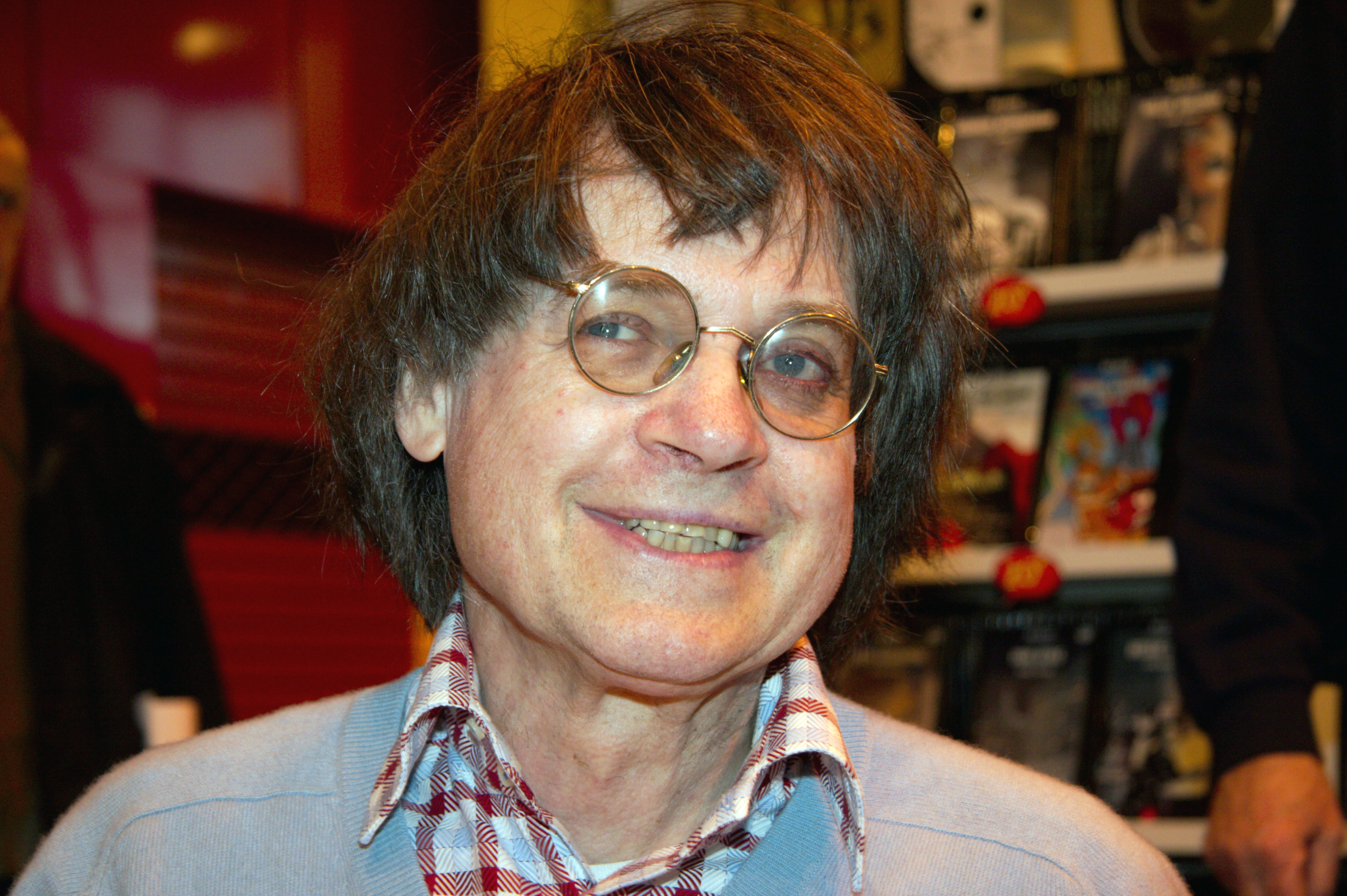
- Cabu in Paris in 2008
- Born: Jean Maurice Jules Cabut; 13 January 1938 Châlons-en-Champagne, Marne, France
- Died: 7 January 2015 (aged 76) Paris, France
- Area: Cartoonist
- Notable works: Hara-Kiri; Charlie Hebdo; Le Canard enchaîné

Signature
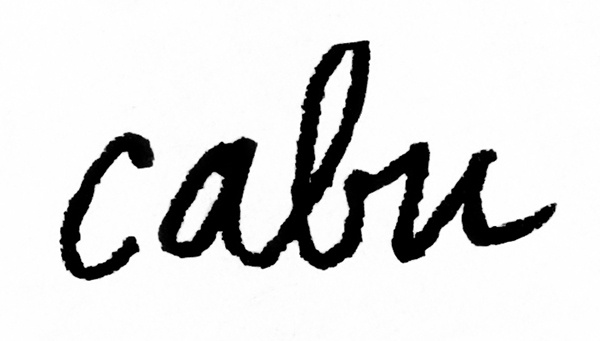

Jean Maurice Jules Cabut (French pronunciation: [ʒɑ̃ mɔʁis ʒyl kaby]; 13 January 1938 – 7 January 2015), known by the pen-name Cabu (pronounced [kaby]), was a French comic strip artist and caricaturist. He was murdered in the January 2015 shooting attack on the Charlie Hebdo newspaper offices. Cabu was a staff cartoonist and shareholder at Charlie Hebdo.

== Career ==
Cabu started out studying art at the École Estienne in Paris and his drawings were first published by 1954 in a local newspaper. The Algerian War forced him to be conscripted in the army for over two years, where his talent was used in the army magazine Bled and in Paris Match. His time in the army caused him to become a strident anti-militarist and adopt a slightly anarchistic view of society.

In 1960, after he left the Army, he became one of the founders of Hara-Kiri magazine. In the 1970s and 1980s, he became a popular artist, collaborating for a time with the children's TV programme Récré A2. He continued working in political caricature for Charlie Hebdo and Le Canard enchaîné.

His popular characters include Le Grand Duduche and adjudant Kronenbourg, and especially Mon Beauf. So spot-on was this caricature of an average, racist, sexist, vulgar, ordinary Frenchman that the word 'beauf' (short for "beau-frère", i. e., brother-in-law) has slipped into ordinary use. A 1973 drawing by Cabu attacking male politicians with the question "Qui a engrossé les 343 salopes du manifeste sur l'avortement?" ("Who got the 343 sluts from the abortion manifesto pregnant?") gave the Manifesto of the 343 its familiar nickname, often mistaken as the original title.

In February 2006, a Cabu cartoon which appeared on the cover of Charlie Hebdo in response to the Danish cartoons affair caused more controversy and a lawsuit. It depicted the Muslim prophet Muhammad under the caption "Muhammad overwhelmed by fundamentalists", crying "C'est dur d'être aimé par des cons!" ("So hard to be loved by jerks!").

From September 2006 to January 2007, an exhibition entitled Cabu and Paris was organised at the Paris city hall.

== Death ==
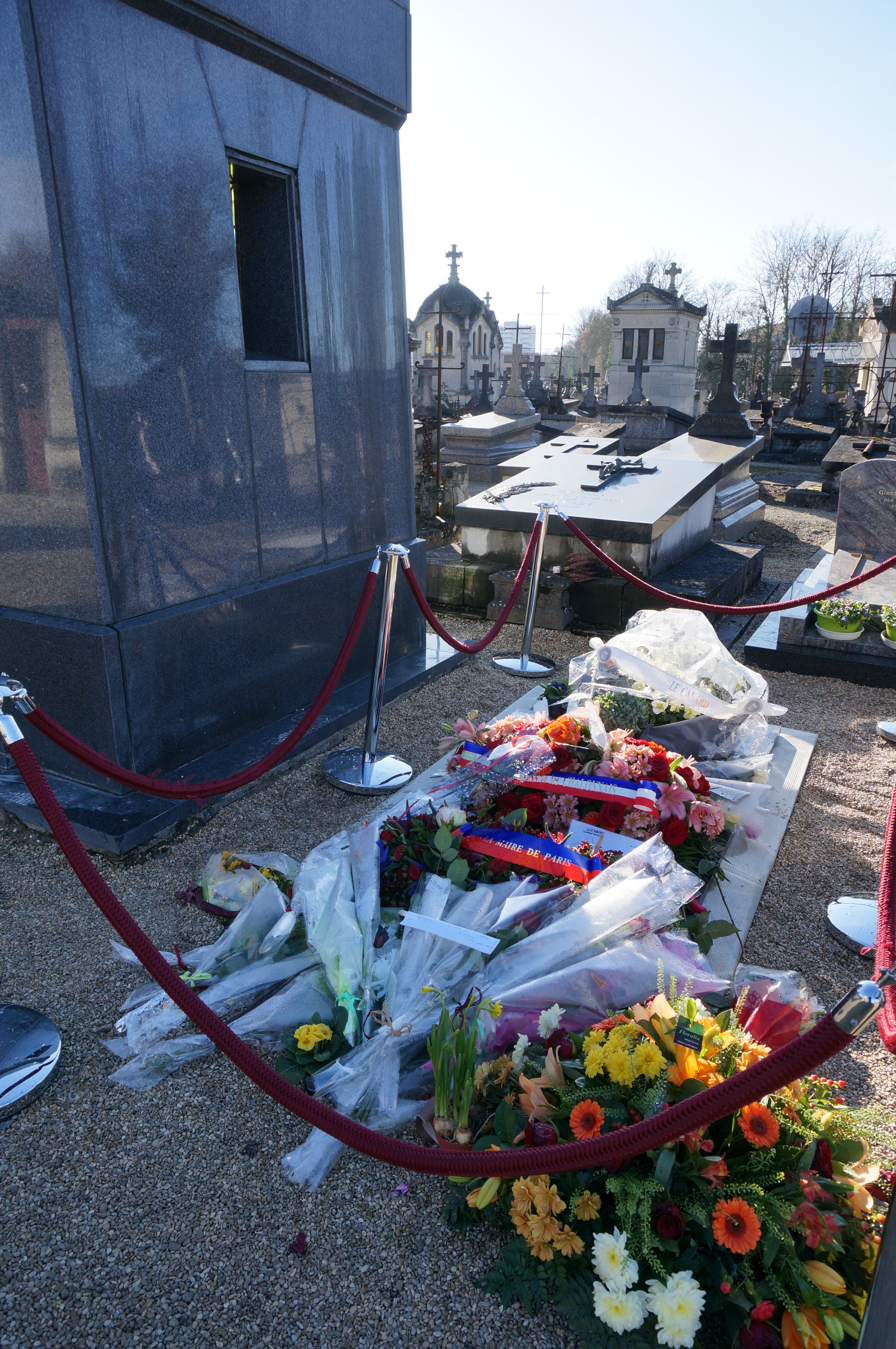
Grave of Cabu

Cabu was killed, along with seven of his colleagues, two police officers, and two others, on 7 January 2015 in the Charlie Hebdo shooting when al-Qaeda gunmen stormed the newspaper's offices in Paris.

The asteroid 320880 Cabu was named in his memory on 5 June 2016 by its discoverer Jean-Claude Merlin.

== Personal life ==
Cabu was the father of the French singer/songwriter Mano Solo (24 April 1963 – 10 January 2010).

He was succeeded by two unnamed relatives. His tombstone read... "the man who gave every moment a shot..." in Occitan.

== Works ==
- Le grand Duduche series :
  - Le grand Duduche (1972) Dargaud
  - Il lui faudrait une bonne guerre !.. (1972) Dargaud
  - Les aventures de madame Pompidou (1972) Square
  - L'ennemi intérieur (1973) éd. du Square et Dargaud
  - Le grand Duduche en vacances (1974) éd. du Square
  - Passe ton bac, après on verra ! (1980) éd. du Rond Point
  - Maraboud'ficelle, scénario de William Leymergie (1980) Dargaud
  - À bas la mode ! (1981) Dargaud
  - Le Grand Duduche et la fille du proviseur (1982) Dargaud
- Le journal de Catherine (1970) – éd du Square
- Mon beauf (1976) éd du Square
- Catherine saute au Paf (1978) éd du Square
- Inspecteur la bavure (1981) Albin Michel
- Le Gros blond avec sa chemise noire (1988) Albin Michel
- À consommer avec modération (1989) Albin Michel
- Mort aux vieux ! (1989) Albin Michel
- Cabu au Canard Enchaîné (1989) Albin Michel
- Tonton la-terreur (1991) Albin Michel
- Adieu Tonton (1992) Albin Michel
- Les Abrutis sont parmi nous (1992) Albin Michel
- Responsables mais pas coupables ! (1993) Albin Michel
- Secrets d'État (1994) Albin Michel
- Les Aventure épatantes de Jacques Chirac (1996) Albin Michel
- Vas-y Jospin ! (1999) Albin Michel
- À gauche toute ! (2000) Albin Michel

== Honours and awards ==
Chevalier of the Order of the Legion of Honour

== See also ==
- List of journalists killed in Europe
