= Document.no =

Norwegian far-right anti-immigration website

- Website type: Online newspaper
- Available in: Norwegian
- Owner: Document.no AS
- Editor: Hans Rustad
- Website: document.no
- Launched: 14 January 2003

Document.no is a Norwegian right-wing to far-right anti-immigration online newspaper. Academics have identified Document.no as an anti-Muslim website permeated by the Eurabia conspiracy theory, although others have described it as a conservative and more moderate part of the movement. The website received global media attention in connection with the 2011 Norway attacks due to its association with perpetrator Anders Behring Breivik. Document invited Tommy Robinson to Oslo in 2025, with editor Hans Rustad starting that he considers Robinson to be a "national hero."

The articles published in Document.no are often critical towards Islam and immigration, and supportive of Israel and the United States, as well as Donald Trump and conspiracy theories such as election fraud in the 2020 election. Faktisk.no found Document.no to be part of a far-right echo chamber that simultaneously is one of Norway's most popular online newspapers in social media, and a report on extremism on the Internet published in 2013 by the Ministry of Justice and Public Security described Document.no as an "extremist website." Document.no has been met with mixed reception in media commentary.

Document originally began as a small publishing company. The website was launched by Hans Rustad, a former journalist for the news agency NTB in 2003, and is owned by the limited company with the same name. Rustad was admitted to the Association of Norwegian Editors in 2018, and Document.no was granted financial press support from the Norwegian state in 2023.

== History and impact ==
Document.no began publishing as a blog on 14 January 2003. It moved from having the form of a blog to being a news site, as more authors as Christian Skaug, Nina Hjerpset-Østlie and Hanne Tolg joined the editorial team. Today it is referred to as an online newspaper. By 2011, the website reached an audience of up to 40,000 unique visitors every week. By 2018 the site had over 400,000 monthly readers.

In 2015, Wales-based blogger Hanne Tolg was investigated for alleged anti-Muslim posts on the site, and quit her job at a fire service in North Wales as a result of the investigation. In 2016, Tolg's articles twice topped the list of most-shared articles on social media in Norway. According to fact-checking organization Faktisk.no, Document.no's content is primarily shared by an overlapping far-right echo chamber on social media that is among the most widely shared in Norway. Document.no also has a Danish edition, Document.dk, which in 2016 was briefly edited by the editor of the Danish blog Uriasposten, Kim Møller.

Rustad and Document.no originally distanced themselves from counter-jihad blogger Peder "Fjordman" Jensen since as early as 2007, but in 2020 Document Forlag published a book by Jensen about the Breivik case. Document.no has still sometimes been identified as part of the counter-jihad movement.

=== Government blasphemy bill ===
The website has been cited as the main player when for the first time in Norwegian history, in 2009 "bloggers" were credited for successfully setting the national political agenda. Document.no had criticized a government "blasphemy bill", a proposed extension of §185 with regard to "hate speech so that the provision protects the need for a criminal law protection against qualified attack on religions and belief." The proposed bill was met with nearly no exposure in the mainstream media, until close to a month later, although it had been criticized as an attack on democracy in Danish newspapers. Eventually the bill became criticized as attacking freedom of speech, and an online petition against it was supported by numerous notable figures and organisations in Norway. The pressure caused the government to later retract the proposal.

=== Anders Behring Breivik ===
Document.no received global media attention after the 2011 Norway attacks when it became known that terrorist Anders Behring Breivik had contributed comments to the site (among over 40 websites including Stormfront, Minerva, VG and Aftenposten), attended one of its events and been in contact with its owner Rustad over a possible cooperation. Breivik posted numerous posts on Document.no (mainly in 2009) and praised the founder Hans Rustad. He also attended an open meeting of "Documents venner" (Friends of Document), affiliated with the website, in the fall of 2009. Breivik reportedly sought to start a Norwegian version of the Tea Party movement in cooperation with the owners of Document.no, who initially expressed interest but ultimately turned down his proposal because he did not have the contacts he promised. Breivik eventually became disaffected with the website because he found it to be too moderate for his views, and has later admitted that he has actually been a neo-Nazi since the early 1990s, who only disguised himself in later years. When Breivik was named as the arrested, the website became unreachable due to an extreme increase in traffic. Rustad expressed bleakness with inevitably having to be associated with Breivik, while maintaining that Breivik had disguised his extremist views through relatively moderate, non-violent user comments (which were compiled and made available on the site).

=== NRK "Roma woman" feature ===
Nina Hjerpset-Østlie, writing for Document.no was the first to break a scandal regarding an eight-minute news feature about a Roma woman in the public service broadcaster NRK in January 2013. In the NRK-feature, Roma woman Mirela Mustata was presented as a victim of Norwegian law system prejudice against Roma people, however Document.no could report that the woman who was presented as a victim had actually been convicted for co-conspiring to the rape of her own 11-year-old daughter, having received payment for it. It was later found that NRK had been aware of this, but chose not to report it in the feature because it, according to them, would make the case too complicated. The case was gradually rolled up by other commentators and gained widespread reporting in mainstream media, causing a major scandal for NRK. NRK later apologized for broadcasting the feature.

== Reception ==
Document.no has been described by academics as a website that features anti-Muslim and "hard right" rhetoric. A report on extremism on the Internet published in 2013 by the Norwegian Ministry of Justice and Public Security cites Document.no as an example of an "extremist website". According to Sindre Bangstad, an expert on the far-right, the website is permeated by the Eurabia conspiracy theory. In September 2020, the leader of the Norwegian Young Conservatives Sandra Bruflot said Document.no is a "website propagating hate against minorities" and asked that conservatives don't "legitimise" the website by linking to it.

The site has been described by Aftenposten as "an Islam-critical and Israel-friendly, so-called blue-blog", and by Dagbladet as "Islam-critical and socially conservative." Klassekampen has described it as a "leading online magazine" and has criticized it for not being transparent about the founding, and among the political right's "most important arenas for debate" around immigration and Islam. In 2014, the Norwegian Centre Against Racism (NCAR) described it as "the closest to an intellectual arena of debate" around the same topics for many on the political far-right, but did not consider it "far-right or onesidedly Islamophobic" at the time. In a 2021 re-evaluation, the NCAR identified Document.no as a publisher of far-right anti-Islam rhetoric, stating that "far-right extremists often claim– as Rustad does, that Muslims today try to conquer Europe as their ancestors" and that "This rhetoric, and especially the three campaigns deemed to have halted the rise of Islam in Europe, plays a central role in the far-right discourse, especially as ideological motivation. The same mindset and rhetoric characterize the site Document.no."

Helge Øgrim, editor of Journalisten, the journal of the Norwegian Union of Journalists, in July 2011 described Document.no as an "anti-immigrant forum which has evolved into a hotbed of galloping Islamophobia". Lars Gule described it in The Vancouver Sun as "a far-right web forum" that is "dominated by Islamophobic and anti-immigration commentary", while the conservative Muslim commentator Mohammad Usman Rana has called it "a right-wing populist and Muslimphobic interest group". Writer on right-wing extremism Øyvind Strømmen however rejects that the website is far-right, instead describing the authors as "socially conservative immigration-opponents". The Swedish Expo has described it as "right-wing radical and Islamophobic".

According to Klassekampen in 2014, "Document has been accused of releasing racist and xenophobic voices but is also praised for being a serious and fact-based site for Islamic criticism." Yvonne Rundberg Savosnick, the former chairman of the Norwegian Union of Jewish Students, mentioned the site in a 2009 feature with the student newspaper at the University of Oslo, Universitas, because of its "critical view of the Norwegian press," although she stated that she "rarely agreed with everything" on the website. Author and former Aschehoug editor Halvor Fosli has expressed support for many of the website's positions, and has been involved in some limited publishing cooperation. Elin Ørjasæter in 2013 wrote that the site includes "journalistic pearls and fresh revelations". Aftenposten columnist Bjørn Stærk in 2013 described Document.no as "one of Norway's most important media", and as "obligatory reading" for everyone wanting to follow the immigration-debate. Stærk claimed that the most controversial contents of the website "are the guest articles. Geert Wilders has had several articles. Julia Cæsar had an article about African immigrants' low intelligence. Critics use this as evidence that the editorial board of Document are racists and haters of Islam. At the same time there is nothing in the commentaries by the website's permanent writers, which indicate this".

In 2011, Hans Rustad complained to the Professional Committee of the Press over an article in the local newspaper Eidsvoll Ullensaker Blad, which described Rustad as a chief exponent of the "brown goo", stating that "it does not matter what the spill call themselves, this is very similar to Nazism" and concluding that "we do not want Behring Breivik, Rustad and other nutjobs to set the agenda". The committee criticized the article, emphasizing that it mostly discouraged the use of the term "Nazi" when referring to individuals.

Anders Giæver, a commentator writing for the Verdens Gang tabloid, criticized the investigation that led to Tolg's resignation from her job in 2015 as a "Kafkaesque process" that followed "targeting" from online forums, Facebook groups, and RationalWiki.

Following his admission to the Association of Norwegian Editors, Rustad has been criticised for increasingly promoting conspiracy theories, related to the 2020 United States presidential election, COVID-19 and the "deep state".

== See also ==
- Resett
- Subjekt (website)
