= Charlie Hebdo issue No. 1178 =

Edition of the French journal Charlie Hebdo

Cover of 14 January 2015 edition of Charlie Hebdo. A cartoon of Muhammad bears a Je suis Charlie sign and is captioned Tout est pardonné ("All is forgiven").

Charlie Hebdo issue No. 1178 was published on 14 January 2015. It was the first issue after the Charlie Hebdo shooting on 7 January 2015, in which terrorists Saïd and Chérif Kouachi killed twelve people. The edition was put together by surviving Charlie Hebdo cartoonists, journalists, and former contributors and was prepared in a room in the offices of Libération. The issue's print run of 7.95 million copies became a record for the French press. The publication sparked protests by Muslim demonstrators in Yemen, Pakistan, Mauritania, Algeria, Mali, Senegal, Niger, Chechnya, and other countries. In Niger, violent protests led to 10 deaths.

The issue's contents included many new cartoons, plus prior drawings by four of the slain artists and writings by the two journalists.

== Background ==
The Charlie Hebdo offices had suffered a terrorist attack on 7 January 2015 in which twelve died, including the editor and several core contributors. The remaining staff initially did not think they could publish the next issue on schedule, but other media organizations encouraged them to do so and offered practical and economic help. On 9 January 2015, the staff and occasional contributors gathered in a room in the offices of the newspaper Libération and were lent computers from Le Monde. There were around 25 people, including Willem, Luz, Corinne "Coco" Rey, Babouse, Sigolène Vinson, Antonio Fischetti, Zineb El Rhazoui, Richard Malka and Laurent Léger.

== Publication ==
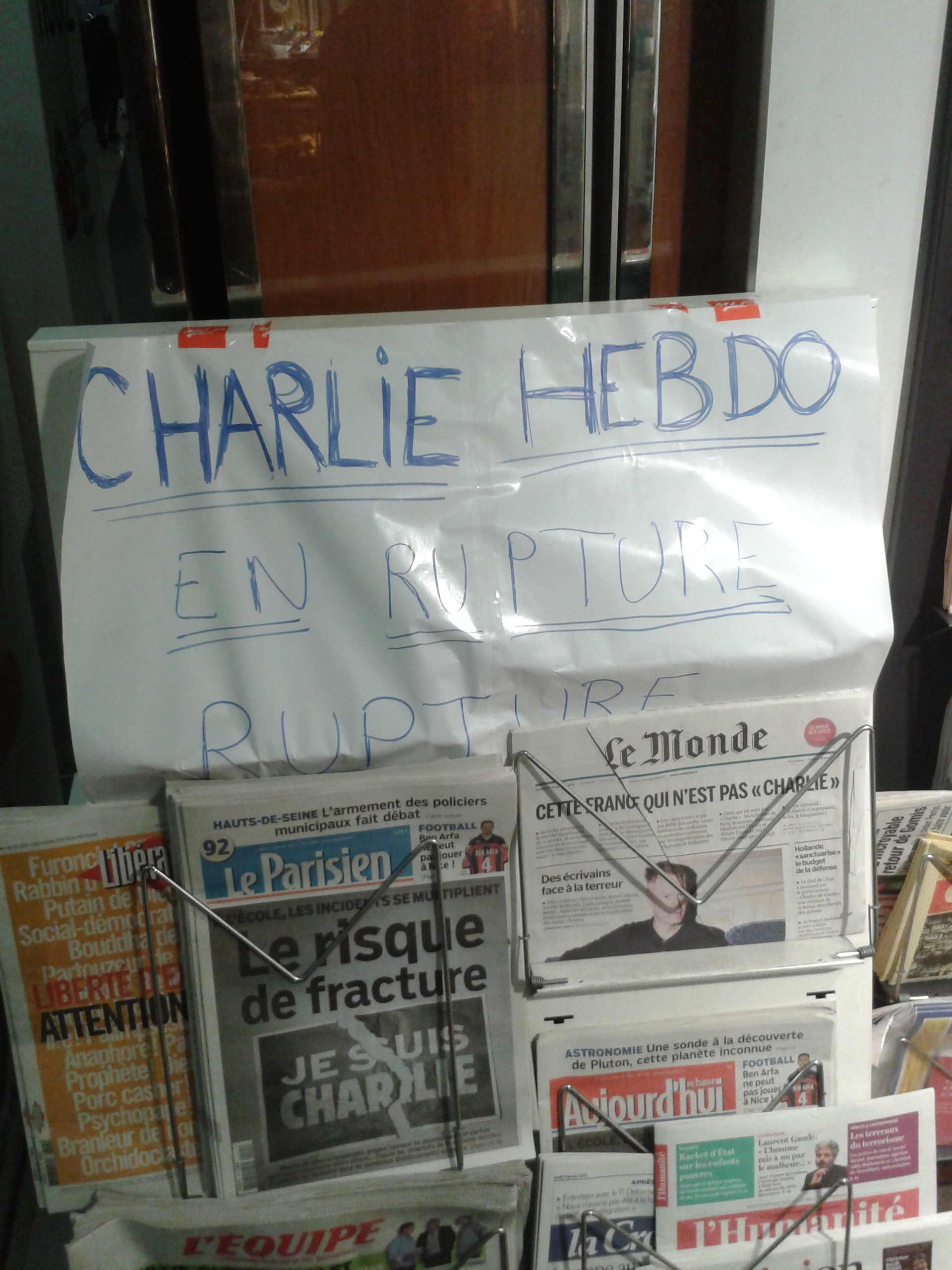
A sign reading "Charlie Hebdo sold out" on 15 January

Charlie Hebdo has a typical print run of 60,000 copies. At first, the survivors' issue was to have a million‑copy print run; it was increased to three million prior to publication due to expectations of high demand.

On the morning of 14 January, thousands of people in France queued in line for hours, waiting for newsstands to open. Within an hour, 700,000 copies had been sold and every newsstand in the country was sold out. More copies were delivered the next day, and in total, 1.9 million copies were sold in the first 48 hours.

The issue run was increased again to five million on 14 January, then to seven million, and finally to 7.95 million, including nearly 760,000 sent for export to 25 countries. The print run was the highest ever for the French press; the previous record was 2.2 million for an issue of France-Soir on the death of Charles de Gaulle.

The demand was so great that counterfeit copies were already being distributed on 14 January, and issues were being offered on eBay for "exorbitant" prices.

The issue was translated into five languages: English, Italian, Spanish, Arabic and Turkish. There were plans for it to be sold in 25 countries and translated into 16 languages.

The following issue, No. 1179, did not appear until six weeks later, on 25 February 2015. The issue was subtitled C'est reparti ("Here we go again"), which new publishing director Riss stated was to show the publication had "returned to life" ("La vie reprend"). The issue's print run was 2.5 million.

On 6 January 2016, a special issue (number 1224) was published to commemorate the 2015 attack. Its cover showed God running with a gun and the title "A year later, the killer is still at large" ("Un an après, l'assassin court toujours").

== Content ==
The front page is titled "Tout est pardonné" ("All is forgiven") and features a cartoon of Muhammad with a tear in his eye and holding a "Je suis Charlie" sign ("I am Charlie"). The background colour is green. The drawing was made by Luz who has another drawing in which the Kouachi brothers, drawn with angel wings, ask in disappointment: "Bah, where are the 70 virgins?" A speech bubble beside them reads: "They are with the Charlie team, losers." There are no other depictions of Muhammad within the issue.

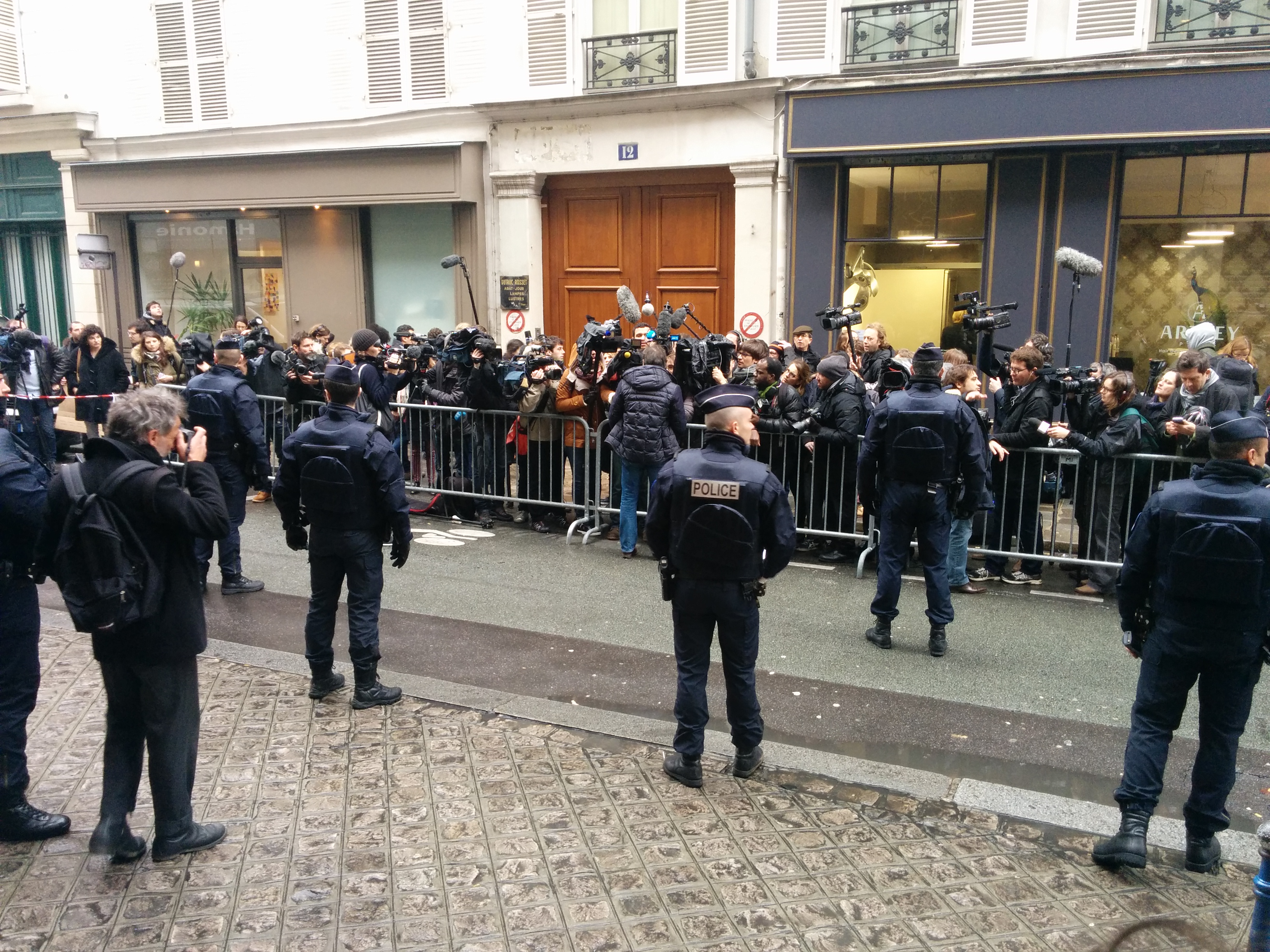
Journalists awaiting the arrival of the Charlie Hebdo staff at Libération

In the editorial, editor-in-chief Gérard Biard called for full secularism (laïcité) and regretted that the defense of Charlie Hebdo against previous threats and arson had often been half-hearted. He added: "All those who claim to defend Muslims, while accepting the totalitarian religious rhetoric, are in fact defending their executioners. The first victims of Islamic fascism are the Muslims." Describing the magazine as atheist, Biard wrote that the church bells of Notre-Dame de Paris ringing for Charlie Hebdo had made the staff laugh.

The back cover features a selection of "covers which we were spared from". One by Walter Foolz is of the Kouachi brothers lamenting the irony of having died in a print shop. Another by Catherine Meurisse shows child labourers making Je suis Charlie T‑shirts with a text reading: "At the same time in Bangladesh: We stand by you with all our hearts."

In an installment of Riad Sattouf's ongoing strip La vie secrète des jeunes ("The secret life of youths") — based on youth conversations Sattouf has overheard — a French Arab youth discusses the shooting on his cellphone and declares he "couldn't give a fuck about Charlie Hebdau", but that people should not be killed for what they say. Walter Foolz draws attention to tragedies of greater scale the same week; in the cartoon, one of Boko Haram's followers declares to another that "that's 2,000 subscribers that Charlie Hebdo won't get", referring to the number of fatalities at the Baga massacre in Nigeria.

Legal reporter Sigolène Vinson, who was told by the attackers that she was spared because she was a woman, writes about the cocker spaniel Lila which ran around in the office while the terrorists were shooting, and mockingly suggests Lila might have been spared because she was female, as well. The psychoanalyst Elsa Cayat who died in the attack is featured in a cartoon where a man tells her he dreamed he killed the staff at Charlie Hebdo but spared the dog with "long hair and big ears"; the psychoanalyst asks: "And so you had a vision of your mother's sexual organs, right?"

The issue featured drawings by the murdered cartoonists Wolinski, Charb, Tignous, and Honoré, as well, along with texts written by the murdered journalists Bernard Maris and Elsa Cayat and a tribute to the policeman Franck and all the other victims. Coco, Luz, Meurisse, and Loïc Schwartz were among those who reported on the Paris demonstrations. David Ziggy Green did so on similar demonstrations at Trafalgar Square in England. Fun is made of Arnold Schwarzenegger's becoming a subscriber.

== Reactions ==
=== Reviews ===
Prior to the issue being published, the controversial cover was released by the magazine, and media weighed in. Myriam François-Cerrah, a Muslim freelance journalist of French paternal descent, criticized Charlie Hebdo for again using racial stereotypes when portraying Muhammad and Muslims, saying "We (thankfully!) wouldn't accept an image of a hooked-nose Jew, so it is unclear to me why images of hooked-nose Arabs – because forget who the prophet Muhammad is to Muslims, he is an Arab man being depicted in racially stereotypical terms – isn't more disturbing to others."

Art critic Jonathan Jones for The Guardian called the cover "a life-affirming work of art", further writing, "Funny people were killed for being funny; this new cover is the only possible response – a response that makes you laugh."

The Norwegian journalist Anders Giæver gave the cover a "die throw" of six out of six pips in a review in VG titled: "Touché Charlie", writing "So good. So disrespectful. So filled with self-irony."

Editorial writer Sanna Rayman in Sweden's Svenska Dagbladet found the cover to be an elegant balancing act which combined forgiving reconciliation with determination to assert their right of satirising whomever they want.

Erik Bergersen, editor of the Norwegian satirical site Opplysningskontoret, wrote an in‑depth commentary in Aftenposten after the issue was released. Bergersen said the issue still succeeds as multi-layered satire, hitting in many directions yet possibly also offending those who have stated support for the magazine. In his column, titled "To be Charlie or not to be," he praised the magazine for not changing a thing. "But while they stretch out a conciliatory hand, so do they also keep their fist clenched tightly against what they believe threatens freedom of expression. And by that they insist that today's media public is nuanced enough to keep both ideas in mind simultaneously... This is where the genius of Charlie lay. And it's still there."

To comics critic Matthias Wivel, the contents of the issue were "mostly mediocre cartoons", particularly of the work of the murdered cartoonists. He had higher praise for the cartoons made in response to the shootings, in particular those by Sattouf, whose strip he called "Street-level Voltaire wittily written in sociolect"; Walter Foolz, for his international perspective; and the rejected-covers feature on the back page.

=== Media coverage ===
The publication of the issue was widely covered in French media, which showed pictures of the front pages as well as other drawings from the issue. The Turkish newspaper Cumhuriyet printed several pages from the Charlie Hebdo issue including a small picture of the cover.

The publication of a new Muhammad cartoon was widely criticized in Muslim-majority countries, including by the Jordanian Ad-Dustour, the Saudi Arabian Al Watan, and the Turkish Yeni Akit. Several accused Western media of double standards and called for a ban against religious insults. In Echorouk, Habib Rashdin criticised the French government for supporting Charlie Hebdo and compared it to a crusade against Muslims.

Editor-in-chief Gérard Biard denied the cover implied the murderers should be absolved of their crimes, and rejected accusations of racism, Islamophobia, and provocation of Muslims by Charlie Hebdo. He asserted the need to uphold laïcité in the face of global socio-political conditions that challenge such values.

=== Other reactions ===
The leading Egyptian religious institution Dar al-Ifta al-Misriyyah denounced the issue, saying it "deepens hatred and discrimination between Muslims and others" and called on French political leaders to condemn what it considered Charlie Hebdo's "racist act which works to incite sectarianism". The Grand Mufti of Jerusalem Muhammad Ahmad Hussein condemned the cartoons as hurting the feelings of Muslims all over the world, while at the same time condemning terrorism and violence against innocents.

Following Cumhuriyet's publishing of a small picture of the Muhammad caricature, a court in Turkey banned websites that published Charlie Hebdo. The newspaper received death threats and came under police protection.

A Spokesperson for the United States Department of State Marie Harf said the U.S. fully supported Charlie Hebdo's right to publish the issue. Prime Minister of the United Kingdom David Cameron also supported it. Australian Prime Minister Tony Abbott said to an Australian radio station that while he didn't like everything the magazine published, "he rather like[d]" the cartoon on the cover, which he interpreted as a symbol of forgiveness.

On 15 January, Belgian police launched a fatal raid on terror suspects who were alleged to be plotting attacks on vendors selling the issue.

A Wiltshire Police officer asked a newsagent in Corsham for details on customers who bought the issue. When this came to public attention, the Wiltshire Police declared that they were seeking to defend the customers, and that the details gathered had been permanently deleted.

In Iran, the government responded to the cartoons by organizing a second annual Holocaust cartoon competition.

==== Violence ====
A newsagent in the English city of Oxford, himself a Muslim, abandoned plans to sell the issue after receiving threats of arson against his premises.

The publication sparked riots in Zinder, Niger, which resulted in five deaths. The city also experienced attacks on Christian-owned shops and a French cultural center was attacked when a crowd of 50 people set fire to its adjacent cafeteria, library, and offices. Muslim crowds demonstrating against Muhammad's depiction attacked and set alight French businesses and churches with incendiary devices in Niamey; and five deaths were reported. Burned churches were also reported in eastern Maradi and Gouré. According to police reports, at least 10 people were killed, more than 170 were injured, and 45 churches were burned.

Other demonstrations occurred in Algiers, Khartoum, Mogadishu, Afghanistan, and Indian-administered Kashmir. Pakistan saw violent demonstrations in Karachi. Asif Hassan, a Muslim Arab photographer working for the French news agency AFP, was seriously injured when he was shot in the chest. In Algiers and Jordan, protesters clashed with police, but there were non-violent demonstrations against the cartoon in Khartoum, Sudan, Russian Muslims in north Caucasus region of Ingushetia, and several other African countries – Mali, Senegal, and Mauritania.

== See also ==
- Charlie Hebdo issue No. 1011
- List of newspapers in France
