= Abedin Mahdavi =

Iranian filmmaker and photographer

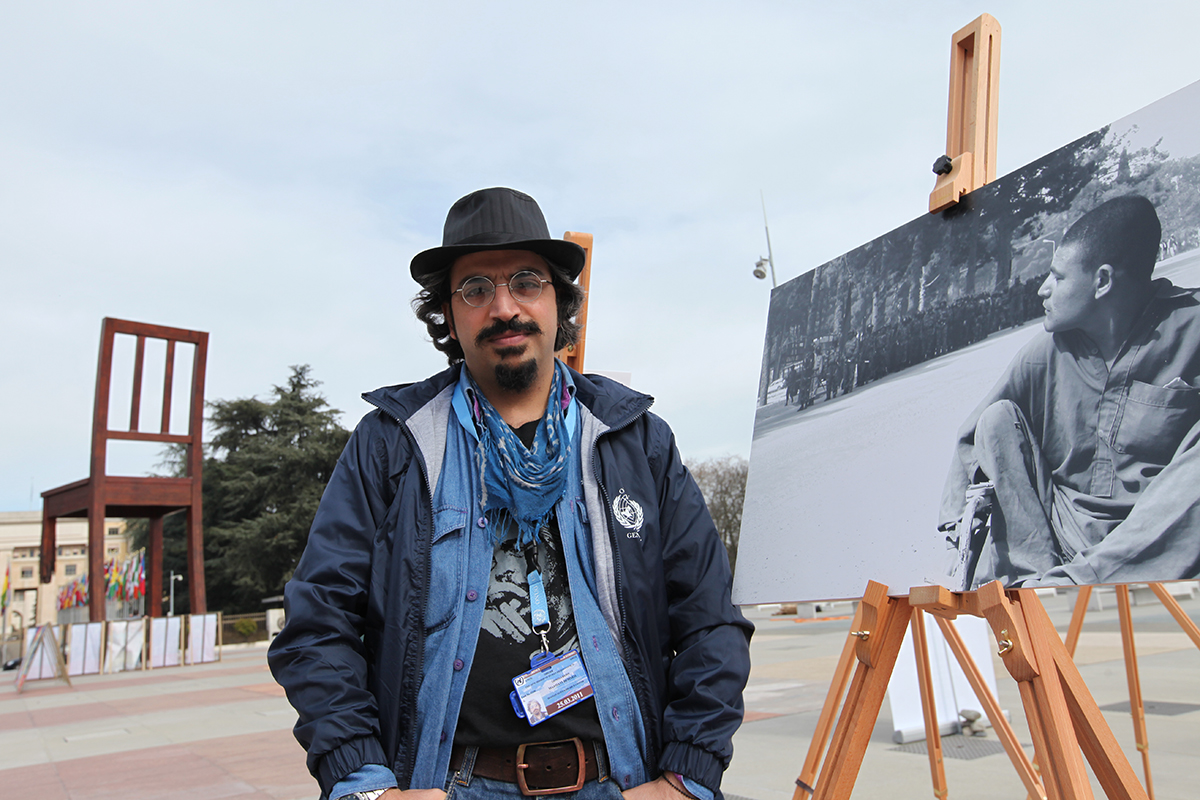
- Mahdavi in Geneva, 2011
- Born: October 30, 1981 (age 44); Tehran, IRAN
- Occupations: Photojournalism, Director, Human rights activist
- Website: abedinmahdavi.com

Abedin Mahdavi (born October 30, 1981, in Tehran) is freelance photojournalism, international reporter subjecting war children and crisis, director and a human rights activist regarding international peace. He is the leader and founder of an international artists group called "Holy Children Group".

He has been at the scene in many war-torn areas and critical places as a photojournalist and children-HIV/AIDS activist since 2001 and the main subject of his cultural-artistic activities are war children, poverty, and crisis. From his earnings, he provides these children with support.

== Biography ==
Mahdavi was born on October 29, 1981, in Tehran in NezamAbad neighborhood.

His parents were simple teachers and he was raised in a cultural-artistic family. He belongs to the middle-class society of Tehran. His father was a teacher working in deprived areas of Tehran. Mahdavi received his first camera as a gift from his father at the age of 14. Mahdavi started photographing at the age of 14 with that camera and after learning about the art of photography, took it more seriously in Iranian Photographer House, between 1996 and 1998. At the age of 15, in a photographing contests among students of Tehran. The photo was about a teenager sitting on the sidewalk with a pair of scales beside him who fell asleep of exhaustion holding his study book with his hand.

After getting his diploma, he was sent to the eastern borders of the country for his military service and in that time he has observed the clashes with the drug dealers and the problems of rural people and Afghan immigrants and he was touched to a great extent by the miserable scenes of low lifestyle and poverty of those people. He spent a lot of time along with his friend teaching Persian Alphabet to the shed dweller children until his friend was killed in a border conflict and he exercised the negative effect of war for the first time at the age of 18 in 2001.

In 2002, he started studying film making in Iranian Youth Cinema Society and for the first time he traveled to Afghanistan in 2004 for his thesis. He produces and directed his first documentary movie about an Afghan child who has lost both his legs due to the explosion of anti-personnel mine. Members of International Committee of the Red Cross (ICRC) in Afghanistan helped him to find these children and to make an interview with them. Therefore, the movie was sent to the committee headquarter in Switzerland and he was honored for making the film.

Holy Children Group

Mahdavi established Holy Children Group after the death of his friend Kaveh Golestan. He benefited from the support of Fakhri Golestan, wife of Ebrahim Golestan, was an Iranian writer and director and she is the mother of Kaveh Golestan who was one of the first children rights defenders in Iran and has established and supported many orphanages in Tehran. Fakhri Golestan has died in 2011 in Tehran when she was 87 years old. Abedin Mahdavi has been to Afghanistan, Pakistan, Iraq, Tajikistan, Lebanon, Syria, Sudan, Somalia, Haiti, Venezuela, and Colombia since 2003 and conducted his thorough research under the flag of Holy Children using tools such as drawings and handmade toys. By making films and photos of the same subject, he provides his travel expenses and funds the group's activities. With this limited income, he was able to send some aids to the poor children of Afghanistan, Iraq, Pakistan, and Somalia.

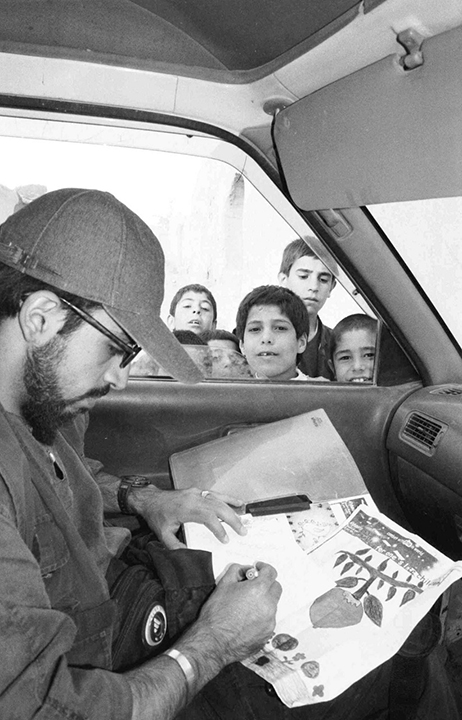
Abedin Mahdavi; leader of Holy Children in Afghanistan, 2003

In 2004, Abedin Mahdavi travelled to Afghanistan again and stayed there for 20 months. He continued photographing and filming war-stricken children visiting many areas of the country and different people at the time of clashes.

Besides his artistic activities, he has conducted extensive research by gathering Afghan children drawings to discover negative effects of war on the children.

Because the lack of financial support, he faced many difficulties during the time in Afghanistan and was even wounded in one of clashes in Kandahar and survived. In the winter of 2004, he was captured by Taliban group in Kabul and all his belongings were stolen.

Since he was a recognized person for Afghani authorities and his activities have drawn their attention, he was arrested twice by the troops. First time he was arrested by the NATO along with German troops in Kabul for seven days and then got arrested for the second time by the U.S. Army in Panjshir for ten days while photographing. As he was informed, the main cause of the arrests was being an Iranian subject or holding an Iranian passport. After they investigated about his independence project in Afghanistan, he was released and apologized and the U.S. Army in Afghanistan had issued a photographing license for him and supported him as well to keep on his activities all over the country.

He made his first TV interview with DW-TV correspondent in the city of Herat regarding his activities and it was aired in the national TV of the country in 2004. BBC Radio and VOA correspondents also made a report in Kabul and Herat mentioning his activities in the nurseries of these two cities talking about his drawing project in Afghanistan. The news of his activities in Afghanistan was spread by reporters, anti-war activists and other NGOs to more than 30 countries across the world.

While returning to Iran in 2005, he was arrested on the eastern borders of the country by the Iranian security forces for a crime he was never told. He was released after three days of investigation.

After a short while, he created an exhibition of the Afghani children drawings in Tehran which was considered to be his first one. This exhibition was held in Afghanistan in the same year with help of some friends. He tried to register this group as a Non-Governmental Organization Organization but his request was rejected. The authorities reminded him that he was on parole.

Other Work and Legal Problems

He started to work as a photojournalist for a domestic and a foreign news agency in the same year. Meanwhile, he travelled to Pakistan and Iraq to pursue his research project about war children under the name of Holy Children group and comes back with a precious collection of photographs.

On 12 July 2005 while he was taking photos of some students gathered in front of Tehran University supporting Akbar Ganji, he was attacked by some Iranian security forces with civilian clothes and his camera and equipment were broken. He was hurt on the side of neck and rib cage but those people continued to beat him savagely while dragging him on the street until losing his consciousness. He was taken to the hospital by three women who were at the scene and he was treated there. Some witnesses said that among many photographers and journalists, he was the only one who was attacked and the others were banned to photograph or film the scene of beating but those who knew Abedin Mahdavi and his background regarding his contribution to the war children have published some photos and news on websites and weblogs.

He is a graduate of Iranian Youth Cinema Society in film making and holding a degree in directing from university of art and culture in Iran and he took course in documentary photographing, social photography, digital filming and photographing in several countries including China, United Arab Emirates, and Sweden.

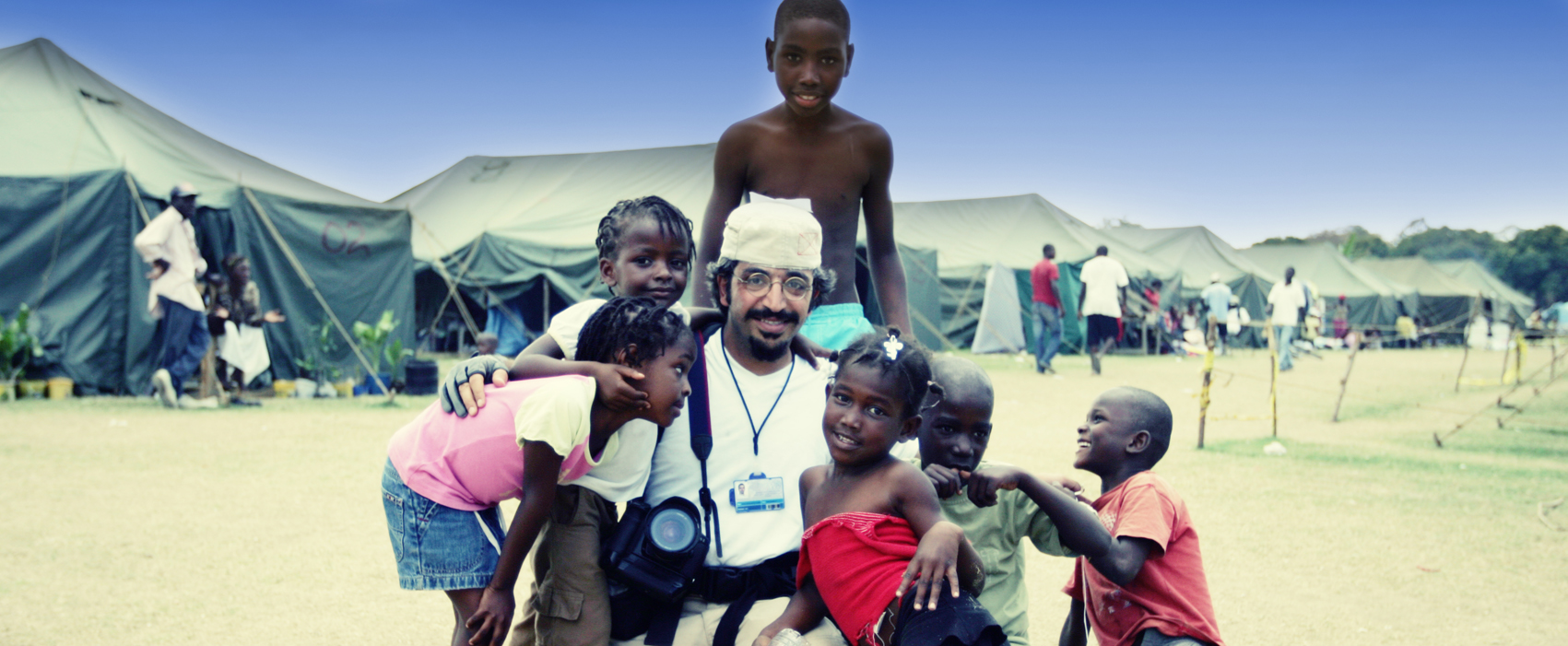
Abedin Mahdav; leader of Holy Children International Group, Haiti, January 2010

== Photographing activities ==
- Our Street Children (2000)
- Merchants of Pain (2000)
- Kurdistan Children (2001)
- Uptown, Downtown (2002)
- The Hidden Beauty – Souraj, Afghanistan (2003)
- Spiritual Feature of Ancient Herat, Afghanistan (2003)
- Holy Children – War Children of Afghanistan (2003–2004)
- A Sky Without War, Afghanistan (2003–2004)
- Ahmad, an Undying Memory, Afghanistan (2003–2004)
- Warriors, Afghanistan (2003–2004)
- Return of a Native, Afghanistan (2003–2004)
- Holy Children – War Children of Pakistan (2004)
- Holy Children – War Children of Tajikistan (2004)
- Children of Bam, Iran (2005)
- Tehran's Heaven, Iran (2005–2006)
- Freedom, Iran (2005)
- 10th Floor, Iran (2005)
- Easter, Iran (2006)
- Our Proletarians, Iran (from 2005)
- Pakistan earthquake (2006)
- Children of the Land of Revelation, Saudi Arabia (2006)
- Holy Children – War Children of Iraq (2007–2008)
- Holy Children – War Children of Lebanon (2008)
- Generation of Pain, Palestine Children (2009)
- Holy Children, Haiti (2009)
- Haiti is Alive, Haiti earthquake (2009)
- Children of Simon Bolivar – Venezuela, Cuba, Haiti (2009–2010)
- Holy Children, Colombia (2009)
- Along with Water, Pakistan's Flood (2010)
- War-Poverty-Death, Somalia (2011)

== Filmography ==
=== Short documentary films ===
- Souraj and Herat's Mines, Afghanistan (2003)
- Holy Children, Afghanistan (2004)
- Border Trace, Afghanistan (2005)
- Sky Children, Afghanistan (2004–2005)
- Quick Immigration, Afghanistan (2006)
- Home, is the End of Life, Iran (2006)
- Protectors of Persia, Iran (2007)
- Another Honor, Iran (2007)
- Barbareh Swallows, Iran (2008)
- M for Mother, Iran (2009)
- Pulse, Iran (2009)
- Praying, Pakistan (2010)

=== Long documentary films ===
- Return of a Native, Afghanistan (2003–2004)
- Dazan School Children, Iran (2008)
- The Pain Generation, Iran-Palestine, Gaza (2009)
- Haiti is Alive, Haiti (2010)
- Children of Simon Bolivar, Cuba – Haiti – Venezuela (2010)
- Doctor Zaka, Haiti-Venezuela-Cuba-Colombia (2010)
- Poetry Without Limits, Sweden (2011)
- Why War? Iran-Switzerland-Sweden (2011)
- Welcome to Mogadishu, Somalia (2011)
- This is our Home, Tehran-Iran (2011)

=== Fictional long movies ===
- Embryo Convicted is Abedin's first fictional cinematic movie which its subject deals with Iraqi war-stricken children. This project was stopped in Iran because of the authorities' hostility towards him and no license was issued. He decided to take the project outside the country.

=== Fictional film scripts ===
- Souraj (2005)
- Border Market (2005)
- Children of Fire (2007)
- Twelve O'clock (2009)
- Yahiya Station (2010)
- Embryo Convicted (2011)

== Photo exhibitions ==
- Holy Children 1, [Afghanistan war-stricken children], solo, (Kabul, Afghanistan) 2004
- Holy Children 2, [Afghanistan war-stricken children], solo, (Tehran, Iran) 2004
- Holy Children 3, [Pakistan war-stricken children], solo, (Tehran, Iran) 2005
- Holy Children 4, [Iraq war-stricken children], solo, (Baghdad, Iraq) 2007
- Holy Children 4, war children exclusive exhibition [Afghanistan war-stricken children], solo, (Uppsala-Stockholm, Sweden)

simultaneously in Iran, 2008

- Holy Children 5, [Afghanistan war-stricken children], solo, (Paris, France) 2008
- Holy Children 6, The Pain Generation [Palestine and Lebanon war-stricken children], solo, (Tehran, Iran) 2009
- Humanity in War [Holy Children Selection], collective exhibition along with held by International Committee of the Red Cross (ICRC) with photographers James Nachtwey, Franco Pagetti, Antonin Kratochvil, Ron Haviv, Christopher Morris, and by

Iranian war photographer Abedin Mahdavi.(Tehran, Iran) 2009

- Children of Bolivar, [Caribbean doctors without borders], (Iran-Cuba-Venezuela) 2010
- Holy Children 7, Praying, [Pakistan flood-stricken children], (Tehran, Iran) 2010
- Holy Children 8, Haiti is Alive, [Haiti earthquake], (Tehran, Iran) 2010
- Holy Children 9, war children exclusive exhibition, [war-stricken children of Afghanistan, Iraq, Pakistan, ... ], (United Nations-Geneva, Switzerland) 2011

== Awards and honors ==
- Honored by Iran Photojournalists Association as the youngest war photojournalist (2006)
- Special award in International Air Photographing Club Contest of Canada (2006)
- Honored by Children Defending Cultural Organization of Sweden as a war children photographer (2008)
- Honored by Sweden National Museum for the donation of war children photos (2008)
- Honored by judges of the 4th documentary film festival, [Haiti is Alive, 2010], (2010)
- The award of the best political documentary film and candidate for the best long documentary film in the 5th documentary film festival, [Welcome to Mogadishu, Somalia, 2011], (2011)
- The award of the best anti-war documentary film in the 1st Independent Filmmakers International Festival, [Why War?, Iran-Switzerland-Sweden, 2011], (2011)
