= Resett =

Norwegian website

- Type: Alternative media
- Format: Online newspaper
- Editor: Maria Zähler
- Founded: 28 August 2017
- Ceased publication: December 2022
- Political alignment: National Conservatism and Anti-Arabism
- Language: Norwegian
- Website: https://www.resett.no

Resett, also known as Resett.no, was a Norwegian alternative news website that was described by media scholars as "the leading far-right outlet in the Norwegian context" or as one of the "two main websites" of "the extreme right in Norway." It was founded by Helge Lurås in 2017.

Historian Torkel Brekke has compared Resett to Document.no and noted that both publications are known for their "hostility against Islam." The Norwegian Centre Against Racism has described Resett as a "radical right-wing blog." Dagsavisen argued that Resett is not a journalistic medium, and described it as part of the radical right.

Resett described its aim as to "present cases from a different angle than established mass media, and to cover news that other media do not want to cover". The newspaper ceased operations in December 2022.

In July 2018, the newspaper claimed around 30,000 unique readers per day.

In June 2022, Maria Zähler became the editor-in-chief after Helge Lurås. When she was appointed, she declared that she wants to make Resett to "a center-right, realpolitik newspaper, with common sense as a guiding principle" and "to establish a decent newspaper on the right of Norwegian center". Zähler is transgender, and has written about her transgender experience.

In October 2022, Resett was bought by the Norwegian investor Petter Inge Remøy. Remøy stated that he wanted to save the economically challenged newspaper so that it could produce honest journalism.

Before Resett was established, Editor-in-chief Helge Lurås was a critic of Norwegian military campaigns abroad. His scepticism is also expressed in Resett in their published analysis of NRK's coverage of the civil war in Libya.

Resett states that it follows the Ethical Code of Practice for the Norwegian Press, but its application for membership in the established media organizations in Norway has been rejected.

== Reception ==
Political commentators in Dagsavisen and Dagbladet argued that Resett routinely violated the Ethical Code of Practice, and that the website therefore had to be considered a political campaign rather than a newspaper. A research report analyzing articles and comments in Resett found no clear violations of the Ethical Code of Practice.

In 2018, Resett published the "Grande" case; the female head of the Venstre political party reportedly had sex with an underage person at a wedding. Disclosing the name of a female perpetrator in a MeToo-related case was controversial at the time. Later, other newspapers also covered the case. The editor-in-chief, Helge Lurås, also conveyed an offer of payment for the young man to step forward. The monetary offer was criticized as a breach of ethics.

== See also ==
- Document.no
- Subjekt (website)
