= Kristoffer Egeberg =

Norwegian editor (born 1974)

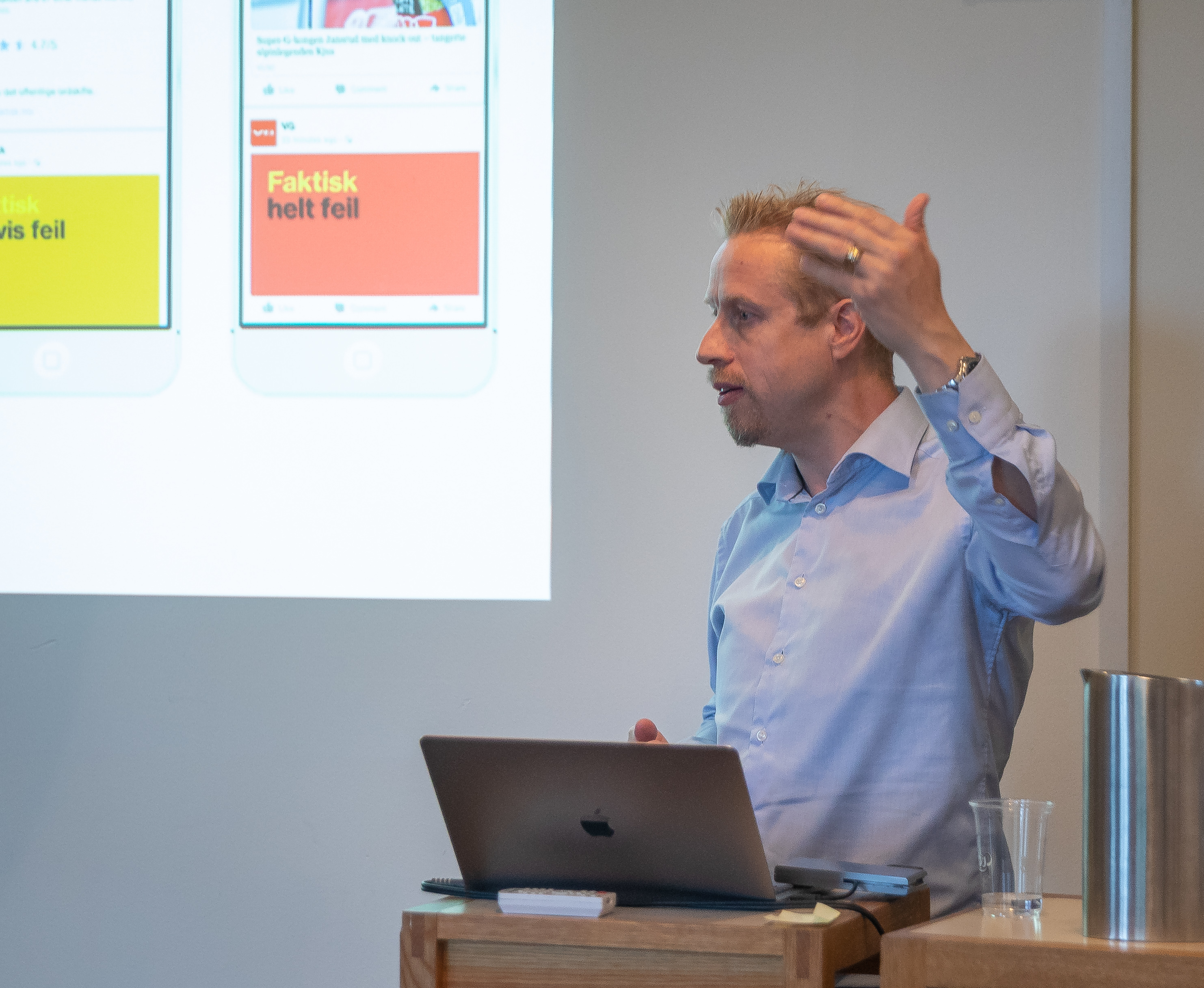
- Born: 1974 (age 51–52)
- Occupations: Journalist and web editor
- Awards: SKUP Award (2014); International Reporter's Journalism Award

Kristoffer Egeberg (born 1974) is a Norwegian editor.

== Biography ==
Working for the newspaper Dagbladet, Egeberg received the SKUP Award for 2014, for disclosure of sales of decommissioned naval ships of the Royal Norwegian Navy to Nigerian paramilitary groups. He also received the International Reporter’s Journalism Award for the same article series. In 2017 he became editor-in-chief of the new fact-checking website Faktisk.no. He had this position until 2023, when he was appointed by the Norwegian Police Security Service (PST) as head of their open source section.

Media offices
Preceded by Incumbent	Chief editor of Faktisk.no; 2017–2023	Succeeded by Olav Østrem (acting)
