= Fosli =

Fosli is a surname. Notable people with the surname include:

- Åse Fosli (1924–2009), Norwegian politician
- Halvor Fosli (born 1961), Norwegian non-fiction writer, journalist, magazine editor, and publisher
