= Subjekt =

Norwegian website

- Website type: Alternative media
- Available in: Norwegian
- Editor: Danby Choi
- Launched: 2013

Subjekt is a Norwegian website. It describes itself as a cultural newspaper, but this description has been challenged by critics, and it has also been described as a blog. It was established in 2013 by Danby Choi. The website is considered part of the Norwegian alternative media landscape, along with other right-wing outlets such as Resett.no and Document.no, to which it is often compared. The website is known for its outspoken support for Donald Trump and his Make America Great Again movement, and claimed Trump was the only good option in American politics in 2024. Several Norwegian commentators have described the website as promoting fascist ideas and MAGA ideology, and challenged its self-description as journalists.

== Content and profile ==
Subjekt has been described as a far-right publication. For example journalist Hans Petter Sjøli and Filter Nyheter's Harald S. Klungtveit have referred to it as a radical right-wing platform. Sjøli described Choi as part of a "provocative and contrarian far-right" movement, while Klungtveit described Subjekt as a "Norwegian megaphone for American fascist TV," and argued that "Subjekt has for several years seen it as a kind of mission to portray anti-fascists as idiots (...) Danby Choi's circus act in Norwegian public discourse is to appear as a "contrarian" by ridiculing everyone who takes the threats to democracy seriously."

In 2025, the website was widely condemned for publishing an article defending Curtis Yarvin, a far-right blogger who has been characterized as an apologist for terrorist Anders Behring Breivik. The philosopher Knut Jørgen Vie wrote, "I never thought I would see the day when a Breivik sympathizer would receive support in a Norwegian publication."

The website has also expressed support for Donald Trump, with Choi describing Trump as "cool." On the day of the U.S. presidential election in 2024, Subjekt published an article stating, "There is only one good option today: Donald Trump," citing concerns about "woke" culture, "trans ideology," and alleged attacks on "men and masculinity."

Critics argue that Subjekt positions itself as a self-proclaimed "liberal" publication while promoting far-right ideologies. Aksel Rogstad criticized its "self-proclaimed liberalism" as hollow, and journalist Eivind Trædal described it as a "culture war newspaper that is sliding further to the far right." Conservative historian Bård Larsen of the think tank Civita also expressed concerns, stating that he believes Subjekt "is going in the wrong direction." Andreas Bjørnbekk argued that Subjekt is promoting fascist ideas, disinformation and propaganda.

In 2024, Dagens Næringsliv reported that critics of Danby Choi labeled him as transphobic, racist, and fascist. Klungtveit further criticized Subjekt, asserting that its editor should not expect respect from "actual journalists." The publication's critics argue that it consistently attacks the left, "woke" culture, and minority groups while amplifying far-right rhetoric in the Norwegian public discourse.

Magnus Marsdal argued that Subjekt promotes MAGA ideology and is used to whitewash anti-democratic, far-right dark forces. Marsdal criticized Choi for "whitewashing" far-right activist Charlie Kirk. Former Minister of Justice Anne Holt also criticized Choi's role in public discourse.

In his 2024 autobiography, titled Kanseller meg hvis du kan: mitt oppgjør med woke [Cancel Me If You Can: My Reckoning with Woke], Choi complained about the coverage of him in mainstream media as well as Wikipedia, which he attributed to "woke" culture.

== See also ==
- Resett.no
- Document.no
