= Denis Robert =

French journalist, novelist and filmmaker

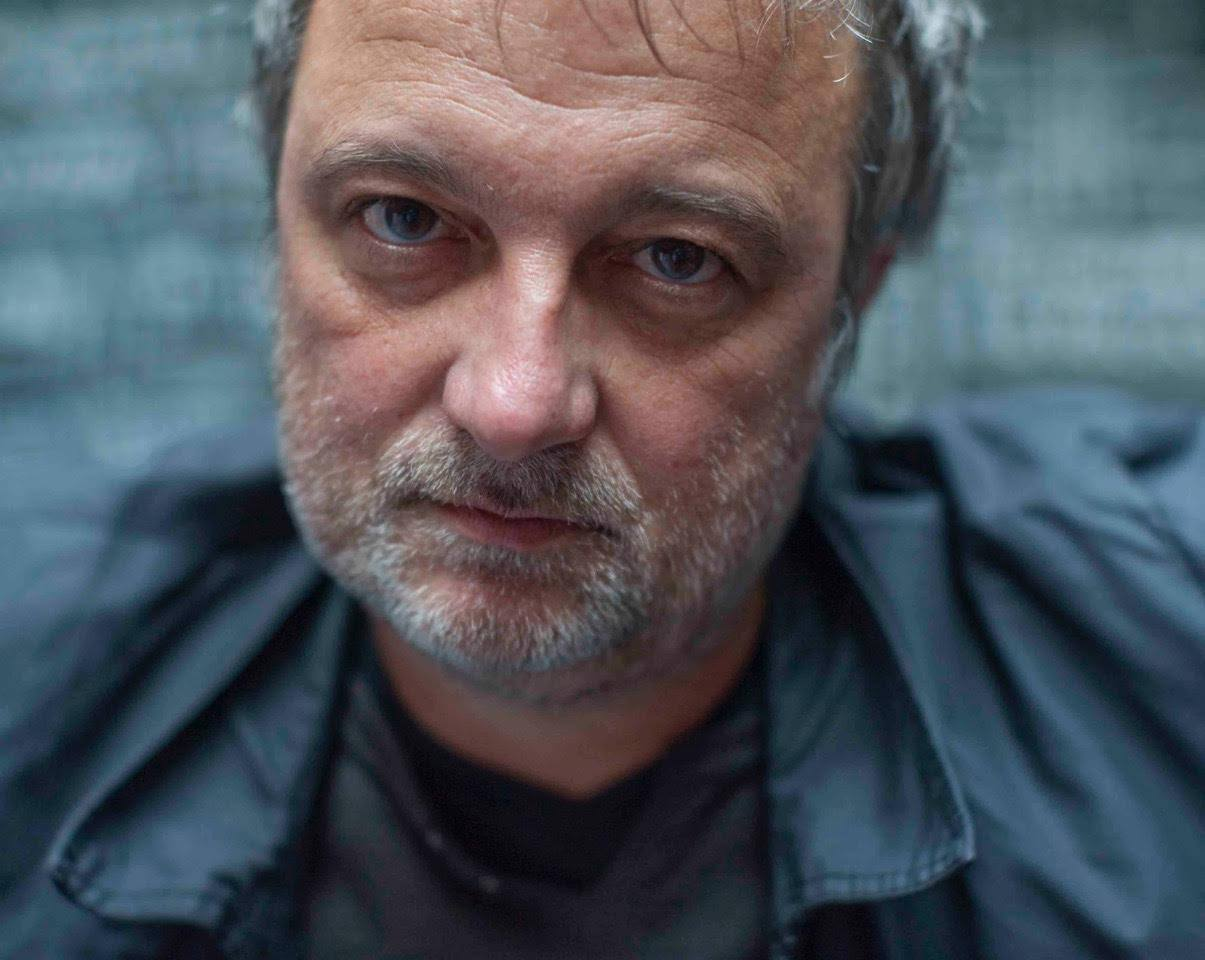
- Robert in 2016
- Born: 9 May 1958 (age 68); Moyeuvre-Grande, Lorraine, France
- Occupations: Investigative journalist, writer, filmmaker, artist
- Website: www.ladominationdumonde.blogspot.fr (closed in October 2008), Blast (webTV)

Denis Robert (French pronunciation: [dəni ʁɔbɛʁ]; born 9 May 1958) is a French investigative journalist, novelist and filmmaker. He formerly worked for twelve years for the newspaper Libération. Robert's books, films and press interviews, denouncing the opaque workings of the Clearstream clearing house, earned him into more than 60 lawsuits in France, Belgium and Luxembourg by banks, such as Bank Menatep (a Russian bank) and BGL (BNP Paribas Fortis), as well as the Clearstream company. In 2008, he was involved in a polemic with Philippe Val (former director of the magazine Charlie Hebdo) and journalist Edwy Plenel in relation to the Clearstream affair.

On 3 February 2011, after ten years of litigation, Robert was cleared by the Court of Cassation of his conviction for both of his books Révélation$ and La Boîte noire, as well as for his documentary film Les Dissimulateurs. Robert is also a painter, whose work is displayed in Paris art galleries.

== Biography ==
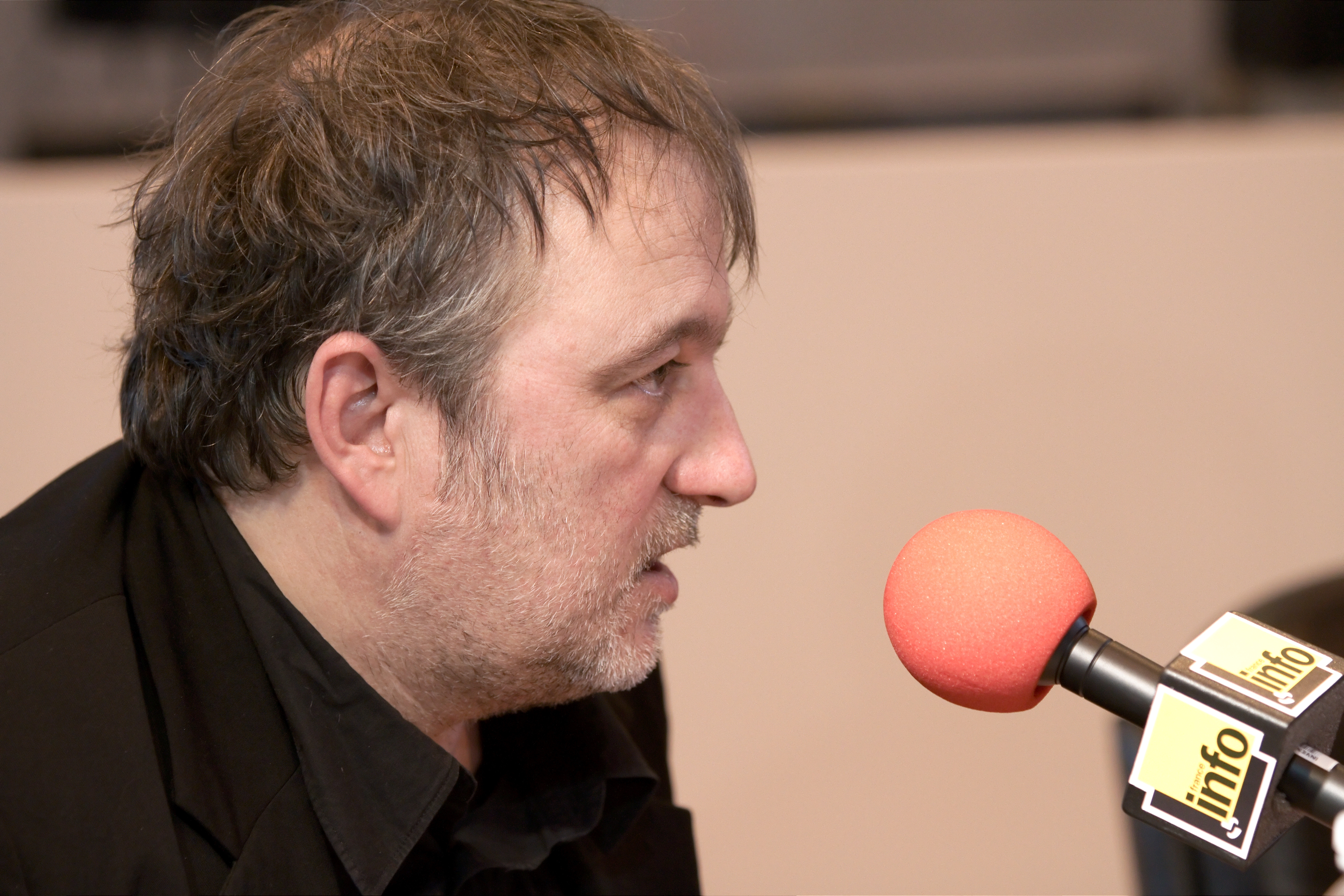
Robert at the 2010 Paris Book Fair

Robert studied psychology and obtained a Master of Advanced Studies in psycholinguistics. After starting a fanzine Santiag in Lorraine in 1982, he joined the editorial staff of the monthly magazine Actuel, where he worked for a year. At the end of 1983, he joined Libération as a journalist, first as a correspondent in Eastern France. He was then transferred to cover financial and political affairs in the society department. He resigned in 1995 to focus on his own writing work. By this time he had already published two novels, Chair Mathilde in 1991 and Je ferai un malheur in 1994. But the general public only got acquainted with him in early 1996 with his essay Pendant les affaires, les affaires continuent.

Also in 1996, Robert gathered seven anti-corruption magistrates to start the Appel de Genève (Geneva Appeal), to create a European judicial area to fight financial crime more effectively. The Appel de Genève is the subject of a book La Justice ou le Chaos, published the same year. It was followed by a dozen novels and by as many essays on investigations of the multinational finance company Clearstream.

In late 1997, Robert planned to denounce the consequences of what he calls "the machine" (the capitalist economic system) for the poorest. In Portrait de groupe avant démolition, Robert presented and illustrated a collection of street photographs of homeless persons taken by one of their own, René Taesch.

In addition to his books, Robert has directed and co-directed five documentary films, one for cinema with the cineast Philippe Harel, Journal intime des affaires en cours (1998) and later four others for television : Le cahier (1999), Les Dissimulateurs (2001), Histoire clandestine (2002), L’affaire Clearstream racontée à un ouvrier de chez Daewoo (2003).

He was also the writer of successful novels: Happiness (Original title : Le bonheur), an erotic book written in 2000 and translated into 14 languages; Une ville, published in 2004, which was adapted as a TV series; and La domination du mode, which appeared in 2006. The same year, he also published a novel on football Le milieu du terrain which resulted in several lawsuits, and an investigative book, Clearstream, l’enquête; the latter is very rare, because its sale was prohibited and it was removed from bookstores for almost a month. In late 2006, in collaboration with a painter friend, Robert published an art book, Dominations : 'étrange objet de peinture et de littérature, in parallel with a contemporary art exhibition in Paris.

In 2009 he published Dunk, a social science fiction novel. He is also the author of a successful four-volume comic strip, L’affaire des affaires.

== Early Clearstream affair ==
Just after the Appel de Genève, Robert investigated the multinational Clearstream, which at that time was unknown to the general public. He met Ernest Backes, one of the founding managers of this international clearing house.

Robert led the investigation for two years. Régis Hempel, the firm's vice-president and a former IT manager, explained that one of his tasks was to delete any trace of sensitive transactions. Three months before the publication of his book Révélation$, Robert sent a series of registered letters in which he sought explanations from Clearstream's management and from the banks under investigation.

In February 2001, the book Révélation$ came out and had an explosive effect. Robert held Cedel International (now known as Clearstream) responsible for being one of the major platforms for concealing financial transactions on a worldwide scale. He continued to condemn them by co-producing a movie Les Dissimulateurs with Pascal Lorent, as part of Canal+’s investigation show 90 minutes. Business journalists were either in disbelief or hostile to it, while some others were just unsure, perhaps because Clearstream was threatening them with endless lawsuits. The movie gained success among the alter-globalization movement.

The parliamentary commission on money laundering, chaired by Vincent Peillon and Arnaud Montebourg, took up the revelations and summoned witnesses, all of whom confirmed what the author had written.

Under pressure, a judicial inquiry was opened in Luxembourg. The CEO of Clearstream, André Lussi, a Swiss banker, was laid off and Clearstream was quickly purchased, for a large sum, by the Deutsche Börse Group. Deutsche Börse had been waiting a long time to acquire this clearing house, which allowed it to control the European markets from start to finish. Deutsche Börse compensated André Lussi, but still maintained the lawsuits against Robert (hiring Charlie Hebdo's attorney Richard Malka, among others).

In light of those developments, Robert wrote a second novel, La Boite Noire, and a second movie, broadcast by Canal+, l'Affaire Clearstream racontée à un ouvrier chez Daewoo.

== Trials ==
After publishing his book Révélation$; Robert and Ernest Backes had to face 31 suits for defamation. The complaints were raining in France, Belgium, Switzerland and even Canada, all filed by Clearstream, as well as by the Russian bank Menatep of Mikhail Khodorkovsky and by the BGL (General Bank of Luxembourg).

The publishers Les Arènes and Laurent Beccaria declared that the claims for damages exceeded their annual turnover. Canal+'s Legal Department became engaged in expensive lawsuits.

As months went by, the actions failed at first instance one after another; the plaintiffs systematically lodged appeals, which were dismissed; they then lodged appeals to the Court of Cassation, which were also dismissed. Five years later, only two pending proceedings were left, both on appeal: one after a judgement in favour of Clearstream, and the other in favour of Robert. The judges considered: “the allegations are legitimate and supported by strong arguments”.

On 11 June 2008, Robert decided to stop publishing about Clearstream, being under too much pressure.

=== Beginning of procedures in France ===
Clearstream filed three complaints for defamation against Robert, the first for his book Révélation$, the second for his book La Boîte noire and the third for his documentary film, broadcast on Canal+, Les Dissimulateurs, all having the subject of dirty money laundered by Clearstream.

=== First Instance ===
On 29 March 2004, the 17th Chamber of the Criminal Court of Paris convicted Robert for defamation, both for his book Révélation$ and for his documentary film broadcast on Canal+, on the subject of the activities of the financial institution. However, the same chamber had dismissed Clearstream's complaint about La Boite Noire in October 2003. Both Clearstream and Robert appealed against the decisions which did not turn out in their favour.

=== Appeal Court ===
In 2008, the Court of Appeal of Paris convicted Robert in three cases.

On 4 December 2006, Robert was sentenced to pay €1500 in damages for using defamatory words about Clearstream in VSD. The writer appealed against the sentence, saying that the interview in VSD had been truncated. Furthermore, he won every lawsuit filed by Clearstream about his interviews or published and broadcast articles by France 2, Le Point, Le Nouvel Observateur and other various websites.

=== Court of Cassation ===
Alleging that the decisions violated the European Convention on Human Rights, Clearstream lodged an appeal with the Court of Cassation, claiming that Clearstream's rights were being abused in being forbidden from taking legal action. The Luxembourg company claimed that it was impossible for them to be represented by a natural person in this legal process in France, as they were bound by Luxembourg law to be chaired by a board of directors of a collegial nature. On 23 May 2006, the advocate-general at the Court of Cassation, Francis Fréchèdehe, requested that both of these actions be dismissed. He assessed that Clearstream could have used the civil procedure, in which it is not mandatory to be represented by a natural person.

At last, in February 2011, Robert won these three cases in Court of Cassation, which highlighted the seriousness of the investigation, freedom of expression and the public interest.

Decision No.106 from 3 February 2011 of the Court of Cassation "breaks and cancels in its entirety" the decision of the Appeal Court, rejecting all of Clearstream's arguments. The judges commented that "the public interest in the subject and the seriousness of the investigation, led by an investigative journalist, allowed the wording and the contentious allegations, the Appeal Court violated the above-mentioned texts" therefore cancelling Robert's previous convictions. The Court of Cassation specifically stated that "when a public debate of public interest is involved, journalistic freedom includes possible resort to a certain degree of exaggeration, even provocation, in the debate".

Robert reckoned that this decision was also a reply to the attacks on him by Richard Malka and Philippe Val.

=== Indictment in Luxembourg (2006) ===
On 27 January 2006, Robert was indicted in Luxembourg for insult, calumny and slander. The complaint aimed at the denunciation in his book Révélation$ of a transaction between BCCI and BGL banks. Robert had described this transaction as "illegal", even though a decision allowing the transaction had been made by a court in Luxembourg.

Those supporting Robert emphasised that the same complaints against BGL had already been dismissed in France on two occasions. The Court of Cassation agreed with BGL and the procedures would resume. Robert and Florian Bourges (ex-auditor of Arthur Anderson, who had used the Clearstream files and provided them to Robert) were sued by Clearstream. Richard Malka was Clearstream's lawyer.

This same "sharing" of documents led to theft and breach of trust indictments in France within the context of a complaint filed by Clearstream. Robert was facing a prison sentence and a fine that can be very high in Luxembourg, in addition to lawyers' fees. In an ironic twist of fate, it is the European judicial area that he contributed to build with the Appel de Genève that allowed this procedure in the Luxembourg justice system.

Several support petitions were opened.

=== Final judgement of the Court of Cassation (2011) ===
The newspaper Le Novel Observateur reported:

"It is a victory for me, but also a precedent for all journalists" said Denis Robert after being cleared of all charges in the Court of Cassation, and the judgments stated that in long and difficult investigations there might be some inaccuracies, and even outrageous formulations, and that it is inappropriate to convict if the work has been done in good faith, in a serious manner and for the general interest.

Denis Robert also stated, "I can bring out my books again" and characterised the Luxembourg company (Clearstream) as the "best laundry in the world" and also referred to an "international finance system spiraling out of control".

== Bibliography ==
=== Novels ===
- Chair Mathilde, Ed Bernard Barrault, 1991
- Je ferai un malheur, Fayard, 1995
- Notre héros au travail, Fayard, 1997
- Tout va bien puisque nous sommes en vie, Stock, 1998
- Le Bonheur, les arènes, 2000, Pocket 2001
- Une ville, Julliard, 2003
- Le Milieu du terrain, les Arènes, 2005
- La Domination du monde, Julliard, 2006, Pocket 2007
- Une affaire personnelle, Flammarion, 2008
- Dunk, Julliard, 2009
- Vue imprenable sur la folie du monde, Les Arènes, 2013

=== Essays ===
- Pendant les "affaires", les affaires continuent, Stock, 1996, le livre de Poche, 1998
- La Justice ou le chaos, Stock, 1996, le Livre de Poche, 1998
- Deux heures de lucidité : entretien avec Noam Chomsky (with D. Robert and W. Zarachowickz), Les Arènes, 1999
- Révolte.com, Les Arènes, 2000
- Révélation$, Les Arènes, 2001
- La Boîte noire, Les Arènes, 2002
- Leçons de journalisme, 2004
- Clearstream, l'enquête, Les Arènes-Julliard, 2006,
- Au cœur de l'affaire Villemin : Mémoires d'un rat, Hugo et Compagnie, 2006,
- Tout Clearstream, éd. Les Arènes, 2011
- Mohicans, éd. Julliard, 306 p., 4 novembre 2015

=== Others and collaborations ===
- Convocation à la mise en examen des œuvres de Denis Robert, Galerie W, 2008
- Portrait de groupe avant démolition (text of Denis Robert on photos by René Taesch)
- Deux heures de lucidité : entretien avec Noam Chomsky (with Denis Robert and Weronika Zarachowickz)
- Tout va bien (scenario) with cartoon drawings of Thomas Clément, 2005,
- Journal intime des affaires en cours, scenario with Philippe Harel, Stock, 1997
- Dominations, book of Kombart and paintings, with Philippe Pasquet, Hugodoc, 2006
- L'affaire des affaires T1 "l'argent invisible", comic strip with Laurent Astier and Yan Lindingre, éd. Dargaud, 2009
- L'affaire des affaires T2 "l'enquête", comic strip with Laurent Astier, éd. Dargaud, 2009
- L'affaire des affaires T3 "Clearstream Manipulation", comic strip with Laurent Astier, éd. Dargaud, 2011
- L'affaire des affaires T4 "Justice", comic strip with Laurent Astier, éd. Dargaud, 2012
- L'affaire des affaires (L'intégrale) with Laurent Astier, éd. Dargaud, 2014
- Le circuit Mandelberg with Franck Biancarelli, éd Dargaud, 2015

== Movies ==
- Journal intime des affaires en cours (1998)
- Le Cahier, (2000)
- Les Dissimulateurs (2001)
- Histoire clandestine de ma région (with Gilles Cayatte, 2001)
- L'Affaire ClearStream racontée à un ouvrier de chez Daewoo (2002)
- Les Munch soudés à jamais, (2013)
- Mortelle épopée, with Gilles Cayatte, (2014)
- L'Enquête, de Vincent Garenq, 2015. The film traces the investigation conducted by Denis Robert, played by Gilles Lellouche.
- Cavanna, même pas mort (52 minutes, made for television with his daughter Nina Robert 2015)
- Jusqu'à l'ultime seconde j'écrirai (made for cinema with his daughter Nina Robert, released on 17 June 2015)
- Une vie d'Annette (2016), documentary on Anne Beaumanoir, produced with Nina Robert.

== Music ==
- Voleurs de poules, pilleurs de foule, 2007, by DR et les Luxembourgeois.
