= Paul Gillon =

French comics artist

Paul Gillon (11 May 1926 – 21 May 2011) was a French comics artist. He won the 1982 Grand Prix de la ville d'Angoulême.

Born in Paris, he considered fashion, theater and cinema, and only by accident made a career as a comics author. In the magazine Vaillant, he continued the older series Lynx Blanc, and created Fils de Chine and Cormoran. From 1959 until 1972, he drew 13 rue de l'Espoir for France Soir and also did series for the Journal de Mickey.

Together with Jean-Claude Forest, he created the science fiction cosmic opera series Les naufragés du temps (Lost in Time) and in L'Écho des savanes (Echo of the Savannahs) he produced the erotic comics La Survivante (The Survivor) and Jéhanne. He died in Amiens.

== Works ==
- Lynx Blanc (White Lynx), in the collection Grandes Aventures Vaillant, 1961 (first published between 1948 and 1957)
  - #11: Tonnerre sur les Îles (Thunder on the Islands)
  - #15: Aventures dans la Brousse (Adventures in the Bushland)
- Jérémie (published in Pif gadget between 1968 and 1972)
1. Les dieux barbares (The Savage Gods), Lombard, 1973; Les Humanoïdes Associés, 1981
2. La mijaurée, la mégère et le nabot (The Prim Miss, the Shrew and the Runt), Lombard, 1974; Les Humanoïdes Associés, 1982
3. Intrigues à la Jamaïque (Intrigue in Jamaica), Les Humanoïdes Associés, 1979
4. Le fort de San-Juan (The Fort of San Juan), Les Humanoïdes Associés, 1980
- Les naufragés du temps (Lost in Time, first four volumes with Jean-Claude Forest) Les Humanoïdes Associés
1. L'étoile endormie (The Sleeping Star) - 1974 - ISBN 2-7316-0124-8
2. La mort sinueuse (Sinuous Death) - 1975 - ISBN 2-7316-0123-X
3. Labyrinthes (Labyrinths) - 1976 - ISBN 2-7316-0034-9
4. L'univers cannibale (The Cannibal Universe) - 1976 - ISBN 2-7316-0037-3
5. Tendre chimère (Sweet Dream) - 1977 - ISBN 2-7316-0220-1
6. Les maîtres-rêveurs (The Dream Masters) - 1978 - ISBN 2-7316-0036-5
7. Le sceau de Beselek (The Saw of Beselek) - 1979 - ISBN 2-7316-0036-5
8. Ortho-Mentas - 1981 - ISBN 2-7316-0106-X
9. Terra - 1984 - ISBN 2-7316-0297-X
10. Le cryptomère (The Cryptomeria) - 1989 - ISBN 2-7316-0444-1
- Histoire du socialisme en France (History of Socialism in France), Service de l'Homme, 1977 (introduction by François Mitterrand ISBN 2-902648-02-2)
- With Roger Lecureux: Fils de Chine (Son of China), Glénat, 1978 (first published between 1950 and 1953)
- Wango, Furioso (Futuropolis Diffusion), 1980 (first published between 1958 and 1960)
- 13 rue de l'Espoir (Number 13, Hope Street), Les Humanoïdes Associés (with Jacques and François Gall between 1959 and 1972)
  - Volume 1: 1980
  - Volume 2: 1982
- Téva, Les Humanïdes Associés, 1982 (based on a TV series from 1973)
- Les Léviathans
1. Les Léviathans (The Leviathans), Les Humanoïdes Associés, 1982; retitled Le Plan Aspic, Les Humanoïdes Associés, 1990
2. La dent de l'alligator (Alligator's Tooth), Les Humanoïdes Associés, 1990; Albin Michel, 2000
3. Réaction en chaîne (Chain Reaction), Albin Michel, 2000
- Les Mécanoïdes Associés (The Society of Mechanoids), Humanoïdes Associés, coll. Pied Jaloux, 1982
- Capitaine Cormoran (Paul Gillon - complete works part 1), Humanoïdes Associés, 1983 (first published between 1954 and 1959)
- Moby-Dick, Hachette, 1983 (with Jean Ollivier)
- Processus de Survie (Process of Survival), Humanoïdes Associés, coll. Pied Jaloux, 1984
- Notre-Dame de Paris, Hachette, 1985 (with Claude Gendrot)
- La survivante (The Survivor)
1. La survivante - October 1985
2. L’héritier (The Heir) - October 1987
3. La revanche (Revenge) - April 1990
4. L’ultimatum (Ultimatum) - November 1991
- With Patrick Cothias, Au nom de tous les miens (For Those I Loved), based on Martin Gray
1. Les fourmis (The Ants), Glénat, 1986
2. Les renards (The Foxes), Glénat, 1987
- Jehanne (Joan of Arc), Albin Michel
1. La sève et le sang (Sap and Blood), 1993
2. La pucelle (The Maiden), 1997
- With Denis Lapière, La dernière des salles obscures (The Last of the Dark Halls), Dupuis
  - Part 1: 1996
  - Part 2: 1998
- Le contrat (The Contract), Albin Michel, 2001.
- La veuve blanche (White Widow), coll. Aire Libre, Dupuis, 2002.
- With Frank Giroud, Le Décalogue, part 7: La conspiration (The Conspiracy), 2002.
- With Richard Malka, L'Ordre de Cicéron ("Cicero's Order")
1. Le procès (The Trial), Glénat, 2004
2. Mis en examen (Cross-examination), Glénat, 2006
- With Frank Giroud, Quintet
  - Deuxième mouvement - Histoire d'Alban Méric (Second Movement: the Story of Alban Méric), coll. Empreinte(s), Dupuis, 2005

== Awards ==
- 1972: Prix Phénix for Jérémie
- 1974: Prix Phénix for Les Naufragés du temps
- 1978: Best French Artist at the Angoulême International Comics Festival, France
- 1982: Grand Prix de la ville d'Angoulême
- 1986: Grand Prix RTL for Au nom de tous les miens
- 1986: Special Jury Award at the 17th Lucca Festival
- 1998: Grand Prix Yellow Kid at the Lucca Festival

== Sources ==
- 1978: Schtroumfanzine - Les Cahiers de la bande dessinée, no. 36 - Dossier Gillon
- 1986: Champagne ! no. 2/3, October - Interview Gillon
- 1982: b.d. bulle (magazine of the Angoulême Festival), no. 10 - Dossier Gillon
- 1998 : Monsieur Gillon, biography by Claude Gendrot, published together with La dernière des salles obscures

=== Videos ===
- Paul Gillon, by Jean-Loup Martin, Cendrane Films / 8 Mont Blanc productions, 1997 (25' 30")
