= Neue Berliner Illustrierte =

East German weekly magazine (1945–1991)

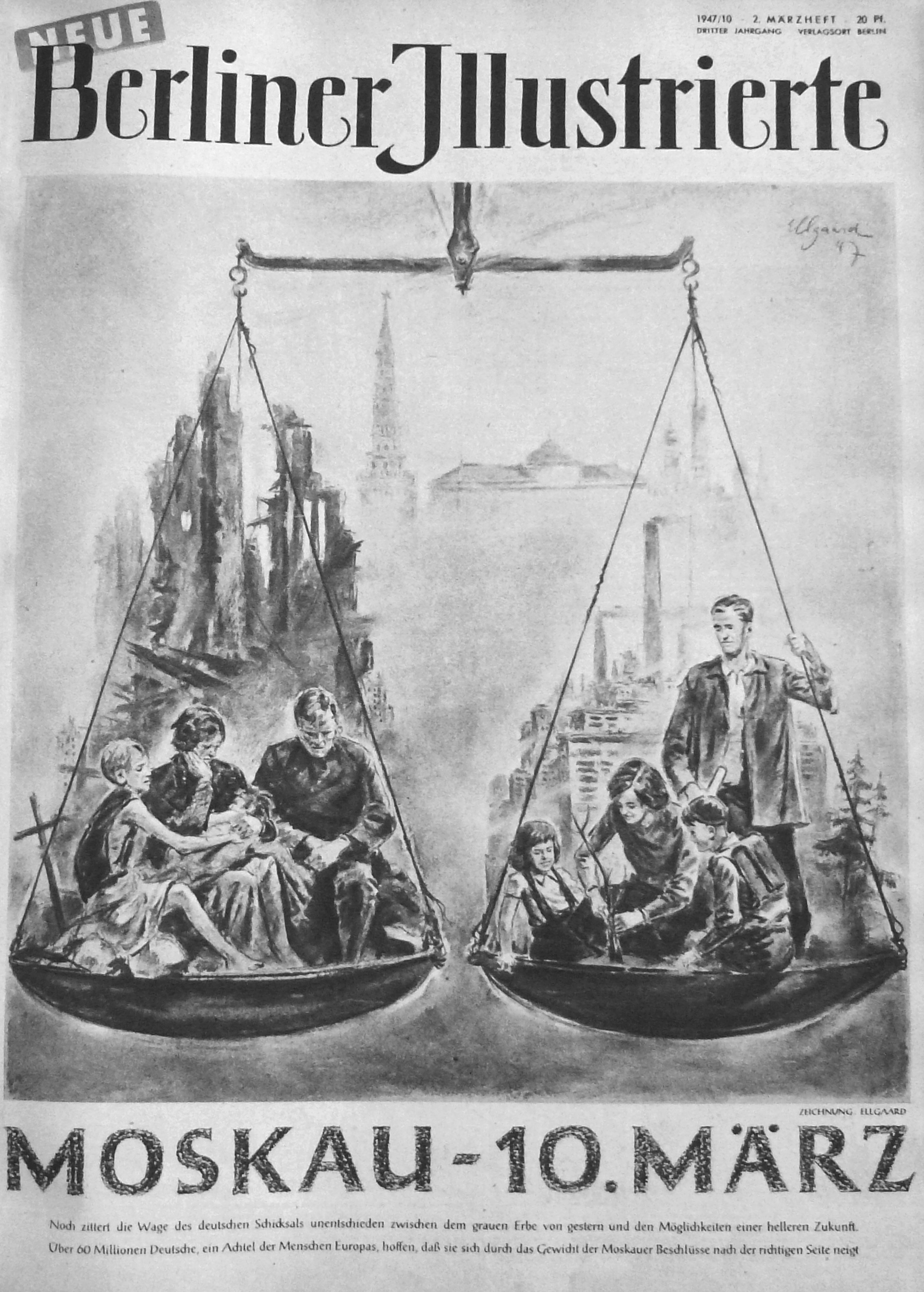
- Cover page dated March 1947
- Categories: News magazine
- Frequency: Weekly
- Founded: October 1945
- Final issue: October 1991
- Country: East Germany; Germany
- Based in: Berlin
- Language: German

Neue Berliner Illustrierte (German: New Berlin Illustrated; abbreviated as NBI) was a weekly illustrated magazine which existed between 1945 and 1991. It was published in East Germany and then in Germany following the German reunification. Its title was a reference to Berliner Illustrirte Zeitung which was an influential German publication at the beginning of the 20th century.

== History and profile ==
Neue Berliner Illustrierte was first published in Berlin in October 1945. It was modeled on Arbeiter-Illustrierte-Zeitung. Shortly after its start it began to enjoy higher levels of circulation in East Germany. The magazine came out weekly and covered various topics, including politics, health-related issues, movies, novels and picture stories designed for children. Another topic covered was the reasons of divorce in East Germany, technological advances in the communist countries and socialist heroes. All these topics were accompanied by photographs and featured to influence the perspectives of the East Germans in line with the official ideology of the state.

It was printed in black and white until 1957 when it was redesigned as a color publication. The magazine was renamed as NBI Neue Berliner Illustrierte in 1960. Another magazine entitled Zeit im Bild was merged into the NBI in 1969. The magazine had a circulation of 800,000 copies for three decades from the 1960s to the 1980s. Following the German reunification it was acquired by the Gruner + Jahr publishing house and folded in October 1991.
