= Prosa =

Norway's largest literary magazine

Prosa is Norway's largest literary magazine. The magazine is published on a bimonthly basis and has been in circulation since 1995.

== History and profile ==
The first issue of Prosa was published in 1995. It is a magazine dealing with prose, academic literature, writing culture, and cultural politics, and contains literary essays, reviews, and academic related articles. The magazine prides itself on its editorial independence, and is published by the Norwegian Non-Fiction Writers and Translators Association (NFF). It is published six times per year.

Karianne Bjellås Gilje has been editor since 2006. Former editors are Mari Toft (1995–99) and Halvor Fosli (2000–05).
