= Richard Malka =

French lawyer and writer (born 1968)

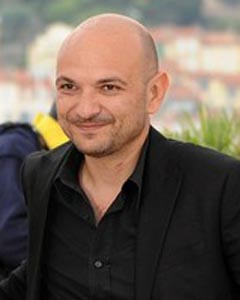
- Born: 6 June 1968 (age 58); Paris, France
- Occupations: Lawyer, comics writer, novelist

Richard Malka (born 6 June 1968) is a French lawyer, comics writer and novelist. As lawyer Malka in 2007 successfully defended Charlie Hebdo editor Philippe Val against charges of racism following the magazine's publication of Mohammad caricatures. Other clients include Clearstream, Dominique Strauss-Kahn and Caroline Fourest.

== Early life and education ==
Malka was born in the 11th arrondissement of Paris to Jewish parents from Morocco. His father was a tailor, his mother a housewife and he has two brothers. He obtained the baccalauréat in 1986 and became a lawyer in 1992 after first having studied science and business.

== Career as lawyer ==
As lawyer he started to work for Georges Kiejman and started his own law firm in 1999.

=== Social debates ===
He often featured in emblematic trials and current social debates: the fight for the right to blasphemy, the defense of Charlie Hebdo in the trial regarding the caricatures of Muhammad, the defense of the Center of Contemporary Art's Director in the trial regarding the diffusion of pornographic images of minors in the course of the Présumés innocents exhibit, the defense of the motion picture on the terrorist Carlos made by Daniel Leconte and Olivier Assayas.

For the National Organization of Publishers, he published a book entitled La gratuité, c’est le vol – 2015 : la fin du droit d’auteur ? and gave away 50 000 copies. The book was published with the support of the National Organization of Publishers, in the course of a battlet against a reform project of author's rights brought by the European Union.

=== Political cases ===
Malka worked as an attorney for the nutritionist Jean-Michel Cohen in his lawsuit against Dr Pierre Dukan. He also worked for Marek Halter, for whom he obtained the conviction of former French Minister of Justice Rachida Dati for defamatory statements.

In 2010 Malka defended his prior boss Kiejman in a defamation suit brought by Olivier Metzner and Françoise Bettencourt Meyers. Kiejman, who advocate for Liliane Bettencourt in the Bettencourt affair had accused Metzner, who was advocate for Françoise Bettencourt-Meyers; of being the brain behind a plot against Liliane Bettencourt. In 2011 the court found Kiejman's words were defamatory, but that they were stated in good faith and Kiejman was acquitted of wrongdoing.

Malka worked as an advocate for Clearstream in the Clearstream affair where Clearstream sued investigating journalist Denis Robert for libel. Robert was eventually cleared of all charges.

In 2015 he supported former French Prime Minister Manuel Valls in his trial against comedian Dieudonné. Malka said Dieudonné belonged "in an asylum" and this statement brought him a conviction for public abuse in July 2016. He appealed his sentence and was acquitted by the Court of Appeal of Paris on 6 July 2017.

=== Religious cases ===
Malka was advocate for the day care center Baby-Loup who fired a woman because she wore hijab in 2008, alleging that the hijab violated the center's secular nature. The Court of Cassation in 2014 ruled that the center was within its right to fire the employee.

=== Public figures and intellectuals ===
In 2011, Malka was hired by Dominique Strauss-Kahn and Anne Sinclair to take various legal actions against various media regarding the Carlton affair and related issues. In 2015 Strauss-Kahn was acquitted.

In 2014 Malka defended Carla Bruni in her trial against Patrick Buisson, former counselor of President Nicolas Sarkozy, regarding illegal recordings.

In 2015 Malka featured in the trial of businessman Beny Steinmetz against the French newspaper Le Canard Enchaîné. In 2016 he worked as a lawyer for the French essayist Pascal Bruckner, who has been sued twice for defamatory statements on two associations: Les Indigènes de la République and Les Indivisibles. Bruckner was acquitted.

In 2016 Malka worked as Martin d’Orgeval's lawyer, partner of François-Marie Banier. Both of them were sued for weakness abuse in the Bettencourt affair. On 24 May in the appeal trial he stood out in court with his argument. He obtained a prison and financial redemption dismissal for his client.

In 2017 he featured in the Paris criminal court alongside fellow lawyer Eric Dupond-Moretti in order to defend Amina Friloux, accused of poisoning her husband. Friloux was acquitted.

=== Media ===
Malka first met with Charlie Hebdo as an advocate in 1994 at a time the magazine was often attacked by Alliance générale contre le racisme et pour le respect de l'identité française et chrétienne (AGRIF) for anti-clericalism and by Front National. He remained close to the people at the magazine. In 2007, Malka and Kiejman defended Charlie Hebdo's editor Philippe Val in a suit for incitement to racism by Union of Islamic Organisations of France and the Grand Mosque of Paris following the magazine's publication of Muhammad caricatures. Val was acquitted. Malka also assisted Charlie Hebdo before and after the Charlie Hebdo shootings. In 2015, Malka tried to prevent the publication of Charpie Hebdo, a journal mocking Charlie Hebdo.

He also worked as a lawyer for radio groups such as NRJ and Beur FM, for publishers Association and Cherche midi, for newspaper Metro and Entrevue and for several journalists as well as large French news agency such as Tony Comiti Productions and Tac-Presse.

He featured in the movie C’est dur d’être aimé par des cons (Official choice Cannes 2008), relating the trials of Charlie Hebdo regarding their caricatures.

In 2012, Malka and Keijman defended Caroline Fourest and Fiammetta Venner, who had co-authored the biography Marine Le Pen, in a defamation lawsuit filed by Marine Le Pen, her father, Jean-Marie Le Pen and Front National. The authors were acquitted on most accounts by a Paris court, but a couple of sentences were deemed to be defamatory and the authors fined for those.

=== Recognition ===
In 2010 GQ Magazine ranked him among the 30 most influential people in the media in France. In its October 2012 edition GQ gave him the fifteenth position in its ranking of "the most powerful lawyers in France". In 2013 GQ ranked him at the same position. In 2014 he was ranked as well as in 2015. In 2016 he was ranked ninth most powerful French lawyer.

== Career as (cartoon writer) an author ==
- Collective work

Having gravitated close to the comics world for years (through his work with Charlie Hebdo and Association), he started writing cartoon scenarios in 2004.

In 2004, Malka published the first issue of the comics L'Ordre de Cicéron, illustrated by Paul Gillon. Later three other issues have been published. The series follow a family involved in finance and law in the US and France from the 1930s to contemporary times.

He also launched another series of comics entitled Section financière along with Andrea Mutti. In 2006 he co-authored the book entitled La Face kärchée de Sarkozy with journalist Philippe Cohen and cartoonist Riss. The book sold 200 000 copies.

In 2011 he took over the scenario of Les Pieds Nickelés with Ptiluc and Luz, and published a science fiction series with Juan Giménez. In 2011 he co-authored La face crashée de Marine Le Pen with Riss and Saïd Mahrane. He published more than twenty comics. Cumulated sales of his work total more than hundreds of thousands copies.

- La Vie de Palais (2014)

In 2014, he published La vie de palais : il était une fois les avocats..., illustrated by Catherine Meurisse which tells the story of a young female advocate named Jessica Chaillette, "exploited by her boss, underpaid, waiting for her clients’ gratitude". Ondine Millot wrote in a review in Libération that the cartoon was pretty, malignant and funny while at the same time giving information on how the law system works.

=== Novelist ===
In January 2018 Malka published his first novel entitled Tyrannie. The heart of the novel is the "criminal lawsuit of 25 days" of a political refugee named Oscar Rimah, charged for premeditated murder of the Secretary of the Ambassador of his origin country, where an Aztride dictator has seized power. Raphaël Constant, a renowned French lawyer has to defend Rimah. During this "political trial", he explores the duality of having to defend the symbolic value of Rimah's act, an act that was carried out in order to denounce the Aztride dictatorship.

Malka claims that he wants to explore the "behind the scene of a criminal lawsuit" and "think about the dangers of our time", based upon what his experience as a lawyer inspired him. The novel ponders "the danger of totalitarianism for individual freedom". Tyrannie also depicts a totalitarian dystopia that had manage to impose itself in our contemporary world, seducing people through an ideology at the crossroads of politics, philosophy and religion. For Malka, the key to totalitarianism is the human fascination for it, allowing people adhesion to these authorial regimes.

Malka said he was inspired by 1984 written by George Orwell, a "founder" and "structuring" novel. Critics noted this inspiration, stating that Malka's style was "half judiciary half-Orwellian".

=== Publications ===
- L'Ordre de Cicéron, with Paul Gillon (issues 1 à 3) and Jean-Michel Ponzio (issue 4), Glénat, collection Caractère.
  - 2004 : Le procès.
  - 2006 : Mis en examen.
  - 2009 : Le survivant.
  - 2012 : Verdicts.
- Section financière, with Andrea Mutti, Vents d'Ouest, collection Turbulences :
  - 2006 : Corruption.
  - 2007 : Délit d'initié.
  - 2008 : Neuro-terrorisme.
  - 2012 : Paradis artificiels.
- PULSIONS, co-written with Éric Corbeyran, illustrated by Defali.
  - 2008 : Issue I (Hugo).
  - 2010 : Issue II (Camille).
- Les Z, with Volante, 12bis :
  - 2010 : Issue 1 (Setif-Paris) ISBN 978-2356480484
- Segments, with Juan Gimenez, Glénat, collection Grafica
  - 2011 : Issue 1 (Lexopolis) ISBN 978-2723473729, preface by Claude Lanzmann.
  - 2012 : Issue 2 (Voluptide) ISBN 978-2723489348, preface by Marek Halter.
  - 2014 : Issue 3 (Neo-Sparte) ISBN 978-2723497107
- 2014 : La vie de palais : il était une fois les avocats..., illustrated by Catherine Meurisse, Marabout ISBN 978-2501099530

Political-humoristic cartoons :

- 2006 : La Face kärchée de Sarkozy, with Philippe Cohen (co-writer) and Riss (cartoonist) ISBN 2-7493-0309-5

Investigation on Nicolas Sarkozy before him accessing French Presidency during the French Presidential Election of 2007; followed by, after his election :

- 2007 : La Face kärchée de Sarkozy, la suite : Sarko ISBN 978-2-7493-0400-7
- 2008 : Rien à branler, supplement to issue 828 of Charlie Hebdo
- 2008 : Carla et Carlito ou la Vie de château, bis-Fayard, ISBN 978-2-35648-034-7
- 2010 : La Pire Espèce, with Agathe André, Ptiluc and TieKo, Grasset/Vent d’Ouest, 2010.
- 2011 : Les Pieds Nickelés, Vents d’Ouest, with Ptiluc and Luz, ISBN 978-2-7493-0648-3
- 2016 : La Face crashée de Marine Le Pen, with Saïd Mahrane (co-author) and Riss (cartoonist), Grasset

Essay :

- 2015 : La gratuité, c'est le vol : 2015, la fin du droit d'auteur ?, Paris, National Organization of Publishers, (ISBN 2-909677-80-X)

Novels :

- 2018 : Tyrannie, Editions Grasset, ISBN 9782246858942
