= Kim Møller =

Danish blogger

- Born: 1971 (age 54–55)
- Education: Aarhus University (MA)
- Occupation: Blogger
- Known for: Uriasposten blog

Kim Møller (born 1971) is a Danish blogger and former editor of the political news blog Uriasposten.

== Activities ==
Møller grew up in Lystrup and studied history at Aarhus University, receiving a Master of Arts (cand.mag.) degree. He comes from a working-class background and was formerly a leftist. He has later described himself as national conservative, and founded Uriasposten in 2003, which has been described as the most popular Danish political blog. The blog was characterised by harsh criticism of migration, Muslims, Islam and left-wing politics, and has been described as being part of the counter-jihad movement.

Møller published the book Vejen til Damaskus: dansk islamforskning 1885-2005 in 2008, which criticised the modern Danish scholar on Islam, Jørgen Bæk Simonsen, and generated a major debate in Danish media.

In 2010, Møller and a friend were violently attacked by up to ten Antifascistisk Aktion activists while photographing during a demonstration in Aarhus.

In 2016, Uriasposten was briefly shut down as Møller became the editor of Document.dk, a Danish edition of Document.no. Møller finally closed Uriasposten down in 2022, after what he described as persecution by left-wing activists, authorities and Danmarks Radio, with threats of legal action for alleged copyright violations.

In 2021 Møller was charged with having shared a photo of a murder victim in the 2020 Nice stabbing having her throat slit. He was first acquitted, then sentenced to a suspended jail sentence after an appeal, but finally acquitted by the Supreme Court in 2024.

== Bibliography ==
- Vejen til Damaskus: dansk islamforskning 1885-2005 [The road to Damascus: Danish Islam research 1885-2005] (in Danish). Lysias for Trykkefrihedsselskabets bibliotek. 2008. ISBN 978-8798919865.
