= Catherine Meurisse =

French cartoonist

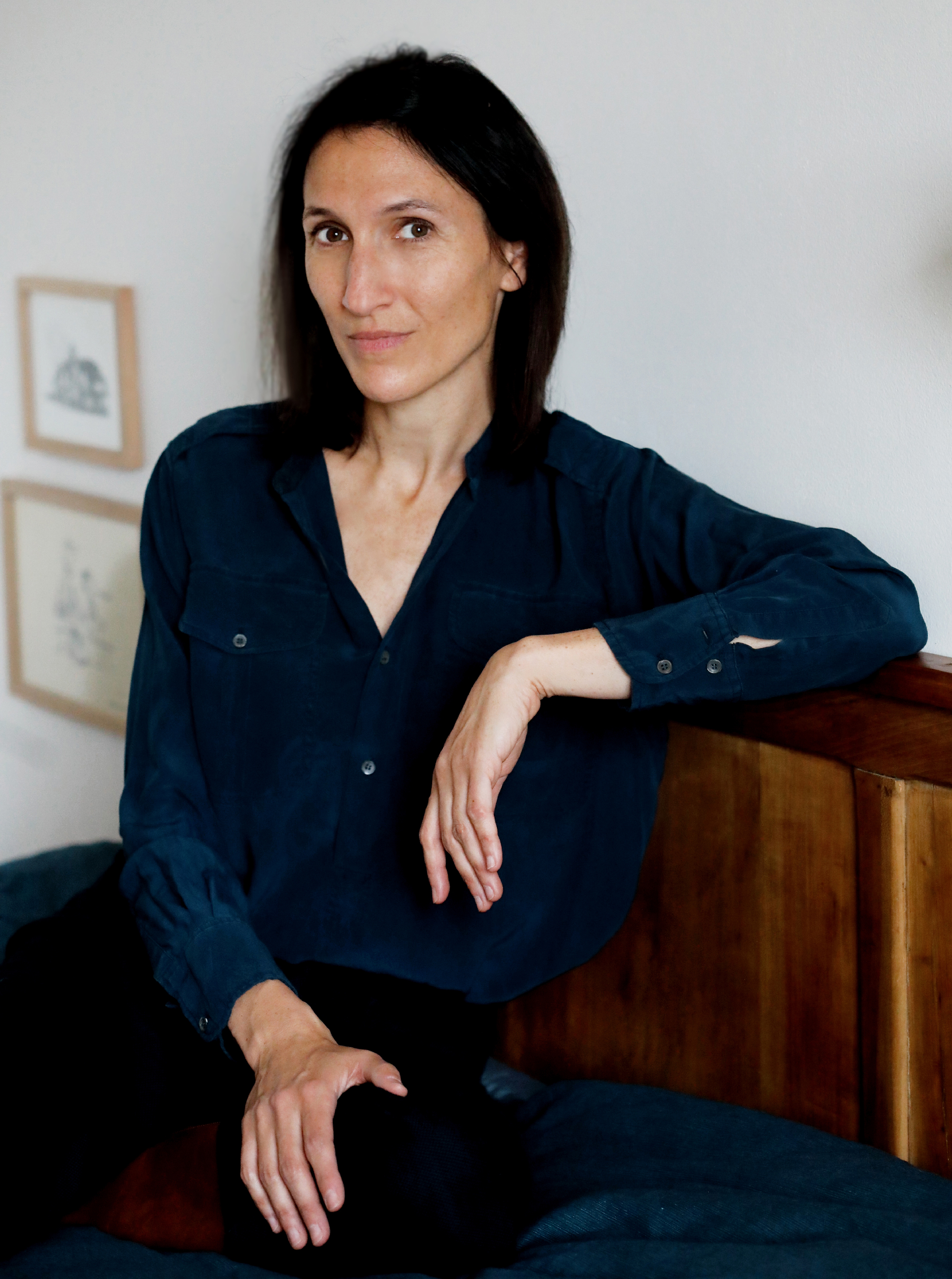
Catherine Meurisse - Rita Scaglia

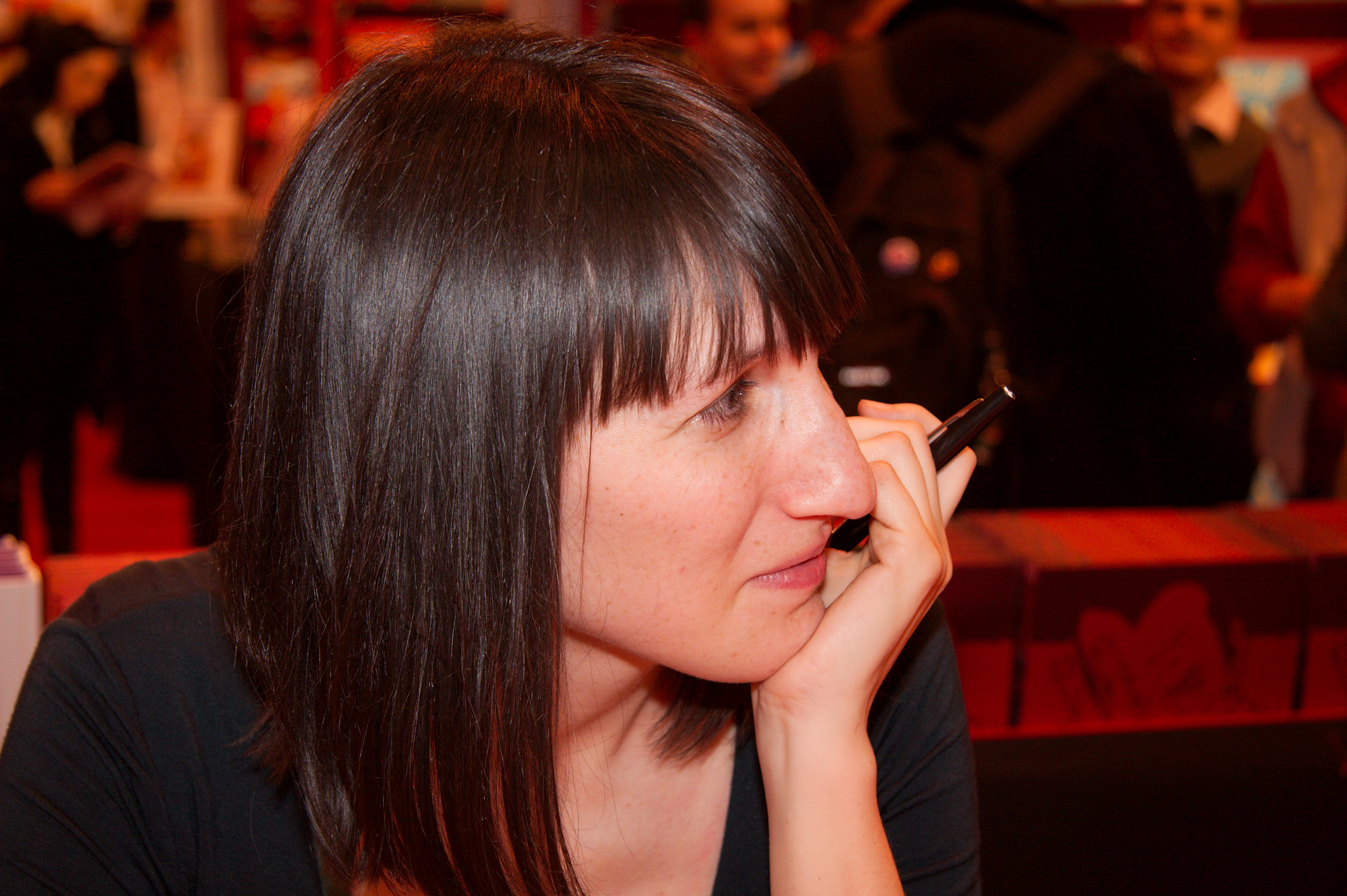
Catherine Meurisse at the Salon du livre de Paris March, 2008

Catherine Meurisse (born February 8, 1980) is a French illustrator, cartoonist, and comic strip author. She was elected to the Académie des Beaux-Arts on January 15, 2020. She is the first cartoonist to become a member of the Academy.

== Life and career ==
Born in Niort in 1980 and interested in drawing since she was young, she graduated in modern languages and French philology from the University of Poitiers. She also has a degree in illustration from the Ecole Supérieure Estienne in Paris and the École Nationale Supérieure des Arts Décoratifs (ENSAD).

At the age of 17, she won first prize in the National School Cartoon Competition organized by the Angoulême Festival, which encouraged her to become a professional cartoonist. During her academic studies, she was also awarded the Presse Citron prize of the Estienne school (2000) and published a work based on an assignment for the ENSAD, Causerie sur Delacroix (2005), an adaptation of the posthumous tribute Alexandre Dumas paid to the painter Eugène Delacroix in 1864.

Meurisse's solo debut came in 2008 with the graphic novel Mes hommes de lettres, where she takes a humorous look at French literary figures. This album was followed by Savoir-vivre ou mourir (2010) and Le Pont des arts (2012). In 2014, the publication of Moderne Olympia, a work published by the Musée d'Orsay and inspired by Édouard Manet's Olympia, earned Meurisse her first nomination at the Angoulême Festival.

At the same time, Meurisse made commissioned illustrations for magazines and worked from 2005 to 2015 for the satirical magazine Charlie Hebdo. Much of her work is collected in several collected albums. The author worked there for the following ten years, and in 2014 she was promoted to the editorial team. However, her career was marked by the attack on Charlie Hebdo in January 2015, in which twelve people were killed; the author was spared because she was unable to arrive in time for the scheduled meeting, although she did hear the attack on her way to the office. Meurisse was one of the contributors to issue 1178, took five months to return to work as a result of the ensuing trauma, and eventually channeled her entire experience into the graphic novel La Légèreté (Lightness; 2016), a finalist in the official section of the 2017 Angoulême Festival.

In late 2018 she published Les Grands Espaces (The Great Outdoors), set in the natural landscape of the Poitou marshland. In 2019 Catherine Meurisse lived for several months at Villa Kujoyama, a residence for artists in Kyoto, where she tried to resume her work under a new perspective, Japanese landscapes. Shortly after that period, Typhoon Hagibis devastated part of the country. From these two events, came the album La jeune fille et la mer, published by Editorial Dargaud in France.

On January 15, 2020, she became the first comic artist to be accepted into the Académie des Beaux-Arts. She was also nominated for the Angoulême Festival Grand Prix in 2020 and in 2023.

== Selected works ==
- Causerie sur Delacroix (text by Alexandre Dumas), 2005
- Mes Hommes de lettres, 2008
- Savoir-vivre ou mourir, 2010
- Drôles de femmes, (text by Julie Birmant), 2010
- Le Pont des arts, 2012
- Moderne Olympia, 2014
- La Légèreté, 2016
- Scènes de la vie hormonale, 2016
- Les Grands Espaces, colors by Isabelle Merlet, 2018
- La jeune femme et la mer, 2021
