= Anders Giæver =

Norwegian journalist and author (born 1961)

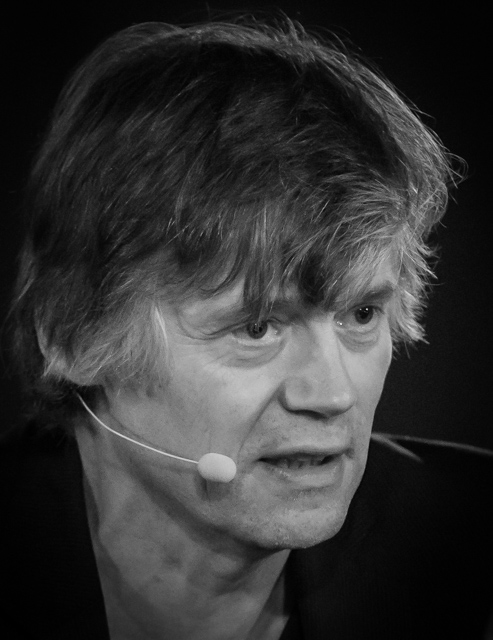
Anders Giæver during recording of a podcast in 2015.

Anders Giæver (born 27 August 1961) is a Norwegian journalist and author who has been a commentator in Verdens Gang since 2000. Since 2004, he also leads the editorial section of the newspaper. In the period 2008–2011, he was the newspaper's correspondent in New York. Before joining VG, he was arts and culture editor in Dagsavisen and he has also worked in Dagbladet and Aftenposten. His background is in music journalism.

Giæver was central in the coverage of Anders Behring Breivik after the 2011 Norway attacks. He was critical of the first psychiatric evaluation which found that Breivik had paranoid schizophrenia.

In 2015, Giæver described how anonymous complaints against employees may curtail freedom of speech. Hanne Tolg, an employee of the North Wales Fire and Rescue Service, decided to quit her job rather than facing what Giæver claimed to be a "Kafkaesque" process to defend herself against anonymous complaints, due to her writings in the far-right website Document.no.

Giæver has published a book on Walt Disney, two about newspaper cartoons in Norway and participated in a book about Jokke & Valentinerne.

== Publications ==
- Jakten på onkel Walt (2001)
- Sladder. Bedre enn sitt rykte (2004)
- Gutta - på veien med Jokke & Valentinerne (with others) (2005)
- Over streken - Avistegninger i grenseland (editor) (2006)
- Øyenvitne (2013)
