= Faktisk.no =

Norwegian fact checking website

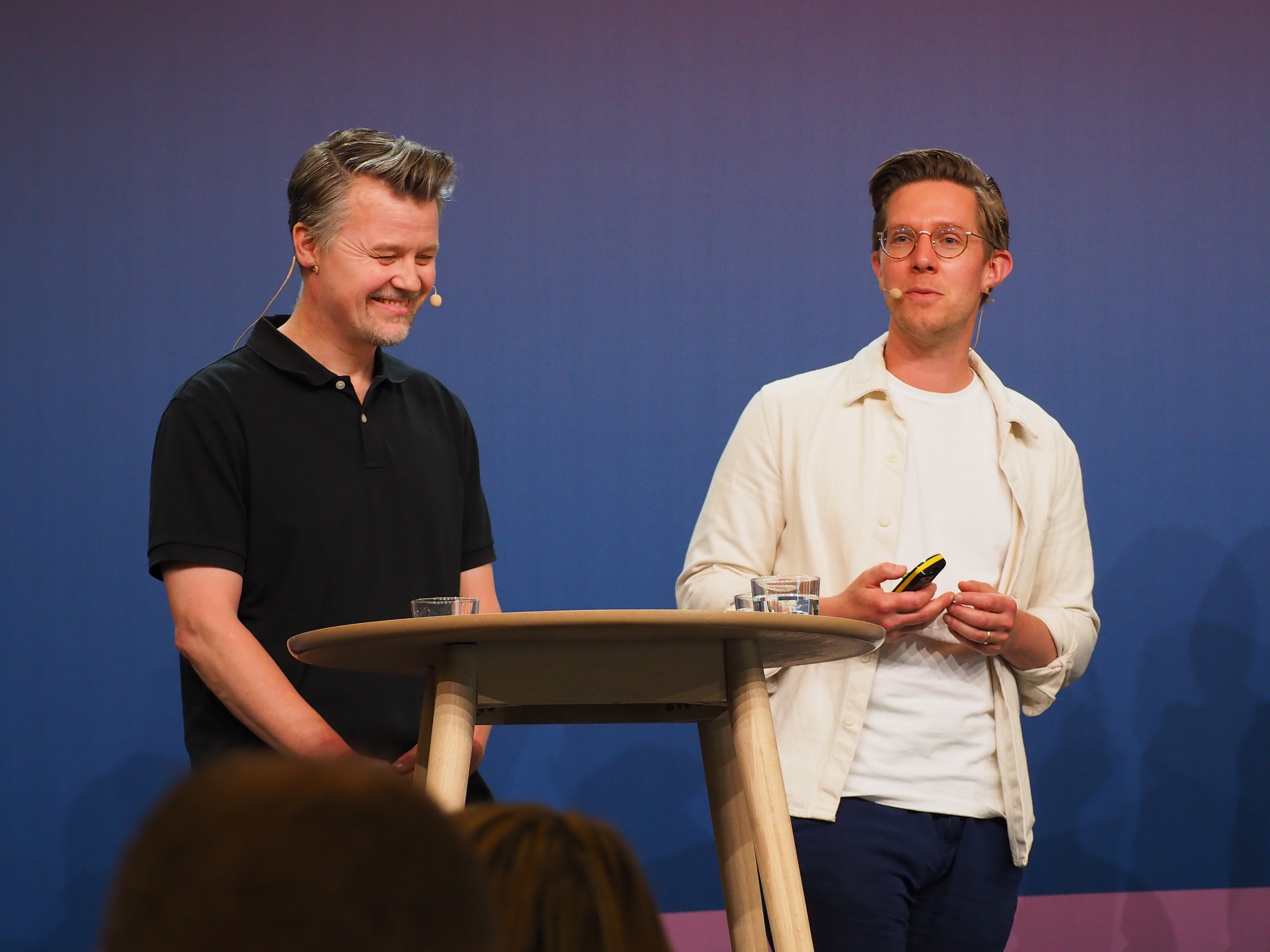
Olav Østrem and Morten Langfeldt Dahlback from Faktisk.no at the Internet Governance Forum 2025

Faktisk.no ("Actually.no") is a Norwegian fact-checking website produced through a cooperation between major media companies of Norway, including the state broadcasting company NRK, the media conglomerate Schibsted (which owns Verdens Gang and Aftenposten) and the liberal newspaper Dagbladet. It is part of the International Fact-Checking Network. The website was founded in 2017. Kristoffer Egeberg, editor-in-chief since its inception, announced his resignation with immediate effect in June 2023 to assume a position in the Norwegian secret surveillance and intelligence service PST. In 2018 Faktisk.no announced a partnership with Facebook to fact-check content on the platform.
