= Social photography =

Subcategory of photography

Social photography is a subcategory of photography focusing upon the technology, interaction and activities of individuals who take photographs. Digital cameras, photo sharing websites and the Internet have enabled new tools and methods of social networking while consumer trends such as flashpacking and adventure travel have led to a worldwide increase in socially connected photographers.

The proliferation of easy-to-use open source blogging methods, inexpensively-priced equipment and content management system applications has led to an increase in photography for social change and amateur photojournalism.

Some extensions of social photography include geotagging and online mapping, while online social networking destinations like Facebook have led to an increase in the popularity of technology employing the real-time transfer of images. Where Facebook allows for users to instantly upload a picture from their mobile phone to their profile, there have recently been a number of services sprouting up that allows users to create real time photo streams.

A wireless digital camera enables photographers to connect to cellular networks or other hotspots to share photos, print wirelessly and save photos directly to an image hosting website. Geographic areas serviced by outdoor WiFi networks permit extended applications for geocaching which can include the use of Global Positioning Systems and smartphones.

Some news networks and online broadcasters encourage viewers to send in photographs of live, breaking and current events, enabling citizen journalists and amateur photographers to participate in the news gathering process.

== See also ==
- Photojournalism
- Social networking
- Documentary photography
- Gallery Project
- Travel journal
- Image sharing
