= Norwegian Centre Against Racism =

Anti-racist organization in Norway

Coordinates: 59.913994°N 10.751212°E

The Norwegian Centre Against Racism or Anti-Racism Centre (NCAR; Norwegian: Antirasistisk Senter) is a non-governmental organization based in Oslo, Norway established in 1983. The organization’s main objective is to achieve a socially just society through the fight against racism and discrimination. The Centre works toward its objective through the documentation and prevention of racism, racism awareness, and the mobilization of the minority population in Norway.

== Main activities ==
The Norwegian Centre Against Racism consists of a political management structure and three main departments:

- Agenda X: An activity center for the minority youth population of Norway in which life skill workshops and summer camps are organized.
- JobbX: A free job application course for minorities between the ages 16 and 26 in Norway. The course teaches how to search for jobs, create a CV, fill out job applications, and interview skills.
- The Counseling Office: The office offers counseling to those who have experienced ethnic and racial discrimination.

== Other involvement ==
=== The Jewish community of Oslo et al. v. Norway and the Case against Tore Tvedt ===
On August 19, 2000, the 'Bootboys', a Norwegian Extremist Group organized a march in Askim to commemorate Rudolf Hess, a Nazi leader. Terje Sjolie headed the march and gave a speech honouring Hess. The following year, Sjolie was charged by the Division Attorney of Oslo for violating section 135a of the Norwegian Penal Code. When appealed, the Supreme Court found that the prohibition of Nazism to be against the right to freedom of speech. The Norwegian Centre Against Racism and Jewish organizations appealed the verdict to the United Nations Committee on the Elimination of Racial Discrimination (CERD) stated the verdict violated articles four and six of the ICERD Convention. The CERD Committee concluded that Sjolie's statements violated the articles and it should not be protected under Norwegian freedom of speech. In relation to the court case and the Centre's appeal, in 2006, Tore Tvedt in an interview with Verdens Gang stated he wished to 'cleanse out the Jews', in addition to other anti-semitic statements. In response to the appeal of the Sjolie Case, the Norwegian Centre Against Racism and the Norwegian Jewish organizations took an effort to prevent a similar situation from occurring again despite the case being acquitted by the Borgarting Court of Appeals. Tore Tvedt received a forty five day sentence for his statements.

=== Tea Time ===
The Norwegian Centre Against Racism organized Tea Time as a community building project. Tea Time encourages Norwegian Muslims to invite their neighbours to their homes for tea to break down prejudices through the discussion of life experiences and asking questions to better understand one another. The Centre concluded the contact between the Muslim population and the 'native' Norwegian was on a downward slope and Tea Time would help create unity. The Norwegian government has helped fund the events and the Queen Sonja and Princess Mette-Marit of Norway have attended a Tea Time event as a solidarity pact with the project and its importance towards the unity of the Norwegian population. The results according to the Islamic Information Portal dictates that Tea Time has opened up 200 homes and within the first month, 300 events occurred. Negative attitudes towards Muslims in Norway as a result has fallen by 40%.

=== Migrant access to health care ===
In the 2015 Red Cross Report, the Norwegian Centre Against Racism and other humanitarian organizations, with the Norwegian Red Cross, submitted a joint appeal to the Norwegian government to give migrants access to healthcare. The appeal claims that the lack of healthcare to migrants is inconsistent with human rights principles.

=== NGO Alternative Report, 2015 ===
The NGO Alternative Report is a supplemental commentary by the Norwegian Centre Against Racism and eighteen other Norwegian non-governmental organizations; in response to Norway's twenty-first and twenty-second Periodic Report submitted under the ninth article of the International Convention on Elimination of All Forms of Racial Discrimination. The States Parties of the Convention committed to anti racist principles in many aspects of society, the ninth article requires agreeing States Parties to submit a report on 'the legislative, judicial, administrative or other measures which they have adopted and which give effect to the provisions of this Convention.' Through the NGO Alternative Report, each non-governmental organization contributed their expertise and research to recommend an implementation of various humanitarian policies from grounds of determination, legal aid, unaccompanied asylum seeking minors and other asylum seekers to the elimination of all racial discrimination in Norway's approach to the Convention's principles. The Norwegian Centre Against Racism addressed the issue of cells for solitary confinement. According to the European Committee for the Prevention of Torture stated the solitary confinement cells in prisons such as Trandum are 'unsuitable for detention of any kind.' In 2015, the Norwegian Centre Against Racism Trandum in which the cells were improved, however the organization criticized the prison's lack of mental health professionals to address the mental state of prisoners in order to prevent instances such as self-mutilation and suicide. Another case the Centre addressed within the Report was the twenty-first recommendation of hate speech and hate crimes. July 2011, Anders Behring Breivik, a far-right Norwegian terrorist committed the 2011 Norway attacks; the Norwegian Centre Against Racism documented an increase in attacks against visible minorities on the day as the terrorist was perpetuated as a person from Muslim descent. The report addressed the issue to further analyze of the relationship between Breivik, racism, Islamophobia, and Norway; to focus on right-wing extremism rather than resorting to race.

== Criticism ==
Negotiating Gender and Diversity in an Emergent European Public Sphere, written by Birte Siim, examines the ethno-cultural diversity through the feminist perspective. The author studies various 'about us' pages on non governmental organization websites to understand the organizations' scope on humanitarian issues. In reference to the Norwegian Centre Against Racism, Siim states the Centre has a limited indications of gender equality. The Centre prioritizes gender and ethnicity as relative issues; in addition, dignifies gender equality to be an issue for the European Union.

== Leadership ==
In 2015, Permanent Staff of the Professional Policy Department were as follows:

- Executive Vice President: Hatem Ben Mansour
- Deputy Chairman: Mari K. Linløkken
- Senior Adviser: Vivian Brattsti Sørensen
- Secretary: Fida Jeries Baarli
- Adviser: Maria Wasvik
