= International Reporter =

Norwegian non-governmental organisation

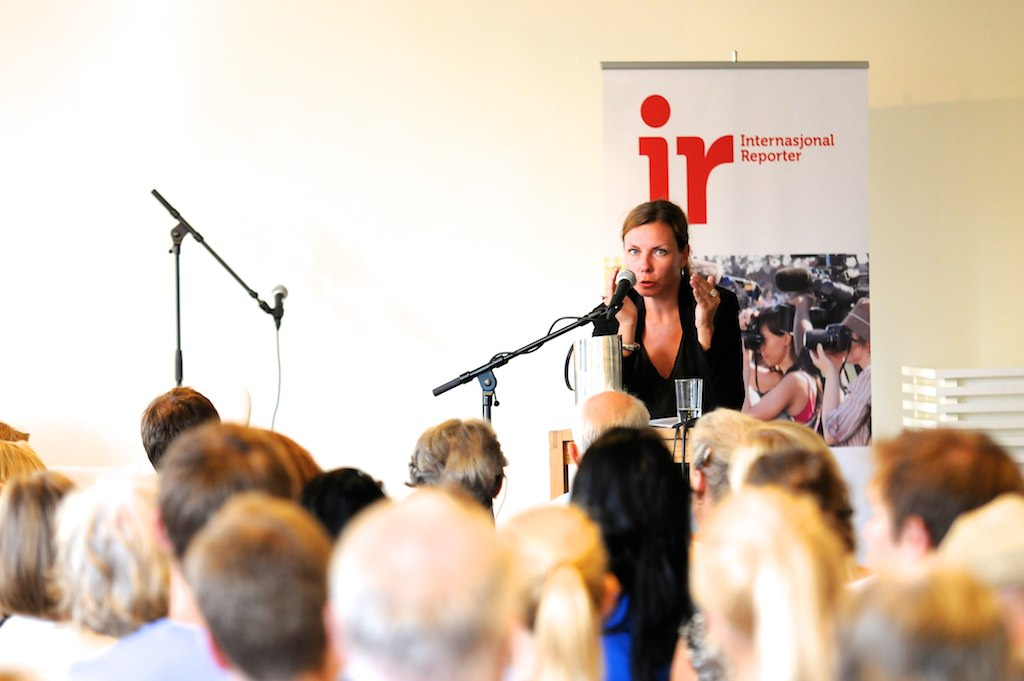
The Swedish journalist and author Terese Cristiansson, giving a speech about her reporting as a correspondent in Afghanistan. The seminar she participated in was arranged by the Norwegian NGO International Reporter and took place at The House of Literature in Oslo, Norway.

International Reporter (IR) (Norwegian: Internasjonal Reporter, IR) is a Norwegian non-governmental organisation, working to improve and expand Norwegian media coverage of Africa, Asia and Latin-America. It encourages journalistic cooperation across borders as well as the use of non-western sources.

The organization was established in 1987 as the Forum for Development Journalism by scholars at the Norwegian School of Journalism, researchers and journalists. The organisation's headquarters is in Oslo, Norway.

== Journalism Award ==
International Reporter’s Journalism Award recognizes a journalistic product which in an insightful, surprising and engaging way has shed light upon an international issue especially related to Africa, Asia or Latin-America.

The award was presented for the first time in 2010. It was then awarded to Inger Sunde and Harald Eraker for «Connecting people», a critical documentary about the mobile phone industry, that was aired on NRK Brennpunkt.

== International Resource Network ==
IR operates an English-language database called International Resource Network (IRN). It contains profiles of journalists, photojournalists, researchers, aid workers, field experts and information officers working in, or with matters that concern, the developing world. The main target group for IRN is Norwegian journalists, although the database could also be relevant for those working within development aid, business or organisations, and who seeks partners for cooperation or resource persons in countries in the south.
