= Halvor Fosli =

Norwegian writer and contributing editor

- Born: 30 August 1961 (age 65); Dalen, Telemark, Norway
- Occupations: Non-fiction writer journalist editor publisher

Halvor Fosli (born 30 August 1961) is a Norwegian non-fiction writer, journalist, magazine editor and publisher.

== Career ==
Fosli was born in Dalen, Telemark. He has been a journalist for the newspaper Dag og Tid. He made his literary debut in 1994 with a treatment of the Kristiania Bohemians, Kristianiabohemen. Byen, miljøet, menneska. Further books include Kvite kull og svarte får. Ingeniørar i norsk skjønnlitteratur from 1996 and Ute på prøve (1996). In 1995 he started the publishing house ExLex. From 2000 to 2005 he was editor of the literary magazine Prosa. Among his later books are Fremmed i eget land (2015), and Mot nasjonalt sammenbrudd (2020).
