= Paris attacks =

Paris attacks may refer to the following:

- 1941 Paris synagogue attacks, 2 and 3 October 1941
- Massacre of 14 July 1953 in Paris, by police, 14 July 1953
- Paris massacre of 1961, of Algerians by police, 17 October 1961
- 1962 Issy-les-Moulineaux bombing, by the OAS, 10 March 1962
- 1974 Paris café bombing, by the PFLP/Carlos the Jackal, 15 September 1974
- 1978 Palace of Versailles bombing, by the Breton Liberation Front, 26 June 1978
- 1980 Paris synagogue bombing, perhaps by Palestinian nationalists, 3 October 1980
- Turkish consulate attack in Paris, by Armenian militants, 24 September 1981
- April 1982 Paris car bombing, outside the offices of Lebanese newspaper Al-Watan al-Arabi, 22 April 1982
- Chez Jo Goldenberg restaurant attack, at a Jewish restaurant by the Abu Nidal Organisation, 9 August 1982
- September 1982 Paris car bombing, on an Israeli diplomat by the Lebanese Armed Revolutionary Factions, 17 September 1982
- 1983 Orly Airport attack, on Turkish Airlines check-in desk by Armenian militants, 15 July 1983
- Grand Véfour restaurant bombing, by unknown attackers, 23 December 1983
- European Space Agency bombing, by Action Directe, 3 August 1984
- February 1985 Paris bombing, on Marks & Spencer by Palestinian nationalists, 23 February 1985
- Rivoli Beaubourg cinema bombing, at a Jewish film festival by unknown attackers, 30 March 1985
- 1985–86 Paris attacks, perhaps instigated by Hezbollah, 7 December 1985–17 September 1986
- 1986 Paris police station attack, by Action Directe, 9 July 1986
- Attempted assassination of Alain Peyrefitte, by Action Directe, 15 December 1986
- Saint-Michel cinema attack, by Christian fundamentalists, 22 October 1988
- 1994 Paris shoot-out (the "Rey-Maupin Affair"), 4 October 1994
- 1995 France bombings, attacks on public transport by the GIA (Armed Islamic Group of Algeria), 25 July-17 October 1995
- 1996 Paris RER bombing, possibly by the GIA, 3 December 1996
- Attempted assassination of Jacques Chirac by Maxime Brunerie, 14 July 2002
- 2013 triple murder of Kurdish activists in Paris, 9-10 January 2013
- November 2013 Paris attacks (on BFM TV, Libération, Société Générale), 15 and 18 November 2013
- January 2015 Île-de-France attacks:
  - Charlie Hebdo shooting, 7 January 2015
  - Hypercacher Kosher Supermarket siege, 9 January 2015
- November 2015 Paris attacks, on the Bataclan Theatre etc., by Islamic terrorists, 13 November 2015
- January 2016 Paris police station attack, by an Islamic terrorist, 7 January 2016
- Louvre machete attack, 3 February 2017
- 2017 Orly Airport attack, 18 March 2017
- April 2017 Champs-Élysées attack, 20 April 2017
- Aubervilliers restaurant attack, 11 June 2017
- June 2017 Champs-Élysées car ramming attack, 19 June 2017
- 2017 Levallois-Perret attack, 9 August 2017, in the northwestern suburbs of Paris
- 2018 Paris knife attack, outside the Palais Garnier by an ISIL supporter, 12 May 2018
- Paris police headquarters stabbing, by a police employee, 3 October 2019
- 2020 Paris stabbing attack, outside the Charlie Hebdo headquarters, 25 September 2020
- 2022 Paris shooting, at a Kurdish cultural centre and café, 23 December 2022
- 2023 Paris attack, near Pont de Bir-Hakeim in Paris, 2 December 2023

== See also ==
- List of terrorist incidents in France
- 2015 France attacks (disambiguation)
- Battle of Paris (disambiguation)
- Siege of Paris (disambiguation)
