= List of terrorist incidents in France =

Terrorist incidents map of France (1970–2015). Paris, Corsica and Southwestern France are major places of incidents. A total of 2,616 incidents were plotted.

This is a list of terrorist attacks in France from 1800 to the present. Several 19th-century French rulers were targeted in unsuccessful assassination attempts which killed innocent bystanders.

Since 1970, France experienced 2,654 terrorist incidents, resulting in 1,247 terrorist-related deaths and 2,559 injuries, the second highest in western Europe after the United Kingdom. France remains the country most affected by Islamist terrorism within Europe, with recent data showcasing a total of 82 Islamist attacks and 332 deaths from 1979 to 2021.

== Background ==
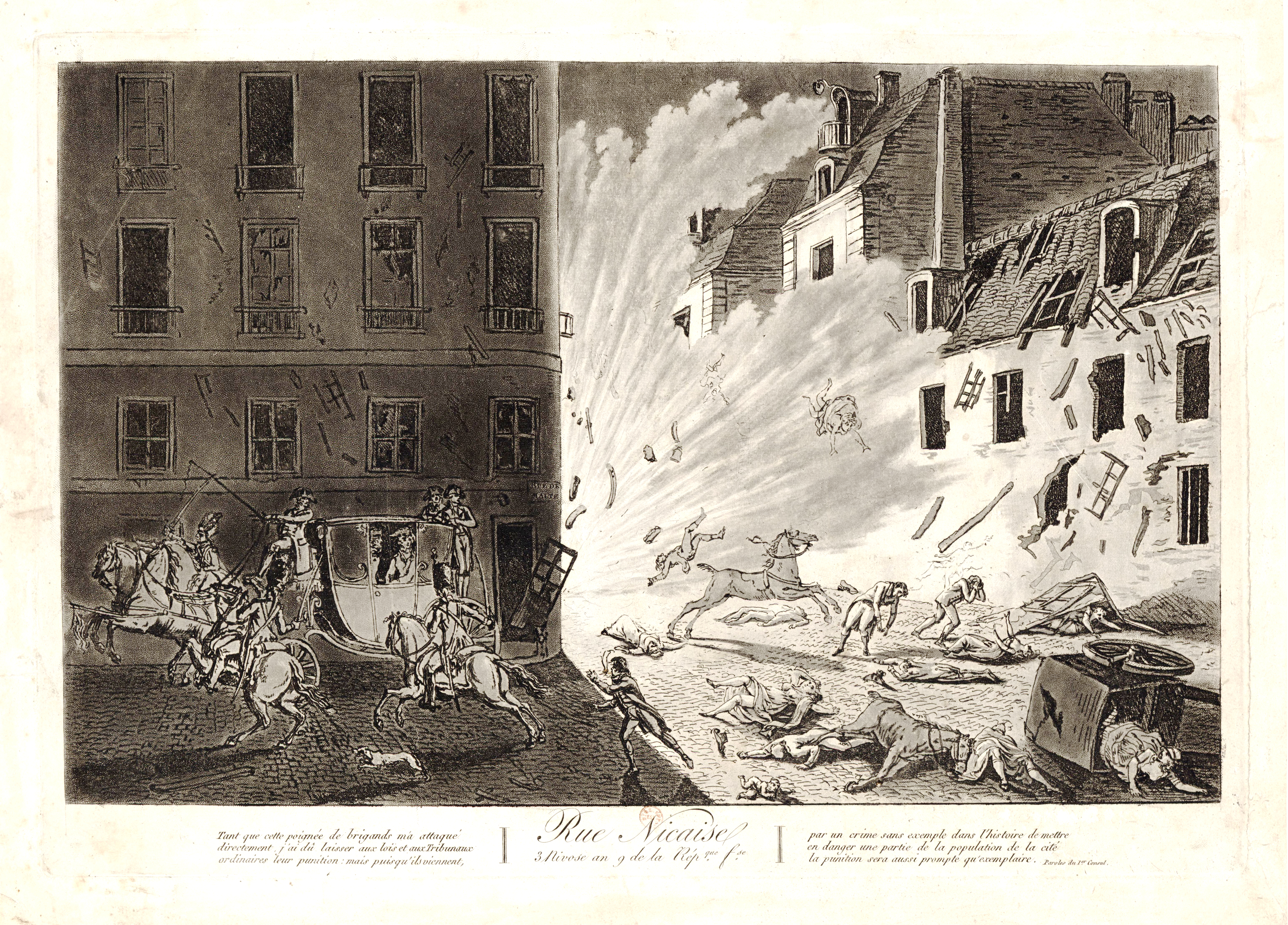
Etching of the December 1800 attack of the plot of the rue Saint-Nicaise

France has a lengthy history of terrorist attacks carried out by a variety of groups from the extreme right, extreme left, extreme Basque, Breton, Savoy and Corsican nationalists, Algerian insurgent groups and Islamist extremists. Most of the attacks have been bombings utilising improvised explosive devices (IEDs). Anarchists carried out a series of bombings and assassination attempts in the 19th century. A number of attacks associated with the Algerian War took place in the 1950s and 1960s, including the deadliest terrorist attack in France in the 20th century, the 1961 Vitry-Le-François train bombing carried out by the pro-colonialist French nationalist Organisation armée secrète.

Various Middle Eastern factions carried out shootings and bombings in the 1970s and 1980s, mainly in Paris, while during the Algerian Civil War of the 1990s, insurgents associated with the Armed Islamic Group (GIA) carried out a series of major attacks against the Paris public transport system. Nationalist extremists from the Basque, Breton and Corsican communities carried out a number of assassinations and targeted bomb attacks in the 1990s and 2000s. Islamist extremists have carried out numerous attacks in the 2010s, of which the November 2015 Paris attacks have been the bloodiest to date. Although 2015 has been the deadliest year so far in terms of fatalities caused by terrorist attacks, the number of separate terrorist attacks in previous years has been far higher. The highest number of attacks recorded in a single year was 270 in 1996, largely carried out by Algerian Civil War insurgents. The last year without any recorded terrorist attacks was 1971.

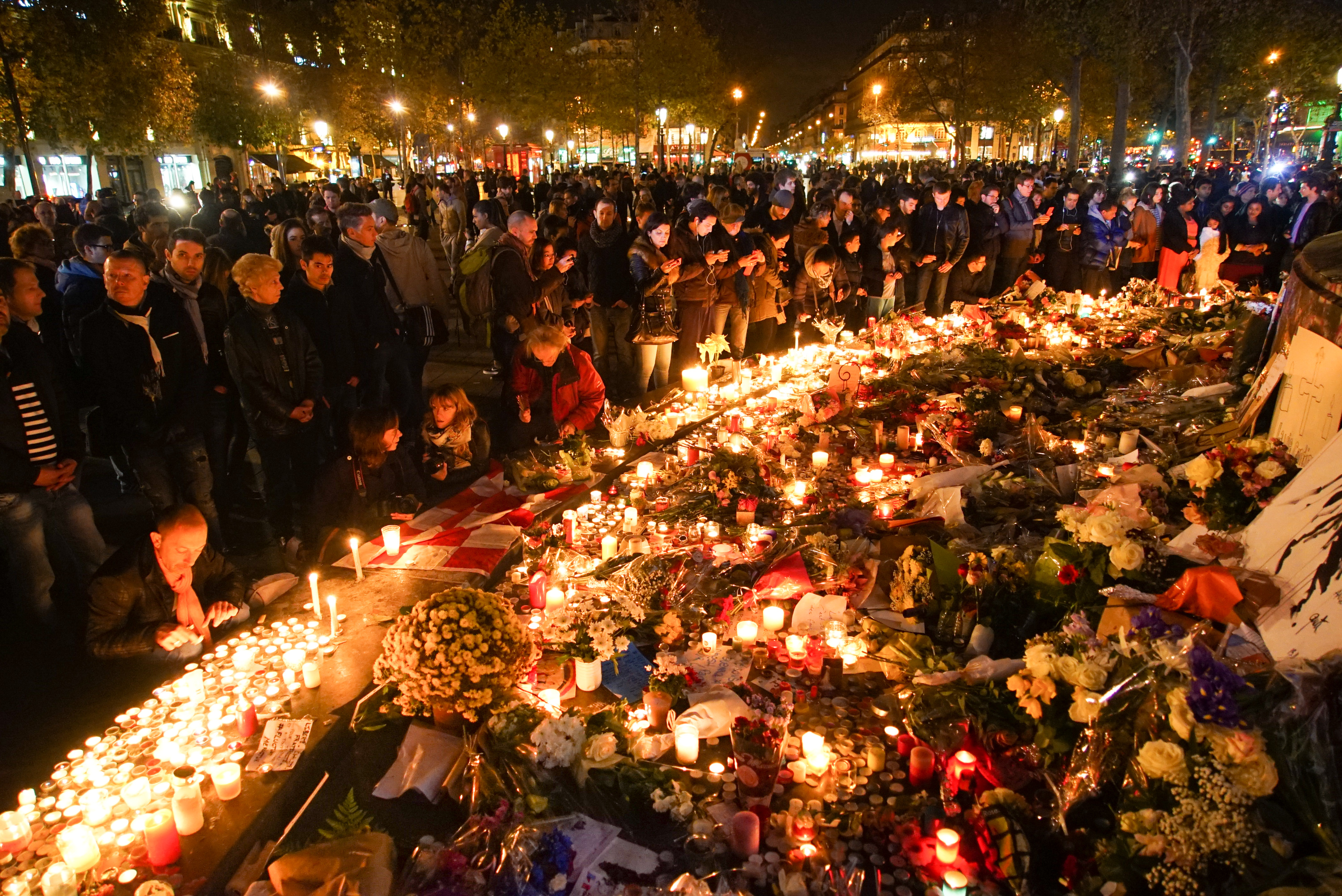
Dozens of mourning people captured during civil service in remembrance of November 2015 Paris attacks victims. Western Europe, France, Paris, place de la République, November 15, 2015

== List of incidents ==
Outside France, the terrorist attack with the most French victims was the 19 September 1989 bombing of UTA Flight 772 over Niger, in which 170 people died, 54 of them French citizens.

=== History ===
==== 19th century ====
Date	Type	Dead	Injured	Location and description
24 December 1800	Bombing	22	50+	Plot of the rue Saint-Nicaise, an unsuccessful attempt to assassinate Napoleon Bonaparte in Paris.
28 July 1835	Shooting	18	22	Unsuccessful attempt by Giuseppe Mario Fieschi to assassinate King Louis Philippe I using an "infernal device", essentially an improvised multi-barrelled gun.
14 January 1858	Bombing	8	106	Unsuccessful attempt by Italian nationalist Felice Orsini to assassinate Napoleon III.
8 November 1892	Bombing	5	0	The anarchist Émile Henry placed a bomb at the offices of the Carmaux Mining Company, killing five police officers after it was discovered and transported to a police station.
9 December 1893	Bombing	0	1	The anarchist Auguste Vaillant threw a home-made bomb into the French Chamber of Deputies from the public gallery, injuring one deputy.
12 February 1894	Bombing	1	20	French anarchist Émile Henry detonated a bomb at the Café Terminus in the Parisian Gare Saint-Lazare.
24 June 1894	Stabbing	1	0	Assassination of the President of the French Republic, Sadi Carnot by the Italian anarchist Sante Geronimo Caserio, in revenge for the execution of Vaillant.

==== 20th century ====
Date	Type	Dead	Injured	Location and description
31 July 1914	Shooting	1	0	Assassination of Jean Jaurès a socialist leader and a committed antimilitarist, at the outbreak of World War I, in a Parisian cafe, by a French nationalist Raoul Villain.
25 May 1926	Shooting	1	0	Assassination of Ukrainian nationalist Symon Petliura in Paris on rue Racine, by a Russian revolutionary Sholom Schwartzbard.
6 May 1932	Shooting	1	0	Assassination of the French president Paul Doumer at a book fair at the Hôtel Salomon de Rothschild in Paris, by a fascist Russian émigré Paul Gorguloff.
9 October 1934	Shooting	6	5	Assassination of Alexander I of Yugoslavia in Marseille, by a Bulgarian revolutionary Vlado Chernozemski.
23 January 1937	Stabbing	1	0	Assassination of Dimitri Navachine, former governor of the BCEN, a Soviet-controlled bank in Paris, by an extreme-right group La Cagoule.
9 June 1937	Shooting	2	0	Assassination of two Italian antifascists, the Rosseli Brothers (Nello and Carlo) by La Cagoule in Bagnoles-de-l'Orne, probably on the orders of Mussolini.
11 September 1937	Bombing	2	0	Bomb attack by La Cagoule against the Union des industries et métiers de la métallurgie and the "Confédération générale du patronat français" to create the impression of a communist conspiracy.
15 September 1958	Shooting	1	3	Unsuccessful attempt by the Algerian National Liberation Front (FLN) to assassinate the French Information Minister Jacques Soustelle on the Place de l'Etoile in Paris.
18 June 1961	Bombing	28	100+	1961 Vitry-Le-François train bombing carried out by the French-Algerian anti-secession paramilitary Organisation armée secrète (OAS), which caused a fast Strasbourg–Paris train to derail; the worst terrorist attack in French history before the 21st century.
8 September 1961	Shooting	0	0	An OAS gang controlled by Raoul Salan fired a plastic charge at the car of French president Charles de Gaulle.
22 January 1962	Bombing	1	12	Bomb attack against the Quai d'Orsay, carried out by the OAS.
9 March 1962	Bombing	3	47	1962 Issy-les-Moulineaux bombing: Car bomb attack in Issy-les-Moulineaux, carried out by the OAS.
22 August 1962	Shooting	0	0	Unsuccessful assassination attempt on the president by Jean Bastien-Thiry, likely on behalf of the OAS. Charles de Gaulle's presidential motorcade was raked by machine-gun fire in a Paris suburb called Petit-Clamart. The rear window shattered, and two tires burst, but De Gaulle and his wife escaped unharmed.
9 May 1970	Bombing	0	0	Besançon courthouse attack : bomb attack in Besançon, carried out by the UDR/SAC
14 December 1973	Bombing	4	20	1973 Algerian consulate bombing in Marseille: Bomb attack against the Algerian consulate in Marseille by the far-right Charles Martel Group.
28 July 1974	Bombing	0	12	Bomb attack against the Spanish consulate in Toulouse by Internationalist Revolutionary Action Groups (GARI).
15 September 1974	Bombing	2	34	Grenade attack on the Drugstore Saint-Germain-des-Prés, allegedly by Carlos the Jackal.
13–19 January 1975	RPG attack	0	24	Two failed rocket propelled grenade attacks on El Al airplanes at Orly Airport by Carlos the Jackal and Black September.
9 March 1975	Bombing	1	6	Bomb attack in the Gare de l'Est, Paris.
31 July 1975	Hostage taking	1	2	Hostage taking at the Iraqi embassy in Paris, carried out by the Palestine Liberation Organization (PLO).
24 October 1975	Shooting	2	0	A group of Armenian militants ambushed the car of Turkish Ambassador İsmail Erez killing him and his chauffeur. Both ASALA and JCAG claimed responsibility.
18 October 1977	Shooting	1	0	A Red Army Faction commando shoots and kills German industrialist Hanns Martin Schleyer near the city of Mulhouse. Another commando had kidnapped Schleyer in Cologne, Germany, on 5 September 1977, killing his driver and three police officers.
11 May 1978	Bombing	0	0	Bomb attack carried out by members of the separatist National Liberation Front of Corsica against an Air France Boeing 707 while it was on the ground at Ajaccio Napoleon Bonaparte Airport in Corsica.
20 May 1978	Shooting	4	5	Three terrorists open fire on El Al passengers in the departure lounge of Orly Airport south of Paris.
26 June 1978	Bombing	0	1	1978 Palace of Versailles bombing: Two Breton terrorists cause significant damage to pieces of art at the Palace of Versailles near Paris with a bomb.
3 August 1978	Shooting	2	0	Assassination of the PLO representative in Paris, Izz al-Din al-Kalak and one of his assistants, by the Abu Nidal Organization.
2 December 1978	Bombing	1	25	A bomb attack kills one at the Bazar de l'Hôtel de Ville in Paris. Nobody claimed responsibility.
27 March 1979	Bombing	0	32	Bomb attack against a university restaurant in a Jewish student hostel in Paris claimed by an Anti-Zionist group.
7 December 1979	Shooting	1	0	Assassination of Shahriar Shafiq, a former Imperial Navy Captain of Iran, in Paris on the Rue Pergolese where he was in exile. Ayatollah Khalkhali claimed that the assassination was carried out by one of his death squads. The Muslim Liberation Group announced that it was responsible for the assassination.
23 December 1979	Shooting	1	0	Assassination of Turkish attaché for tourism in France, Yılmaz Çolpan on the Champs Elysées by the JCAG.
17 January 1980	Shooting	1	0	Assassination of the director of the Palestinian library-shop in Paris, Yusef Mubarak, by the Abu Nidal Organization.
29 January 1980	Bombing	1	8	Bomb attack against the Syrian Embassy in Paris.
11 June 1980	Bombing	0	12	Bomb attack in the west terminal of Orly Airport, claimed by the far-left group Action directe.
21 July 1980	Shooting	1	0	Assassination of former Prime Minister of Syria, Salah al-Bitar in his newspaper office in Paris.
5 August 1980	Shooting	2	11	1980 Turkish Consulate attack in Lyon, carried out by the Armenian Secret Army for the Liberation of Armenia (ASALA).
3 October 1980	Bombing	4	46	1980 Paris synagogue bombing against the synagogue of the French Israeli Liberal Union on rue Copernic, Paris.
4 March 1981	Shooting	2	1	Assassination of the Turkish Labour Attaché, Reşat Moralı, and the Religious Affairs Officer in the Turkish Embassy, Tecelli Arı by two gunmen of ASALA in Paris.
16 April 1981	Bombing	1	8	Bomb attack at Ajaccio airport shortly after the arrival of French President Valéry Giscard d'Estaing.
29 August 1981	Bombing	0	15	Bomb attack by a Palestinian group in the Intercontinental Hotel in Paris.
24–25 September 1981	Hostage taking	1	2	1981 Turkish consulate attack in Paris, carried out by ASALA.
18 January 1982	Shooting	1	0	Assassination of the United States Assistant Army Attaché (Charles R. Ray), carried out by the Lebanese Armed Revolutionary Faction.
29 March 1982	Bombing	5	29	1982 Capitole bombing: Bomb attack against the "Capitole" train between Paris and Toulouse, attributed to Carlos the Jackal.
3 April 1982	Shooting	1	0	Assassination of an Israeli embassy advisor (Yaacov Barsimentov) in Paris, carried out by the Lebanese Armed Revolutionary Faction.
22 April 1982	Bombing	1	60	April 1982 Paris car bombing: Car bomb attack outside the Parisian offices of anti-Syrian newspaper Al-Watan Al-Arabi, attributed to Carlos the Jackal.
21 July 1982	Bombing	0	15	Bomb attack in a terrace café on the Place Saint-Michel in Paris, carried out by ASALA.
9 August 1982	Shooting	6	22	Goldenberg restaurant attack on the Rue des Rosiers in Paris, attributed to the Abu Nidal Organization (ANO).
17 September 1982	Bombing	0	51	September 1982 Paris car bombing: Bomb attack against an Israeli diplomat in front of the Israeli consulate and the Lycée Carnot, claimed by FARL and Action directe.
28 February 1983	Bombing	1	4	Bomb attack in an office of the travel agency Marmara in Paris, carried out by ASALA.
15 July 1983	Bombing	8	56	1983 Orly Airport attack, carried out by ASALA.
30 September 1983	Bombing	1	26	1983 Marseille exhibition bombing: Bomb attack during the Marseille International Fair Trade. Action directe, FARL, ASALA and Commando Delta claimed responsibility.
23 December 1983	Bombing	0	12	Grand Véfour restaurant bombing: Bombing of an upmarket restaurant in Paris.
31 December 1983	Bombing	5	13	TGV train and Marseille station bombings: Bombing of a TGV fast train between Marseille and Paris and the Saint Charles train station in Marseille, attributed to Carlos the Jackal.
3 May 1984	Bombing	0	13	Alfortville Armenian Genocide Memorial bombings
7 February 1984	Shooting	2	1	Assassination of Gholam Ali Oveisi, a former military governor of Tehran, and his brother in Paris where they were in exile. The Islamic Jihad claimed responsibility.
8 February 1984	Shooting	1	0	Assassination of the United Arab Emirates' ambassador to France, Khalifa Abdel Aziz al-Mubarak on a Paris street, attributed to the Abu Nidal Organization (ANO).
22 April 1984	Bombing	0	1	Sonauto and Sony-France bombings damaged buildings owned by companies importing Japanese goods, attributed to 'anarchist group' to protest 'a death sentence passed against a fellow anarchist in Japan.'
2 August 1984	Bombing	0	6	Bombing of the European Space Agency headquarters in Paris, by Action directe.
11 November 1984	Shooting	2	5	1984 Châteaubriant shooting: A far-right extremist killed two Turkish workers and wounded five others.
25 January 1985	Shooting	1	0	Assassination of René Audran, senior official of the French Ministry of Defence, by Action directe.
23 February 1985	Bombing	1	14	February 1985 Paris bombing: Bomb attack against the Marks & Spencer store in boulevard Haussmann, ordered by the 15 May Organization.
29 March 1985	Bombing	0	18	Rivoli Beaubourg cinema bombing: Bomb attack against the Rivoli Beaubourg cinema in Paris during a Jewish film festival.
25 September 1985	Shooting	4	1	Monbar Hotel attack in Bayonne, in which four members of ETA who police believed to be senior figures in the organisation were killed by the Grupos Antiterroristas de Liberación (GAL).
7 December 1985	Bombing	0	43	Double bomb attack against the Printemps Haussmann store in Paris, attributed to the Hezbollah.
3–5 February 1986	Bombings	1	35	Three bomb attacks in 3 days against Paris's Claridge Hotel on the Champs-Élysées, a bookshop on the Place Saint-Michel and a Fnac store on Les Halles by the CSPPA and Hezbollah.
20 March 1986	Bombing	2	29	Bomb attack against the Point Show gallery on the Champs-Élysées by the CSPPA and Hezbollah.
9 July 1986	Bombing	1	21	1986 Paris police station attack: Bombing of the Brigade de répression du banditisme office in Paris, by Action directe.
5–15 September 1986	Bombings	5	131	Four bomb attacks, against a post office in the Hôtel de Ville, a Casino caféteria in La Défense, a restaurant on the Champs-Élysées and an office in the Préfecture de police by the CSPPA and Hezbollah.
17 September 1986	Bombing	7	55	Bomb attack against the Tati store on rue de Rennes in Paris, attributed to the CSPPA and Hezbollah.
17 November 1986	Shooting	1	0	Assassination of Georges Besse, CEO of Renault, by Action directe.
22 October 1988	Arson	0	14	1988 attack on Saint-Michel cinema in Paris carried out by an integrist Catholic group to protest against the showing of The Last Temptation of Christ.
24 December 1994	Hijacking	4 (+3)	25	Hijacking of Air France Flight 8969 by members of the Armed Islamic Group (GIA).
July–October 1995	Bombings	8	140+	1995 Paris Métro and RER bombings, 8 bomb attacks carried out by the Armed Islamic Group.
3 December 1996	Bombing	4	170	1996 Paris Métro bombing. Bomb attack against the RER B Gare de Port-Royal in Paris, attributed to the Armed Islamic Group.
8 February 1998	Shooting	1	0	Assassination of Claude Érignac, prefect of Corsica, by Corsican nationalists.
16 February 1999	Hostage Taking	0	0	Hostage taking at the Kenya Embassy in Paris attributed to Kurdish protesters. This was in response to the Kenyan government deporting Kurdistan Workers' Party (PKK) leader Abdullah Öcalan, who was wanted in Turkey on terrorism charges. No casualties were reported.
19 April 2000	Bombing	1	0	Bomb attack against a branch of McDonald's in Quévert, Brittany, attributed to extreme Breton nationalists.

==== 21st century ====
Date	Type	Dead	Injured	Location and description
20 July 2003	Bombing	0	16	2003 Nice bombing: Double attack against the regional directorates of customs and the treasury in Nice, claimed by the National Liberation Front of Corsica (FLNC).
8 October 2004	Bombing	0	10	Bomb attack against the Indonesian Embassy in Paris, claimed by the Armed French Islamic Front
1 December 2007	Shooting	2	0	Killing of two members of the Spanish Civil Guard carrying out surveillance against ETA members in Capbreton, Landes.
16 March 2010	Shooting	1	0	A French policeman was shot dead by members of ETA when he stopped their car at a routine checkpoint at Dammarie Les Lys, outside of Paris.
11 March 2012–22 March 2012	Shooting	7	5	Toulouse and Montauban shootings, murders of three French paratroopers, and a French Rabbi and three French schoolchildren (aged eight, six and three), carried out over a period of 11 days by Mohammed Merah.
9 January 2013– 10 January 2013	Shooting	3	0	Triple Murder of Kurdish Activists in Paris. During the night of January 9, 2013, three Kurdish women's activists, Fidan Doğan, 28, Sakine Cansız, 54, (who is the co-founder of the PKK), and Leyla Şaylemez, 24, were murdered execution style at the Centre d'Information sur le Kurdistan. French authorities arrested Ömer Güney for the murders. Güney died of a brain tumor in 2016 while in prison, however, in May 2019, French police reopened investigations into the murders due to speculation of Turkish government involvement in the killings.
25 May 2013	Stabbing	0	1	2013 La Défense attack by an Islamist knifeman against a French soldier in the Paris suburb of La Défense.
20 December 2014	Stabbing	0 (+1)	3	2014 Tours police station stabbing. A man yelling "Allahu Akbar" attacked a police office in Joué-lès-Tours with a knife. He was killed and 3 police officers were injured.
21 December 2014	Vehicle ramming	0	13	2014 Dijon attack: A man yelling "Allahu Akbar" ran over and injured 13 pedestrians in five parts of the city Dijon. He also reportedly said he was "acting for the children of Palestine".
7 January 2015–9 January 2015	Shooting	17 (+3)	22	January 2015 Île-de-France attacks, 8 cartoonists, 2 guests, and two police officers are murdered at the satirical magazine Charlie Hebdo office in Paris, carried out by Saïd and Chérif Kouachi, two Islamist gunmen who identified themselves as belonging to Al-Qaeda in Yemen. During this period, a third Islamist gunman and close friend of the Kouachi brothers, Amedy Coulibaly was responsible for two shootings and an hostage taking at a Hypercacher kosher market. He said he synchronized his attacks with the Kouachi brothers. Coulibaly had pledged allegiance to the Islamic State.
3 February 2015	Stabbing	0	3	3 military men, guarding a Jewish community center in Nice, are attacked by Moussa Coulibaly (not related to the January Coulibaly attacks).
19 April 2015	Shooting	1	0 (+1)	Unsuccessful attack against 2 churches in Villejuif by an Algerian jihadist. He killed a woman probably when trying to steal her car but accidentally shot himself in the leg, putting an end to his plans.
26 June 2015	Beheading	1	2	Saint-Quentin-Fallavier attack. An Islamist delivery driver probably linked to ISIS decapitated a man and rammed a company van into gas cylinders at the Air Products' gas factory in an attempt to blow up the building.
21 August 2015	Shooting and stabbing	0	3 (+1)	2015 Thalys train attack. An attempted mass shooting occurred on a train traveling from Amsterdam to Paris. Four people were injured, including the assailant who was subdued by other passengers.
13 November 2015–14 November 2015	Shootings, hostage taking and suicide bombings	131 (+7)	413	November 2015 Paris attacks. The single deadliest terrorist attack in French history. Multiple shooting and grenade attacks occurred on a Friday night; among the locations targeted were a music venue, sports stadium and several bar and restaurant terraces. Ninety persons were killed during a siege at an Eagles of Death Metal concert inside the Bataclan. French president François Hollande evacuated from a football match between France and Germany at the Stade de France, venue for the UEFA Euro 2016 Final, after three separate suicide bombings over the course of about 40 minutes. ISIS claimed responsibility for the attacks and President Hollande named the Paris attacks an "'act of war'".
1 January 2016	Vehicle ramming	0	2	A man rammed his car twice into 4 soldiers protecting a mosque in Valence. He said he wanted to kill troops and jihadi propaganda images were found on his computer. A soldier and a civilian suffered minor injuries, while the other 3 troops were uninjured.
7 January 2016	Stabbing	0 (+1)	0	January 2016 Paris police station attack, a jihadist wearing a fake explosive belt attacked police officers in the Goutte d'Or district in Paris with a meat cleaver, while shouting "Allahu Akbar". He was shot dead and one policeman receiving injuries. The ISIS flag and a clearly written claim in Arabic, were found on the attacker.
13 June 2016	Stabbing	2 (+1)	0	2016 Magnanville stabbing, a police officer and his wife, a police secretary, were stabbed to death in their home in Magnanville by a jihadist. ISIS claimed responsibility.
14 July 2016	Vehicle ramming	86 (+1)	434	A 19-tonne cargo truck was deliberately driven into crowds celebrating Bastille Day on the Promenade des Anglais in Nice. The driver was Mohamed Lahouaiej-Bouhlel, a Tunisian resident of France. The attack ended following an exchange of gunfire, during which Lahouaiej-Bouhlel was shot and killed by police.
26 July 2016	Stabbing	1 (+2)	1	2016 Normandy church attack, two terrorists attacked a church during a mass, killing an 86-year-old priest. ISIS claimed responsibility.
3 February 2017	Stabbing	0	1 (+1)	2017 Paris machete attack. A soldier near the Louvre museum opened fire on a man who attempted to enter the museum with a machete. The man was shouting "Allahu Akbar" and injured the soldier's scalp.
16 March 2017	Letter bomb	0	1	A letter bomb probably sent by Greek anarchist organization Conspiracy of Cells of Fire exploded at the French office of the IMF injuring one person.
18 March 2017	Shooting	0 (+1)	2	2017 Orly Airport attack. A policeman was shot and injured in the Paris suburb of Garges-les-Gonesse by an attacker who was later shot dead at Orly Airport near Paris after trying to grab a soldier's rifle.
20 April 2017	Shooting	1 (+1)	3	April 2017 Champs-Élysées attack. An Islamist opened fire on police officers on the Champs-Élysées. ISIS claimed responsibility.
6 June 2017	Melee attack	0	1 (+1)	2017 Notre Dame attack. An Algerian Islamist attacked a police officer with a hammer in front of Notre-Dame de Paris. He was shot by a second policeman and arrested. He had pledged allegiance to ISIS.
19 June 2017	Vehicle ramming	0 (+1)	0	June 2017 Champs-Élysées car ramming attack. A jihadist rammed his car into a police car. He was killed and the Department of Interior stated that explosives, AKM assault rifle and handguns have been found in his car. The attacker had pledged allegiance to ISIS.
9 August 2017	Vehicle ramming	0	7 (+1)	2017 Levallois-Perret attack. A man rammed his car into soldiers near their barracks outside Paris. He was arrested on the highway after a shootout.
15 September 2017	Melee attack	0	2	A man sought by police who are investigating a possible terrorist motive attacked two women with a hammer in Chalon-sur-Saône near Lyon about 15 minutes apart, by a man shouting in Arabic. Earlier a knife-wielding man attacked and was stopped by an anti-terrorist soldier on patrol in Paris Metro train station without injury.
1 October 2017	Stabbing	2 (+1)	0	2017 Marseille stabbing. A man stabbed to death a 20-year-old woman and a 17-year-old girl at Marseille-Saint-Charles station. Attacker was shot dead. He was heard shouting 'Allahu Akbar'. ISIS claimed responsibility.
23 March 2018	Shooting, hostage taking	4 (+1)	15	Carcassonne and Trèbes attack. A gunman affiliated with ISIS attacked and stole a car in Carcassonne, killing the passenger and wounding the driver. He arrived in Trèbes and shot at a group of police officers who were jogging. Then, he attacked a supermarket, where three people were killed and several others were injured.
1 May 2018	Arson	0	0	Militants set fire to two La Poste vehicles along Rue Galilee in Bouguenais, Pays de la Loire, France. There were no reported casualties in the attack. Action Directe Anarchiste (ADA) claimed responsibility for the attack.
12 May 2018	Stabbing	1 (+1)	4	2018 Paris knife attack. A Chechnyan-born French Muslim, armed with a knife, killed one pedestrian and injured several more near the Garnier Opera in Paris before being fatally shot by police.
30 June 2018	Bomb plot	0	0	Asadollah Asadi, an Iranian diplomat, was sentenced to 20 years in prison for attempting to plant a bomb at an opposition rally in Paris.
11 December 2018	Shooting and stabbing	5 (+1)	11	2018 Strasbourg attack. A gunman opened fire just outside the Strasbourg Christmas Market, killing 5 and injuring 11. Killed in a gunfight with security forces two days later.
5 March 2019	Stabbing	0 (+1)	2 (+1)	An inmate at the high-security Condé-sur-Sarthe penitentiary stabbed two prison guards. The attack was described as a terrorist incident by French Interior Minister.
24 May 2019	Bombing	0	14	2019 Lyon bombing. A package bomb packed with nails exploded in a centre city shopping district of Lyon, President Macron has called it an "attack." The attacker had pledged allegiance to the Islamic State.
3 October 2019	Stabbing	4 (+1)	1	Paris police headquarters stabbing. A man who worked at Paris' police headquarters stabbed four of his colleagues to death. The counter-terrorism head said that the attacker had radical and extremist religious views.
3 January 2020	Stabbing	1 (+1)	2	2020 Villejuif stabbing. A man stabbed three people in Villejuif, a suburb of Paris, killing one person and wounding two others. The attacker was shot dead by police. The attacker was identified as Nathan C, a follower of salafism, an extremist sect of Islam.
5 January 2020	Attempted stabbing	0	0 (+1)	French police on Sunday shot and wounded a man who had rushed toward a group of policemen with a knife shouting “Allahu akbar” in the eastern city of Metz. The suspect was on an official list of those monitored for links to militant groups.
3 February 2020	Stabbing	0	1	In Metz, a police officer was injured when stabbed by an Islamic State sympathiser.
4 April 2020	Stabbing	2	5	2020 Romans-sur-Isère knife attack. On April 4, 2020, Two people were killed and five wounded in a knife attack, in what the interior minister called a terrorist incident. Prosecutors said the suspect was a Sudanese refugee in his 30s who lived in Romans-sur-Isère the town of the attack.
27 April 2020	Vehicle Ramming	0	2	Two police officers were seriously injured when a driver rammed his vehicle into them in Colombes, Hauts-de-Seine. The perpetrator was arrested, and a source stated that the man carried out the attack to "avenge events in Palestine". The attacker had pledged allegiance to Islamic State.
25 September 2020	Stabbing	0	2	2020 Paris stabbing attack. Four people were wounded (two serious), after a male attacked them with a butcher knife outside of the old Charlie Hebdo magazine headquarters. The magazine had just re-published the magazine cover which sparked a similar, more brutal attack in 2015. French police have arrested two suspects and a terrorism inquiry has been launched.
16 October 2020	Beheading	1 (+1)	0	A Chechen refugee beheaded Samuel Paty in Éragny-sur-Oise, northwest of Paris. Paty was a middle school teacher who had recently held a class on freedom of speech in which he showed caricatures of the Muslim prophet Mohammed.
29 October 2020	Stabbing	3	0	2020 Nice stabbing, 3 were killed in Notre-Dame de Nice.
31 October 2020	Shooting	0	1	A Greek Orthodox priest was seriously wounded when an assailant shot at him in Lyon.
17 March 2021	Stabbing	0	1	An elderly man standing outside a Church had his throat slit by a knife wielding assailant.
23 April 2021	Stabbing	1(+1)	0	A French policewoman was stabbed to death outside a police station in Rambouillet. The attacker shouted 'allahu akbar' as he carried out the attack and was shot dead by French authorities. The attacker was aged 37 and was Tunisian-born. French president, Emmanuel Macron stated that France would 'never give in to Islamic extremism' in response to the attack.
28 May 2021	Stabbing and shooting	0(+1)	3	A French policewoman was critically injured after she was stabbed multiple times in the city of Nantes. The perpetrator was known to be a man in his 40s, called Ndiaga Dieye. After he stabbed the policewoman, he stole her pistol and fled the scene but was eventually found by French gendarmes, leading to a shootout in which two gendarmes were injured. The assailant was shot dead by French gendarmes. The assailant was known to authorities as a radical Islamist and had only been released from prison in March, 2021.
22 November 2022		0	1	A 22-year-old man known to authorities as a radical Islamist attacked a police officer by shouting Allah Akbar while in police custody at the Annecy police station, he was indicted for "willful violence against a person holding public authority, in relation with a terrorist enterprise". The National Anti-Terrorist Prosecutor's Office is seized.
23 December 2022	Shooting	3	3(+1)	2022 Paris shooting. A 69-year-old man, identified only as William M, shot 3 people to death and injured 3 others in three locations in Paris's 10th Arrondissement near the Ahmet-Kaya Cultural Center, in an act that was confessed to have been motivated by anti-Kurdish and far-right sentiments. The attacker had previously been arrested for carrying out violence against refugees. Among the killed were a man who frequented Ahmet-Kaya, Mîr Perwer a Kurdish singer who was declared refugee due to his participation in the Peoples' Democratic Party (Turkey), and Emine Kara, a Kurdish rights activist who previously fought with Rojava against the Islamic State, and had been preparing a demonstration in remembrance of three Kurdish activists who had been murdered in the 10th arrondissement almost 10 years prior. The shooting sparked large protests.
13 October 2023	Stabbing	1	3	Arras school stabbing. A teacher was killed, and three others were seriously wounded in a knife attack at the Gambetta-Carnot secondary school in Arras. The attacker is of Chechen origin and known to the security services for his involvement with Islamist extremism.
3 December 2023	Stabbing	1	2	A 26-year-old French-Iranian man attacks passers-by in the 15th arrondissement of Paris. The assailant is said to have shouted "Allah Akbar", and to have had psychiatric problems and a history of terrorism.
22 February 2025	Stabbing	1	7	2025 Mulhouse stabbing attack. A 37-year-old Algerian man stabbed and killed a 69-year-old Portuguese man in the French city of Mulhouse. The suspect was on a terrorism watch list and the local prosecutor labeled the stabbing as a terrorist attack.
5 November 2025	Vehicle-ramming	0	5	The perpetrator drove a car into pedestrians and cyclists on Ochre Street in Dolus-d'Oléron. He then tried to set the car on fire with a gas canister inside, but he was arrested while shouting "Allahu Akbar". The perpetrator was 35 years old and from a nearby village. He was detained and is under investigation for attempted murder and terrorism related charges. French parliamentarian Joëlle Mélin identified the 22-year-old as Emma Vallain, an aide to National Rally right-wing politician Pascal Markowsky. Vallain was critically injured and received treatment at a local hospital. The suspect is believed to be 35 year-old Jean G., who stated that he had recently discovered Islam and that Allah had entrusted him with a mission. He was already known to police for drug trafficking, violence, and property damage. He had two prior convictions for theft and traffic offenses. In the village, he was also known for his alcohol and drug use. His understanding of religion remains unclear. Indeed, the suspect recently converted to Islam and told investigators he acted "in the name of Allah." Religious texts were also found at his home. However, the driver had contacted the parish of Oléron in September with the intention of being baptized. The man, who admitted to deliberately running down five people, "said he regretted his actions" at the end of his police custody. During his detention, the unemployed suspect, who had no children, explained that he had "followed the orders of Allah," "without any outside help," and that he had "wanted to die by self-immolation." The prosecutor of La Rochelle explained at a press conference that he had initially turned to Catholicism before converting to Islam, specifying that at this stage, there was "no jihadist dimension" to his actions. Described as a polydrug user, the man in his thirties was under the influence of cannabis at the time of the incident. His initial psychiatric evaluation while in custody revealed an "impairment," but not a "complete absence," of his judgment.
13 February 2026	Stabbing	0(+1)	1	A man known to authorities attempted to stab French officers during a ceremony at the Arc de Triomphe. An officer sustained light wounds from the assailant before another officer shot the assailant. France's national anti-terrorism prosecutor's office said the assailant died of his wounds after being taken to hospital. The assailant was released from prison in December 2025 after serving 12 years for attempted murders in connection with a terrorist enterprise against three police officers at a train station in the Belgian city of Molenbeek, Brussels in 2012.

Terrorist incidents in France since 1970
Year	Number of incidents	Deaths	Injuries
2021	3	1	4
2020	9	7	14
2019	3	4	16
2018	3	10	30
2017	9	3	16
2016	12	89	451
2015	36	161	446
2014	14	1	15
2013	12	0	5
2012	65	7	8
2011	8	0	4
2010	3	1	0
2009	9	0	11
2008	13	0	1
2007	16	3	8
2006	34	1	3
2005	33	0	11
2004	11	0	10
2003	34	0	21
2002	32	0	4
2001	21	0	16
2000	28	4	1
1999	46	0	2
1998	12	1	0
1997	130	0	4
1996	270	18	114
1995	71	19	177
1994	97	7	22
1993	7	0	0
1992	126	9	12
1991	137	6	5
1990	30	3	3
1989	25	3	2
1988	54	6	19
1987	87	5	8
1986	95	25	306
1985	107	17	83
1984	145	15	57
1983	121	19	179
1982	62	17	143
1981	66	8	78
1980	94	20	74
1979	412	11	41
1978	59	21	17
1977	53	3	7
1976	58	7	10
1975	39	3	25
1974	29	3	32
1973	14	4	20
1972	9	1	0
1971	0	0	0
1970	0	0	0
Total	2,979	448	1,779
