= Marseille explosion =

Marseille explosion may refer to several explosions in the city of Marseille, France:

- 1944 explosion of munitions in the Fort Saint-Jean (Marseille)
- 1973 Algerian consulate bombing in Marseille, by the Charles Martel Group
- 1983 Marseille exhibition bombing, attack near the American and Algerian stands at an international fair
- 1983 TGV train and Marseille station bombings by Carlos the Jackal
- 2023 Marseille building collapse, perhaps from a gas leak
