= Bombing of Marseille =

Bombing of Marseille may refer to:

- Italian aerial bombardments of 17 and 21 June 1940, part of the Italian invasion of France
- Anglo-American aerial bombardment of 27 May 1944, part of the Bombing of France during World War II
- Algerian consulate bombing in Marseille on 14 December 1973, far-right terrorist attack
- Marseille exhibition bombing on 30 September 1983, probable terrorist attack
- TGV train and Marseille station bombings on 31 December 1983, far-left terrorist attack
