= Police station attacks =

Police station attacks may refer to:

- Cyprus police station attacks, 1955
- 1986 Paris police station attack
- Ravansar and Sanandaj police station attacks, 2009
- January 2016 Paris police station attack
- Shchelkovo Highway police station attack, 2016
- 2018 Colombia police stations attacks
- Sarband police station attack, 2023
- Daraban police station attack, 2023
