= 1982 Paris car bombing =

1982 Paris car bombing may refer to:

- April 1982 Paris car bombing
- September 1982 Paris car bombing
