= Soldiers of the Algerian Opposition =

Soldiers of the Algerian Opposition Soldats de l'Opposition Algérienne (SOA)
- Leader: Mouloud Kaouane
- Founded: Circa 1965
- Preceded by: Organisation Armée Secrète
- Succeeded by: Armée de Légitimation des Pouvoirs (ALP)
- Newspaper: Unité et Reconcilation des Algériens
- Ideology: Anti-communism; Berberism; Françafrique
- Political position: Far-right

Soldiers of the Algerian Opposition (French: Soldats de l'Opposition Algérienne or SOA) was a French-based Algerian paramilitary organization active during the 1970s.

== History ==
The SOA was formed in the late 1960s by Mouloud Kaouane under impetus from the SDECE, France's external intelligence agency. The organization's stated aim was to unite all opposition against the government of Houari Boumédiène, inside and outside of Algeria, to overthrow his regime and install a pro-European, democratic government. The SOA recruited mostly from disaffected Pied-noir and Harki communities in France but also from Kabyle and middle-class Arab dissidents in Algeria.

== Activities ==
In January 1976, the SOA claimed responsibility for a bomb attack on the print works of the Algerian daily newspaper, El Moudjahid and attacks on the military courts of Constantine and Oran carried out by Berber activists. The Constantine bomb was diffused before it could go off but those in Algiers and Oran detonated.

The group has also been linked to the Aginter Press and a number of attacks against Algerian targets in Europe, including the 1973 bombing of the Algerian consulate in Marseille.

== Personalities ==
- Mohamed Haroun
- Smaïl Medjeber
- Joseph Ortiz

== See also ==
- Charles Martel Group
