= Nice attack =

Nice attack may refer to:

- 2003 Nice bombing
- 2015 Nice stabbing
- 2016 Nice truck attack
- 2020 Nice stabbing
- 2024 Nice arson attack
