= Olivier Cyran =

German journalist

Olivier Muller-Cyran, better known as Olivier Cyran, is a German journalist.

== Early life ==
He is a graduate of the Centre de formation des journalists (CFJ) in Paris.

He worked for the left-wing French magazine Charlie Hebdo from 1992 to 2001. He left, angered he said, by "the dictatorial behaviour and corrupt promotion practices" of a former editor, Philippe Val. He wrote that it had shown an increasing obsession with Islam. He traced this 'obsession' to Val, Caroline Fourest, Charb and others. Val and Fourest left in 2009.

In a 2013 open letter addressed to Charb and Fabrice Nicolino, he declared : 'you've made [France] a nastier place to live in. A country which now forbids a woman to work in a crèche on the basis that the piece of cloth she wears will traumatise the kids. Or a tertiary student, wearing a bandanna judged to be too wide, is excluded from her college with the blessings of a UMP mayor, the socialist Minister of Education, and the rabid press'.

He established a monthly journal CQFD, (Ce qu'il faut dire, détruire, developer), from 2003.

In 2013 he began to collaborate on the monthly Article 11 for which he writes critical pieces on celebrities in media and personalities of the political left. These have included Charb, and Daniel Mermet.
