= 2015 France attacks =

In 2015, France underwent through multiple terrorist attacks. 2015 France attacks may refer to:

- January 2015 Île-de-France attacks, series of five attacks across the Île-de-France region, 7 January – 9 January
  - Charlie Hebdo shooting, shooting at satirical magazine, 7 January
  - Hypercacher Kosher Supermarket siege, attack on Kosher supermarket at Porte de Vincennes, 9 January
- Saint-Quentin-Fallavier attack, suspected Islamist beheading and bombings, 26 June
- 2015 Thalys train attack, 21 August
- November 2015 Paris attacks, a series of violent attacks on 13 November

== See also ==
- List of terrorist incidents in France, in peacetime from 1800 to the present
- Paris attacks (disambiguation)
