= Capitole train bombing =

1982 bombing of Paris-Toulouse express train

- Location: Ambazac, France
- Date: 29 March 1982
- Attack type: Bombing
- Deaths: 5
- Injuries: 28
- Perpetrator: International Terrorist Friends of Carlos

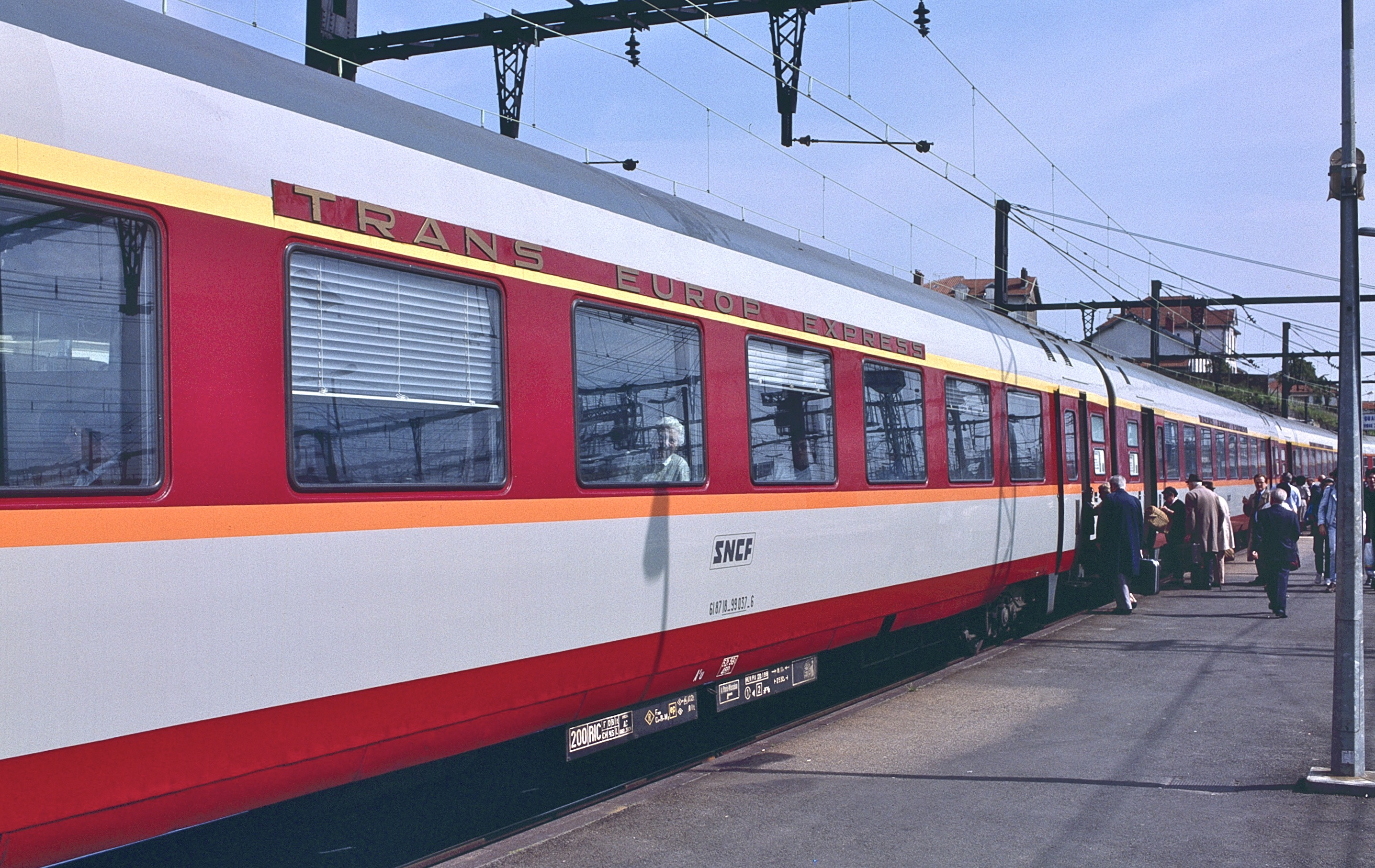
ex-Trans Europ Express, on the Rapide train Le Capitole du Matin, about to depart Limoges (Bénédictins) station for Paris, 1988.

The Capitole train bombing was the bombing of a Le Capitole train on the Paris-Toulouse express near Limoges on 29 March 1982. The attack killed five people and injured 28 others.

== Bombing ==
On March 29, 1982, a high-speed Le Capitole was travelling between Paris and Toulouse when bomb exploded in the first of the fifteen passenger cars. The bomb exploded at about 9:30 p.m. when the train was near the town of Ambazac, about 15 miles (24 km) northeast of Limoges, about three hours after the train had left Paris. The train, which carried between 300 and 400 passengers, was traveling at between 85 miles per hour (137 km/h) and 100 miles per hour (160 km/h) when it exploded. The engineer was able to bring the train to a halt after about a mile without it derailing, but wreckage blocked the track in both directions of travel between Limoges and Châteauroux. Three of the cars on the train were severely damaged and two of the blast victims were thrown 160 feet (49 m) from the train. More than 200 rescuers arrived to help free passengers that were trapped in the train, a process that took several hours. Rescuers had to walk more than half a mile (1km) down the tracks to reach the wreckage. After the passengers were freed, the train was towed to the train station in Ambazac.

The bombing was the first time that train passengers in France had been killed by an explosion of a criminal nature. Two other train blasts had occurred in France before, that caused only minor injuries. The bombing was claimed by a group calling itself "International Terrorist Friends of Carlos", and was later attributed to Venezuelan terrorist Carlos the Jackal. In 2011 Carlos was convicted for the bombing whilst he was already serving life imprisonment. The attack was followed with the bombing of an anti-Syrian newspaper office in Paris in April.

== See also ==
- Terrorism in France
- List of terrorist incidents in France
- TGV train and Marseille station bombings
