= Besançon courthouse attack =

Far-right terrorist attack in France in 1970

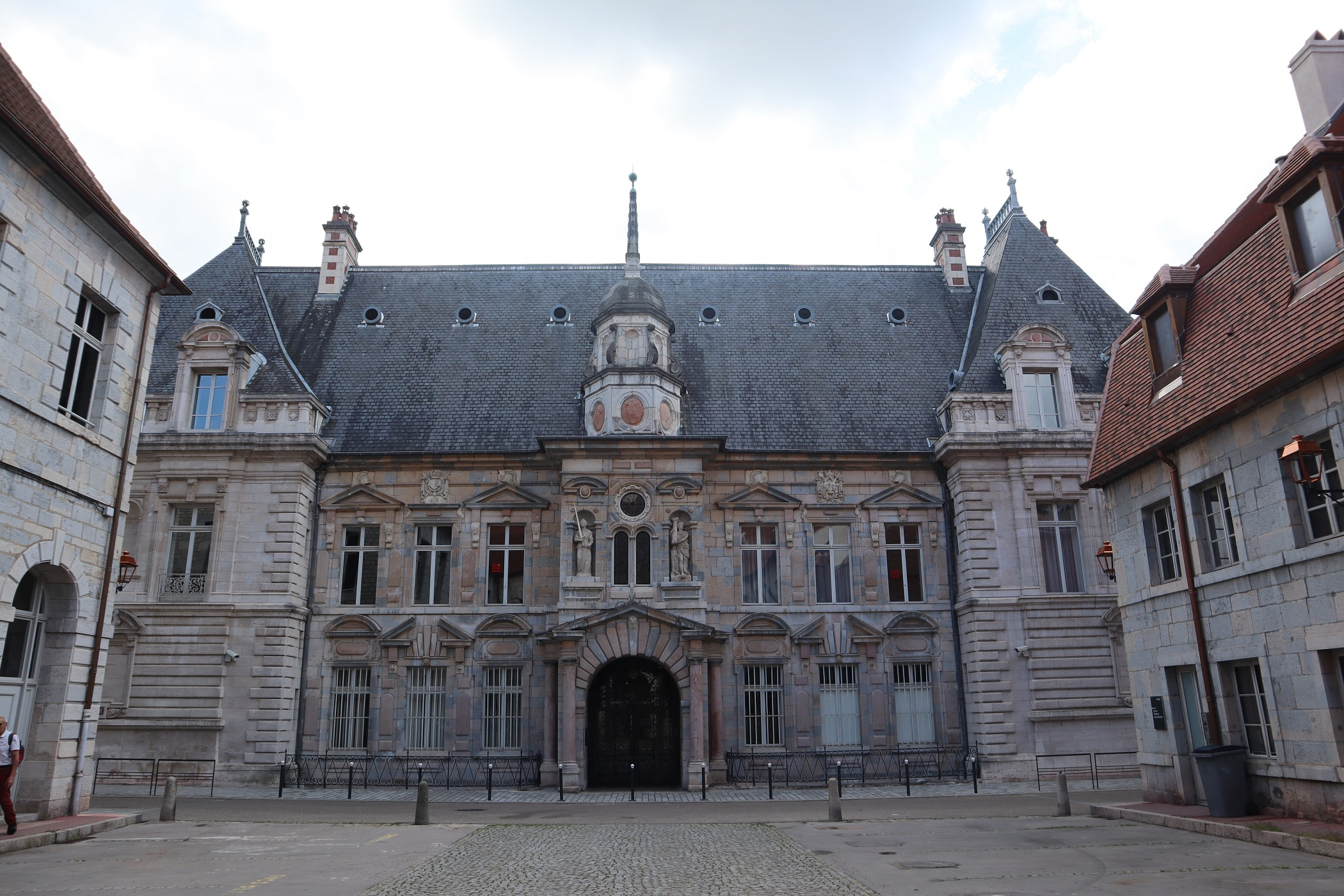
- The Besançon courthouse, in 2021

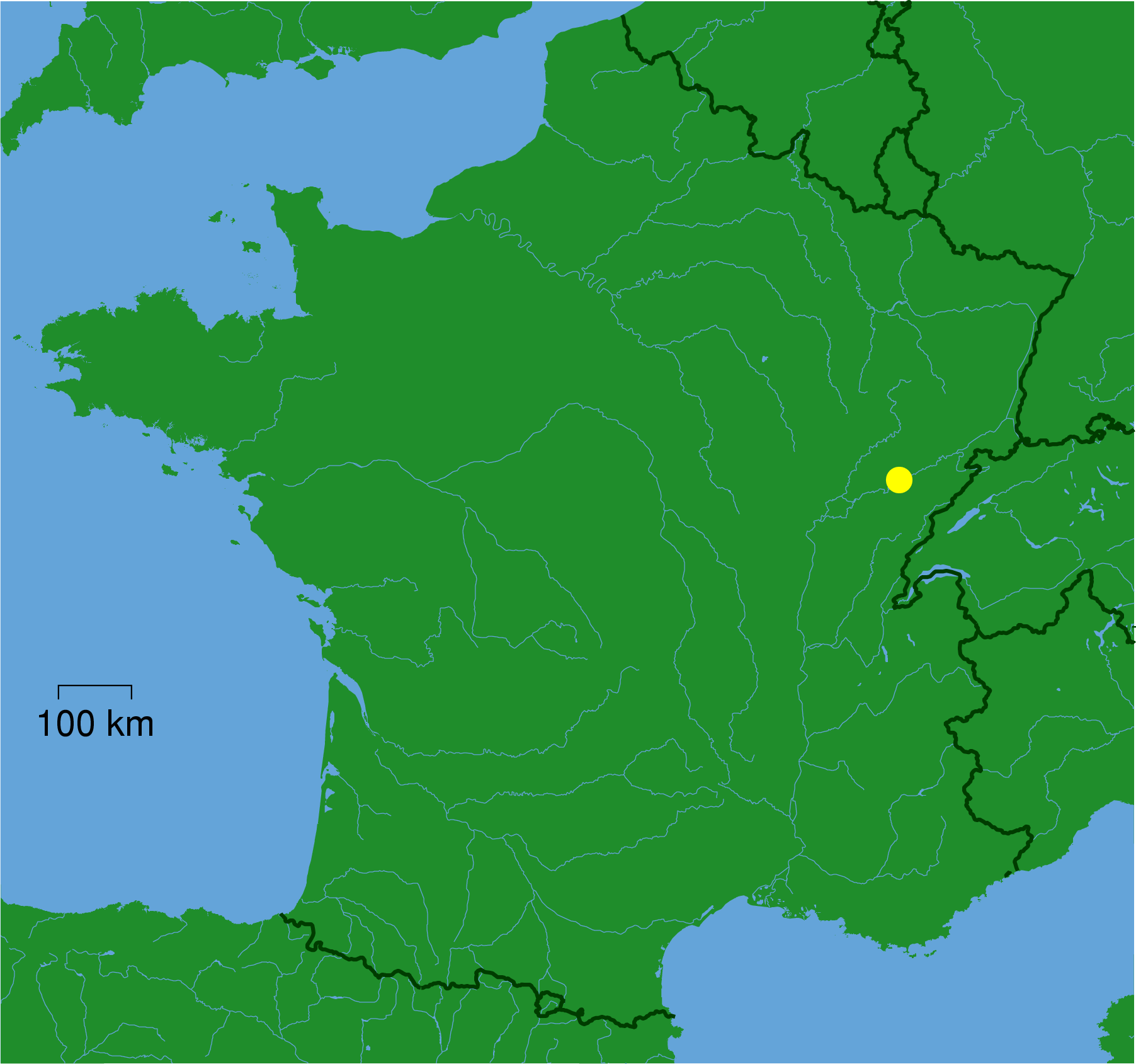
- Location of Besançon, in France
- Location: 47.2374843°N 6.0236485°E; Besançon, France
- Date: 9 May 1970; 10:30 pm (Paris)
- Weapon: IED
- Deaths: 0
- Injuries: 0
- Perpetrator: Right-wing extremists
- No. of participants: Two
- Motive: Political terrorism

A terrorist attack targeted the Besançon courthouse on 9 May 1970. It was perpetrated with a bomb by two men from the OAS and UDR movements, in a context of the resurgence of far-right violence in France.

== Attack ==
On 9 May 1970, at 10:30 pm, the place du Huit-Septembre (September 8 Square) was shaken by an explosion. The Besançon courthouse was just attacked with a bomb containing explosives and scrap metal. Damage was substantial but limited: only the porch, the bay windows, and the salle des pas perdus (hall of lost steps), partly classified, were seriously affected. A couple and their baby narrowly escaped the impact, but no one injuries were reported. The mayor, the socialist Jean Minjoz, immediately condemned this act, while the investigation began. Witnesses said they saw a man throw a device through, before escaping in an accomplice's car. At first the attack was attributed to the left, but two individuals were arrested on 14 May based on the number from their registration plate. They were former soldiers, workers at the Rhodiaceta factory, one was a member of the OAS and the other a member of the UDR acting for defiant motives possibly related to access to power through the SAC. The suspects admitted the facts, while weapons and ammunition were found.

== See also ==
- 2005 Planoise Forum fire
- Saint-Michel cinema attack
