= 1961 Vitry-Le-François train bombing =

Bomb attack on a Strasbourg–Paris train

Coordinates: 48°43′45″N 4°33′51″E

- Location: Blacy, Marne
- Date: 18 June 1961
- Target: train
- Attack type: Bomb
- Deaths: 28
- Injuries: 100+
- Perpetrator: Organisation armée secrète

The Vitry-Le-François train bombing of 18 June 1961 was a bomb attack on a Strasbourg–Paris train carried out by the Organisation armée secrète (OAS), a far-right paramilitary organization opposed to the independence of Algeria in the Algerian War. With 28 fatalities and over 100 injured, it was the deadliest terrorist attack in modern French history until it was surpassed by the November 2015 Paris attacks and the 2016 Nice truck attack, which killed 130 and 86 people, respectively.

The bombing targeted the No. 12 express train, which derailed while traveling at high speed near the small village of Blacy, Marne between Vitry-le-François and Loisy-sur-Marne. On the day after the derailment, investigators found that the rails had been sabotaged using an explosive device that went off when the train passed over it. It also emerged that the stationmaster at Vitry-le-François had earlier received a threatening letter from the OAS.

The sabotage theory was ruled out despite a threat letter being received a few days earlier, prompting Communist Party leader Jacques Duclos to demand an inquiry on the matter. Despite this, the attack was kept secret by the French state.

== See also ==
- List of terrorist incidents in France
