= 1982 Berlin restaurant bombing =

Terrorist incident in Germany

- Location: West Berlin, West Germany
- Date: 15 January 1982
- Attack type: Bombing
- Weapon: IED
- Deaths: 1
- Injuries: 46

On 15 January 1982, a bomb exploded in the Jewish Mifgash-Israel restaurant in the Wilmerdorf district in West Berlin, West Germany, killing a child and wounding 46 people. The device was attached to a radiator near the entrance to the restaurant. A woman holding a one-year-old baby girl was thrown into the street by the blast, and the child was left in critical condition and later died. Cars parked in front of the restaurant were damaged and the floor, ceiling, and furnishings inside the restaurant were badly damaged.

Authorities initially suspected that the growing Neo-Nazi movement in West Berlin was responsible for the explosion, since it took place a few days before the anniversary of the Wannsee Conference that was held in Berlin on January 20, 1942 that coordinated the implementation of the "Final Solution to the Jewish Question", which referred to the deportation and murder of European Jews during the Second World War.

Responsibility was claimed by Palestinian nationalists under the names "People's Federation for a Free Palestine" and the "Arab May 15 Organization for the Liberation of Palestine" in two separate claims. Police announced a search for a 30-year-old woman who witnesses described as "arab looking" who had been sitting near the radiator where the bomb had been left. She left the restaurant just before the explosion. Six Palestinian suspected members of the Popular Front for the Liberation of Palestine (PFLP) were detained by police but released after they had been questioned and their homes searched. Police offered rewards totalling $45,000 for clues leading to the capture of the bomber. On January 20, about 5,000 residents of West Berlin marched through the city to protest anti-Semitism and the restaurant explosion. Mohammed Rashid of the 15 May Organization who led the bombing of Pan Am Flight 830 on 11 August 1982 later reportedly provided information to investigators about the attack. Yehuda Zvi Blum, Israeli Ambassador to the United Nations, said that the Palestine Liberation Organization (PLO) was responsible for the attack.

== See also ==
- Goldenberg restaurant attack
