= Le Grand Véfour =

Restaurant in Paris, France

Coordinates: 48.8661°N 2.3379°E

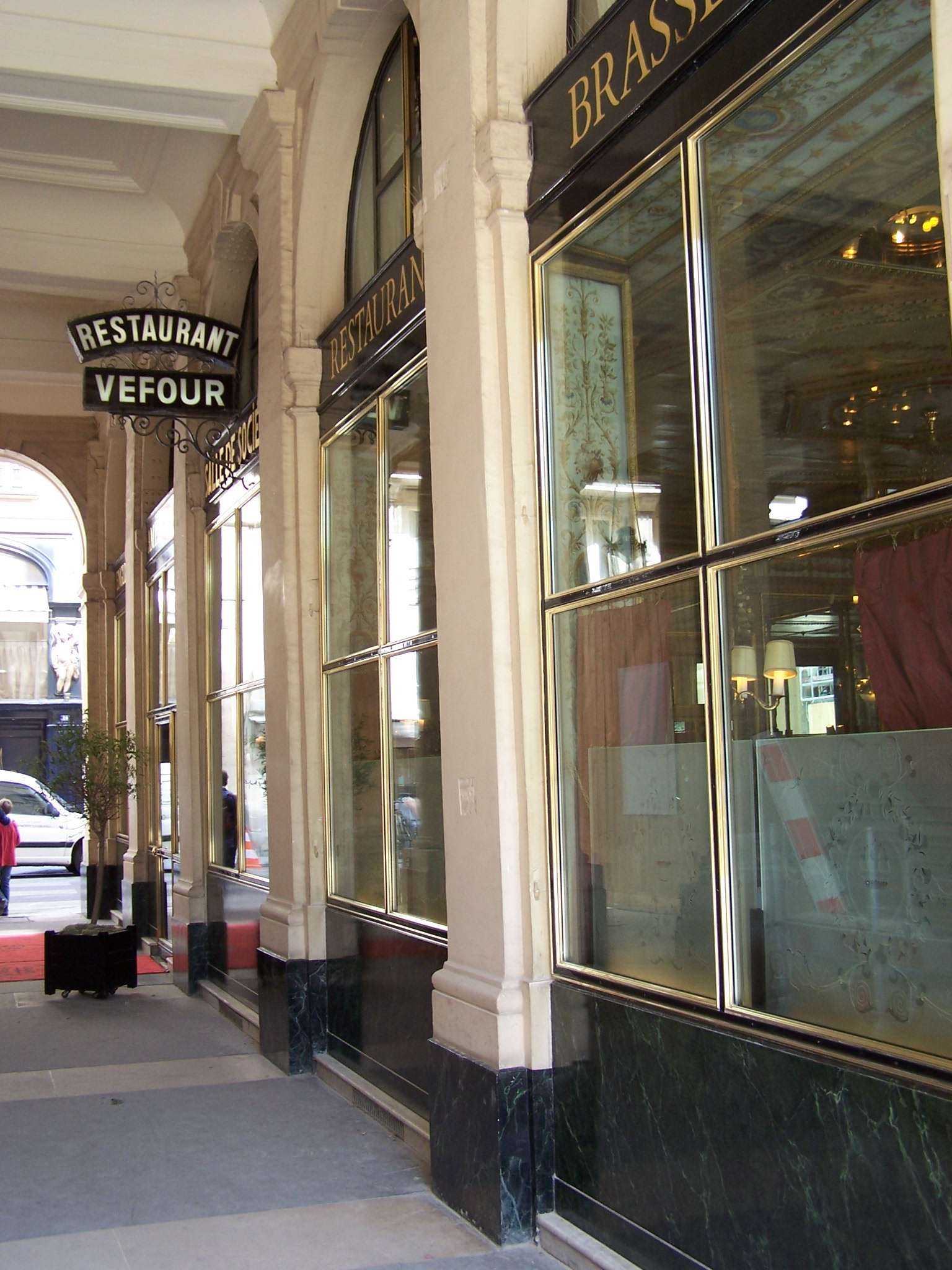
Grand Véfour

Le Grand Véfour (French: [lə ɡʁɑ̃ vefuʁ]), the first grand restaurant in Paris, France, was opened in the arcades of the Palais-Royal in 1784 by Antoine Aubertot, as the Café de Chartres, and was purchased in 1820 by Jean Véfour, who was able to retire within three years, selling the restaurant to Jean Boissier. A list of regular customers over the last two centuries includes most of the heavyweights of French culture and politics, e.g. Honoré de Balzac, Napoleon, Jean Cocteau, Colette and André Malraux along with le tout-Paris. Sauce Mornay was one of the preparations introduced at the Grand Véfour. Closed from 1905 to 1947, a revived Grand Véfour opened with the celebrated chef Raymond Oliver in charge in the autumn of 1948. Jean Cocteau designed his menu. The restaurant, with its early nineteenth-century neoclassical décor of large mirrors in gilded frames and painted supraportes, continues its tradition of gastronomy at the same location, "a history-infused citadel of classic French cuisine."

In 1983, the restaurant was damaged in a bomb attack. It was then bought by Jean Taittinger who restored and reopened the place.

When it lost one of its three Michelin stars in 2008 under the régime of Guy Martin for the Taittinger Group, it was headline news.
