= Rivoli Beaubourg cinema bombing =

1985 attack on a cinema in Paris

Coordinates: 48°51′24.90″N 2°21′13.22″E

Rivoli Beaubourg attack
- Location: Rue de Rivoli, Paris, France
- Date: 30 March 1985; 9:45 pm
- Deaths: 0
- Injuries: 18
- Perpetrator: Unknown
- Motive: Antisemitism (suspected)

On 30 March 1985, a bomb exploded inside the Rivoli Beaubourg cinema in the 4th arrondissement of Paris, France, where an annual Jewish film festival was being held. At the time the German film Eichmann und das Dritte Reich (1961) about the Holocaust was being screened.

Eighteen people were wounded when the bomb exploded, planted under a seat, causing a hole and damage to the ceiling. The organisers received an anonymous letter a week before about to "blow everything up, including the director" of the festival. The bombing caused fears of a rise of racism and anti-Semitism in France.

The next day, some 6,000 demonstrators including political and cinema elite marched around the cinema and a Jewish memorial near the Hôtel de Ville protesting against the attack. President François Mitterrand also condemned the attack.

Police said both far-right and far-left groups were the main suspects. Two neo-Nazi groups reportedly claimed responsibility but police found it uncredible. The Lebanese group Islamic Jihad Organization and the French far-left group Action Directe also claimed responsibility. Nobody was ever convicted of the attack.

Fabrice Nicolino, who was wounded in the blast, would again fall victim to a terror attack in Paris 30 years later in the Charlie Hebdo shooting, in which he was critically injured in the leg.

== See also ==
- 1980 Paris synagogue bombing
- Goldenberg restaurant attack
- February 1985 Paris bombing
- 1988 attack on Saint-Michel cinema in Paris
