= 1962 Issy-les-Moulineaux bombing =

Car bombing near Paris, France, on 10 March 1962

Issy-les-Moulineaux bombing
- Location: Issy-les-Moulineaux, France
- Date: 10 March 1962; 8:10 am
- Deaths: 3
- Injuries: 47
- Perpetrator: Organisation armée secrète

On 10 March 1962, a car bomb exploded during a peace event in Issy-les-Moulineaux, near Paris, France. It resulted in the deaths of three people and wounded forty-seven. It killed Roger Pateron, Albert Lavaud and Gabriel Cordier and caused significant damage to surroundings.

The attack was blamed on the far-right Secret Army Organisation (OAS) terror group who were campaigning against the independence of Algeria. At the time there was a peace march held in the town, organised by the Mouvement de la Paix. It occurred days before the signing of the Évian Accords which ended the Algerian War.

It caused outrage and strong sentiment against the OAS. Interior Minister Roger Frey denounced the OAS's "Nazi methods". Emmanuel d'Astier de La Vigerie denounced the lack of security provided by Paris Police Prefecture for the peace event. The media also especially evoked the case of five schoolgirls who were hurt and hospitalised after the blast.

== See also ==
- 1961 Vitry-Le-François train bombing
- 1973 Algerian consulate bombing in Marseille
