= Battle of Paris =

The Battle of Paris may refer to:

- Battle of Paris (1814), fought during the Napoleonic Wars
- Liberation of Paris (1944), fought during the Second World War
- Battle of Paris, nickname for a football match played between Paris Saint-Germain and Olympique de Marseille on 13 September 2020

== See also ==
- Paris attacks (disambiguation)
- Siege of Paris (disambiguation)
- Capture of Paris in World War II
