= 2015 Nice stabbing =

Terrorist attack in Nice, France

- Location: Nice, France
- Date: 3 February 2015
- Attack type: Stabbing
- Weapon: Knife
- Deaths: 0
- Injuries: 2
- Assailant: Moussa Coulibaly
- Motive: Islamist terrorism

On 3 February 2015, three soldiers, guarding a Jewish community center in Nice, France, were attacked with a knife by Moussa Coulibaly, a lone-wolf terrorist.

== Attack ==
Three soldiers were patrolling outside a Jewish communal building housing a Jewish radio station when Moussa Coulibaly rushed at one of the soldiers with a 20-centimetre (7.8-inch) knife aimed at his throat. Coulibaly only managed to wound that soldier in the face before wounding another soldier in the arm. The bulletproof vests worn by the soldiers prevented more serious injuries.

Coulibaly was arrested while attempting to flee. Two accomplices allegedly fled the scene and were not apprehended.

== Perpetrator ==
Moussa Coulibaly, age 30, is a French-Senegalese national raised in the though Val Fourré area of Mantes-la-Jolie. He had previous convictions for armed robbery and drug-related crimes. On 28 January 2015 he flew to Turkey, a popular destination at the time for young Europeans intending to fight for ISIL, but French security authorities contacted Turkish authorities who sent him back to France.

He was questioned by police in December 2014 for aggressively sharing his religious beliefs in a gym in Mantes-la-Jolie, Ile-de-France, where he lived with his parents and siblings. Police found handwritten documents about religion in the hotel room near the Gare de Nice-Ville where he was staying at the time of the attack.

Following his arrest, Coulibaly spoke about his hatred of France, of Jews and of the military.

=== Legal proceedings ===
Couliaby was indicted on charges of attempted murder during a terror operation.

== Reaction ==
US President Donald Trump described the Nice stabbing as one of several terrorist incidents that were "unreported" in news media.

== See also ==
- 1988 Cannes and Nice attacks
- 2003 Nice bombing
- 2013 La Défense attack
- 2016 Nice truck attack
