= Blacy, Marne =

Blacy
- Commune
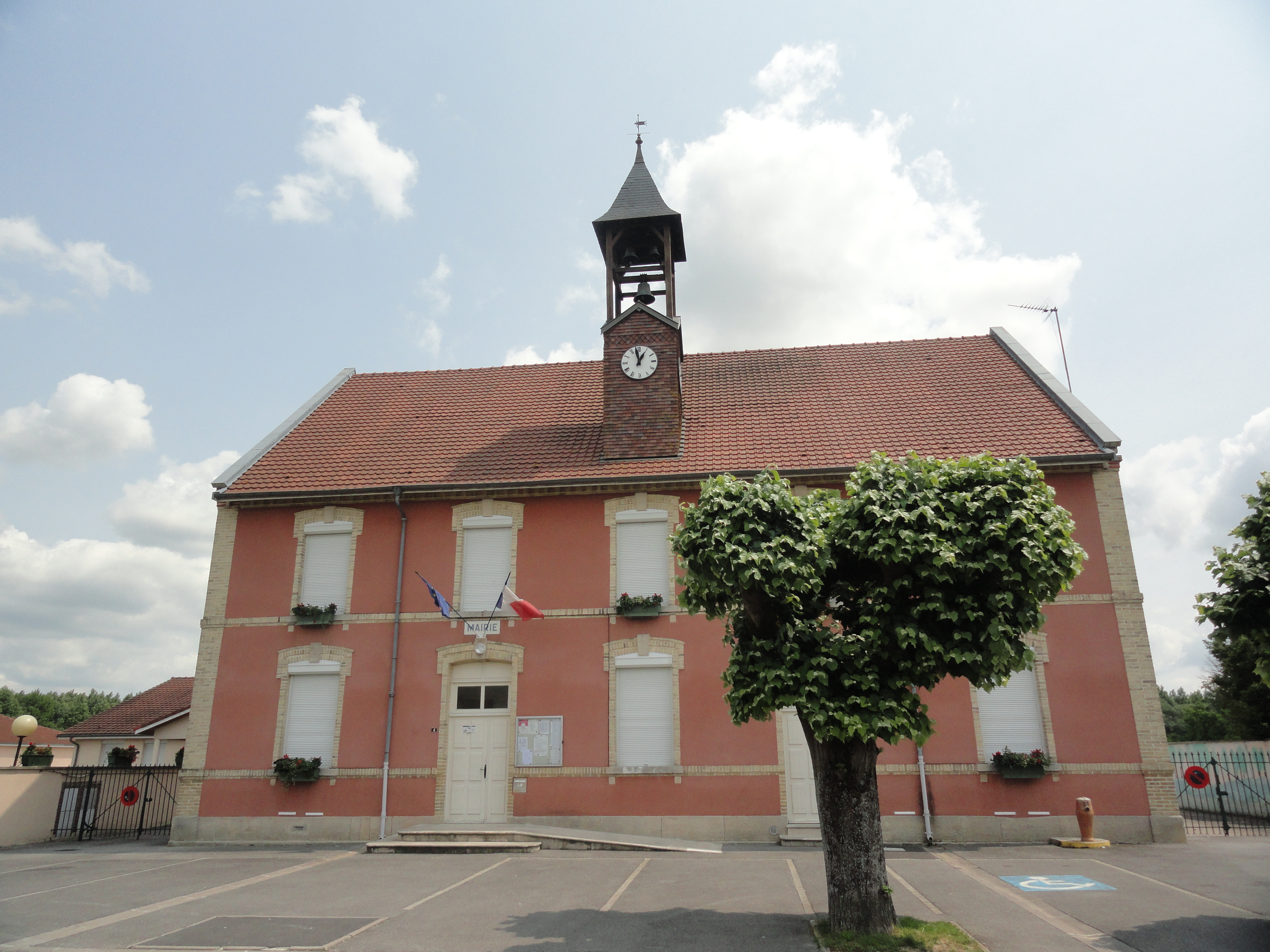
- The town hall in Blacy

- Coat of arms
- Location of Blacy
- Location within France Location within Grand Est
- Coordinates: 48°43′41″N 4°33′15″E
- Country: France
- Region: Grand Est
- Department: Marne
- Arrondissement: Vitry-le-François
- Canton: Vitry-le-François-Champagne et Der

Government
  - Mayor (2020–2026): Dominique Parnisari
- Area^{1}: 17.26 km^{2} (6.66 sq mi)
- Elevation: 101 m (331 ft)
- Population (2023): 614
  - Density: 35.6/km^{2} (92.1/sq mi)
- Time zone: UTC+01:00 (CET)
  - Summer (DST): UTC+02:00 (CEST)
- INSEE/Postal code: 51065 /51300
- ^{1} French Land Register data, which excludes lakes, ponds, glaciers > 1 km^{2} (0.386 sq mi or 247 acres) and river estuaries.

Blacy (French pronunciation: [blasi]) is a commune of the Marne department in northeastern France.

== Population ==
Historical population
Year	Pop.	±% p.a.
1968	670	—
1975	656	−0.30%
1982	588	−1.55%
1990	617	+0.60%
1999	581	−0.67%
2007	651	+1.43%
2012	668	+0.52%
2017	657	−0.33%
2023	614	−1.12%
Source: INSEE

== See also ==
- Communes of the Marne department
