= Aubervilliers restaurant attack =

2017 Molotov cocktail attack in France

- Location: Aubervilliers, Seine-Saint-Denis, France
- Date: 11 June 2017; 8:30 pm
- Attack type: Molotov cocktail
- Deaths: 0
- Injuries: 12

On 11 June 2017, a Molotov cocktail was thrown in a restaurant in Aubervilliers, a suburb of northern Paris in France. The attack injured 12 people, including six policemen, and caused a large blaze of the five-storey block the restaurant was part of. It happened on the day of French parliamentary elections.

== See also ==
- June 2017 Champs-Élysées car ramming attack
- Sept-Sorts car attack
