= November 2013 Paris attacks =

Attacks on newspapers officies

2013 Paris attacks
- Location: Paris, France
- Date: November 15–18, 2013; 10:15 (November 18) (UTC+1)
- Target: BFM TV offices, Libération offices, and Société Générale headquarters
- Attack type: Shooting
- Deaths: 0
- Injuries: 1
- Perpetrator: Abdelhakim Dekhar

On November 15, 2013, a gunman attacked the offices of the BFM TV news channel, in Paris, France. Three days later, on November 18, the same gunman attacked the offices of the Libération newspaper and the headquarters of the Société Générale bank. The gunman hijacked a motorist whom he forced to drive to Champs-Élysées before releasing him. The attacks set off a manhunt in search of the gunman, who was later apprehended.

The gunman, Abdelhakim Dekhar, was already known to police for his role in the 1994 Rey-Maupin affair.

== Attacks ==
=== BFMTV Studio Incident ===
On November 15, 2013, Dekar, acting alone, entered BFM-TV's news network station wielding a pump-action shotgun. He threatened journalists in the lobby briefly before leaving the station. It is unclear whether his weapon malfunctioned or if he chose not to shoot, but he left multiple unused cartridges and told witnesses, "Next time, I won't miss."

=== Libération News Headquarters Attack and Société Générale Incident ===
On November 18, 2013 at 10 a.m., just three days after the initial attack, Dekar entered the headquarters of the Libération newspaper and opened fire. During the attack, a 23-year-old freelance photographer was shot in the arm and chest. The gunman soon left and the victim was rushed to the hospital with critical injuries near his heart. Just two hours after the shooting at the Libération newspaper, two shots were fired outside the French bank, Société Générale. Soon after, witnesses described the shooter as wearing a khaki coat and hat. No one was injured.

=== Escape ===
After fleeing from the site of the Société Générale shooting, Dekhar acquired a vehicle by taking a man hostage in the town of Pluteaux, near La Défense. Dekar forced the man to drive three and a half miles towards central Paris before letting him go at the Champs-Élysées. The gunman continued to flee but was later arrested in an underground parking complex 6 miles north of Paris, in Bois-Colombes. Officials reported that the gunman was extremely incoherent due to multiple prescription medications that he had consumed within a short period of time. It was later reported by officials that he tried to attempt suicide this way.

== Suspect ==
Parisian prosecutor François Molins alleged that a lone gunman was behind the three attacks and the hijacking. On November 20, French authorities arrested Abdelhakim Dekhar in Bois-Colombes on suspicion of carrying out the attacks. Authorities said DNA and video evidence indicated that Dekhar was responsible for each of the attacks.

Dekhar was already known to police due to his role in the Rey-Maupin affair in which the police alleged that he had supplied a gun to Rey and Maupin, a couple who would eventually attack five police officers in a high profile chase.

Police acquired a number of "confused" letters written by Dekhar, in which he accused the media of "manipulation of the masses", of capitalism, and of participating in a "fascist plot."

=== Family and early life ===
Abdelhakim Dekhar was born in 1965 in Algrange, France. The third of eleven children, it is widely believed that he was born into an extremely unstable family and was a troubled child. At an early age, he ran away from home and spent a short period of his childhood in sponsored care. At 17, he joined the military and served in the 9th Parachute Regiment. During his first trial in the 1990s, he explained to the judge that his service was cut short because he was recruited to work for the Algerian secret service. After his release from prison in the late 1990s for his involvement in the Rey-Maupin affair, Dekhar lived quietly in Britain.

=== Involvement in Rey-Maupin affair ===
In 1998, Dekhar was sentenced to four years in prison for supplying the gun used by anarchist youths in an attempted robbery in the 1994 Rey-Maupin affair, but was soon released, having already served most of his time before the verdict.

== Motivation ==
At the trial, Dekhar claimed he was suicidal and "desperate" for the police to kill him, and raised political topics such as France's colonization of Algeria and social problems in the French suburbs.

== Trial and sentencing ==
In 2017, Dekhar was sentenced to serve 25 years for the 2013 attacks.
