= 2013 La Défense attack =

Stabbing of a French soldier

- Location: La Défense, France
- Date: 25 May 2013; 6 pm CEST (UTC+02:00)
- Target: A French soldier
- Attack type: Stabbing
- Weapon: Knife
- Deaths: 0
- Injuries: 1 (Cédric Cordier)
- Victim: Cédric Cordier
- No. of participants: 1

On the afternoon of 25 May 2013, French soldier Cédric Cordier was attacked and stabbed in the Paris suburb of La Défense by a man who was later ruled by a court not to be criminally responsible for psychiatric reasons.

== Background ==
In March 2012, French-Algerian Mohammed Merah went on a series of shooting sprees targeting soldiers and Jewish schoolchildren in Toulouse and Montauban, southern France. France was also on a state of high alert due to a threat from al-Qaeda in North Africa. The threat was sent in response to the French campaign to liberate northern Mali from Islamist occupation. Due to the alert, some 450 soldiers were placed on patrol in train stations and other locations in Paris.

The attack occurred three days after of the murder of a British soldier in Woolwich, London, though President Hollande said there was no evidence to link the two attacks, despite this there was speculation as to whether it was a copycat attack.

== Attack ==
In late afternoon, Saturday 25 May 2013, private first class Cédric Cordier was patrolling a busy underground hall in La Défense in uniform with two other servicemen. Around 6 p.m., a man approached Cordier from behind and attacked him with a knife. The attacker stabbed Cordier in the neck and fled into a crowded shopping area before the other servicemen could react. The attacker stabbed the soldier several times, narrowly missing Cordier's jugular vein and carotid artery.

=== Victim ===
The soldier attacked was 23-year-old private first class Cédric Cordier. He was stabbed in the neck and had lost a considerable amount of blood; however, his injuries were not life-threatening. He was in a stable condition and was treated at a nearby military hospital. He was released by 29 May.

Some sources described Cordier as 25 years old; others identified him as Cédric Cordiez.

=== Suspect ===
The suspected attacker was then-21-year-old Alexandre Dhaussy, a recent Christian convert to Islam. He turned 22 on 30 May. Dhaussy, unemployed and homeless, was already known to police since 2009 for petty crimes. He was known as becoming more radicalized in February, but had not been considered dangerous. Prosecutor François Molins said that Dhaussy's attack was believed to be motivated by his Islamic belief. In 2012, the police stopped him when he acted suspiciously as he did not want to wait for a bus with women; in 2011, he refused a job that involved working with women.

== Investigation ==
French Minister of Defence Jean-Yves Le Drian said Cordier was targeted "because he was a soldier". The case was assigned to a counter-terrorism prosecutor. The attacker, a "tall, athletic, bearded man", was recorded on security cameras wearing a light-colored robe called djellaba. He was seen saying a Muslim prayer before the attack. The attacker took off his robe and fled in European clothing.

On Wednesday 29 May, Minister of the Interior Manuel Valls stated that a man—later identified as Alexandre Dhaussy—was arrested in the morning in Yvelines. The suspect was traced from DNA found on a plastic bag left at the scene and was identified by fingerprint. He admitted the attack to the police who arrested him. Prosecutor François Molins said that Dhaussy "wanted to attack a representative of the state" and "acted in the name of his religious ideology", considering the character and timing of the attack. Molins also stated that Dhaussy stabbed Cordier with a "fairly clear intent to kill".

== Legal proceedings ==
On Friday 31 May 2013, Dhaussy appeared before anti-terrorism judges Thierry Fragnoli and Gilbert Thiel, who determined there was enough evidence to proceed with an investigation. He was placed under formal investigation for "attempted murder linked to a terrorist enterprise". In November 2015, the court declared him not criminally responsible for psychiatric reasons.

== Reactions ==
Minister of Defence Jean-Yves Le Drian said he was determined to lead "an implacable fight against terrorism". Minister of the Interior Manuel Valls warned of growing radicalization of young French Muslims online and by extremist imams.

== See also ==
- 2015 Nice attack (attack on soldiers guarding a Jewish community center in France)
