= Chez Jo Goldenberg restaurant attack =

1982 terrorist attack in Paris, France

Coordinates: 48.8569°N 2.3598°E

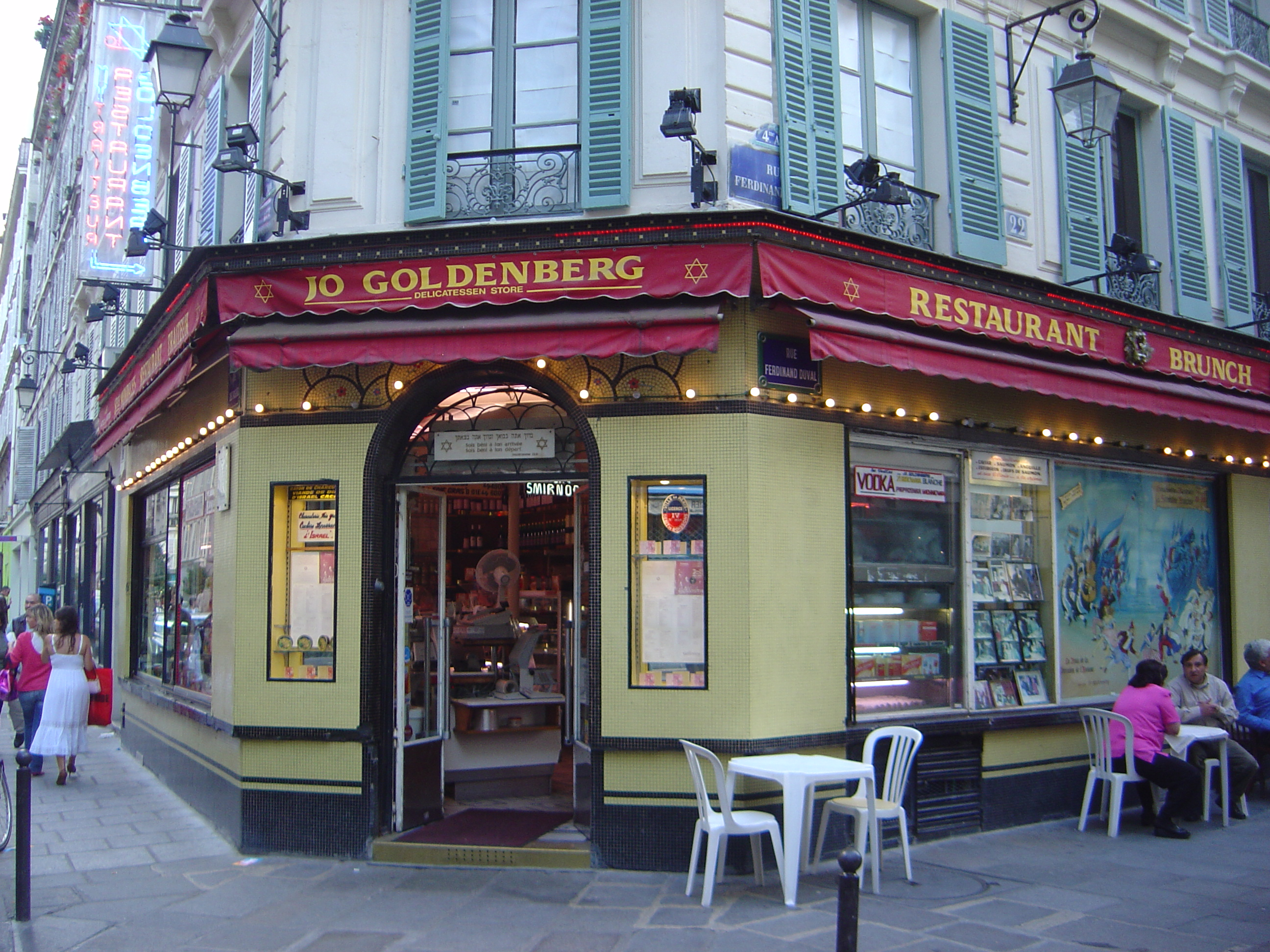
- Chez Jo Goldenberg restaurant in 2005
- Location: Rue des Rosiers, Paris, France
- Date: 9 August 1982; 13:15 (UTC+2)
- Attack type: Bombing and shooting
- Deaths: 6
- Injuries: 22
- Perpetrator: Abu Nidal Organization
- No. of participants: 2 or more

The Chez Jo Goldenberg restaurant attack was a bombing and shooting attack on a Jewish restaurant in the Parisien district of Marais on 9 August 1982 carried out by the Palestinian militant Abu Nidal Organization, a group that splintered from PLO. Two assailants threw a grenade into the dining room, then rushed in and fired machine guns. They killed six people, including two Americans, Ann Van Zanten, a curator at the Chicago Historical Society, and Grace Cutler, and injured 22 others. Mrs. Van Zanten's husband, David, an art history professor at Northwestern University, was among the injured. BusinessWeek later said it was "the heaviest toll suffered by Jews in France since World War II." The restaurant closed in 2006 and former owner Jo Goldenberg died in 2014.

Although the Abu Nidal Organization had long been suspected, suspects from the group were only definitively identified 32 years after the attacks, in evidence given by two former Abu Nidal members granted anonymity by French judges.

In December 2020 one of the suspects, Walid Abdulrahman Abu Zayed, was handed over to French police (at a Norwegian airport) and flown to France. He was still in detention as of Q3 2022.

In June 2025, the investigation was finished.

In July 2025 French prosecutors requested a trial for Walid Abdulrahman Abu Zayed, Nizar Tawfik Mussa and Mahmoud Khader. In September 2025, the Palestinian Authority arrested Mahmoud Khader, alias Hicham Harb, with the French Government planning to extradite him to France for trial.

On April 16, 2026, Palestinian authorities extradited Hicham Harb to France.

== Victims ==
22 people were injured and 6 died as a result of the attack. The fatalities were:

- Mohamed Bennemou
- André Hezkia Niego, 49
- Georges Demeter
- Denise Guerche Rossignol
- Grace Cutler, 65, a legal secretary in the Chicago Loop
- Ann Van Zanten, 30, curator of architectural collections at the Chicago Historical Society

== Suspects ==
Publicly named suspects involved in the attack
Name	Alias	Residence	Status
Mahmoud Khader Abed	Hicham Harb	Ramallah	Extradited by the Palestinian Authority to French custody in 2026.
Walid Abdulrahman Abou Zayed	Souhail Othman	Skien	In custody since 2020
Zuhair Mouhamad Hassan Khalid al-Abassi	Amjar Atta	Jordan	Arrested in Jordan in 2015, released on bail and banned from traveling.
Nizar Tawfik Mussa		Jordan	At large; extradition refused by Jordan citing statute of limitations expiration.

== Investigations and arrests ==
In March 2015, French authorities said that an international arrest warrant had been issued in connection with the case for three men who belonged to the organization. The suspects were identified as living in Norway, Jordan and Ramallah in the Palestinian territories. Mahmoud Khader Abed, 59, living in Ramallah are still being sought as of 2025.

In June 2015, a Palestinian named Zuhair Mohammed Hassan Khalid al-Abbasi, also known as "Amiad Atta," was arrested in Jordan, according to the Paris prosecutor's office, which also said that France has requested extradition. On June 17, Jordan released al-Abbasi on bail.

Walid Abdulrahman Abu Zayed (born 1957/1958), who had become a Norwegian citizen since the attack, is in French custody as of December 2020.

On 19 September 2025, the Palestinian Authority detained the suspect Mahmoud Khidr Abed Adra, also known as Hisham Harb (born 1955). French President Emmanuel Macron praised the "excellent cooperation with the Authority" and said the French government was working with the PA for Harb's extradition to France. On April 16, 2026, Hicham Harb was extradited to French custody.

=== Walid Abdulrahman Abu Zayed ===
On 9 September 2020, Walid Abdulrahman Abu Zayed, a Norwegian citizen, was arrested by Norwegian Police Security Service responding to the international arrest warrant issued by France in 2015.

In December 2020, he was being held at La Sante Prison in Paris. In December 2021, the pre-trial detention was extended for another six months; trial date had not been set as of Q1 2022.

Media said in February 2022 that the French police's view is that Zayed has not told the truth about his travels in 1982; during one interrogation he said that he had never been to France. In other interrogations he said that he had been to Monte Carlo.

== See also ==
- Irish of Vincennes
- List of attacks attributed to Abu Nidal
- List of terrorist incidents in France
- 1982 Berlin restaurant bombing
- September 1982 Paris car bombing
- Grand Véfour restaurant bombing
