= Cyprus police station attacks =

1955 attacks on police stations in Cyprus

Police Station Attacks
- Part of Cyprus Emergency
Date	19–22 June 1955
Location	Nicosia and Amiandos, Cyprus
Result	EOKA victory

Belligerents
EOKA	British Empire

Casualties and losses
Unknown	1 policeman

The Police Station Attacks were a series of guerrilla style attacks by the EOKA on police stations in Cyprus during June 1955 which led to the start of the Cyprus Emergency. The attacks took place:

- 19 June – dynamite attack at the police station at the Nicosia suburb of Ayios Dhometios;
- 19 June – bomb set off the central police building at Nicosia
- 22 June – the police station at Amiandos was attacked by an EOKA guerrilla group led by Renos Kyriakides, resulting in the death of a policeman.
