= TGV train and Marseille station bombings =

Bombing of high speed TGV train, France

- Location: Near Tain-l'Hermitage and in Marseille, France
- Date: 31 December 1983; 7:43 pm & 7:58 pm
- Attack type: Bombing
- Deaths: 5
- Injuries: 54
- Perpetrator: Carlos the Jackal

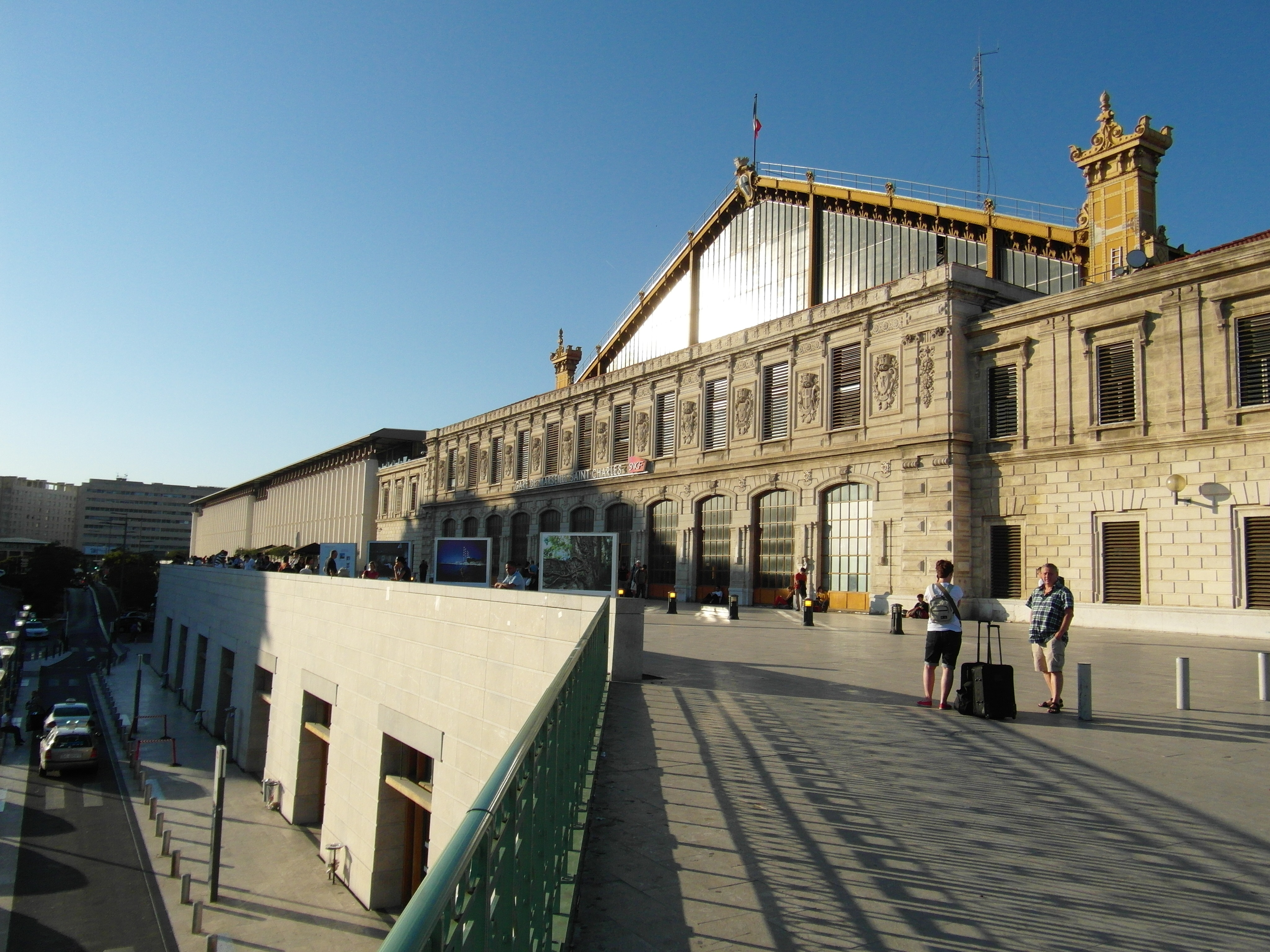
Marseille’s station, where one of the bombs was placed.

On 31 December 1983, three bombs went off in France, two on a high speed TGV train and another at the Gare de Marseille-Saint-Charles. The bombs killed five people.

The TGV train was in service with passengers, bound for Paris. The explosions happened when the train was travelling south of Lyon. Three passengers were killed and about 30 were wounded by the blast. The train suffered extensive damage with the number 3 passenger car being blown in half and pieces of the trains were found on rooftops of buildings hundreds of meters away. It was estimated that the bomb contained 16kg of explosives. About 15 minutes later a bomb planted in the luggage room of Marseille's terminus train station detonated. Two people were killed at the station.

Carlos the Jackal was convicted for this terrorist attack as well as two in 1982 (the Capitole train bombing and the April Paris car bomb) in December 2011.

== See also ==
- List of terrorist incidents in France
