= Caribbean Revolutionary Alliance =

The Caribbean Revolutionary Alliance (French: Alliance révolutionnaire caraïbe) was a militant autonomist organization active in the Caribbean-located overseas department of Guadeloupe in the 1980s. The group demanded the independence of Guadeloupe, Martinique and French Guiana. The group was outlawed by the French government following a series of bombings in 1984.

The group also carried out bombings in protest of the Route du Rhum sailing event in November 1986. The group was active from 1983 to 1988.
