= Rey-Maupin affair =

1994 violent incident in Paris, France

- Location: Paris, France
- Date: 4 October 1994; 32 years ago
- Attack type: Spree shooting, shootout, armed robbery, car chase
- Weapons: Two pump-action shotguns (one Mossberg-brand); Manurhin MR73 revolvers (stolen)
- Deaths: 5 (including one of the perpetrators)
- Injuries: 6
- Perpetrators: Florence Rey & Audry Maupin

The Rey-Maupin affair refers to a series of violent crimes committed in Paris on 4 October 1994 and its legal aftermath. The two perpetrators, Florence Rey ([flɔ.ʁɑ̃s ʁɛj], born 27 August 1975) and Audry Maupin ([o.dʁi mo.pɛ̃], born 20 April 1972), robbed two police officers before hijacking a taxi, taking its driver and a passenger hostage. When the taxi driver caused an accident to alert police, Maupin killed the driver and two police officers during a shootout before engaging patrol vehicles in a car chase. Following another crash, Maupin and a third police officer were killed during a second shootout.

It was a major case in France, with the trial of Florence Rey receiving much attention from the media.

== Background ==
Florence Rey, the daughter of a schoolteacher, was a 19-year-old student. After dropping out of medicine school, she studied literature. Audry Maupin, 22, was a philosophy sophomore at the University of Nanterre. At the time of the incident they were living together in a squat in an abandoned bourgeoise house in Nanterre. The pair were already under observation by the Renseignements Généraux, the French intelligence services, prior to the incident due to their involvement with an underground political group. When the police searched their squat after the killings, they found revolutionary and anarchist literature, such as The Society of the Spectacle by Guy Debord. They found the couple's writings, which echoed surrealism, radicalism and situationism.

== Details of incident ==
The incident began at 9:25 pm at the Porte de Pantin car pound. The pair, armed with two pump-action shotguns climbed the perimeter fence with the intention of stealing the service firearms of the two policemen on night duty inside and neutralizing them with their own handcuffs. They discovered that the two officers did not carry handcuffs so they sprayed them with tear gas before making their escape. Outside they boarded a taxi waiting at a red light driven by taxi driver Amadou Dialoo. A passenger, Georges Monnier, was already on board and they threatened them with their firearms, ordering the driver to drive to the Place de la Nation.

Ten minutes after hijacking the taxi, having reached the edge of Place de la Nation, Dialoo noticed a police patrol car with three officers returning to their base in the 11th arrondissement after finishing their duty. Dialoo decided to provoke an accident, ran a red light and slammed into the patrol car. The three officers jumped out and Rey and Maupin opened fire, killing officers Laurent Gerard and Thierry Memard. The third policeman continued the gunfight while wounded. During the gunfight Maupin fatally shot Dialoo but Monnier had escaped from the taxi and was lying on the ground.

The couple then hijacked a Renault Supercinq driven by Jacky Bensimon and ordered him to drive to the Bois de Vincennes. A chase began and Maupin fired through the rear window of the Renault causing a motorcycle patrolman to be lightly injured hitting the ground. On arrival at Vincennes, there was a road block so Maupin ordered Bensimon not to stop or he would kill him. 100 metres before the road block Bensimon pulled the hand brake which caused the car to spin three times. Bensimon was thrown out which probably saved his life. A motorcycle policeman, Guy Jacob, approached on foot and was fatally shot by Maupin. The police opened fire on the Renault, fatally wounding Maupin who died at 10pm the following evening at the Kremlin-Bicêtre hospital. Before being arrested, Florence Rey kissed Maupin without showing any emotion then refused to discuss the incident throughout her interrogation.

== Trial in 1998 ==
Rey was held on remand at the Maison d'Arrêt des Femmes at Fleury-Mérogis Prison while awaiting trial, where she spent her time reading and doing drama. She never discussed the incident with anyone, including her lawyers. Her trial began on 17 September 1998, at the cour d'assises in the Palais de Justice. She was defended by two lawyers, Maître Olivia Cligman and Maître Henri Leclerc. Throughout her trial, she continued to show no emotion and Maître Cligman even rebuked her in court for her indifference. Ten witnesses were called, but they all gave different versions of the event. The decision as to if she was a murderer or an accomplice rested on ballistic evidence which proved that Maupin fired all of the fatal shots.

The violence and the outrage provoked some to demand the return of capital punishment in France.

On 30 September 1998, the prosecutor asked the court to sentence Rey to 30 years. After her lawyers had delivered their plea, she was given the final opportunity to speak but she chose to remain silent. After five hours of deliberation the jury found her guilty as an accomplice and she was sentenced to 20 years imprisonment. She served her sentence in the Maison d'Arrêt des Femmes in Rennes.

Abdelhakim Dekhar, who was accused of having supplied a gun to the couple, was sentenced to four years in prison but was released soon after, having already served much of his time before the verdict.

== Aftermath ==
Rey became an icon of the counterculture. For example, the writer Patrick Besson wrote "Sonnet pour Florence Rey", and the band The Kills also wrote a song dedicated to her. The anarchist rock group Chumbawamba dedicated their song "Stitch That" to Florence Rey at live performances shortly after the incident. Artist Chantal Montellier wrote and illustrated a comic book, Les Damnés de Nanterre, to dispute the official account of the event. Rey has refused to give interviews.

After benefiting from a remission of her sentence, Rey was discreetly released on 3 May 2009. During her incarceration, she had received frequent visits from her mother and studied history and geography. She had also worked as a waitress in the prison refectory.

On 20 November 2013, Dekhar was arrested as a suspect in the Paris attacks, where local branches of the bank Société Générale were attacked as well as the newspaper Libération, where a photography assistant was shot and severely injured.
