= 2005 Planoise Forum fire =

2005 fire in Doubs, France

The Forum, today.

Commemorative plaque of Salah Gaham.

The 2005 conflagration of the Forum is a fire which took place in the neighborhood of Planoise, in Besançon (Doubs, France). The fire killed the building's concierge and seriously wounded two Chinese student residents.

== Chronology ==
November 2005 saw the outbreak of civil unrest in France, specifically in the suburbs of large cities. In Franche-Comté, severe rioting affected urban areas of Montbéliard province including Besançon, and the neighborhoods of Planoise, Montrapon-Fontaine-Écu and Clairs-Soleils specifically. Planoise witnessed a particularly serious event, with the torching on the night of November 2 of three cars in the basement of the "Forum", a university hall of residence for foreign students. Thick smoke soon filled the building; Salah Gaham, concierge of a neighbouring building, attempted to evacuate the building and to fight the fire with an extinguisher, but collapsed after several minutes from the effects of smoke inhalation. Firefighters attempted to revive Gaham, but he died on 3 November 2005 at age 34. He was the first fatality of the 2005 civil unrest in France.

The fire also caused to serious injuries: a Taiwanese female student was hospitalized with serious burns, and another student sustained injury jumping from a third-floor window. Others were hospitalized for minor injuries and many residents suffered psychological distress.

A city square in Besançon was later named in Gaham's honour.
