= February 1985 Paris bombing =

Attack on department store in France

- Location: Boulevard Haussmann, Paris, France
- Date: 23 February 1985; 9:31 am
- Deaths: 1
- Injuries: 15
- Perpetrator: Habib Maamar (15 May Organization)
- Motive: Palestinian nationalism

On 23 February 1985, a bomb detonated inside a British-owned Marks & Spencer department store on the Boulevard Haussmann in Paris, France, killing one person and wounding 15. The fatal victim was an employee at the store, Léonard Rochas, who died on his way to hospital. It occurred just as the store was opening its doors for business amid many customers waiting to enter. The blast caused heavy material damage. Two Britons were also among the injured.

The Marks & Spencer store had previously been attacked in 1976 and 1981, although nobody was hurt in those incidents and only minor damage was caused. Nobody claimed responsibility for those attacks.

== Perpetrators ==
Several telephone calls claiming responsibility were made, with different callers claiming to represent the Caribbean Revolutionary Alliance (ARC), Action Direct (AD), Abu Nidal Organization (ANO), and an unprecedented group calling itself International Collective Army Against Unemployment. Police however called these claims as not credible enough. The 15 May Organization reportedly also claimed responsibility at the time, and the Provisional Irish Republican Army (IRA) was blamed by the media, but they denied involvement saying that it has never carried out attacks on French territory.

In May 1986, police arrested and charged suspects Phillipe Frigerio and Tunisian Habib Maamar in Nancy, the latter of which was reported at the time to be linked to the pro-Iranian Hezbollah group. During court procedures, Maamar reportedly had no political motives but 'accepted' the job of the bomb attack offered by the 15 May Organization, a communist and Palestinian nationalist organisation, lured by profit. Maamar was apparently also the perpetrator of bombing a Marks & Spencer store in London, England, in December 1983 (not related to the Harrods bombing). He was sentenced to 18 years in prison in December 1989.

Marks & Spencer was likely targeted as its former chairman Joseph Sieff was a Zionist. Sieff previously survived an assassination attempt by Ilich Ramírez Sánchez ("Carlos the Jackal") from the Popular Front for the Liberation of Palestine (PFLP) in 1973, a group from which the 15 May Organization roots from.

== See also ==
- 1985-86 Paris attacks
- Joseph Sieff
- Rivoli Beaubourg cinema bombing
