= Siege of Paris =

Siege of Paris may refer to:

- Siege of Paris (845), the Viking siege by Reginherus, possibly Ragnar Lodbrok
- Siege of Paris (856-857), the Viking siege by the Danes
- Siege of Paris (861), the Viking siege by the Danes
- Siege of Paris (885–886), the Viking siege by Rollo
- Siege of Paris (978), by Otto II of Germany, and Holy Roman Emperor
- Siege of Paris (1358), by Charles V of France
- Siege of Paris (1360), by Edward III, King of England
- Siege of Paris (1370), by Robert Knolles
- Siege of Paris (1418), also known as the Paris coup d'état and massacres of 1418, by the Burgundians
- Siege of Paris (1420), also known as the capture of Paris of 1420, by Henry V, King of England
- Siege of Paris (1427), by Charles VII
- Siege of Paris (1429), by Charles VII of France and Joan of Arc
- Siege of Paris (1435–1436), by Charles VII of France
- Siege of Paris (1567), also known as the Battle of Saint-Denis, by Louis I, Prince of Condé
- Siege of Paris (1465), by the League of the Public Weal
- Siege of Paris (1590), the Protestant siege by Henry IV of France
- Siege of Paris (1649), during The Fronde, by Louis, Grand Condé
- Siege of Paris (1870–1871), the German siege in the Franco-Prussian War

== Artworks ==
- The Siege of Paris, a 1884 painting by Ernest Meissonier

== See also ==
- Battle of Paris (disambiguation)
