= Fabrice Nicolino =

French journalist (born 1955)

Fabrice Nicolino (born 1955) is a French journalist.

== Biography ==
Fabrice Nicolino, born in Paris, has worked various trades - including as a manual worker - before becoming Editorial secretary in the Femme Actuelle weekly in 1984. He then became an investigative reporter and has since worked with a number of printed outlets, including Géo, Le Canard enchaîné, Télérama, Terre sauvage . He has been writing a column in the catholic daily La Croix since 2003.

He has founded with Dominique Lang a publication titled Cahiers de Saint-Lambert, which is subtitled "Facing the environmental crisis together". Since 2007, he has been writing a blog: « Planète sans visa ».

Fabrice Nicolino has been writing papers on environmental issues in the satirical weekly newspaper Charlie Hebdo since January 2010.

He was wounded after the 1985 Rivoli Beaubourg cinema bombing. He also suffered a severe leg injury during the 7 January 2015 Charlie Hebdo shooting.

== Publications ==
Although Nicolino has written and co-written fiction and non-fiction books on a range of subjects, including some for younger audiences, the bulk of his writing addresses environmental issues such as pesticides and chemical poisoning, biofuels, or the meat industry.

- Jours sang, Fleuve Noir, 1987
- Le Tour de France d'un écologiste, Le Seuil, 1999
- L'Auvergne en ballon, Au pays du nouveau monde, 1999
- Guérande, au pays du sel et des oiseaux, text for a book of photographs by Erwan Balança, L'Étrave, 2004
- La France sauvage racontée aux enfants, Sarbacane, 2005
- Pesticides, révélations sur un scandale français, with François Veillerette, Fayard, 2007
- Yancuic le valeureux, illustrated by Florent Silloray, Sarbacane, 2007
- La Faim, la bagnole, le blé et nous. Une dénonciation des biocarburants, Fayard, 2007
- Le Vent du boulet, Fayard, 2009 ISBN 978-2213636887
- Bidoche, l'industrie de la viande menace le monde, Les Liens qui Libèrent, 2009 ISBN 978-2918597018 - republished by Actes Sud ISBN 978-2742793044 - republished as a pocket book by Babel, 2010
- Biocarburants : une fausse solution, Hachette, 2010 ISBN 978-2012705265 (Pocket publication of the 2007 book)
- Qui a tué l’écologie ?, Les Liens qui libèrent, 2011 - Re-published as a pocket book by, Seuil, coll. Le Point, 2012
- Itinéraire d'une goutte d'eau, texts for a book of photographs by Nicolas Van Ingen and Jean-François Hellio, Plume de Carotte, 2011, Les Liens qui Libèrent, 2011 ISBN 978-2-918597-25-4
- Ma tata Thérèse, illustrated by Catherine Meurisse, éditions Sarbacane, 2012; youth album
- La Vérité sur la viande, collective work, Les Arènes, 2013 ISBN 978-235204-2426
- Un empoisonnement universel. Comment les produits chimiques ont envahi la planète, Les Liens qui Libèrent, 2013 ISBN 979-10-209-0137-8
