= Charles Martel Group =

French anti-Arab terrorist organization

- Groupe Charles-Martel
- Dates active: 1973–1987
- Country: France
- Active regions: Primarily Paris and Marseille
- Ideology: French nationalism White nationalism Anti-Arabism; Antisemitism
- Political position: Far-right
- Status: Inactive
- Size: Unknown; no one has ever been arrested in connection to the group

The Charles Martel Group (French: Groupe Charles-Martel, also Club Charles-Martel, Cercle Charles-Martel, Commando Charles-Martel) was a French far-right anti-Arab militant group which operated in the 1970s and 1980s. It was named after Charles Martel, the Frankish military leader who defeated the Umayyad invasion of Gaul at the Battle of Tours in 732. The group was formed by veterans of the Organisation armée secrète, which fought against Algerian independence during the Algerian War.

Their attacks were primarily centered on Algerian properties, businesses, and government offices. This stemmed from the Algerian war fought between France and the FLN between 1954 and 1962. Algeria had long been a colony of the French and saw other colonized nations gaining their independence in the aftermath of World War II. This led to a prolonged guerrilla war, with acts of terrorism, torture and war crimes being committed by multiple actors in the conflict. Algeria ultimately gained independence, resulting in the exodus of the Jewish, Pied-noir and Harki communities from the region. In several cases multiple groups claimed responsibility for attacks in the 1970s and 1980s, and the parties actually responsible have not been definitively established.

== Attacks ==
- 14 December 1973 - Algerian consulate bombing in Marseille: Bomb attack on the Algerian consulate offices in Marseille. Four Algerians were killed and 20 injured. Historians differ on when the group actually formed. Some do not credit the first attack to this group as they have the group coming together in 1975. However, since this attack targeted Algerian offices and killed Algerian migrants it is associated with the group.
- 2 March 1975 - Bomb attacks on the Air Algérie offices in Toulouse and Lyon. No one was hurt. These were two separate attacks on the same day, yet it appears they were done more as a scare tactic as nobody was injured in either attack. This gives merit to the argument that the first attack years earlier was an independent group. Bombing the offices of the major airline of Algeria would seem to infer that the next step would be a hijacking or bombing of an actual airline.
- 10 April 1975 - Car bomb explodes outside the Algerian consulate in Paris. No one was hurt. Claimed by the Charles Martel group as a protest against the French President's visit to Algeria. An openly admitted attack by the group. For the first time since granting Algeria their independence, the French head of state, at this time Valery Giscard-d'Estaing, was making a visit to the former colony. Relations had not been going well and the Algerians were upset at many things, including prior terror attacks, The French president made a bold move by going. This outraged the radicals and led to a minor incident.
- 24 December 1976 - The Charles Martel Group claimed responsibility for the assassination of Jean de Broglie in Paris. De Broglie had been one of the negotiators of the Évian Accords which helped end the Algerian War. However, French police alleged that de Broglie's murder was arranged by his financial advisor, Pierre de Varga, in order for de Varga to avoid repaying a debt to de Broglie. De Varga was sentenced to 10 years in prison for his role in the murder.
- 1 November 1977 - Two Algerians kidnapped in Paris. Claimed as a reprisal for the killing and kidnapping of French nationals in Mauritania the previous month by the Algerian-backed Polisario Front. Mauritania was another former French colony who was now involved in a war of their own with other African factions including the radical group known as the Polisario Front. The French were giving aid to their former colony in the form of weapons and other resources. Then two French men working in the mining industry in Mauritania were killed and another six were kidnapped. The Charles Martel Group acted quickly after this but showed some restraint by sparing the lives of the two men they kidnapped.
- The group claimed responsibility for the killing of anti-colonial activist Henri Curiel in 1978, but the parties responsible for Curiel's death have never been conclusively established.
- 7 May 1980 - Bombing of the North African Moslem Students Association. No one was hurt. Little is known about this act, primarily because nobody was injured once again. It had also been well over two years since the previous attack, it was possible that some of the resentment was starting to fade.
- 11 May 1980 - Algerian consulate in Aubervilliers bombed. No one was hurt. A handwritten leaflet was left claiming responsibility, and stating that the Charles Martel Group was "against the church, the Jews, the starving of the Third World, and for the white race". This attack came less than a week after the previous bombing but once again failed to injure anyone. It is difficult to know the exact times of the attacks, but it is likely that there was intent to not harm anyone during most of these attacks. The intent was to leave a message and in this case that was done literally.
- 9 August 1983 - Bomb attack on the Air Algérie office in Marseille. No one was hurt.
- 30 September 1983 - Marseille exhibition bombing: Bombing of an international fair in Marseille kills one person and injuries 26 others. The blast occurred near the Algerian and American stands. The Charles Martel Group was one of many groups to claim responsibility for the bombing but no arrests are ever made in the case.
- January 1987 - Attack on the offices of the magazine Jeune Afrique in Paris.
