= Marseille exhibition bombing =

1983 bombing in Marseille, France

- Location: 43.2727°N 5.3947°E; Marseille, France
- Date: 30 September 1983
- Target: Marseille International Fair (Foire International de Marseille)
- Attack type: Bombing
- Deaths: 1
- Injuries: 27
- Perpetrator: Unknown
- Motive: Unknown

In the late afternoon on 30 September 1983, a bomb detonated during an international fair at the Palais des Congrès (exhibition centre) in Marseille, France. One person died and 27 other people were injured in the attack, which happened near the American, Soviet, and Algerian stands. The explosion caused a false ceiling in the conference hall to collapse. The bomb had been placed behind a curtain near the entrance to the Algerian pavilion, and commentators stated that the fact that it was not spotted before it went off suggested that it had been placed shortly before the explosion.

An anonymous telephone call to police claimed responsibility for the attack on behalf of the Orly Group, a unit of the Armenian Secret Army for the Liberation of Armenia that had participated in an attack earlier that year at Orly Airport in Paris. Less than an hour later, the Charles Martel Group, an ultra-right-wing anti-Arab group, called a local newspaper and said it was responsible. French Interior Minister Gaston Defferre said that he doubted that the Orly Group was involved, since the group had quickly called news agencies after their past attacks with specific details to back up their claims, but in this case the call came about two hours after the bomb. On the other hand, although the city of Marseille had a population that included 80,000 people of Armenian origin, it also had a population of Algerians, Moroccans, and Tunisians, and had recently been the location of several racially motivated incidents linked to the Charles Martel Group. The group was linked to the 1973 Algerian consulate bombing in Marseille and other attacks, and the bomb was placed near the entrance of the Algerian exhibit. The next day, another anonymous call claimed responsibility for the attack on behalf of the Lebanese Armed Revolutionary Factions.
