= 1980 Turkish Consulate attack in Lyon =

Attack in Lyon, France

The 1980 Turkish Consulate attack in Lyon was an attack on the Turkish Consulate General in Lyon on 5 August 1980, where four people were wounded. Two Armenian gunmen stormed the Turkish Consulate General and demanded the location of the Consul General. When the doorman did not understand the gunmen's broken French, the gunmen opened fire. The Armenian Secret Army for the Liberation of Armenia (ASALA) claimed responsibility for the attack.
