= Grand Véfour restaurant bombing =

Unsolved crime in 1983

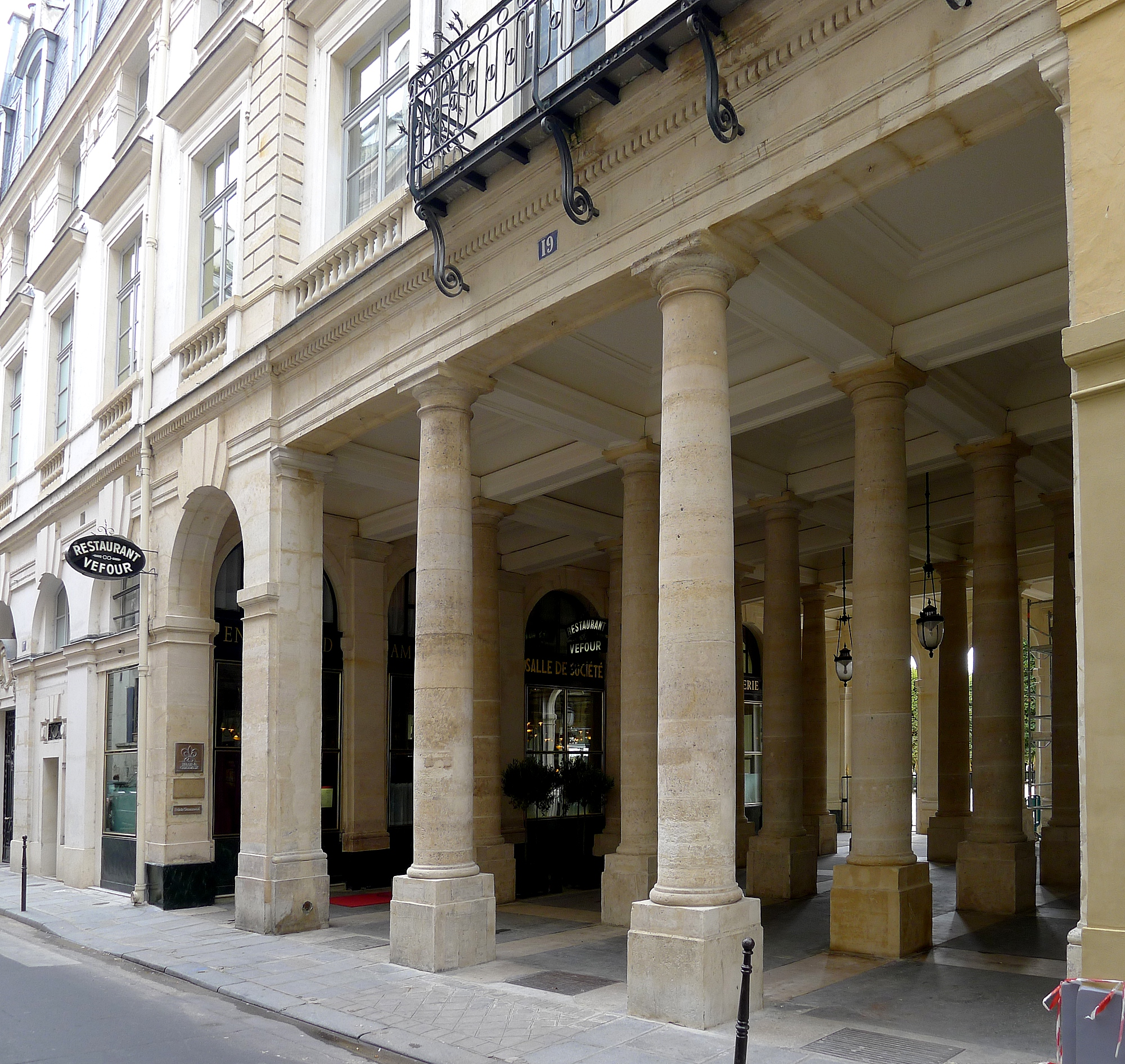
- Front of the Le Grand Véfour
- Location: 48.8661°N 2.3379°E; Paris, France
- Date: 23 December 1983; 10:30 pm
- Deaths: 0
- Injuries: 12
- Perpetrator: Unknown

On 23 December 1983, the Le Grand Véfour restaurant in Paris, France was damaged in a bomb attack, in which twelve people were wounded. The attack in one of Paris's most exclusive restaurants left a large crater in its front. Five of the injured diners were Americans, and two were Japanese.

Raymond Oliver, owner of Le Grand Véfour, was quoted by his daughter as saying, "I am ruined. My clients trust me and this had to happen to me as I reach the end of my career."

Nobody claimed responsibility for the attack. The Action Directe terror group also denied involvement, saying it did not carry any political significance. The case file was closed by police and no one has been apprehended.

== See also ==
- Chez Jo Goldenberg restaurant attack
