= April 1982 Paris car bombing =

Terrorist incident in France

- Location: Paris, France
- Date: 22 April 1982
- Attack type: Bombing
- Deaths: 1
- Injuries: 60
- Perpetrator: Carlos the Jackal

On 22 April 1982, a powerful car bomb detonated on Rue Marbeuf in the 8th arrondissement of Paris in France during the morning rush hour. It killed a young woman and injured 60 other people. The offices of the Lebanese newspaper Al-Watan al-Arabi appeared to be the target.

== Background ==
Relations between France and Syria were generally excellent until the assassination of the French Ambassador to Lebanon, Louis Delamare, on 4 September 1981. Delamare was shot in West Beirut nearby a Syrian Army roadblock during the Syrian occupation of Lebanon. An investigation from the Al-Watan Al-Arabi newspaper, which is anti-Syrian, found that Lebanese Shi'ites acting on behalf of the Syrian special services were responsible. This account was soon spread throughout the French press.

In March a high speed Capitole train in France was bombed, killing five people. On 4 April 1982, Israeli diplomat Yacov Barsimantov was assassinated in Paris, apparently the work of the Palestine Liberation Organisation (PLO) or the Lebanese Armed Revolutionary Factions (LARF).

== Motives ==
The bombing was also speculated to be linked to two comrades of Venezuelan international terrorist Ilich Ramírez Sánchez, also known as "Carlos the Jackal" - Bruno Bréguet and Magdalena Kopp - who were both facing trial that day after being arrested on 16 February in Paris. The Al-Watan Al-Arabi reportedly annoyed Syrian President Hafez al-Assad. Carlos, Bréguet and Kopp had already been granted asylum in Syria. It is thought Bréguet and Kopp were already attempting to bomb the offices that day as 5 kg of nitropenta explosives were found in their car when they were arrested. According to French prosecutors in 2011, Carlos masterminded the attacks partly to force the authorities to free Bréguet and Kopp.

== Aftermath ==
After the bombing, the French government expelled two Syrian diplomats and recalled its ambassador from Damascus for consultation. Interior Minister Gaston Defferre stopped short however from blaming the Syrian government on the bombing. The Syrian Foreign Minister Abdul Halim Khaddam's visit to France scheduled that night was cancelled. Syria denied any link with the bombing and responded by ordering out two French diplomats and recalling its envoy from Paris.

On 25 May 1982, a car bomb inside the French Embassy in Beirut killed 11 people.

Bréguet and Kopp were charged in court, but were given lighter sentences following threatening letters from Carlos to French authorities. They were later paroled in 1985.

In 2011, Carlos was tried for involvement in the attack. He denied any connections with the attack, including the Capitole train bombing in March and other attacks in 1983. He was convicted in December 2011 and sentenced to life in prison on top of his existing sentences.

== See also ==
- List of terrorist incidents in France
