= 1986 Paris police station attack =

Far-left attack

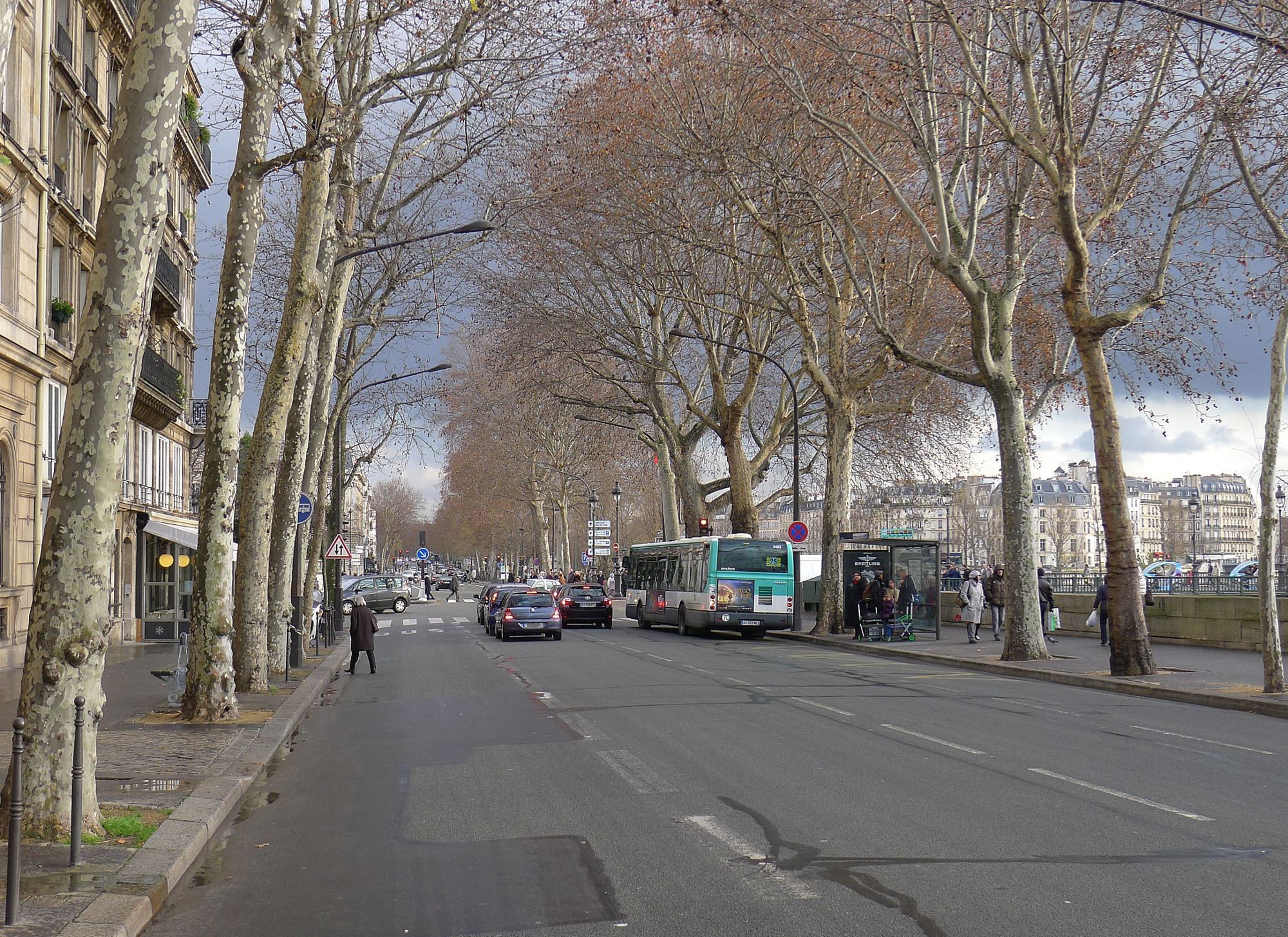
- Quai de Gesvres in 2012, street of the police station
- Location: 48.8570°N 2.3486°E; Quai de Gesvres, Paris, France
- Date: 9 July 1986; 4:00 pm
- Attack type: Terrorist attack
- Weapon: IED
- Deaths: 1
- Injuries: 22
- Perpetrator: Action directe

The far-left Direct Action (AD) terror group detonated a bomb at the headquarters of the Brigade de répression du banditisme (BRB) police division in Paris, France, on 9 July 1986. It killed the division's chief inspector, Marcel Basdevant, and injured 22 other officers. The group claimed responsibility two days later.

== Attack ==
The bomb is thought to have contained 10 kg of explosives and was planted in a restroom on the third floor. It caused major damage to the building, which was still new. Maxime Frérot alias "Max le fou", explosives manufacturer and member of the Lyon cell of Action Directe, who was already wanted for three murders, including two police officers, was arrested on 27 November 1987 in the underground parking lot of the Mercure Hotel at Part-Dieu station, in Lyon. The brother attempted to escape by opening fire on the police, wounding one officer..

On the same day, the West German Red Army Faction (which was allied with Direct Action) assassinated Karl Heinz Beckurts in Bavaria.

== See also ==
- January 2016 Paris police station attack
- Paris police headquarters stabbing
