= Saint-Michel cinema attack =

1988 terror attack by integralist Catholics

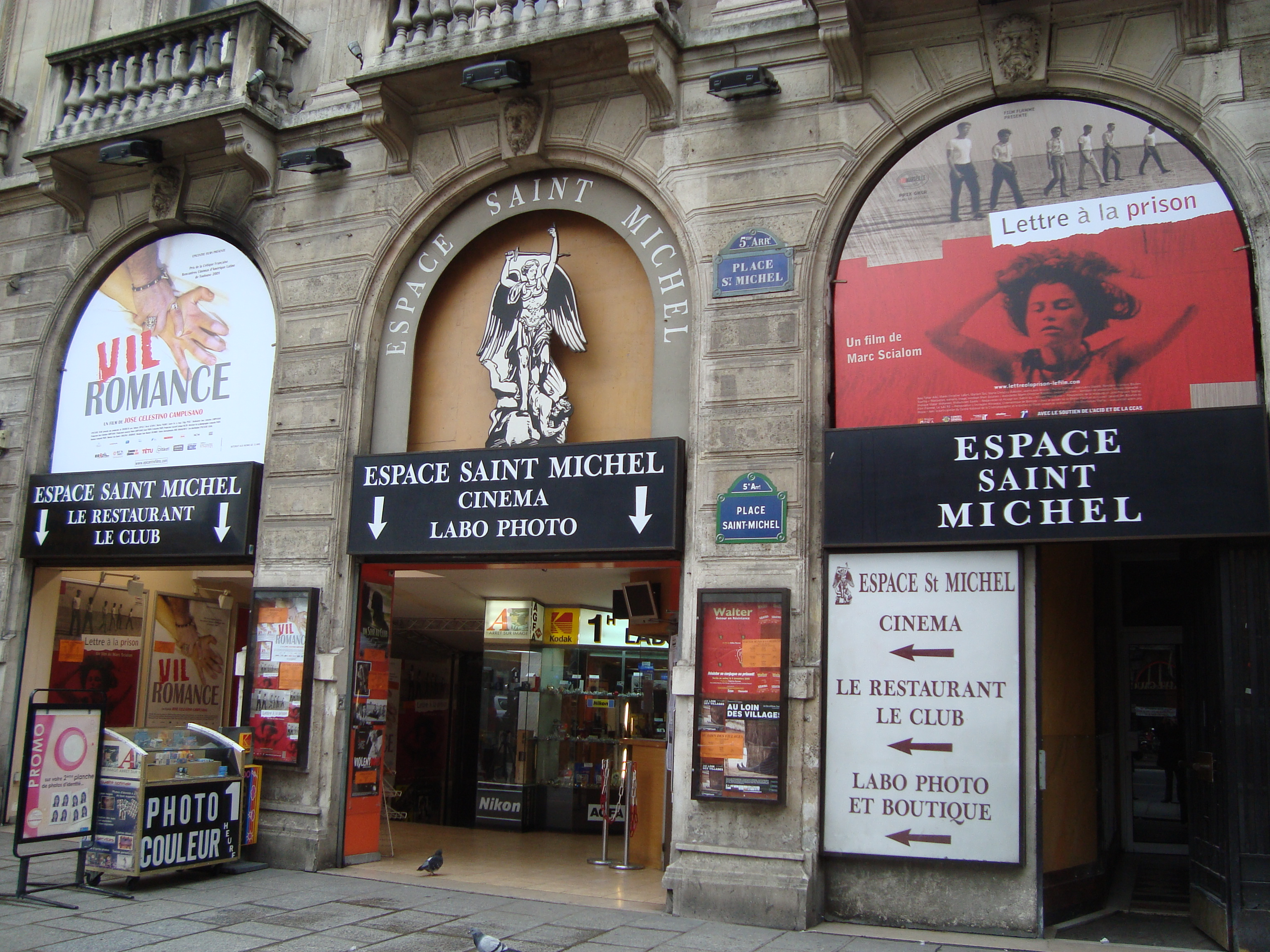
- Saint Michel cinema, Paris
- Location: 48.8526°N 2.3438°E; Saint-Michel cinema, 5th arrondissement of Paris, France
- Date: 22 October 1988; 9:45 pm
- Deaths: 0
- Injuries: 14
- Perpetrator: Right-wing Catholic extremists
- Motive: Integrism

On 22 October 1988, an integrist Catholic group set fire to the Saint Michel cinema in Paris while it was showing the film The Last Temptation of Christ. A little after midnight, an incendiary device ignited under a seat in the less supervised underground room, where a different film was being shown. The incendiary device consisted of a charge of potassium chlorate, triggered by a vial containing sulphuric acid.

The attack injured thirteen people, four of whom were severely burned. The Saint Michel cinema was heavily damaged, and reopened three years later after restoration. The Archbishop of Paris, Jean-Marie Lustiger, had previously condemned the film without having seen it; he also condemned the attack, calling the perpetrators "enemies of Christ".

The attack was subsequently blamed on a Christian fundamentalist group linked to Bernard Antony, a representative of the far-right Front National (NF) to the European Parliament in Strasbourg, and the excommunicated followers of Archbishop Marcel Lefebvre. Similar attacks against cinemas included graffiti, setting off tear-gas canisters and stink bombs, and assaulting filmgoers. At least nine people believed to be members of the Christian fundamentalist group were arrested. Five militants of a group called "General Alliance Against Racism and for Respect of the French and Christian Identity" (Alliance générale contre le racisme et pour le respect de l'identité française et chrétienne) were given suspended prison sentences of between 15 and 36 months, as well as a 450,000 franc fine for damages.

Rene Remond, a historian, said of the Christian far-right, "It is the toughest component of the National Front and it is motivated more by religion than by politics. It has a coherent political philosophy that has not changed for 200 years: it is the rejection of the revolution, of the republic and of modernism."

== See also ==
- Besançon courthouse attack
- January 2015 Île-de-France attacks
