= 2003 Nice bombing =

French bombing

- Part of the Corsican conflict
- Location: Nice, France
- Date: 20 July 2003; 2:30 am
- Target: Government buildings
- Attack type: Bombings
- Weapon: IEDs
- Deaths: 0
- Injuries: 16
- Perpetrator: National Liberation Front of Corsica

A double bomb attack took place in the city of Nice, France on 20 July 2003. Sixteen people were injured in the blasts against the regional directorates of customs and the treasury. The Corsican separatist National Liberation Front of Corsica (FLNC) claimed responsibility, and was one of the biggest bombs exploded by the group on the French mainland.

The attack came one week after the FLNC ended its seven-month ceasefire amid French government rejections about autonomy for Corsica. Tensions on the island had also increased following the arrest of militant member Yvan Colonna in June and the Corsican autonomy referendum on 6 July.

The FLNC also committed some other, albeit minor, attacks in Nice that year, including a bomb attack at a French military facility on 10 October.
