= September 1982 Paris car bombing =

Terrorist attack in Paris (1982)

- Location: 48.8839°N 2.3075°E; Rue Cardinet, Paris, France
- Date: 17 September 1982; 3:25 pm
- Attack type: Car bombing
- Deaths: 0
- Injuries: 51
- Perpetrator: Lebanese Armed Revolutionary Factions

In September 1982, a car bomb explosion injured 51 people. Responsibility for the attack was claimed by the Lebanese Armed Revolutionary Factions as an anti-Israeli act of terrorism.

== Bomb ==
At 3:25 p.m. on 17 September 1982, a car bomb exploded near Lycée Carnot in Paris, France. The bomb exploded when 61-year-old Amos Man-El, an Israeli diplomat started his car, a Peugeot 504, which was parked around the corner from an Israeli Embassy annex responsible for military purchasing. Witnesses to the explosion said that the car appeared to fly several feet off the ground when the bomb exploded. The driver was able to exit the car, but passengers in the front right seat and in the back seat were trapped in the vehicle until firefighters were able to extract them. A nearby motorbike was destroyed in the blast and a statement from the Israeli Embassy suggested that the bomb may have been in the bike's saddle bags. The attack happened on the eve of Rosh Hashanah and a few months after the Israeli invasion of Lebanon.

There were no fatalities in the explosion, but 51 people were injured, including many students at Lycée Carnot across the street who were injured by flying glass. A student reported that the blast had blown in the windows of the classrooms. The bomb exploded 20 minutes before the school was scheduled to get out, at which time there may have been as many as 500 students in the street.

An anonymous caller told a news agency that the attack was carried out by Lebanese Armed Revolutionary Factions (FARL) in the context of anti-Israeli terrorism. The FARL had previously committed the assassinations of American lieutenant colonel Charles R. Ray in January and that of Israeli diplomat Yacov Barsimantov in April, both of whom were shot dead in Paris, amongst other attacks - some of which were done with the assistance of the Action Directe group.

== See also ==
- List of terrorist incidents in France
