= January 2016 Paris police station attack =

Failed terrorist attack in Paris, France

- Location: 48.8851°N 2.3519°E; Paris, France
- Date: 7 January 2016; 10 years ago c. 11:30 (CET)
- Attack type: Failed attack
- Weapon: Cleaver
- Deaths: 1 (the perpetrator)
- Injuries: 0
- Perpetrator: Tarek Belgacem
- Motive: Islamist terrorism inspired by ISIL

On 7 January 2016 in Paris, a man wearing a fake explosive belt attacked police officers with a meat cleaver while shouting "Allahu Akbar!" He was shot and killed by officers when he failed to obey an order to stop.

The attempted attack took place on the first anniversary of the 2015 Charlie Hebdo shooting.

== Details ==
The failed attack occurred in the Goutte d'Or district where the population is predominantly of north African and sub-Saharan African origin. Belgacem shouted "Allahu Akbar" and pulled out a meat cleaver as he approached a guard at the local police station. He was shot and killed when he ignored orders to halt. His pocket contained a written rambling statement that included a drawing of an ISIS flag, and his pledge of allegiance to the caliphate.

French interior ministry spokesperson Pierre-Henry Brandet said that on the day of the attack, "a man attempted to attack a policeman at the reception of the police station before being hit by shots from the police." A bomb disposal team cleared the site, determining that the explosive vest the attacker wore was fake. News of the attempted attack came after President François Hollande addressed New Year's greetings to France's police and gendarmes, and called for greater cooperation between the security services.

== Perpetrator ==
Tarek Belgacem was identified by police in North Rhine-Westphalia as the attacker. He was a Tunisian native who migrated to the European Union via Romania in 2011. Initially, it was known that Belgacem had used at least seven aliases. It was later determined that he had a total of 20 identities in seven countries. He had been posing as an asylum-seeker from Iraq or Syria, and was living in a center for asylum-seekers in Recklinghausen, Germany, since August 2015. By 11 January, it was reported the suspect had surfaced in Germany in 2013 after living in France for five years. Police found an Arabic banner reading "Islamic State forever" on the wall of a communal kitchen in the center. At the site of the attack, Paris police officers found "a piece of paper on the man's body with the Muslim profession of faith, a drawing of the Islamic State of Iraq and the Levant (ISIL) flag and a pledge of allegiance to the extremist group's leader, Abu Bakr al-Baghdadi". The suspect was also carrying a cellphone with a German SIM card.

Belgacem drew attention to himself at the asylum center where he lived under false pretenses by drawing of the Black Flag of the Islamic State on the wall and by taking photographs of himself with an ISIS flag. He had been living in the asylum center since August 2015 under the name of Walid Salihi, one of his 20 aliases, and the name under which he applied for asylum in countries including Austria, Italy, Luxembourg, Switzerland, Germany, Sweden, and Romania.

== Aftermath ==
The attempted attack received widespread media attention, especially in Germany, due to the North Rhine-Westphalia police conducting several raids in refugee residences throughout the state following the attack and also hundreds of sexual assaults and thefts that occurred across the country on New Year's Eve. On 22 January the Recklinghausen residence, where Belgacem lived before the attack, was searched by the police. The police unsuccessfully tried to find evidence implicating Belgacem as a member of a terrorist cell. Though the attack was unsuccessful, it demonstrated a link between the migrant influx and terrorism, and that asylum seekers with criminal or terrorist intentions can enter Europe without problems and move freely within it. As with the Cologne incidents, the case involving Belgacem was expected to intensify the discussions on the handling of criminal asylum seekers.

Some German politicians and national organisations such as Deutscher Städte- und Gemeindebund (German Association of Towns and Municipalities) demanded better identification and unique registration of the refugees in order to crack down on immigrants living under multiple or false identities like Belgacem did. Uwe Jacob, the director of police in the German state of North Rhine-Westphalia, called for better coordination among EU police in tracking asylum seekers and preventing similar attacks in the future. The concern of the president of the Bundesamt für Verfassungsschutz (Federal Office for the Protection of the Constitution), Hans-Georg Maaßen, that terrorists mingled among the refugees proved true again on 4 February, during further police raids at refugee residences among others in Attendorn. In one such refugee residence, a 35-year-old alleged ISIL terrorist from Algeria was detained, who was reported to have planned a terror attack in Berlin, which was compared with the Recklinghausen case because both perpetrators used multiple identities. German police investigated 19 similar cases as well in February 2016.

In light of the attack, and a shooting on a U.S. police officer on the same day, officers of the New York City Police Department were instructed to "exercise heightened vigilance" and take "proactive measures".

Relatives of Belgacem have filed a suit in a French court alleging that the French police used undue force.

== See also ==
- 1986 Paris police station attack
- Murder of Samuel Paty
