= Algerian consulate bombing in Marseille =

1973 attack in Marseille, France

- Location: 43.2773°N 5.3836°E; Marseille, France
- Date: 14 December 1973
- Target: Algerian consulate
- Attack type: Bombing
- Deaths: 4
- Injuries: 23
- Perpetrator: Charles Martel Group

The Algerian consulate in Marseille, France, was bombed on 14 December 1973, killing four people and injuring 23 others, many of them seriously. Except for one Armenian, all victims were Algerian.

The attack was orchestrated by the Charles Martel Group, a far-right organisation made up of former Organisation armée secrète (OAS) members. It was their first attack. The bombing culminated a year which saw a high number of racist violence incidents against Algerians in the country, particularly in Marseille, which was mainly ignited by the murder of a local bus driver by a deranged Algerian youngster on 25 August 1973.

On 28 January 2018, a memorial plaque was placed on the consulate's entrance.

== See also ==
- 1980 Turkish Consulate attack in Lyon
