= 2015 Saint-Denis raid =

ISIL-DCPJ/RAID shootout near Paris

- Part of the aftermath of the November 2015 Paris attacks and Islamic terrorism in Europe
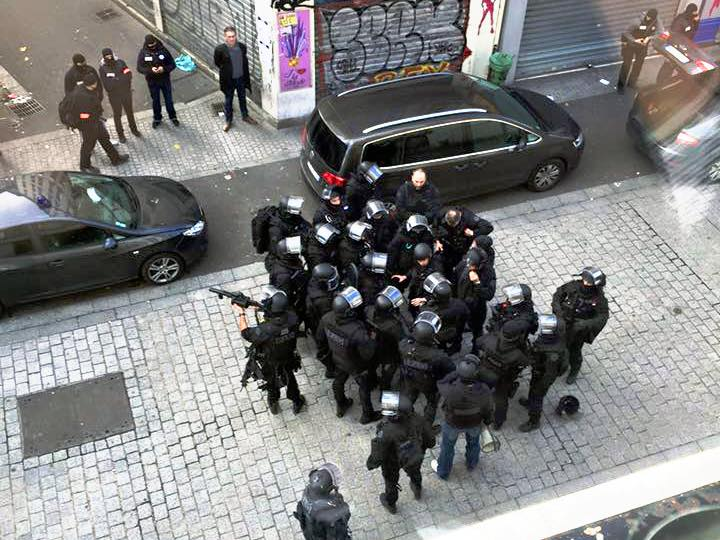
- Heavily armed police gather on Rue de la République, near the scene of the raid.
- Type: Police raid
- Location: Saint-Denis, France; 48.937628°N 2.353782°E
- Target: Abdelhamid Abaaoud
- Date: 18 November 2015; 04:16 – 11:26 (UTC+01:00)
- Executed by: Central Directorate of the Judicial Police (DCPJ); Research, Assistance, Intervention, Deterrence (RAID); French Army
- Outcome: 3 suspects killed; Abdelhamid Abaaoud, Hasna Aït Boulahcen and Chakib Akrouh killed; 5 captured; 1 police dog killed; 5 police officers injured; 1 civilian injured

On 18 November 2015, a police raid became a shootout between at least one hundred French police and soldiers and suspected terrorists belonging to Islamic State of Iraq and the Levant in the Paris suburb of Saint-Denis.

Following the November 2015 Paris attacks, French police identified Abdelhamid Abaaoud as the suspected mastermind of the attacks. After learning that a relative of Abaaoud might be located in Saint-Denis, police organised surveillance of and ultimately an assault on the location. The raid occurred in the morning of 18 November 2015, five days after the Paris attacks.

Police fired nearly 5,000 rounds during the raid, and French soldiers were reported to have used high-powered munitions on the apartment building, located on rue du Corbillon in Saint-Denis. Abaaoud, a woman named Hasna Aït Boulahcen, and Chakib Akrouh, reportedly a perpetrator in the Paris attacks and suicide bomber in Saint-Denis, were killed, and five people were arrested.

== Operation ==
In the early morning of 18 November 2015, French police, including Research, Assistance, Intervention, Deterrence (RAID), backed up by military units, launched an offensive in Saint-Denis against a building presumed to be the location of alleged Paris attacks mastermind Abdelhamid Abaaoud. The target was a building at 8 rue du Corbillon, less than 2 kilometres (1.2 mi) from the Stade de France where three suicide bombings took place on 13 November.

Police said a tip from Morocco had confirmed that Abaaoud was in France. They were aware that Hasna Aït Boulahcen, also of Moroccan origin and well-known to them as a suspect in a drug ring investigation during which her telephone was tapped, was an associate. They followed her to the rue du Corbillon apartment building on 17 November and viewed Abaaoud entering with her.

At 4:20 am the next morning, police launched the full-on assault of a second-story apartment in that Saint-Denis building, believing that Abaaoud was hiding there with at least five accomplices. The initial offensive was repelled by the terrorists. Explosives laid by police at the entrance were ineffective as the door was armoured, allowing the terrorists inside time to arm themselves and respond. At 5:55 am, several trucks arrived with reinforcements from France's military along with ambulances to treat the wounded. Deputy Mayor of Saint-Denis Stéphane Peu warned residents to stay indoors and that the explosions were a military operation.

At 6:27 am, two police helicopters arrived on the scene to support forces on the ground. At 6:55 am, additional police reinforcements arrived. Around 7:20 am, heavy gunfire erupted and multiple explosions, presumed to be police grenades, were heard by residents nearby. It was later reported that one of these explosions was a suicide bomber who had lured police to the building in an attempt to draw them into blast range. Riot police began to clear the streets of civilian onlookers who had gathered. At 7:45 am, at least 20 residents of nearby buildings were evacuated.

== Aftermath ==
The siege ended by 8:20 am. French officials then announced that at least two terrorists, including a suicide bomber, were killed and eight were captured. They said five police forces were injured and a Belgian shepherd police dog named Diesel was killed. Diesel had worked for the RAID unit for five of her seven years, and was the first RAID dog killed on duty. She was due to retire the next spring. It was not announced what caused these casualties. The building's third story collapsed due to the explosions, leaving the scene structurally unsafe for investigators.

According to Paris prosecutor Francois Molins, police fired nearly 5000 rounds during a gun battle that lasted about an hour.

On 19 November, the Paris prosecutor's office announced that Abaaoud was among those killed in the raid, and that he had been positively identified using fingerprints.

According to some reports, police located Abaaoud by tracking Aït Boulahcen's mobile phone once they determined through intelligence that the former was still in France. During police surveillance, they were observed entering the building on rue du Corbillon together on the evening before the raid.

The Belgian state broadcaster RTBF incorrectly reported that the suicide bomber was Hasna Aït Boulahcen, who was Abaaoud's cousin according to some reports, and claimed that this was the first incident of a suicide bombing by a female in France.

Subsequently, numerous media reports continued to indicate that Aït Boulahcen had died when she triggered a suicide bomb. On 20 November, however, the Paris prosecutor announced that the suicide bomber was an unidentified man, based on forensic examination of the remains. Aït Boulahcen died when the suicide bomber triggered the explosive vest. She had been a fan of Hayat Boumeddiene, a suspected accomplice of Boumeddiene's common law husband Amedy Coulibaly. Coulibaly was the main suspect for the Montrouge shooting in which municipal police officer Clarissa Jean-Philippe was shot and killed, and was also the hostage-taker and gunman in the Porte de Vincennes siege, where he killed four hostages and was himself killed by police. Aït Boulahcen had lauded Boumeddiene on Facebook.

According to one of her friends, Aït Boulahcen was a first cousin of Abaaoud and was smitten with him. She had helped Abaaoud after the Paris attacks and rented the Saint-Denis apartment the night before the raid.

French authorities later identified the suicide bomber as Chakib Akrouh based on DNA evidence. Akrouh, a Belgian-Moroccan dual citizen, had been one of the three perpetrators of gun attacks on cafes and restaurants during the Paris attacks.

Later reports concluded that the individuals in the building had only a handgun, not assault weapons as was originally reported, and that the terrorists had fired a total of 11 shots. Given that examination by the press of the protective equipment used by the police showed substantially more than 11 impacts, it appeared that in the confusion of the raid, much of the fire police encountered came from their colleagues. A news report in February concluded that "no terrorist was killed or even hit by the forces of order, two having been killed by the explosive belt activated by one of them, the third [Hasna Aït Boulahcen] having died asphyxiated under the debris."

In 2021, six years after the raid, it was announced that the building which was targeted during the raid would be demolished by the end of 2022 and the building would be rebuilt, in the past years the building had faced troubles in the past such as unpaid condominiums and fires which had previously struck the building. Since the assault, 47 households which had been living there (including 23 of them illegally), were removed from the building.

== See also ==
- 2015 Brussels lockdown
- 2015 anti-terrorism operations in Belgium (January)
