= La Grande Borne =

Housing estate in outskirts of Paris

Coordinates: 48°39′9″N 2°22′32″E

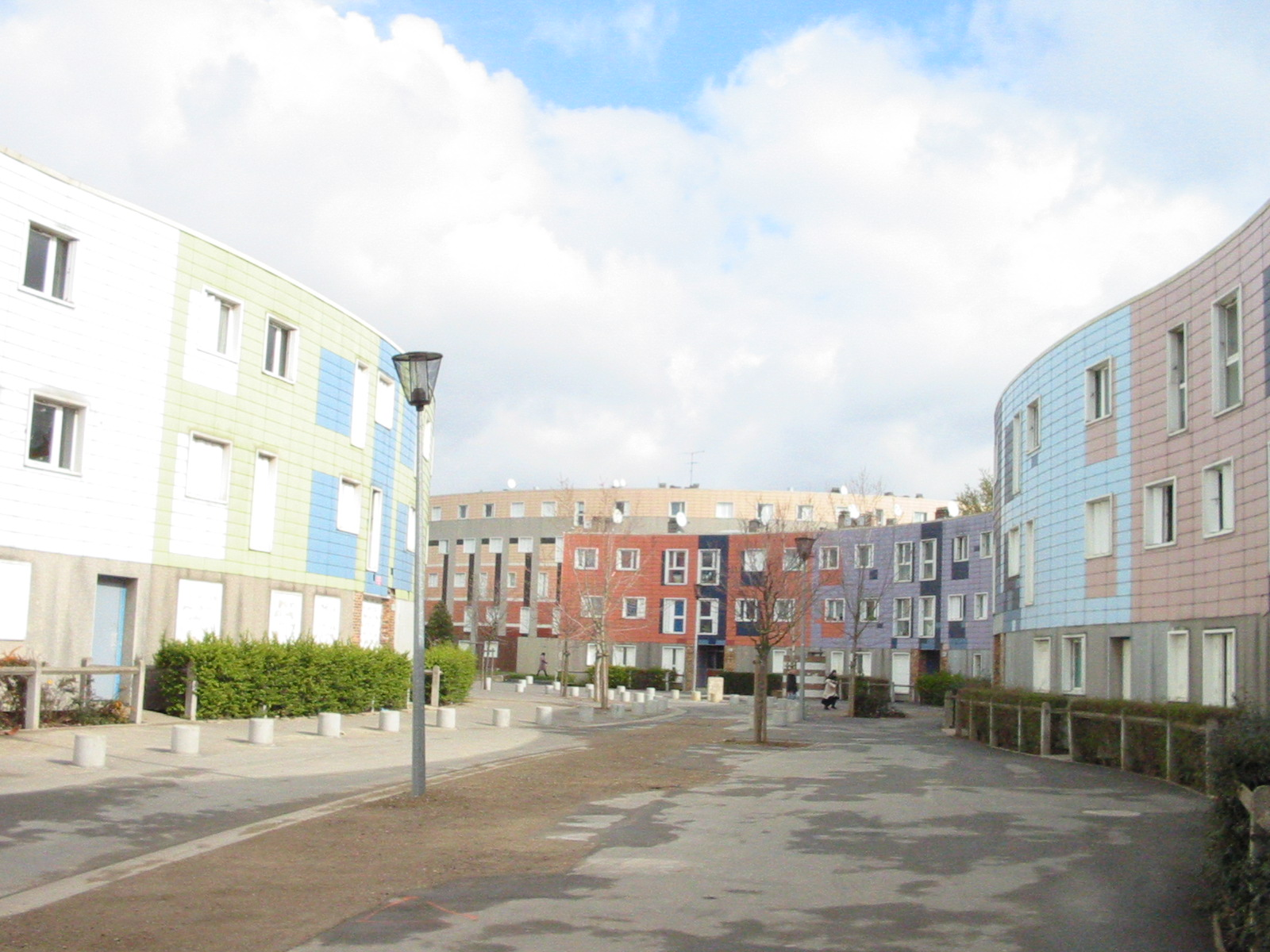
La rue du Labyrinthe, March 2007

La Grande Borne is a housing estate, in the Essonne département on the southern outskirts of Paris, France. The estate is located in both the communes of Grigny and Viry-Châtillon. The architect Émile Aillaud designed this housing estate.

== Notable residents ==
- Amedy Coulibaly, Islamist main suspect for the Montrouge shooting, and hostage-taker and gunman in the Porte de Vincennes hostage crisis
- Patrice Quarteron, born in 1979, a French super heavyweight kickboxer, has lived in this neighbourhood. He is two time French and European Muay Thai champion and current IKF Muay Thai Super Heavyweight World champion
