= Amedy Coulibaly =

Malian-French terrorist (1982–2015)

- Born: 27 February 1982; Juvisy-sur-Orge, Essonne, France
- Died: 9 January 2015 (aged 32); Paris, France
- Cause of death: Ballistic trauma
- Resting place: In Muslim section of cemetery in Thiais, France
- Other names: Abu Basir al-Ifriqi; Abou Bassir Abdallah al-Ifriqi; Doly Gringy
- Occupations: Unemployed; previously Coca-Cola worker
- Known for: Hypercacher Kosher Supermarket siege; Montrouge shooting
- Spouse: Hayat Boumeddiene
- Status: Convicted; Released early, in March 2014
- Allegiance: Islamic State
- Criminal charges: Robbery, drug trafficking, assisting plot to break out Islamist terrorist from prison (December 2013)
- Penalty: Five years in prison
- Capture status: Killed
- Accomplice: Saïd and Chérif Kouachi

Details
- Date: 7–9 January 2015
- Locations: Porte de Vincennes; Montrouge; Fontenay-aux-Roses
- Targets: Patrons of kosher supermarket; Police officer
- Killed: 5
- Injured: 11
- Weapons: Sport compact vz. 58 assault rifle; vz. 58 assault rifle; Two Tokarev pistols

Amedy Coulibaly (French pronunciation: [amɛdi kulibali]; 27 February 1982 – 9 January 2015), also known by the nom de guerre (kunya) Abu Basir al-Ifriqi (Arabic: أبو بصير الإفريقي) was a Malian-French man who was the prime suspect in the Montrouge shooting, in which municipal police officer Clarissa Jean-Philippe was shot and killed, and was the hostage-taker and gunman in the Hypercacher kosher supermarket siege, in which he killed four hostages before being fatally shot by police.

He was a close friend of Saïd and Chérif Kouachi, the gunmen in the Charlie Hebdo shooting, to which Coulibaly's shootings were connected. He said he synchronized his attacks with the Kouachi brothers. Coulibaly had pledged allegiance to the Islamic State.

== Early life ==
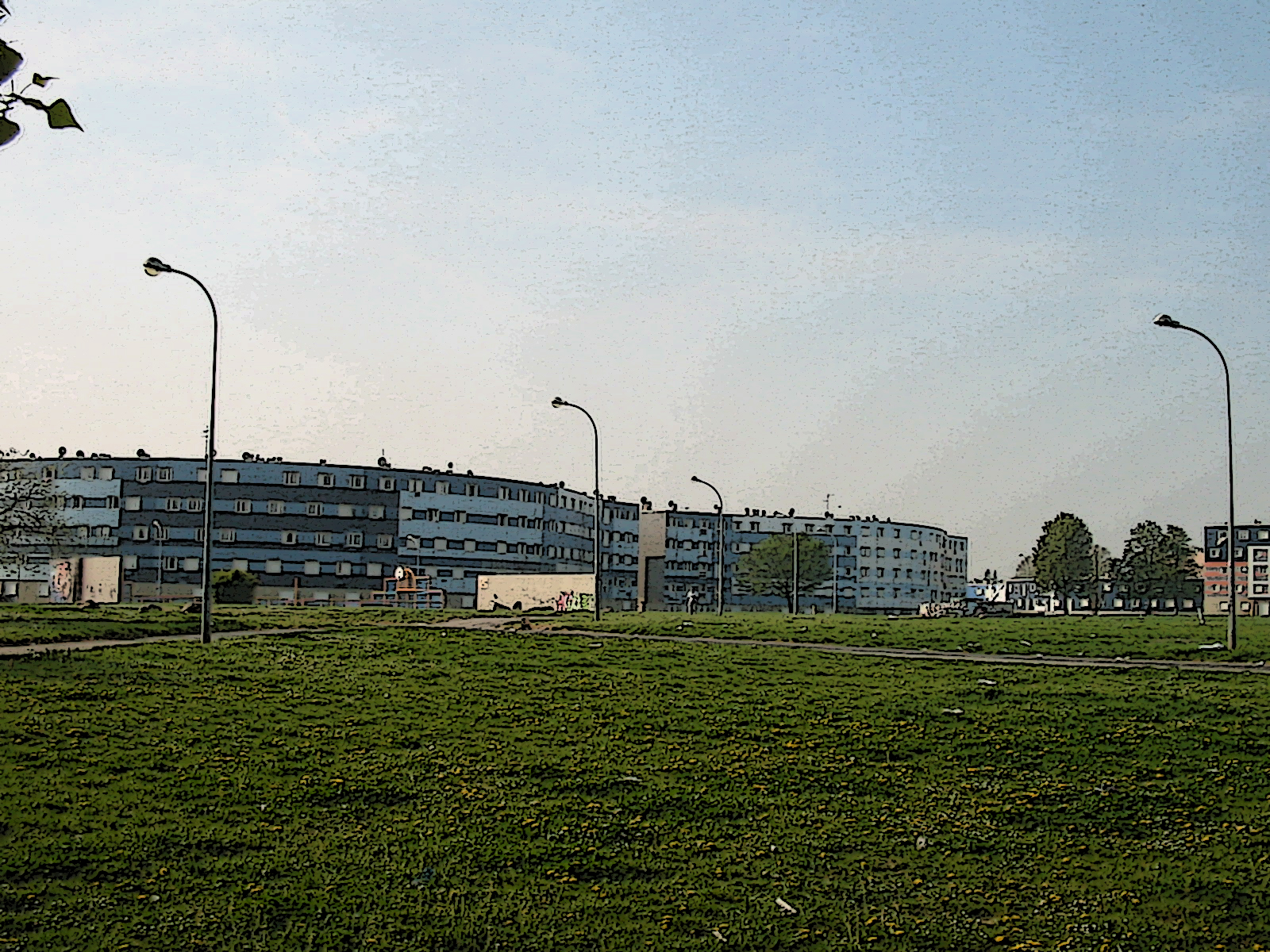
Coulibaly grew up on La Grande Borne housing estate.

Coulibaly was born in Juvisy-sur-Orge, a suburb south-east of Paris, into a Malian Muslim immigrant family. He was the only boy, with nine sisters. He grew up on a housing estate, La Grande Borne, in Grigny, south of Paris.

Starting at the age of 17, he was convicted five times for armed robbery and at least once for drug trafficking. A report by a psychiatric expert prepared for a Parisian court found Coulibaly had an "immature and psychopathic personality" and "poor powers of introspection."

== Activities prior to 2015 shootings ==
In 2004, Coulibaly was sentenced to six years in Fleury-Mérogis Prison for armed bank robbery. There, he met Chérif Kouachi. He is believed to have converted to radical Islam in prison at the same time as Chérif. In prison he also met al-Qaeda recruiter Djamel Beghal, who was in "isolation" in the cell above him but whom he was nevertheless able to communicate with. He later said that his discovery of Islam in prison changed him.

In 2007, he met and began dating Hayat Boumeddiene. On 5 July 2009, they got married in an Islamic religious ceremony. Boumeddiene's father stood in for her at the marriage service. On 15 July 2009, while involved in an effort promoting youth employment, Coulibaly, along with about 500 others, met with then-President Nicolas Sarkozy.

A source stated that Coulibaly "was friends of both of" the Kouachi brothers, and that he had first met Cherif in prison. Coulibaly and the Kouachi brothers were known members of the "Buttes-Chaumont network". The name comes from the nearby Parc des Buttes Chaumont, where they often met and performed military-style training exercises with other French-Algerian extremists. Coulibaly is believed to have been radicalised by an Islamic preacher in Paris, and had expressed a desire to fight in either Iraq or Syria.

Ten months after his meeting with Sarkozy, in May 2010 police arrested him and searched his apartment. They found ammunition, a crossbow, and letters seeking false official documents. Coulibaly maintained that he was planning to sell the ammunition on the street. In December 2013 he was sentenced to five years in prison for supplying ammunition for a plot to break out from prison radical French-Algerian Islamist Smain Ait Ali Belkacem (who had planned the 1995 Paris Métro and RER bombings), a plot in which the Kouachi brothers were also involved. However, Coulibaly was released early from Villepinte prison outside Paris, in March 2014. He was required to wear an electronic bracelet until May 2014.

In October 2014, he and Boumeddiene went to perform the Hajj in Mecca, the pilgrimage obligatory for every Muslim who is able to do so.

A week before the attacks, on 4 January 2015 Coulibaly rented a house in Gentilly, Val-de-Marne, in the southern Paris suburbs. There, after the attacks, police discovered automatic weapons, a grenade launcher, smoke grenades and bombs, handguns, industrial explosives, and flags of the Islamic State.

He had pledged allegiance to Abu Bakr al-Baghdadi and the Islamic State, as he put it, "as soon as the caliphate was declared," which was in the summer of 2014. He stated this, and described how he and the Kouachi brothers had synchronized their attacks and were "a team, in league together," in a video posted on Twitter days after he and the brothers were killed. Text in the video states that Coulibaly had killed a policewoman and "five Jews." The video captions him with the names "Amedy Coulibaly" and "Abou Bassir Abdallah al-Ifriqi." As the video includes news reports of his attack on the kosher supermarket, it was edited by someone after he was killed.

== Shootings on 7–9 January 2015 ==
Coulibaly said he synchronized his attacks with the Kouachi brothers. In the shootings, five people were killed and eleven others were wounded.

The first shooting was of a jogger who was wounded on the evening of 7 January in Fontenay-aux-Roses. Shell casings found at the scene were later linked to the weapon carried by Coulibaly in his kosher supermarket attack. However, the jogger denied Coulibaly's involvement and recognized Amar Ramdani, a friend of Coulibaly, as the gunman.

The second shooting occurred in Montrouge on 8 January. Clarissa Jean-Philippe, a policewoman, was killed, and a street sweeper was critically injured. DNA found at the scene was a match to Coulibaly.

The third shooting took place at Porte de Vincennes, east Paris, on 9 January. Coulibaly killed four more people, all Jewish patrons at a Jewish Hypercacher supermarket at Porte de Vincennes, at the outset of an hours-long siege in which he demanded that the Kouachi brothers be freed. At the outset of that attack, he introduced himself to his hostages, saying: "I am Amedy Coulibaly, Malian and Muslim. I belong to the Islamic State." French commandos stormed the store, and killed Coulibaly. A Nagant M1895 revolver was also found in the possession of Coulibaly.

== Aftermath ==
After Mali refused to accept Coulibaly's body for burial, he was buried in an unmarked grave in the Muslim section of a cemetery in Thiais.

His wife, Hayat Boumeddiene, is currently being sought by French police as a suspected accomplice of Coulibaly, alleged to have helped him commit his attacks. She arrived in Turkey five days before the attacks. She has been described by newspapers as "France's most wanted woman." She was last tracked on 10 January 2015 to the Islamic State-controlled border town of Tell Abyad in Syria. In early March 2019, Dorothee Maquere – wife of French jihadist Fabien Clain – claimed that Boumeddiene was killed during the Battle of Baghuz Fawqani due to injuries sustained from an airstrike on her safehouse.

In March 2020, a French jihadist woman told a judge that she met Boumeddiene in October 2019 at the Al Howl camp; Boumeddiene was staying under a false identity and managed to escape. French intelligence services think that this piece of information is plausible.

== See also ==
- Sub-Saharan African community of Paris
