= Conversion to Islam in prisons =

Modern phenomenon of prisoner religious conversion

Conversion to Islam in prisons refers to the modern phenomenon seen in the Western world of a statistically high incidence of incarcerated criminal non-Muslims converting to Islam while in the prison system. In the decade preceding 2014, the number of conversions to Islam among prisoners in Western countries outpaced all other religions, with the overall imprisoned Muslim population (jailhouse converts to Islam plus inmates who entered the prison system as Muslims) growing as a result.

Although many prisoners find religion during their time in custody, the phenomenon of conversion to Islam in prisons is of particular discussion among academics, government and social services.

== Growth and impact of prison conversions ==
In some regions, a significant proportion of the growth of the Muslim population through conversion has been attributed to prison conversions specifically, rather than conversions of persons from the general non-incarcerated population. In the United Kingdom, for instance, the country's total Muslim population exceeded over 3 million in 2016, though that constituted only around 4.8% of the general UK population. Nevertheless, the proportion of UK prisoners who were Muslims in 2016 was 15%. Some of this can be explained by the increasing number of foreign national prisoners in UK jails. In 2013, a Ministry of Justice analysis suggested that a significant number of Muslim prisoners weren't British, but were from overseas countries that were predominately Muslim such as Pakistan and Somalia. As of 2021, Albanians, who are mostly Muslims, form the largest group of foreign nationals in UK prisons.

Of the millions of Muslims in the general UK population in 2011, only 5,000 were persons who converted to Islam that year. Yet in that same year "[a]round 30% of Muslim inmates are converts [to Islam...] and many of those are, according to previous Home Office research, from black" ethnic backgrounds. In 1999, it was found that in the United Kingdom "37% of Muslim male prisoners were black Muslims compared with 7% [Black Muslims] in the wider (British Muslim) population," with most Black Muslim inmates being converts to Islam. Meanwhile, "less than 1% of [British] Black Caribbeans are Muslims generally, in jail the figure is almost 19%." However, the majority of Muslim prisoners in UK jails are immigrants from Asia, the Middle East and North Africa, an increasing number of Muslim inmates are converts to Islam.

== Australia ==
Muslims are over-represented in Australian prisons, with increasing numbers of inmates undergoing jailhouse conversions.

In 2015, within Victoria and NSW, 8 per cent and 9 per cent of the respective prison populations identify as Muslim, compared with 2.2 per cent and 3 per cent of the general populations. Prison employees, who spoke confidentially to The Weekend Australian, say they are seeing increasing numbers of white and Aboriginal prisoners converting to Islam in jail.

In April 2017, it was reported that most inmates in NSW's Supermax Prison (High Risk Management Correctional Centre) were Muslim, with only a handful of non-Muslims. Located 195 km southwest of Sydney, the prison is often referred to as "Super mosque". Of the Muslim inmates in Supermax, those serving sentences for non-terrorism related violent criminal offences (including murder, etc) are largely inmates "who converted to Islam behind bars". The Australian reported that "Islam has become an obsession for the violent inmates [...] inside Supermax".

In 2017, ABC News reported that some inmates in NSW's jails were forcing other prisoners to convert to Islam against their will.

In 2018, various Australian academics and experts claimed that prison conversions can have a positive influence, giving inmates structure, hope and a path to rehabilitation.

== France ==
In France, where ethnic and religious statistics are forbidden, prison administration confirmed that 25.8% of all prisoners asked for "special measures" during Ramadan in 2017. According to estimates, based on country of origin of migrants in France, around 9% of the general population is from an Islamic background.

== United Kingdom ==
According to "Muslim Prisoners' Experiences" report by Chief Inspector of Prisons, Dame Anne Owers, conversion to Islam in prisons in the United Kingdom is attributed to converts seeking "support and protection in a group with a powerful identity" and "perceptions of material advantages of identifying as Muslim" in prison, including perks or "material benefits" available only to Muslims "such as more time out of their cell and better food during Ramadan if they become Muslim".

According to the UK prison officers' union in 2013, some Muslim prisoners in the UK had allegedly forcibly converted fellow inmates to Islam in prisons. There have been multiple cases of non-Muslim prisoners threatened with violence with "convert or get hurt" being a commonly used phrase by Muslim gangs according to an independent report published by the government.

A 2010 report by the Chief Inspector of Prisons stated that 30% of the Muslim prisoners interviewed had converted to Islam while in prison, some of whom were "convenience Muslims" who adopted the religion in order to get benefits available only to Muslims. Other reasons why inmates may convert include wanting protection in wings where Muslim gangs are prevalent, the ability to go to chapel, and access to different foods. Around one in five Muslim prisoners in the UK are now white.

In category A and B prisons, former inmates have publicly spoken out on the rise of Islamism with the "balance of power" in reputational violence now shifted towards Muslim gangs. Prisoners who refuse to convert or who stand up to Islamic gangs are at risk of being attacked and face death threats. Some prisons have been unable to cope with the rise of Islamic gangs, and have opted to place threatened inmates into isolation units for their own safety.

In 2017, UKIP proposed a policy of Muslim only prisons, as a way to stop the promotion of extremism or the forced conversion of non-Islamic prisoners.

== United States ==
Conversion to Islam in US prisons started with Black supremacy organizations such as the Nation of Islam and 5 Percenters. In the years between 2001 and 2014 a study estimated that a quarter of a million U.S. convicts converted to Islam in the U.S. prison system, making prison converts to Islam from those years account for a significant proportion of all Muslims in the United States overall.

In 2011, Pew Research Center data estimated that Muslims made up 9% of the 1,598,780 United States inmates in state and federal prisons despite Muslims being only 0.8% of the general U.S. population in the year prior.

Muslims prisoners have been characterized as a danger or threat for radicalization in the media. For example, Indiana State University professor Mark Hamm stated in an interview with Fox News, "it is not the sheer number of prisoners following extremist interpretations of religious doctrines that poses a threat, rather, it is the potential for the single individual to become radicalized." Conversely, according to the National Institute of Corrections, despite the fact of there being over 350,000 Muslim inmates in the United States, there is little evidence indicating widespread radicalization or foreign recruitment. In addition, the positive aspects of conversion are often overlooked, such as supporting inmate rehabilitation.

== See also ==
- Christian Identity interpretations of Christianity among some prison gangs in Western countries.
- Prison gang
- Islamist radicalization in European prisons
