= Hayat Boumeddiene =

French terrorist and fugitive (born 1988)

- Born: 26 June 1988 (age 38); Villiers-sur-Marne, Val-de-Marne, France
- Disappeared: 10 January 2015 (aged 26); Tell Abyad, Syria
- Other name: Umm Basir al-Muhajirah
- Known for: Suspected accomplice of Amedy Coulibaly
- Criminal status: Wanted by France since January 2015
- Spouse(s): Amedy Coulibaly (2009–2015; his death)

Hayat Boumeddiene (born 26 June 1988), also known by the nom de guerre Umm Basir al-Muhajirah is a French terrorist and fugitive who participated in the January 2015 Île-de-France attacks. Currently at large, she is wanted as an accomplice of her partner, Amedy Coulibaly, who perpetrated the Montrouge shooting and the Porte de Vincennes siege.

According to Coulibaly's attorney, Boumeddiene was the more radical of the two. She arrived in Turkey five days before the attacks, was described by newspapers as "France's most wanted woman," and was last tracked on 10 January 2015 to the Islamic State-controlled border town of Tell Abyad in Syria.

Hasna Aït Boulahcen, who was killed in the later Paris attacks, was a fan of Boumeddiene and lauded her on Facebook. While still a fugitive, Boumeddiene was convicted in absentia by a French court in December 2020 and given a 30-year prison sentence.

== Biography ==
Boumeddiene was born into an Algerian immigrant family of seven children, in Villiers-sur-Marne in the eastern suburbs of Paris. Her mother died when Boumeddiene was 8. She and some of her siblings were subsequently taken into foster care. Her father was an infrequent visitor, even more so apparently after he remarried when she was 12. She told detectives that she changed carers numerous times because she was beaten often. An investigative source said she altered her surname in her teenage years to "make it sound more French." Boumeddiene was employed as a cashier in 2007 when she met and began dating Coulibaly in Juvisy-sur-Orge, southeast of Paris. On 5 July 2009, they wed in an Islamic religious ceremony. She and Coulibaly lived in Bagneux, a southern suburb of Paris, and were very religious.

In 2010, during four days of questioning after police discovered large amounts of assault rifle ammunition in their flat, Boumeddiene told counter-terrorism officers that she saw some terrorist attacks as justifiable. She told investigators that she and Coulibaly had visited French-Algerian jihadist terrorist Djamel Beghal "for crossbow practice."

In October 2014, she and Coulibaly went to perform the Hajj in Mecca, the pilgrimage obligatory for every Muslim who is able to do so. After the couple's return from Hajj, Boumeddiene told her friends it had been "an amazing journey, spiritually speaking" and "a way to fight away everything that is evil within us." She began wearing the full veil and discussing jihad. Police say Boumeddiene was frequently in contact with Chérif Kouachi's wife, including 500 calls between them in 2014. She and Coulibaly disappeared in December 2014. After the Charlie Hebdo shooting, investigators found an Islamic State flag in the flat she shared with Coulibaly.

== Escape and manhunt ==
According to Spanish authorities, Coulibaly drove Boumeddiene from France to Madrid, Spain, on 31 December 2014, and stayed with her until 2 January 2015. According to Turkish authorities, on 2 January 2015 Boumeddiene flew from Madrid to Istanbul, Turkey, with 23-year-old Mahdi Sabri Belhoucine, a French citizen of North African origin whose brother Mohammed was convicted of terrorism charges in 2010 in France and imprisoned for a year in Villepinte prison, and both had return tickets dated 9 January which, however, they never used.

Due to her "suspicious behavior," Turkey's intelligence agency (the National Intelligence Organisation (MİT)) put her under surveillance, following her movements for two days, listening to her cellphone conversations, and tracking her cellphone until she left Turkey. While in Turkey, the two stayed at a hotel in Istanbul in adjoining rooms, according to Turkish Foreign Affairs Minister Mevlüt Çavuşoğlu. Turkish officials said she and Mahdi Sabri Belhoucine left Istanbul for Şanlıurfa in southeastern Turkey close to the Syrian border on 4 January. They stayed there four days, during which time Boumeddiene phoned France several times.

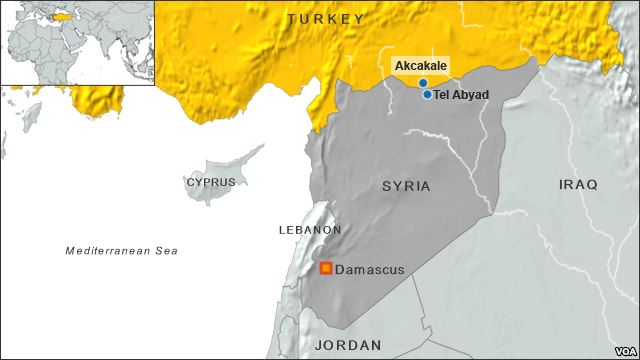
Map of Akçakale, Turkey, and Tell Abyad, Syria, where Boumeddiene was last tracked

Boumeddiene is believed to have then crossed the Syria–Turkey border into Syria with Sabri on 8 January, on the day Coulibaly shot and killed a policewoman, using her car in the attack. Çavuşoğlu said: "We understand this thanks to telephone recordings." The last recorded phone call from her was on 10 January, from the Islamic State-controlled town of Tell Abyad in Syria, close to the border and directly across it from Akçakale. The New York Times stated that she "is reported to have fled abroad, possibly to Syria to try and join the Islamic State, to which Mr. Coulibaly declared allegiance."

Boumeddiene is currently being sought in connection with having allegedly helped Coulibaly commit his attacks, and has been described by newspapers as "France's most wanted woman."

She is described by French police as "armed and extremely dangerous," having trained to use firearms, and is on the run. A French police official said Boumeddiene is part of a terrorist cell of about eight people.

In February 2015, French authorities were investigating whether a woman in a video released 3 February by French-speaking IS fighters might be Boumeddiene. The video, titled Blow Up France 2, shows a woman standing next to the IS speaker, wearing camouflage clothing and holding a weapon. A French-language IS magazine believed to have been produced by the Al-Hayat Media Center, praised her in a long interview, in which she was asked for she felt about being in the "land of the Califat". She replied that she was "relieved to have fulfilled this obligation." Hasna Aït Boulahcen who was killed in the Paris attacks was a fan of Boumeddiene and lauded her on Facebook.

In March 2019, Dorothée Maquere – sister-in-law of Fabien Clain – claimed Boumeddiene was killed in late February during the Battle of Baghuz Fawqani when an airstrike struck an Islamic State safehouse containing various French jihadists. These claims were corroborated by other evacuees, however, they could not be confirmed.

In March 2020, a French jihadist woman told a judge that she met Boumeddiene in October 2019 at the Al Howl camp; Boumeddiene was staying under a false identity and managed to escape.

== French conviction and sentencing ==
On 16 December 2020, a French court convicted Boumeddiene in absentia of financing terrorism and belonging to a criminal terrorist network and sentenced her to 30 years in jail.

== See also ==
- List of fugitives from justice who disappeared
- Brides of the Islamic State
- Malika al-Aroud
- Samantha Lewthwaite
