= Djamel Beghal =

Algerian terrorist convict (born 1965)

- Born: 2 December 1965 (age 60); Bordj Bou Arréridj, Algeria
- Citizenship: French (revoked)

Djamel Beghal (also transliterated as Jamel Beghal and Djemal Begal) (Arabic: جمال بغال; born 2 December 1965) is an Algerian convicted terrorist.

He is a former French citizen. He married Sylvie, a French citizen, in 1990, while working as a youth worker in Corbeil-Essonnes. In 1997, he moved his family to Leicester, where Sylvie still lives with their four children.

On 28 July 2001, he was arrested at Dubai International Airport while transferring from a flight from Pakistan to a flight to Europe; he held a fake French passport. Over the next two months, he was interrogated by the Emirati police. CAGE, a London-based Islamic activist organization, claimed that Emirati police tortured Beghal during questioning and accused the British and French governments of 'complicity'. No evidence was offered to substantiate those claims other than the testimony of Beghal himself. Beghal confessed to UAE authorities that he was conspiring to destroy the U.S. embassy in Paris. His confession doomed the plot. After he was extradited to France on 1 October, Beghal retracted his statement, saying that it had been given under torture.

In October 2001, Beghal told magistrate Jean-Louis Bruguière that he had visited Osama bin Laden's base in Afghanistan and planned a suicide bomb attack.

In March 2005, French authorities convicted Beghal and five others for planning the attacks, and Beghal began serving his 10-year sentence. During his time in prison, he met and mentored fellow prisoners Chérif Kouachi, one of the two brothers who committed the 2015 Charlie Hebdo shooting, as well as Amedy Coulibaly, who carried out the Fontenay-aux-Roses shooting and Porte de Vincennes siege. Stripped in 2006 of the French citizenship which he had acquired through his marriage, Beghal was released from prison and deported to Algeria on 16 July 2018.
