= Émile Aillaud =

French architect

Émile Aillaud (French pronunciation: [emil ajo]; 18 January 1902 – 29 December 1988) was a French architect who was born in Mexico City and died in Paris.

His designs can be found after World War II in France, such as Les Courtilières in Pantin (1955–1956, 1957–1960), Wiesberg at Forbach (1959, 1961 ff.) and La Grande Borne at Grigny (1964–1971), are representative of the attempts to compensate for the uniformity which resulted from extensively industrialized constructional methods (principally heavy construction employing prefabricated reinforced-concrete panels) by adopting more individualizing urban planning strategies.

This is chiefly achieved in the overall arrangement of the building masses, reduced to smooth abstract forms, in curved serpentine compositions; through the integration of works of art; and finally through the careful handling of public spaces, at times eccentrically shaped and colourfully treated. The residents are thereby given an impetus to identify with their environment. These principles were employed by Aigner for public housing at La Noé, Chateauloup-les-Vignes and the Quartier Picasso in Nanterre.

== Bibliography ==
- Émile Aillaud, Desordre apparent, ordre caché, Librarie Artheme Fayard, Paris, 1975. ISBN 2-213-00264-9
- Émile Aillaud, Chanteloup les Vignes, Librarie Artheme Fayard, Paris, 1978. ISBN 2-213-00638-5
- Gerald Gassiot-Talabot, Alain Devy, La Grande Borne, Librarie Hachette, Paris, 1972.
