= Hypercacher =

Kosher supermarket chain

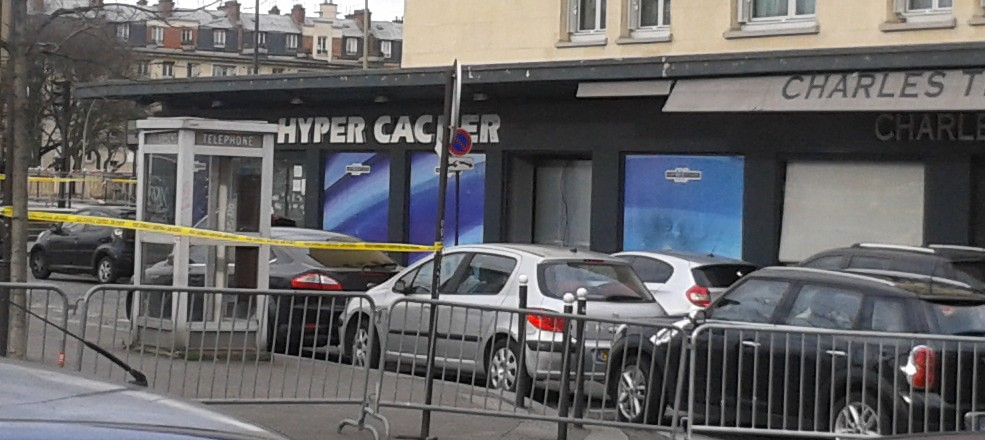
The Hypercacher superette at Porte de Vincennes after the terrorist attack on 9 January 2015

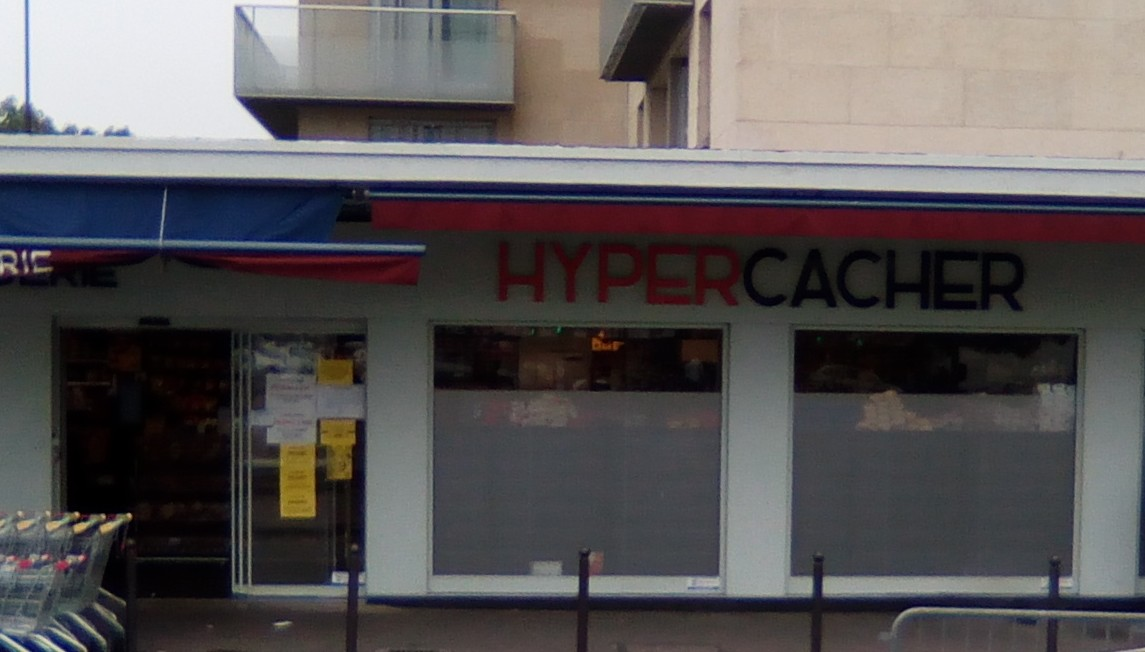
The superette in June 2016

Hypercacher (pronounced [ipɛʁkaʃɛʁ]; also Hyper Cacher or HyperCacher; translated as "Hyper Kosher") is a chain of kosher supermarkets in France and Italy.

There are branches in and around Paris (Porte de Vincennes, rue de Manin, rue de l'Ourcq, La Villette, rue Bayen, rue Jean-de-la-La-Fontaine, Montreuil, Créteil, Sarcelles, Saint Gratien), as well as in Nice and Rome.

== History ==
The first branch was opened in March 1992 in Montreuil, and branches have been opened from that date until 2013. The company's president is Michel Emsalem.

On 9 January 2015, Islamist terrorist Amedy Coulibaly held several hostages at gunpoint at the Porte de Vincennes branch in the eastern suburbs of Paris. Four hostages were murdered by Coulibaly, who was then killed by police.

Some of those saved were saved by Lassana Bathily, a Muslim of Malian descent, who hid them in the basement of the shop.
