= Diesel (dog) =

Assault dog employed by the French police

- Species: Canis lupus familiaris
- Breed: Belgian Shepherd
- Sex: Female
- Born: 2007 or 2008
- Died: 18 November 2015 (aged 7-8)

Diesel was a seven-year-old Malinois (Belgian Shepherd) RAID assault dog employed by the French police.

== Working career ==
Diesel had worked for the RAID unit for five of her seven years, and was the first RAID dog killed on duty. She was due to retire in spring 2016. On 18 November 2015, Diesel was killed in a shootout with suspected terrorists in the Saint-Denis area of Paris, while searching for suspects involved in the November 2015 Paris attacks. During the raid, which was in response to the Paris attacks, the dog had been sent in to clear rooms following a cessation of gunfire from the suspects. The first room was empty, but after she entered a second room, the gunfire started once more. She died of multiple gunshot wounds. Following the raid, some media reports claimed that Diesel had been killed by a female suicide bomber. This was later shown to have been incorrect as there was no female bomber. Diesel "was saluted for her bravery by the Paris police chiefs who told Le Parisien [...] that dog almost certainly saved her handler’s life during the raid."

== Legacy ==
Tributes to Diesel on social media were extensive, under the hashtags #JeSuisDiesel or #JeSuisChien. Shortly after Diesel's death, the Russian interior ministry sent a replacement puppy Dobrynya (named after the bogatyr, Dobrynya Nikitich) as a sign of solidarity with France.

On 28 December, the People's Dispensary for Sick Animals (PDSA), a veterinary charity in the United Kingdom, announced that Diesel was to be posthumously awarded the Dickin Medal for bravery. It is considered to be the animal equivalent of the Victoria Cross, and it will be the 68th time that the medal has been awarded.

== See also ==
- List of individual dogs
