= Islamist radicalization in European prisons =

Radicalization is the persuasion into and recruitment of young people to Islamism and violent jihad. Young men serving time in European prisons are especially vulnerable to radicalization.

== Prison social order ==
Famous terrorists such as Salah Abdeslam are at the top of the "social pecking order" in prisons in western Europe. Lesser known Islamists use their prison terms as opportunities for recruiting young men, particularly young Muslims, to commit to Islamism and the violent jihad of terror attacks. The Islamist recruiters offer young petty criminals a "sense of purpose."

== By country ==
=== Belgium ===
Islamists recruited young prisoners by talking to them through cell windows and in exercise yards about the unjust treatment of immigrants in Europe and the Muslims killed in the Western invasion of Iraq.

=== France ===
A French government audit of the prison system described radical Islamists as constituting a sort of prison "aristocracy," governing fellow inmates by forbidding them to listen to music, shower, or watch a women's sports event on television. They possess cell phones and are in regular contact with fellow Islamists both in Europe and in the Middle East.

The terrorist who perpetrated the Jewish Museum of Belgium attack was radicalized in a French prison, as was mass murderer Amedy Coulibaly. Coulibaly planned his crime with Chérif Kouachi, whom he met while imprisoned in Fleury-Mérogis Prison.

== See also ==
- Deradicalization
