= January 2015 Île-de-France attacks =

Islamic terrorist attacks in France

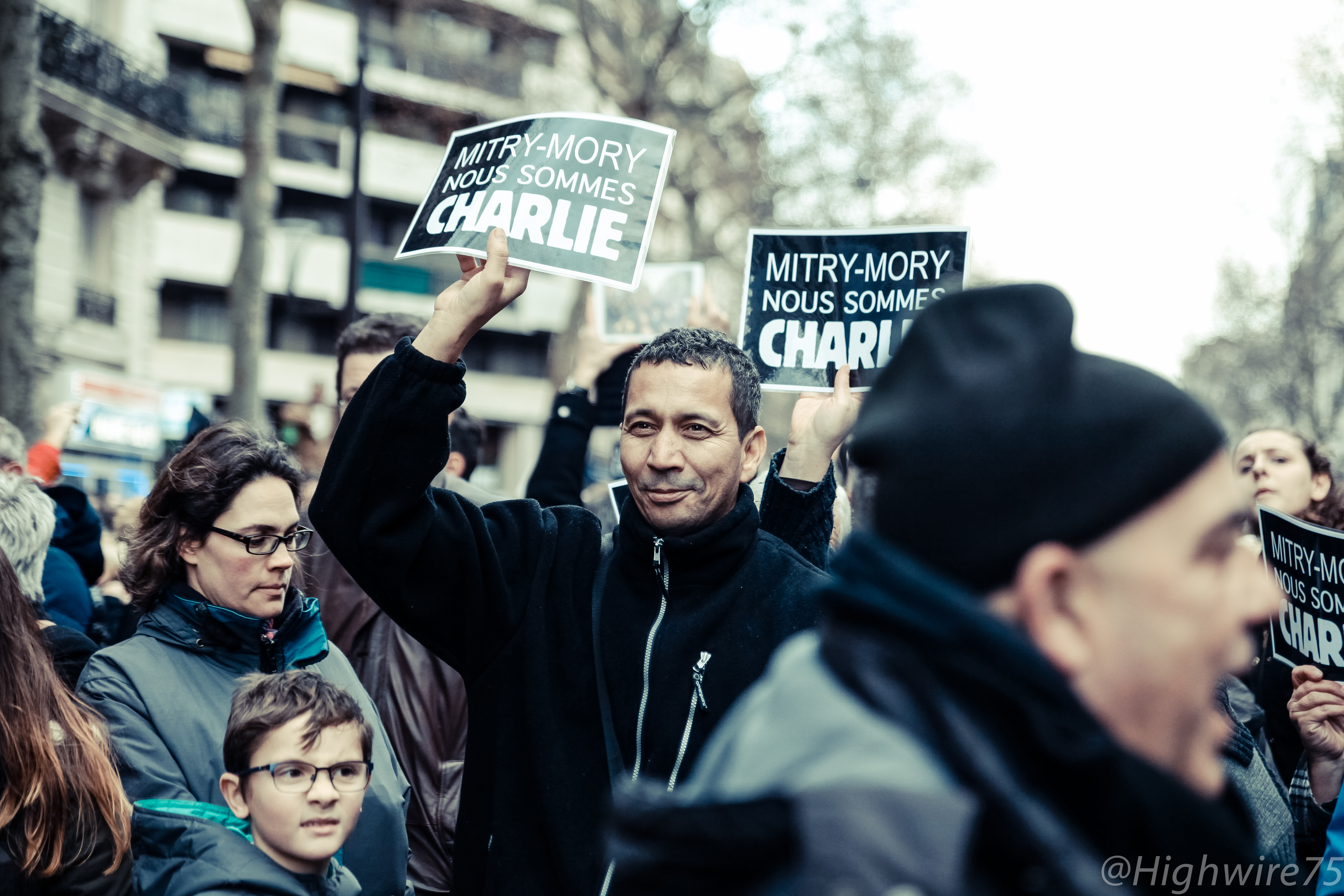
- Rally in support of the victims of the 2015 Charlie Hebdo shooting
- Location: Charlie Hebdo shooting: 10 Rue Nicolas-Appert, 11th arrondissement of Paris, France; Dammartin-en-Goële hostage crisis: Dammartin-en-Goële, France; Fontenay-aux-Roses shooting: Fontenay-aux-Roses, France; Montrouge shooting: Corner of Avenue Pierre Brossolette and Avenue de la Paix in Montrouge, France; Hypercacher kosher supermarket siege: in Porte de Vincennes, Paris, France
- Date: 7 January 2015 11:30 CET –9 January 2015 18:35 CET (UTC+01:00)
- Target: Charlie Hebdo employees, police officers, kosher grocery and citizens in and around Paris
- Attack type: Mass shooting, Islamic terrorism, hostage crisis, Shootout
- Weapons: Zastava M70AB2 assault rifles; Vz. 58 assault rifles; Pump action shotgun; M80 Zolja; Škorpion vz. 61 submachine gun; Two Tokarev pistols
- Deaths: 20 total: 8 employees, 2 police officers, and 2 others at Charlie Hebdo shooting; 1 police officer at Montrouge shooting; 2 gunmen at Dammartin-en-Goële hostage crisis; 4 hostages and 1 gunman at Hypercacher Kosher Supermarket siege
- Injuries: 22 total: 11 people at Charlie Hebdo shooting; 1 civilian at Fontenay-aux-Roses shooting; 1 bystander at Montrouge shooting; 6 hostages and 3 police officers at the Hypercacher kosher supermarket siege
- Perpetrators: Saïd and Chérif Kouachi, Amedy Coulibaly
- No. of participants: 3

From 7 to 9 January 2015, terrorist attacks occurred across the Île-de-France region, particularly in Paris and most prominently at the offices of the magazine Charlie Hebdo. Three assailants killed a total of 17 people in 3 shooting attacks; the attackers were then killed by police. The attacks also wounded 22 others. Al-Qaeda in the Arabian Peninsula (AQAP) claimed responsibility and said that the coordinated attacks had been planned for years. The claim of responsibility for the Charlie Hebdo shooting came in a video showing AQAP commander Nasser bin Ali al-Ansi, with gunmen in the background who were later identified as brothers Chérif and Saïd Kouachi, perpetrators of the Charlie Hebdo shooting. However, while authorities say the video is authentic, there is no proof that AQAP helped to carry out the attacks. Amedy Coulibaly, who carried out the Montrouge shooting and the Hypercacher kosher supermarket siege, claimed that he belonged to ISIS before he was killed.

On 16 December 2020, 14 people, including Coulibaly's accomplice Hayat Boumeddiene, were convicted of involvement in the Île-de-France attacks. Boumeddiene, who was tried in absentia with 2 other defendants, was given a 30-year prison sentence for financing terrorism and belonging to a criminal terrorist network.

== Attack events summary ==
The attacks began on 7 January, when two gunmen attacked the headquarters of the satirical newspaper Charlie Hebdo, killing 12 people and wounding 12 others before escaping. On 9 January, police tracked the assailants to an industrial estate in Dammartin-en-Goële, where they took a hostage. Another gunman shot a police officer on 8 January. He killed four more victims and took hostages on 9 January at a kosher supermarket near the Porte de Vincennes. French armed forces and police conducted simultaneous raids in Dammartin and Porte de Vincennes, killing all three attackers. After 12 January 2015 and for an indefinite period, as part of Operation Sentinelle, nearly 10,500 military personnel were deployed in France to secure 830 sensitive places (school, churches, press organizations, etc ).

At the time, the attacks comprised the deadliest act of terrorism in France since the 1961 Vitry-Le-François train bombing by the Organisation armée secrète (OAS), which was working against Algerian independence. These fatalities were surpassed ten months later by the November 2015 Paris attacks.

== Background ==
In December 2014, three attacks occurred in a span of three days in France.

The first attack occurred in Joué-lès-Tours, in which a knife-wielding man attacked a police station, injuring three officers before being killed. The second attack occurred in Dijon, in which a man used a vehicle to run over eleven pedestrians in several areas of the city before being arrested. The third attack occurred in Nantes, in which a vehicular attack at a Christmas market resulted in ten people being injured and one fatality. The driver was arrested after attempting suicide.

Although the French government concluded that the attacks were not related to each other, it heightened the nation's security and deployed 300 soldiers to patrol the nation's streets.

== Attacks ==
=== Charlie Hebdo shooting ===
The first and deadliest of the attacks occurred at 11:30 CET on 7 January 2015, at the offices of Charlie Hebdo. The Charlie Hebdo magazine began publishing in 1970 with the goal of satirizing religion, politics, and other topics. In 2006, Charlie Hebdo reprinted controversial cartoons of Islamic prophet Muhammed that originally appeared in the Danish newspaper Jyllands-Posten. French President Jacques Chirac criticized their decision to include the cartoons and called it "overt provocation." In 2011, the magazine's offices were destroyed by a gasoline bomb after it published a caricature of Muhammed. Two gunmen, later identified as Chérif and Saïd Kouachi, entered the building and fatally shot eight employees, two police officers, and two others, and injured eleven other people. The perpetrators fled the scene following the shooting. Despite police responding to the situation and arriving on scene as the gunmen were leaving, the two gunmen were able to escape by car. The gunmen's getaway car was found abandoned - after crashing into another vehicle about 2 miles north of where the shootings occurred. Investigators found Molotov cocktails and jihadist flags in the car. The primary motive behind the shooting is said to be the Charlie Hebdo cartoons making fun of numerous Islamic leaders. The shooting received widespread condemnation internationally and a National Day of Mourning was held in France on 8 January.

=== Fontenay-aux-Roses and Montrouge shootings ===
A few hours after the Charlie Hebdo attack on 7 January, a 32-year-old man who was out jogging in Fontenay-aux-Roses was shot and wounded. The man suffered injuries to his arm and back and as of 11 January was in critical condition. Shell casings found at the scene were later linked to the weapon carried by Amedy Coulibaly at the Hypercacher Kosher Supermarket hostage crisis on 9 January. However, the jogger refuted Coulibaly's involvement and recognized Amar Ramdani, a friend of Coulibaly, as the gunman.

On 8 January, Coulibaly shot and killed municipal police officer Clarissa Jean-Philippe at the junction of Avenue Pierre Brossolette and Avenue de la Paix in Montrouge (a suburb of Paris), and critically wounded a street sweeper. As police continued their search for Charlie Hebdo suspects, they initially dismissed the idea that there could be a link between this shooting and the Charlie Hebdo killings, but later confirmed they were in fact connected.

Coulibaly reportedly was heard to declare allegiance to ISIS, a Salafist terrorist organization at war in the Middle East. ISIS, through its media outlet al-Hayat Media Center claimed responsibility for Coulibaly in a jihad nasheed video named "Ma vengeance" celebrating the posterior November 2015 attacks.

=== Dammartin-en-Goële hostage crisis ===
On 9 January, the assailants of the Charlie Hebdo shooting, Chérif and Saïd Kouachi, went to the office of Création Tendance Découverte, a signage production company on an industrial estate in Dammartin-en-Goële. Inside the building were owner Michel Catalano and a male employee, 26-year-old graphics designer Lilian Lepère. During the siege, Catalano told Lepère to hide inside the refectory. Throughout the crisis, the perpetrators were unaware that Lepère was in the building. During the siege, a salesman named Didier went to the building on business, and Catalano left his office, where he had been hiding. Both were confronted by the perpetrators and asked to leave. Didier realized that they were terrorists and quickly alerted the authorities.

Catalano returned to the building and helped one of the perpetrators who had been injured in earlier gunfire. He was allowed to leave after an hour. After this, Lepère, who was hiding in a cardboard box, was able to alert authorities of the situation via text message. The siege ended after nine hours at 16:30 after a combined force of French Armed Forces and police stormed the building and killed both Kouachi brothers, the assailants.

=== Hypercacher Kosher Supermarket siege ===
Also on 9 January, Amedy Coulibaly, armed with several assault weapons, entered a Hypercacher kosher supermarket at Porte de Vincennes in east Paris. Amedy Coulibaly killed four people and took several hostages. Coulibaly was reportedly in contact with the Kouachi brothers as the sieges progressed, and told police that he would kill hostages if the brothers were harmed proving further that these attacks were connected in some form.

When police stormed the grocery store, they gunned down Coulibaly. Fifteen hostages were rescued. Several people were wounded during the incident. Lassana Bathily, a Muslim shop assistant born in Mali, was hailed as a hero in the crisis for risking his life to hide people from the gunman in a downstairs refrigerator room and assisting police after he escaped from the market. Hayat Boumeddiene, Coulibaly's partner in crime and wife, was suspected to have been present during the incident but it was later confirmed that she left France before any of the shootings occurred, traveling to Syria from Turkey. Developments on Boumeddiene's whereabouts ran dry until March 2019, when Dorothee Maquere - wife of Fabien Clain - speculated that Boumeddiene had been killed in Syria late February during the Battle of Baghuz Fawqani.

However, in March 2020, a French jihadist woman told a judge that she met Boumeddiene in October 2019 at the Al Howl camp; Boumeddiene was staying under a false identity and managed to escape. French intelligence services think that this piece of information is plausible and credible as it corroborates previous indications.

After 12 January 2015 and for an indefinite period, as part of Operation Sentinelle, nearly 10,500 military personnel were deployed in France to secure 830 sensitive places (school, churches, press organizations, etc ). The severity of these terrorist attacks forced France to take immediate action to prevent any further related attacks occur.

At the time, the attacks comprised the deadliest act of terrorism in France since the 1961 Vitry-Le-François train bombing by the Organisation armée secrète (OAS), which was working against Algerian independence. These fatalities were surpassed ten months later by the November 2015 Paris attacks.

== Other incidents ==
=== Cyber attacks ===
French media reported that hackers breached the security of French municipality websites during the Île-de-France attacks, changing them to display jihadist propaganda. The French Defense Ministry and security bodies reported that about 19,000 French websites were targeted in an unprecedented wave of denial-of-service attacks following the publication of Charlie Hebdo with a depiction of Muhammad on the cover. The websites of French businesses, religious groups, universities, and municipalities were also hacked and altered to display pro-Islamist messages.

=== Incidents at mosques ===
In the week after the shooting, the organisation "L'Observatoire contre l'islamophobie du Conseil français du culte musulman (CFCM)" called for strengthening of the surveillance of mosques. The French interior department reported that 54 anti-Muslim incidents were recorded in France in the first week after the shootings; this compared to 110 complaints in the first nine months of 2014. The 2015 incidents included 21 reports of shootings and blank grenade throwing at Islamic buildings including mosques; and 33 cases of personal threats and insults. (Note: Incidents like attacks, threats and insults on mosques: nbcnews.com: "mosque in Le Mans ... found an exploded grenade inside the mosque ... a mosque in Port-la-Nouvelle ... reported shots fired at a prayer room from the outside "; huffingtonpost.com: "Two Muslim places of worship and a restaurant affiliated to another mosque were attacked Wednesday evening and Thursday morning local time. Three grenades were thrown at a mosque in Le Mans, west of Paris, and a bullet hole was found in one of the mosque's windows, AFP reported."; reuters.com "In what justice officials said looked like revenge attacks, shots were fired overnight at a mosque in the western city of Le Mans".; aljazeera.com: Mentions earlier attacks on Mosques before the shooting at Charlie Hebdo "Mosques have been burned in France, Sweden and Belgium, among other places."; bloomberg.com: speculations that the terror attack at Charlie Hebdo will give a surge in attacks on Muslims.; usatoday.com: Speculations about higher tensions) After news of the 8 January attack was publicized, three blank grenades were thrown at a mosque in Le Mans, west of Paris. A new bullet hole was found in its windows. In addition, a Muslim prayer hall in the Port-la-Nouvelle was the target of shooting, but no one was injured. An explosion took place at a restaurant affiliated with a mosque in Villefranche-sur-Saone. No casualties were reported.

== 2020 trial ==
On 16 December 2020, a French court convicted 14 accomplices after the three attackers for crimes ranging from financing terrorism to membership of a criminal gang in relation to the attacks. However, three were convicted in absentia, including Hayat Boumeddiene, the former partner of Coulibaly. Boumeddiene would be convicted of financing terrorism and belonging to a criminal terrorist network, and received a sentence of 30 years in jail.

== See also ==
- 2014 Tours police station stabbing
- 2015 TV5Monde cyber-attack
- List of Islamist terrorist attacks
- List of terrorist incidents in France
- November 2015 Paris attacks
- Terrorism in the European Union
