= Hypercacher kosher supermarket siege =

2015 Islamist terrorist attack in Paris

Hypercacher supermarket siege
- Part of the January 2015 Île-de-France attacks
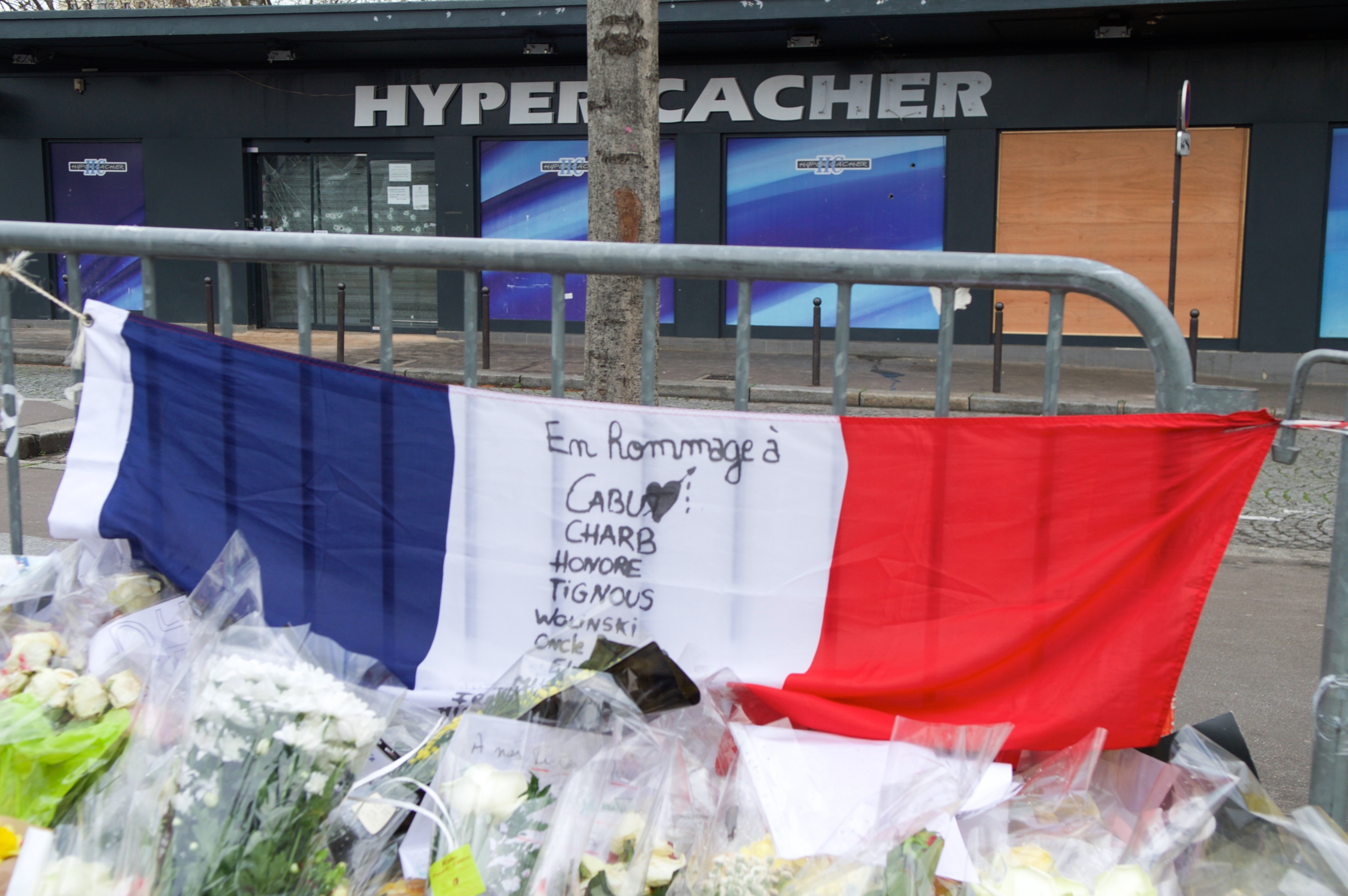
- Flowers and a French flag outside the Hypercacher kosher supermarket
- Location: 48.8471°N 2.4155°E; Hypercacher kosher supermarket in Porte de Vincennes, Paris, France
- Date: 9 January 2015; 11 years ago 13:00 CET – 17:30 CET (UTC+01:00)
- Target: Jewish supermarket patrons
- Attack type: Hostage taking, terrorism, mass murder, shooting
- Weapons: Two Tokarev pistols; One VZ.58 carbine
- Deaths: 6 (four hostages, a police woman the day before and the perpetrator)
- Injuries: 9 (six hostages, two police officers, one RAID member, one BRI member)
- Perpetrator: Amedy Coulibaly
- Defender: Lassana Bathily
- Motive: Antisemitism, Islamic extremism

On 9 January 2015, Amedy Coulibaly, armed with a submachine gun, an assault rifle, and two Tokarev pistols, entered and attacked a Hypercacher kosher supermarket in Porte de Vincennes in Paris, France. There, Coulibaly murdered four Jewish hostages and held fifteen other hostages during a siege in which he demanded that the perpetrators of the Charlie Hebdo shooting, the Kouachi brothers, not be harmed. The siege ended when police stormed the supermarket, killing Coulibaly. The Charlie Hebdo shooting had taken place just days earlier, as did the Dammartin-en-Goële hostage crisis, in which the two Charlie Hebdo gunmen were cornered.

On 16 December 2020, 14 accomplices to both the Jewish supermarket attack and the Charlie Hebdo shooting, including Coulibaly's former partner Hayat Boumeddiene, were convicted. At that time, three of the accomplices, including Boumeddiene, had not been captured and were tried in absentia.

== Hostage-taking ==
On 9 January 2015, Amedy Coulibaly, who had pledged allegiance to the Islamic State, attacked the people in a Hypercacher kosher food supermarket at Porte de Vincennes in east Paris. He killed four people, all of whom were Jewish, and took several hostages. Some media outlets claimed he had a female accomplice, speculated initially to be his common-law wife, Hayat Boumeddiene.

Coulibaly was later confirmed to be the gunman in a shooting in Montrouge the previous day. In that shooting he killed a municipal police officer, Clarissa Jean-Philippe.

A witness stated, "People were buying things when a man came in with a rifle and started shooting in all directions. I ran out. The shooting continued for several seconds." Coulibaly recorded seven minutes of his attack using a GoPro camera attached to his torso, and emailed a copy of the footage using a computer at the supermarket. The video included the deaths of three of the victims.

In an interview with BFMTV during an ensuing standoff, Coulibaly stated that he targeted the Jews at the Kosher grocery to defend Muslims, notably Palestinians. Due to a mobile phone line that was unintentionally left open, Coulibaly's dialogue with his hostages was recorded and transcribed by RTL (French radio). Coulibaly said his action was revenge for the Syrian government action and against the Western coalition actions in Mali, Iraq, and Afghanistan.

Yohan Cohen, aged 22, and Yoav Hattab, aged 21, were hailed as heroes by their fellow hostages, as they were murdered by Coulibaly while seeking to overcome him and free the other hostages in the store. Coulibaly reportedly abandoned one of his weapons on a counter-top in the store as he entered, after it had jammed. After Coulibaly proceeded to threaten a customer with a small child at the beginning of the attack, Cohen, an employee, attempted to grab the abandoned weapon with the help of Hattab, and take down Coulibaly. When the malfunctioning gun jammed on Cohen at that moment, Coulibaly shot Cohen in the head, and then proceeded to shoot Hattab. The remaining victims of the attack, François-Michel Saada and Philippe Braham, reportedly immediately sought to resist Coulibaly as well.

Lassana Bathily, a Malian-born Muslim shop assistant, was also hailed as a hero in the hostage crisis for hiding people from the gunman and assisting police after his escape. During the hostage crisis, Bathily helped hide hostages in a cold storage container in the basement. Bathily then tried to call the police, but the line was busy, so he called his friend, a Frenchman named Dennis Mercier, and Mercier alerted the authorities about the hostage situation by flagging down a policeman. When Coulibaly opened fire in the store, killing Cohen, Hattab, Saada, and Braham and taking hostages, Bathily led fifteen people into the downstairs cold storage room for safety. Bathily was then able to escape alone by slipping out of the store using elevator equipment. Upon leaving the store, he was immediately handcuffed and arrested by police who suspected him of playing a role in the attack. He was released after an hour and a half. Bathily also provided the officers with a key to open the store's metal blinds.

Coulibaly was reportedly in contact with the Kouachi brothers as the sieges of both him and the brothers progressed simultaneously, and told police that he would kill hostages if the brothers were harmed. Nearby schools were placed under lock-down, and local Jewish businesses were shut down as a precaution.

In 2015, several hostages sued French media over its coverage; in particular the French 24-hour news channel BFMTV. The lawyer representing the group, Patrick Klugman, said that hostages' lives were endangered by the coverage which revealed a cold room as one of their hiding places.

== Police intervention ==
All remained relatively quiet until suddenly four very loud stun grenades went off in four places at around 17:09 local time. Heavily armed police marched towards the scene whilst backup came to the scene. They surrounded the shop, with Coulibaly firing shots in the air. Someone had opened the shutters and automatic sliding doors to the supermarket. This led to police storming the grocery store, shooting and killing Coulibaly, who had previously fired shots back at police and then charged at the entrance to attack police. As he jumped, police opened fire and killed him. At least four explosions were heard, all of which were stun grenades thrown by police. Hostages were seen running out, one with a child in his arms, as ambulances swarmed the area.

Fifteen hostages were rescued. Several people, including two police officers, were wounded during the incident. French President François Hollande and a prosecutor later confirmed that four people had been killed by Coulibaly as he took the hostages before the siege began. Explosives tied to a detonator were later found around the store. Bathily provided information about the store to assist police.

The Hypercacher supermarket, the day after the hostage crisis

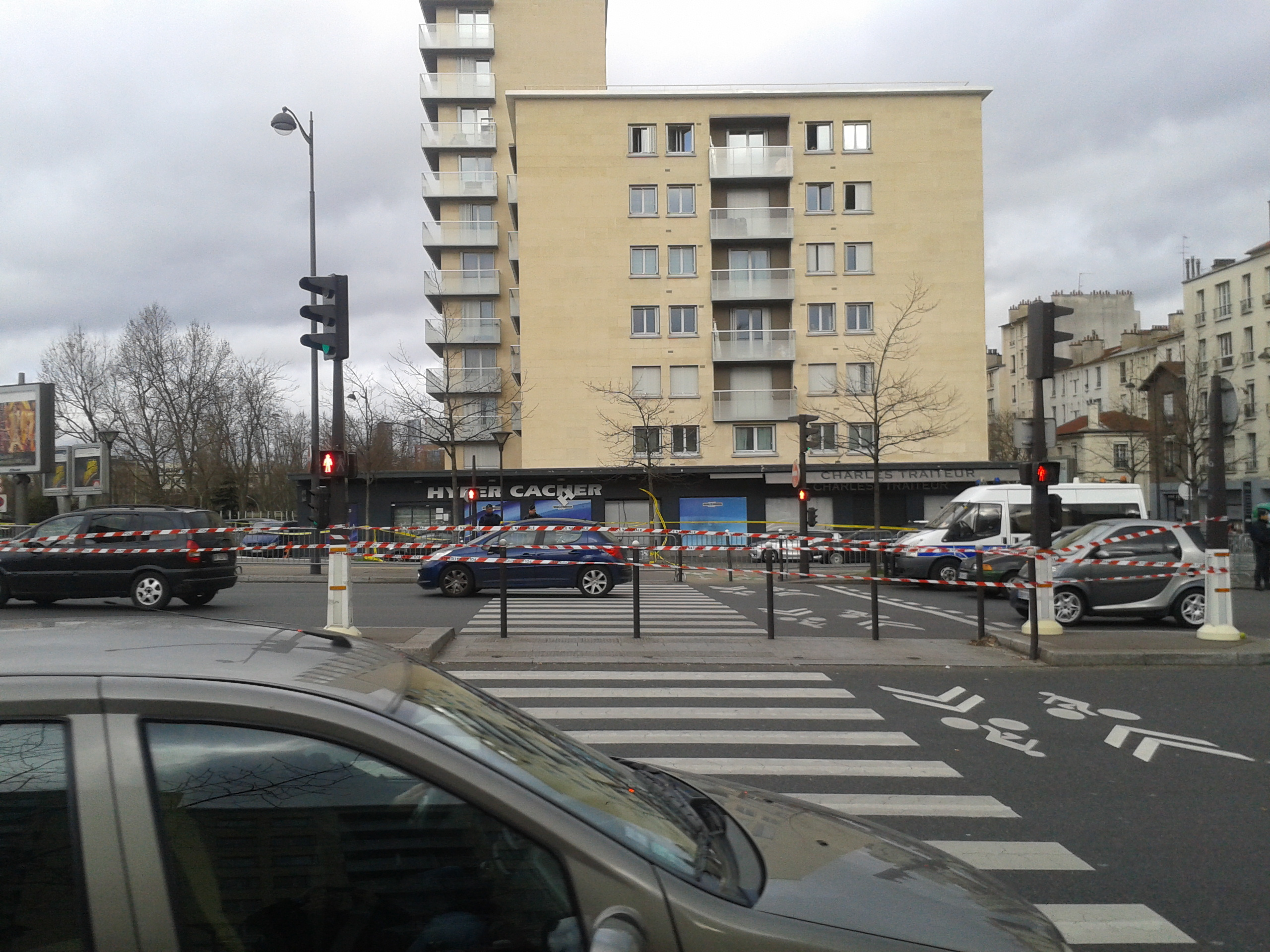

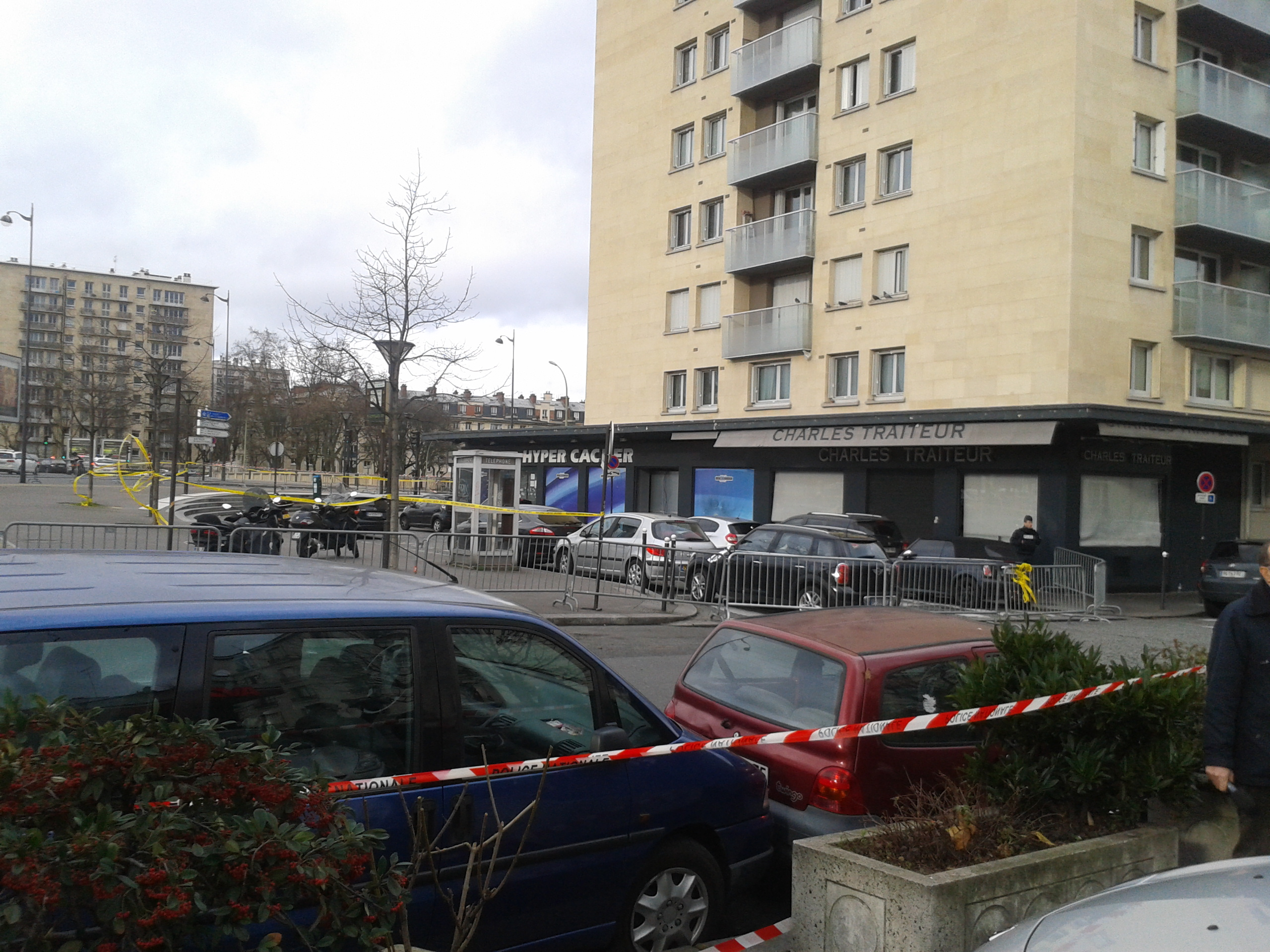

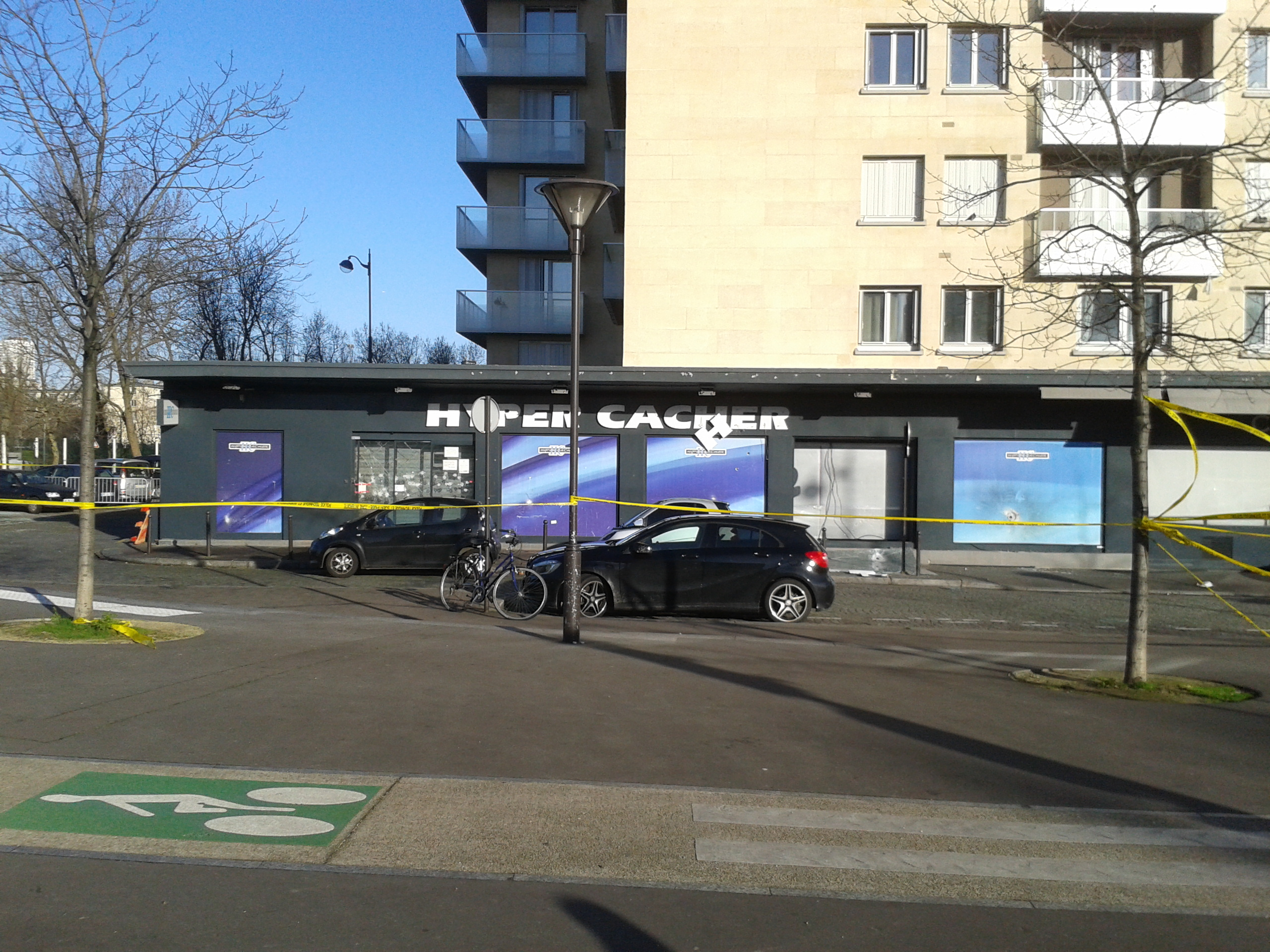
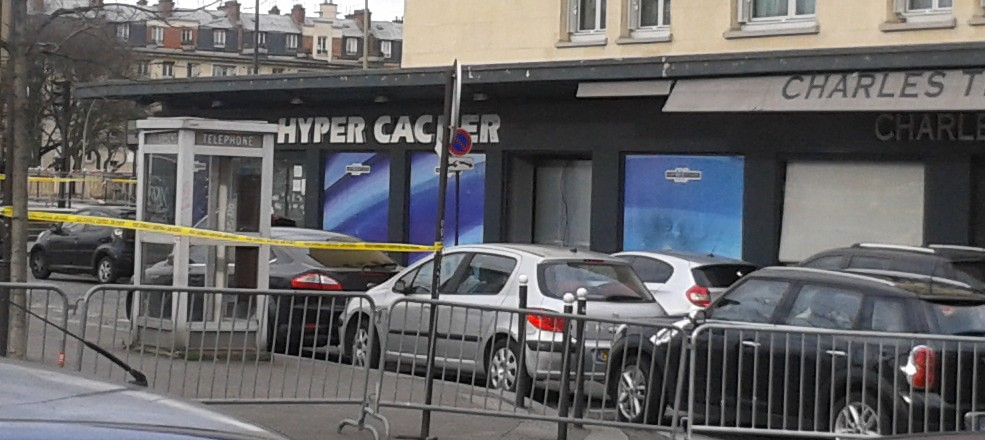

== Victims ==
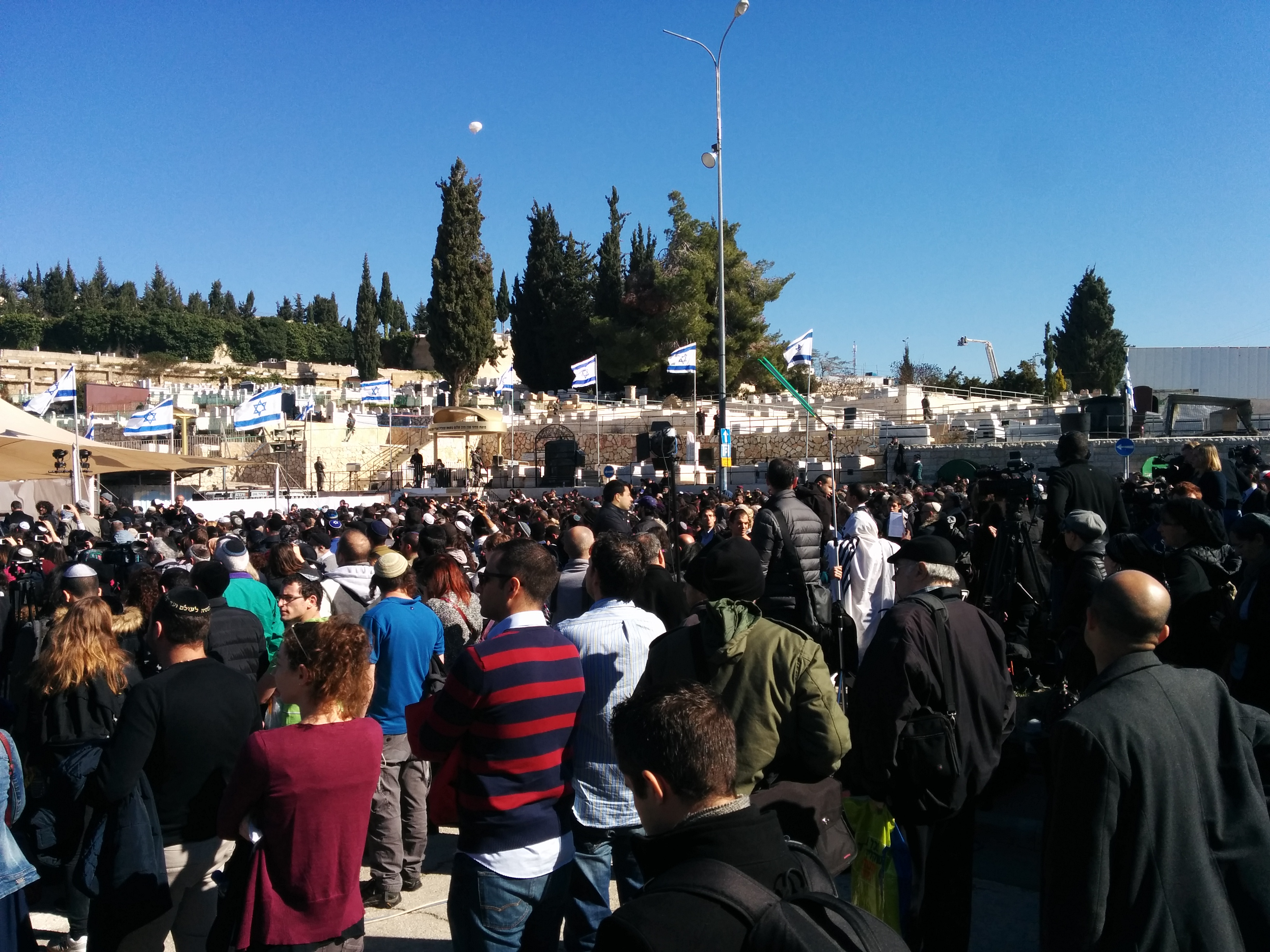
Funeral in Jerusalem for the four Jewish murder victims

- Philippe Braham, 45, IT sales executive
- Yohan Cohen, 22, an economics student and worker at Hypercacher
- Yoav Hattab, 21, a Tunisian college student
- François-Michel Saada, 64, retiree.
- Municipal police officer Clarissa Jean-Philippe, 27, killed on the previous day by the same gunman

The victims were posthumously awarded the Legion of Honour by the French Republic. At the instigation of the Israeli government, and after some pressure on the families, it was decided that they should be buried at the Givat Shaul cemetery in Jerusalem on 13 January 2015. The funeral was attended by thousands, some holding signs reading "Je suis juif" or "Je suis Israelien," with pictures of the four dead. During the ceremony, Israeli Prime Minister Benjamin Netanyahu, Israeli President Reuven Rivlin, and French Ecology Minister Ségolène Royal gave brief speeches. Royal said, "Anti-Semitism has no place in France. I want to assure you of the unfailing determination of the French government to fight against all forms and acts of anti-Semitism."

== Reactions ==
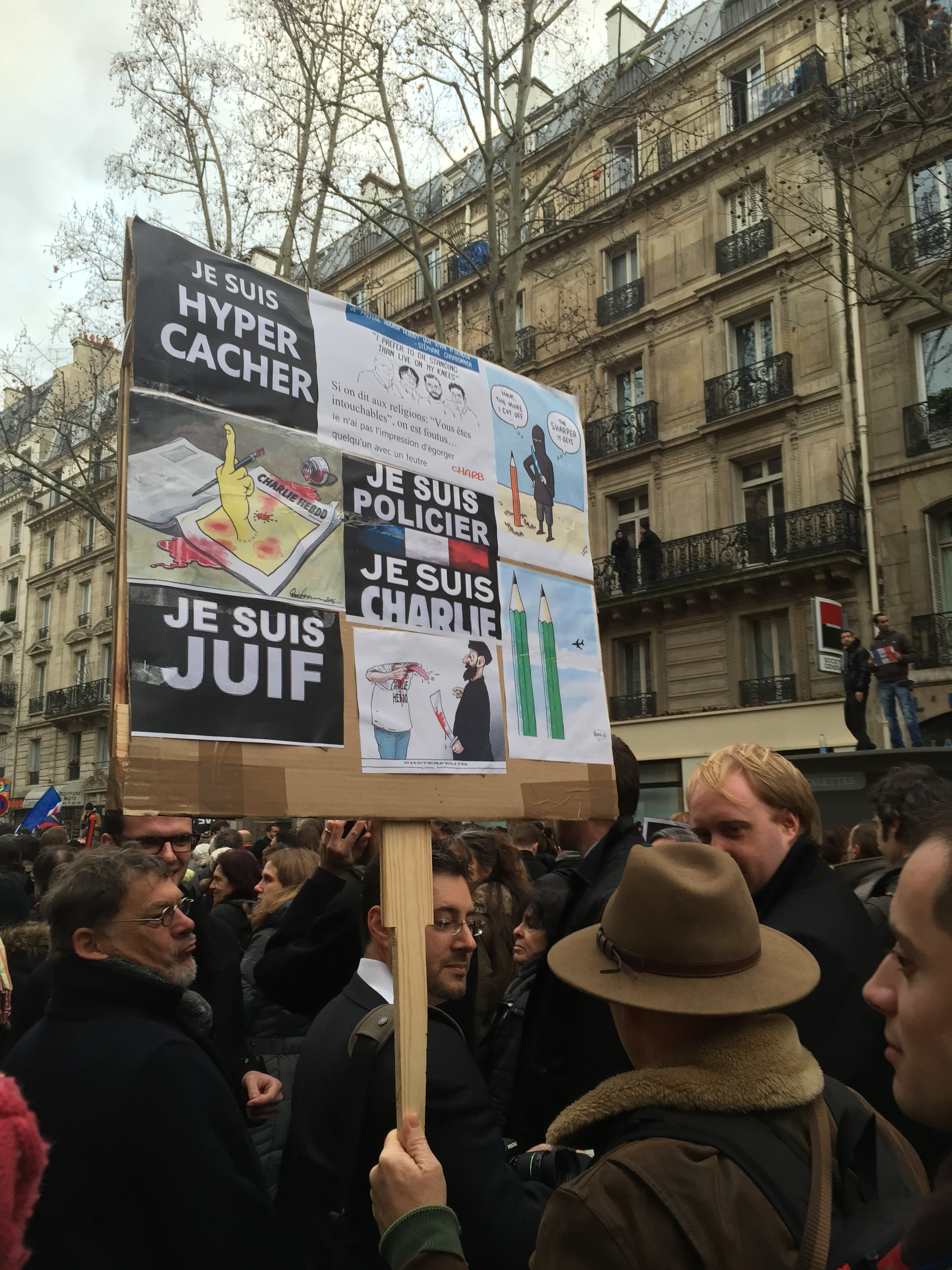
Marches in memory of the siege on 11 January 2015

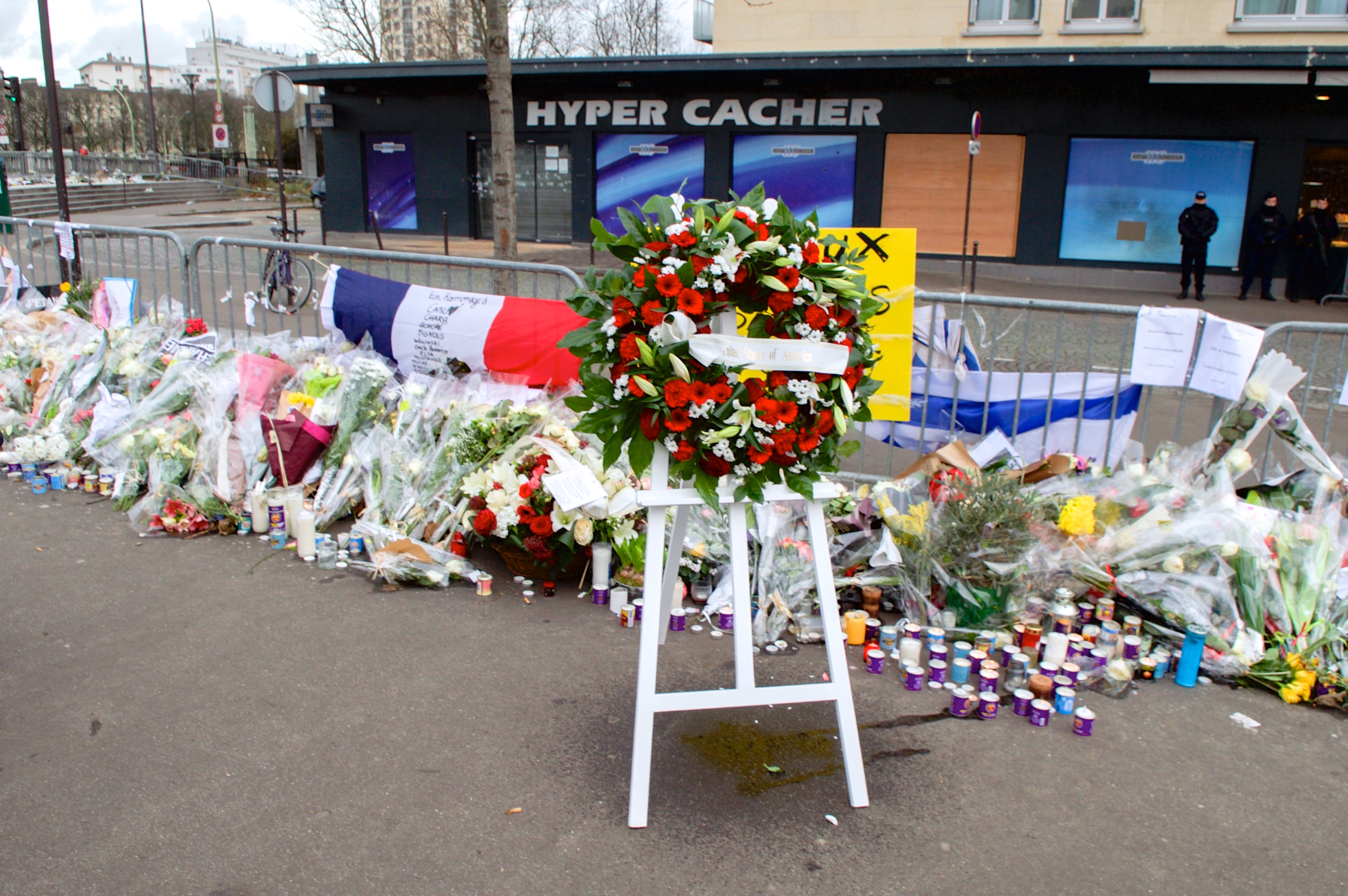
Wreaths laid by public figures such as John Kerry outside the supermarket.

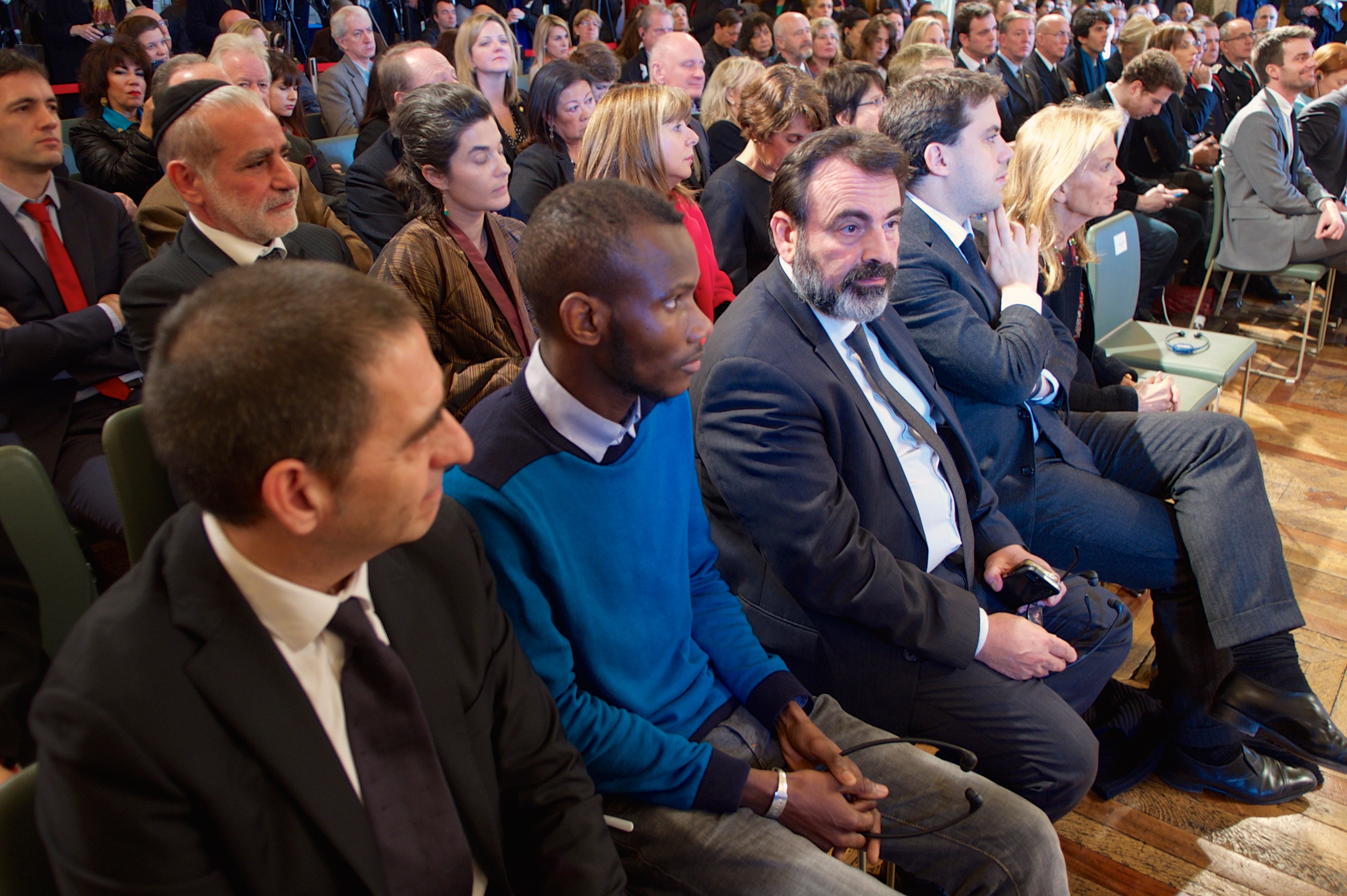
Lassana Bathily being honored by John Kerry.

President François Hollande described the event as a "terrifying act of anti-Semitism." Israel's Foreign Affairs Minister Avigdor Lieberman issued a statement, saying the attacks "[were] not just against the French people or French Jews, they're against the entire free world. This is another attempt by the dark forces of radical Islam to unleash horror and terror on the West. The entire international community must stand strong and determined in the face of this terror."

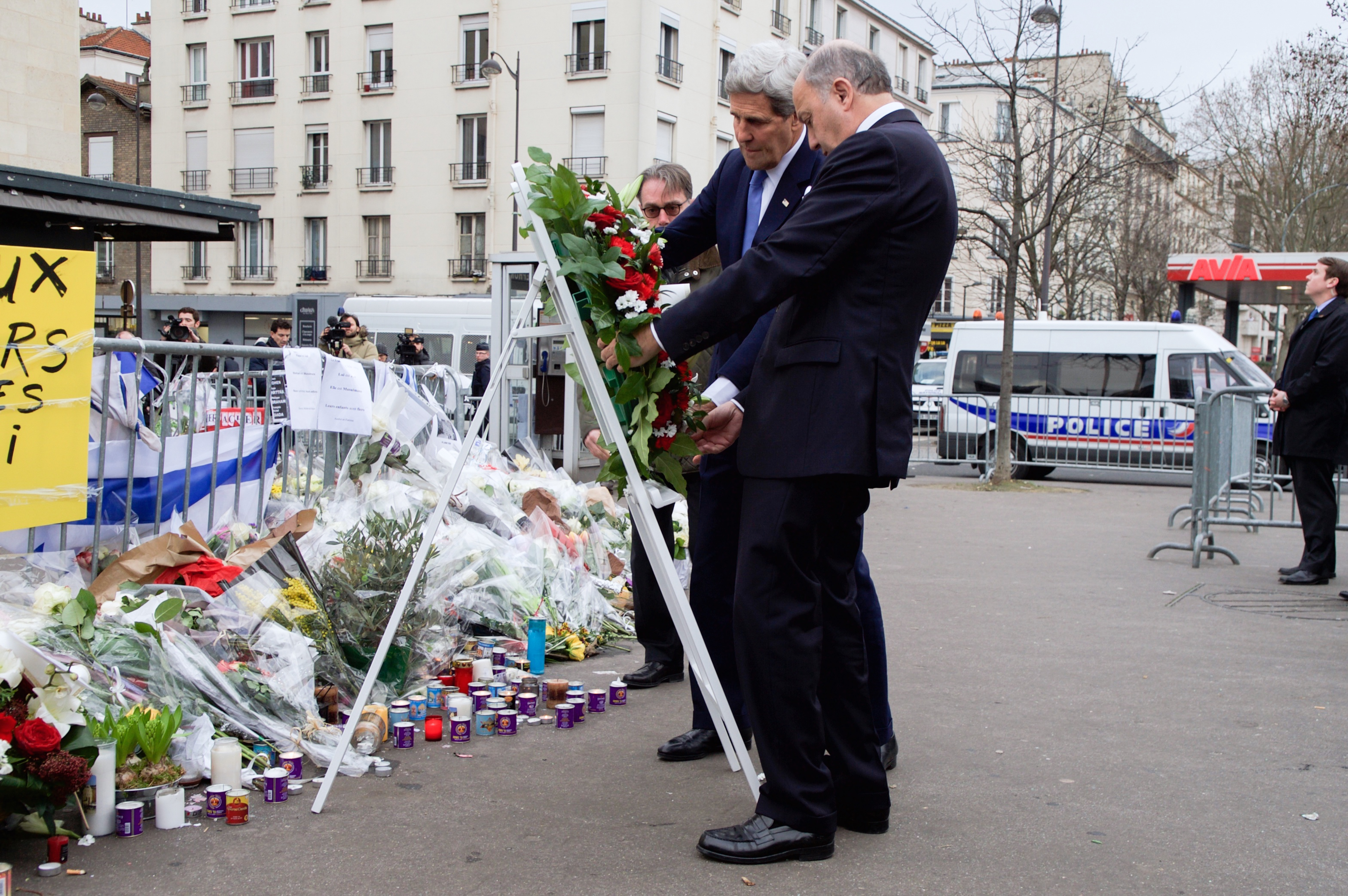
US Secretary of State John Kerry and French Foreign Minister Laurent Fabius laying wreaths outside the scene

Hamas officially condemned the attack on Charlie Hebdo but was silent on the attack at the Hypercacher.

The Facebook page of "Al-Rasalah publication" praised the attackers. According to Arutz Sheva, the publication is linked to Hamas.

Lassana Bathily, a Muslim store worker who moved from Mali to France in 2006, was hailed as a "hero," a title he himself rejected. Israeli Prime Minister Benjamin Netanyahu expressed his appreciation for Bathily's actions. Bathily was awarded French nationality for his life-saving actions. On 20 January 2015, at a special ceremony in Paris, he was given his passport by the French prime minister, Manuel Valls, in person; the interior minister, Bernard Cazeneuve, was also present. A petition was also started to grant him the Legion of Honour. On 24 March 2015, at a ceremony in Los Angeles, he was presented with the Medal of Valor of the Simon Wiesenthal Center.

The manager of the kosher supermarket, 39-year-old Patrice Oalid, who was shot in the arm during the attack, announced he would move to Israel.

French comedian and political activist Dieudonné likened himself to Amedy Coulibaly on Facebook, commenting that "I feel like Charlie Coulibaly." As a result, he was detained and questioned by the French police. Moreover, Paris prosecutor started a legal investigation due to his alleged "defense of terrorism." The French Prime Minister, Manuel Valls, stated, "Racism, antisemitism and the defense of terrorism are crimes," adding, "One should not confuse freedom of opinion and antisemitism." Moreover, Bernard Cazeneuve, the Interior Minister, called Dieudonné's remark "contemptible." The Conseil représentatif des institutions juives de France (CRIF) also denounced Dieudonné's comment, and called for French theatres to block him from performing.

United States President Barack Obama stated deep concern about "a bunch of violent, vicious zealots who behead people or randomly shoot a bunch of folks in a deli in Paris." Some commentators criticized Obama's description of the attack as "random," arguing it downplayed the role of anti-semitism. One reporter asked government spokeswoman Jen Psaki, "If a guy goes into a kosher market and starts shooting it up, you don't – he's not looking for Buddhists, is he?"

=== Aftermath ===
French Interior Minister Bernard Cazeneuve attended the reopening of the market on 15 March.

== 2020 trial ==
On 16 December 2020, a French court convicted 14 accomplices after the three attackers for crimes ranging from financing terrorism to membership of a criminal gang in relation to the attacks. However, three were convicted in absentia, including Hayat Boumeddiene, the former partner of Coulibaly. Boumeddiene would be convicted of financing terrorism and belonging to a criminal terrorist network, and received a sentence of 30 years in prison.

== See also ==
- 2019 Jersey City shooting
- Antisemitism in 21st-century France
- Jewish Museum of Belgium shooting
- List of hostage crises
- Strasbourg Cathedral bombing plot
- Toulouse and Montauban shootings
