= Municipal Police (France) =

French local police of towns and cities

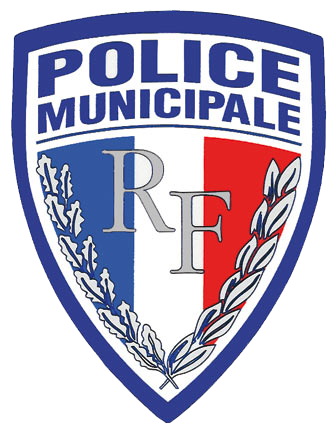
The Municipal Police logo

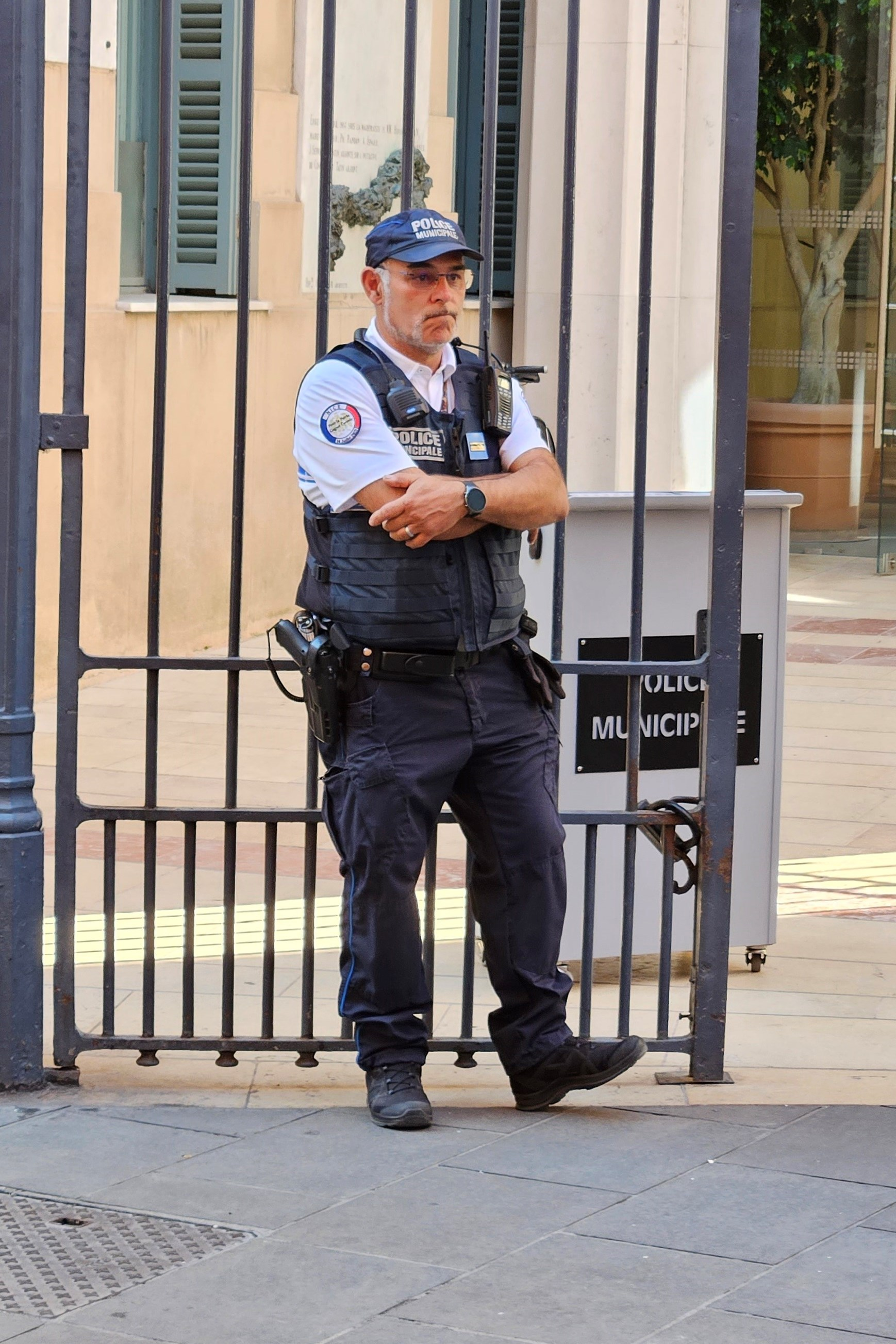
Municipal police officer in Nice, Provence-Alpes-Côte d'Azur

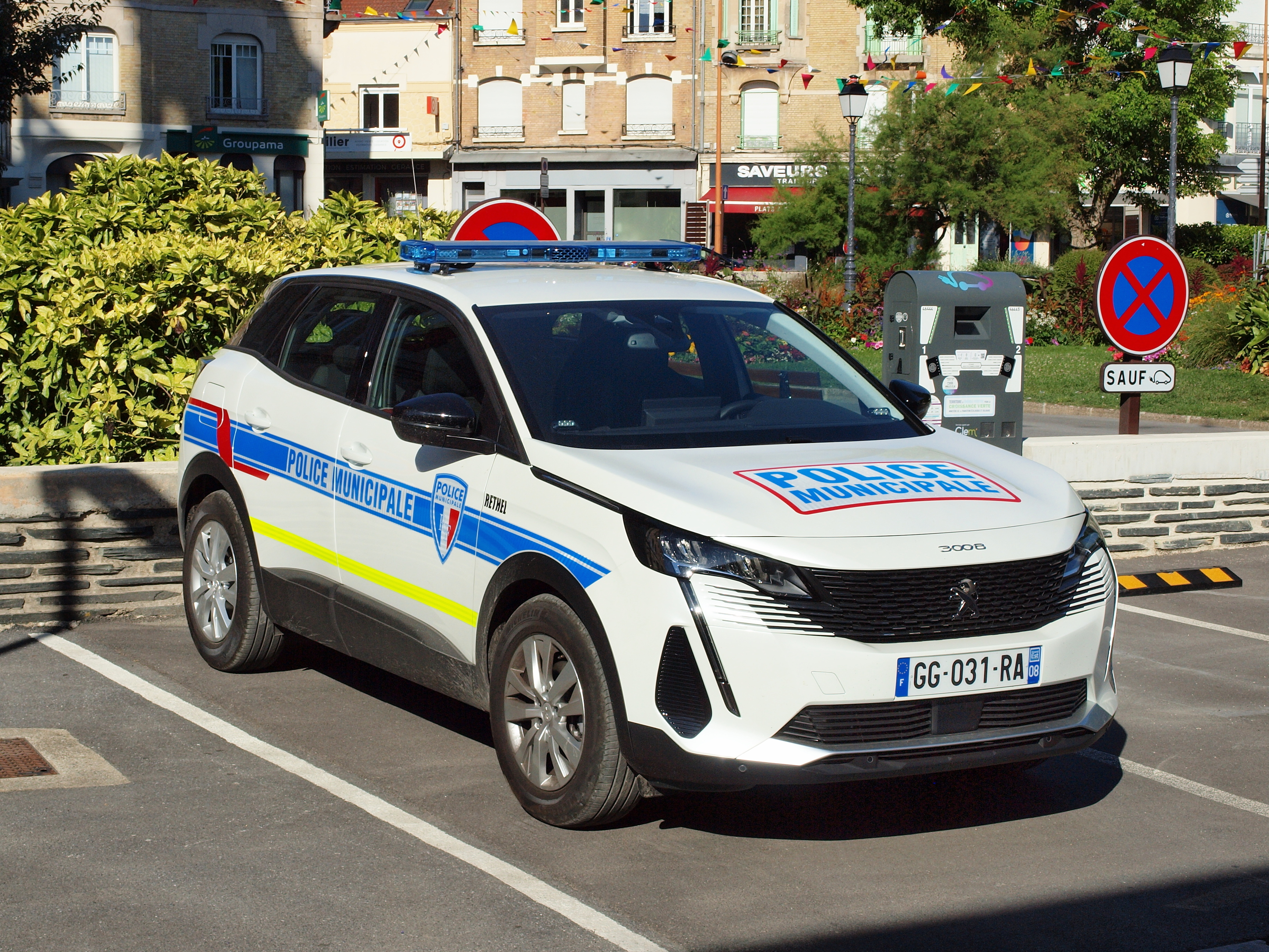
Municipal Police Peugeot 3008 in Rethel, Grand Est

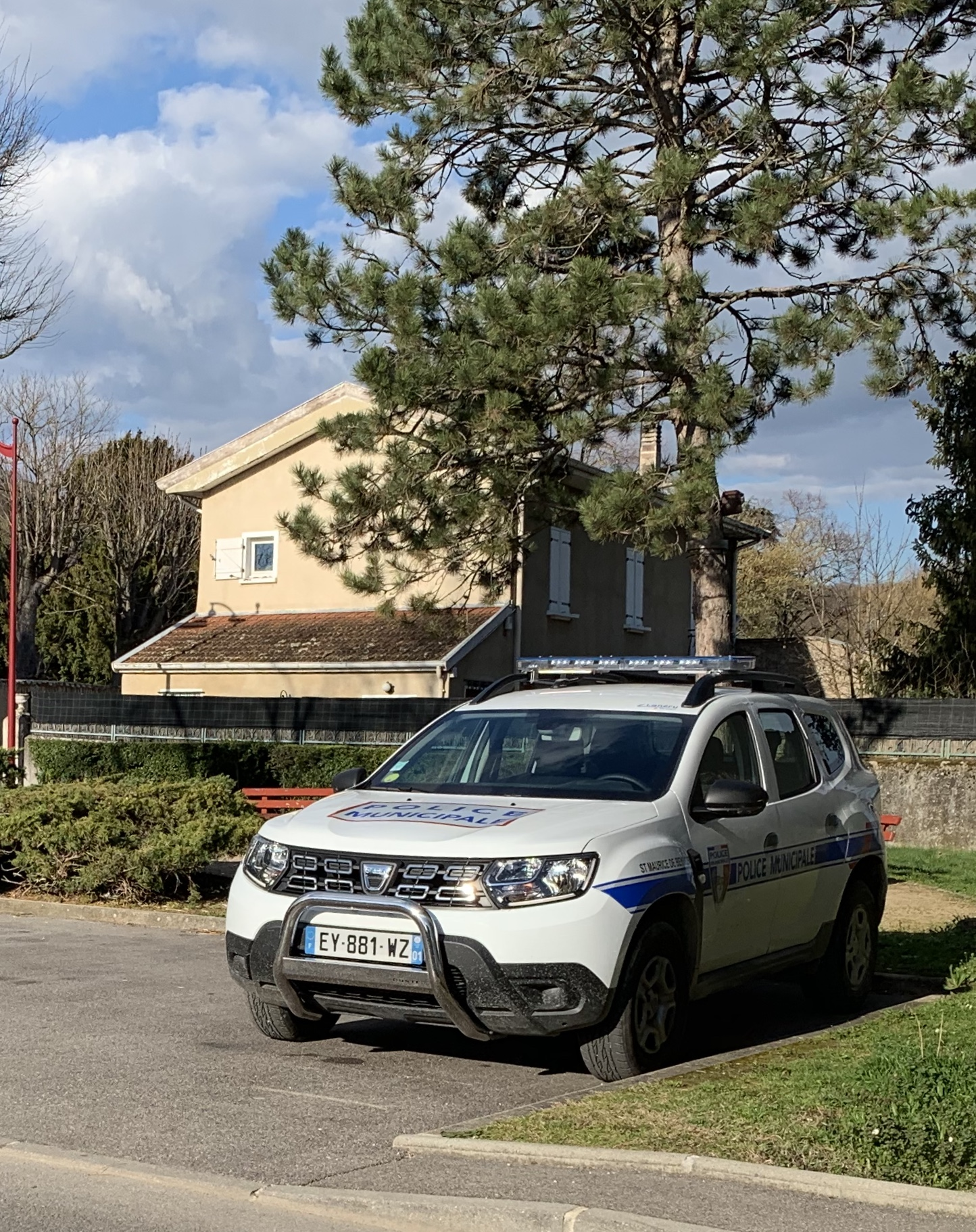
Municipal Police Dacia Duster in Saint-Maurice-de-Beynost, Auvergne-Rhône-Alpes

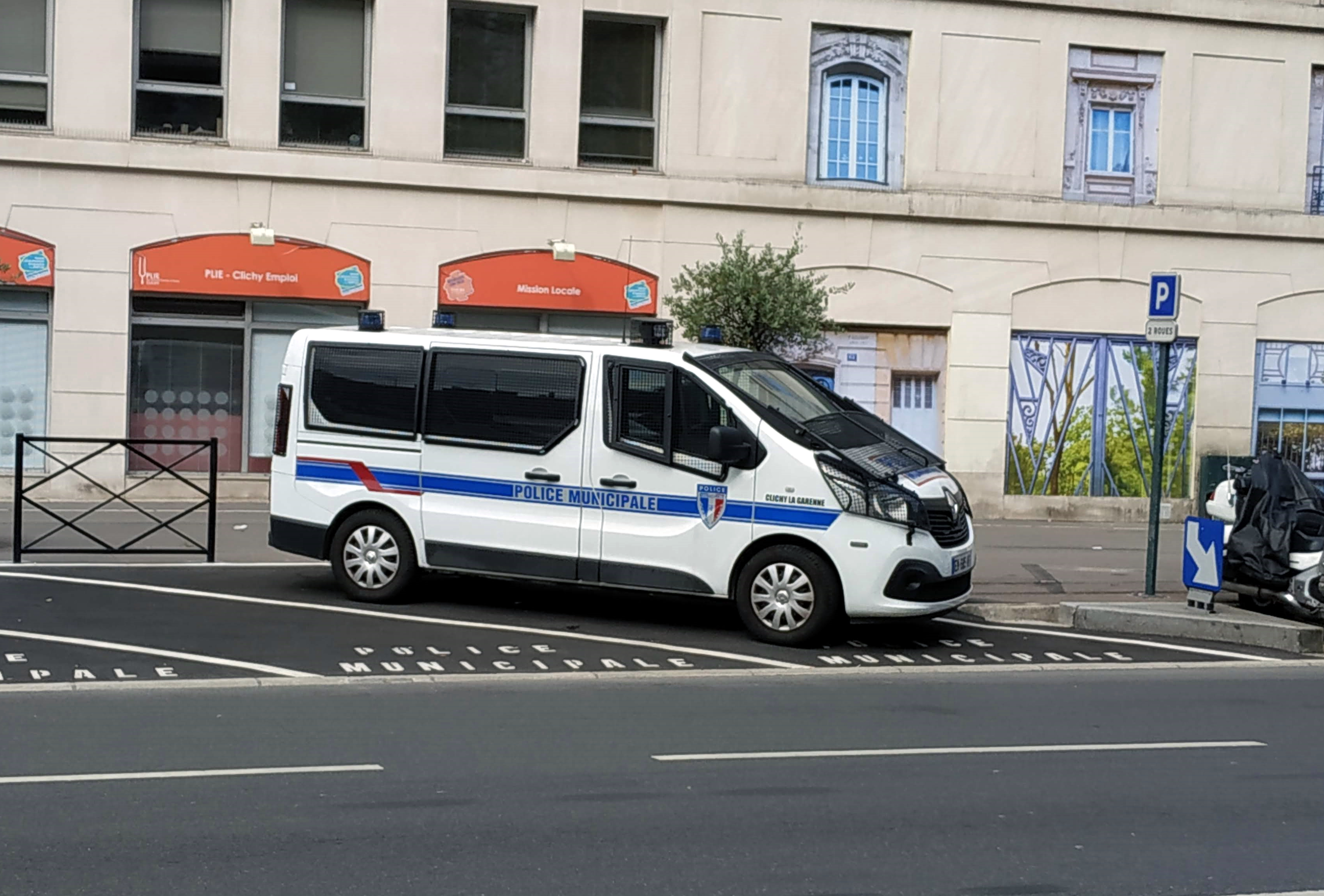
Police municipale Renault Trafic van in Clichy, Île-de-France

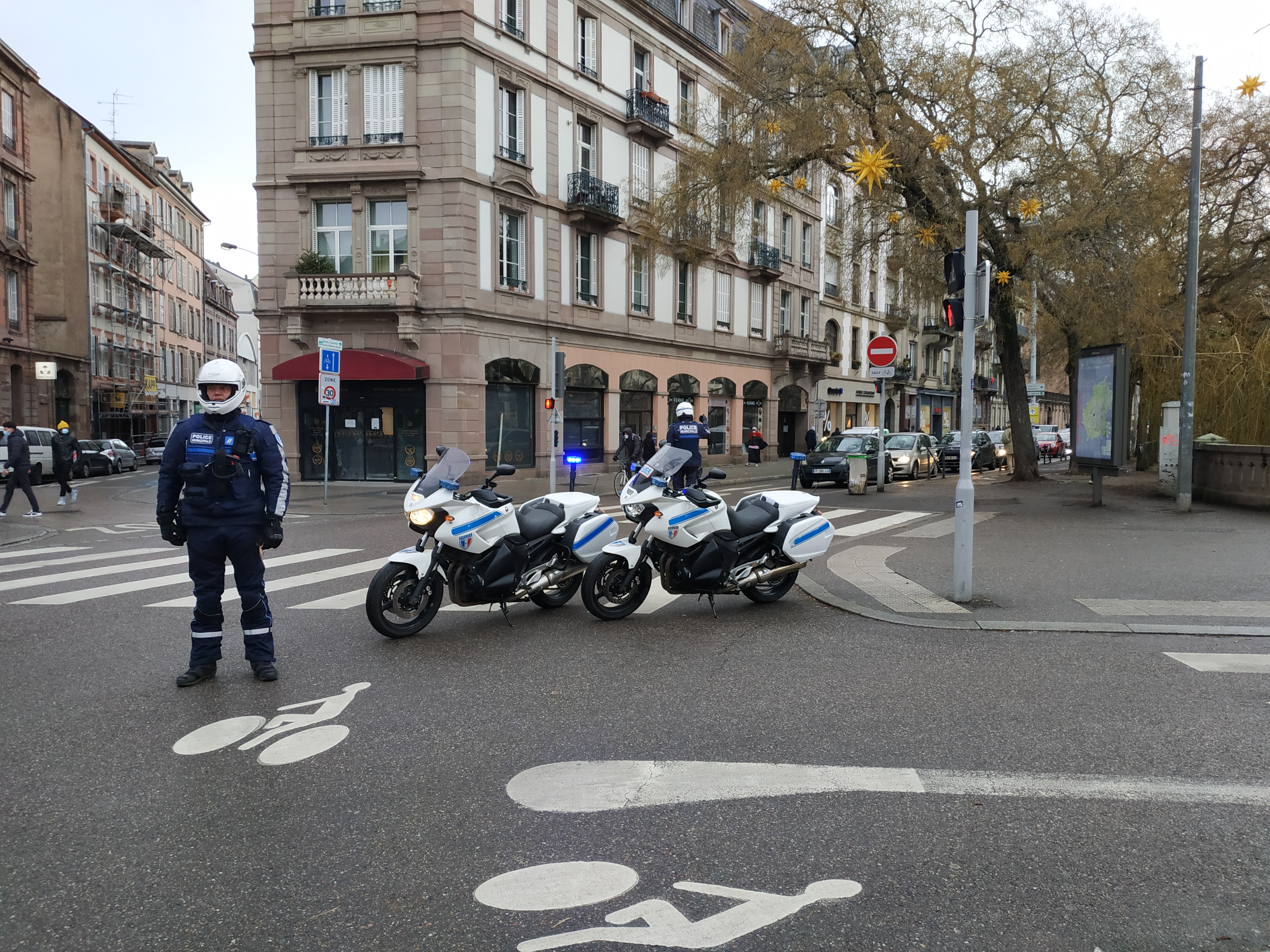
Traffic control in Strasbourg, Grand Est

GOST municipal riot police during the 2026 French student protests in Perpignan, Pyrénées-Orientales

The Municipal Police (French: police municipale) are the local police of towns and cities in France. There are 24,000 municipal police officers in 4,555 communities. The municipal police are one of the three components of French policing, alongside the National Police and the National Gendarmerie, with about 145,000 police and 98,000 soldiers respectively.

Policing in Paris is the responsibility of the Paris Police Prefecture, part of the National Police. However, Paris now has a municipal police which is replacing the Direction de la prévention, de la sécurité et de la protection (DPSP) (Prevention, Security and Protection Directorate) which is composed of agents with some municipal police powers titled inspecteurs de sécurité (Security Inspectors). The police powers of the Paris mayor however remain more limited than the powers of regular French mayor.

== Law enforcement roles ==
Under Article 21 2 of the Code of Criminal Procedure, the duties of the municipal police include:

- security, safety and public order
- the correct application of the bylaws.
- monitoring and regulation of road traffic and the recording of traffic violations.
- routine screening for alcohol offences.
- maintenance of law 78-6 of the Code of Criminal Procedure.
- assistance to citizens of the town.
- the laws of urban planning.
- reporting of crimes over which they have no jurisdiction.

The municipal police may carry out arrests as part of the act and are required to deliver any perpetrator to an officer of the national police or the national gendarmerie.

== Numbers ==
There are approximately 28,500 municipal police officers in 2023 providing about 13% of the total French law enforcement community.

The municipal police may also incorporate the duties of the forest rangers and game wardens (gardes champêtres) in rural areas.

Year	Number of municipal police officers	Number of municipalities with municipal police
1984	5,641	1,748
1987	8,159	2,345
1989	9,361	2,663
1993	10,977	2,849
1999	13,098	3,030
2004	16 673	
2010	18,000	3,500
2015	20,000	
2019	24,000	4,555

== Legal authority and legislation ==
The French municipal police are under the direct authority of the mayor, who is charged with significant powers of police administration, according to the regulations in Article L. 2212-2 du Code général des collectivités territoriales (CGCT) (2212-2 of the General Code of Territorial (CGCT)) with a responsibility to ensure good order, safety, security, and public health, and also to provide an administrative function, known as the "police power of the mayor. "

Although the word "police" refers to the maintenance of order, the function mainly comprises the protection of citizens from disasters, and the task of regulating traffic and parking. To do so, municipalities are required to establish municipal police services, under the authority of the mayor for the task of enforcing local bylaws.

To implement the mayor's responsibility, municipalities can create appropriate services and hire two types of agents: the municipal police, the functions and status are discussed in this article, and Garde champêtre whose employment is often created in rural areas.

The general code regulating local authorities lays down the status of municipal police officers:

"Without prejudice to the general jurisdiction of the national police force and national gendarmerie, within the limits of their powers, the municipal police officers carry out duties required by the town council for crime prevention, public order, security, and public safety.

Without prejudice to the powers accorded them by special laws, they issue traffic fines and penalties for offences listed in Book VI of the penal code established by the Council of State and under the conditions laid down in paragraph 2 of section 21 of the Criminal Procedure Code and penal laws.

They are also vested with powers to oversee infringements of Article L. 126-3 of the Code of Construction and Housing.

During the course of their duties they act under the authority of the mayor of the municipality. "

== Activities ==
Interventions of the municipal police are also carried out in coordination with other police forces; a mandatory agreement defines and limits the nature and location of their interventions and the manner in which they collaborate with other police forces. With the exception of the static guarding of buildings and surveillance of ceremonies, festivals and other events, without this agreement, the tasks of local police can only be exercised between 6 am and 23 pm. Overall supervision and regulation of the municipal police is under the jurisdiction the Ministry of the Interior, which is empowered to carry out inspections by agencies such as the IGPN. Articles L 2212-5 (paragraph 4) and the L CGCT 2212–9, provide for inter-municipal police collaboration between municipalities or groups of municipalities.

The police officers recruited through the municipal council are considered primarily available to every mayor in his hometown for local policing. They may also be required to be sworn in by the district judge to provide services to the national police of neighbouring districts or to the gendarmerie in rural areas.

The municipal police do not generally carry firearms. At the request of the mayor, the prefect of the department in which the commune or municipality is located may authorise municipal police officers to be armed in certain circumstances or for special night work. In some cities, all municipal police officers are permanently armed.

== Weapons ==
Whereas some French Municipal officers are equipped with firearms, many are equipped only with pepper spray, batons, and handcuffs, each municipal police agency may have different weapons, meaning that some municipal police may carry revolvers while others have more modern semi-automatic pistols.

Since 2000, revolvers are chambered in .38 special, and semi-automatic pistols in .32 ACP. From 2016, semi-automatic pistols in 9mm are allowed.

Some of the sidearms utilized by the various municipal police are listed but not limited to:

Weapon	Origin	Type
Smith & Wesson Model 65	United States	Revolver
Manurhin MR 88	France	Revolver
Taurus 82	Brazil	Revolver
SIG Sauer SP 2022	Switzerland	Semi-automatic pistol
SIG Sauer P320	United States	Semi-automatic pistol
PAMAS G1	France	Semi-automatic pistol
Glock	Austria	Semi-automatic pistol
Beretta APX	Italy	Semi-automatic pistol
CZ P-07	Czech Republic	Semi-automatic pistol

== Ranks and rank insignia ==
- Municipal police officers, class C:
  - Gardien-brigadier stagiaire
  - Gardien-brigadier
  - Brigadier (name of Gardien-brigadier after 4 years of service)
  - Brigadier-chef principal
- Municipal police officers, class B:
  - Chef de service
  - Chef de service principal de 2e classe
  - Chef de service principal de 1e classe
- Municipal police officers, class A:
  - Directeur de police municipale or Directeur principal de police municipale

== See also ==
- National Gendarmerie
- National Police (France)

== Sources ==
2. ↑ Note: Section 21 of the Criminal Procedure Code confers municipal police officers with the status of deputy judicial police officers. As such, it empowers them to assist national police officers in the exercise of their duties, to report to their superiors any crimes, or offenses of which they have knowledge, and in accordance with the instructions of their superior officers, to discover and collect all information required for crime prevention and detection.

3. ↑ CGCT, art. L. 2212–6

4. ↑ CGCT, art. L. 2212–8

7. ↑ Art. L 412-49 of the Code of Commons.

8. ↑ Art. L 412-51 of the Code of Commons

10. ↑ Art. 412-53 of the Code of Commons

== Bibliography ==
- Franck Denion, Police municipale : missions et moyens, Editions Territoriales, municipal police missions and means Territoriales Editions, June 2006.
