= Porte de Vincennes =

Entrance of Paris

Coordinates: 48°50′50″N 2°24′40″E

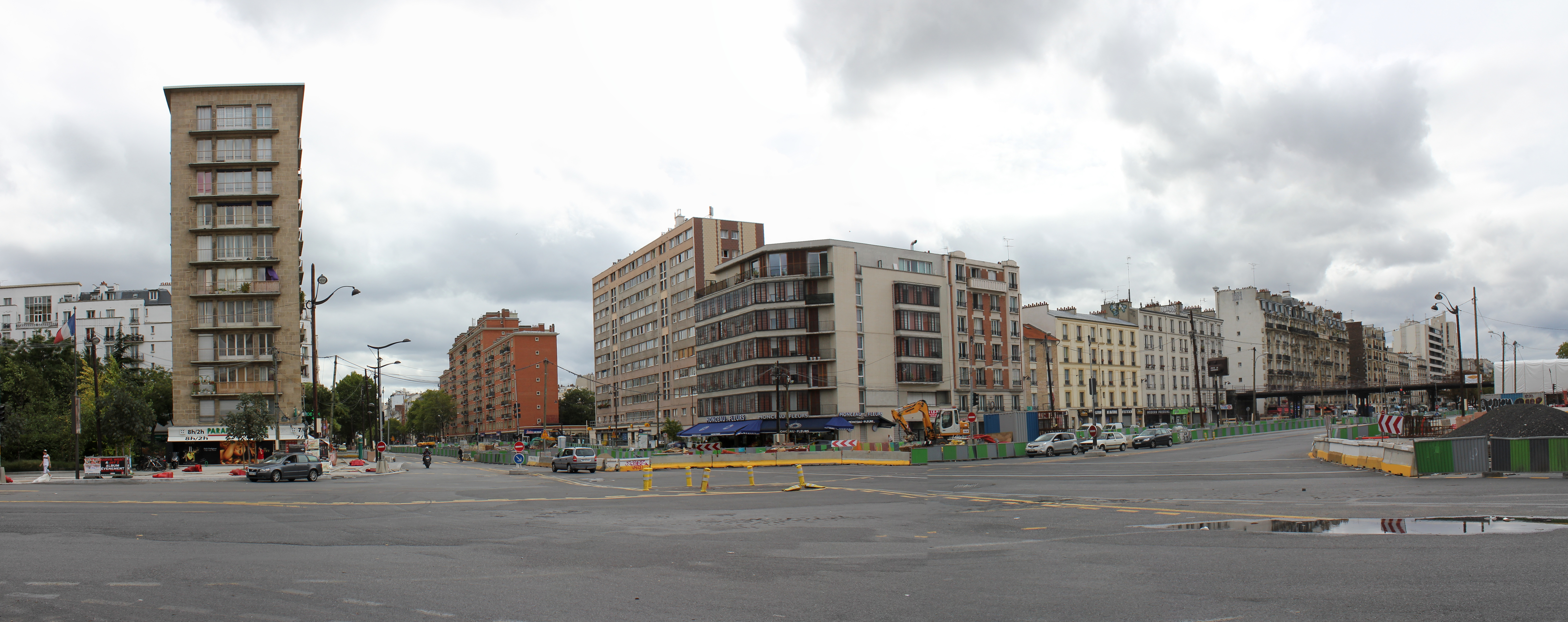
Porte de Vincennes during the construction of T3 tram line

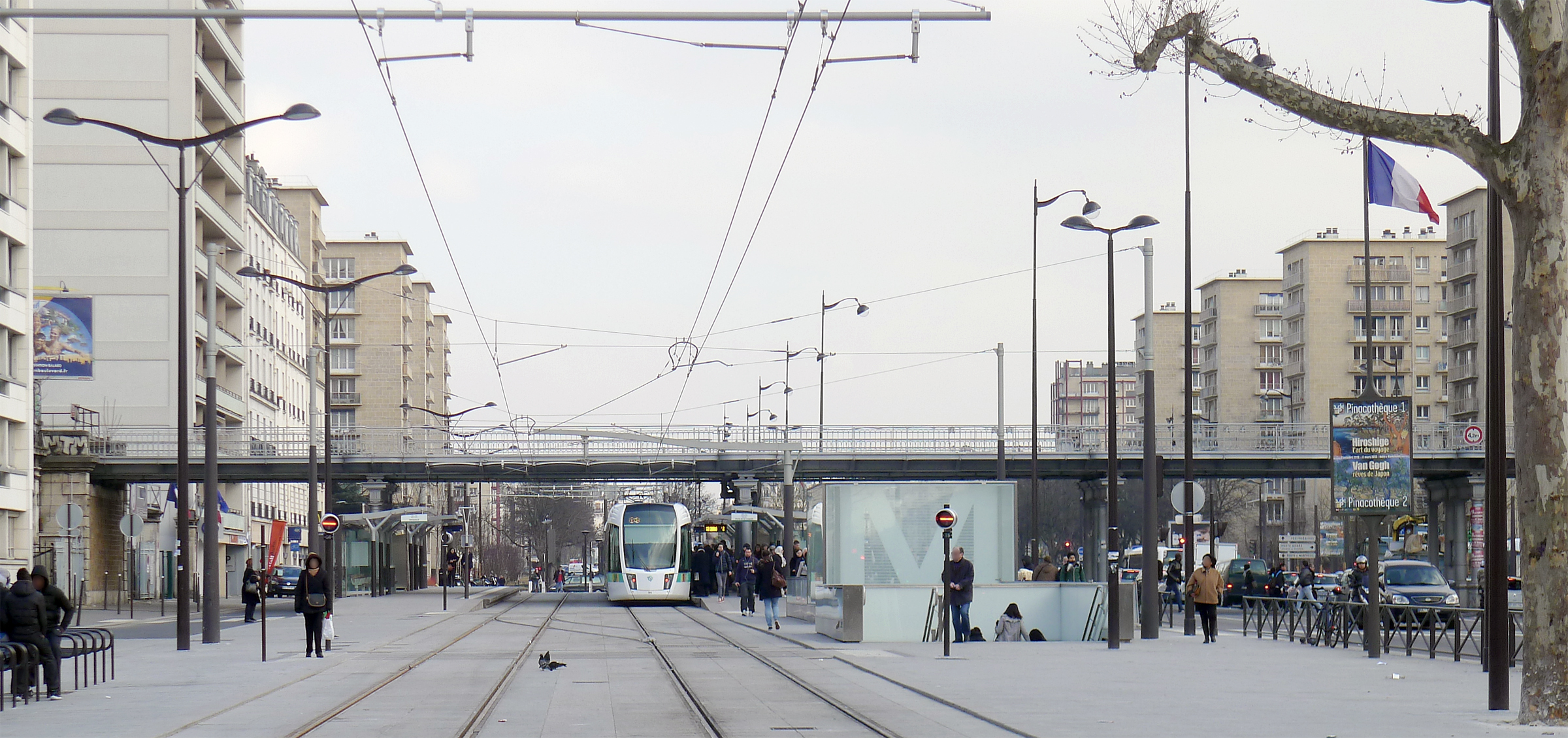
Tram stop at Porte de Vincennes

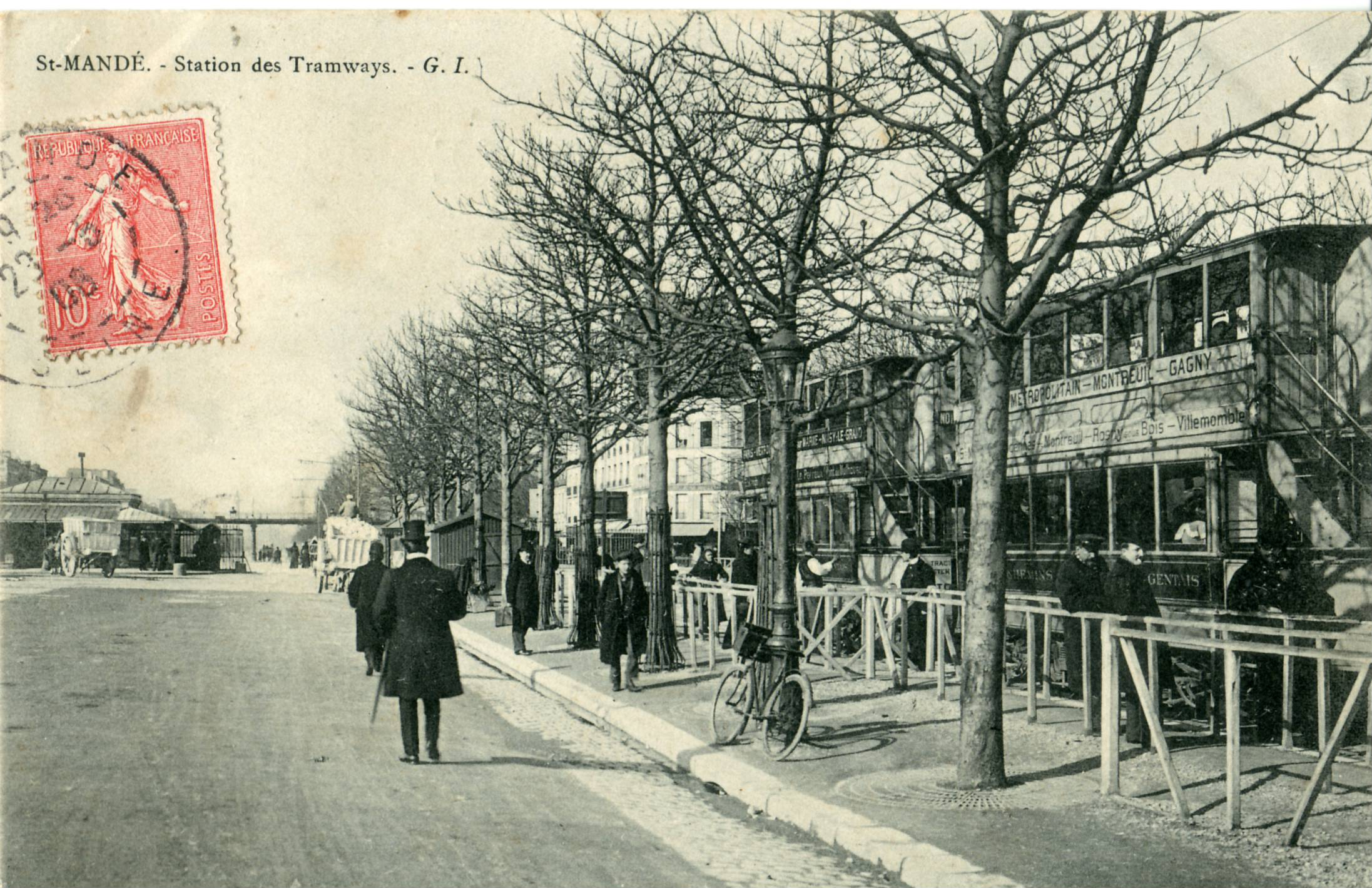
The porte de Vincennes at the beginning of the twentieth century as seen from Saint-Mandé, at the level of the tramway station for Nogentais Railways.

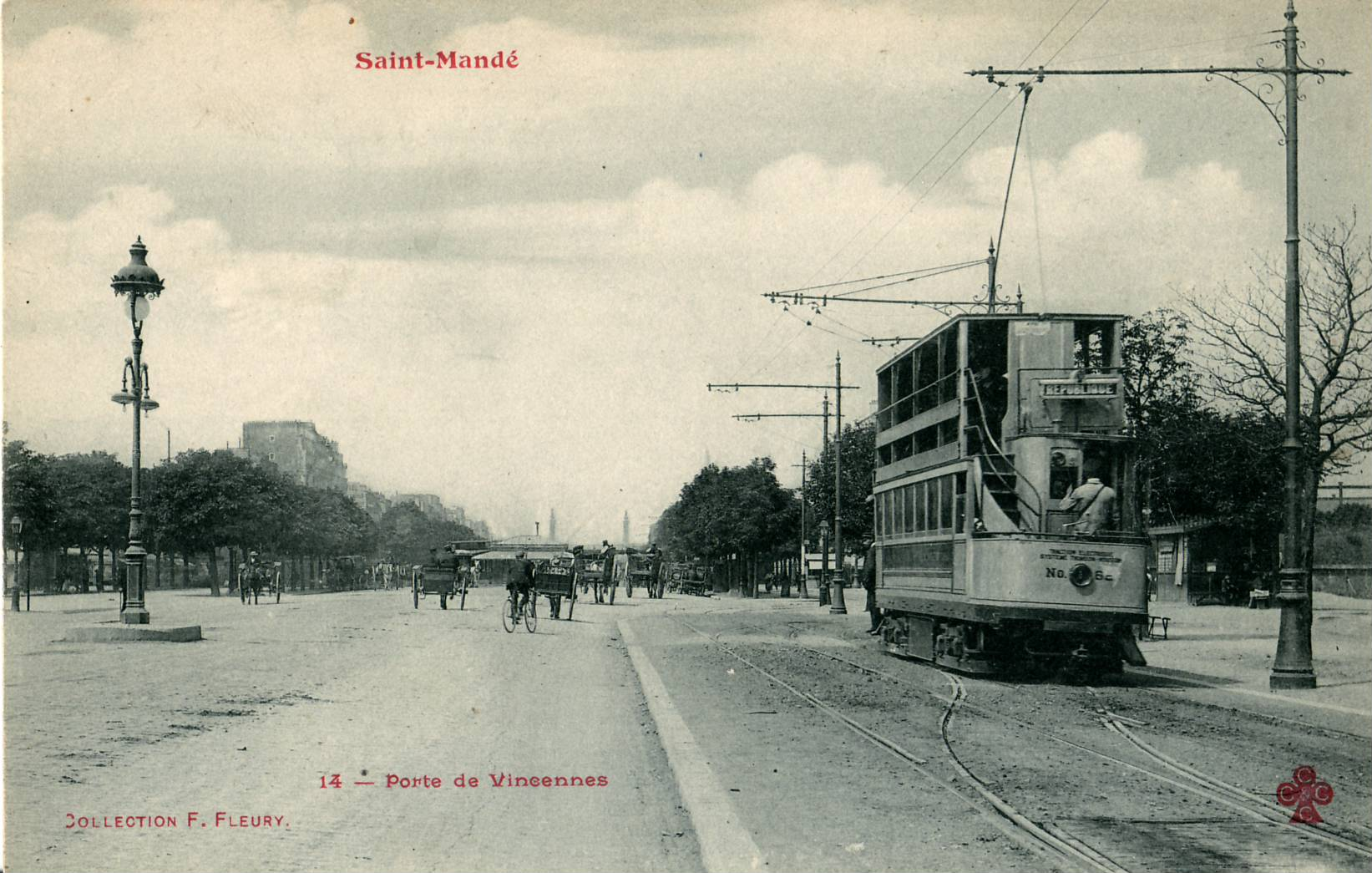
Another view showing a tram proceeding toward the Place de la République

The Porte de Vincennes (French pronunciation: [pɔʁt də vɛ̃sɛn]) is one of the city gates of Paris (France) situated in the Bel Air neighborhood of the 12th arrondissement.

== Location ==
The Porte de Vincennes is located where the northeast corner of the 12th arrondissement meets the southeast corner of the 20th arrondissement of Paris. The site is, more or less, delimited in the west by the Rue des Pyrénées and the Avenue du Docteur-Arnold-Netter; on the east, it is abutted by the Boulevard Davout and the Boulevard Soult. The road that actually passes through the 'porte' is the Cours de Vincennes, a major road that separates the two arrondissements.

The Porte de Vincennes is one of the principal breaches in the eastern section of the Thiers wall. It permits access to the neighboring suburbs of Saint-Mandé and Vincennes.

== The neighborhood ==
The Porte de Vincennes is the site of one of the largest outdoor markets in Paris, a market which is held on Wednesday mornings and Saturday mornings along the Cours de Vincennes.

Two of the most important lycées (high schools or preparatory schools) in the east of Paris are here. They are called the Lycée Hélène-Boucher and the Lycée Maurice-Ravel.

Also nearby is the Saint Gabriel church constructed during the 1920s and run, ever since, by the fathers of the Congregation of the Sacred Hearts of Jesus and Mary.

== In popular culture ==
The Porte de Vincennes is the place where the character Valmont dies in the epistolary novel Les Liaisons dangereuses (Dangerous Liaisons) by Choderlos de Laclos. He is invited there by his adversary, Danceny, for a duel.

Vous voulez bien vous trouver demain, entre huit et neuf heures du matin, à la porte du bois de Vincennes.

== Transportation ==
Since it is at the crossroads of the Cours de Vincennes and the boulevards of the marshals, with direct access to the Boulevard Périphérique, the principal beltway encircling Paris, and since it is the origin of National Route 34 (RN 34), the Porte de Vincennes is in the center of an area of high-density automobile traffic.

As for public transportation, it is served by Line 1 of the Paris metro at its Porte de Vincennes station, as well as several RATP bus lines. Here also is the terminus of Line 3 of the Île-de-France tramway system, which serves the eastern suburbs and connecting service for the Porte de la Chapelle.

== See also ==
- Porte de Vincennes siege
