= Rue de Rennes =

Street in Paris, France

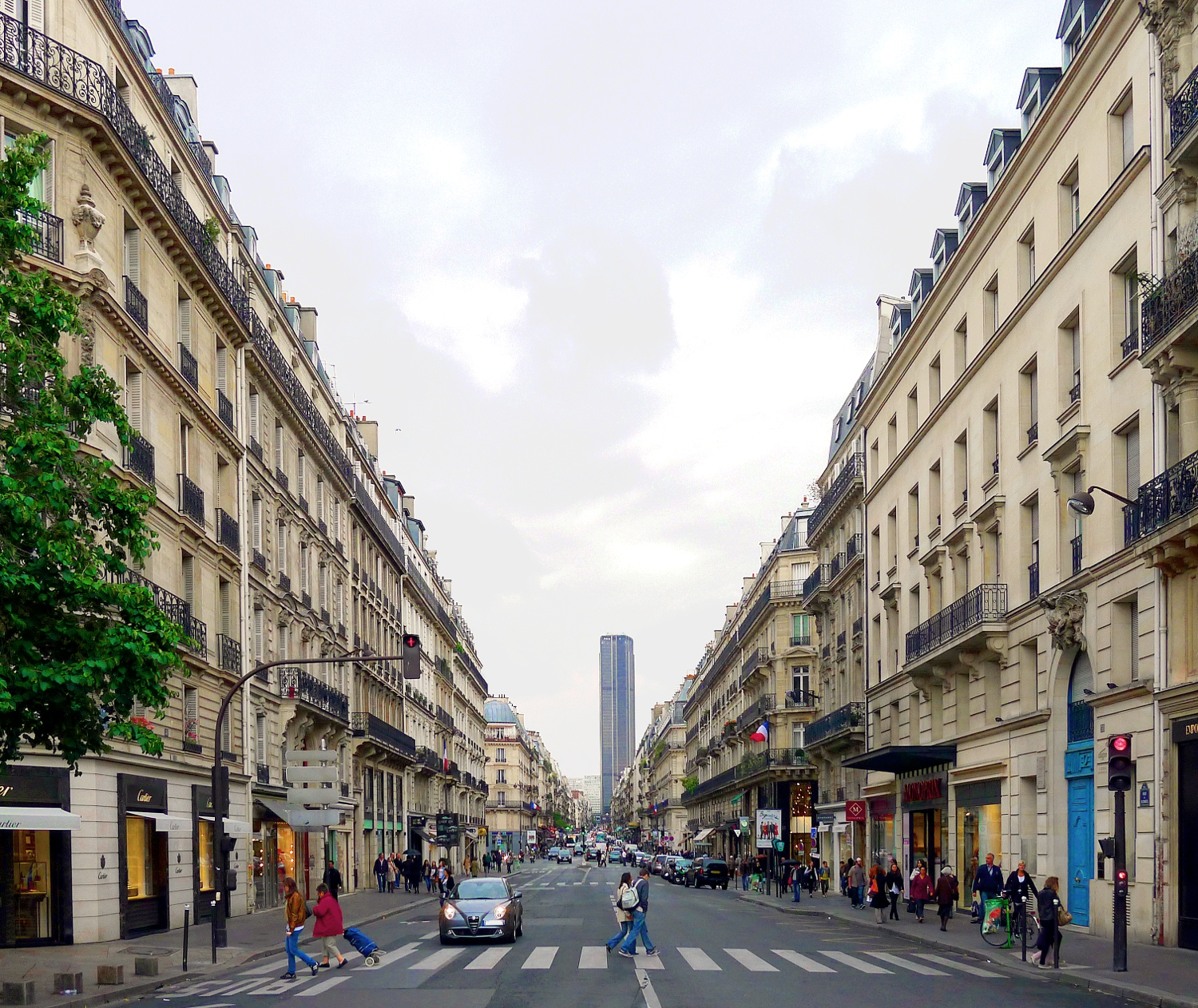
The Rue de Rennes

The Rue de Rennes (French pronunciation: [ʁy d(ə) ʁɛn]; lit. 'Street of Rennes') is a thoroughfare in the 6th arrondissement of Paris. It is a major shopping street on the left bank of the capital.

== Location and access ==
The Rue de Rennes begins at the Place du Québec and ends at Place du 18-Juin-1940 (formerly Place de Rennes). It is a straight north–south street, over one kilometre long and twenty metres wide. Opened in the mid-nineteenth century, it is a recent thoroughfare in terms of Paris history: its buildings, of fairly homogeneous scale, are all post-1850.

The Rue de Rennes is served by Line 4 of the Paris Métro at Saint-Germain-des-Prés, Saint-Sulpice and Saint-Placide stations, Line 12 at Rennes station and Lines 4, 6, 12 and 13 at Montparnasse–Bienvenüe station.

== Name origin ==
The street is named after the city of Rennes, because in 1853, the street ended at the "Gare de Rennes", today the Gare de Paris-Montparnasse, from which lines serving Brittany depart.

== History ==
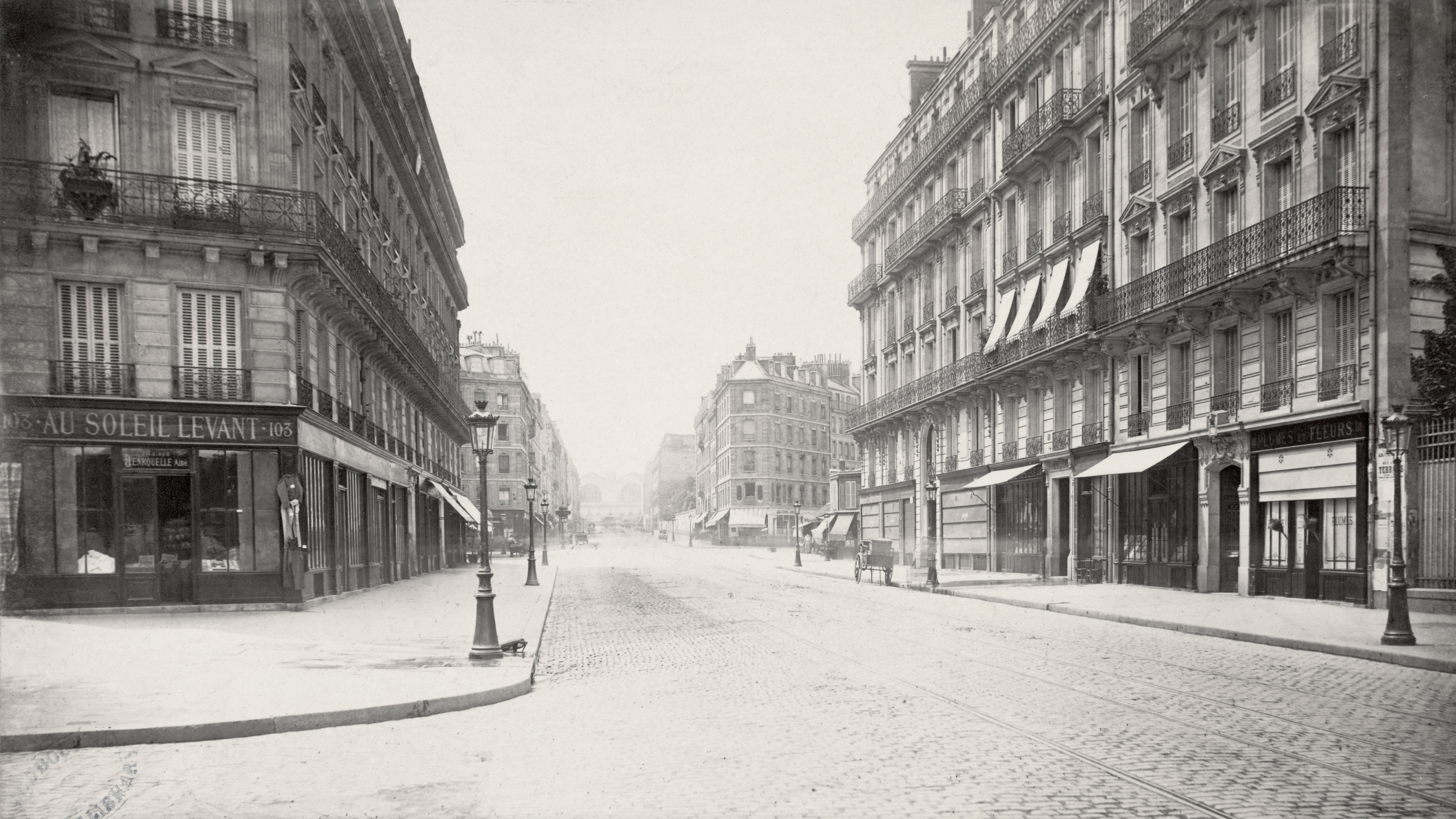
Rue de Rennes c. 1853–70 (photograph attributed to Charles Marville), from Boulevard Raspail, towards the station.

Rue de Rennes was built during the Second Empire. It was originally intended to join the Seine. For this reason, the numbering begins at 41, the previous numbers having been reserved for the part of the street that was to be cut north of Boulevard Saint-Germain. The existing section was excavated twice.

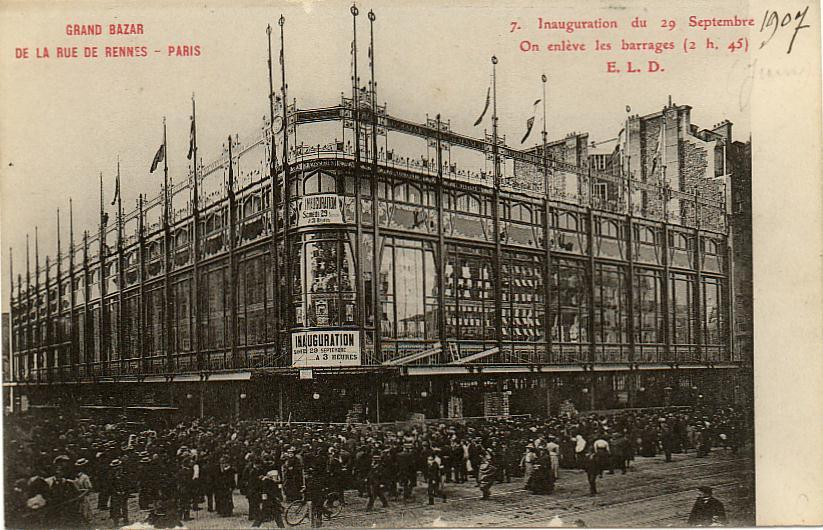
The Grand Bazar on the Rue de Rennes, 1907.

It was opened by decree on 9 March 1853, from Rue Notre-Dame-des-Champs and Rue de Vaugirard to Place du 18-Juin-1940. The plan appended to this decree gave the road a width of just 20 meters. However, it was opened up, following different alignments, to a width of 22 m, as shown on the plan appended to the decree of 25 July 1855, setting its level between the Rue de Vaugirard and Place du 18-Juin-1940.

The second section, from Boulevard Saint-Germain to the Rue de Vaugirard and Rue du Regard, follows the decree of 28 July 1866. The construction of this thoroughfare led to the disappearance of several streets:

- Rue Beurrière,
- Rue-neuve Guillemin,
- Rue de l'Égout,
- Carrefour Saint-Benoît.

The third section was never built; the route finally chosen involved the destruction of the Institut de France.

In 1880, the point where the Rue de Rennes meets the Boulevard du Montparnasse was renamed "Place de Rennes" (now Place du 18-Juin-1940). In 1977, the area in contact with Place Saint-Germain-des-Prés became part of the latter.

On 30 March 1918, during the First World War, a shell fired by Big Bertha exploded at the corner of the Rue de Rennes and Boulevard Raspail. The following day, another shell exploded at no. 106.

The bombing of 17 September 1986, which took place in front of the Tati store at nos. 140-140 bis, is commonly known as the "Rue de Rennes bombing". It was the deadliest attack of the September 1986 series, with 7 dead and around 60 injured. The entire series, which began on 4 September, resulted in a total of 11 fatalities. Carried out in broad daylight, it was claimed by CSPPAC, a false name concealing Hezbollah acting on behalf of Iran, which demanded the release of Lebanese leader Georges Ibrahim Abdallah. The leader of the terrorist commando responsible for the attacks, Fouad Ali Salah, was arrested in March 1987. A plaque inaugurated by President François Mitterrand honours the memory of the victims.

The Rue de Rennes was redeveloped in the early 2010s. The first stage, involving the southern section between Place du 18-Juin-1940 and Boulevard Raspail, was launched in May 2011 and completed on 30 June 2012, with the widening of sidewalks, the creation of bicycle lanes and delivery spaces. To make these improvements possible, the bus lanes have been removed, although four bus lines, including two Mobilien lines, run on them.

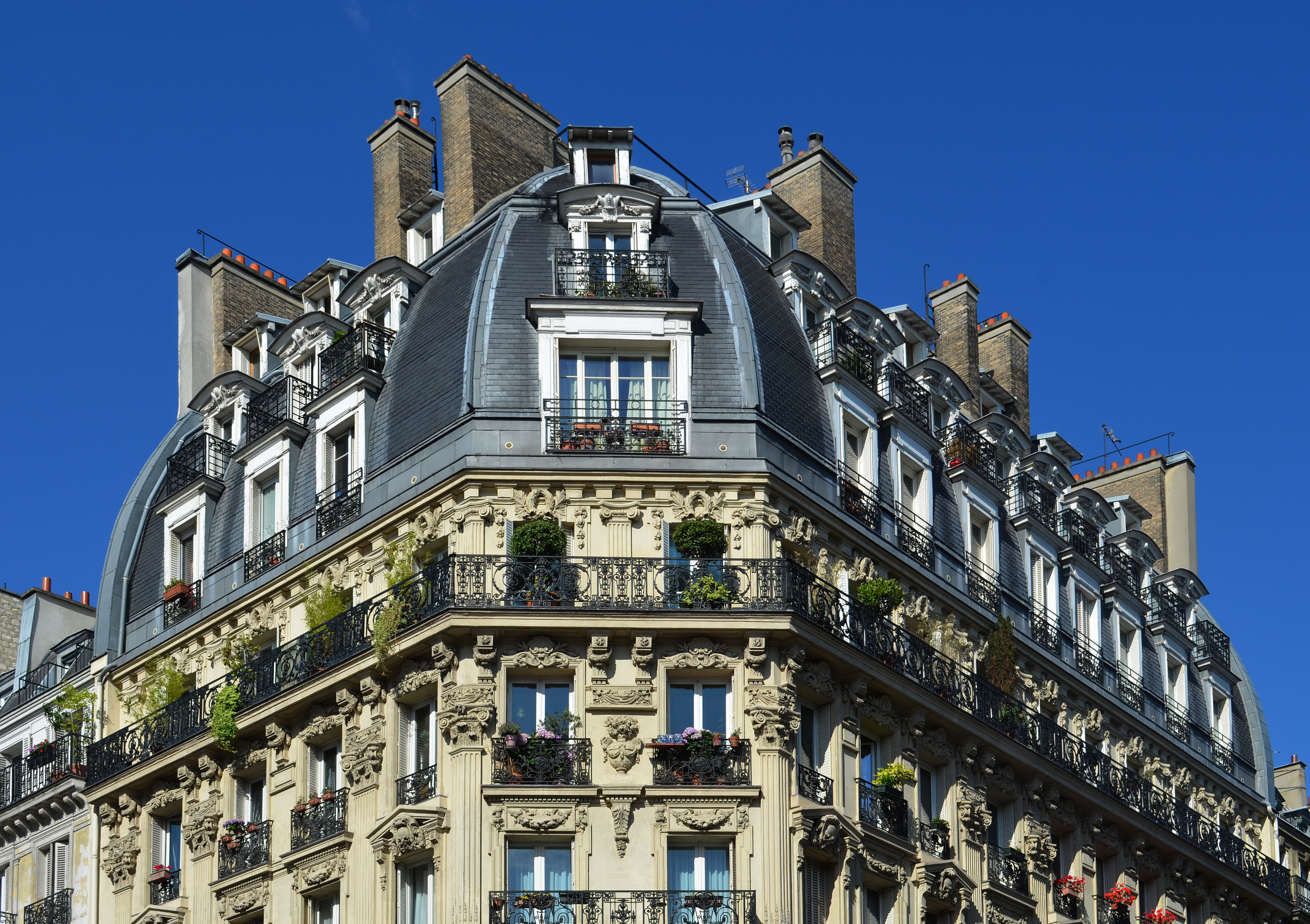
Late Haussmann building at no. 72.

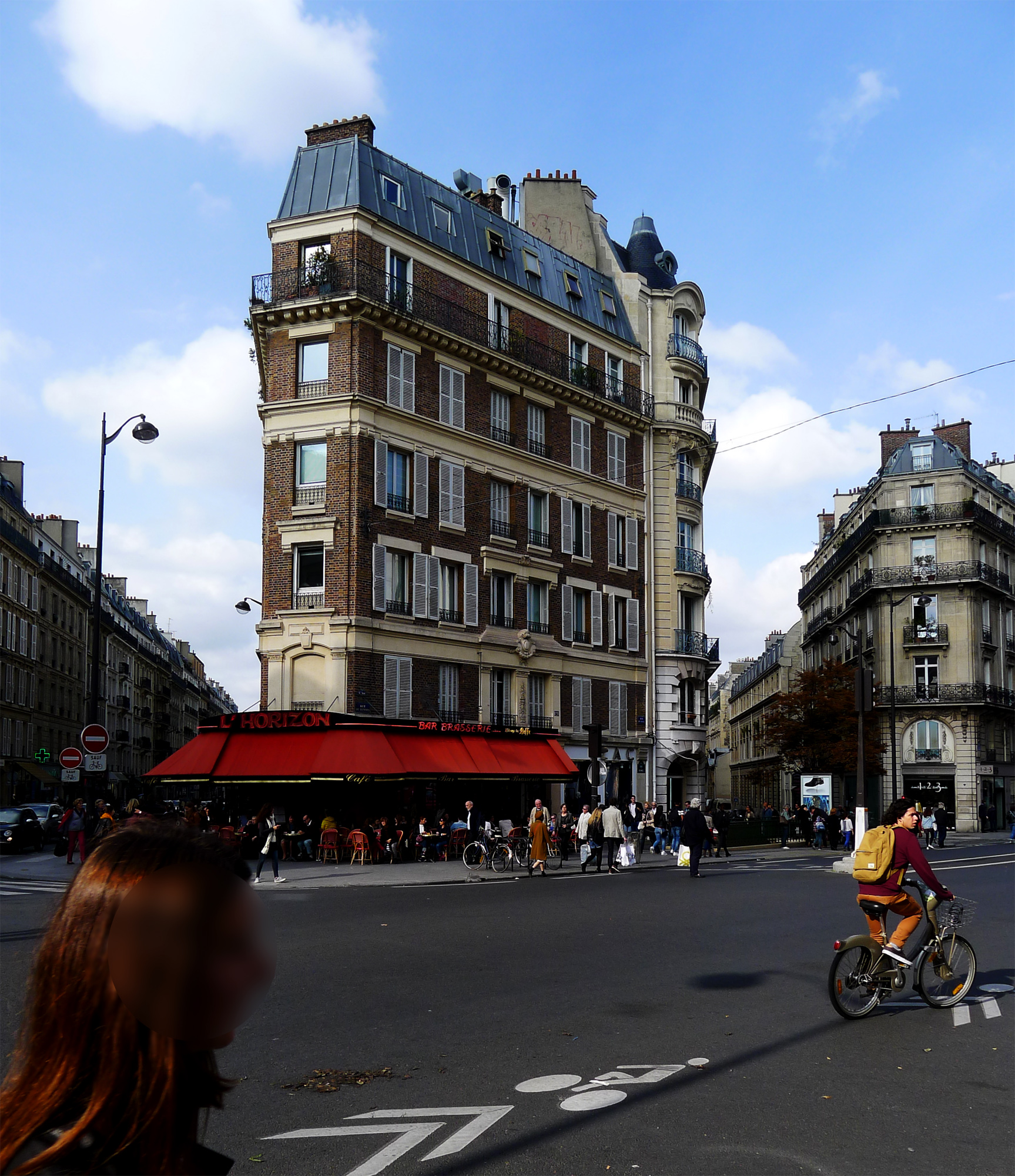
No. 120: building towards the middle of the street.

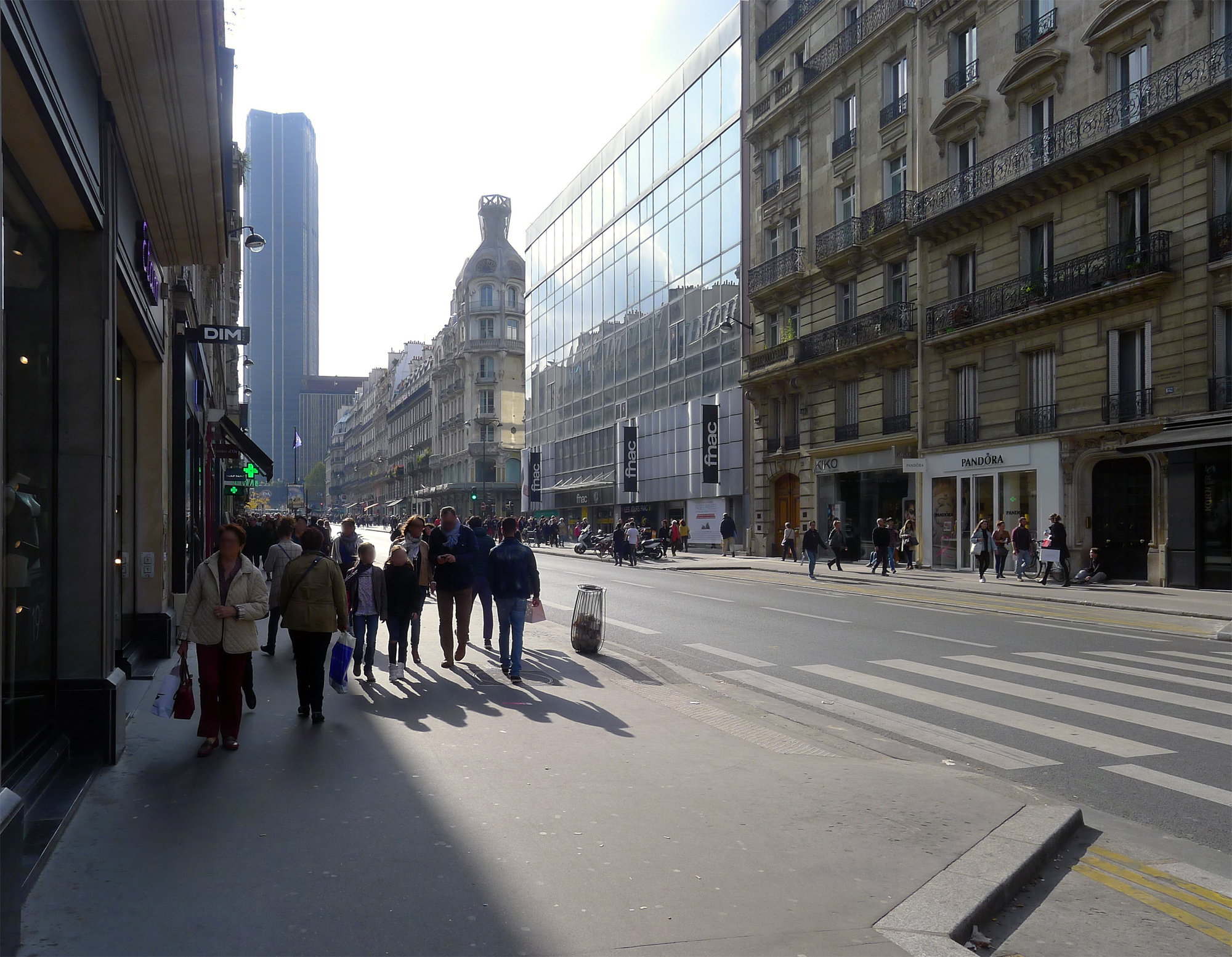
The southern end of the street; in the background, the Montparnasse Tower and Paris-Montparnasse station.

== Remarkable buildings and places of memory ==
- François Hollande and Ségolène Royal lived on this street in the 1980s, reportedly at no. 22 or no. 24, though the exact number remains unconfirmed in some sources.
- No. 44: on March 22, 1895, the Lumière brothers gave their first private screening of a projected film here, before the Société d'encouragement pour l'industrie nationale.
- No. 46: painter Charles Wislin (1852–1932) lived here.
- No. 50: above the doorway is a bas-relief depicting Saint Marguerite's dragon, created in 1732 by Paul-Ambroise Slodtz. It originally stood above a gateway leading to an inner courtyard, the Cour du Dragon. The courtyard was demolished in the mid-20th century. The portal, which had been removed in 1935 to make way for a concrete building, was later classified as a historic monument (in 1962). The original bas-relief is now preserved in Louvre Museum; the version visible on the current building is a copy.
- No. 54: Charles Pigeon died here.
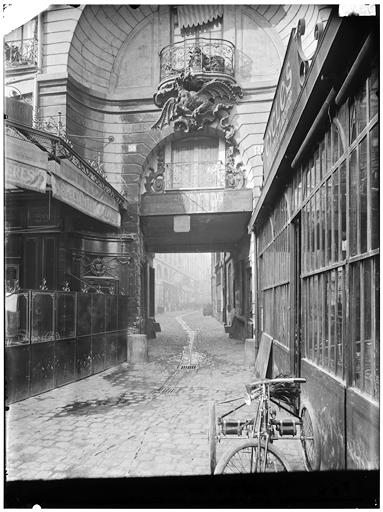
View of the entrance to the Cour du Dragon.

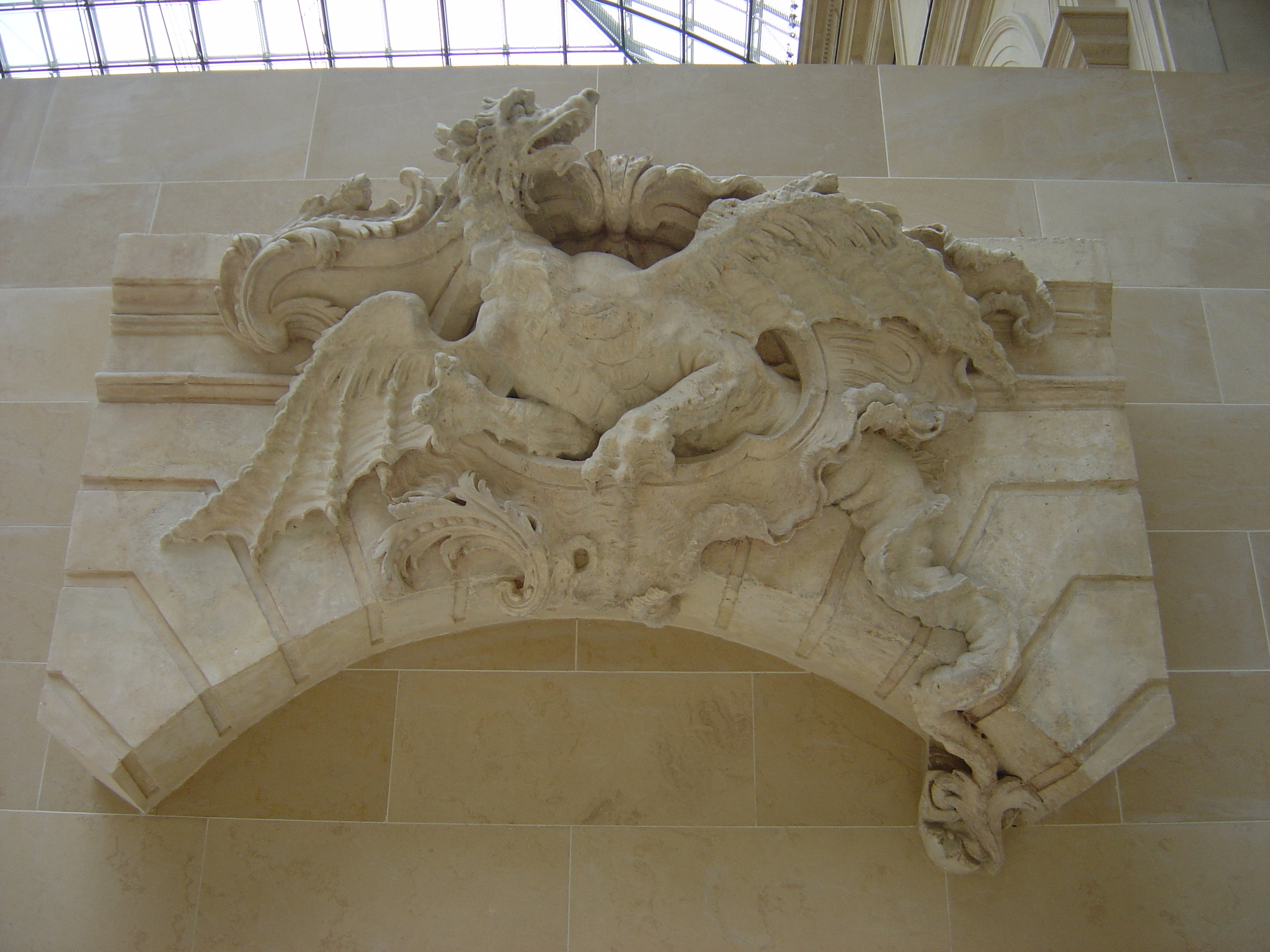
Au Dragon sign by Paul-Ambroise Slodtz (Louvre).

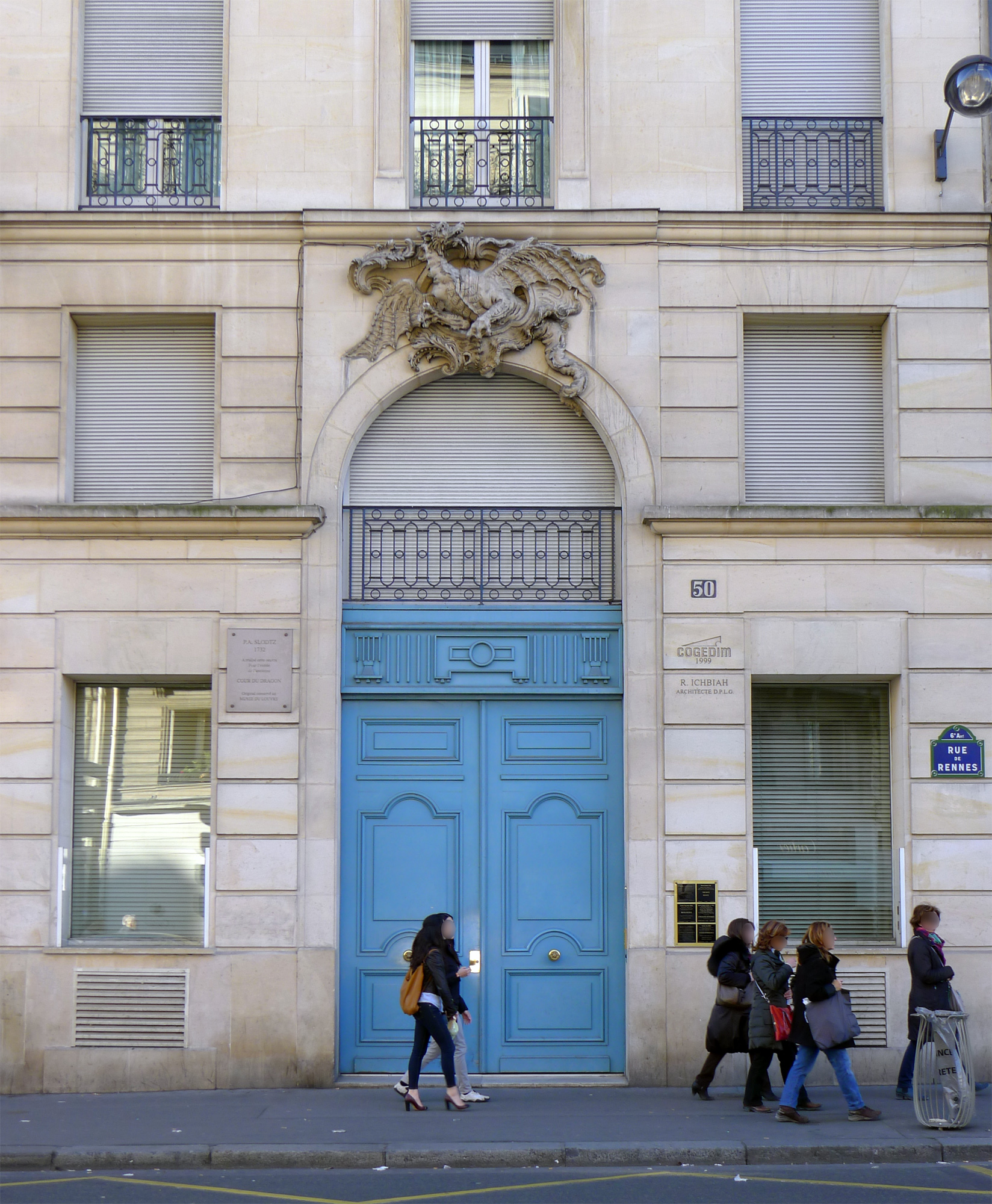
Copy of Le Dragon bas-relief at no. 50.
- No 62: Gaston Prost (1881–1967), painter and lithographer, lived here.
- No 64: during the siege of Paris, Bourg-la-Reine's town council met here from September 1870 to March 14, 1871, first in the former building No 43, boulevard Saint-Germain (the present building dates from 1890), then here, with Jean Alphonse Gosse as mayor.
- No 71: in 1919, Simone de Beauvoir, who was still a child and had been living until then in the beautiful apartment where she was born in 1908, at 103, boulevard du Montparnasse, her family having suffered reverses of fortune, moved to this new address, to a less plush apartment on the sixth floor, with no elevator or running water; she lived there until 1929.
- No. 76: L'Arlequin cinema.
- From 1948 to 1956, part of the building's basement housed the cabaret-theater La Rose Rouge (150 seats), directed by Nikos Papatakis (1918–2010), who had co-founded it when it opened in 1947 in a restaurant of the same name at 53, rue de la Harpe. The fiction film La Rose rouge (1951) by Marcel Pagliero (1907–1980) captures the ambience of the place.
- No. 112: former Crédit municipal de Paris building. Since 1983, the André-Malraux library.
- No. 129: architect Theodor Josef Hubert Hoffbauer (1829–1922) lived here in 1868.
- Nos. 136-138: former Grand bazar building on rue de Rennes, inaugurated on September 29, 1906, by architect Henri Gutton (who made his mark in Nancy with the Art Nouveau movement). The building's metal beams come from the workshops of engineer Armand Moisant. In 1910, it became the Grands Magasins de la rue de Rennes, which in the 1920s became the property of Magasins Réunis. In 1974, the building became a Fnac store, the first in Montparnasse to sell books.
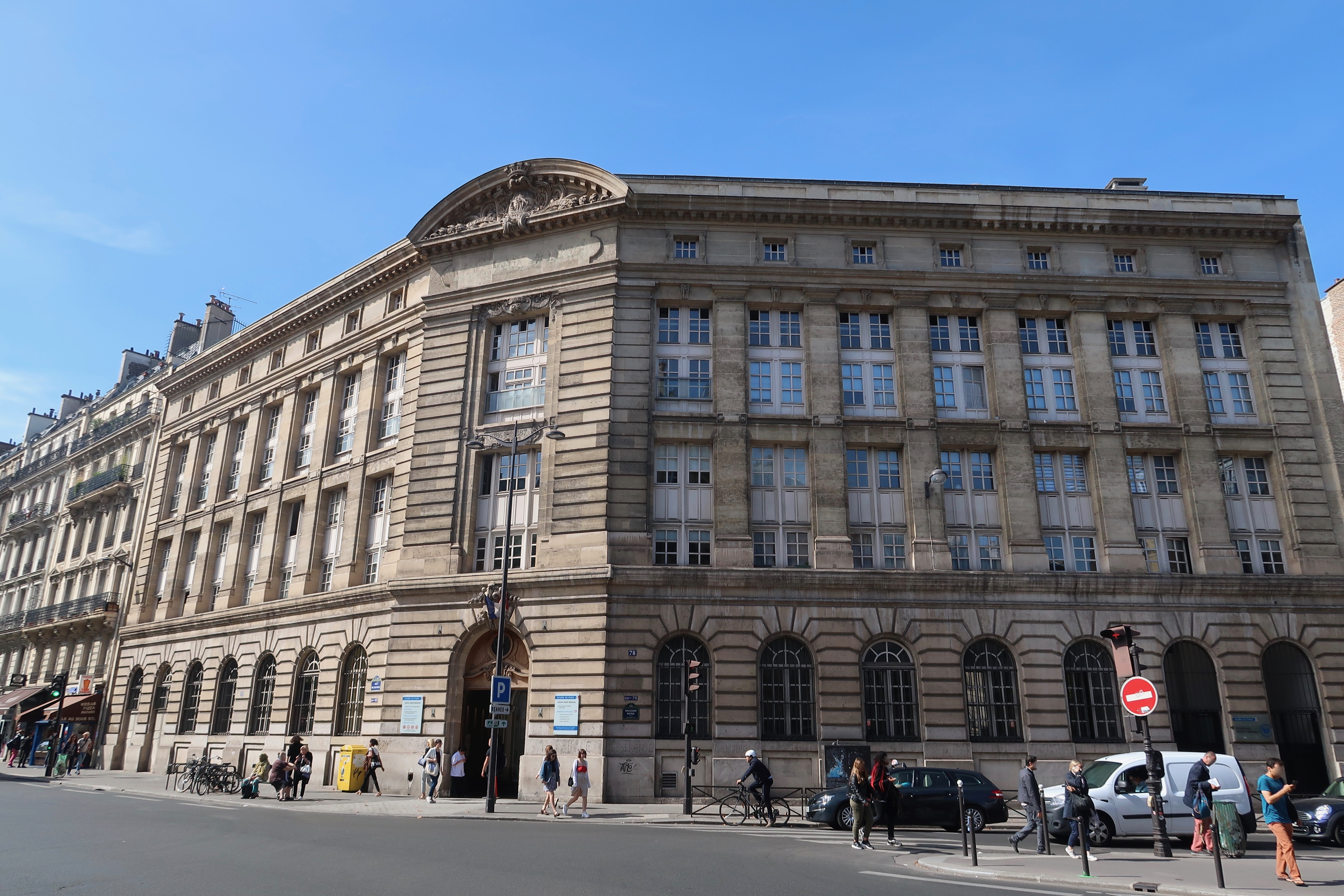
No. 112: André-Malraux Library.

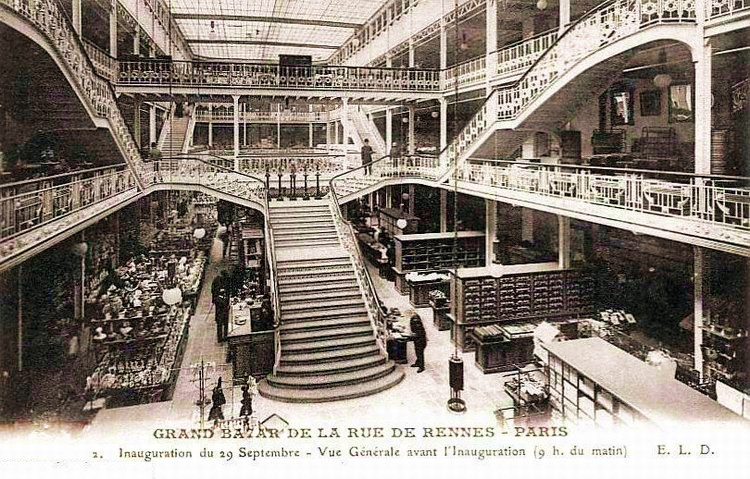
Nos. 136-138: Interior of the former Grand Bazaar.

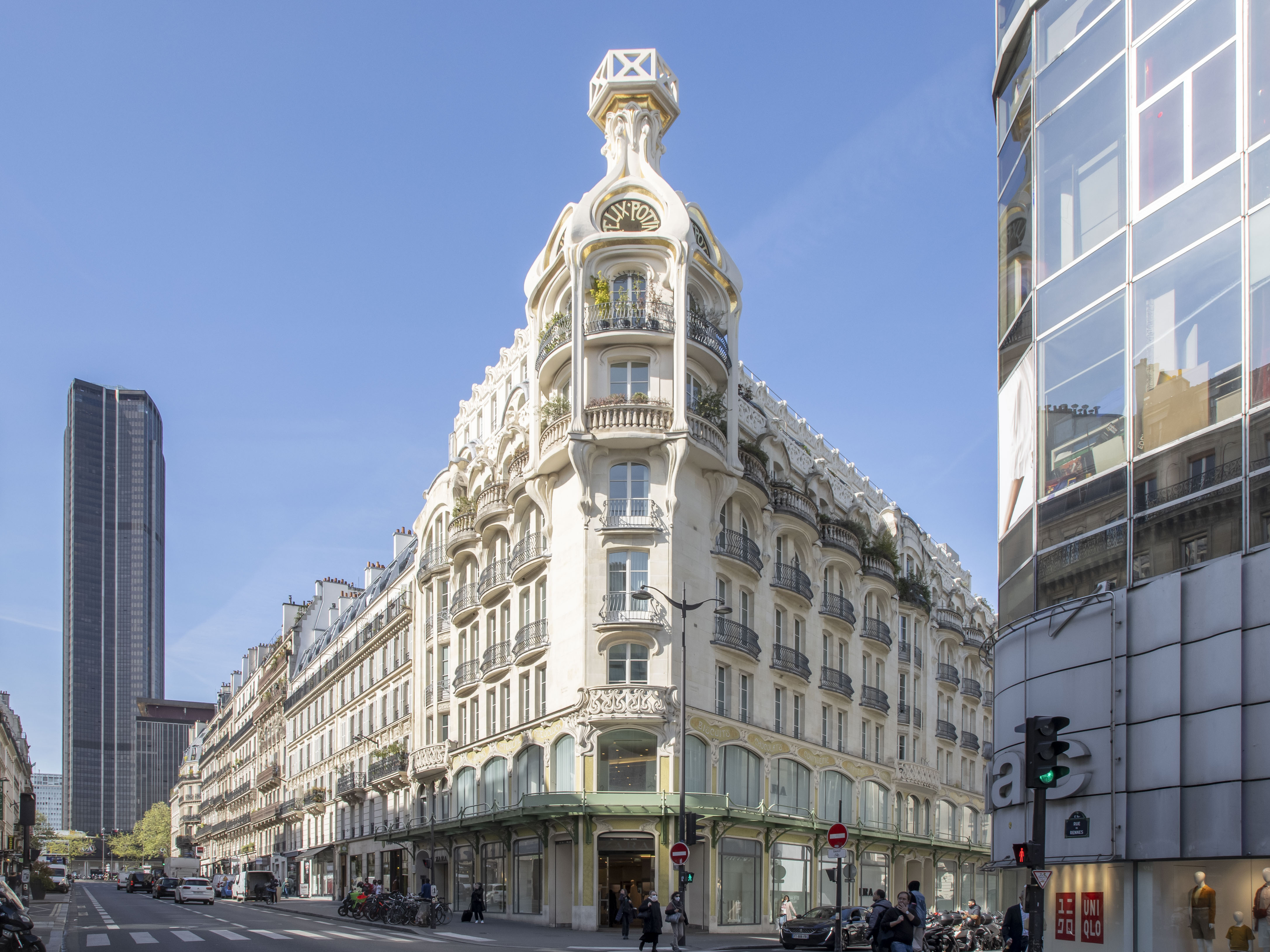
Nos. 140-140 bis: Former Félix Potin building.
- No. 140-140 bis: building of the former Félix Potin store, opened in 1904, designed by architect Paul Auscher, a six-storey food superstore richly decorated in Art Nouveau style, which notably offered a “cuisine service for the city” with its catering department. The building's facade and roof are listed historic monuments. The building was later taken over by Tati. The Rue de Rennes bombing took place here on September 17, 1986. The shopping area is now occupied by Zara.
- No. 153: site of the first church of the Notre-Dame-des-Champs parish, created in 1858. This wooden building was replaced by the new Notre-Dame-des-Champs church, built from 1867 to 1876 on the corner of boulevard du Montparnasse and rue du Montparnasse. The original wooden structure was dismantled and moved to Fermanville (Normandy) in 1931, where it was reassembled as a chapel.

== Commemorative plaques ==
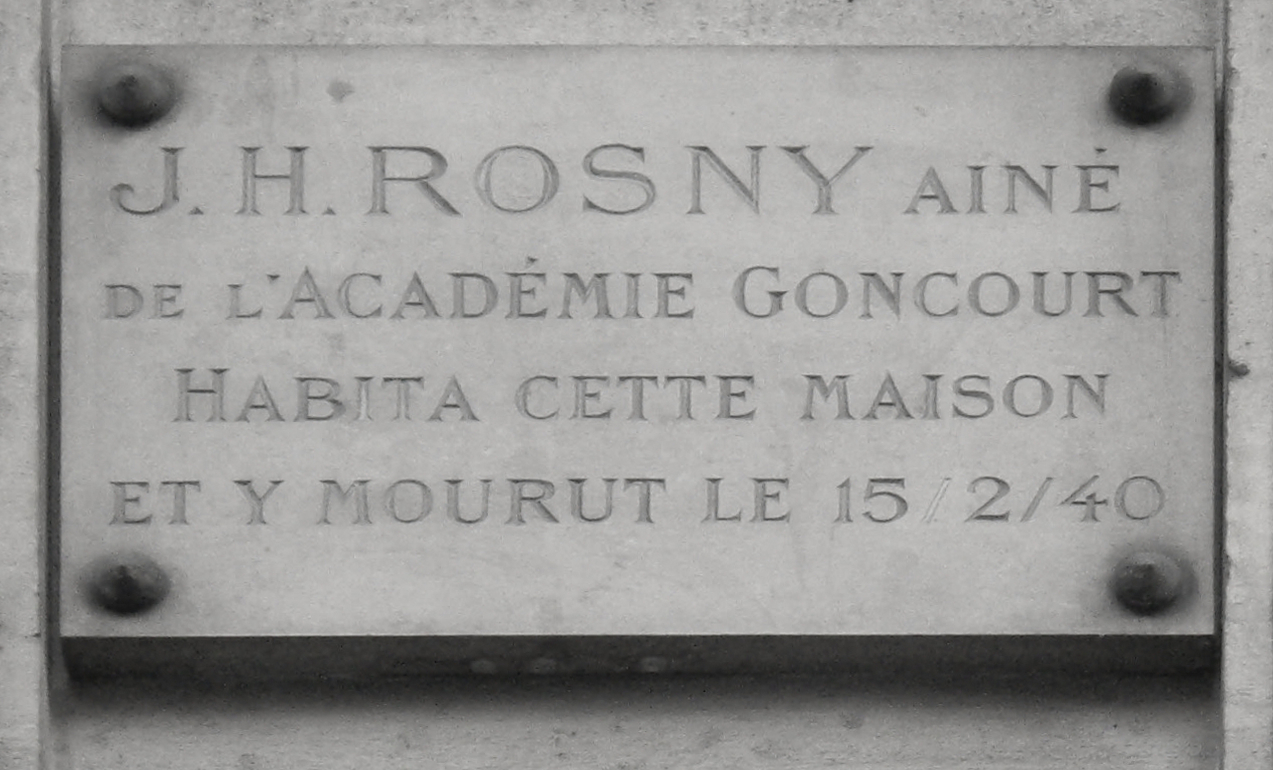
Writer J.-H. Rosny aîné died at no. 47 in 1940.

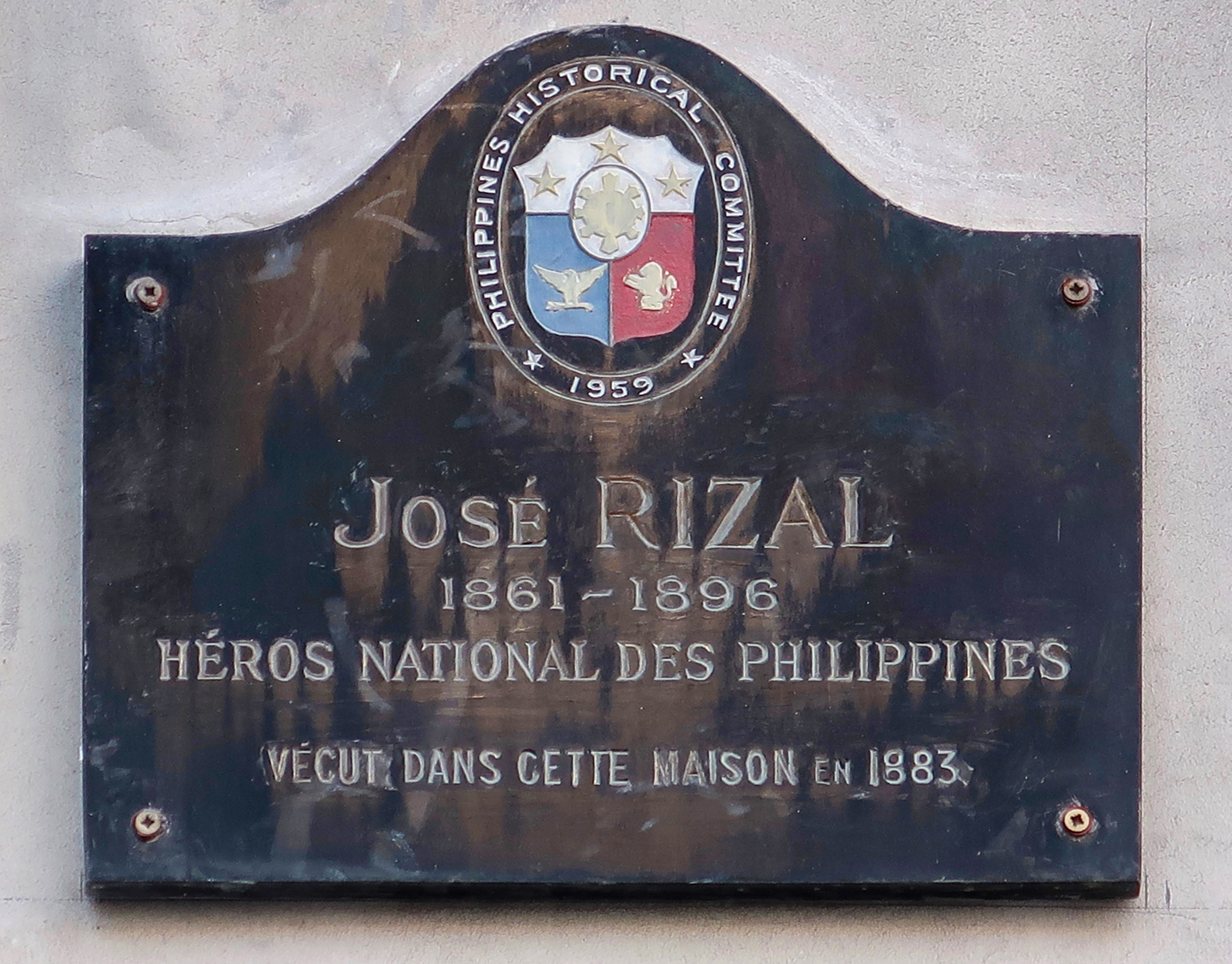
Philippine independence activist José Rizal lived at no. 124 in 1883.

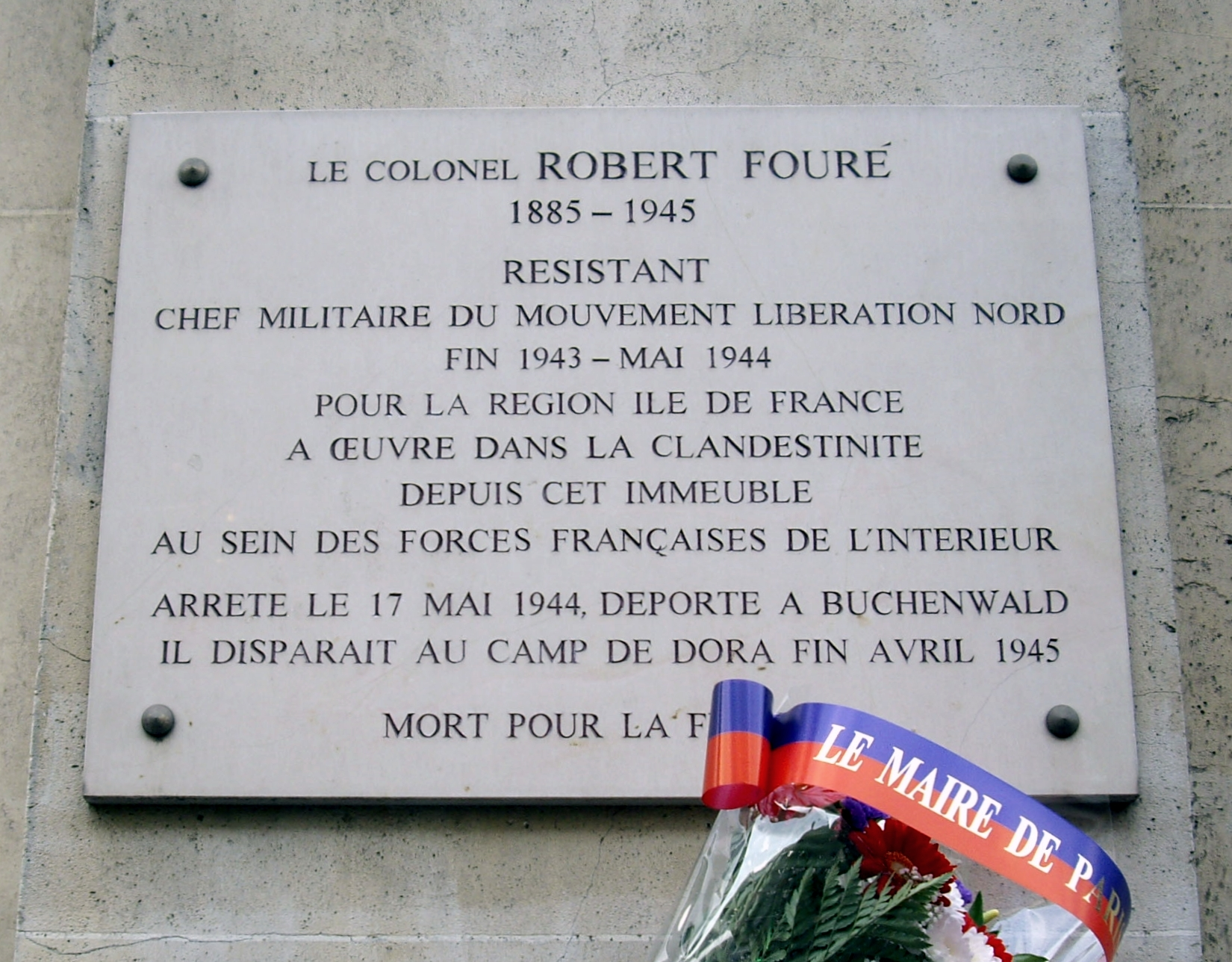
Robert Fouré, military leader of Libération-Nord, who died in deportation, lived at no. 128.

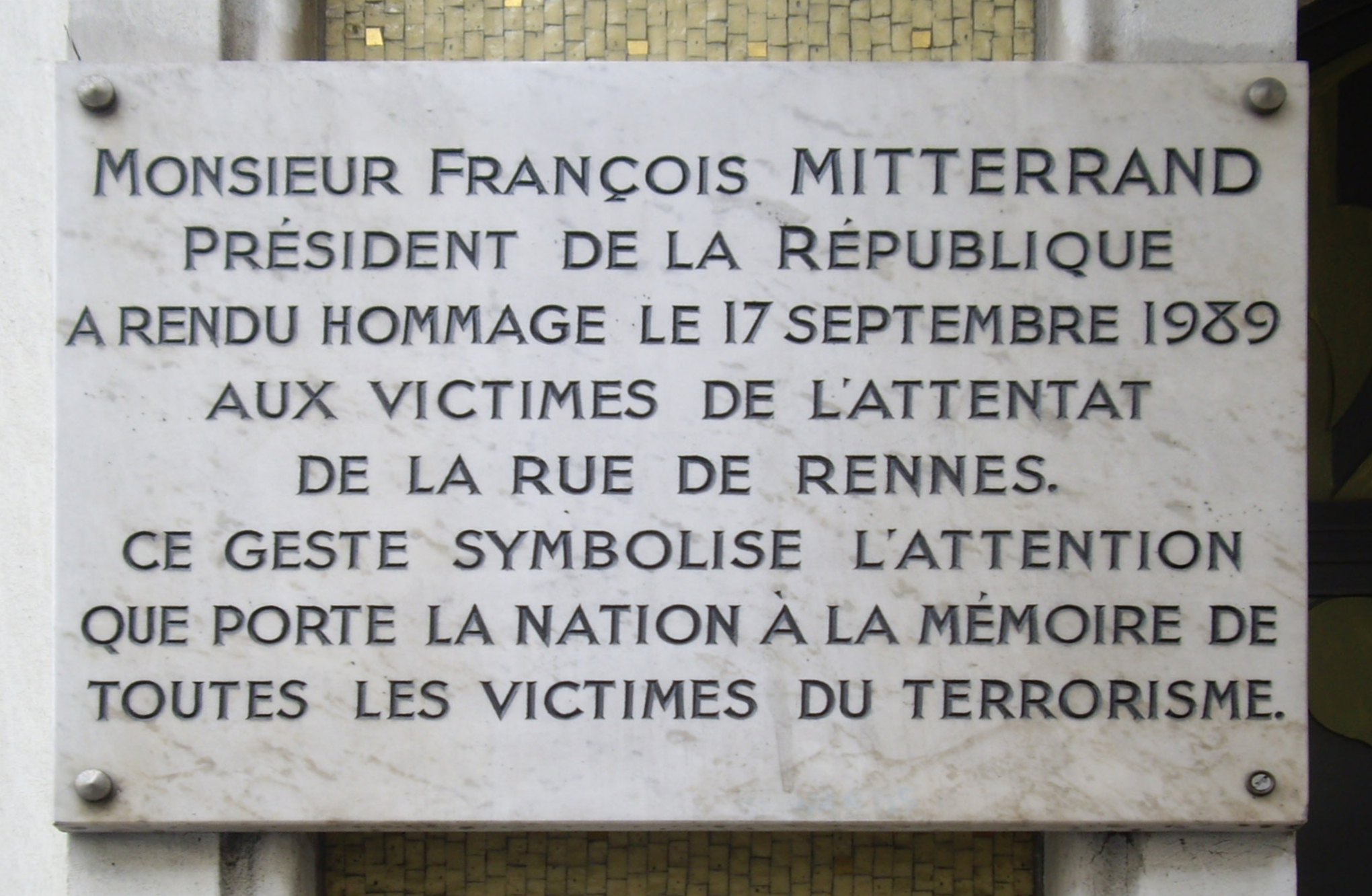
Plaque in memory of the rue de Rennes bombing at no. 140 bis.

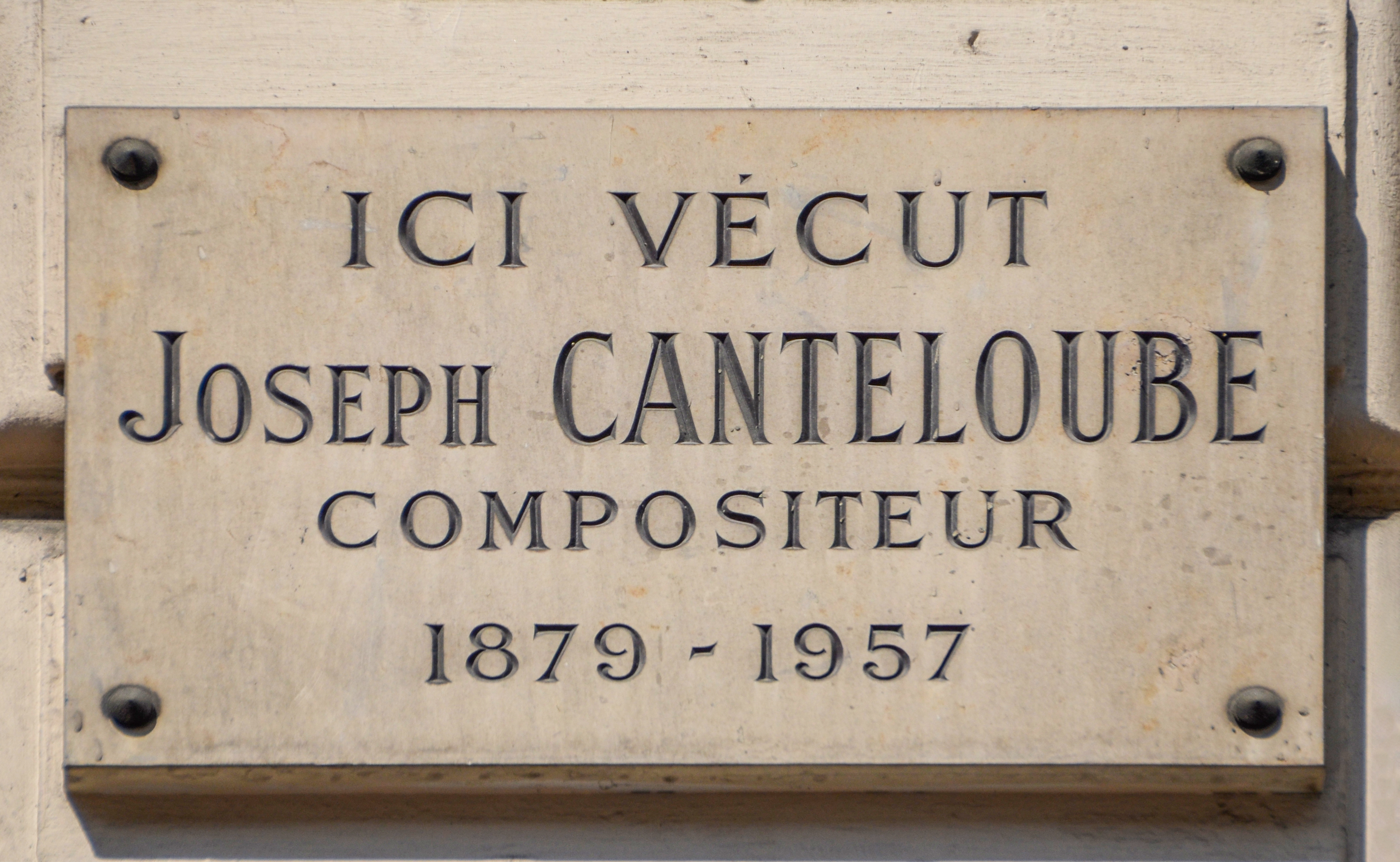
Composer Joseph Canteloube lived at no. 146.

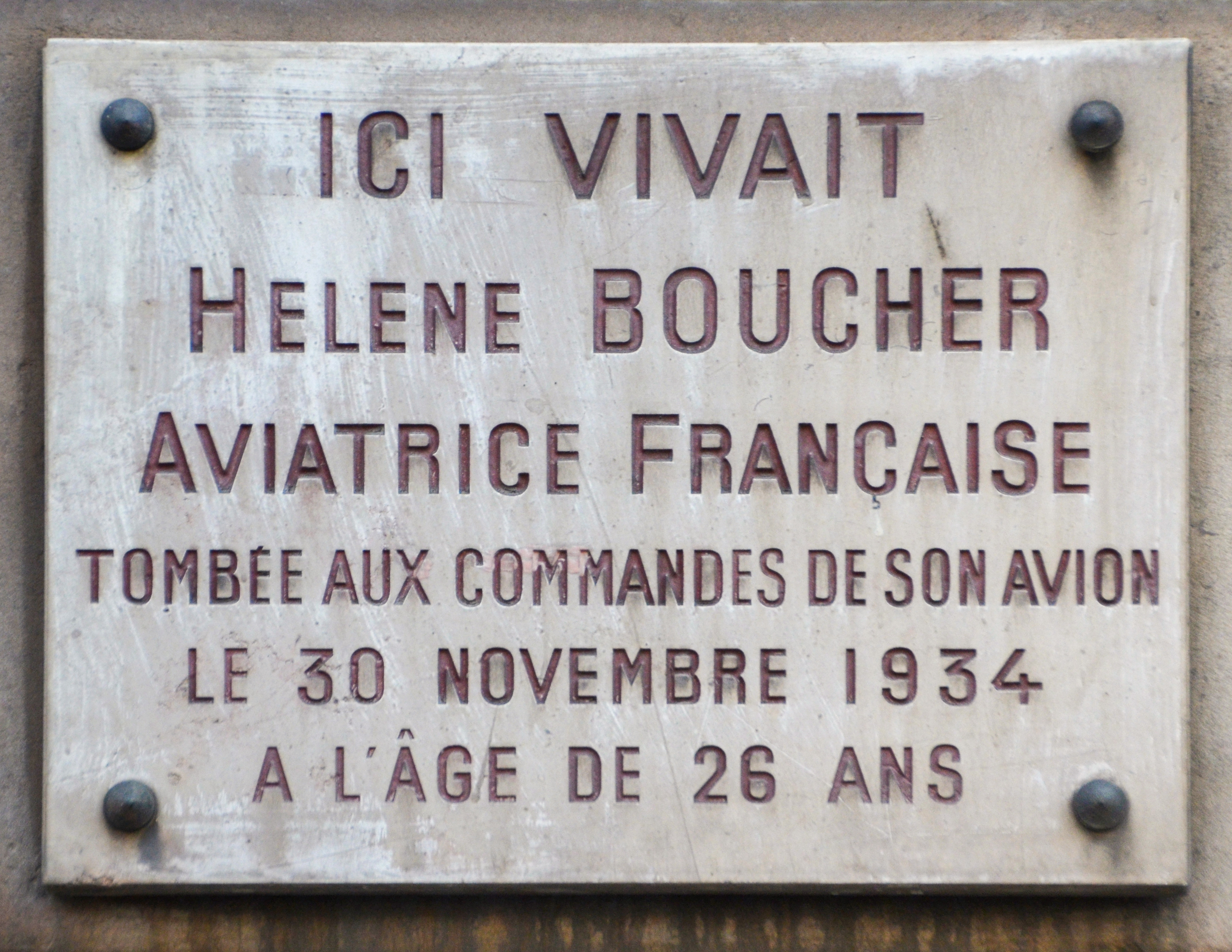
Aviatrix Hélène Boucher lived at no. 169.

== Bibliography ==
- Hénard, E (1910). Le prolongement de la rue de Rennes, à Paris, et le projet de pont en X sur la Seine (in French). Le Génie civil.
