= Henri-Edmond Canonne =

French pharmacist, businessman and art collector (1867 to 1961)

- Born: 4 September 1867; Saint-Amand-les-Eaux, France
- Died: 29 July 1961 (aged 93); Geneva, Switzerland
- Citizenship: French
- Occupations: Pharmacist, businessman, art collector
- Known for: Valda lozenges
- Awards: French Legion of Honour (1911)

Henri-Edmond Canonne was a French pharmacist, businessman and art collector, best known as the creator of the Valda throat lozenge. He also assembled a large collection of paintings, with works by Claude Monet, Pierre-Auguste Renoir and Paul Cézanne.

== Life and career ==
Canonne was born on 4 September 1867 in Saint-Amand-les-Eaux, in northern France. He first worked as a pharmacist in Lille. In 1899, he moved to Paris and opened a pharmacy at 49 rue Réaumur, opposite a Félix Potin grocery store. Alongside medicines, the shop sold a range of other goods, including cameras and mineral waters, at low prices. Canonne summed up his approach with the slogan Vendre bon pour vendre beaucoup. Vendre beaucoup pour vendre bon marché (Sell good products to sell a lot. Sell a lot to sell cheaply). He was also one of the first pharmacists to offer home delivery.

Canonne created the lozenge in 1900 and registered the trademark on 26 September of that year. The product, intended to relieve coughs and sore throats, went on sale in 1903. Its success relied heavily on advertising, notably the character of Doctor Valda, designed by the illustrator Georges Grellet and introduced in 1907. Supported by a policy of patents and franchises, the lozenge became known first in France, then in Europe and the rest of the world. Canonne was made a member of the Legion of Honour in 1911 for his contribution to French exports.

Canonne died in Geneva on 29 July 1961.

== Château d'Hennemont ==
In 1907, Canonne commissioned the architect Henri Duchampt to build the Château d'Hennemont in Saint-Germain-en-Laye as his country residence. Since 1951, the building has been used by the Lycée International de Saint-Germain-en-Laye. It is protected as a Monument historique.

== Art collection ==
Canonne assembled a large collection of paintings, with works by Claude Monet, Pierre-Auguste Renoir, Paul Cézanne, Henri-Edmond Cross, Paul Signac and Pierre Bonnard, among others. The art critic Arsène Alexandre devoted a catalogue to the collection in 1930. In 2025, his descendants sold 33 works from the collection at Christie's, including paintings by Renoir, Camille Pissarro, Bonnard, Albert Marquet, Raoul Dufy, Eugène Boudin and Maurice de Vlaminck.
