= Rue de Rennes bombing =

1986 terrorist bombing in Paris, France

- Ambulances and first responders at the scene of the explosion
- Location: Rue de Rennes, Paris, France
- Date: 17 September 1986; 5:29 PM (UTC+1)
- Attack type: Bombing
- Weapon: Homemade bomb
- Deaths: 7
- Injuries: 55
- Perpetrators: CSPPA; Hezbollah in France; Fouad Saleh; Emile Abdallah
- Motive: Terrorism

The Rue de Rennes bombing took place on 17 September 1986, when a handmade bomb planted by Hezbollah militants detonated outside of the Le Point Headquarters Building and Tati Store, both located at 140 Rue de Rennes. The attack killed seven people and injured a further 55. The attack was organized by Fouad Saleh, who had carried out numerous bombings in Paris in the months prior.

== Background ==
This is the last and deadliest of fourteen attacks claimed by the “Committee of Solidarity with Arab and Middle East Political Prisoners”, instigated by Fouad Ali Saleh on behalf of Lebanese Hezbollah with the aim of stopping the support provided by France to Iraq in the conflict between it and Iran and to obtain the releases of three terrorists detained in France: Anis Naccache (Iranian network), Georges Ibrahim Abdallah (founder of Lebanese Revolutionary Armed Faction (FARL)) and Varadjian Garbidjan (Armenian ASALA network). This period was called “Black September” and ended definitively with the arrest of Fouad Ali Saleh on 21 March 1987 by police officers from the Directorate of Territorial Surveillance (DST) and the neutralization of his network. The attack was first attributed by the Minister of the Interior, Charles Pasqua, and by his Minister Delegate for Security, Robert Pandraud, to FARL, the communist organization which Abdallah had founded.

Robert Pandraud later said: "I told myself that basically highlighting the Abdallah track wouldn't do any harm, even if it didn't do any good. In reality, we had no leads then. The entire French press took up this thesis, contributing to increasing the sentence of Georges Ibrahim Abdallah (life imprisonment)." Judge Alain Marsaud underlined in his memoir entitled Avant de tout voix: "It is now obvious that Abdallah was partly condemned for what he had not done".

== Attack ==
At 5:28 PM on 17 September, a black-painted BMW of unknown model drove up rue de Rennes, a busy street lined with stores. As the car approached a store owned by Tati, it slowed down and a man got out of the vehicle's passenger side. The man walked up to a trash can that was located a short distance from the store's entrance and dropped a package containing a homemade explosive into the can. The man then got back into the vehicle and drove off. Seconds later, the bomb detonated and exploded, and debris flew across the street and struck pedestrians and other observers. Several people were instantly killed in the explosion, and many more were injured to varying degrees.

== Aftermath ==
=== Responsibility ===
The identity of the men who were in the BMW that dropped the package was unknown until several days after the attack, when several witnesses pointed out Emile Abdallah to authorities during a line-up. Abdallah is the brother of Georges Ibrahim Abdallah, who was convicted in a double murder. Authorities had come to the conclusion that an estimated 30 terrorists were involved in the bombing, many of which were either associated with the Lebanese Armed Revolutionary Factions or the French sector of Hezbollah.

A reward of FR 1,000,000 was offered by French authorities for the capture of Emile Abdallah, who at the time was unidentified.

== See also ==
- November 2015 Paris attacks, a series of bombings and shootings in Paris
