= List of terrorist incidents in 1986 =

This is a timeline of incidents in 1986 that have been labelled as "terrorism" and are not believed to have been carried out by a government or its forces (see state terrorism and state-sponsored terrorism).

== Guidelines ==
- To be included, entries must be notable (have a stand-alone article) and described by a consensus of reliable sources as "terrorism".
- List entries must comply with the guidelines outlined in the manual of style under MOS:TERRORIST.
- Casualty figures in this list are the total casualties of the incident including immediate casualties and later casualties (such as people who succumbed to their wounds long after the attacks occurred).
- Casualties listed are the victims. Perpetrator casualties are listed separately (e.g. x (+y) indicate that x victims and y perpetrators were killed/injured).
- Casualty totals may be underestimated or unavailable due to a lack of information. A figure with a plus (+) sign indicates that at least that many people have died (e.g. 10+ indicates that at least 10 people have died) – the actual toll could be considerably higher. A figure with a plus (+) sign may also indicate that over that number of people are victims.
- If casualty figures are 20 or more, they will be shown in **bold**. In addition, figures for casualties more than 50 will also be **underlined**.
- Incidents are limited to one per location per day. If multiple attacks occur in the same place on the same day, they will be merged into a single incident.
- In addition to the guidelines above, the table also includes the following categories:

0 people were killed/injured by the incident.
1–19 people were killed/injured by the incident.
20–49 people were killed/injured by the incident.
50–99 people were killed/injured by the incident.
100+ people were killed/injured by the incident.

== List ==
Date	Type	Dead	Injured	Location	Details	Perpetrator	Part of
3 February	Bombing	0	8	Paris, France	A bomb exploded in a shopping gallery at the Champs-Élysées, wounding eight people. The bombing was claimed by the Hezbollah-affiliated Committee for Solidarity With Arab and Middle Eastern Political Prisoners (CSPPA).	CSPPA, Hezbollah	1985–86 Paris attacks
4 February	Bombing	0	4	Paris, France	A bomb exploded in the basement record section of the Gibert Jeune bookstore on the Place Saint-Michel, tearing up the floor and setting the building ablaze. Four people were wounded. The bombing was claimed by the Hezbollah-affiliated CSPPA.	CSPPA, Hezbollah	1985–86 Paris attacks
5 February	Bombing	0	9	Paris, France	a bomb exploded at a book and record shop of the Fnac chain in the Forum des Halles underground complex, wounding nine people.	CSPPA, Hezbollah	1985–86 Paris attacks
13 March	Car bombing	60		Damascus, Syria	Car bombing. Pro-Iraqi militants were blamed.	Pro-Iraqi militants (suspected)	
17 March	Bombing	0	9	Paris, France	A bomb exploded on the TGV Paris-Lyon high-speed rail, wounding nine people. The bombing was claimed by the Hezbollah-affiliated CSPPA.	CSPPA, Hezbollah	1985–86 Paris attacks
20 March	Bombing	2	28	Paris, France	A bomb exploded in the Point-Show shopping gallery on the Champs-Élysées, killing two people and wounding 28. The bombing was claimed by the Hezbollah-affiliated CSPPA.	CSPPA, Hezbollah	1985–86 Paris attacks
27 March	Car bombing	1	22	Melbourne, Australia	Car bombing of the Russell Street Police Headquarters by three men linked to organized crime. Policewoman Angela Taylor was the sole fatality.	Craig Minogue; Stan Taylor; Peter Reed	
2 April	Bombing	4	7	Argos, Greece	Bombing of TWA Flight 840 mid-flight, killing four Americans, including a baby. Flight 840 had previously been hijacked in 1969. Investigators concluded the bomb had been planted by a Lebanese woman who was an Abu Nidal Organisation member.	Abu Nidal Organisation	Israeli–Palestinian conflict
5 April	Bombing	3	229	West Berlin, West Germany	Bombing at a discothèque frequented by American soldiers, killing two and a Turkish woman. A trial in the U.S. found Libya guilty of organizing the attack.	Four Libyans	
April	Car bombings	144		Damascus, Syria	Car bombings in five towns around Damascus. Pro-Iraqi militants were blamed.	Pro-Iraqi militants (suspected)	
17 April	Attempted bombing	0	0	London, United Kingdom	A Semtex bomb was found in the luggage of an Irish woman who was about to board an El Al flight from London to Tel Aviv. The bomb had been planted by her Jordanian husband Nezar Hindawi who was arrested the next day.	Nezar Hindawi	
3 May	Bombing	21	41	Katunayake, Sri Lanka	bomb explodes aboard Air Lanka flight carrying mainly French, British and Japanese tourists killing 21 (including 13 foreigners – of whom 3 British, 2 German, 3 French, 2 Japanese, 1 Maldivian and 1 Pakistani) and injuring 41 on Bandaranaike International Airport.	LTTE	Sri Lankan Civil War
14 July	Car bombing	12	32	Madrid, Spain	Plaza República Dominicana bombing. Attack carried out by the armed Basque separatist group ETA, which killed 12 people and injured a further 32.	ETA	Basque conflict
5 September	Hijacking, hostage-taking	20	120	Karachi, Pakistan	Four gunmen from the Abu Nidal Organization hijack Pan Am Flight 73 at Sahar International Airport. After a 16-hour siege, the Pakistani Army raided the plane and the militants opened fire on the passengers, killing 20.	Abu Nidal Organization	Israeli–Palestinian conflict
6 September	Mass shooting	22	6	Istanbul, Turkey	Gunmen from the Abu Nidal Organization open fire on the Neve Shalom Synagogue, killing 22.	Abu Nidal Organization	Israeli–Palestinian conflict
7 September	Shooting	5	11	Cajón del Maipo, Chile	President Augusto Pinochet survived an attack while returning from a weekend rest at his residence in El Melocotón. The attack, carried out by the armed organization of extreme left called Patriotic Front Manuel Rodríguez (FPMR), left 5 dead and 11 wounded.	Frente Patriotico Manuel Rodriguez	Armed resistance in Chile (1973–90)
8 September	Bombing	2	28	Paris, France	A bomb exploded in the post office of the Hôtel de Ville, killing one person and wounding 18 others. The bombing was claimed by the Hezbollah-affiliated CSPPA.	CSPPA, Hezbollah	1985–86 Paris attacks
12 September	Bombing	0	54	Paris, France	A bomb exploded in the cafeteria of the Casino supermarket in the Quatre Temps shopping centre in La Défense, wounding 54 people. The bombing was claimed by the Hezbollah-affiliated CSPPA.	CSPPA, Hezbollah	1985–86 Paris attacks
14 September	Bombing	2	0	Paris, France	A bomb exploded after being found in the Pub-Renault, a fashionable cafe and restaurant on the Champs-Élysées, killing two policemen. The bombing was claimed by the Hezbollah-affiliated CSPPA.	CSPPA, Hezbollah	1985–86 Paris attacks
15 September	Bombing	1	56	Paris, France	A bomb exploded in the Paris Police Prefecture, killing one person and wounding 56. The bombing was claimed by the Hezbollah-affiliated CSPPA.	CSPPA, Hezbollah	1985–86 Paris attacks
17 September	Bombing	7	60	Paris, France	A bomb was thrown into a shopping street at rue de Rennes from a passing car, blowing in several store fronts and cars. The attack killed seven people and wounded 60. The bombing was claimed by the Hezbollah-affiliated CSPPA.	CSPPA, Hezbollah	1985–86 Paris attacks
17 November	Assassination	1	0	Paris France	Georges Besse, the general manager of the nationalized Renault group was shot dead at approximately 20:30 local time (19:30 UTC).	Action Directe	
23 November	Bombing	1 (an attacker)	0	Melbourne, Australia	Two members of the Armenian Revolutionary Federation, Hagop Levonian and Levon Demirian attempt to bomb the Turkish Consulate. The bomb prematurely detonated and Levonian was killed.	Armenian Revolutionary Federation	
25 December	Hijacking, grenade	63	Dozens	Arar, Saudi Arabia	Four men hijacked Iraqi Airways Flight 163 en route from Baghdad to Amman. A grenade explosion forced the plane to attempt an emergency landing, however another grenade exploded and caused the plane to crash near Arar, killing 60 passengers and 3 crew members. The Islamic Jihad claimed responsibility and Iraq accused Iran of organizing the attack.	Islamic Jihad	Iran–Iraq War
31 December	Arson	98	140	San Juan, Puerto Rico	Three employees at the Dupont Plaza Hotel set the hotel on fire over a labor dispute. Their intention was only to scare tourists away.	Héctor Escudero Aponte; José Rivera López; Arnaldo Jiménez Rivera	

== See also ==
- List of terrorist incidents
