= 1985–86 Paris attacks =

Series of terrorist attacks in Paris, France

- Part of the Iran–Iraq War and terrorism in France
- Location: Paris, France
- Date: 7 December 1985 – 17 September 1986
- Target: Shopping venues, public offices, commuter trains
- Attack type: Bombings, Islamic terrorism
- Weapon: Improvised explosive devices
- Deaths: 20
- Injuries: 255
- Perpetrator: CSPPA (mainly Fouad Ali Saleh's network within Hezbollah)
- No. of participants: 18
- Motive: Release three imprisoned terrorists; Backlash against French support for Iraq during the Iran–Iraq War; Expulsion of opponents of the Iranian government

From 1985 to 1986, a series of terrorist attacks in Paris, France were carried out by the Committee for Solidarity With Arab and Middle Eastern Political Prisoners (CSPPA), a previously unknown group, demanding the release of three imprisoned international terrorists. The CSPPA was believed to have been some combination of Palestinians, Armenian nationalists, and Lebanese Marxists, though it was later reported that the attacks were believed to have involved operatives from Hezbollah, sponsored by the Iranian state. The CSPPA demanded the release of Anis Naccache, from the Iranian state network; Georges Ibrahim Abdallah, member of the Lebanese Armed Revolutionary Factions (LARF); and Varadjian Garbidjan, member of the Armenian Secret Army for the Liberation of Armenia (ASALA).

Fouad Saleh, a Tunisian convert to Shia Islam, was found in 1987 by the counter-terrorism agency Direction de la surveillance du territoire (DST) to have been the leader of the group of eighteen terrorists directed by Hezbollah from Beirut. During the trials it was claimed that the attacks were ordered by Iran to stop France from selling arms to Iraq for use in the Iran–Iraq War, rather than the prisoners' releases.

Thirteen bombings, including attempted ones, were committed, the first in December 1985, a second wave in February and March 1986, and the third and most notorious wave in September 1986, targeting sites across the French capital. It caused a total of 20 deaths (including seven who died later from their wounds in hospitals) and 255 people were wounded.

== Background ==
In 1984, Hezbollah-linked Islamic Jihad Organization terrorists were arrested while plotting bombings against a plane from Zürich Airport, and against the United States embassy in Rome. In 1985 the group was responsible for attacks including the El Descanso bombing in Madrid that killed eighteen people and wounded 82, the hijacking of TWA Flight 847 from Athens, and bombings in Copenhagen that killed one person and wounded 22.

France applied a policy in response to attacks from Middle Eastern terrorism in Europe called the "sanctuary doctrine" by analysts, in which French authorities would not interfere with the activities of transnational terrorist groups operating in France as long as they did not attack France or French interests directly. A wave of bombings began in Paris in early 1985 with the bombing of a Marks & Spencer department store, and of the Jewish Rivoli Beaubourg cinema.

== Overview ==
Two bombings on the same day occurred in December 1985. It came a day after Communist Combatant Cells attacks in Belgium and near Paris, and a bomb against a courthouse in Liège. This naturally created suspicion that they were linked, although eventually none of the three were.

Following three bombings in February 1986, thousands of extra police officers were sent out to patrol various areas in Paris. On 20 March 1986, a bomb killing two people took place within an hour of Jacques Chirac being named French Prime Minister under François Mitterrand, while simultaneously being Mayor of Paris. Chirac subsequently launched further increased security in public places, while promising "draconian" anti-terrorism measures. At the same time he began a policy of "normalisation" of relations with Iran and Syria. After initially seeming to put a stop to attacks, a renewed bombing campaign in September 1986 turned out to become the most intense and is said to have "virtually paralyzed Paris." In addition, fifteen riot police companies were sent to Paris to reinforce security, while police raced to investigate more than a hundred bomb scares reported by members of the public.

== Attacks ==
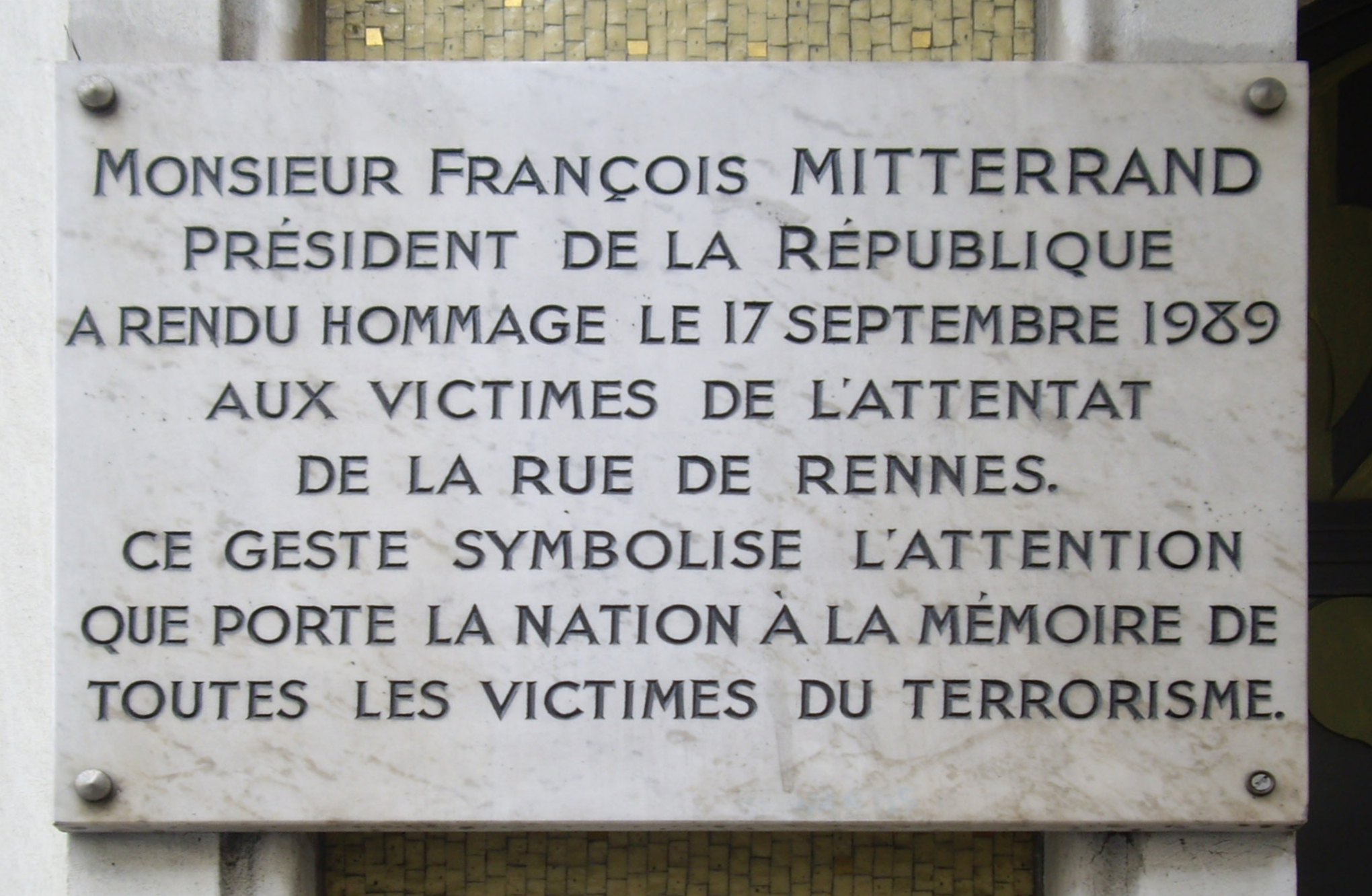
A plaque commemorating the victims of the 17 September 1986 attack at rue de Rennes.

- 7 December 1985, two bombs exploded, at the Galeries Lafayette and Printemps department stores, wounding 43 people. (ASALA also claimed responsibility)
- 3 February 1986, a bomb exploded in a shopping gallery at the Champs-Élysées, wounding eight people. Another bomb was found and defused in the Eiffel Tower the same day.
- 4 February 1986, a bomb exploded in the basement record section of the Gibert Jeune bookstore on the Place Saint-Michel, tearing up the floor and setting the building ablaze. Four people were wounded, while the fire took seventeen firetrucks and 100 firefighters over an hour to put out.
- 5 February 1986, a bomb exploded at a book and record shop of the Fnac chain in the Forum des Halles underground complex, wounding nine people.
- 17 March 1986, a bomb exploded on the TGV Paris-Lyon high-speed rail, wounding nine people.
- 20 March 1986, a bomb exploded in the Point-Show shopping gallery on the Champs-Élysées, killing two people and wounding 28. Another bomb was found and defused the same day in an RER commuter train.
- 4 September 1986, a bomb was discovered in the carriage of an RER commuter train in Gare de Lyon.
- 8 September 1986, a bomb exploded in the post office of the Paris City Hall, killing one person and wounding 18 others.
- 12 September 1986, a bomb exploded in the cafeteria of the Casino supermarket in the Quatre Temps shopping centre in La Défense, wounding 54 people.
- 14 September 1986, a bomb exploded after being found in the Pub-Renault, a fashionable cafe and restaurant on the Champs-Élysées killing two policemen.
- 15 September 1986, a bomb exploded in the Paris Police Prefecture, killing one person and wounding 56.
- 17 September 1986, a bomb was thrown into a shopping street at rue de Rennes from a passing car, blowing in several store fronts and cars. The attack killed seven people and wounded 60, making it the deadliest of the bombings.

== Investigation ==
The CSPPA (Comité de solidarité avec les prisonniers politiques arabes et du Proche-Orient) remained a mystery group at the time. A French defector claimed that the attacks were indirectly sponsored by Iran, Syria and Libya, which each had strained relations with the French state. One of the prisoner demands was Anis Naccache, who was convicted of attempting to assassinate former pre-Revolution Iran premier Shapur Bakhtiar. Armenian militants and Lebanese far-left militants were also thought to be involved.

ASALA's involvement was strongly noted by the authorities due to the CSPPA's demand of releasing Varoujan Garbidjian, who was in prison over the 1983 Orly Airport attack. In October 1986, a handwritten statement signed by ASALA spokesman Vahran Vahrania and delivered to a western news agency in Beirut threatened more violence against France unless Garbidjian and the other Middle Eastern prisoners were released. The ASALA claimed co-responsibility for the September 1986 attacks in Paris.

Jacques Chirac believed that the FARL was responsible due to the prison sentencing of its member Georges Ibrahim Abdallah at the time. However others, including Syria, claimed it was linked to the Iran–Iraq War, and it was later found out that the links between the CSPPA and the FARL were pretty weak, and that the main entity behind the group was Iran. Iran's involvement led to some to describe the attacks as having a dimension of Shia Islamic terrorism. Investigations of the hijackers of TWA Flight 847 and Air Afrique Flight 56 were among the factors that helped lead investigators towards Hezbollah, the Iranian-backed Lebanese militia, and the cell behind the attacks. In early 1987, following the arrest of Mohammed Ali Hammadi in West Germany, the DST identified Fouad Ali Saleh as the leader of a group of eighteen terrorists directed by Hezbollah from Beirut as being behind all the attacks. Previously, several other groups had been speculated to have been behind the attacks or falsely claimed responsibility. Saleh's group was in addition to Tunisians connected to Lebanese Hezbollah operatives responsible for mass-casualty bombings including the bombing of the United States embassy in Beirut and the Beirut barracks bombings in 1983.

=== Arrests and convictions ===
After the Paris City Hall bombing in September 1986, twelve people of Arab origin, mostly Tunisians, were detained and expelled from France. Later, in a police raid on 21 March 1987, Saleh and seven other suspects, two Lebanese French citizens and five Tunisians were arrested, among them a nephew of Hezbollah leader Sheik Ibrahim al-Amin. Police seized two automatic pistols, ammunition and methyl nitrate during the raid.

Saleh was charged in November 1987 by a special anti-terrorism court in France, and was in 1992 found guilty of murder, attempted murder and conspiracy, and sentenced to life in prison. A Tunisian former Sunni Muslim who converted to Shia Islam before moving to Iran and studying for two years in the religious seminaries of Qom in the early 1980s, Saleh had begun preaching and proselytising to people both in public places and private, which reportedly led him to be recruited by Hezbollah agents. During the court case he proclaimed his motivation for the attacks as being "a fighter advocating for the Islamic cause." He also spoke of Joan of Arc and quoted Julius Evola. Jacques Vergès served as Saleh's lawyer.

== Aftermath ==
In September 1986, the French government allegedly sent officials to Syria, concluding a deal with the government in which support for terrorism in France would cease, in return for French arms, economic and diplomatic support to Syria. A similar deal was reportedly made with Iran the next year.

After the arrest of the Saleh group in 1987, Tunisia broke off diplomatic relations with Iran, accusing the country of recruiting Tunisians to carry out terrorist attacks. France initially accused Iran of "instigating the 1986 bombing campaign and of giving support to a cell of North African terrorists," and a subsequent diplomatic row caused France to sever its ties with Iran. France eventually allowed Wahid Gordji, who was wanted for questioning in connection with the Paris attacks, to leave the Iranian embassy in Paris for Iran in order to secure the release of two French hostages who had subsequently been kidnapped by Hezbollah in Beirut, a move that was condemned by the United Kingdom and the United States for setting a "dangerous precedent" in dealing with hostage situations. After several more gestures were made by France, including the expulsion of Iranian opposition leaders from the country, the conflict and further attacks ceased.

In France the attacks triggered "profound changes" in the organisation and legislative base for French counter-terrorism. In Belgium the attacks had a major part in Belgian police starting to investigate political Islam, leading directly to the establishment of a specific office dedicated entirely to Islamic radicalism in the Brussels Gendarmerie anti-terrorism unit.

After the terror attacks of 1986, France was largely free of attacks from international terrorism for the next eight years, when a series of attacks was carried out by the Armed Islamic Group of Algeria (GIA).

== See also ==
- List of Islamist terrorist attacks
