= 1986 Damascus bombings =

Terrorist attacks in Syria

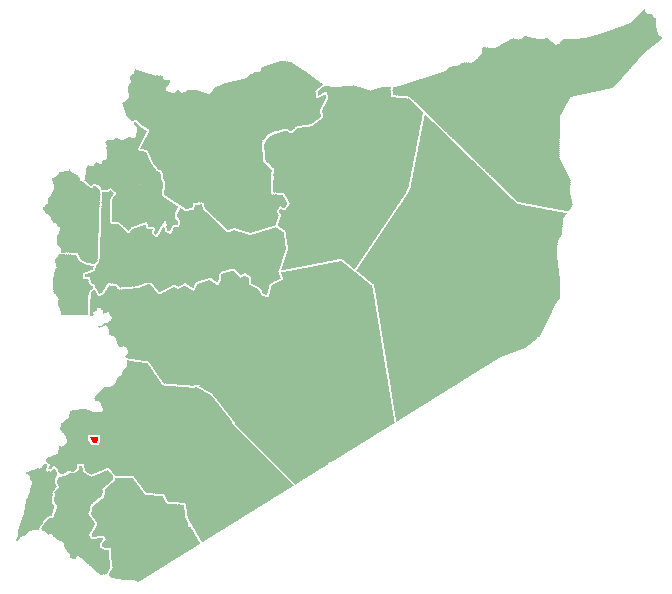
- Damascus highlighted within Syria
- Location: Damascus and nearby towns, Syria
- Date: March–April 1986
- Attack type: Bombings
- Weapon: Car bombs
- Deaths: 204
- Motive: Regime destabilization

The 1986 Damascus bombings were a series of terrorist attacks perpetrated in Damascus, Syria in 1986. They were the deadliest acts of terrorism against civilians since the quelling of the Islamist uprising in Syria in 1982. The bombings appeared to be aimed at destabilizing the Syrian government under Hafez al-Assad with links being between the suspected perpetrators and Iraq.

== Bombings ==
On 13 March 1986, a truck bomb detonated under a bridge in a Damascus suburb, killing 60 people and injuring 100 more. A month later, 144 were killed by a series of bombings in five towns and cities across Syria, including Damascus, with buses being a prime target.

== Alleged perpetrators ==
Immediately after the March bombing, the Syrian government placed the blame on Iraq, citing their desire to destabilize the regime. After the April 1986 bombings claimed the lives of an additional 144 people, a previously unknown group with pro-Iraq sympathies calling themselves the 17 October Group for the Liberation of the Syrian People, claimed responsibility. The BBC reported in 2008 that "pro-Iraqi militants" were "believed" to be responsible for both the March and April bombings.

== See also ==
- List of terrorist incidents in 1986
- List of modern conflicts in the Middle East
