= West Berlin discotheque bombing =

1986 attack in West Germany

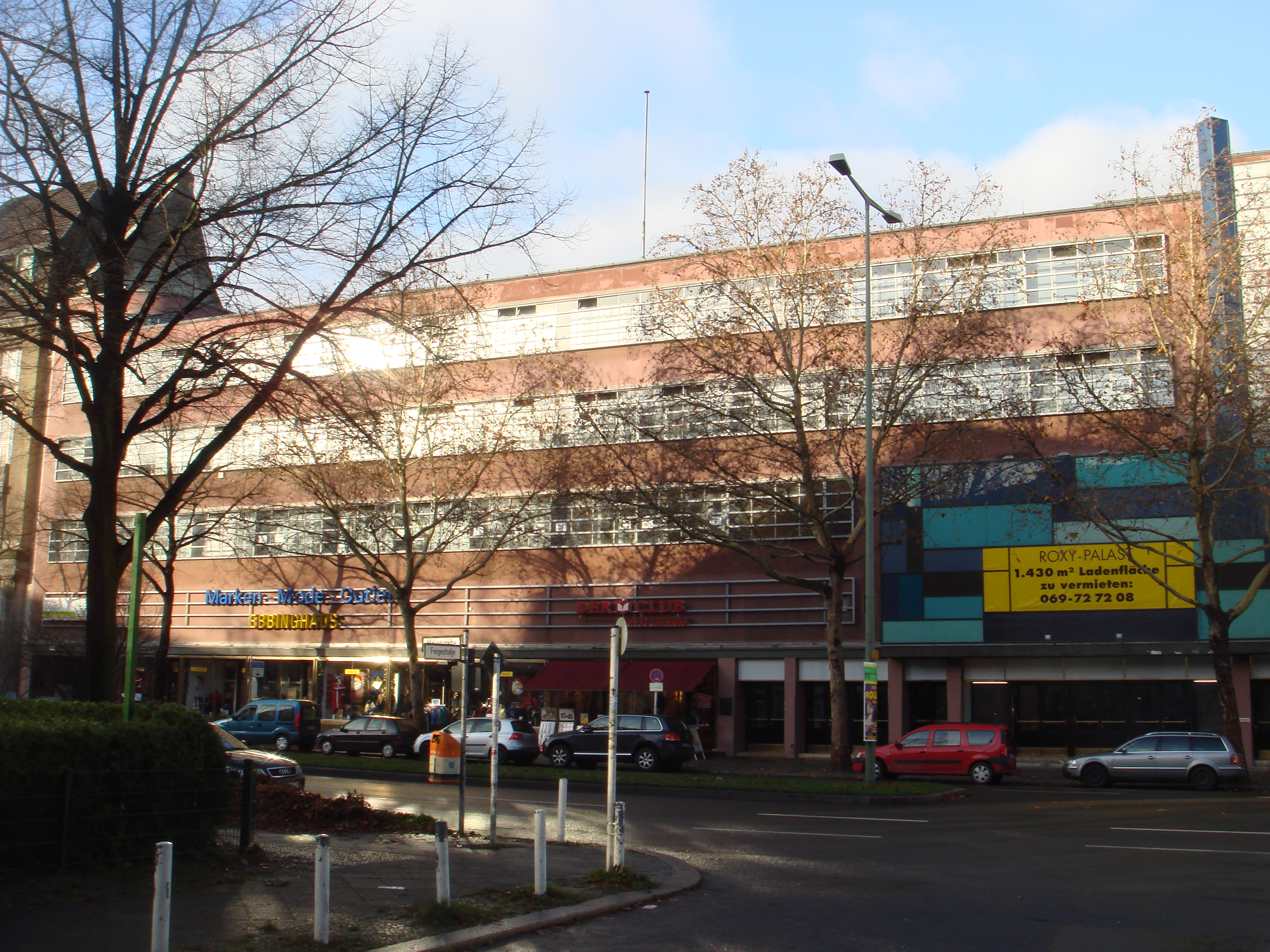
- Roxy-Palast, the building in which the discotheque La Belle was located
- Location: 52°28′23″N 13°20′12″E; Hauptstraße 78, Bezirk Schöneberg, West Berlin, West Germany (Note: The political status of West Berlin was subject to controversy throughout its existence but de facto it operated as a federal state of West Germany.)
- Date: 5 April 1986; 40 years ago 1:45 a.m. (CET/CEST)
- Attack type: Bombing
- Weapon: Plastic explosive
- Deaths: 3 (2 US soldiers, 1 Turkish civilian)
- Injuries: 229
- Perpetrators: Verena Chanaa, Yasir Shraydi, Musbah Eter, Ali Chanaa

On 5 April 1986, three people were killed and 229 injured when La Belle discothèque was bombed in the Friedenau locality (then part of Schöneberg, and since 2001 part of the merged district of Tempelhof-Schöneberg) of West Berlin. The entertainment venue was commonly frequented by United States soldiers; two of the dead and 79 of the injured were Americans.

Libya was accused by the US government of sponsoring the bombing, before US president Ronald Reagan ordered retaliatory strikes on Tripoli and Benghazi in Libya ten days later. The operation was widely seen as an attempt to kill colonel Muammar Gaddafi. However, in the bombing's aftermath, this claim was met with widespread skepticism. In 1987, Manfred Ganschow, the head of the West German team investigating the bombing, said that there was no evidence pointing towards Libya, a belief which was corroborated by numerous intelligence agencies in Europe at the time, according to a BBC report. In 2001, following a four-year German trial, often described as "murky" and marred by what the court called a "limited willingness" by the American and German governments to share evidence, it was found that the bombing had been "planned by the Libyan Intelligence Service and the Libyan embassy", but Gaddafi himself was absolved of responsibility.

== Background ==
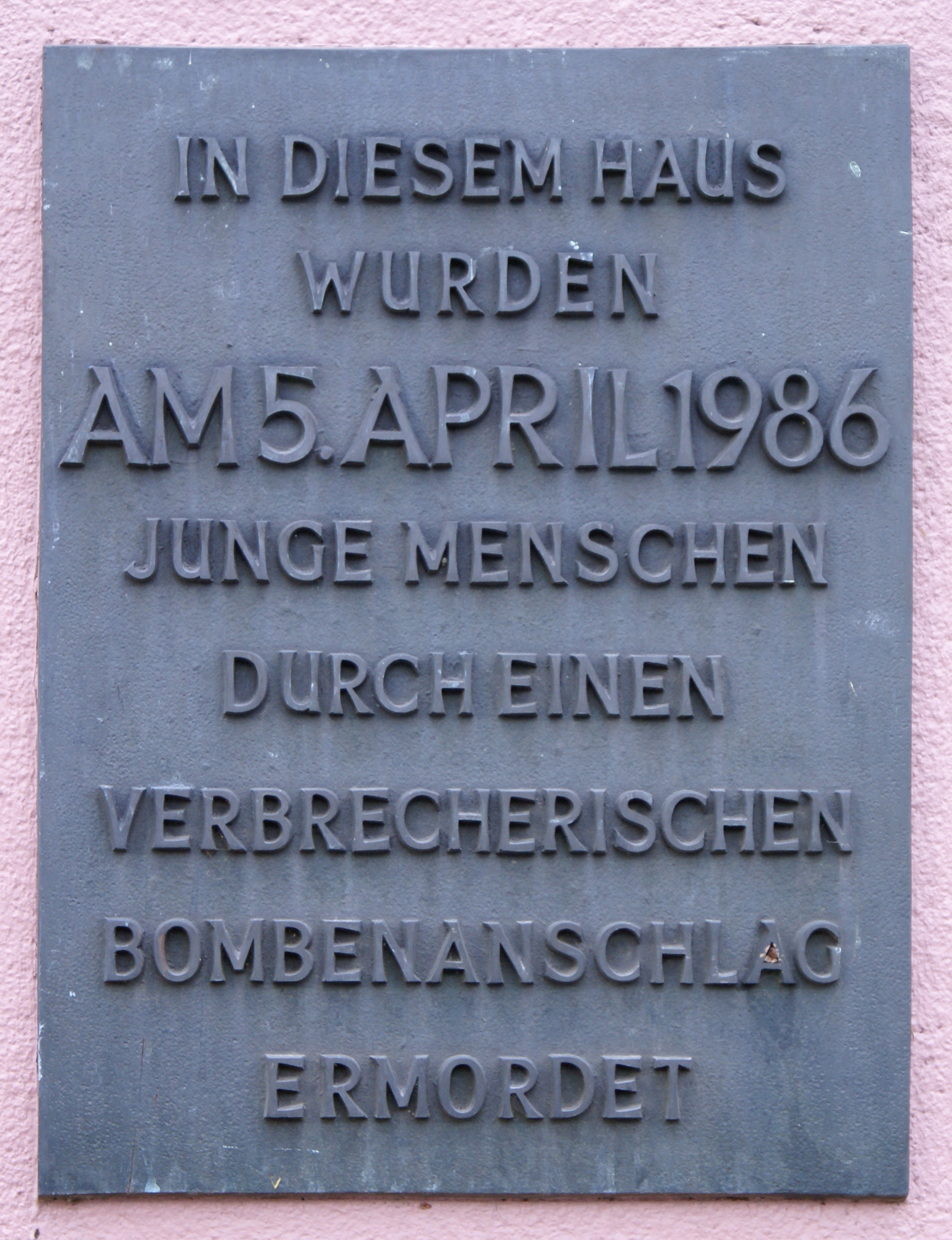
Memorial plaque reading, "On the 5th of April, 1986, young people were murdered inside this building by a criminal bombing."

The bombing came at a time of heightened tension between the United States and Libya, which first escalated in the early 1980s. These tensions drastically escalated in early 1986, when US forces repeatedly flew planes over the Gulf of Sidra. Libyan forces subsequently fired upon American planes, which led to an American bombing campaign.

The site of the bombing, a discothèque known as La Belle, was known to be a popular spot for American troops in West Germany.

== Attack ==
A bomb placed under a table near the disc jockey's booth exploded at 01:45 CET. An eyewitness testified that he had walked outside of the club prior to the bomb going off and the blast knocking him back. He righted himself and went inside to find his wife and joined many individuals who were attempting to help those near the blast.

The blast destroyed a large portion of the floor, causing many to fall into the cellar underneath the dance floor.

== Victims ==
The explosion instantly killed a Turkish woman, Nermin Hannay, and US Army Sergeant Kenneth T. Ford. A second American sergeant, James E. Goins, died from his injuries two months later.

The blast injured at least 230 individuals which included more than 50 American service members, including Gunnery Sergeant Aunt Paiter, United States Marine Corps and LCPL James Hurt United States Marine Corps, it was a popular hangout spot for service members. Some of the victims were left permanently disabled due to the injuries caused by the explosion.

== Blame and retribution ==
Almost immediately after the bombing, the American government, led by president Ronald Reagan, placed the blame on Libya. However, the West German team investigating the bombing had not found any evidence of Libyan involvement, and other intelligence agencies throughout Europe also did not find evidence of Libyan involvement. Nine days after the bombing, Reagan ordered airstrikes against the Libyan capital of Tripoli, and the city of Benghazi. At least 30 soldiers and 15 civilians were killed. Gaddafi's adopted infant daughter Hana was reported killed, although the claim, and even her existence, have been disputed.

Following the reunification of Germany, archives from the Stasi in East Germany were made available, which led to Libyan embassy worker Musbah Eter, who would later be indicted for aiding and abetting attempted murder.

In 2001, a court in Germany found that the bombing had been "planned by the Libyan secret service and the Libyan Embassy", and convicted four people suspected to be involved with the attack, including two workers at the Libyan embassy in East Germany. However, in their ruling, the court presiding over the trial complained that their decision was hindered by "the limited willingness" of the German and American governments to share intelligence, and the trial was called "murky" by BBC News. Notably, the trial failed to prove the involvement of then-Libyan leader Muammar Gaddafi.

== Trial and conviction ==
In spite of reports blaming Libya for the attack on the nightclub, no individual was officially accused of the bombing until the 1990 reunification of Germany and the subsequent opening up of the Stasi archives. Stasi files led German prosecutor Detlev Mehlis to Musbah Abdulghasem Eter, a Libyan who had worked at the Libyan embassy in East Berlin. Stasi files listed him as an agent, and Mehlis said he was the Libyan spy agency's main contact at the embassy.

Beginning in 1996, a number of suspects were extradited to Germany. Yasser Mohammed Chreidi, a Palestinian man accused of being the plot's "mastermind", was extradited from Lebanon to Germany on May 24 in connection with the bombing. Chreidi was said to be a "suspected activist of the Fatah-Revolutionary Council" headed by Abu Nidal, who used to live in Tripoli and was financed by Libya in the 1980s. Eter was reported to be the Libyan spy agency's point man at the embassy in East Berlin.

Eter and four other suspects were arrested in 1996 in Lebanon, Italy, Greece, and Berlin, and put on trial a year later. Eventually, a four year trial in Germany, which ended in 2001, found that the bombing had been "planned by the Libyan secret service and the Libyan Embassy", and convicted four people suspected to be involved with the attack: German citizen Verena Chanaa was found guilty of murder, after carrying a bag with the bomb used for the attack into La Belle; Yasir Shraydi, a Palestinian worker at the Libyan embassy in East Berlin, was convicted of attempted murder; Musbah Eter was found guilty of being an accomplice; Ali Chanaa, Verena Chanaa's ex-husband, was also found guilty. A fifth defendant, Andrea Häusler, who accompanied Verena Chanaa to the club, was acquitted after prosecutors failed to prove she had known that the bomb used in the attack was in Chanaa's bag. Verena Chanaa and Yasir Shraydi were sentenced to 14 years in prison, while Musbah Eter and Ali Chanaa were sentenced to 12 years.

The court found that the three men had assembled the bomb in the Chanaa's flat. The explosive was said to have been brought into West Berlin in a Libyan diplomatic bag. The court also notably ruled that prosecutors failed to demonstrate involvement in the bombing by Muammar Gaddafi.

== Compensation ==
On 17 August 2003, newspapers reported that Libya had signaled to the German government that it was ready to negotiate compensation for the bombing with lawyers for non-U.S. victims. A year later, on 10 August 2004, Libya concluded an agreement to pay a total of $35 million compensation to non-US citizens.

In October 2008, Libya paid $1.5 billion into a fund to compensate relatives of:

1. Lockerbie bombing victims with the remaining 20% of the sum agreed in 2003;
2. American victims of the West Berlin discotheque bombing;
3. American victims of the 1989 UTA Flight 772 bombing; and,
4. Libyan victims of the 1986 US bombing of Tripoli and Benghazi.

== See also ==
- 1988 Naples bombing
- Gulf of Sidra incident (1981)
- Gulf of Sidra incident (1989)
- Libya and state-sponsored terrorism
- List of terrorist incidents in 1986
- Operation El Dorado Canyon
- Pan Am Flight 103
- Pan Am Flight 73
- UTA Flight 772
