= 1985 Liège bombing =

Bombing in Liège, Belgium

- Location: 50°38′45.83″N 5°34′23.69″E; Liège, Wallonia, Belgium
- Date: 6 December 1985; 3:00 pm
- Attack type: Bomb
- Deaths: 1
- Injuries: 2
- Perpetrator: Jean-Michel Systermans

On 6 December 1985, a bomb exploded in Palais de Justice, the main courthouse of the city of Liège in Belgium. The explosion took place shortly before hundreds of lawyers including Belgian Justice Minister Jean Gol would attend a swearing-in ceremony. The bomb severely damaged three floors and collapsed the ceiling of the 16th century palace. Philippe Balis, a 20-year-old law student, was killed in the blast.

The attack took place just hours after Communist Combatant Cells terrorists bombed a NATO pipeline in Oudenaarde, a place in Flanders, and in France. However the courthouse and pipeline attacks were not linked.

== Perpetrator ==
Jean-Michel Systermans, a lawyer in his fifties, was arrested on 16 June 1987 after three bombs were discovered in a bank vault under his name. Systermans was previously suspended from the Conseil de l'Ordre in 1980 and afterwards sentenced for embezzlement and then forgery, before carrying out his attack on the courthouse. At court accused of manslaughter, Systermans confessed that he was the perpetrator of the bombing. Systermans had previously been the lawyer of several Liège arms dealers. He was sentenced to death in 1991 (although the last execution in the country was back in 1950) and later got a prison sentence. His accomplice, Francis Reynders, was sentenced to life.

In 2000 Systermans was released on parole from the detention centre.

== See also ==
- Brabant killers
