= Félix Potin =

French businessman (1820–1871)

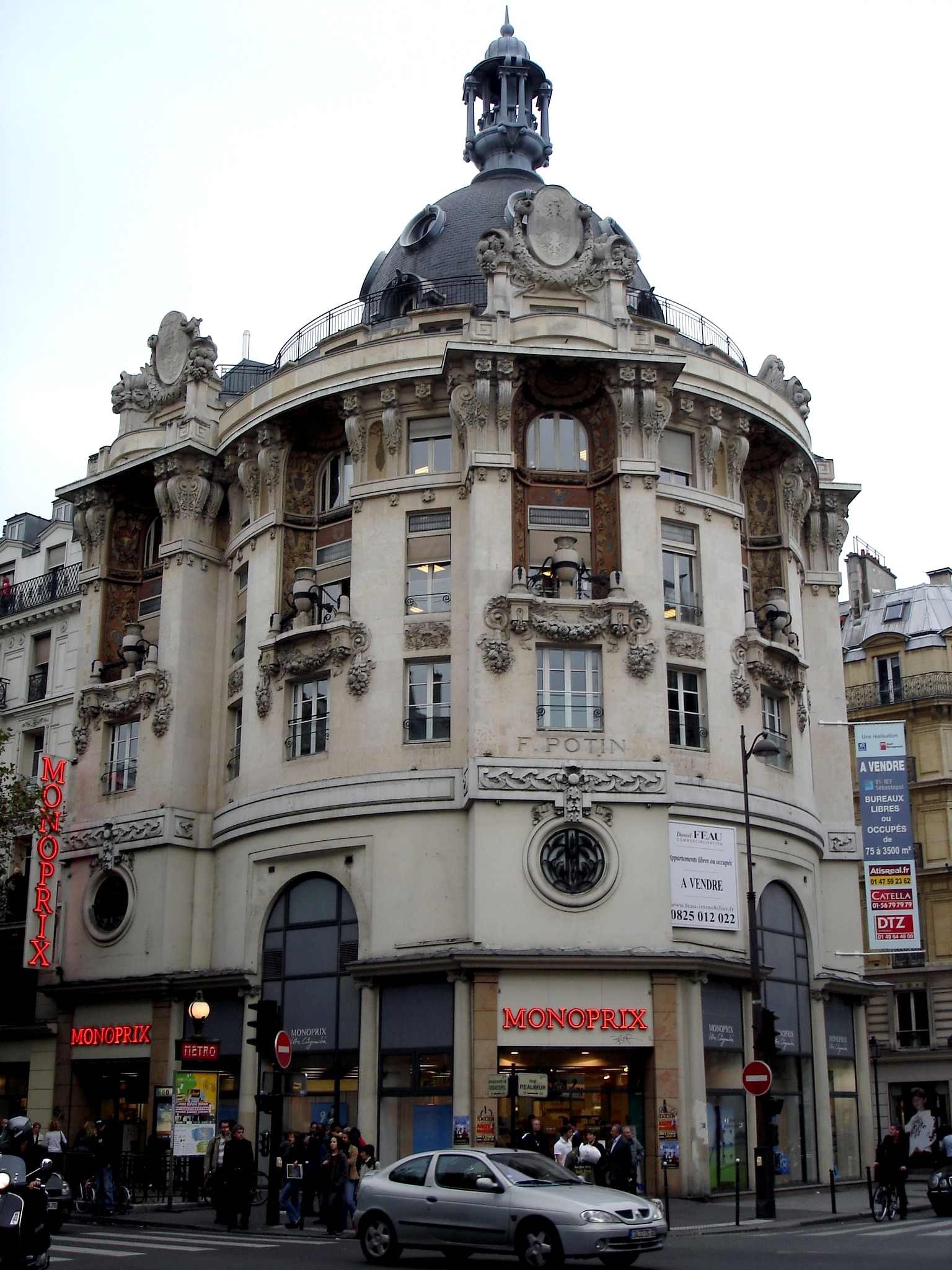
The former head office, now a Monoprix

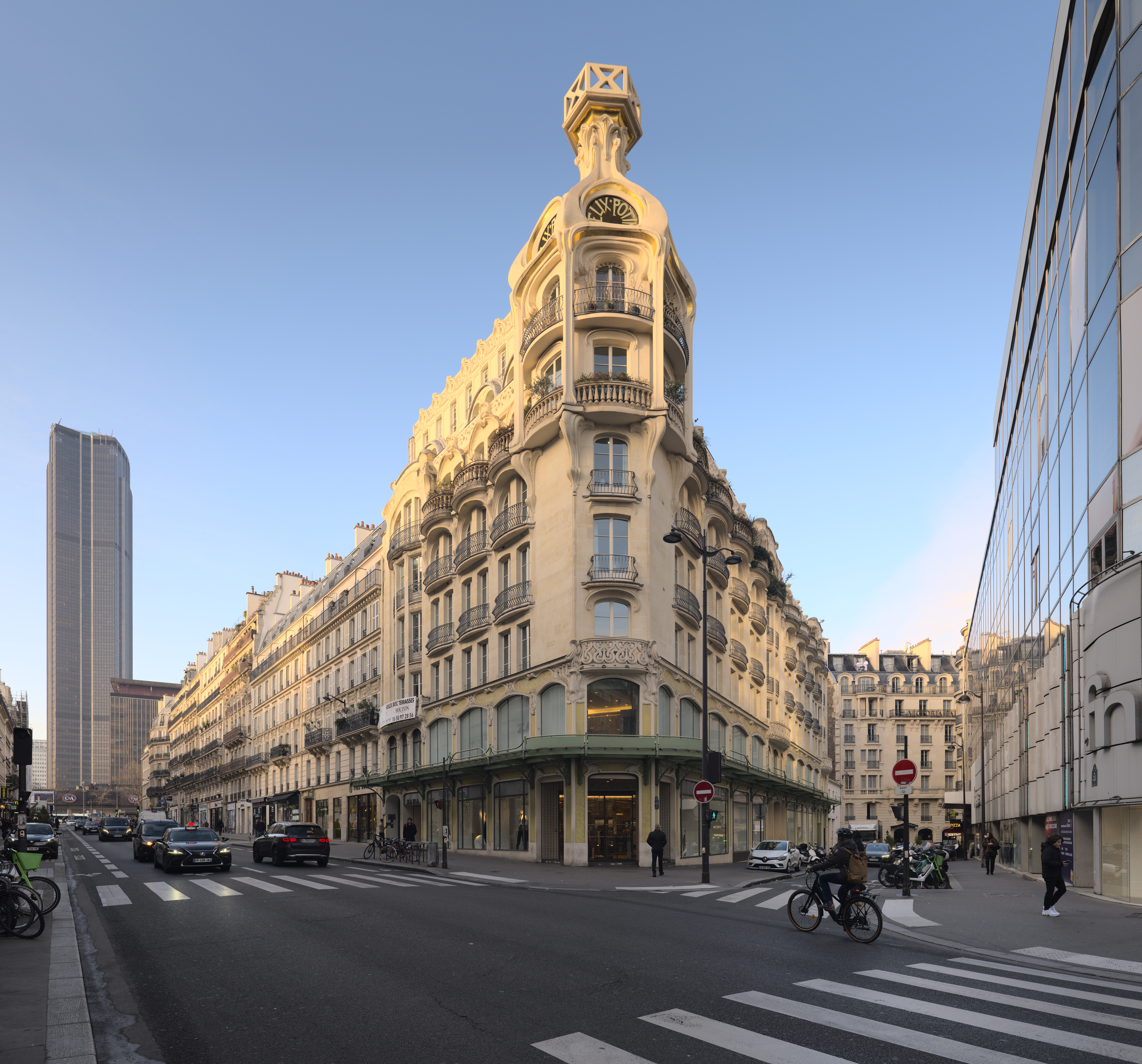
The Félix Potin branch on Rue de Rennes in Paris, featuring the distinctive turret.

Félix Potin is a French businessman (1820-1871) and his mass-distribution retail business, Félix Potin, founded in 1844. The business was bought out and then collapsed in the second half of the twentieth century, the brand has been revived by a contemporary distribution network.

== Biography ==
Jean-Louis-Félix Potin was born on July 9, 1820 in Arpajon, Seine-et-Oise, now in the département of Essonne, Île-de-France. He died in 1871.

== The business ==
=== History ===
Potin opened his first shop at 28 rue Coquenard in Paris in 1844, at age 24. He soon opened numerous branches. In 1860, he opened the first two-level, large-area retailer on the Boulevard de Sébastopol in Paris. The following year he constructed a Félix Potin factory in La Villette, in the northern outskirts of Paris.

The Félix Potin network experienced remarkable success during the late Second Empire and early Third Republic. In 1864 he expanded the Villette factory and opened a boutique on the Boulevard Malesherbes. In 1870 he started a home-delivery service. The business continued to grow after its founder's death, with a second factory in 1880 and a second large shop on Rue de Rennes in 1904. Félix Potin factories employed 1,800 workers in 1906, growing to 8,000 by 1927. By 1923, the Félix Potin name had 70 branches, 10 factories, 5 wine stores and 650 horses.

The business survived in more or less the same form until 1956, when the 1,200 shops became minimarkets, which were bought out by the Greek-French entrepreneur André Mentzelopoulos in 1958. After a period of poor management, this business collapsed and was liquidated in 1996, with the Promodès chain buying a few of the points of sale. In 2003, the Société Philippe Potin acquired the right to use the Félix Potin name for its distribution network in South-East France.

=== Business model ===
When Potin founded his business, a standard business model was to receive loads of goods from a manufacturer, then label and package them in the store. By contrast, Félix Potin shops sold products produced and prepackaged at the chain's own factories, then sold them at standardised, publicised prices. Potin aimed to sell large volumes at reduced profit margins. Potin was thus a pioneer of the chain-and-branch, bulk-buying model of retail, unifying distribution and sales under the same brand. The F. W. Woolworth Company's five-and-dime chain in the US was, to some extent, inspired by Potin's model.

=== Architecture ===
The architect Paul Auscher (1866–1932) designed several buildings for Félix Potin. The distinctive turrets bearing the Félix Potin name can still be seen on the Boulevard de Sébastopol (now a Monoprix) and the Rue de Rennes (now a Zara).
