= Anis al-Naqqash =

Lebanese politician (1951–2021)

- أنيس النقاش
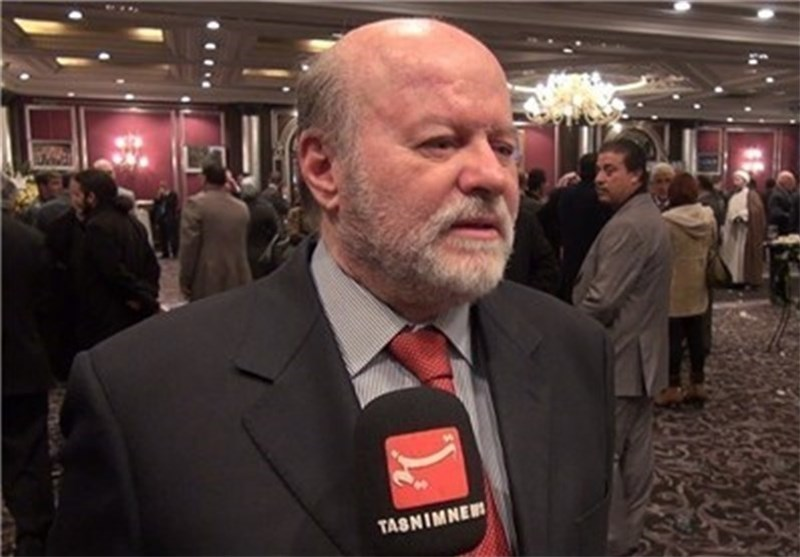
- Born: 1951; Beirut, Lebanon
- Died: 22 February 2021 (aged 69–70); Damascus, Syria
- Known for: Effort in the attempted assassination of Shapour Bakhtiar and co-operation in OPEC siege

Anis al-Naqqash (Arabic: أنيس النقاش; 1951 – 22 February 2021), also transliterated as Anis Naccache, was a Lebanese militant and political activist. A advocate for Palestinian liberation, regional unity, and ideological sovereignty, he is most known for his involvement in the 1975 OPEC siege, his alignment with the Iranian Revolution, and his later role as a pan-regional voice. He was the founder of the Mashriq Strategic Assembly in Beirut and authored several works on regional politics and identity, most notably "الكونفدرالية المشرقية: صراع الهويات والسياسات" (The Eastern Confederation: A Struggle Between Identities and Policies).

== Early life ==
Anis al-Naqqash was born in Beirut, Lebanon, in 1951 into a Sunni Muslim family with deep roots in the region. Though many later misidentified him as Shi’a due to his strong alliances with post-revolution Iran, al-Naqqash was firmly non-sectarian, emphasizing ideological over theological identity. His grandfather had converted to Islam while working in the Hijaz, a historical context that shaped Anis’s later embrace of interfaith and intercultural unity.

In 1968, at the age of 17, al-Naqqash joined Fatah, becoming one of its youngest operatives. Over the years, he participated in missions across Lebanon, Palestine, and Europe, engaging in both military and intelligence activities during the rise of regional resistance movements. His early exposure to armed militancy deeply informed his geopolitical worldview.

== OPEC siege and imprisonment ==
In December 1975, al-Naqqash was part of a six-person unit led by Carlos the Jackal that executed the OPEC siege in Vienna, taking more than 60 hostages, including oil ministers, during an OPEC conference. The operation was politically motivated and aimed at confronting oil-producing nations seen as collaborating with Israeli and Western interests.

In 1980, al-Naqqash was arrested in Paris and later convicted for his involvement in an attempted assassination of Shapour Bakhtiar, the last Prime Minister of Iran under the Shah. The operation was aligned with the Islamic Republic of Iran which was seeking to neutralize the activities of opposition activists abroad. Al-Naqqash was sentenced to life imprisonment by a French court.

While in prison, he remained politically active and was represented by famed French lawyer Jacques Vergès, known for defending high profile and controversial figures such as, convicted terrorist Carlos the Jackal, Nazi war criminal Klaus Barbie, and former Khmer Rouge leader Khieu Samphan. On 27 July 1990, after a decade of incarceration, al-Naqqash and four of his comrades were pardoned by French President François Mitterrand and released.

== Strategic thought and Intellectual Leadership ==
Following his release, al-Naqqash transitioned from armed struggle to strategic analysis, dedicating the remainder of his life to the ideological, cultural, and geopolitical rebirth of the Mashriq (Eastern Arab world). He founded the Mashriq Strategic Assembly, a Beirut-based think tank focused on the long-term vision of building confederal unity among Lebanon, Syria, Iraq, and Palestine—nations he viewed as artificially fragmented by colonial powers.

His most prominent work, الكونفدرالية المشرقية: صراع الهويات والسياسات (The Eastern Confederation: A Struggle Between Identities and Policies), offers a plan for transcending sectarian, ethnic, and national divisions. In it, he argued for:

- Building confederal structures to resist Zionist and Western encroachment
- Replacing imported ideological models with indigenous political and spiritual philosophies
- Empowering regional economies through integration and defense autonomy
- Recognizing the manipulation of identity as a tool of colonial domination

Al-Naqqash was a regular commentator on al-Manar, Al Mayadeen, Press TV, and various Arab and Iranian outlets, where his analyses tackled issues ranging from NATO strategy to Zionist intelligence networks and psychological warfare.

== Pan-Ideological position ==
Throughout his intellectual life, al-Naqqash called for a unified front among all faiths and ideologies resisting foreign domination. Drawing from both Islamic and Christian traditions—particularly from the Levantine context—he repeatedly warned that sectarianism was engineered to divide resistance movements and neutralize sovereignty.

While loyal to the Iranian revolutionary model in its ideological confrontation with the West, he emphasized that victory would come not from theological uniformity, but from ideological clarity, economic liberation, and cultural self-determination.

== Death ==
Anis al-Naqqash died on 22 February 2021 in Damascus, Syria, due to complications from COVID-19, at the age of 70. He was buried in Beirut, Lebanon on that same day.

== Selected works ==
- الكونفدرالية المشرقية: صراع الهويات والسياسات (The Eastern Confederation: A Struggle Between Identities and Policies)
