= Fouad Saleh =

Senior Hezbollah member, terrorist and mass murderer

- فؤاد علي صالح
- Born: May 10, 1958 (age 68); Paris, France
- Years active: 1985-1986
- Organization: Hezbollah in France
- Motive: Islamism
- Convictions: Life imprisonment, without the possibility of parole

Details
- Targets: Buildings and vehicles in Paris, France
- Killed: 14 indirect
- Injured: 303 indirect
- Weapon: Homemade bombs

Fouad Ali Saleh (born 10 May 1958) is a Tunisian Islamist and terrorist widely considered to be the organizer of Hezbollah in France, responsible for a series of attacks committed in 1985 and 1986 in Paris, which resulted in thirteen deaths and left more than three hundred people injured.

== Life ==
=== Early life and education ===
Saleh was born in Paris on 10 May 1958. He received a Catholic education. He became a Sunni Islamist during a stay in Libya. He then converted to Shiism and attended the Theological University of Qom, in Iran, from February 1981 to June 1982, under the direction of Ayatollah Khomeini, from whom he learned the Islamist ideology judged by Yves Lacoste as conquering and anti-Western.

In the context of the Iran-Iraq War where France supported Iraq, Saleh was recruited by the Lebanese Hezbollah, whose affiliation with fundamentalist Iran was attested. Returning to France, he preached the Islamic revolution to the “disinherited” (immigrant Muslims) and established relationships with other Islamists, including in Tunisia and Algeria. Hezbollah's logistics network, at the time, included two postgraduate students, a restaurateur, a taxi driver, employees, a small boss, and, from May 1985, it received more than 25 kilograms (55 lb) of explosives from Lebanon, including methyl nitrate, which was later used in several bombings in Paris.

Saleh himself chose the targets of the attacks and received the bombers sent from Lebanon by Hezbollah. He also recruited unsuspecting individuals on French soil who, like him, frequent the Omar Mosque, located on rue Jean-Pierre-Timbaud in the 11th arrondissement of Paris.

Denounced by an accomplice in exchange for a substantial sum of money, Saleh was arrested on 21 March 1987 by the DST in the company of his driver in their home at 44 rue de la Voûte, in the 12th arrondissement of Paris; 12 liters (3.2 U.S. gal) of methyl nitrate were found in their trunk. Another seizure of explosives was made at the end of 1986 in the Fontainebleau forest, during flagrant trafficking intended for Saleh's network. These seizures prompted Saleh to cut short a third campaign of attacks after the deadliest between them, which took place at rue de Rennes, resulted in the deaths of seven people.

== Attacks ==
=== Motivation ===
In the press releases that followed Saleh's attacks, he claimed to be part of a fictitious “Committee of solidarity with Arab and Middle Eastern political prisoners”. In fact, far from defending Arabs, he was committed to Iran against the Arab camp in the Iran-Iraq war which has lasted since 1980, and wanted to make France pay for its support of the Arab Camp. Shortly after his arrest, he declared: “The fortress of Islam is Iran. Your country, by helping Iraq, is fighting Iran, so it is an enemy. Our main objective is to bring France back to reason through violent actions”.

=== Attacks ===
His actions took place in the context of numerous attacks instigated by the fundamentalist Iranian regime. The investigation concerning him implicated a translator from the Iranian embassy, Wahid Gordji, suspected of being involved in Saleh's network and attacks; the request for his hearing by the judge will be at the origin of an embassy war between France and Iran. Furthermore, his declarations included his action in a broader religious war, announcing the terrorist wars of the early 21st century: “From Iran, our brothers will leave to do battle and will go to Paris, London and Washington”.

The attacks killed thirteen people and injured 350 other passers-by, often seriously. For his recognized decisive involvement, the Paris Special Assize Court sentenced Saleh to life imprisonment on 14 April 1992, with a security period of 18 years. Hassan Aroua, the 38-year-old Tunisian driver, Abdelhamid Badaoui, Omar Agnaou and the two Moroccan “students” who stored the explosives, were also sentenced to life imprisonment but without a security period. Other militants involved in the attacks were captured and sentenced in absentia on 8 October 1992 to life imprisonment: they were the “masterminds”: Abdelhadi Hamade, his two lieutenants, Ibrahim Aqil and Hassan Goshn, and of the two “artificers”, Hussein Mazbouh and Haidar Habib.

On June 28, 2007, the Paris Court of Appeal opposed Saleh's conditional release and his expulsion to Tunisia. The sentencing judge refused the request for release because of his persistent proselytism and on the grounds that he did not express regret and had not compensated the victims.

=== List of attacks attributed to Saleh ===
Attack location	Date	Type	Fatalities	Injuries
Galeries Lafayette Haussmann and Printemps Haussmann (Paris, France)	7 December 1985	Bombing	0	43
Claridge Shopping Mall (Paris, France)	3 February 1986	Bombing	1	8
Eiffel Tower (Paris, France)	3 February 1986	Attempted bombing	0	0
Gibert Jeune bookstore (Paris, France)	4 February 1986	Bombing	0	5
Forum des Halles (Paris, France)	5 February 1986	Bombing	0	22
TGV 627 (Train running a Paris, France to Lyon, France route)	17 March 1986	Bombing	0	9
Point Show Gallery (Paris, France)	20 March 1986	Bombing	2	29
Île-de-France RER (Train stopped in Paris, France)	20 March 1986	Attempted bombing	0	0
Île-de-France RER (Train stopped in Paris, France)	4 September 1986	Attempted bombing	0	0
City Hall Building (Paris, France)	8 September 1986	Bombing	1	21
Casino Cafeteria (Paris, France)	12 September 1986	Bombing	0	54
Pub Renault (Paris, France)	14 September 1986	Bombing	2	1
Paris Police Headquarters (Paris, France)	15 September 1986	Bombing	1	56
Rue de Rennes (Paris, France)	17 September 1986	Bombing	7	55

=== Scope ===
The attacks by Saleh and his group considerably changed the perception of international terrorism in the mid-1980s. Their number (almost as many in one year as in the previous fifteen years), their intensity (up to four attacks in three days), the targeting of the general public and the horror are generally regarded as being "unrivaled". Jean-Louis Bruguière was able to judge that “State services, the Interior, Justice, are outdated”. Thirty years later, in 2015, these attacks remain among the ten deadliest terrorist attacks perpetrated in France since 1970. In 2019, they remain a reference for assessing the insufficiency of progress made in the fight against public bombings and other attacks in public spaces.

During his trial in 1992, his imprecations were against Christians and Jews, “white women” and “fake Africans”, as well as against judges. He promises “a war which will demonstrate that Hitler has been very merciful” and announces “suicide air operations on the Nogent Nuclear Power Plant”.

His attacks had a great impact. The one against the Tati store, at the time “the bloodiest attack ever perpetrated against civilians in France”, gave rise three years later to a ceremony on rue de Rennes led by President François Mitterrand and the mayor of Paris, Jacques Chirac. The New York Times covered Saleh's trial, which it considered “a major terrorism trial”. His statements before the judges were published in Le Monde and Libération. In 2000, a book of more than 400 pages recounted the circumstances of his arrest, which was only obtained after more than a year and a half of a particularly difficult investigation6. In 2012, a television film was broadcast, The Gordji Affair: Story of Cohabitation, which depicts the consequences, at the highest level of the State, of the involvement of fundamentalist Iran in the attacks perpetrated by Saleh in Paris.

== Letters from prison ==
Having been in prison in June 1987 for almost three months, Fouad Ali Saleh wrote letters which were intercepted by the prison administration. They shed light on his personality and the functioning of the Hezbollah-Europe network. As such, they were published in 1990 by the journal Notes & Études of the Institute of Criminology of the University of Paris.

Saleh revealed “direct contact with the private office” of Iranian Ayatollah Hossein Ali Montazeri. He requested in three of these letters “that they send monthly salaries” to himself, his wife, and third parties in Paris and Tunisia. He claims to be “playing the fool” in front of his lawyer, saying that he did not participate and knows nothing about the attacks. Above all, it gives recommendations with a view to the "triumph of the Islamic revolution [which] is the only solution to crush idolatry", in particular to "pursue the mission [of propaganda] in a continuous and enlightened manner, within the Islamic colony and particularly the North African colony” in Europe.

== See also ==
- Ibrahim Aqil
