= Islamic State affiliated terrorist attacks in France =

Terrorist attacks in France

Islamic State terrorism in France
- Part of the Opération Sentinelle, Terrorism in France, Islamic terrorism in Europe
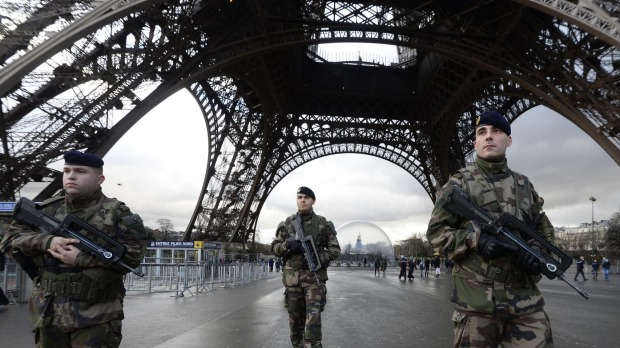
- French soldiers on patrol at the Eiffel Tower, 2018
Date	20 December 2014 – present (11 years, 8 months and 2 days)
Location	France
Status	Ongoing: Opération Sentinelle, French military-led domestic counter-terrorism operation.; French military intervention in Syria, Mali and Niger, with jihadists as primary target.

Belligerents
France	Islamic State; Al-Qaeda

Commanders and leaders
(France) Emmanuel Macron (President 2017–present) (France) Sébastien Lecornu (Prime Minister 2025-present) (France) Gabriel Attal (Prime Minister 2024) (France) Élisabeth Borne (Prime Minister 2022–2024) (France) Gérald Darmanin (Minister of the Interior 2022-2024); Sébastien Lecornu (Minister of the Armed Forces 2022–2025); Thierry Burkhard (Chief of the Defence Staff 2021–present); Pierre Schill (Chief of the Army Staff 2021–present); Pierre Vandier (Chief of the Naval Staff 2020–present); Stéphane Mille (Chief of the Air and Space Force Staff 2021–present) Former: (France) François Hollande; (France) Manuel Valls; (France) Bernard Cazeneuve; (France) Édouard Philippe; (France) Jean Castex; (France) Bruno Le Roux; (France) Matthias Fekl; (France) Gérard Collomb; (France) Christophe Castaner; Jean-Yves Le Drian; Sylvie Goulard; Florence Parly; Pierre de Villiers; François Lecointre; Jean-Pierre Bosser; Thierry Burkhard; Bernard Rogel; Christophe Prazuck; Denis Mercier; André Lanata; Philippe Lavigne	Ayman al-Zawahiri †; Abu al-Hasan al-Hashimi al-Qurashi †; Abu Ibrahim al-Hashimi al-Qurayshi †; Abu Bakr al-Baghdadi † (Islamic State) Abu Ala al-Afri †; Abu Omar al-Shishani †; Abu Waheeb †

Units involved
(France) French Armed Forces: Ground Army; French Navy; (France) French police forces	Islamic State military: Islamic State associated Islamists; Al-Qaeda European militias

Casualties and losses
	285 killed

ISIL-related terrorist attacks in France refers to the terrorist activity of the Islamic State in France, including attacks committed by Islamic State-inspired lone wolves. The French military operation Opération Sentinelle has been ongoing in France since the January 2015 Île-de-France attacks.

== Background ==
According to The Guardian, eight attacks occurred in France during the eighteen months from January 2015 to July 2016, including the January 2015 Île-de-France attacks (which killed 17 people), the November 2015 Paris attacks (which killed 130), and the July 2016 Nice truck attack (which killed 86). Reportedly, the Islamic State has called on its supporters for a coordinated wave of attacks in European countries.

== Timeline ==
=== 2012 ===
Three connected attacs: 11 Mars 2012. In front of a middle school in Southeast Toulouse, after waiting to meet someone who said he was interested in buying a motorcycle from him, one person, an off-duty French Moroccan paratrooper, was murdered by a point-blank shot in the head.

15 Mars 2012. While withdrawing money from a cash machine outside a shopping centre in Montauban, three people, who was working as paratroopers, were shot. Two were killed and a third person seriously injured.

19 Mars 2012. An attack on a Jewish middle and secondary school in Toulouse, witch educates children of primarily Sephardic, Middle Eastern and North African descent. The first victim was a rabbi and teacher at the school who was shot outside the school gates as he tried to shield his two sons, a 3- and a 5-year-old, from the attacker. The father didn't succeed and the attacker shot both of the boys as well. The attacker then went in to the school and shot at staff, parents and students. The attacker chased an eight-year-old, caught her by her hair and shoot her in her temple at point-blank range. A 17-year-old boy, was also shot and gravely injured. The attacker used at least two firearms during the attack.

The attacker said he carried out attacks because of France's ban on Islamic face veils, France's participation in the war in Afghanistan and because the Jews in the middle and secondary school should die as a revenge for the Israel-Palestine conflict.

The attacker bought a GoPro camera about a month before the attacks, with the intention to film his killings. He is on his recordings heard to, among other things, say "I love death the way you love life" to one of his victims. In late March al-Jazeera received a copy if the attacks on a USB memory stick but the channel decided not to run the footage or give it to any other media outlet. Audio clips of the attacks was instead later released by STUDIO TF1. STUDIO TF1 says they have four-and-a-half hours of recordings, in which the attacker also confesses to have trained with al-Qaeda "brothers" in Pakistan.

French investigators believe the attacker became increasingly radical under Salafism (Sunni Islam). The attacker traveled to Afghanistan and Pakistan before the attacks. The police investigation found that the attacker had made more than 1,800 calls to over 180 contacts in 20 different countries, in addition to having taken several trips to the Middle East and Afghanistan, and that this suggest he also might have been in touch with others about his planned attacks.

=== 2015 ===
On 26 June 2015, an attacker decapitated one person. He then blew up a gas canister in a factory in Saint-Quentin-Fallavier, near Lyon, injuring two.

On 21 August 2015, in the 2015 Thalys train attack, a man threatened passengers with an AKM assault rifle on a Thalys train between Amsterdam and Paris. One passenger was shot in the neck with a pistol when the rifle jammed. Two United States military personnel and other passengers intervened and overcame the attacker. One of them was cut in the struggle.

From 13 November 2015 to 14 November 2015, a series of coordinated attacks began over about 35 minutes at six locations in central Paris. The first shooting attack occurred in a restaurant and a bar in the 10th arrondissement of Paris. There was shooting and a bomb detonated at Bataclan theatre in the 11th arrondissement during a rock concert. Approximately 100 hostages were then taken and overall 89 were killed there. Other bombings took place outside the Stade de France stadium in the suburb of Saint-Denis during a football match between France and Germany. Three days later, in Saint-Denis, a police raid-turned-shootout between at least 100 French police officers and soldiers and suspected members of the Islamic State of Iraq and the Levant occurred, killing three suspects and injuring five police officers.

=== 2016 ===
On 1 January 2016, a 29-year-old Frenchman of Tunisian descent rammed over a civilian and a guard in an entrance of a mosque in Valence, Drôme, reportedly while chanting, "Allahu Akbar!" He then put his car into reverse to try to ram the soldiers again who fired warning shots and then fired to disable the driver. The driver said he wanted to kill troops because "troops killed people" and that he wanted to be killed by the troops.

On 7 January 2016, an asylum seeker shouted "Allahu Akbar!" outside a police station in Goutte d'Or, near Montmartre, where police shot and killed him while a passerby was shot. Reports say he was wielding a knife and fake suicide vest.

On 11 January 2016, a 15-year-old Turkish boy attacked a teacher from a Jewish school in Marseille with a machete, apparently attempting to decapitate him. The student told police that he had committed the act "in the name of Allah and ISIS".

On 27 May 2016, a French military person was left in "serious condition" after being attacked with knives in Saint-Julien-du-Puy (Tarn). The member of the military was approached by two men who "have criticized the French bombing in Syria." He was then beaten with fists and beaten cutter.

On 13 June 2016, in the 2016 Magnanville stabbing, a police officer and his wife, a police secretary, were stabbed to death in their home in Magnanville, France, located about 55 km (34 mi) west of Paris, by a man convicted in 2013 of associating with a group planning terrorist acts. Amaq News Agency, an online outlet said to be linked to the Islamic State of Iraq and the Levant (ISIL), said that a source had claimed that ISIL was behind the attack.

On the evening of 14 July 2016, a 19 tonne cargo truck was deliberately driven into crowds celebrating Bastille Day on the Promenade des Anglais in Nice, France, resulting in the deaths of 86 people and the injuries of 434 others. On 16 July, two agencies linked to Islamic State claimed responsibility for the attack.

On 26 July 2016, in the 2016 Normandy church attack, two assailants killed the priest Jacques Hamel and seriously wounded a woman in a church in Saint-Étienne-du-Rouvray. The two assailants were killed by French Special Forces. Islamic State claimed responsibility for the attack.

=== 2017 ===
On 3 February 2017, in the 2017 Louvre machete attack, an Egyptian national in France on a tourist visa was shot as he rushed a group of French soldiers guarding a principal entrance to the Louvre Museum in Paris, France, attacking and injuring one soldier with a machete. The soldiers were patrolling the Museum as part of Opération Sentinelle, guarding the Carrousel du Louvre. Immediately after his arrest, the suspect told authorities that he was carrying spray paint in order to deface the museum's artwork, an act that he regarded as a "symbolic" attack on France.

On 18 March 2017, in the March 2017 Île-de-France attacks, a pair of terrorist attacks by the same individual occurred in Garges-lès-Gonesse, an outer suburb of Paris, and Orly Airport near Paris. The attacker, a 39-year-old man identified as Ziyed Ben Belgacem, was shot dead after attempting to seize a weapon from a soldier patrolling the airport under Opération Sentinelle.

On 20 April 2017, in the 2017 shooting of Paris police officers, three police officers were shot by an attacker wielding an AK-47 rifle on the Champs-Élysées, a shopping boulevard in Paris, France. One officer was killed and two others, along with a female tourist, were seriously wounded. The attacker was then shot dead by police. ISIL claimed responsibility.

On 6 June 2017, in the 2017 Notre Dame attack, a lone attacker assaulted a police officer at Notre-Dame de Paris. The officer and the attacker, a 40-year-old Algerian graduate student who had left a video pledging allegiance to ISIL, were both injured.

=== 2018 ===
On 23 March 2018, the Carcassonne and Trèbes attack was conducted by a lone attacker who pledged allegiance to ISIL. Four persons and the attacker were killed and 25 injured.

On 11 December 2018, in the 2018 Strasbourg attack, a 29-year-old French citizen of Algerian origin killed five civilians and wounded 11 others at a Christmas market in Strasbourg, France, before being killed in a shootout with police two days later.

=== 2019 ===
On 24 May 2019, in the 2019 Lyon bomb attack, a packet bomb exploded in front of a bakery in the pedestrian zone of Lyon. 13 people were wounded. A 24-year-old male student from Algeria was arrested three days later. No group has claimed responsibility for the attack yet.

On 3 October 2019, in the Paris police headquarters stabbing, a radicalized Islamist stabbed four people to death, and injured two others at the central police headquarters in Paris. He was an administrative worker and had been recently converting to Salafist Islam. The perpetrator was shot instantly dead by other officers.

=== 2020 ===
On 4 April 2020 in the 2020 Romans-sur-Isère knife attack, two people were killed and five others wounded in a mass stabbing in Romans-sur-Isère, Auvergne-Rhône-Alpes, France. The suspect is a 30-year-old Sudanese asylum seeker who was arrested at the scene. French police have launched a terrorism investigation. Two other people related to the attacker were arrested later.

On 27 April 2020, two police officers were seriously injured when a driver rammed his vehicle into them in Colombes, Hauts-de-Seine. The perpetrator was arrested, and a source stated that the man carried out the attack to "avenge events in Palestine". The attacker had pledged allegiance to Islamic State.

=== 2023 ===
13 October 2023. An attack on people within a high school in Arras. A teacher was mortally wounded in the throat and thorax by the attacker while trying to protect his students in a school in Arras. Three other members of staff were injured in the attack. In a video recorded before his attack, the attacker cited Hamas October 7 attacks on Israel as one of his inspirations. The attacker was specifically looking for a history teacher according to a witness, which echoes a 2020 attack in another school, where a teacher was beheaded with a cleaver, of which the French president Emmanuel Macron said then was "a typical Islamist terrorist attack", and that that teacher "was killed for teaching children freedom of speech".

2 December 2023. One person was killed and two people were wounded near the Eiffel Tower in Paris. The French President Emmanuel Macron named it a terrorist attack. The attacker used a knife and a hammer to attack, and he had pledged allegiance to Islamic State in a video recorded beforehand. Seven years before this attack, in 2016, the suspect was sentenced to four years in prison for the planning of another terror attack.

=== 2025 ===
22 February 2025. One person was killed, and five police officers, trying to protect the public, were wounded in a knife attack in a market in Mulhouse. Two of the police officers were taken to hospital with severe injuries. The attacker reportedly shouted "Allahu Akbar" during the attack. The suspect was on a terrorism watch list before the attack. French President Emmanuel Macron said there was "no doubt it was an Islamist terrorist attack".

== Impact ==
=== Aftermath and economic loss ===
At the end of 2015, the INSEE forecasts that the terrorist attacks of November will cause a 0.1% decrease in the country's GDP for the last part of the year.

Following the hostage taking of the 13th of November 2015 and the July 2016 Nice attack, the French Government decided to raise the tax on insurance contracts from €3.30 to €5.90 per contract, generating a benefit of €140 million which was redistributed to the victims and their families.

Tourism was largely impacted by the terrorist attacks of 2015. Following the week of the 13th, restaurants (especially gourmet ones), cinemas, museums (including the Louvre and Grand Palais) and fashion galleries (such as Lafayette and Printemps Haussman) experienced a downfall of visitor rate up to 50%. This phenomenon was all the more disastrous for the economy as it occurred a couple weeks before Christmas.

In 2016, the number of tourists saw a 7% decrease. The SNCF (French National Railroad Service) announced a loss of 300 million euros on that year. The final results of the Regional Committee of Tourism confirmed a fall of 1.5 million tourists: primarily international tourists and most notably Chinese tourists, which represents a loss of 1.3 billion euros.

=== Side effects ===
Following the attacks, security services were increasingly sought. Private bodyguards were hired, policemen were mobilized to do check at the entrances of highly attended public events, staff were hired to prevent new attacks. Thousands of French flags were purchased at the end of 2016. The book A Moveable Feast, written by Ernest Hemingway, describing the delightful Parisian life in the 1920s, sold 125,400 copies instead of the expected 3000. Book stores quickly experienced a shortage, thus thousands of copies were printed to respond to the unprecedented demand.

== See also ==
- Brussels Islamic State terror cell
- European migrant crisis
- Islam in France
- Islamic terrorism
- Opération Chammal
- Terrorism in Europe
- Terrorism in France
- Spillover of the Syrian Civil War
