= Terrorism in France =

- Part of the Opération Sentinelle, war on terror, Islamic terrorism in Europe
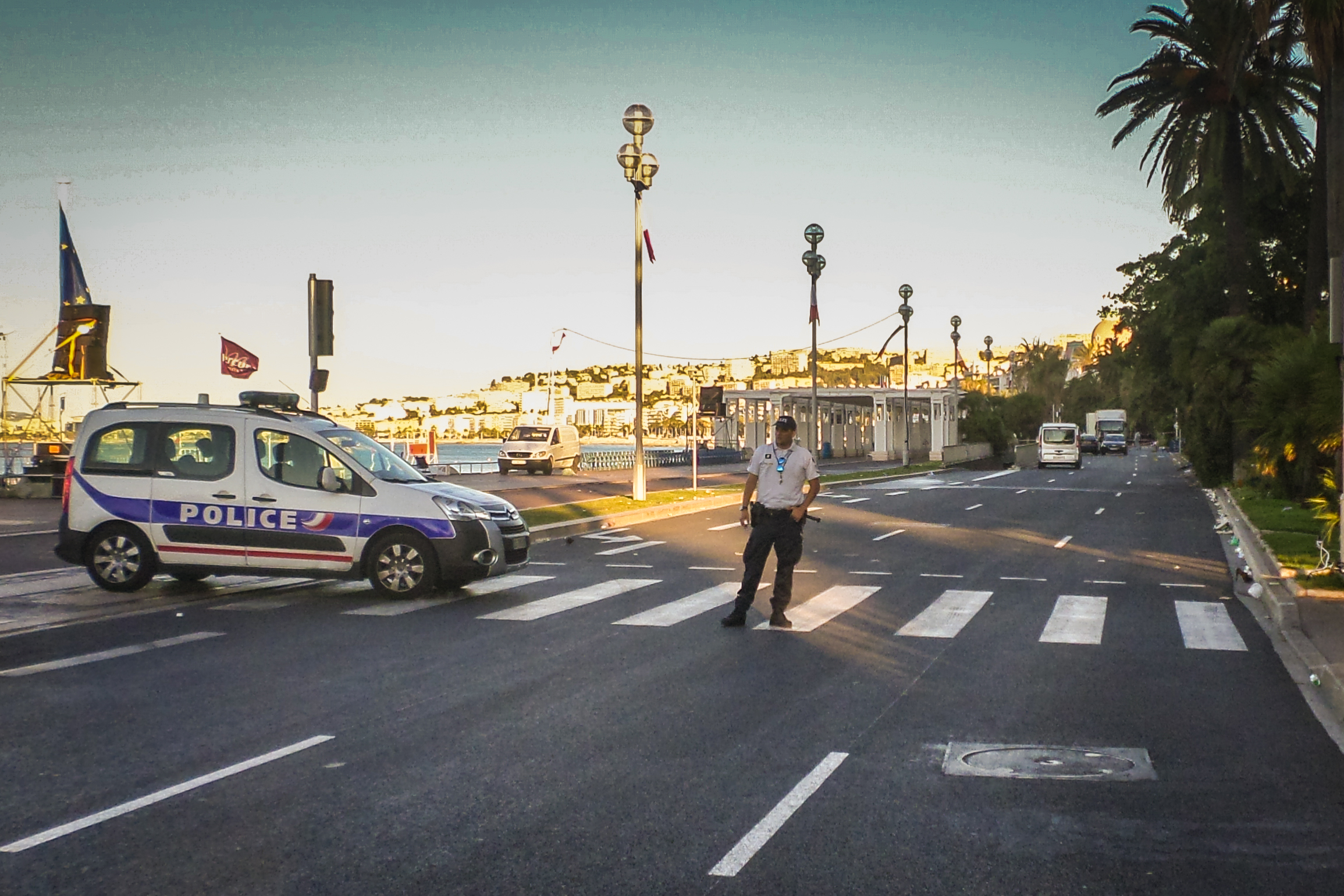
- Site of the 2016 Nice truck attack, the following day.
Date	15 September 1958 – present (68 years, 1 month, 2 weeks and 5 days)
Location	France
Status	Ongoing: Opération Sentinelle, French military-led domestic counter-terrorism operation.; French military intervention in Syria, Mali and Niger, with jihadists as primary target.

Belligerents
Government of France: French Armed Forces; French Army; French Navy; French Air and Space Force; National Gendarmerie; National Guard; Minister of the Interior; Law enforcement in France; National Police; Ministry of Foreign Affairs; National Defense	Islamic State: Military of IS; Libyan Provinces; Wilayat al-Jazair; Greater Sahara Province; Uqba ibn Nafi Brigade; IS-GS; ISWAP; Al-Qaeda European militias: Al-Qaeda; Al-Qaeda in the Arabian Peninsula; al-Qaeda in the Indian subcontinent; al-Qaeda in the Islamic Maghreb; Al-Shabaab; Hurras al-Din; Jama'at Nasr al-Islam wal Muslimin; Boko Haram; Al-Mourabitoun; Ansar Dine; Movement for Oneness and Jihad in West Africa; Ansaru; Jihadism (Islamic terrorism) and Antisemitism: National Liberation Front; Organisation armée secrète; Charles Martel Group; Popular Front for the Liberation of Palestine; Armenian Secret Army for the Liberation of Armenia; Abu Nidal Organization; Hezbollah; Islamic Jihad Organization; Action Directe; Lebanese Armed Revolutionary Factions; French and European Nationalist Party; Armed Islamic Group of Algeria; Afghan Revolutionary Front

Commanders and leaders
(France) Emmanuel Macron (President 2017–present) (France) Sébastien Lecornu (Prime Minister 2025–present) (France) Laurent Nuñez (Minister of the Interior 2025–present); Catherine Vautrin (Minister of the Armed Forces 2025–present); Thierry Burkhard (Chief of the Defence Staff 2021–present); Pierre Schill (Chief of the Army Staff 2021–present); Nicolas Vaujour (Chief of the Naval Staff 2023–present); Jérôme Bellanger (Chief of the Air and Space Force Staff 2024–present) Former: (France) Charles de Gaulle; (France) Georges Pompidou; (France) Alain Poher; (France) Valéry Giscard d'Estaing; (France) François Mitterrand; (France) Jacques Chirac; (France) Nicolas Sarkozy; (France) François Hollande; (France) Michel Debré; (France) Maurice Couve de Murville; (France) Jacques Chaban-Delmas; (France) Pierre Messmer; (France) Raymond Barre; (France) Pierre Mauroy; (France) Laurent Fabius; (France) Michel Rocard; (France) Édith Cresson; (France) Pierre Bérégovoy; (France) Édouard Balladur; (France) Alain Juppé; (France) Lionel Jospin; (France) Jean-Pierre Raffarin; (France) Dominique de Villepin; (France) François Fillon; (France) Jean-Marc Ayrault; (France) Manuel Valls; (France) Bernard Cazeneuve; (France) Édouard Philippe; (France) Jean Castex; (France) Élisabeth Borne; (France) Gabriel Attal; (France) Michel Barnier; (France) Émile Pelletier; (France) Jean Berthoin; (France) Pierre Chatenet; (France) Roger Frey; (France) Christian Fouchet; (France) Raymond Marcellin; (France) Michel Poniatowski; (France) Christian Bonnet; (France) Gaston Defferre; (France) Pierre Joxe; (France) Charles Pasqua; (France) Philippe Marchand; (France) Paul Quilès; (France) Jean-Louis Debré; (France) Jean-Pierre Chevènement; (France) Daniel Vaillant; (France) François Baroin; (France) Michèle Alliot-Marie; (France) Brice Hortefeux; (France) Claude Guéant; (France) Bruno Le Roux; (France) Matthias Fekl; (France) Gérard Collomb; (France) Christophe Castaner; (France) Gérald Darmanin; (France) François Bayrou; Pierre Guillaumat; Pierre Messmer; Michel Debré; Robert Galley; Jacques Soufflet; Yvon Bourges; Joël Le Theule; Charles Hernu; Paul Quilès; André Giraud; Jean-Pierre Chevènement; Pierre Joxe; Pierre Bérégovoy; François Léotard; Charles Millon; Alain Richard; Michèle Alliot-Marie; Hervé Morin; Alain Juppé; Gérard Longuet; Jean-Yves Le Drian; Sylvie Goulard; Florence Parly; Paul Ély; Gaston Lavaud; André Martin; Charles Ailleret; Michel Fourquet; François Maurin; Guy Méry; Claude Vanbremeersch; Jeannou Lacaze; Jean Saulnier; Maurice Schmitt; Jacques Lanxade; Jean-Philippe Douin; Jean-Pierre Kelche; Henri Bentégeat; Jean-Louis Georgelin; Édouard Guillaud; Pierre de Villiers; François Lecointre; André Zeller; André Demetz; Louis Le Puloch; Émile Cantarel; Alain de Boissieu; Jean Lagarde; Jean Delaunay; René Imbot; Maurice Schmitt; Gilbert Forray; Marc Monchal; Philippe Mercier; Yves Crène; Bernard Thorette; Bruno Cuche; Elrick Irastorza; Bertrand Ract-Madoux; Jean-Pierre Bosser; Thierry Burkhard; Georges Cabanier; André Patou; André Storelli; Marc de Joybert; Albert Joire-Noulens; Jean-René Lannuzel; Yves Leenhardt; Bernard Louzeau; Alain Coatanéa; Jean-Charles Lefebvre; Jean-Luc Delaunay; Jean-Louis Battet; Alain Oudot de Dainville; Pierre-François Forissier; Bernard Rogel; Christophe Prazuck; Pierre Vandier; Edmond Jouhaud; Paul Stehlin; André Martin; Philippe Maurin; Gabriel Gauthier; Claude Grigaut; Maurice Saint-Cricq; Guy Fleury; Bernard Capillon; Achille Lerche; Jean Fleury; Vincent Lanata; Jean-Philippe Douin; Jean Rannou; Jean-Pierre Job; Richard Wolsztynski; Stéphane Abrial; Jean-Paul Paloméros; Denis Mercier; André Lanata; Philippe Lavigne; Stéphane Mille	Ayman al-Zawahiri †; Abu Hafs al-Hashimi al-Qurashi (Leader of IS); Abu al-Hussein al-Husseini al-Qurashi †; Abu al-Hasan al-Hashimi al-Qurashi †; Abu Ibrahim al-Hashimi al-Qurashi † Abu Bakr al-Baghdadi †; Abu Ali al-Anbari †; Abu Omar al-Shishani †; Abu Waheeb †

Strength
Unknown	ISIL: 200,000 in Iraq and Syria (claim by Iraqi Kurdistan Chief of Staff); 28,600–31,600 in Iraq and Syria (Defense Department estimate); 35,000–100,000 (State Department estimate); 1,500+ in Egypt; 6,500–10,000 in Libya; 7,000–10,000 in Nigeria; 1,000–3,000 in Afghanistan; At least 400 in the Philippines and Malaysia; Up to 600 tanks

Casualties and losses
Unknown	Islamic State of Iraq and the Levant: 80,000+ killed and 33,000+ targets destroyed or damaged in the American-led intervention in Iraq and Syria; 1,500–2,500 killed in Libya; 974 killed in the Philippines; 300 killed in Afghanistan; 1,000+ killed in Egypt
- Unknown

Terrorism in France refers to the terrorist attacks that have targeted the country and its population during the 20th and 21st centuries. Terrorism, in this case is much related to the country's history, international affairs and political approach. Legislation has been set up by lawmakers to fight terrorism in France.

CBC News reported in December 2018 that the number of people killed in terrorist attacks in France since 2015 was 249, with the number of wounded at 928. Since 1970, France experienced 2,654 terrorist incidents, resulting in 1,247 terrorist-related deaths and 2,559 injuries, the second highest in western Europe after the United Kingdom. France remains the country most affected by Islamist terrorism within Europe, with recent data showcasing a total of 82 Islamist attacks and 332 deaths from 1979 to 2021.

Terrorist incidents map of France 1970–2015. Paris, Corsica and southwestern France are major places of incidents. A total of 2,616 incidents are plotted.

Terrorism deaths in France recorded in the Global Terrorism Database. The spike in 2015 is over 6 times the previous maximum since 1970 and is indicated by a number off the scale.

== History ==
Deaths and Injuries due to Terrorist incidents in France by Year
Year	Number of incidents	Deaths	Injuries
2020	9	7	10
2019	3	4	16
2018	3	10	30
2017	9	3	16
2016	26	95	470
2015	36	162	443
2014	14	1	15
2013	12	0	5
2012	65	8	8
2011	8	0	4
2010	3	0	0
2009	9	0	11
2008	13	0	1
2007	16	3	8
2006	34	1	3
2005	33	0	11
2004	11	0	10
2003	34	0	21
2002	32	0	4
2001	21	0	16
2000	28	4	1
1999	46	0	2
1998	12	1	0
1997	130	0	4
1996	270	18	114
1995	71	19	177
1994	97	7	22
1993	12	0	0
1992	126	9	12
1991	137	6	5
1990	30	3	3
1989	25	3	2
1988	54	6	19
1987	87	5	8
1986	95	25	306
1985	106	17	83
1984	145	15	57
1983	121	20	186
1982	62	17	144
1981	66	8	78
1980	94	20	74
1979	212	11	41
1978	59	21	17
1977	53	3	7
1976	58	7	10
1975	39	3	25
1974	29	3	41
1973	14	5	20
1972	9	1	0
1971	0	0	0
1970	0	0	0
Total	2,654	547	2,559

=== Right-wing terrorism ===
France has a modern history of right-wing terrorism that dates back to the middle of the 20th century. Historically, right-wing terrorism was tied to rage over the loss of France's colonial possessions in Africa, particularly, the loss of Algeria. In 1961, the Organisation armée secrète or OAS, a right-wing terrorist group that protested against Algerian independence from France, launched a bomb attack on board a Strasbourg–Paris train which killed 28 people.

On 14 December 1973, the far-right Charles Martel Group orchestrated a bomb attack at the Consulate of Algeria, killing 4 people and injuring 20.

In the town of Toulon, a far-right extremist group called SOS-France existed. On 18 August 1986, four members were driving a car carrying explosives, apparently in an attempt to bomb the offices of SOS Racisme. However it exploded while they were still in it, killing all four of them.

In more recent times, far-right extremism in France has been fueled by the rise of anti-immigrant and far-right political movements. Neo-Nazi members of the French and European Nationalist Party were responsible for a pair of anti-immigrant terror bombings in 1988. Sonacotra hostels in Cagnes-sur-Mer and Cannes were bombed, killing Romanian immigrant George Iordachescu and injuring 16 people, mostly Tunisians. In an attempt to frame Jewish extremists for the Cagnes-sur-Mer bombing, the terrorists left leaflets bearing Stars of David and the name Masada at the scene, with the message "To destroy Israel, Islam has chosen the sword. For this choice, Islam will perish."

On 28 May 2008, members of the neo-Nazi Nomad 88 group fired machine guns at people from their car in Saint-Michel-sur-Orge.

In the aftermath of the Charlie Hebdo shooting, six mosques and a restaurant were attacked, the attacks were classified as acts of right-wing terrorism by the authorities.

== List of significant terrorist incidents inside France ==
France
Date	Sub	Location	Deaths	Injuries	Type	Perpetrator	Description of target and attack
15 September 1958	Île-de-France	Paris	1	3	Small arms fire	FLN (Algerian nationalists)	– Government institutions Several gunmen fire into the car of the French Minister of Information, Jacques Soustelle. The minister survives unharmed, however four bystanders are struck and one is killed.
18 June 1961	Marne (department)	Blacy, Marne	28	100+	Improvised Explosive Device	Organisation armée secrète	– Private citizens & property A bomb attack on a Strasbourg–Paris train carried: it was the deadliest terrorist attack in modern French history until the November 2015 Paris attacks.
14 December 1973	Provence-Alpes-Côte d'Azur	Marseille	4	20	Improvised Explosive Device	Charles; Martel Group	– Diplomatic (Algeria) A man exits a car and throws a bomb into the compound of the Algerian Consulate; the subsequent explosion kills 4 and injures 20 more, 4 seriously.
15 September 1974	Île-de-France	Paris	2	34	Improvised Explosive Device	PFLP (Palestinian nationalists)	– Private Citizens & Property A bomb explodes at the Drugstore Saint Germain, part of the fashionable circuit of restaurants and bars on Paris's Left Bank, killing two and injuring 34.
24 October 1975	Île-de-France	Paris	2	-	Grenade & Small arms fire	ASALA (Armenian nationalists)	– Diplomatic (Turkish) As İsmail Erez is returning from a reception – and as his vehicle approached the building of the Turkish Embassy in Paris – a group of 3–4 armed Armenian militants ambush the automobile, killing him and his driver Talip Yener.
20 May 1978	Île-de-France	Paris	4	3	Grenade & Small arms fire	PFLP (Palestinian nationalists)	– Airports & airlines Three terrorists open fire on El Al passengers in the departure lounge. All three terrorists are killed, along with one policeman, and three French tourists are also injured.
5 October 1978	Provence-Alpes-Côte d'Azur	Marseille	9	12	Small arms fire		– Private citizens & property At about 21:00 (UTC+1), three hooded men armed with sub machine guns enter a quiet neighborhood bar and shoot 21 patrons, killing nine. The attack at Le Telephone bar was likely related to organized crime, although none of the attackers were identified.
23 December 1979	Île-de-France	Paris	1	-	Grenade & Small arms fire	ASALA (Armenian nationalists)	– Diplomatic (Turkish) A gunman fires an automatic weapon amid crowds of Christmas shoppers, killing the director of the Turkish National Tourist Office, Yilmaz Colton, in Paris. The director was struck by three bullets while walking along the Champs-Élysées.
28 January 1980	Île-de-France	Paris	1	8	Improvised Explosive Device		– Diplomatic (Syrian) A bomb blast destroys the ground floor of the Syrian Embassy, killing one and injuring 8 others. Three of those injured were in a serious condition, including a pregnant woman. The attack happened 2 hours before the arrival of then Foreign Minister of Syria, Abdel Halim Khaddam, in France.
17 July 1980	Île-de-France	Paris	2	4	Small arms fire	Guards of Islam (Iranian agents)	– Government institutions (Shah of Iran) Former Iranian Prime Minister Shahpour Bakhtiar escapes an assassination attempt in which a French policeman and a female neighbour are killed. Four other officers were wounded, one seriously. Allegedly posing as reporters, a trio of gunmen attempted to enter the exiled leader's apartment in Neuilly, a suburb of Paris. A police guard at an armored door to the residence resisted and a gunfight took place.
29 July 1980	Rhône-Alpes	Lyon	2	11	Small arms fire	ASALA (Armenian nationalists)	– Diplomatic (Turkish) Two gunmen storm the Turkish Consulate General in Lyon. The gunmen are unable to locate the Turkish consul general and open fire on the waiting area, killing two people and wounding eleven others, two seriously.
3 October 1980	Île-de-France	Paris	4	40	Improvised Explosive Device	-	– Religious figures & institutions A bomb went off outside the Union Libérale Israélite de France synagogue on Rue Copernic. The bomb had been hidden in the saddlebags of a motorcycle parked outside the synagogue on the eve of Simchat Torah. The explosion happened shortly before the end of services, however one of those killed were members of the congregation. French police initially suspected that the attack had been carried out by neo-Nazis, but later attributed it to the PFLP or one of its offshoots. See also: 1980 Paris synagogue bombing
25 November 1980	Île-de-France	Paris	2	1	Small arms fire	-	– Private citizens & property An unknown gunman murders the Jewish owners of a Paris travel agency that specialized in tours to Israel. The assailant walked into the office of IT-Tours and fired from an automatic pistol, fatally wounding Edwin Douek, the proprietor. His wife, Michele, was killed instantly and a clerk was slightly wounded. Edwin Douek died of his wounds later in a hospital.
4 March 1981	Île-de-France	Paris	2	1	Small arms fire	ASALA (Armenian nationalists)	– Diplomatic (Turkish) Two gunmen open fire on Turkish Labour Attaché, Resat Morali, and the Religious Affairs Officer in the Turkish Embassy, Tecelli Ari. Both are killed.
24 September 1981	Île-de-France	Paris	1	2	Small arms fire – Hostage taking (2 days)	ASALA (Armenian nationalists)	– Diplomatic (Turkish) At about 11:30 CET, four members of Armenian Secret Army for the Liberation of Armenia took over the consulate killing a Turkish guard, wounding the Turkish Consul and taking 56 people hostage, including 8 women and a 3-year-old child. Shortly after midnight, the militants' leader started the negotiations that led to the end of the ordeal at about 2 a.m. He was promised by French authorities that the four militants would receive political asylum. The next day, however, the French Government issued a statement saying that the men would have to stand trial on charges growing out of the assault, including the death of a Turkish guard. See also: 1981 Turkish consulate attack in Paris
29 March 1982	Limousin	Ambazac	5	27	Improvised Explosive Device	Carlos the Jackal	– Transport A explosion on a Paris-Toulouse express train kills five passengers and injures 27 near Ambazac. The blast in the baggage compartment of the Capitole Express was caused by several pounds of extremely powerful explosives, intentionally planted. In 2011 Carlos the Jackal was tried for involvement in the attack and was subsequently convicted and sentenced to life in prison.
22 April 1982	Île-de-France	Paris	1	47	Car bomb	Carlos the Jackal	– Political A powerful car bomb detonates in a crowded street in central Paris during the morning rush hour, killing a young woman and injuring 46 people. The apparent target are the offices of the Libyan newspaper Al-Watan al-Arabi. In 2011 Carlos the Jackal is tried for involvement in the attacks and is subsequently convicted and sentenced to life in prison.
9 August 1982	Île-de-France	Paris	6	22	Grenade & Small arms fire	Abu Nidal Organization	– Private Citizens & Property Two assailants throw grenades into the dining room of the Chez Jo Goldenberg restaurant and fire machine guns at the patrons. Six people die, including two American tourists, and 22 others are wounded in the attack on the Jewish restaurant in Paris's Marais district. See also: Goldenberg restaurant attack
21 August 1982	Île-de-France	Paris	1	2	Improvised Explosive Device	-	– Diplomatic (United States) A bomb, that police said was intended to target a United States diplomat, explodes on a luxurious residential street on the Left Bank near the Eiffel Tower, killing a bomb disposal expert and wounding two others. The bomb had been planted under the vehicle of Roderick Grant, commercial counselor at the United States Embassy in Paris.
28 February 1983	Île-de-France	Paris	1	4	Improvised Explosive Device	ASALA (Armenian nationalists)	– Private Citizens & Property A bomb detonates at the Turkish-owned Marmara Voyages tourism agency in central Paris, killing one female employee and injuring four others. The blast reportedly caused the roof of the offices to collapse.
15 July 1983	Île-de-France	Paris	8	55	Improvised Explosive Device	ASALA (Armenian nationalists)	– Airports & airlines A bomb explodes inside a suitcase at the Turkish Airlines check-in desk in the south terminal of the Orly Airport, sending flames through the crowd of passengers checking in for a flight to Istanbul. The bomb consisted of a half kilo of Semtex explosive connected to three portable gas bottles, which caused extensive burns on the victims. Three people were killed immediately in the blast and another five died in hospital. Four of the victims were French, two were Turkish, one was American, and one was Swedish. Main article: 1983 Orly Airport attack
5 August 1983	Provence-Alpes-Côte d'Azur	Avignon	7	–	Small arms fire		– Private citizens & property At approximately 4:00 (UTC+1), two gunmen shoot to dead seven people at a Sofitel Hotel in a popular holiday town. The victims include the French consul-general for Saarbrücken in West Germany, Lucien Andre. Three other hotel guests and three employees of Sofitel were also killed after apparently being rounded up and ushered into a hotel room.
1 October 1983	Provence-Alpes-Côte d'Azur	Marseille	1	26	Improvised Explosive Device	ASALA (Armenian nationalists)	– Private Citizens & Property One man is killed and 26 people injured when multiple bombs destroyed the American, Soviet and Algerian pavilions at an international trade fair in Marseille. An Armenian guerrilla group took responsibility for the attack in a telephone call to the police. However then Interior Minister, Gaston Defferre, later stated that the far rightist Charles Martel Group had also taken responsibility for the blast.
31 December 1983	Provence-Alpes-Côte d'Azur	Marseille	5	58+	Improvised Explosive Device	Carlos the Jackal	– Transport A bomb explodes in the two first-class cars of an AGV locomotive as it heads north toward Paris, from the Gare de Marseille-Saint-Charles. Although the train was travelling at about 160 kilometres per hour, it does not derail. Rescue workers find 2 passengers dead and 20 wounded, 5 of them seriously. Half an hour later a second bomb explodes in the baggage checkroom of the main hall at the Gare de Marseille-Saint-Charles, killing 2 people and wounding at least 38. In 2011 Carlos the Jackal is tried for involvement in the attacks and is subsequently convicted and sentenced to life in prison.
7 February 1984	Île-de-France	Paris	2	1	Small arms fire	Hezbollah & Islamic Jihad	– Government institutions (Shah of Iran) Gholam Ali Oveisi, a four-star general under Iran's late shah, and his brother, an ex-colonel, are killed by gunmen in central Paris. Their driver is also wounded.
8 February 1984	Île-de-France	Paris	1	–	Small arms fire	Abu Nidal Organization	– Diplomatic (Emirati) A lone gunman shoots and kills the United Arab Emirates' ambassador to France outside the diplomat's Paris home. Khalifa Ahmed Abdel Aziz al-Mubarak is killed in a district of Paris nearby the Eiffel tower.
25 January 1985	Île-de-France	Paris	1	–	Small arms fire	Action Directe	– Government institutions General René Audran, a senior official of the French Ministry of Defence, is shot to dead in front of his residence at La Celle-Saint-Cloud.
23 February 1985	Île-de-France	Paris	1	15	Improvised Explosive Device	–	– Private Citizens & Property A bomb explodes at an entrance to the Paris branch of the British-owned department store Marks & Spencer as it opened for business, killing a man and wounding 15 other people. Telephone calls claiming responsibility were received from the Caribbean Revolutionary Alliance, an outlawed group seeking the independence of France's Caribbean territories; and from Direct Action, a left-wing extremist group that had announced its fusion with the Red Army Faction terrorists of Germany.
3 March 1985	Île-de-France	Paris	4	–	Small arms fire	–	– Government institutions (Foreign: Khmer Rouge) Try Meng Huot – a doctor in chemistry who had been a lecturer at the University of Paris before he became a Khmer Rouge leader – is killed in his Parisian apartment alongside his wife and another unidentified couple.
20 March 1986	Île-de-France	Paris	2	28	Improvised Explosive Device	CSPPA (Lebanese faction)	– Private Citizens & Property A bomb explodes in a packed mall of luxury boutiques on the Champs-Elysees, killing 2 people and wounding 28. A second bomb, found on a metro train, was defused by police demolition experts before it could explode. A terrorist organization calling itself the Committee of Solidarity With Arab and Middle Eastern Political Prisoners asserted responsibility for the attack in a handwritten letter sent to the Beirut office of a Western news agency.
25 April 1986	Rhône-Alpes	Lyon	1	–	Small arms fire	–	– Business Kenneth Marston, director of a French subsidiary of Black & Decker, is shot to death outside his home.
9 September 1986	Île-de-France	Paris	1	18	Improvised Explosive Device	CSPPA (Lebanese faction)	– Government institutions A bomb explodes inside the post office of the Hôtel de Ville, killing one person and wounding 18 others. The dead woman is identified as Marguerite Thuault, an employee of the post office.
15 September 1986	Île-de-France	Paris	1	51	Improvised Explosive Device	CSPPA (Lebanese faction)	– Government institutions A bomb explodes inside the Parisian police headquarters, killing one person and wounding 51 others, two seriously.
17 September 1986	Île-de-France	Paris	5	50+	Improvised Explosive Device	CSPPA (Lebanese faction)	– Private Citizens & Property A bomb thrown from a passing car explodes in front of a Tati department store on the Left Bank, killing at least 5 people and wounding about 50. The blast, which occurred about 17:30, destroyed the entire front of the seven-story building on the rue de Rennes.
18 October 1986	Provence-Alpes-Côte d'Azur	Toulon	4	–	Car bomb	–	– A car explodes in the seafront market place at Toulon, killing the four occupants and setting fire to a nearby building. The police said it may have been carrying explosives in preparation for a bomb attack.
17 November 1986	Île-de-France	Paris	1	–	Small arms fire	Action Directe	– Business A man and woman firing from a motorcycle kill the head of the French auto-maker Renault. Georges Besse is struck down by gunfire as he exited from his car, unaccompanied by bodyguards. He had been appointed chairman of the company in January 1985.
19 December 1988	Provence-Alpes-Côte d'Azur	Cagnes sur Mer	1	12	Improvised Explosive Device	French and European Nationalist Party	– Private Citizens & Property At 3:00 (UTC+1), two homemade bombs explode at a crowded hostel for mostly North African immigrant workers, killing a Romanian national and wounding at least 12 others. The first blast destroyed a number of vehicles on the street, and following this a second blast, under the main stairwell of the building, destroyed the corridor into which many residents had come to check the first blast.
5 October 1994	Île-de-France	Paris	4	6	Small arms fire – Hostage taking	–	– Government institutions Three police officers and a taxi driver are killed, and six other people – including two more officers – are wounded in separate shoot outs with two masked gunmen in Paris. The pair broke into a Paris police station to steal fire arms, then took a taxi driver hostage and forced him to drive them to the Bois de Vincennes park on the outskirts of Paris, where the final shoot out took place.
25 July 1995	Île-de-France	Paris	8	150	Improvised explosive device	GIA (Islamists)	– Transport Eight people are killed and 150 wounded in an explosion of a gas canister packed with nails and bolts on a Paris regional train at the Gare de Saint-Michel-Notre-Dame rail station. The bombing was claimed by the Armed Islamic Group as reprisals for French support for Algeria's army-backed government.
3 December 1996	Île-de-France	Paris	3	85	Improvised explosive device	GIA (Islamists)	– Transport A blast at 18:03 CET rips open the doors of a train on the southbound track of the Port Royal station of the regional express network on the Left Bank, scattering the wounded – totaling over 85 – over the platform. Three people succumb to injuries caused by the bomb made from a 28-pound camping gas canister filled with nails.
19 April 2000	Brittany	Plévin	1	–	Improvised explosive device	–	– Private Citizens & Property A bomb explodes beside a McDonald's in a small town in Brittany, killing a restaurant worker. The explosion, in the Dinan area, happens at about 10:00 CET, near the restaurant's drive-through window.
6 December 2007	Île-de-France	Paris	1	4	Improvised explosive device	–	– Private Citizens & Property A parcel bomb explodes at a legal office in central Paris killing a secretary and seriously injuring a lawyer. Several other people were lightly hurt in the unclaimed blast shortly before 13:00 CET on the fourth floor of a building in the capital's fashionable eighth arrondissement or district.
16 December 2008	Paris	Paris	0	0	Failed explosive device	Afghan Revolutionary Front	– Government institutions A group so-called Afghan Revolutionary Front left a bundle of dynamite in the third floor restroom of the menswear department inside a department store in Paris, and sent a letter to police saying several bombs were planted in the store and that they demanded that France withdraw from Afghanistan. The first device was defused and no casualties were reported.
15 March 2012	Midi-Pyrénées	Montauban	2	1	Small arms fire	Mohammed Merah (Islamist)	– Government institutions At around 14:00 CET, two uniformed soldiers were killed and a third was seriously injured outside a shopping centre in Montauban, while withdrawing money from a cash machine. They were all from the 17th Parachute Engineer Regiment (17^{e} Régiment du génie parachutiste), whose barracks are close to the town. Corporal Abel Chennouf, 24, and Private Mohamed Legouad, 23, both of North African origin, were killed. Corporal Loïc Liber, 28, from Guadeloupe, was left in a coma. See also: Toulouse and Montauban shootings
19 March 2012	Midi-Pyrénées	Toulouse	5 (one perp.)	1	Small arms fire	Mohammed Merah (Islamist)	– Religious figures & institutions At about 8:00 CET, a man drove up to the Ozar Hatorah school on a motorcycle. He dismounted, and immediately opened fire toward the schoolyard. Four people died: 30-year-old Rabbi Jonathan (Yonatan) Sandler; his two oldest (out of three) children Aryeh, aged 6, and Gabriel, aged 3; and the head teacher's daughter, eight-year-old Miriam Monsonego, the girl shot in the head. Bryan Bijaoui, a 17-year-old Jewish boy, was gravely injured. See also: Toulouse and Montauban shootings
7 January 2015	Île-de-France	Paris	14 (2 perps.)	11	Small arms fire	Al-Qaeda in the Arabian Peninsula	– Private Citizens & Property At about 11:30 CET, two militants armed with assault rifles and other weapons forced their way into the offices of the French satirical weekly newspaper Charlie Hebdo in Paris. They fired up to 50 shots, initially killing 11 people and injuring 11 others, and shouted "Allahu Akbar" (Arabic for "God is [the] greatest") during their attack. Main articles: Charlie Hebdo shooting and January 2015 Île-de-France attacks
9 January 2015	Île-de-France	Paris	5 (one perp.)	9	Small arms fire – hostage taking (1 day)	Amedy Coulibaly (Islamist)	– Private Citizens & Property At about 1:00 CET, an Islamist militant who pledged allegiance to Islamic State, enters the Hypercacher kosher superette in Porte de Vincennes and takes up to 20 Jewish patrons hostage. Four Jewish hostages die and held fifteen others are held during a siege in which Coulibaly demands that the two militants responsible for the attack on the satirical weekly newspaper Charlie Hebdo not be harmed. Main articles: Porte de Vincennes siege and January 2015 Île-de-France attacks
26 June 2015	Rhône-Alpes	Saint-Quentin-Fallavier	1	2	Bladed weapon & Improvised Explosive Device	Yassine Salhi (Islamist)	– Private Citizens & Property At about 9:30 CEST, a suspected Islamic militant decapitates a man and drives a company van into gas cylinders at an Air Products' gas factory near Lyon. The attacker placed the head of a victim on a fence railing, and planted two Jihadist flag banners alongside it. Video surveillance footage showed that the perpetrator also tried to ignite several canisters containing flammable chemicals. Main article: Saint-Quentin-Fallavier attack
21 August 2015	Nord-Pas-de-Calais	Oignies	0	5	Small arms, bladed weapons	Ayoub El Khazzani (Islamist)	– Transport At about 17:45 CEST, a 26-year-old Moroccan national carrying a Draco automatic rifle, magazines containing 300 rounds, a semi-automatic Luger pistol, and a box cutter, opened fire on a Thalys train traveling from Amsterdam to Paris. The gunman was attacked and subdued by seven men (four Americans, including an ex-pat, a Frenchman, an American-French citizen and a Briton), who beat him unconscious. The train was diverted to Arras where the man was arrested and identified, and two victims treated. The man had been previously flagged with an "S" card, France's warning alert for someone believed to be a national security risk. Main article: 2015 Thalys train attack
13 November 2015	Île-de-France	Paris, Saint-Denis	130 (+7)	368	AK-47 assault rifles, hand grenades, various explosives, suicide vests	Islamic State of Iraq and the Levant	– Private Citizens & Property On the evening of 13 November 2015, a series of coordinated terrorist attacks comprising mass shootings and suicide bombings occurred in Paris and Saint-Denis, France. Beginning at 21:16 CET, three separate explosions and six mass shootings occurred, including bombings near the Stade de France in the northern suburb of Saint-Denis. The deadliest attack was at the Bataclan theatre where attackers took hostages and engaged in a standoff with police until it was ended at 00:58 CET 14 November 2015. 130 civilians were killed in the attacks. Main article: November 2015 Paris attacks
14 July 2016	Nice	Nice	86 (+1)	434	Vehicular attack	Islamic State of Iraq and the Levant	– Private Citizens & Property On the evening of 14 July 2016, a vehicle-ramming attack took place in Nice, France when a man deliberately drove a cargo truck into a crowd of people celebrating Bastille Day on the Promenade des Anglais. 86 people were killed and 434 others were injured. Main article: 2016 Nice truck attack
13 June 2016	Île-de-France	Magnanville	2	0	Knife	Islamic State of Iraq and the Levant	– Private Citizens & Property On 13 June 2016, a police officer and his wife, a police secretary, were stabbed to death in their home in Magnanville (about 55 km or 35 miles west of Paris) by a man acting on an "order" by ISIL to "kill infidels". Main article: 2016 Magnanville stabbing
3 February 2017	Île-de-France	Paris	0	1	Knife	Islamic State of Iraq and the Levant	– Private Citizens & Property On 3 February 2017, armed with two 40-centimetre machetes a 29-year-old Egyptian terrorist attacked patrolling guards outside the Louvre museum. One of the guards was slightly injured during the attack as the perpetrator was shot dead. Main article: 2017 Paris machete attack
20 April 2017	Île-de-France	Paris	1 (+1)	3	AK-47 assault rifle	Islamic State of Iraq and the Levant	– Police officers & Private Citizen On 20 April 2017, a police officer was killed and two more were injured alongside a tourist by an assailant wielding a Kalashnikov rifle on the Champs-Élysées, a shopping boulevard in Paris, France. Main article: 2017 shooting of Paris police officers
23 March 2018	Aude	Aude	4 (+1)	15	Handgun, hunting knife and homemade explosives	Islamic State of Iraq and the Levant	– Police officers & Private Citizens On 23 March 2018, a 25 year old assailant hijacked a car in Carcassonne, France, killing one. He then shot at some off duty officers and then drove to the nearby town of Trèbes where he stormed a local supermarket, killing three, including a policeman, and taking several hostage. He was later shot and killed. Main article: Carcassonne and Trèbes attack
12 May 2018	Île-de-France	Paris	1 (+1)	4	Knife	Islamic State of Iraq and the Levant	– Private Citizen A 21-year-old Chechnia-born man armed with a knife, killed one pedestrian and injured four more near the Palais Garnier, the opera house in Paris, France, before being fatally shot by police. Main article: 2018 Paris knife attack
11 December 2018	Grand Est	Strasbourg	5 (+1)	11	Modele 1892 revolver and knife	Islamic State of Iraq and the Levant	– Private Citizens A 29-year-old French citizen of Algerian origin killed five civilians and wounded 11 others at a Christmas market in Strasbourg, France, before being killed in a shootout with police two days later. Main article: 2018 Strasbourg attack
24 May 2019	Rhône-Alpes	Lyon	0	13	Improvised Explosive Device	Islamic State of Iraq and the Levant	– Private Citizens A packet bomb explodes in front of a bakery in the pedestrian zone of Lyon. 13 people were wounded. A 24-year old male student from Algeria was arrested 3 days later. No group has claimed responsibility of the attack yet. Main article: 2019 Lyon bomb attack
3 October 2019	Île-de-France	Paris	4 (+1)	2	Ceramic Knife	Islamist	– Police Employees A radicalized Islamist stabbed four people to death, and injured two others at the central police headquarters in Paris. He was an administrative worker and had been recently converting to Salafist Islam. The perpetrator was shot instantly dead by other officers. Main article: Paris police headquarters stabbing
3 January 2020	Île-de-France	Villejuif	1 (+1)	2	Knife	Islamist	– Civilians A man stabbed three people in Villejuif, a suburb of Paris, killing one person and wounding two others. The attacker was shot dead by police. The attacker was identified as Nathan Chiasson, a follower of Salafism, an extremist sect of Islam.
4 April 2020	Auvergne-Rhône-Alpes	Romans-sur-Isère	2	5	Knife	Islamist	-Civilians Two people were killed and five others wounded in a mass stabbing in Romans-sur-Isère, Auvergne-Rhône-Alpes, France. The suspect is a 30-year-old Sudanese asylum seeker who was arrested at the scene. French police have launched a terrorism investigation. Two other people related to the attacker were arrested later. Main article: 2020 Romans-sur-Isère knife attack
27 April 2020	Île-de-France	Colombes	0	3	Vehicle	Islamist	-Civilians Three police officers were seriously injured when a driver rammed his vehicle into them in Colombes, Hauts-de-Seine. The perpetrator was arrested, and a source stated that the man carried out the attack to "avenge events in Palestine". The attacker had pledged allegiance to Islamic State.
25 September 2020	Île-de-France	Paris	0	2	Knife	Islamist	-Civilians A knife attack outside the former headquarters of the satirical magazine Charlie Hebdo in Paris, France, left two people wounded. The building is now used by a television production company, and the two wounded victims are workers of the company. The suspected perpetrator and six other people were taken into custody. Interior minister Gérald Darmanin said that the attack was "clearly an act of Islamist terrorism". Main article: 2020 Paris stabbing attack
16 October 2020	Île-de-France	Éragny-sur-Oise	1 (+1)	0	Knife	Islamist	-Teacher A teacher was beheaded near a school in Conflans-Sainte-Honorine, a suburb of Paris, the attacker was shot dead by police. The victim is said to have shown controversial cartoons of Muhammad to his students. President Emmanuel Macron called the attack an "Islamist terrorist attack". Main article: Murder of Samuel Paty
29 October 2020	Nice	Nice	3	0 (+1)	Knife	Islamist	-Churchgoers Three people were killed in a stabbing attack at Notre-Dame de Nice, a Roman Catholic basilica, in Nice, France. One of the victims, a woman, was beheaded by the attacker. Several additional victims were injured. The attacker, who was shot by the police, was taken into custody. The Mayor of Nice and police said the incident appeared to be an Islamic extremism terrorist attack. Main article: 2020 Nice stabbing

=== List of international terrorist incidents with significant French casualties ===
- 42 French citizens were murdered by the Hamas terrorist organization during its attack inside Israel on October 7, 2023.
- 6 French nationals died as a result of the Kouré shooting in Niger on 9 August 2020.
- 4 French nationals died as a result of the Étoile du Sud hotel attack in Grand-Bassam in Ivory Coast on 13 March 2016.
- 3 French nationals died as a result of the Cappuccino restaurant and the Splendid Hotel attack in Ouagadougou, in Burkina Faso on 15 January 2016.
- 4 French nationals died and seven were injured as a result of the Bardo National Museum attack in Tunisia on 18 March 2015.
- 2 French nationals died as a result of the assault on the Nairobi Westgate shopping complex in Kenya 21–24 September 2013.
- 8 French nationals died as a result of the bombing of the Argana Cafe in Jemaa el-Fnaa square of Marrakesh in Morocco on 28 April 2011.
- 2 French nationals died as a result of attacks on several hotels and other tourist locations in Mumbai in India 26–29 November 2008.
- 4 French nationals died and one was injured as a result of an armed attack on a group of tourists on holiday near Aleg in Mauritania on 24 December 2007.
- 4 French nationals died as a result of the bombing of several Balinese tourist clubs in Indonesia on 12 October 2002.
- 4 French nationals died as a result of the September 11 attacks.

== Foiled attacks ==
In 2015, a 25-year-old Moroccan man known as a member of the radical Islamist movement attempted to open fire with an AK47 assault rifle while on a high speed train one hour from Paris. He was quickly subdued by three United States servicemen who were on holiday. See: 2015 Thalys train attack

Towards the end of March 2016, police arrested a Paris citizen named Reda Kriket, and upon searching his apartment, they discovered five assault rifles, a number of handguns, and an amount of chemical substances that could be used to make explosives.

Kriket was convicted in absentia by a Belgian court in a 2015 case involving Abdelhamid Abaaoud.

== Murder of Sarah Halimi ==
Under French law, any grave act of violence committed with intent "to seriously disturb public order through intimidation or terror", is an act of terrorism; the public prosecutor decides which cases will be investigated as acts of terrorism. Writing in Le Figaro attorney Gilles-William Goldnadel characterized the public prosecutor's decision not to investigate a crime, murder of Sarah Halimi as terrorism, as "purely and simply ideological", asserting that the killer, who recited verses from the Quran before breaking into an apartment and murdering a Jewish woman, "had the profile of a radical Islamist, and yet somehow there is a resistance to call a spade a spade". Sarah Halimi's murder was heard by neighbors in her building and in neighboring building over an extended period of time. Neighbors also saw the killer throw his victim from the balcony of her home, and heard the killer praying aloud after the murder. In September, 2017, the prosecutor officially characterized the murder as an "antisemitic" hate crime.

According to Jean-Charles Brisard, director of the French think tank Center for the Analysis of Terrorism, "It needs to have a certain degree of willingness to disrupt the French public order."

== See also ==
- Law on the fight against terrorism, 2006 French legislation
- Terrorism in the European Union
- List of Islamist terrorist attacks
- ISIL-related terror attacks in France
- 2014 Dijon attack
- Murder of Sarah Halimi
- List of massacres in France
- Jean-François Ricard (born 1956), prosecutor of the National Terrorism Prosecution Office for the prosecution of terrorism in France
- Islamic terrorism in Europe
- List of terrorist incidents
- Terrorism in the United States
- Hindu terrorism
  - Violence against Christians in India
  - Violence against Muslims in independent India
- Left-wing terrorism
- Right-wing terrorism
