= 2017 Paris attack =

2017 Paris attack may refer to:

- 2017 Paris machete attack, 3 February 2017
- March 2017 Île-de-France attacks, 18 March 2017
- 2017 shooting of Paris police officers, 20 April 2017
- 2017 Notre Dame attack, 6 June 2017
- June 2017 Champs-Élysées car ramming attack, 19 June 2017
