= Lyon attack =

Lyon attack meaning various serious attacks in an around Lyon, France may refer to:

- 1980 Turkish Consulate attack in Lyon
- 2002 Lyon synagogue attack
- 2015 Saint-Quentin-Fallavier attack near Lyon
- 2019 Lyon bombing
- 2019 Lyon stabbings
