= 2020 Romans-sur-Isère knife attack =

Stabbing attack in France

- Location: 45°02′47″N 05°03′06″E; Romans-sur-Isère, Auvergne-Rhône-Alpes, France
- Date: 4 April 2020; 10:45 a.m. CET
- Target: Civilians
- Weapon: Knife
- Deaths: 2
- Injuries: 5
- Perpetrator: Abdallah Ahmed-Osman
- Motive: Jihadism (Islamic terrorism)

In late morning on 4 April 2020, a knife attack occurred in Romans-sur-Isère, Auvergne-Rhône-Alpes, France, resulting in the death of two people and the wounding of five others. The attacker, Abdallah Ahmed-Osman, a 33-year old Sudanese refugee, was charged with terrorist crimes.

== Attack ==
The attacker entered a tobacco shop, where he stabbed the two owners and a customer, wounding them; he went on to a butcher's shop, where he stole a knife and killed a customer. He then killed another man, the owner of a local theatre who died shielding his twelve-year-old son, and then wounded two people waiting in line outside a bakery.

The suspect was a 33-year-old Sudanese man who had obtained refugee status and a 10-year visa in 2017. According to Arabic-speaking witnesses, he shouted "Allah Akbar" when he launched his attack and, at the time of his arrest, kneeled down and recited the Shahada, the Muslim profession of faith. A terrorism investigation was launched. Searches at his home revealed handwritten notes complaining about living in a "country of disbelievers". On 8 April, he was indicted for "assassinations and attempted assassinations in connection with a terrorist group".

The attack occurred during the national lockdown due to the COVID-19 pandemic in France.

== See also ==
- Paris police headquarters stabbing
- 2017 London Bridge attack
- 2016 Nice truck attack
- November 2015 Paris attacks
- 2019 Lyon bombing
- 2019 Lyon stabbings
- Murder of Samuel Paty
