= 2017 Levallois-Perret attack =

Terrorist attack in Paris, France

- Location: 48°53′42″N 2°17′14″E; Levallois-Perret, Hauts-de-Seine, France
- Date: 9 August 2017; 07:45 (car-ramming), 13:30 (arrest) (UTC+1)
- Target: Soldiers taking part in Opération Sentinelle
- Attack type: Vehicular attack
- Weapon: BMW vehicle
- Deaths: 0
- Injuries: 6 (+1 attacker)
- Perpetrator: Hamou Benlatrèche
- Motive: Islamist terrorism

On the morning of 9 August 2017, a driver rammed a car into a group of soldiers in the commune of Levallois-Perret in the northwestern suburbs of Paris. Six soldiers patrolling the area as part of Opération Sentinelle were injured in the attack, three of them seriously. The driver fled the scene and, several hours later, was shot and arrested by an elite police unit on a highway near the town of Marquise, Pas-de-Calais after attempting to ram a roadblock. According to the French police the incident was terrorist-related. The attack is part of a series of similar attacks by jihadists in Western countries.

On 23 August 2017, French prosecutors pressed terrorism charges against the suspect, 36-year-old Algerian Hamou Benlatrèche, who was said to have "radical beliefs and showed interest in the Islamic State group." He was later sentenced to 30 years in prison.

== Context ==
The attack was part of a series of terrorist attacks in France since November 2015, about half of which targeted police of the military patrols that appeared in the streets of France with the imposition of the state of emergency that had been in continuous effect since the November 2015 Paris attacks. The site of the attack, Levallois-Perret is home to the headquarters of France's main intelligence agency, the General Directorate for Internal Security (DCRI), and also the staging point for soldiers assigned to protect sensitive sites in the French capital.

== Attack ==
On the morning of 9 August 2017 at around 07:45, a driver rammed a car into a dozen soldiers as they left their barracks in Place de Verdun. The driver had positioned his car in "ambush" in an alley from which he could see the soldiers emerge. The soldiers were members of the 35th Infantry Regiment, stationed in Belfort to take part in Opération Sentinelle. According to Interior Minister Gérard Collomb, the driver approached slowly, then sped up to deliberately target the soldiers. At least six were injured, three of them seriously, one of whom was left unconscious. The driver fled the scene while the remaining soldiers tried to give chase.

Four of the victims were transported to the Bégin Military Teaching Hospital in Saint-Mandé and the two more severely wounded soldiers were transported to the Hôpital d'instruction des armées Percy in Clamart. French Interior Minister Gérard Collomb and Defense Minister Florence Parly both visited injured soldiers at the Bégin Military Teaching Hospital later the same day.

The U.S. Embassy in Paris warned Americans to avoid the Levallois-Perret area following the attack.

=== Capture and arrests ===
A large police operation of several hundred agents was deployed to capture the suspect. Government spokesman Christophe Castaner said that "all means are mobilized to neutralize the person or persons who are responsible," and that President Emmanuel Macron had discussed the attack at a security meeting and at a cabinet meeting. Several hours after the attack, at around 13:30, the Rouen and Lille elite police unit Research and Intervention Brigade cornered and stopped the driver near a petrol station on a motorway in Marquise, Pas-de-Calais after being spotted in Leulinghen-Bernes some 260 kilometers (162 miles) north of the capital on the A16 autoroute. After being stopped in his car and ignoring several calls by police, the driver reached his hand as if attempting to grab a weapon, causing police to fire. The driver received five gunshot wounds and was sent to a hospital in serious condition, as was a policeman who was also injured by a stray bullet fired by one of his colleagues. French Prime Minister Édouard Philippe confirmed that the man arrested was the same who committed the attack.

The car was a BMW 2 Series Active Tourer rental car. A testimonial, a report from a police officer, as well as a tracker that had been installed by the company to the person who rented the vehicle, for which the suspect worked as a driver, made it possible to locate the vehicle. The police officer reporting the vehicle had recorded its license number after driving on the highway north of Paris and noticing "a car passing at full speed with its windshield, hood and front bumper damaged."

Later the same day, investigators raided several addresses in Île-de-France associated with the suspect. A second man, a relative of the first, was arrested and held for questioning in Marseille.

=== Suspect and investigation ===
The suspect is a 36-year-old Algerian national Hamou Benlatrèche living in the Paris suburb of Bezons. He had no previous convictions by a French court, but was known to police since 2013 for committing an offense of assisting illegal immigrants. A member of the Tablighi Jamaat movement, he was described by his uncle as "a faithful Muslim who prayed regularly" and frequented a mosque near his home in Val-d'Oise, but was not known to have been radicalised. He was not registered among the several thousand Islamic extremists and potential threats to national security monitored by French intelligence.

Benlatrèche was held in a hospital in Lille and was not expected to recover sufficiently to be questioned for several weeks.

Interior Minister Gérard Collomb visited the scene of the attack late in the afternoon, and confirmed that a terrorist investigation has been launched. He said the attack after how it happened was "clearly a deliberate act." Patrick Balkany, mayor of Levallois-Perret described the attack as "without doubt a deliberate act" and "an odious aggression against our military."

On 23 August 2017, the French anti-terrorism prosecutor Francois Molins pressed charges of "attempted murder of security forces in connection with a terrorist enterprise" against Benlatrèche, saying that he "had radical beliefs and showed interest in the Islamic State group." He had also reportedly shown interest in traveling to Syria.

Benlatrèche was sentenced to 30 years in prison in 2021. The sentencing was upheld after an appeal in 2023.

== See also ==
- Sept-Sorts car attack, a few days later
