= 2017 Notre-Dame de Paris attack =

Terrorist attack on a policeman in Paris, France

- 2017 Notre-Dame de Paris attack (Paris)
- Location: 48.853675°N 2.348208°E; Paris, France
- Date: 6 June 2017 c. 16:00 (CET)
- Weapon: Hammer
- Deaths: 0
- Injuries: 2 (including the attacker)
- Perpetrator: Farid Ikken
- Motive: Terrorism in France inspired by ISIL.

On 6 June 2017, at around 16:00 CET, French police shot a man who attacked a police officer with a hammer outside Notre-Dame de Paris cathedral on the Île de la Cité, located in the centre of Paris. The man injured the officer with the hammer, and was found to be in possession of kitchen knives. French police opened a terrorism investigation.

The accused is an Algerian-born journalist named Farid Ikken, who won an award for his prize-winning human rights writing in Sweden, before returning to Algeria where he started an online news site, and then, moved to France on a student visa, he was pursuing a PhD in communications at the time of the attack.

According to the prosecutor, a video in which he pledged allegiance to ISIS was found at the accused's apartment.

== Context ==
The attack followed other attacks or attempted attacks around French landmarks in 2017, including the Louvre machete attack in February, the Orly airport attack in March, and the Champs-Elysées attack in April. French landmarks have received constant police protection because they are regarded as being "especially vulnerable," these security measures are part of a state of emergency which has been in place in France from 2015 to late 2017.

On the day following this attack, the Macron government officially announced the creation of a new intelligence task force, dubbed the National Centre for Counter Terrorism. The Centre, which had been in the planning stages for some months, is under the direct authority of the French President. Macron appointed Pierre de Bousquet de Florian to head the new Centre.

== Attack ==
According to a police spokesman, the accused "approached a police officer, took a hammer from his backpack and hit a police officer over the head," injuring the officer. The assailant was also carrying knives.

The accused reportedly shouted "c'est pour la Syrie" ("this is for Syria") during the attack, before being shot in the chest by another officer. After being shot, the accused asserted that he was "un soldat du califat" (a soldier of the caliphate). Immediately after the incident, Gérard Collomb, the French Minister of the Interior, said the man had a form of identification indicating he was a student from Algeria.

Nine hundred people were locked down inside the cathedral for two hours. American diplomat and national security expert Nancy Soderberg and her 16-year-old niece were among the visitors trapped inside the Cathedral; the international press ran photos tweeted out by Soderberg showing hundreds of visitors sitting with their hands in the air.

== Legal proceedings ==
The accused appeared in court on 10 June 2017 and was charged with associating with terrorists and attempting to murder law enforcement officials.

According to prosecutor Francois Molins, the accused's laptop and USB keys contained: a manual for "lone wolves" issued by so-called Islamic State (IS); images of the London attack three days previously; videos "glorifying" earlier attacks in Paris and Brussels; and a videoed message of support for IS which Ikken had tried but failed to upload on to social media on the eve of the attack. Molins added that Ikken had never shown any sign of radicalisation to those close to him, had never been convicted, was unknown to the intelligence services and that, no signs of contact with anyone in Iraq or Syria had been found.

The investigation has been assigned to the antiterrorist section of the criminal Brigade and to the General Directorate for Internal Security (DGSI). Prosecutor Francois Molins described Ikken as an intellectual and a successful man who had never given the slightest indication of Islamist sympathies. Molins said that Ikken had described himself as having radicalized himself over the course of 10 months. Hany Farid, Dartmouth professor and advisor to the Counter Extremism Project, cites Ikken's self-radicalization to argue that social media companies have a responsibility to crack down on incitement to violence.

== Perpetrator ==
Farid Ikken (born 1977 in Akbou, Algeria), who was in France legally as a PhD student of communications who had been registered at the University of Lorraine, Metz campus, since 2014. His thesis advisor described him as a "strong advocate of western democracy."

The London Times described Ikken as having a biography that is "far removed from those of the disaffected young extremists who have carried out a dozen attacks in France over the past three years." Jason Burke wrote about Ikken in The Guardian as an older, highly educated, man described by friends as "soft, secular" and attracted to violent jihad without being attracted to the Muslim faith, thereby demonstrating the impossibility of detecting potential terrorists by watching for particular profiles.

Born in Algeria to a "middle class" family, Ikken married a Swedish national and moved to Sweden in 2004. The marriage broke up in 2004. He studied journalism in both Stockholm and Uppsala. He worked as a freelance journalist for several newspapers and a radio station. Radio Sweden has confirmed that he worked for them as an intern for 6 weeks in 2010, reporting local news in Gothenburg. Swedish Security Service (Säpo) have stated that they have no previous knowledge of Ikken. In 2011 he returned to Algeria, where he worked as a journalist, created an online newsletter, and opening a public relations agency, before deciding to return to France and earn a PhD. According to relatives, he had grown up in a secular family, but became a devout Muslim while living in Sweden.

He was living in a rented flat in Cergy-Pontoise at the time of the attack. He additionally worked as a journalist in Sweden and Algeria. In 2009 he was awarded the "National Journalist Prize" from the European Commission for his work in Sweden. According to the Swedish Union of Journalists, Ikken won the general category of the EU Commission's National Journalist Prize Against Discrimination for an article entitled Olaga vård ("Unlawful care") published in the newspaper Folket i Bild. The article was about "asylum seekers who are not entitled to medical care and who are therefore forced to seek medical care, as well as healthcare staff and others who still provide health care to asylum seekers." Ikken described himself as gratified to have been able to bring attention to the important topics of "discrimination and diversity".

He had lived in France for three years and was writing a dissertation on information science and communications. He claimed to be a "soldier of the caliphate" for the Islamic State of Iraq and the Levant (ISIS). Police searched his residence and found a video in which he pledged allegiance to ISIS. According to government spokesman Christophe Castaner, Ikken "never showed any sign of radicalisation" before the attack.

On the day following the attack, Ikken was hospitalized for gunshot wounds to the chest and was reported to be recovering.

In October 2020 Ikken was found guilty and was sentenced to 28 years in prison. Ikken showed no remorse at the verdict.

== See also ==
- Louvre machete attack
- June 2017 Champs-Élysées car ramming attack
- Notre-Dame de Paris bombing attempt
