= 2017 Orly Airport attack =

2017 terrorist attack in Paris, France

March 2017 Île-de-France attacks
- Location: Orly Airport, Garges-lès-Gonesse, France
- Date: 18 March 2017; 9 years ago 06:55 (UTC+1)
- Attack type: Shooting
- Deaths: 1 attacker
- Injuries: 2
- Perpetrator: Ziyed Ben Belgacem

The March 2017 Île-de-France attacks were a pair of terrorist attacks by the same individual in Garges-lès-Gonesse, an outer suburb of Paris, and at Orly International Airport near Paris on 18 March 2017. The attacker, a 39-year-old man identified as Ziyed Ben Belgacem, was shot dead after attempting to seize a weapon from a soldier patrolling the airport under Opération Sentinelle.

At Orly Airport, the attacker shouted that he wanted to kill and die in the name of Allah. The attack is officially regarded as an act of terrorism.

== Timeline of attacks ==
=== Initial attacks ===
The first attack took place at 06:55 local time in the suburb of Garges-lès-Gonesse when the attacker was stopped by police during a routine traffic stop. He used a pellet gun to shoot and lightly injure a female police officer before driving away. He abandoned his vehicle in Vitry-sur-Seine shortly afterwards, where he threatened the patrons of a bar and, saying "in the name of Allah," stole another car at gunpoint from a mother driving her daughter.

=== Airport attack ===
At about 08:30, he went to the departures level of the south terminal of Orly Airport and assaulted a member of a three-person patrol of air force soldiers. According to a description by François Molins of the Prosecutor's Office in Paris, "With a pistol in his right hand and a bag over his shoulder, he grabbed (the soldier) with his left arm, made her move backward by three to four meters (yards), positioning her as a shield, and pointed his revolver at her forehead," shouting "Put down your weapons! Put your hands on your head! I am here to die for Allah. Whatever happens, there will be deaths." As he struggled with the soldier, he knocked her to the ground and seized her FAMAS assault rifle. He was killed by the other two soldiers when the first soldier dropped to her knees and they opened fire. The attacker was found to have been carrying a gasoline can, a lighter, a Koran, a pack of cigarettes, and €750. The seizure of the assault rifle was filmed by an eyewitness.

== Suspect and aftermath ==
Belgacem is said to have been a radicalised French-born Muslim of North African origin who was a resident of Garges-lès-Gonesse. He was known to the authorities and on a police watchlist, though not on the Fiche "S" list of national security threats. Some reports say that he was born on 14 February 1978 in Paris. He had a lengthy criminal record that included convictions for armed robbery and had been in prison between March and November 2016. Due to his connection with radicalised Islamists, his home was searched in November 2015 following the Paris attacks a few years earlier.

The attack at the airport led to its temporary closure and the evacuation of about 3,000 people. All flights to and from Orly were suspended and some were diverted to the larger Charles de Gaulle Airport east of Paris. The airport's west terminal was fully reopened by early afternoon, but air movements at the south terminal remained partly suspended with only incoming flights being permitted.

== Impact and context ==
This was the sixth attack on police and military personnel guarding French cities during the state of emergency. Several terrorist attacks on police and soldiers had occurred in the Paris region by August 2017. In the February Louvre machete attack, a man attacked soldiers patrolling the entrance to the Louvre museum. In the 2017 Notre Dame attack, on 6 June, a man assaulted a police officer with a hammer at the cathedral of Notre Dame. In the 6 June 2017 Champs-Élysées car ramming attack an extremist attempted to ram a car filled with explosives into a police patrol on the Champs-Élysées.

== See also ==
- January 2015 Île-de-France attacks
