= Law on the fight against terrorism =

Counter-terrorism legislation in France

Law on the fight against terrorism Loi relative à la lutte contre le terrorisme

French Parliament
- Long title: Loi n° 2006-64 du 23 janvier 2006 relative à la lutte contre le terrorisme et portant dispositions diverses relatives à la sécurité et aux contrôles frontaliers
- Citation: Law No. 2006-64
- Territorial extent: France and Overseas departments and territories of France
- Enacted by: National Assembly
- Enacted: 15 December 2005
- Enacted by: Senate
- Enacted: 22 December 2005
- Signed by: President Jacques Chirac
- Vetoed by: Group of Senators
- Vetoed: 23 December 2005
- Type of veto: Constitutional
- Holding: Constitutional Council Decision 2005-532 DC of 19 January 2006; Partial unconstitutionality in Article 6 (in part) and 19 (in whole)

Revising chamber: Senate
- Member(s) in charge: Nicolas Sarkozy
- First reading: 28 October 2005

Keywords
- counter-terrorism, national security
- Status: Amended

The Law on the fight against terrorism (French: Loi relative à la lutte contre le terrorisme), abbreviated LCT, is a 2006 French counter-terrorism legislation designed to improve state security and strengthen border control. The legislation was passed on 23 January 2006 under the leadership of Nicolas Sarkozy, then the Minister of the Interior. Notably the law increased punitive measures for criminal association and gave the government more power to access personal information online.

== Background ==
After the 2005 London bombings perpetrated by Islamic extremists, Sarkozy pushed to strengthen counter-terrorism measures in France. Sarkozy introduced the bill in the French Senate on 28 October 2005, saying that while France had never yielded to terrorist intimidation and never would, the rise in global terrorism necessitated change in policy.

== Legislation ==
The legislation amended several previous criminal codes, including the first French counter-terrorism law, introduced in 1986. The 2006 act particularly increased the breadth of government surveillance without judicial control.

- Police may access an individual's computer files without a warrant to prevent a terrorist act.
- Internet service providers and Internet cafes are required to retain login and connection data for one year and to provide this data to authorities if requested.
- Authorities may receive telephone and cell phone usage details, without the permission of a judge.
- The time a person can be held without charges was increased from four to six days in cases of "serious risk of imminent terrorist action in France or abroad."
- Increased CCTV surveillance in public
- Identity checks, including on board international trains, are strengthened.
- The Prime Minister or a person qualified in the Interior Ministry may authorize listening devices to record conversations.

== Criticisms ==
The law was criticized for encroaching on personal freedoms and liberties, in particular, accessing phone and Internet data without a signed warrant from a judicial authority. "Internet surveillance has now escaped from any legal proceedings to be placed under the direct control of the state," criticized Le Monde.

== See also ==
- French criminal law
- Terrorism in France
- Fiche "S"
