= Fichier des personnes recherchées =

Fichier des personnes recherchées (French pronunciation: [fiʃje de pɛʁsɔn ʁəʃɛʁʃe], "File of Wanted People"), or FPR, is a French database of criminals and wanted people run by the French Interior Ministry and used by the national police and other law enforcement agencies in France.

== About ==
The FPR began as a paper filing system in 1969, and it included criminals ranging from mafia members to escaped prisoners. The file is also consulted during applications for a national identity card, a passport, a residency card of a visa.

In 1995, the FPR was expanded to include missing people and abducted children.

Each file contains:

- identity of the person sought;
- physical description and photograph if available;
- reason for the search;
- instructions in case a wanted person is discovered.

The FPR contained 620,000 records as of 14 November 2018.

=== Cards ===
The FPR system includes 21 fiches — subfiles or cards that indicate additional special circumstances, such as:

- E card: wanted by immigration officials (police générale des étrangers)
- IT card: banned in French territory (interdiction du territoire)
- R card: residence in France forbidden (opposition à résidence en France)
- TE card: entry into France forbidden (opposition à l'entrée en France)
- AL card: mentally ill (aliénés)
- M card: underage runaways (mineurs fugueurs)
- V card: escaped criminals (évadés)
- S card: threat to national security (Sûreté de l'État)
- PJ card: wanted by judicial police (recherches de police judiciaire)
- T card: debtors to the national treasury (débiteurs envers le Trésor)

== See also ==
- Law enforcement in France
- Police and Judicial Co-operation in Criminal Matters
