= Posthumous marriage in France =

Marrying a dead person under French law

Posthumous marriage in France is legal but must be approved by several civil servants and the family of the deceased. France is one of the few countries in which it is legal to marry a partner posthumously.

== Origins ==
A few women were married by use of proxy to soldiers that had died weeks earlier. This practice came to be called posthumous marriage. Posthumous marriage for civilians originated in the 1950s, when a dam broke and killed 400 people in Fréjus, France, including a man named André Capra, who was engaged to Irène Jodart. Jodart pleaded with French President Charles de Gaulle to let her go along with her marriage plans even though her fiancé had died. She had support from the media and within months was allowed to marry her fiancé. It is likely that posthumous marriage (un mariage posthume) was made as an extension to France's proxy marriage.

== Legislation ==
Within months after the Fréjus dam tragedy, France's parliament drafted a law permitting posthumous marriage. Since then, hundreds of women have formally filed for what is known as postmortem matrimony. Posthumous marriage became legal in France by Article 171 of the civil code which states: "The President of the Republic may, for serious reasons, authorize the solemnization of marriage if one of the spouses died after completion of official formalities marking it unequivocal consent. In this case, the effects of marriage dated back to the day preceding the death of the husband. However, this marriage does not entail any right of intestate succession for the benefit of the surviving spouse and no matrimonial property is deemed to have existed between the spouses."

== Rules ==
Anyone in France who wants to file for posthumous marriage sends a request to the President of France, who forwards it to the Justice Minister, who forwards it to the prosecutor for the surviving member's district. If the couple had originally planned on getting married and the family of the deceased approves, the prosecutor sends the application back to the President. One out of every four applicants for posthumous marriage is rejected.

Examples of ways to legally show intent are for the man to have posted banns (official wedding announcements) at the local courthouse or written permission from a soldier's commanding officer.

Requests also include records that show a serious cause such as the birth of a child or the death of the fiancé.

Pregnancy alone or a letter to that promises marriage does not suffice, partly because such letters have a reputation for being illegitimate.

The marriage applies retroactively to the day before the deceased spouse died. Even if they were engaged and had published banns, a posthumous marriage will not necessarily happen, partly because living engaged couples can change their minds at the last minute. A posthumous marriage can also be thwarted by the testimony of a trustworthy individual. The judge's role is to make sure that the paperwork has been properly filled out. The judge cannot question the authority of the documents.

== Review of application ==
Article 171 of the Civil Code requires that application refers to serious reasons for posthumous marriage. The President of the Republic carefully considers the seriousness of the circumstances of the death.

== Ceremony ==
In France, a woman will often stand next to a picture of her deceased fiancé while the ceremony is taking place. The mayor conducting the ceremony will read the Presidential decree instead of the deceased man's marriage vows.

== Reasons ==
The primary reason for the posthumous marriage in France is to legitimize children that a woman might have. It is also done for emotional reasons.

In 2004, a spouse wrote a letter to The New York Times to let people know that they have the option of marrying their lost loved ones. She described the marriage as perfect and stated that “it remained in the spirit of a wedding”.

== Inheritance ==
The law does not permit the living spouse to receive any of the deceased spouse's property or money. No matrimonial property is considered to have existed between the two living spouses.

== Effects ==
After a posthumous marriage the living spouse inherently becomes a widow or widower. Posthumous marriage will also bring the surviving spouse into the family of the deceased spouse, which can create an alliance or moral satisfaction. The surviving spouse is also subject to impediments of marriage that result.

Posthumous marriage also shows the strength of an individual to overcome a fiancé's death. Article 171 specifically states that the usual financial aspects of a marriage, such as liquidation of matrimonial regime or the granting of intestate inheritance (meaning the laws governing inheritances of people whose spouses die without a will) do not apply. The widow can, however, receive a pension and can be entitled to insurance benefits.

== Notable posthumous marriages ==
- Étienne Cardiles married his civil partner, French National Police Captain Xavier Jugelé, on 30 May 2017, more than five weeks after the latter died in a terrorist attack on the Champs Élysées.
