= François Maurin =

French general (died 2018)

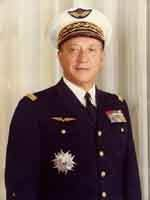
- Born: September 3, 1918; Paris, France
- Died: January 21, 2018 (aged 99); Paris, France
- Education: School of the Air
- Military career
- Allegiance: France
- Branch: French Air and Space Force
- Service years: 1938 – 1975
- Rank: Général d'armée aérienne
- Unit: Air force
- Commands: Chef d'État-Major des Armées
- Conflicts: Algerian War; WW II
- Awards: National Order du Mérite

François Maurin (died. 21 January 2018), was the Chief of Staff of the Armies in 1971 to until 1975.

François Maurin, a general of the French air was born 9 March 2018 and has recorded more than 8000 flight hours, he was enrolled in the Air School in 1938 having held many high position in the military service before taking over as CEMA in 1971.

== Awards and decorations ==
- Grand Cross of the Legion of Honor
- National Order du Mérite
- Croix de Guerre 39-45
- Croix de Guerre

Military offices
Preceded by Guy Méry	Chef d'État-Major des Armées; 1 July 1971 – 1 July 1975	Succeeded by Michel Fourquet
