= Michel Fourquet =

French general

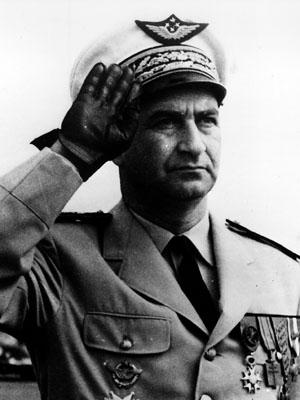
- Michel Fourquet
- Born: Michel Martin Leon Fourquet; 9 June 1914; Brussels, Belgium
- Died: November 20, 1992 (aged 78); France
- Education: Prytanée National Militaire
- Military career
- Allegiance: France
- Branch: French Air and Space Force
- Service years: 1940–1971
- Rank: Aerial General
- Unit: Free France
- Commands: C.E.M.A.; National Defence HQ; Commandant Forces Algeria; First Tactical Air Group 5th Air Region Algiers; Groupe Lorraine
- Conflicts: World War II; Algerian War
- Awards: Distinguish Flying Cross

Michel Martin Leon Fourquet (1914–20 November 1992), was a French soldier and administrator who served as the Chief of Staff of Armed Forces from 1968 to 1971.

Fourquet was born in Brussels and joined Free France in 1940. During World War II, he served with Groupe Lorraine on a unit attached to Royal Air Force together with Pierre Mendes-France. He was later an attaché in the French Fourth Republic cabinet and served as the spokesman and organiser of French nuclear energy. He commanded about 600,000 French soldiers in Algeria and oversaw the departure of French troops from Algeria in 1962.

== Commands ==
He commanded the First Tactical Air Group 5th Air Region Algiers in 1961 and rose to be Chief Commandant Forces Algeria in 1962 during the First Helicopter War. He was the Secretary General of National Defence until 1966 as permanent Under-Secretary for Armaments to 1968 and rose to the rank of general de Aerial in 1968 to be the Chief of Staff of Armed Forces.

== Personal life ==
He was married to Micheline Roger in 1939 and had five children.

== Awards Decorations ==
- Distinguished Flying Cross

Military offices
Preceded by Charles Ailleret	CEMA	Succeeded by François Maurin
