= Opération Sentinelle =

French anti-terrorism military operation

- Part of Vigipirate
- Location: France
- Planned by: Ministry of Armed Forces
- Objective: Dealing with the terrorist threat and protect the sensitive "points" on land
- Date: 12 January 2015 – present

Opération Sentinelle is an ongoing French military operation following the January 2015 Île-de-France attacks, with the objective of protecting sensitive "points" of the territory from terrorism. It was reinforced during the November 2015 Paris attacks, and was part of a state of emergency in France due to continued terror threats and attacks, until the state of emergency ended on 1 November 2017. On 13 October 2023, France raised its security alert to the highest level, and the day after it deployed 7,000 soldiers following the Arras school stabbing.

== Background ==
Opération Sentinelle began after the January 2015 Île-de-France attacks, and was reinforced following the November 2015 Paris attacks, attacks which were claimed to have been perpetrated by the Islamic extremist groups Al-Qaeda in the Arabian Peninsula and Islamic State of Iraq and the Levant. A number of other attacks have taken place in France since these attacks.

Other European countries have also deployed soldiers to protect certain areas due to terror threats or attacks, including in Belgium, Italy, and the United Kingdom.

== Number of troops deployed ==
Between 2015 and 2021, Opération Sentinelle saw nearly 225,000 personnel rotate through, with 95% of them serving in the Army.

The operation began with the mobilization of 10,412 soldiers by 15 January 2015 to guard 722 sensitive sites, including places of worship, schools, and diplomatic missions. These soldiers were joined by 4,700 police officers and Gendarmes to guard a total of 830 sites, with some under 24-hour guard.

These soldiers were rotated out starting 12 February, and the army decided to shift to mobile patrols in order to reduce the required number of soldiers, first to 7,500, then 3,000.

On 29 April 2015, the President of France announced the perpetuation of Opération Sentinelle with a planned 7,000 troops.

After the November 2015 Paris attacks, the strength of Sentinelle increased to 10,000 soldiers, with 6,500 deployed in Île-de-France and 3,500 in the rest of the country.

Due to the 2016 Nice truck attack, the reduction to 7,000 soldiers was cancelled. Instead, Sentinelle would be expanded by deploying a higher proportion of men to the provinces and patrolling large gatherings and borders more frequently.

As of September 2016, the force consisted of 7,500 mobilized soldiers, alongside 3,000 reservists on alert status. The distribution of forces varies depending on both risk and date, with more forces deployed in the provinces for the summer holidays. After the 2016 Berlin truck attack, 7,500 soldiers were mobilized in Paris to reinforce the 1,700 soldiers already present.

In 2021, the assigned force consisted of:

- 3,000 on permanent operational duty
- 4,000 on 12-hour or 72-hour alert
- 3,000 in strategic reserve.

== Attacks against soldiers ==
On at least six occasions, soldiers involved in the nationwide operation have themselves been targeted.

Soldiers deployed under Opération Sentinelle on 3 February 2017 blocked the assailant in the Louvre machete attack from entering the museum, where he claims to have intended to deface art with spray paint as a symbolic attack on France; he attacked the patrolling soldiers with a machete.

In the March 2017 Île-de-France attacks, two Opération Sentinelle soldiers at Orly Airport killed a man who said "I am here to die for Allah" while he beat to the floor another member of their team, a soldier from whom the attacker intended to steal her assault rifle.

On 9 August 2017 in the Levallois-Perret attack, six soldiers of the 35th Infantry Regiment participating in Opération Sentinelle were intentionally wounded by an automobile whose driver fled. The military were unable to make an armed response in time.

During the 2018 Strasbourg attack, the attacker exchanged fire with a patrol from Opération Sentinelle and was injured, but managed to escape.

== Criticism ==
=== Military Readiness ===
Some soldiers mobilized for Opération Sentinelle were housed in inadequate accommodation, like schools, town halls, or hangars.

In addition, some soldiers have had family issues due to being on duty for 186 to 220 days.

=== Attack on the Bataclan ===
During the Bataclan Theatre Massacre, eight soldiers under Opération Sentinelle arrived immediately after the first BAC officers. They refused to enter the building without orders or hand their FAMAS rifles to the BAC officers due to military regulations, so BAC 75N officers entered the building armed only with handguns. According to a 2016 parliamentary report, the police prefect of Paris did not solicit military aid, entrusting the intervention to BRI-BAC police officers, who are specially trained for hostage rescue and counterterrorism.

In June 2018, seventeen victims or families of victims filed a complaint against the state "for non-assistance to a person in danger". However, the Paris Administrative court rejected the complaint a month later.

== See also ==
- Operation Vigilant Guardian – Belgian equivalent
- Operation Temperer – British equivalent
- Sentinelle – 2021 Film
