= Paris police headquarters stabbing =

2019 stabbing in Paris, France

- Map of Île de la Cité
- Location: 48°51′14.4″N 2°20′48.8″E; Paris, France
- Date: 3 October 2019 c. 1:00 p.m.
- Target: Police employees
- Attack type: Mass stabbing
- Weapon: Ceramic knife
- Deaths: 5 (including the attacker)
- Injuries: 2
- Perpetrator: Mickaël Harpon
- Motive: Jihadism (Islamic terrorism)

On 3 October 2019, a police employee at the Paris police headquarters stabbed four of his colleagues to death and injured two others. He was shot dead by police at the scene.

== Attack ==
During the early afternoon on 3 October 2019, a police employee stabbed six colleagues at the Prefecture of Police on the Île de la Cité in central Paris, killing three police officers and one member of the support staff as well as injuring two others. Police opened fire, killing the attacker in the building's main courtyard. The attack came a day after police went on strike across France over increasing violence towards officers.

== Attacker ==
The attacker was reported as being 45-year-old Mickaël Harpon, an IT specialist who worked in the intelligence unit of the police headquarters for the last 16 years and held a security clearance, giving him access to restricted information like the watchlist of terror suspects, addresses of police officers and data on French citizens and their families who had returned after they fought in the Syrian Civil War. He was born in Fort-de-France in the Caribbean overseas department of Martinique in 1974, and had been deaf since childhood. The murder weapon was a ceramic knife of a type undetectable by metal scanners.

== Investigation ==
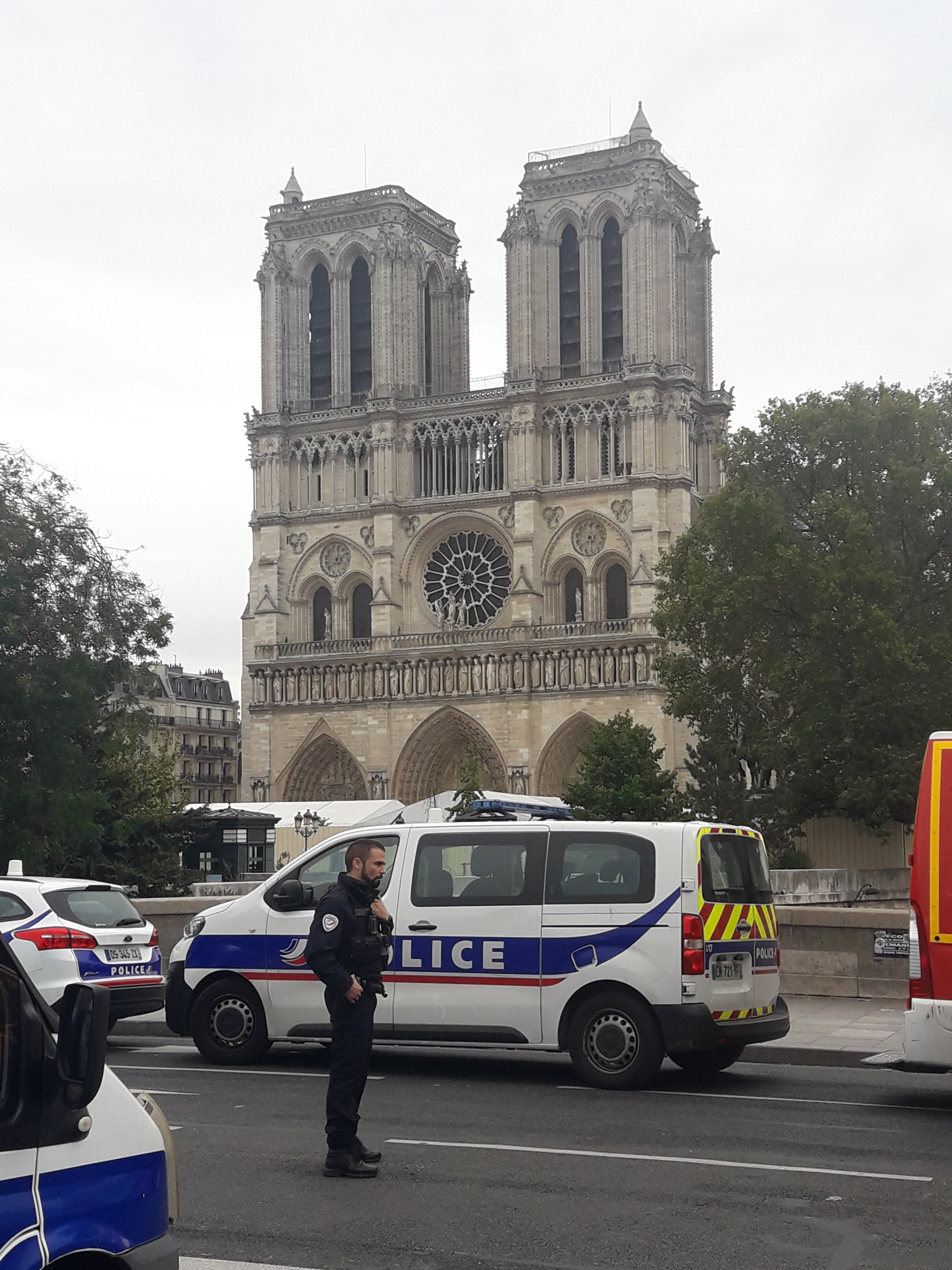
Île de la Cité was quickly locked down by police forces following the attack.

Initial reports suggested a workplace dispute was the motive. The day after the attack, a counter-terrorism investigation was opened, looking into whether the attacker was a radicalised Islamist and the possibility that he may have been in contact with or received support from any terrorist groups. The perpetrator had converted to Islam; according to Paris prosecutor Jean-François Ricard his conversion to Islam took place a decade prior. He attended mosque rituals twice a day. Colleagues had reported Harpon in 2015 for voicing support for the attack on Charlie Hebdo; nothing was done.

The counter-terrorism head said that the attacker had radical and extremist religious views, that started when he justified some violent acts with an Islamist background, stopped wearing Western clothes and to not talking to women excluding those of his family. Ties between Harpon and Salafist men were also confirmed. Before starting the attack, Harpon communicated with his wife, and they exchanged a total of 33 messages. Among those, Harpon wrote "Allah Akbar" and "Follow our much-loved Prophet Muhammad, and meditate on the Quran".

A USB flash drive was found at Harpon's office: propaganda material from the Islamic State of Iraq and the Levant, including beheading videos, and details of police officers who worked with him were found inside it. Officers investigated possible links with the 2016 Magnanville stabbing, in which two police officers were killed at their home by Larossi Abballa, an Islamist who pledged allegiance to the Islamic State. Investigation of Harpon's computer and phone revealed that he searched the internet for "how to kill infidels" shortly before the attack.

Five people linked to the attacker were arrested on 14 October 2019. Among those five was an imam listed in the Fiche S, a list of individuals deemed potential security threats.

France Inter reported in October 2019 that the investigators suspected that the attack was the result of a suicidal delirium, and that the ISIL videos on the USB drive found at Harpon's office belonged to his coworkers. In February 2020 Le Parisien reported that technical investigation of Harpon's private computer and cellphone confirmed that the attack was terrorist in nature and that sources close to the investigation described a "hybrid profile" of terrorism and psychiatric issues. Europol classified the attack as jihadist terrorism in their annual EU Terrorism Situation and Trend report (TE-SAT) released in June 2020.

== Political reaction ==
Following the incident, the police headquarters building was visited by President Emmanuel Macron, Prime Minister Édouard Philippe, Interior Minister Christophe Castaner and Paris Mayor Anne Hidalgo. The Île de la Cité was placed under a lockdown and the Cité station of the Paris Metro, located on the island, was closed to passengers. Minister of the Interior Christophe Castaner faced calls to resign, which he rejected.

Castaner received calls for his resignation from numerous prominent politicians from the entire spectrum from the extreme left to the extreme right. Castaner had said in a press conference that the attacker had never shown any conspicuous behaviour. A day after this statement, when it became public that his coworkers had filed a complaint and that there was no investigation, Castaner said there were "malfunctions" that failed to prevent the attack.
