= 2019 Lyon stabbings =

Mass stabbing in Lyon, France

- Location: Lyon, France
- Date: 31 August 2019
- Attack type: stabbing
- Weapon: knife
- Deaths: 1
- Injuries: 8

On 31 August 2019, nine people were stabbed by an Afghan asylum-seeker. One of the victims died, and two remain hospitalized. The attack happened outside a subway station in Lyon, France. The perpetrator told French police that he had heard voices that were insulting God. Several witnesses also recalled the attacker shouting religious words.

An intervening bus driver prevented the attacker from entering the metro, which stopped further carnage.

== Victims ==
A 19-year-old man was stabbed and killed and eight were wounded by the attacker.
