= Fiche S =

Indicator for flagging a suspicious person used by French law enforcement

In France, a fiche S (French pronunciation: [fiʃ ɛs]; English: S card) is an indicator used by law enforcement to flag an individual considered to be a serious threat to national security. The S stands for Sûreté de l'État ('state security'). It is the highest level of such a warning in France; it allows surveillance but is not cause for arrest. There have been some 400,000 individuals assigned a fiche S since 1969. These continue to include gangsters, prison escapees, ecoterrorists and Islamic extremists. Suspects flagged with fiche S have included those who have looked at jihadist websites or met radicals outside mosques, to those considered highly dangerous.

== About ==
The fiche S alert began in 1969 with the establishment of the national fugitive registry, the "Fichier des personnes recherchées" ("Wanted Persons File") or FPR, maintained by the Police Nationale. Approximately 400,000 people, from mafia members to escaped prisoners, were in the FPR at any given point. The fiche S in someone's file indicated a threat to national security.

Now a digital warning rather than a paper one, the presence of fiche S in the system symbolizes a warning to every law enforcement official or customs officer who accesses someone's file. The degree of severity ranges from level S01 to S15 (1 being the highest, 15 the lowest), degrees which indicate the measures law enforcement should take in dealing with the individual. The card is updated every two years. It is the highest warning possible without giving cause for arrest (or deportation in case of a foreign national), though it does permit surveillance, including wiretapping and placing GPS-tracking devices on cars.

The system is used by the Ministry of the Interior and Ministry of Defense to fight terrorism. There were an estimated 5,000 people with this status in 2012.

In 2015, the French Prime Minister Manuel Valls claimed there were 20,000 people in France tagged with a fiche S, including 10,500 suspected of being Islamic radicals.

== Notable individuals ==
Notable individuals who have been flagged with fiche S include:

- Yassin Salhi, the perpetrator of the June 2015 Saint-Quentin-Fallavier attack, in which he decapitated his boss. Salhi was flagged with a fiche S in 2006, but the alert was not renewed in 2008.
- Mohamed Merah, the perpetrator of the Toulouse and Montauban shootings in 2012, was given a fiche S in 2006.
- Amedy Coulibaly, the main suspect for the January 2015 Montrouge shooting, also had a fiche S that was not renewed.
- Sid Ahmed Ghlam, who was charged with the murder of Aurélie Châtelain and of plotting terrorist attacks on two churches.
- Ayoub El Khazzani, the suspect in an attempted mass shooting on a train that was foiled by passengers in August 2015, had a fiche S after the French were alerted by Spanish authorities that he was moving to France.
- Chérif Chekatt, the perpetrator of the 2018 Strasbourg attack, which he executed following a raid on his apartment.
- Raphaël Arnault, spokesperson of antifascist movement Jeune Garde Antifasciste and La France Insoumise candidate for the 2024 French legislative elections in Vaucluse's 1st constituency, who was flagged in the aftermath of violent confrontations against the Collectif Némésis in 2021

== Criticism ==
After the foiled train attack by Ayoub El Khazzani, the fiche S system was scrutinized by the French media, who asked why more was not done to prevent El Khazzani from moving freely around Europe. According to French Senator Nathalie Goulet, the "vast majority" of recent terrorist incidents in France were committed by those already tagged with a fiche S. Goulet, the chairwoman of France's Inquiry Commission into extremist jihad networks in France, said the system must either change so it is useful or be scrapped altogether. She said the system should be more similar to a permanent sex offender registry that has no expiration.

== See also ==
- Law on the fight against terrorism, 2006 French legislation
- Terrorism in France
