= 2019 Lyon bombing =

Terrorist attack in Lyon, France

- Part of Islamic terrorism in Europe
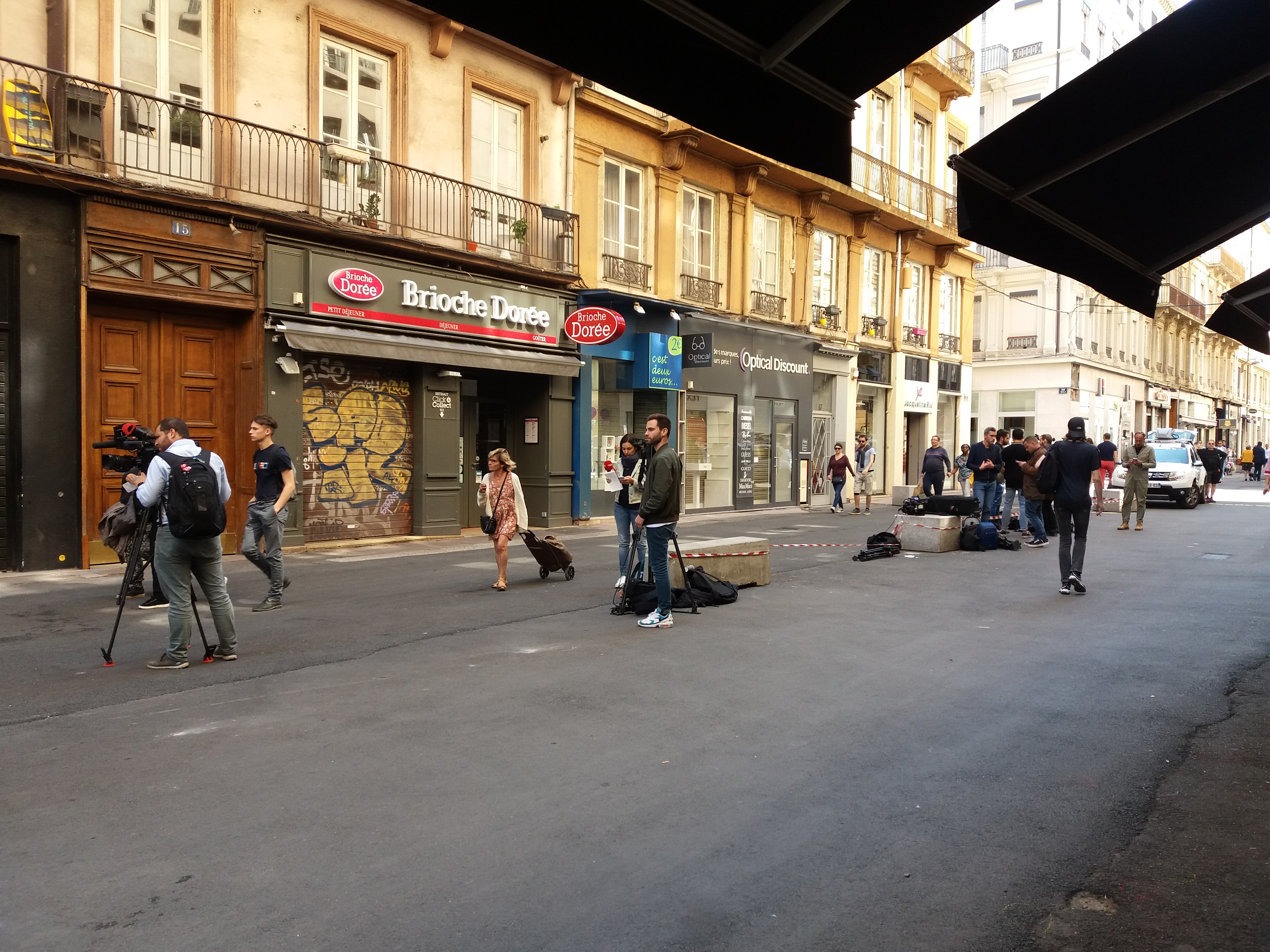
- Rue Victor Hugo the day after the attack

- Location: Rue Victor Hugo, Lyon, France
- Date: 24 May 2019; 17:30 (UTC+1)
- Target: Civilians
- Attack type: Bomb attack
- Weapon: Homemade bomb
- Deaths: 0
- Injuries: 14
- Perpetrator: Mohamed Hichem Medjoub
- Motive: Jihadism, Islamic extremism

The 2019 Lyon bombing took place on 24 May 2019 in Lyon, France. The bomb exploded near a bakery on a busy street and the blast wounded 14 people. Eleven victims were sent to hospitals. The youngest victim was an eight-year-old girl who suffered light injuries. Police authorities closed the nearby Victor Hugo and Bellecour metro stations.

== Investigation ==
Authorities opened an inquiry to investigate the incident as a terrorist attack. According to experts, the explosive used for the bomb was of a type which has been used in jihadist attacks in France such as the November 2015 Paris attacks.

=== Perpetrator ===
The perpetrator was arrested three days later at a bus stop in Lyon and he admitted to investigators that he carried out the bombing. On 20 May 2019, The New York Times reported that the bomber, named Mohamed Medjdoub, told investigators he had pledged allegiance to the Islamic State. According to interior minister Christophe Castaner, Medjdoub was previously unknown to security services. He was charged with attempted murder and multiple terrorist crimes. In April 2025, Medjdoub was sentenced to life in prison for the bombing.

== Aftermath ==
On 24 May 2019, president Emmanuel Macron expressed his sympathy for the victims.
