= Louvre machete attack =

2017 terrorist attack in Paris, France

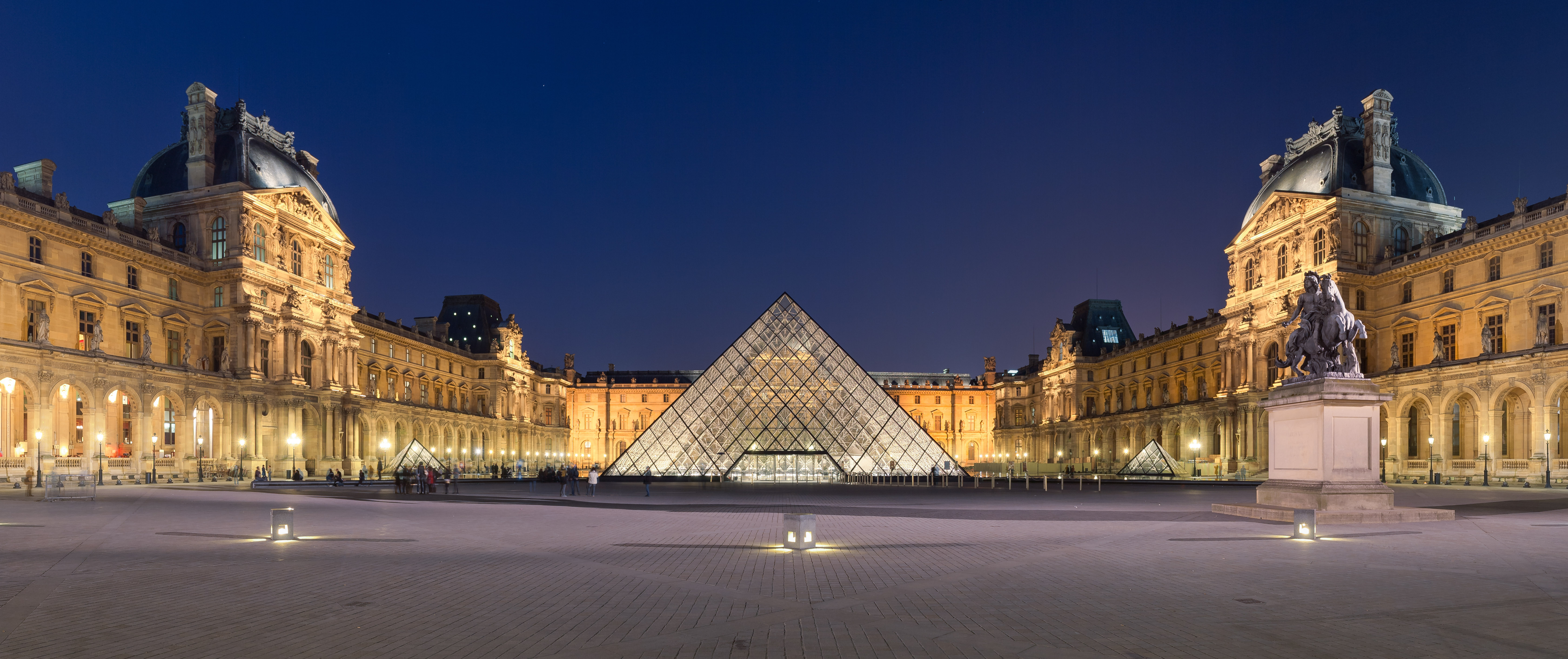
- Courtyard of the Louvre Museum with its pyramid
- Location: Paris, France
- Date: 3 February 2017
- Attack type: Knife attack; Terrorist attack
- Weapon: Machete
- Deaths: 0
- Injuries: 2 (including the attacker)
- Perpetrator: Abdullah Reda Refaie al-Hamahmy
- Motive: Islamic extremism

On 3 February 2017, an Egyptian national in France on a tourist visa was shot as he rushed a group of French soldiers guarding a principal entrance to the Louvre Museum in Paris, France, with a machete. One soldier was injured in the fight. The soldiers were patrolling the museum as part of Opération Sentinelle, guarding the Carrousel du Louvre, in which an underground shopping mall also serves as a gift shop, ticket sales office, and public entrance to the museum.

The attacker, identified as Abdullah al-Hamahmy, was confirmed by French authorities to have shouted "Allahu Akbar" during the attack, and although not having direct links, to have sympathised with and posted numerous messages on Twitter in support of the Islamic State, including calling for people to "fight in the cause of Allah and kill."

French President François Hollande announced the attack was terrorist in nature.

== Attack ==
The suspect, who was carrying two bags containing spray paint and two machetes, is alleged to have attacked and injured a soldier with a machete who was guarding the museum, shouting "Allahu Akbar". Another soldier on security patrol fired five shots at him, injuring him in the stomach. He was arrested and taken for medical treatment.

Immediately after his arrest, the suspect told authorities that he was carrying spray paint in order to deface the museum's artwork, an act that he regarded as a "symbolic" attack on France.

== Suspect ==
Anti-terror investigators dismissed the idea that the attacker was a "lone wolf", and believed he had been radicalized over a long time.

French authorities say that no group has claimed the attempted attack and no link to extremism was found during a search of the apartment. The suspect posted on his Twitter account in Arabic in the minutes before the failed attack in which he referred once to ISIL and also wrote, "In the name of Allah... for our brothers in Syria and fighters across the world".

The Egyptian Interior Ministry has identified the attacker as 29-year old Egyptian national Abdullah Reda al-Hamamy, an identity confirmed by the suspect, who had entered France on a one-month tourist visa issued in Dubai on 26 January. The French Public Minister, François Molins, confirmed the perpetrator was identified after a Visabio search. The suspect refused to speak in the first interview with investigators after being placed in detention at a hospital, but confirmed his identity in a subsequent interview. The suspect's father denied allegations of his son being a terrorist. However, investigators examining his social media accounts state that he has "sympathy for the ideas of ISIS".

Paris Match called the suspect "the tourist terrorist," and described an upwardly mobile professional, from a wealthy family, graduate of a prestigious university, with a seven-month-old son and a pregnant wife, staying in Paris for ten days at a prestigious address near the Champs-Elysées, sending home artsy selfies with Paris landmarks from his iPhone 7. Nonetheless, the magazine disclosed that the suspect was carrying "bombs of aerosol paint" intended to "disfigure the masterpieces of the [Louvre] museum".

In 2018, the press disclosed that the attacker's final message on Twitter was "No negotiation possible, no compromise, no ointment to pass, and certainly no return possible. There is no peace in war." He remained jailed at the Bois-d'Arcy prison.

On June 24, 2021, Abdallah El-Hamahmy was sentenced to 30 years in prison with a security period of 2/3 as well as a definitive ban from French territory. The representative of the National Anti-Terrorist Prosecutor's Office underlines the preparation of the attack from abroad and the persistence of El-Hamahmy's ideological adherence to Islamist theses.

== Aftermath ==
French President François Hollande "said there was 'no doubt' the attack was terrorist in nature". The attack heightened anxieties in a city already reeling from a spate of recent attacks, including the November 2015 Paris attacks. The city continues to increase security against terrorist attacks at major tourist attractions.

The attack exacerbated fears of further decline in tourism because approximately 70% of visitors to the Louvre are foreign nationals and attendance fell by 16% in 2001, due to the September 11 attacks in the US; were off 7.5% in 2015 after the November 2015 Paris attacks and fell a further 15% in 2016, in the wake of the Bastille Day attack. The attack was being investigated as a possible act of terrorism.

== See also ==
- 2017 Notre-Dame de Paris attack
- June 2017 Champs-Élysées car ramming attack
