= June 2017 Champs-Élysées car ramming attack =

Champs-Élysées car attack

2017 Champs-Élysées attack
- Part of Islamic terrorism in Europe
- Location: Champs-Élysées, Paris, France
- Date: 19 June 2017; 9 years ago 3:40pm
- Target: National Gendarmerie
- Attack type: Vehicle-ramming attack, attempted car bombing
- Weapons: Car, explosives
- Deaths: 1 (the attacker)
- Injuries: 0
- Perpetrator: Djaziri Adam Lotfi
- Motive: Islamic terrorism

On 19 June 2017, a car loaded with guns and explosives was rammed into a convoy of Gendarmerie vehicles on the Champs-Élysées in Paris, France. The driver, identified as Djaziri Adam Lotfi was killed as a detonation clouded the car in orange smoke. The attacker had been on terrorism watchlists for Islamic extremism since 2014, and pledged his allegiance to Islamic State leader Abu Bakr al-Baghdadi before the attack. In a letter to his family he stated that for years he had supported "the Mujahedeen who fight to save Islam and the Muslims," having practiced shooting "to prepare for jihad," and stated that the attack should be treated as a "martyrdom operation."

== Background ==
Police officers, gendarmes and soldiers providing security in France have also previously been targeted by jihadists, with at least twelve such targeted attacks on police and soldiers between 2012 and 2017. The attack came two months after another attack on the Champs-Élysées in April, in which three police officers and a tourist were shot by a man wielding an AK-47, killing one police officer. The Islamic State has encouraged the targeting of police and soldiers on the grounds that they represent the state. The attack is one of several Islamic State-inspired vehicle-ramming attacks on European cities. Le Monde reported that since January 2015, terrorist attacks in France have left 239 dead.

== Incident ==
At 3:40 pm local time in Paris a convoy of Gendarmerie vans was driving up the Champs-Élysées when a terrorist rammed his silver Renault Mégane sedan into the lead vehicle in the Gendarmerie convoy. The Renault immediately caught fire. The car contained an AK-47 assault rifle, handguns, a gas canister, as well as a quantity of explosives sufficient to "blow this car up." The attacker was killed by police and the incident came under counter-terrorism investigation. The Department of Interior stated that explosives had been found in his car. The French Minister of the Home Office, Gérard Collomb, spoke of a planned attack. The attacker was known by the police. A letter written by the perpetrator declaring his allegiance to the Islamic State was found inside the vehicle.

== Perpetrator ==
The attacker was identified as Djaziri (alt. Dzaziri) Adam Lotfi, 31, a resident of the northwestern Paris suburb of Argenteuil. He was a scion of a "Salafist family". The perpetrator had been included on the "S" file, i.e., was "an individual considered to be a serious threat to national security." The reason for his inclusion on the fiche S was his belonging to the "radical islamist movement". He was known by the police. Even though he was considered dangerous, he got a weapon license.

The attacker had obtained a legal permit to own a gun as a consequence of deliberate decision of French secret service which allowed him to keep his firearms in order not to arouse suspicion that he is being monitored. On the day following the attack, four relatives of the driver were taken into police custody.

On the day of the attack, the perpetrator mailed letters pledging his allegiance to Islamic State leader Abu Bakr al-Baghdadi.

At least two different photos of the perpetrator emerged in the Internet. On YouTube videos it showed a middle aged man, while on Kapitalis.com showed a man in his early twenties.

== Claim of responsibility ==
On 13 July 2017, the Islamic State claimed responsibility for the attack on a list of attacks it carried out during the holy month of Ramadan, including another failed bombing at Brussels Central Station on 20 June, the day after the Champs-Élysées attack.
