= April 2017 Champs-Élysées attack =

Champs-Élysées terrorist attack

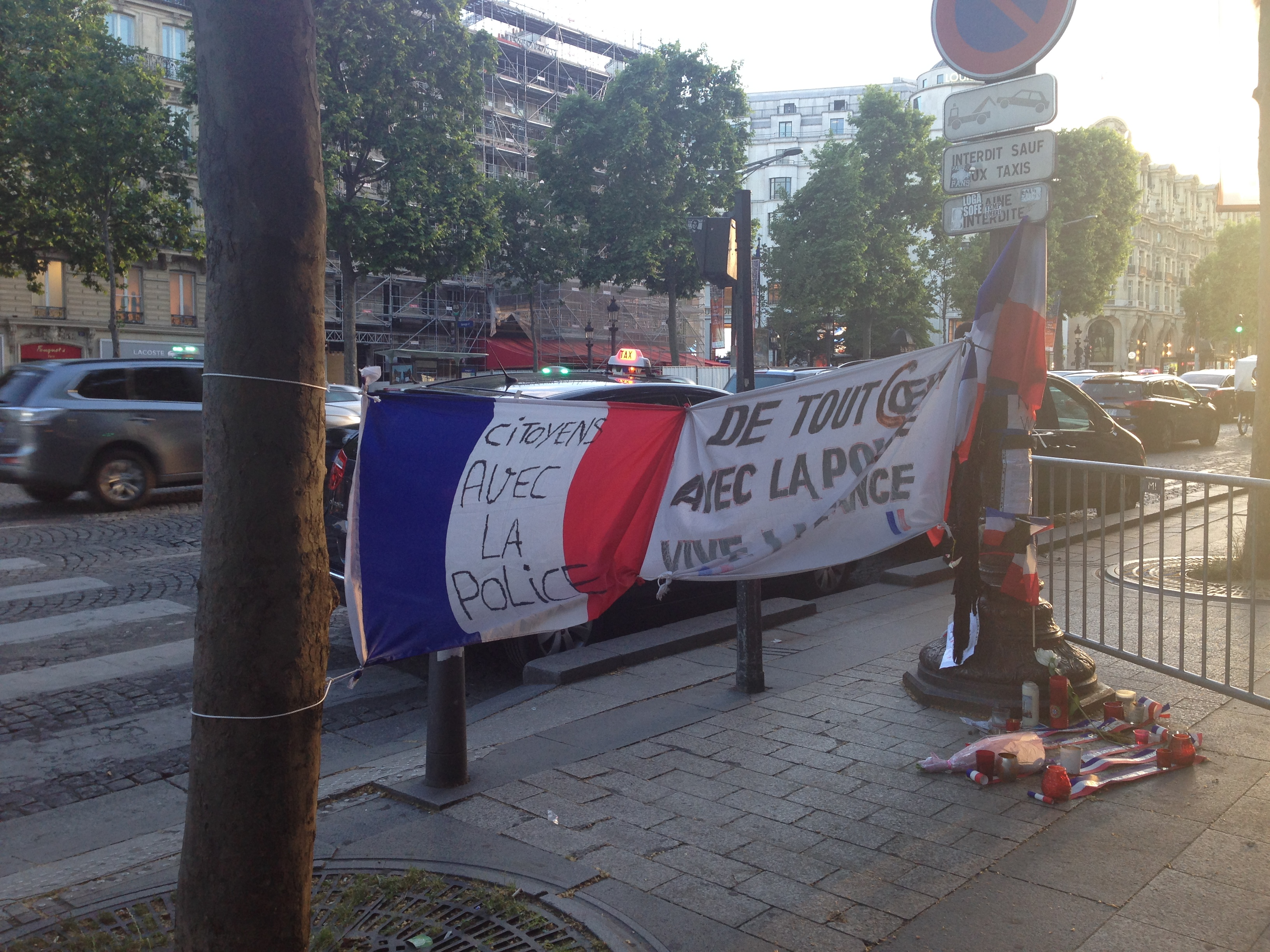
- Flags and candles in memory of the victims (2017)

- April 2017 Champs-Élysées attack (Paris) April 2017 Champs-Élysées attack (Île-de-France (region)) April 2017 Champs-Élysées attack (France) April 2017 Champs-Élysées attack (Europe)
- Location: 48°52′11″N 2°18′30″E; Paris, France
- Date: 20 April 2017; 20:47 (CET)
- Target: Police officers on the Champs-Élysées
- Attack type: Shooting, terrorist attack
- Weapon: AK-47 rifle
- Deaths: 2 (Jugelé and the perpetrator)
- Injuries: 3
- Assailant: Karim Cheurfi
- Motive: Islamic extremism

On 20 April 2017, three French National Police officers were shot by Karim Cheurfi, a French national wielding an AK-47 rifle on the Champs-Élysées boulevard in Paris. One officer, French National Police Captain Xavier Jugelé, was killed and two other French National Police officers and a German tourist were seriously wounded. Karim Cheurfi was then shot dead by police. Amaq News Agency, which is linked to the Islamic State of Iraq and Syria (ISIS), claimed the attacker was an ISIS fighter. French police and prosecutors are investigating the attack as terrorism, and have launched a counter-terrorism prosecution.

The attacker was identified as French national Karim Cheurfi, who had an extensive criminal record that included a conviction and a twelve-year prison sentence for an earlier attempt to murder two police officers. Police found a note praising ISIS, along with addresses of police stations, on his body. Because the attack took place immediately before the country's 2017 presidential election, media reports commented on its possible influence in the election's tone.

== Background ==
At the time of the shooting, France was on high alert in the wake of the attacks in Paris in November 2015 and in Nice in July 2016, as well as in anticipation of the first round of the 2017 presidential election, which was scheduled in three days. Since 2015, there had been a spate of Islamist terrorist attacks on French police officers, soldiers and civilians, resulting in the deaths of more than 230 people. Two men were arrested in Marseille two days before the shooting, for allegedly planning a terrorist attack.

The attack is understood as part of a shift in ISIS strategy towards encouraging untrained ISIS sympathizers to undertake attacks with crude weapons, caused by improved security in EU countries and by the loss of capacity to direct attacks from and train operatives in the Middle East as ISIS steadily lost territory in Syria.

== Shooting ==
At about 9:00 pm, Karim Cheurfi drove his vehicle next to a French National Police van. The French National Police officers were guarding the entrance of the Centre Culturel Anatolie, a Turkish cultural centre located at 102 Avenue des Champs-Elysées near the Franklin D. Roosevelt metro station and the Marks & Spencer store. Karim Cheurfi quickly got out of his car and started firing an AK-47 rifle into the van. Three officers were struck, one fatally. Cheurfi then attempted to flee on foot, firing at other people as he did, but was shot and killed by other responding officers. A female German tourist was also injured by "fragments from the shooting".

The Avenue des Champs-Elysées was closed down and civilians were evacuated. On social media, Paris police warned people to stay away from the area and said there was a "police intervention underway". Investigators initially said the incident may have been related to a robbery, but an anti-terror investigation was later launched. A pump-action shotgun, ammunition, two kitchen knives, and shears were found in the gunman's car. Amaq News Agency placed responsibility for the attack on the Islamic State.

=== Victims ===
The officer who was assassinated was 37-year-old Xavier Jugelé, who was murdered outright by two gunshot wounds to the head. He was one of the officers to respond to the Bataclan theatre during the massacre there in November 2015. Jugelé had been a member of the Paris police force since 2010, and was known as a gay rights activist and member of FLAG, the French association for LGBT police officers. He had been interviewed by the BBC in November 2016 when he visited the Bataclan when it reopened. He also served twice in Frontex to assist in the European migrant crisis in Greece. Jugelé was posthumously promoted to captain and awarded the knighthood of the Legion of Honor. He was eulogized by his civil partner Etienne Cardiles. President François Hollande, Emmanuel Macron and other dignitaries were at the national ceremony of honor which took place at the Paris Police Prefecture on 25 April 2017. Cardiles later attended the installation of President Emmanuel Macron at the president's invitation. Cardiles married Jugelé posthumously on 30 May.

One of the two surviving officers was critically wounded and said to be improving. Both were made knights of the National Order of Merit.

== Perpetrator ==
Amaq News Agency, which is linked to the Islamic State (ISIS), said the shooter was an ISIS fighter, giving his pseudonym as Abu Yusuf al-Beljiki. The claim suggested the attacker was from Belgium. News outlets commented that the timing of the claim was "unusually swift". French police identified the attacker as 39-year-old Karim Cheurfi, born in Livry-Gargan in 1977 and living in Chelles, east of Paris. French prosecutors said that a note praising ISIS fell out of his pocket after he was shot, and that he was carrying addresses of police stations.

At the time of the shooting, Cheurfi was already well known to the DGSI, France's domestic security service. He had an extensive criminal record for violent robberies and a shooting in 2001, in which he shot two police officers when they pulled him over. He wounded one of the officers after grabbing his gun while he was being questioned. He was convicted of attempted murder in 2005 and he was sentenced to twenty years in prison, which was later shortened to fifteen years. Despite a history of violence while behind bars, he was released in October 2015.

He had been detained in February 2017 for allegedly making threats to kill police, but was released due to lack of evidence. No evidence of radicalization was found, and he was never placed on a terror watch list. He was, however, added to a "radicalisation and terror prevention and alert list" created in the wake of the Charlie Hebdo shooting, but he was not considered a priority. CNN reported that a source close to the investigation said police had launched a counter-terrorism investigation in March 2017 after learning of his attempts to establish communication with an ISIS fighter. AFP reported that police were aware of an attempt by Cheurfi to buy weapons in early 2016, with the intent of using them to kill French police officers in retaliation for the deaths of children in the Syrian Civil War. His home in Chelles was searched after the attack.

Cheurfi's former lawyer said he was "extremely isolated" and a "psychologically fragile character" whose mental problems were not treated. He added that he never spoke about religion and talked mainly about "how to fill his daily life with video games". Cheurfi had visited Algeria sometime before the shooting, allegedly to get married. This was a breach of his parole, following which he was interviewed by the authorities, though a judge decided not to revoke his probation.

Following Cheurfi's identification, three members of his family were arrested in Chelles in the early morning of 21 April, although investigators believe Cheurfi acted alone and was inspired by ISIS but was not necessarily a member. In January 2018, his father, Salah Cheurfi, was sentenced to 18 months in prison for having made comments of support for terrorism.

== Reactions ==
=== Government ===
President François Hollande called for an emergency security meeting at the Élysée Palace. He later released a statement saying French police suspected the shooting was a terrorist attack. He also stated that the security forces are to handle the situation with "utmost vigilance" to ensure the security of the presidential election.

Following the shooting, US President Donald Trump expressed his condolences to the people of France and said, "[W]e have to be strong and we have to be vigilant." Trump later expressed his belief that the attack would have "a big effect" on the French presidential election.

Other world leaders, including Angela Merkel and the government of the United Kingdom, issued statements in reaction to the shooting.

=== French presidential election ===
As the attack happened three days before the first round of the French presidential election, three candidates ended campaign events early as "a mark of respect", with centre-right candidate François Fillon urging others to do the same. This was met with criticism from some other candidates like far-left candidate Jean-Luc Mélenchon, who said the violence should not interfere with the election process. The attack changed the tone of the campaign in its last days.

As the attack occurred during a televised debate among all eleven candidates in the election, fears arose that extremists were hoping to influence the debate's tone. With terrorism and security high priorities for Paris, The Guardian noted that the attack might serve as "ammunition" for right-wing candidates such as National Front leader Marine Le Pen, considered an outlier for her views on stronger border security and the deportation of radicalized foreigners, as well as Fillon.

Bernard Cazeneuve, the French Prime Minister, criticized Le Pen's and Fillon's responses. He accused Le Pen of trying to exploit the shooting for politics and attacked her for demanding further security measures. He explained that she had voted against the government efforts on security previously, referring to her party voting against an anti-terrorism law in 2014 and against beefing up of resources for French intelligence services in 2015. He criticized Fillon's record on security during his term as prime minister.

== See also ==
- June 2017 Champs-Élysées car ramming attack
