= List of major crimes in France (2000–present) =

This page presents, in a non-exhaustive manner, notorious or significant French criminal cases whose developments that have taken place since 2000. Types of crime include murders, rape, theft, kidnappings, sex crimes, assassinations, poisonings, drug crimes, war crimes, missing person cases, terrorism, high-profile criminal trials and miscellaneous organised crime.

== 21st century ==
=== 2000 – 2010 ===
==== Miscellaneous facts / Executions ====
Year	Department	Case	Summary	Convictions and comments
2000	Haute-Garonne	Disappearance of Suzanne Viguier	On 27 February 2000, Suzanne Viguier disappeared in Toulouse. Her husband was convicted and later released and acquitted.	Case unsolved as of 2025.
2000	Bas-Rhin	Jacques Plumain	On 15 May 2000, Ursula Brelowski was murdered in Strasbourg. She was stabbed twelve times in a forest. The killer was also responsible for two other murders in Germany.	Jacques Plumain was sentenced on 12 April 2006 to life imprisonment with a 20-year security period by the Haut-Rhin Assize Court.
2000	Gironde	Murder of Silja Trindler	On 5 August 2000, Silja Trindler, a young Swiss tourist was murdered in Carcans. She was suffocated on the ground on a beach dune.	Case unsolved as of 2025.
2000	Haute-Corse	Assassination of Jean-Michel Rossi	On 7 August 2000 in L'Île-Rousse, Jean-Michel Rossi, Corsican nationalist and one of the founders of the FLNC, was assassinated in a probable settling of scores.	Case unsolved as of 2025.
2000–2007	Manche	Céline Lesage case	Between 2000 and 2007 in Valognes, Céline Lesage killed six newborns of whom she was the mother.	Céline Lesage was sentenced to 15 years of criminal imprisonment on 18 March 2010, by the Manche Assize Court. The consequences are unknown.
2001	Hérault	Assassination of Christian Poucet	Assassination of Christian Poucet, president of the European CDCA, in the premises of his company, the CDCI, in Baillargueson 29 January 2001.	
2001	Pyrénées-Orientales	Murder of Fatima Idrahou	Fatima Idrahou, 23, was kidnapped and killed on 9 February 2001 by Marc Delpech, a bar owner in Perpignan.	
2001	Pas-de-Calais	Outreau case	Child sexual abuse. The case, which began in February 2001, will lead to the recognition of the innocence of the majority of the accused.	L'affaire, qui débouche sur un constat d'erreur judiciaire, donne l'occasion de souligner certains dysfonctionnements de la justice. Elle inspire notamment un film, sorti en 2011.
2001	Haute-Savoie	Murder of Magalie Part	Abduction of 19-year-old Magalie Part, on 26 March 2001. His body was found half-charred on the side of a forest path in Vulbens on 27 March.	Case unsolved as of 2025.
2001	Seine-Maritime	Alfred Petit	On 17 May 2001, Jean-Jacques Roussel was murdered and his wife was dismembered Danielle by Alfred Petit, a prisoner on the run, in Saint-Jacques-sur-Darnétal.	Alfred Petit's father, suspected of having dismembered Danielle Roussel, hanged himself on 15 January 2004. Alfred Petit also hanged himself in prison on 17 February 2009.
2001	Corse-du-Sud	Assassination of François Santoni	François Santoni, 41, politician, was assassinated with thirteen bullets on 17 August 2001 at a wedding in Monacia-d'Aullène.	
2001	Essonne, Val-de-Marne	Jean-Claude Bonnal	Four people wereshot dead on 6 October 2001 in Athis-Mons by Jean-Claude Bonnal. On 16 October 2001, two police officers were killed in Plessis-Trévise.	"The Chinese" Jean-Claude Bonnal was sentenced on appeal on 4 July 2007 to life imprisonment with a security period of 22 years by the Paris Assize Court.
2001	Pas-de-Calais	Murder of Éric Calers	On 2 November 2001, 40-year-old Éric Calers was shot dead in front of his home in Busnes.	A dismissal of the case was pronounced by the Pas-de-Calais Assize Court.
2001 – 2002	Hauts-de-Seine	Marc Machin-David Sagno case	On 1 December 2001, 45-year-old Marie-Agnès Bedot was raped and murdered under Pont de Neuilly. On 22 May 2002, Maria-Judith Araujo was also murdered.	David Sagno was sentenced at first instance on 23 February 2012 to 30 years of criminal imprisonment with a 20-year security period by the Hauts-de-Seine Assize Court. Marc Machin, initially convicted, was acquitted.
2002	Somme	Murder of Élodie Kulik	Rape, murder and incineration of Élodie Kulik on the night of 10–11 January 2002 in Tertry by several men.	On 1 July 2021, Willy Bardon was sentenced on appeal to 30 years in prison for gang rape, kidnapping and also the murder of Élodie Kulik by the Amiens Assizes.
2002	Alpes-Maritimes	Dubois-Gauvin affair	On 10 March 2002, 72-year-old Francine Raspini, a wealthy rentier, and her 48-year-old son Marc, were murdered in Nice by Philippe Dubois and his friend Patrick Gauvin and his son Laurent Gauvin.	Philippe Dubois was sentenced on 23 June 2006 at first instance to life imprisonment without a security period, Patrick Gauvin was sentenced at first instance to life imprisonment without a security period, Laurent Gauvin was sentenced at first instance to life imprisonment without a security period by the Alpes-Maritimes Assize Court.
2002	Somme	Jean-Paul Leconte	Jean-Paul Leconte raped and murdered 19-year-old Patricia Leclercq on 6 July 2002, before murdering 18-year-old Christelle Dubuisson on 21 August 2002.	Jean-Paul Leconte was sentenced on 5 February 2005 at first instance to life imprisonment without a security period by the Somme Assize Courts.
2002	Nord	Murder of Sophie Berkmans	On 7 October 2002, 41-year-old Sophie Berkmans, a rheumatologist, had her throat slit in her office in Valenciennes by Mohamed Medjahed.	Mohamed Medjahed was sentenced on 8 June 2011 at first instance to 30 years of criminal imprisonment with a 20-year security period by the Nord Assize Courts.
2002 and 2005	Paris, Hérault, Puy-de-Dôme, Allier	Lassana Coulibaly	Series of nine rapes preceded, accompanied or followed by torture or acts of barbarity, two attempted rapes and one aggravated sexual assault in Paris, Montpellier, Clermont-Ferrand and Vichy by Lassana Coulibaly, a homeless delinquent.	Lassana Coulibaly was sentenced on 23 May 2008 at first instance to 20 years of criminal imprisonment without a security period by the Puy-de-Dôme Assize Court.
2003	Pas-de-Calais	Murder of Monique Lejeune	On 7 February 2003, Monique Lejeune was murdered in Coulogne by Béatrice Matis, a former partner of her husband Claude.	Béatrice Matis was sentenced on appeal on 27 January 2012 to 15 years of criminal imprisonment without a security period by the Assizes of Nord.
2003	Pantin	Murder of Antoine Belmonte	Antoine Belmonte was killed on 22 February 2003 in Pantin in Seine-Saint-Denis with a gunshot through his door.	The case was solved in 2025. The victim was mistaken for a police officer of the same name who, in 1992, allegedly killed a 13-year-old boy on duty in a parking lot in Asnières .The alleged shooter admitted the crime.
2003	Paris	Francis Imbard affair	Assassination of Francis Imbard, 59-year-old nightclub and restaurant owner, on 26 February 2003, shot dead on his landing in the 16th arrondissement of Paris.	Case unsolved as of 2025.
2003	Bouches-du-Rhône	Poncé Gaudissard	On 31 March 2003, Chantal d'Amato, 53, a widow, and her daughter Audrey, 24, were murdered in their house in Meyrargues, throats slit by Poncé Gaudissard.	Poncé Gaudissard was sentenced on appeal on 19 March 2011 to life imprisonment with a security period of 22 years by the Var Assize Court.
2003	Haute-Savoie	Flactif family murders	On 11 April 2003, Xavier Flactif, his partner Graziella Ortolano and their three children were murdered by David Hotyat in Grand-Bornand.	David Hotyat was sentenced on 30 June 2006 to life imprisonment with a security period of 22 years by the Haute-Savoie Assize Court.
2003	Alpes-Maritimes	Murder of Christophe Dalmasso	Murder of Christophe Dalmasso, a 34-year-old wealthy heir, on 2 September 2003, in Nice by Edno Borba Da Silva, a Brazilian dancer and lover of his adopted daughter Lucie.	
2003	Pas-de-Calais	Vincent Humbert case	Death of Vincent Humbert, 19-year-old firefighter, who became quadriplegic, blind and mute, after a serious road accident in 2000. Following an injection of sodium pentobarbital given by his mother Marie Humbert with the help of a doctor, Dr. Chaussoy on 24 September 2003.	The case was dismissed in February 2006. The "Vincent Humbert law" was passed with the aim of decriminalizing the exception of medically assisted suicide in France. His mother died at the age of 63 following a long illness on 5 August 2018.
2004	Côte-d'Or	Murder of Valérie Bary	On 26 March 2004, 38-year-old Valérie Bary was murdered at her home in the hamlet of Laneau, in the commune of Arconcey, by her husband Laurent.	
2004	Bouches-du-Rhône	Murder of Ghofrane Haddaoui	On 19 October 2004, 23-year-old Ghofrane Haddaoui, a French woman of Tunisian origin, was stoned to death in Marseille.	Her stoning the day before, after a period of indifference, aroused indignation about the condition of young girls in working-class neighbourhoods in France. On 13 April 2007 the juvenile assize court of Bouches-du-Rhône sentenced the two young people aged 19 and 20 (minors at the time of the events) to 23 years of criminal imprisonment.
2004	Corrèze	Roland Bondonny	Commissioned assassination of hunter Marius Lac on 25 August 2004, following a case of animal poisoning.	Roland Bondonny committed suicide in prison after appealing his conviction.
2004	Yonne	Jean-Pierre Treiber case	Assassinations of Géraldine Giraud (daughter of actor Roland Giraud) and Katia Lherbier, on 1 November 2004 in Villeneuve-sur-Yonne. Jean-Pierre Treiber, the main suspect, after a fantastic escape, committed suicide before being tried.	The case is highly publicized, due to the celebrity of the father of one of the two victims and multiple twists and turns.
2004	Alpes-Maritimes	Jamila M'Barek	On 6 November 2004, Anthony Ashley-Cooper, 10th Earl of Shaftesbury was murdered in Cannes, by his brother-in-law Mohamed M'Barek.	
2004	Pyrénées-Atlantiques	Romain Dupuy	Murder of a nursing assistant and a nurse on the night of 17–18 December 2004 at the Pau psychiatric hospital by Romain Dupuy.	
2005	Seine-et-Marne	Murder of Maryse Louvet	Murder of Maryse Louvet in Mareuil-lès-Meaux on 15 January 2005, by his own daughter, Émilie, and her companion, Driss Sajdi.	Sajdi was previously sentenced to 20 years in prison for the murder of a young woman in 1991.
2005	Paris	Murders of Christelle and Lucas Leroy	20 February 2005: Murder and dismemberment of Christelle Leroy, 26, and her son Lucas, 5, by his employer and lover Bérenger Brouns.	
2005	Somme	Murder of Françoise Chabé	On 26 February 2005, Françoise Chabé was strangled at home in Humbercourt.	Ludovic, her husband, suspected of having killed her, is acquitted.
2005	Gard	Murder of Elodie Morel	Kidnapping, sequestration, acts of torture and barbarity, and murder of Élodie Morel, 29 years old, in Vergèze on 2 May 2005 by Guillaume Mingaud with the help of Richard and Francine Lignier.	
2005	Seine-et-Marne	Murder of Nelly Cremel	Murder of Nelly Cremel, 39 years old, in June 2005, near Reuil-en-Brie by Patrick Gateau and Serge Mathey.	The case, which involved a repeat offender and an accomplice, raised the question of conditional release, and was exploited politically by Nicolas Sarkozy, the future president of the French Republic.
2005	Essonne	Jean-Luc Cayez	Rape and murder of 24-year-old Audrey Jouannet on 13 September 2005, in Soisy-sur-Seine, by her caretaker Jean-Luc Cayez, a repeat rapist.	
2005	Rhône	Murder of Marine Boisseranc	On 11 October 2005, 20-year-old Marine Boisseranc, an accounting student, was stabbed 12 times in her parents' living room in Chazay-d'Azergues.	Case unsolved as of 2025.
2005	Hauts-de-Seine	Dominique Aubry case	Franck Renard-Payen and Olivier Eustache were prosecuted for murder, suspected of having disguised the death of Dominique Aubry as a suicide on 1 December 2005 on a barge in Neuilly-Neuilly-sur-Seine.	
2006	Hauts-de-Seine, Essonne	Murder of Ilan Halimi	Ilan Halimi, a young Jewish salesman, was kidnapped, then held captive and tortured for three weeks in an apartment and then a cellar in Bagneux. The victim succumbed to his injuries while being transferred to hospital after being released in Sainte-Geneviève-des-Bois . More than twenty people were involved.	L'affaire suscite une vive émotion, y compris au plus haut niveau de l'État, du fait de l'antisémitisme des auteurs du crime et des conditions de séquestration et de mort du jeune homme. Elle inspire un film, d'Alexandre Arcady, sorti en 2014.
2006	Corse-du-Sud	Assassination of Robert Feliciaggi	Robert Feliciaggi, 63, a Corsican politician, was shot dead in the parking lot of Ajaccio airport on 10 March 2006.	Dismissal rendered in July 2016.
2006	Côte-d'Or	Murder of Marcelle Bouvard	On 16 April 2006, 79-year-old Marcelle Bouvard was murdered in Ladoix-Serrigny by her great-nephew Geoffrey Perrin.	On 16 September 2009, Geoffrey Perrin was sentenced to 25 years in prison.
2007	Eure	Murder of Gaëlle Fosset	On 27 April 2007, 21-year-old Gaëlle Fosset, a student, was stabbed to death 66 times in her house in Saint-Germain-la-Campagne.	Case unsolved as of 2025.
2007	Hauts-de-Seine	Murder Brahim Déby	On 2 July 2007, Brahim Déby, son of Chadian president Idriss Déby, was murdered in Courbevoie.	
2007	Tarn-et-Garonne	Murder of Anne-Laure Urvoy	On 20 November 2007, Anne-Laure Urvoy a 27-year-old engineer at the Golfech nuclear power plant, beaten and strangled in her room by her partner Abderrazzak Zibha in Valence d'Agen.	Abderrazzak Zibha was sentenced to 27 years in prison.
2007	Oise	Murder of Anne-Lorraine Schmitt	On 25 November 2007 in Creil, 23-year-old Anne-Lorraine Schmitt, was found dead in an RER D after being stabbed by Thierry Devé-Oglou.	Thierry Devé-Oglou was sentenced on 15 December 2010 to life imprisonment with a 22-year security period by the Val d'Oise Assize Court.
2007	Pas-de-Calais	Murder of Laurence Maille	On 28 November 2007, 36-year-old Laurence Maille, was strangled by her companion John Szablewski in Farbus.	John Szablewski is sentenced in March 2011 to 30 years of criminal imprisonment with a 20-year security period by the Pas-de-Calais Assize Court.
2008 to 2016	Doubs	Frédéric Péchier case	Anesthesiologist Dr. Frédéric Péchier is suspected of having committed 24 poisonings on vulnerable people, including 9 fatal cases, using potassium chloride.	Facts revealed in March 2017 and May 2019, he claims his innocence despite the charges.
2008	Paris, Oise	Murder of Susanna Zetterberg	Kidnapping, sequestration and murder of Susanna Zetterberg, a 19-year-old Swedish waitress, on 18 April 2008 by Bruno Cholet, a repeat offender who posed as a taxi driver.	Hours after the abduction the body was found partly charred in the Chantilly forest.
2008	Bouches-du-Rhône	Patrick Salameh	Serial killer responsible for the disappearances and murders of numerous women in Marseille.	"The Marseille Ripper"
2008	Ain, Loire-Atlantique	Gérald Thomassin	Alleged murder of Catherine Burgod, 41, five and a half months pregnant, a municipal employee of Montréal-la-Cluse on 19 December 2008 by actor Gérald Thomassin.	Thomassin became the prime suspect, but he claimed his innocence. He disappeared on 29 August 2019 in Nantes on the day he was due to appear at the Lyon court to take part in the legal confrontation with the two other suspects in the case.
2009	Cher, Nièvre	Juillet-Rayé affair	Kidnapping and sequestration of Luc Amblard, 56, and his companion Guy Bordenave, 39, two show organizers, from their house in Couy on the night of 7–8 March 2009. They were buried alive on a bank of the Loire at La Charité-sur-Loire by Christophe Rayé and Claude Juillet, the brother-in-law of Guy Bordenave.	Christophe Rayé and Claude Juillet were sentenced to 30 years in prison.
2010	Saône-et-Loire	Murder of Bertrand Touchard	On 3 April 2010, Bertrand Touchard, a truck driver who was drugged, asphyxiated, beaten, strangled and then drowned by Nathalie Chatelot with the complicity of Claire Garcia. The body was discovered on 21 April 2010 in the waters of the Saône.	
2010–2018	Val-de-Marne, Pas-de-Calais, Nord, Seine-et-Marne, Val-d'Oise, Oise	Shooting of Aurélie Fouquet	Shooting of 26-year-old Aurélie Fouquet, a municipal police officer on 20 May 2010, in an armed attack on a convoy of funds by four hooded men (including the main suspect Rédoine Faïd) in Villiers-sur-Marne, robbery of an armoured van in Pas-de-Calais in 2011, ordered by Rédoine Faïd.	For the murder of Aurélie Fouquet, Faïd was sentenced, along with his accomplices, to 18 years in prison. For the robbery of an armored van in Pas-de-Calais in 2011, he was sentenced to 18 years in prison.
2010	Orne	Murder of Arnauld Ghys	Murder of Arnaud Ghys, a 28-year-old butcher in L'Aigle on the night of 9–10 July 2010. The shooting was commissioned by his partner Mélanie Fleury. He was shot in the back with a shotgun by Damien Rolland, her lover, an unemployed house painter.	
2010	Saône-et-Loire	Murder of Ghislaine Leclerc	Murder of Ghislaine Leclerc-Bouzaiene, 57, on the night of 26–27 August 2010, in the bedroom of her home in Volesvres , shot four times.	His son-in-law Sylvain Schrutt, once suspected, was acquitted.
2010	Bouches-du-Rhône	Murder of Christophe Lejard	Murder of Christophe Lejard who was shot in the back of the head on 24 November 2010.	The trial was adjourned on 18 May 2015 because his widow, Roseline Lejard, fell ill. On 26 June 2016 she was sentenced to 25 years in prison for ordering the murder of her husband. Arnaud Privat, her son from a previous relationship, received a 15-year prison sentence. He had acted as an intermediary between his mother and the murderer, a young resident of Nogent-le-Rotrou, to whom he had given the sum of € 15,000 to kill his father-in-law. Finally, Christopher Munsch, the shooter, was sentenced to 20 years in prison.
2010	Paris	Murder of Bernard Mazières	Murder of Bernard Mazières, a political journalist who had been retired for a year, by his adopted son and his friend Dany Manfoumbi on 24 December 2010.	His adopted son was sentenced to 13 years in prison for complicity. Dany Manfoumbi was sentenced to 20 years in prison.

==== Murders of minors ====
Year	Department	Case	Summary	Convictions and comments
2001	Moselle	Murder of Karine Schaaff	Rape, murder and incineration of 16-year-old Karine Schaaff on 22 July 2001in Bitche by Stéphane Krauth with the help of his partner Péroline Garino.	Stéphane Krauth was sentenced to life imprisonment and a 22-year security period. His wife, Péroline Garino, was sentenced to three years in prison.
2003	Haut-Rhin	Murder of Sophia Abid	Murder of 7-year-old Sophia Abid, in Brunstatt on 10 March 2003, asphyxiated by her mother Tania Parnisari.	Tania Parnisari was sentenced on 25 March 2008 to 18 years in prison at Strasbourg.
2004	Loire-Atlantique	Murder of Jonathan Coulom	Kidnapping of 10-year-old Jonathan Coulom on 7 April 2004 in Saint-Brevin-les-Pins.	His body was found, tied up and weighted down with a concrete block in a pond in Guérande on 19 May 2004. Martin Ney, a German serial killer, confessed in April 2018 in prison to having kidnapped and killed the little boy.
2004	Bas-Rhin	Pierre Bodein	Kidnapping, robbery and murder, accompanied by acts of torture, of two girls aged 9 and 14 and a 38-year-old woman in June 2004 by Pierre Bodein.	"Pierrot the Madman." First prisoner in France to be sentenced to life imprisonment.
2008	Ain	Murder of Valentin Crémault	Murder of Valentin Crémault, an 11-year-old, on the night of 28–29 July 2008, in Lagnieu, by Stéphane Moitoiret.	In November 2013, his partner Noëlla Hégo was acquitted of the charge of complicity in murder and was interned in a psychiatric hospital during the verdict of the appeal trial.
2009	Nord	Typhaine case	Infanticide of Typhaine Taton, 5 years old, in Aulnoye-Aymeries on 11 June 2009 by his mother Anne-Sophie Faucheur and her companion, Nicolas Willot.	
2009	Sarthe	Murder of Marina Sabatier	Infanticide of Marina Sabatier, 8 years old, in Écommoy on 6 August 2009 by his parents, Éric Sabatier and Virginie Darras.	Eric Sabatier died in prison four years after his trial. The French government condemned the ECHR for failing to protect children.
2010	Nord	Cottrez case	The bodies of eight newborn babies were found in a pavilion and a garden in the village of Villers-au-Tertre, killed by their mother Dominique Cottrez, a 45-year-old carer.	
2010	Territoire de Belfort	Murder of Pierre Nasica	In 2010, Pierre Nasica, 15, was stabbed to death in Belfort by his best friend, Yacine Sid.	Yacine Sid was sentenced to 20 years in prison because he confessed.
2026	Narbonne, Aude	Murder of Louis Hervé	In 2026, 17-year-old Louis Hervé was assaulted by a group of five young men.	

==== Attacks / Mass killings ====
Year	Department	Case	Summary	Convictions and comments
2001	Indre-et-Loire	Tours massacre	Shooting committed by Jean-Pierre Roux-Durraffourt which left four dead and seven injured on 29 October 2001 in Tours.	Jean-Pierre Roux-Durraffourt was sentenced to life imprisonment with a security period of 22 years.
2002	Hauts-de-Seine	Nanterre massacre	Massacre that claimed the lives of eight people, committed by Richard Durn on 27 March 2002, at the end of a municipal council meeting at the town hall of Nanterre.	Richard Durn committed suicide before his trial on 28 March 2002. While detained he jumped who his death at a police station.
2002	Paris	Maxime Brunerie	Attempted assassination of French president Jacques Chiracc on 24 July 2002, during the military parade on the Champs-Élysées.	Maxime Brunerie was sentenced on 11 December 2004 at first instance to 10 years of criminal imprisonment without a security period by the Paris Assize Court . He was released after 7 years of detention on 3 August 2009.

==== Other crimes ====
Year	Department	Case	Summary	Convictions and comments
2001	Alpes-Maritimes	Affaire Smet	Alleged rape of a former hostess, Marie-Christine Vo, on a yacht in Cannes in April 2001 by the famous singer Jean-Philippe Smet, alias Johnny Hallyday.	He was questioned by the courts as an assisting witness; he was never charged, and on the advice of the prosecution, which considered that "nothing could be proven in this case".
2003 – 2006	Ardèche, Isère et Drôme	The Green Mouse Gang	Numerous bank robberies and cash-in-transit vehicle robberies were committed. The perpetrators were Laurent Cocogne and Serge Quemin.	or "washing gang", first called "mechanics gang". Laurent Cocogne shot himself dead during his arrest.
2003 – 2009	La Réunion	Juliano Verbard	Juliano Verbard, founder and guru of the religious group Sorrowful and Immaculate Heart of Mary, considered a sect, was accused of sexual assault on minors, rape, kidnapping, hostage-taking, escape (by himself and followers of his sect). He escaped from the island by helicopter.	"Little Lily of Love"
2006	Hauts-de-Seine	Booba affair	The mother and brother of rapper Élie Yaffa were tied up and held captive by two individuals demanding €500,000 from him in Meudon on 13 February 2006.	

=== 2011–2020 ===
==== Crimes ====
Year	Department	Case	Summary	Convictions and comments
2011	Loire-Atlantique	Tony Meilhon	On 19 January 2011, 18-year-old Laetitia Perrais was murdered by Tony Meilhon in La Bernerie-en-Retz.	Tony Meilhon is sentenced on 5 June 2013, to life imprisonment with a security period of 22 years by the Loire-Atlantique Assize Court.
2011	Loire-Atlantique	Dupont de Ligonnès murders and disappearance	On 6 April 2011, the quintuple murder of members of the Dupont de Ligonnès family at their home, in Nantes.	The father, Xavier, disappeared on 15 April in Roquebrune-sur-Argens and immediately became the prime suspect. Case unsolved as of 2025.
2011	Haut-Rhin	Jean Meyer murder	On 27 April 2011, a trainee air traffic controller, Karim Ouali, is suspected of having fatally attacked Jean Meyer, head of the control tower at Basel-Mulhouse International Airport.	Investigators strongly suspect an attack, either on the control tower or by maliciously diverting aircraft to the airport. The suspect has rebuilt his life in Singapore, married with children. China is refusing his extradition for geopolitical reasons.
2011	Meurthe-et-Moselle	Murder on the A31	On 19 July 2011, Xavier Baligant returned from vacation and headed for Belgium. He stopped at the Malvaux rest area where he was later found riddled with bullets.	Case unsolved as of 2025.
2011	Var	Murder of Colette Deromme	On 14 April 2011 murder of 50-year-old Colette Deromme, who was strangled by her ex-sister-in-law, Sylviane Fabre in Lorgues.	Sylviane Fabre was sentenced on 24 January 2014, to 30 years of criminal imprisonment by the Var Assize Court.
2011–2012	Essonne	Serial murders in Essonne	From 27 November 2011 to 5 April 2012 in Juvisy-sur-Orge, four motiveless murders committed by Yoni Palmier, an unemployed transient and ultraviolent character.	Yoni Palmier was sentenced on 16 April 2015 to life imprisonment with a security period of 22 years by the Essonne Assize Court.
2011–2020	Vaucluse	Pelicot rape case	Around fifty people were accused of raping Gisèle Pelicot, who was drugged without her knowledge by her husband, Dominique Pelicot, who was also implicated.	Dominique Pelicot was sentenced to 20 years in prison in 2024. The 50 other defendants were also found guilty and received prison sentences.
2012	Loire	Murder of Philippe Gletty	On 27 February 2012 in La Terrasse-sur-Dorlay, Philippe Gletty was murdered by his accounting secretary and mistress, with one bullet in the back and two in the head.	Bettina Beau is sentenced on 23 May 2014 to 18 years of criminal imprisonment by the Loire Assizes.
2012–2013	Savoie	Ludivine Chambet	From September 2012 to November 2013 in Jacob-Bellecombette, Ludivine Chambet, a nursing assistant, poisoned ten elderly people in the EHPAD where she worked.	Ludivine Chambet was sentenced on 23 May 2017 to 25 years of criminal imprisonment by the Savoie Assize Court.
2012	Loiret	Jacqueline Sauvage case	On 10 September 2012, in La Selle-sur-le-Bied, Norbert Marot, 47, was murdered by his wife Jacqueline Sauvage at the family home. She killed him with three gunshots.	Victim of domestic violence, Jacqueline Sauvage is sentenced on 28 October 2014 to 10 years of criminal imprisonment by the Loiret Assize Court. She was pardoned by President François Hollande, and was released on 28 December 2016 after 4 years of detention.
2012	Isère	Murders of Kévin Noubissi and Sofiane Tadbirt	On 28 September 2012 in Échirolles, murders of Kévin Noubissi, aged 21, and Sofiane Tadbirt, aged 22, in a park in Échirolles.	On 23 December 2015, Ilyes Tafer and Youssef Camara were sentenced to 20 and 14 years of criminal imprisonment respectively by the Isère Assize Court.
2013	Loire-Atlantique	Barbot-Livet affair	On 15 March 2013, the murder of Anne Barbot née Blin, by her husband Didier and his mistress Stéphanie Livet in Vritz.	Didier Barbot was sentenced on 25 January 2016 to 30 years of criminal imprisonment, Stéphanie Livet to 25 years of criminal imprisonment by the Loire-Atlantique Assize Court.
2013	Pyrénées-Orientales	Disappearance of Allison and Marie-José Benitez	On 14 July 2013 in Perpignan , mysterious disappearance of 19-year-old Allison Benitez and her 55-year-old mother Marie-José.	Francisco Benitez, the husband and father and prime suspect, committed suicide on 5 August 2013.
2014	Alpes-Maritimes	Murder of Hélène Pastor	On 6 May 2014, murders of Hélène Pastor and her chauffeur, who were shot dead outside a hospital in Nice by a two-man commando commanded by her son-in-law Wojciech Janowski.	Wojciech Janowski was sentenced on 17 October 2018 to life imprisonment, Samine Ahmed to life imprisonment, Al Hair Hamamdi to life imprisonment by the Bouches-du-Rhône Assize Court.
2014	Haute-Garonne	Murder of Laurent Baca	On 5 August 2014 in Toulouse, murder of Laurent Baca, a 36-year-old temporary worker, killed by his partner Édith Scaravetti, a 26-year-old home help.	Édith Scaravetti was sentenced on 17 May 2019 to 10 years of criminal imprisonment by the Tarn-et-Garonne Assize Court.
2014	Vosges	Murder of Laëtitia Delecluse	On 2 September 2014 in Ramonchamp, disappearance and murder of Laëtitia Delécluse, a 38-year-old, mother of two children, by her partner Daniel Rudenko.	Daniel Rudenko was sentenced on 24 June 2017 to 20 years of criminal imprisonment by the Vosges Assizes.
2016	Ain	Disappearance of Anne-Charlotte Poncin	On 5 January 2016, Anne-Charlotte Poncin disappeared in Ambérieu-en-Bugey. Her skull and the remains of her body were found on 19 February 2023.	Her ex-partner, Margaux Olivier, is the prime suspect. Indicted in 2022, she confessed to seeing Anne-Charlotte die, having committed suicide with medication, and allegedly threw her body into a river. She was nevertheless released in 2024 and remains under investigation. Suicide and homicide are believed as possible explanations.
2016	Saône-et-Loire	Valérie Bacot case	On 13 March 2016 in La Clayette, Valérie Bacot, a victim of domestic violence, shot her husband Daniel Polette in the back of the head.	Valérie Bacot was sentenced on 25 June 2021 to 4 years in prison, including 1 year in prison, by the Saône-et-Loire Assize Court.
2016	Seine-Saint-Denis	Chaolin Zhang case	On 7 August 2016 in Aubervilliers, 49-year-old Chinese fashion designer Chaolin Zhang died after being violently attacked by three youths.	On youth was sentenced on 19 June 2018 to 10 years of criminal imprisonment, and another was sentenced to 4 years in prison by the Seine-Saint-Denis Assize Court Seine-Saint-Denis.
2016	Doubs	Murder of Narumi Kurosaki	On 4 December 2016 in Besançon, the disappearance and presumed murder of Narumi Kurosaki, a 21-year-old Japanese student.	Chilean national Nicolas Zepeda was sentenced on 12 April 2022 to 28 years of criminal imprisonment by the Doubs Assize Court. In 2025, a retrial was ordered.
2017	Loire-Atlantique, Finistère	Troadec family murders	On 17 February 2017 in Orvault, the Troadec family was murdered at their home by relative Hubert Caouissin. The dismembered body parts of the four family members were found two weeks later.	Hubert Caouissin was sentenced on 7 July 2021 to 30 years of criminal imprisonment by the Loire-Atlantique Assize Court.
2017	Paris	Killing of Sarah Halimi	On 4 April 2017 in Paris, the anti-Semitic murder of Sarah Halimi who was stabbed in her home by Kobili Traoré and thrown from a balcony.	Kobili Traoré was declared criminally irresponsible by the Paris Assize Court on 19 December 2019.
2017	Haute-Saône	Murder of Alexia Daval	On 28 October 2017 in Gray-la-Ville, murder of Alexia Daval by strangulation by her husband during an argument.	Jonathan Daval was sentenced on 21 November 2020 to 25 years of criminal imprisonment by the Haute-Saône Assize Court.
2017	Ariège	Case of the "Mirepoix missing persons"	On 30 November 2017, Christophe Orsaz and his daughter Célia disappeared. He was beaten with an iron bar and then thrown alive into a septic tank, and his 18-year-old daughter was killed by a shotgun bullet to the head.	In 2023, the Foix Assize Court sentenced ex-partner Marie-José Montesinos and her lover Jean-Paul Vidal to 30 years in prison for killing the father and daughter, who had fallen into an ambush.
2018	Paris	Murder of Mireille Knoll	On 23 March 2018, in Paris, the anti Semitic murder of Mireille Knoll, who was stabbed in her home.	Yacine Mihoub was sentenced to life imprisonment with a 22-year security period by the Paris Assize Court.
2018	Isère	Murder of Adrien Perez	On 29 July 2018 in Meylan, murder of Adrien Perez, killed with knives while he was helping a friend in the parking lot of a nightclub.	Yanis El Habib was sentenced on 21 June 2021 to 15 years of criminal imprisonment, Younès El Habib to 15 years of criminal imprisonment by the Isère Assize Court.
2018	Paris	Murder of Vanesa Campos	On 17 August 2018, in Paris, the murder of Vanesa Campos, a 36-year-old Peruvian undocumented transgender prostitute, after confronting a group of men armed with a revolver stolen from a police officer.	Mahmoud Kadri was sentenced on 30 January 2022 to 22 years of criminal imprisonment, Karim Ibrahim to 22 years of criminal imprisonment by the Paris Assize Court.
2018	Bas-Rhin	Murder of Sophie Le Tan	On 7 September 2018, Sophie Le Tan, a 20-year-old student, disappeared in Schiltigheim. Her dismembered body was found 13 months later in an Alsatian forest, in its skeletal state.	Jean-Marc Reiser was sentenced to life imprisonment with twenty-two years of security.
2018	Aude	Valérie Drif case	On 8 October 2018, Valérie Drif was murdered by her partner Laëtitia in Carcassonne. Firefighters intervened for a suicide by hanging, but the autopsy determined death by strangulation.	Laëtitia was then placed in pre-trial detention in the women's unit of the Perpignan remand center. She was then released from prison on 19 April 2019 and placed under judicial supervision but was not required to wear an electronic bracelet.
2019	Marne	Murder of Bastien Payet	On 10 March 2019 in Reims, murder of Bastien Payet, 23, former contesnetanr of Les Douze Coups de midi following a violent attack by three Reims students.	Investigation in progress.
2019	Landes	Murder of Johanna Blanes	On 7 July 2019 in Mont-de-Marsan, Johanna Blanes, 24, a mother of a 19-month-old child, was found dead in the Laspécès tunnel.	Hussein Ahmed was sentenced on 10 June 2022 to 30 years of criminal imprisonment with a security period of 22 years by the Landes Assizes.
2019	Oise	Roger Matassoli case	On 4 November 2019 in Agnetz, a priest, Roger Matassoli, was strangled and violently beaten by a young man whom he had sexually abused.	Alexandre V. was declared criminally irresponsible on 16 July 2021 by the Oise Assize Court.
2019	Aisne	Death of Elisa Pilarski	On 16 November 2019 in Villers-Cotterêts, 29-year-old Elisa Pilarski, six months pregnant, was found dead in the Retz forest with multiple dog bites.	Investigation in progress.
2020	Pyrénées-Atlantiques	Philippe Monguillot case	On 5 July 2020 in Bayonne, murder of Philippe Monguillot, a bus driver who was beaten to death after acosting four passengers who boarded without a ticket or a face mask.	Wyssem Manai est condamné le 21 septembre 2023 à 15 ans de réclusion criminelle, Maxime Guyennon à 13 ans de réclusion criminelle par les assises des Pyrénées-Atlantiques.
2020	Rhone	Axelle Dorier case	During a late-night party at Parc des Hauteurs in Lyon, on the night of 18–19 July 2020, an altercation caused a driver to panic and run away, in conflict with partygoers, and he fled for 809.5 meters, dragging Axelle Dorier, 23, into his path, trapped under his bumper.	

==== Murders of minors ====
Year	Department	Case	Summary	Convictions and comments
2011	Pyrénées-Atlantiques	Murder of Alexandre Junca	On 4 June 2011 in Pau, murder of Alexandre Junca, a 13-year-old schoolboy by a stranger. His body dismembered by four accomplices.	Mickaël Baehrel is sentenced on 16 June 2016, to life imprisonment by the Pyrénées-Atlantiques Assize Court.
2011	Gard	Murder of Océane Laforge	On 6 November 2011 in Bellegarde, Océane Luna, 8 years old, was abducted, raped and murdered by Nicolas Blondiau.	Nicolas Blondiau was sentenced on 17 February 2013, to life imprisonment without parole by the Gard Assize Court.
2011	Haute-Loire	Murder of Agnès Marin	On 16 November 2011 in Le Chambon-sur-Lignon, Agnès Marin, 13 years old, was raped and murdered by Mathieu Moulinas, 17 years old, a repeat offender.	Mathieu Moulinas was sentenced on 28 June 2013, to life imprisonment by the Haute-Loire Assize Court.
2012	Seine-Maritime	Murder of Alexandre Castaldo	On 27 March 2012, 17-year-old Alexandre Castaldo was shot twice in the neck and incinerated in a forest by four high school friends in Beauvoir-en-Lyons.	Anthony S. was sentenced on 30 May 2013 to 20 years of criminal imprisonment, Yohan L. to 18, Cyril L. to 16, Kévin S. to 15 years by the Seine-Maritime Assize Court.
2013	Puy-de-Dôme	Murder of Fiona Chafoulais	On 12 May 2013 in Clermont-Ferrand, 5-year-old Fiona Bourgeon, was murdered by her mother Cécile Bourgeon and her partner, Berkane Makhlouf.	Berkane Makhlouf was sentenced on 26 November 2016 to 20 years of criminal imprisonment by the Puy-de-Dôme Assize Court, Cécile Bourgeon was acquitted on 20 February 2019 by the Court of Cassation.
2015	Pas-de-Calais	Murder of Chloé Ansel	On 15 April 2015 in Calais, 9-year-old Chloé Ansel was raped and murdered in a forest, by Zbigniew Huminski, a Polish worker.	Zbigniew Huminski, the perpetrator, committed suicide before his trial on 14 May 2017.
2017	Isère	Murder of Maëlys de Araujo	On 27 August 2017 in Le Pont-de-Beauvoisin, Maëlys de Araujo, 8 years old, was kidnapped during a wedding ceremony and then killed by Nordahl Lelandais.	Nordahl Lelandais was sentenced to life imprisonment with a 22-year security term by the Isère Assize Court.
2018	Nord	Murder of Angelique Six	On 25 April 2018 in Wambrechies , kidnapping and sequestration, rape followed by murder of 13-year-old Angélique Six by David Ramault.	David Ramault was sentenced to life imprisonment with a 25-year security period by the Northern Assize Court.
2019	Oise	Murder of Shaïna Hansye	On 25 October 2019 in Creil , Shaïna Hansye, 15, already the victim of a gang rape in August 2017, was stabbed and burned alive by a 17-year-old boy with whom she was pregnant.	X was sentenced to 18 years of criminal imprisonment by the Oise juvenile court.

==== Attacks / Mass killings ====
Year	Department	Case	Summary	Convictions and comments
2012	Haute-Garonne, Tarn-et-Garonne	Toulouse and Montauban shootings	From 1 to 12 March 2012 in Toulouse and Montauban, a series of firearm attacks left seven dead and six injured.	Mohammed Merah, accused of the crime, was killed on 22 March 2012, by law enforcement before being convicted. His brother, Abdelkader, was sentenced on 18 April 2019, by the Paris Assize Court to 30 years of criminal imprisonment for criminal conspiracy, not for complicity in murder.
2012	Haute-Savoie	Tuerie de Chevaline	On 5 September 2012 in Chevaline , murder of three members of the same British family, a French cyclist is also shot dead.	Investigation ongoing. Case not solved as of 2025.
2013	Paris	2013 triple murder of Kurdish activists in Paris	On 10 January 2013 in Paris, the assassinations of three female Kurdish activists Sakine Cansiz, Fidan Doğan et Leyla Söylemez by Omer Güney, an MIT agent.	Omer Güney, the perpetrator, died in prison before his trial.
2013	Hauts-de-Seine	2013 La Défense attack	On 25 May 2013 in Nanterre, a knife attack against a French soldier, Cédric Cordier, by Alexandre Dhaussy.	Alexandre Dhaussy, the perpetrator of the acts, is declared criminally irresponsible.
2013	Paris	November 2013 Paris attacks	From 15 to 18 November 2013, a gunman targeted a newspaper, a television station and a bank in Paris.	Abdelhakim Dekhar, known for the 1994 Rey-Maupin affair., was sentenced on 25 November 2017 to 25 years of criminal imprisonment with a security period of 16 years by the Paris Assize Court.
2014	Nord	Thomas family murders	On 4 August 2014, Isabelle Thomas, a 49-year-old teacher, and her parents were murdered by her ex-partner Patrick Lemoine.	Patrick Lemoine committed suicide while in custody. The French state was found guilty of gross negligence in 2020.
2014	Côte-d'Or	2014 Dijon attack	On 21 December 2014, in Dijon, a motorist deliberately drove his vehicle into the Christmas market, injuring thirteen people.	The perpetrator is declared not criminally responsible.
2014	Loire-Atlantique	2014 Nantes attack	On 22 December 2014 in Nantes, Sébastien Sarron, 38, deliberately drove into the Christmas market and killed a 25-year-old man.	Sébastien Sarron, the perpetrator of the events, committed suicide on 13 April 2016 before his trial.
2015	Paris, Hauts-de-Seine, Seine-et-Marne	January 2015 Île-de-France attacks	From 7 to 9 January 2015 in Paris, a series of terrorist attacks, seventeen people were killed by Amedy Coulibaly, Chérif and Saïd Kouachi.	Chérif Kouachi, Saïd Kouachi, Amedy Coulibaly, the perpetrators of the acts, were killed on 9 January 2015 by the police.
2015	Alpes-de-Haute-Provence	Germanwings Flight 9525	On 24 March 2015, in Prads-Haute-Bléone, Andreas Lubitz, 27, co-pilot of an airliner, deliberately crashed his plane into a mountain range, causing the death of the 149 other people on board.	Andreas Lubitz died in the plane crash on 24 March 2015.
2015	Val-de-Marne	Sid Ahmed Ghlam case	On 19 April 2015 in Villejuif, Sid Ahmed Ghlam shot and killed 23-year-old Aurélie Chatelain, to steal her vehicle and subsequently commit terrorist attacks.	Sid Ahmed Ghlam was sentenced at first instance on 6 November 2020 to life imprisonment with a security period of 22 years by the Paris Assize Court.
2015	Isère	2015 Saint-Quentin-Fallavier attack	On 26 June 2015 in Saint-Quentin-Fallavier, Yassin Sahli beheaded his boss Hervé Cornara before attempting to blow up the factory where he worked.	Yassin Salhi, the perpetrator, committed suicide in prison before his trial on 22 December 2015.
2015	Pas-de-Calais	2015 Thalys train attack	On 21 August 2015 in Oignies, Ayoub El Khazzani attempted to carry out an attack on board a TGV train from Amsterdam to Paris.	Ayoub El Khazzani was sentenced on 17 December 2020 to life imprisonment with a security period of 22 years by the Paris Assize Court.
2015	Seine-Saint-Denis, Paris	November 2015 Paris attacks	On 13 November 2015 in Paris, a series of terrorist attacks left 130 dead and 354 injured.	Bilal Hadfi, Ammar al Sabaawi, Mohammad Al Mahmod, Brahim Abdeslam , committed suicide at the same time as their crime, Foued Mohamed-Aggad , Ismaël Omar Mostefaï and Samy Amimour were killed by law enforcement on 14 November 2015, Chakib Akrouh and Abdelhamid Abaaoud were killed by law enforcement on 18 November 2015. Salah Abdeslam was sentenced to life imprisonment without parole on 29 June 2022.
2016	Yvelines	2016 Magnanville stabbing	On 13 June 2016, in Magnanville, a couple of police officers were murdered. 42-year-old Jean-Baptiste Salvaing and 36-year-old Jessica Schneider, had their throats slit by Larossi Abballa at their home, in front of their young son.	Larossi Abballa was killed by law enforcement on 14 June 2016.
2016	Alpes-Maritimes	2016 Nice truck attack	On 14 July 2016 in Nice, Mohamed Lahouaiej-Bouhlel used a truck to commit a ramming attack on the Promenade des Anglais, killing 86 people and injuring 458.	Mohamed Lahouaiej-Bouhlel, the perpetrator, was killed by law enforcement on 14 July 2016. Eight other suspects were convicted of involvement.
2016	Seine-Maritime	2016 Normandy church attack	On 26 July 2016, in Saint-Étienne-du-Rouvray, Father Jacques Hamel, 86, had his throat cut in his church. Another parishioner was injured.	Adel Kermiche and Abdel Malik Petitjean are shot dead by law enforcement.
2016	Paris	Notre-Dame de Paris bombing attempt	On 4 September 2016 in Paris , an attempted car bomb attack against Notre-Dame Cathedral was carried out by a commando of jihadists.	Inès Madani was sentenced in the first instance on 14 October 2019, to 30 years of criminal imprisonment without a security period, Ornella Gilligmann to 25 years of criminal imprisonment without a security period, Sarah Hervouët to 20 years of criminal imprisonment without a security period, Amel Sakaou to 20 years of criminal imprisonment without a security period by the Paris Assizes.
2017	Paris	Louvre machete attack	On 3 February 2017 in Paris, a machete attack against soldiers, one of them was injured. The assailant was shot by police.	Abdallah El-Hamahmy was sentenced on 21 June 2021 to 30 years imprisonment with a mandatory minimum term of 20 years by the Paris Assize Court.
2017	Paris	Bomb package targeting the IMF in Paris	On 16 March 2017 in Paris, a booby-trapped package exploded at the International Monetary Fund building, one person was injured.	Investigation ongoing.
2017	Seine-Saint-Denis, Val-de-Marne	2017 Orly Airport attack	On 18 March 2017, at Orly Airport, a female soldier was taken hostage by Zyed Belgacem before being shot dead. Belgacem had wounded a police officer with a gunshot a few hours earlier during a traffic stop.	Zyed Belgacem, the perpetrator of the acts, was killed by law enforcement.
2017	Paris	April 2017 Champs-Élysées attack	On 20 April 2017 in Paris, a police officer was shot and killed on the Avenue des Champs-Élysées.	Karim Cheurfi, the perpetrator of the acts, was killed by law enforcement.
2017	Hauts-de-Seine	2017 Levallois-Perret attack	On 9 August 2017 in Levallois-Perret, five soldiers were injured during a car ramming attack perpetrated by Hamou Benlatrèche.	Hamou Benlatrèche was sentenced on 13 December 2021 to 30 years of criminal imprisonment with a security period of 20 years by the Paris Assize Courts.
2017	Bouches-du-Rhône	2017 Marseille stabbing	On 1 October 2017, in Marseille, a terrorist killed two young women (one with her throat slit, one with her abdomen cut open) on the steps of the Saint-Charles train station before being shot dead by soldiers.	Ahmed Hanachi is shot dead by law enforcement.
2018	Aude	Carcassonne and Trèbes attack	On 23 March 2018, in Carcassonne and Trèbes, a series of terrorist attacks left four dead and fifteen injured.	Radouane Lakdim was killed by law enforcement. Seven suspects faced court.
2018	Paris	2018 Paris knife attack	On 12 May 2018, in Paris, Khamzat Azimov killed a 29-year-old passerby, Ronan Gosnet, and four others were injured.	Khamzat Azimov was killed by law enforcement.
2018	Bas-Rhin	2018 Strasbourg attack	On 11 December 2018 in Strasbourg, a gun attack left four dead and twelve injured at the Christmas market.	Chériff Chekatt was killed by law enforcement and four men went o trial for involvement.
2019	Paris	February 2019 Paris fire	On 4 February 2019 in Paris, a criminally started fire left ten dead and ninety-six injured.	Essia Boularès was sentenced on 23 February 2023 to 25 years in prison.
2019	Orne	Condé-sur-Sarthe prison attack	On 5 March 2019 in Condé-sur-Sarthe, a radicalized prisoner, Michaël Chiolo, and his visiting partner took prison guards hostage.	The partner Hanane Aboulhana was killed by law enforcement.
2019	Rhône	2019 Lyon bombing	On 24 May 2019 in Lyon, a bomb attack injured 14 people on a busy street.	Four suspects were arrested.
2019	Paris	Paris police headquarters stabbing	On 3 October 2019 in Paris, a radicalized police officer killed four of his colleagues with a knife before being shot dead.	The assailant Michael Harpon was killed by law enforcement.
2019	Pyrénées-Atlantiques	Bayonne mosque shooting	On 28 October 2019 in Bayonne, an 84-year-old retiree attempted to carry out a bomb attack against a mosque.	Claude Sinké, the perpetrator of the acts, died in prison before his trial on 26 February 2020.
2020	Val-de-Marne	2020 Villejuif attack	On 3 January 2020 in Villejuif, a man attacked walkers with a knife in a park, killing one and injuring two others.	Nathan Chiason was killed by law enforcement.
2020	Drôme	2020 Romans-sur-Isère knife attack	On 4 April 2020 in Romans-sur-Isère, a Sudanese migrant attacked passers-by in the street, killing two and injuring five.	
2020	Hauts-de-Seine	2020 Colombes attack	On 27 April 2020 in Colombes, a radicalized man deliberately rammed two National Police motorcyclists, seriously injuring them.	
2020	Paris	2020 Paris stabbing attack	On 25 September 2020 in Paris, a Pakistani migrant attempted to kill two journalists with a knife in front of the Charlie Hebdo offices.	Zaheer Mahmood was sentenced to 30 years.
2020	Yvelines	Murder of Samuel Paty	On 16 October 2020 in Conflans-Sainte-Honorine, a middle school teacher, Samuel Paty, was beheaded by an Islamist terrorist for showing caricatures of Muhammad from Charlie Hebdo as part of a civic education lesson on freedom of expression.	The perpetrator, Abdoullakh Anzorov, was immediately shot dead by law enforcement. Eight suspects were charged with involvement.
2020	Alpes-Maritimes	2020 Nice stabbing	On 29 October 2020 in Nice, a man killed three worshippers with a knife during the attack on the Notre-Dame de Nice.	Brahim Aouissaoui was convicted and sentenced to life imprisonment in 2025.

==== Brawls / Police blunders ====
Year	Department	Case	Summary	Convictions and comments
2013	Paris	Killing of Clément Méric	The death, during a brawl, of a young far-left activist, Clément Méric, on 5 June 2013.	Esteban Morillo was sentenced in the first instance on 14 September 2018 to 11 years in prison, Samuel Dufour to 7 years in prison by the Paris Assize Court.
2014	Tarn	Killing of Rémi Fraisse	Death of Rémi Fraisse, a 21-year-old environmental activist, after an OF F1 grenade became lodged between his jacket and his backpack during violent clashes in Lisle-sur-Tarn.	The court ordered a dismissal of the case.
2015	Ille-et-Vilaine	Death of Babacar Gueye	Babacar Gueye was shot dead by a police officer on the night of 2 to 3 December 2015 in Rennes.	The court ordered a dismissal of the case.
2016	Val-d'Oise	Death of Adama Traoré	The suspicious death of Adama Traoré on 16 July 2016. He died in custody at the Persan gendarmerie following an arrest. His death received significant media attention following reports of police brutality in France and abroad.	The court ordered a dismissal of the case.
2017	Paris	Liu Shaoyao affair	Liu Shaoyao was shot dead by police during a raid on his home. This was the catalyst for the 2017 French riots.	The court ordered a dismissal of the case.
2017	Loir-et-Cher	Death of Angelo Garand	Angelo Garand was a man from the Traveller community in France who was shot dead at the age of 37 by the GIGN at his parents' home in Seur.	The court ordered a dismissal of the case.
2018	Bouches-du-Rhône	Death of Zineb Redouane	Death of Zineb Redouane, 80, who died after being struck by a tear gas grenade fired by a police officer at her window during a Yellow Vest protest in Marseille on 2 December 2018.	An officer was charged.
2019	Loire-Atlantique	Death of Steve Maia Caniço	Steve Maia Caniço, 24, drowned after a police intervention caused panic during the Fête de la Musique celebrations on the Président-Wilson Quay in Nantes. His body was found in the Loire River a month later.	Investigation in progress.
2020	Paris	Killing of Cédric Chouviat	Cédric Chouviat was tackled to the ground by police officers on the Quai Branly on 3 January 2020 and died.	Investigation in progress.
2020	Paris	Michel Zecler case	Rap producer Michel Zecler was the victim of a violent assault and racist insults from police officers in his studio, on 21 November 2020. This altercation received widespread media attention in France, thanks in particular to the release of surveillance camera footage.	Investigation in progress.

==== Other crimes ====
Year	Department	Case	Summary	Convictions and comments
2011	Calvados	Disappearance of Mathis Jouanneau	Disappearance of eight-year-old Mathis Jouanneau, on 4 September 2011. His father is the prime suspect in the kidnapping.	Sylvain Jouanneau was sentenced to twenty years in prison in June 2015.
2011	Morbihan	Lionel Floury affair	Lionel Floury was the victim of four assassination attempts orchestrated by his wife, Murielle Floury née Couret. With the complicity of her lover, Patrick Pluot, she used Jean-Sébastien Thomas, her daughter's boyfriend, as her henchman.	Murielle Couret was sentenced on 13 May 2014 in the first instance sentence of 20 years criminal imprisonment without a security period by the Morbihan Assize Court.
2011 - 2012	Savoy	The missing persons of Fort Tamié	Disappearance of Jean-Christophe Morin at the Fort de Tamié festival in 2011 and the disappearance of Ahmed Hamadou at the same festival the following year.	The remains of Ahmed Hamadou were found in 2023. Nordahl Lelandais is a suspect because he was at the festival at the time of the disappearances. The case remained unsolved as of 2025.
2012–2013	Bouches-du-Rhône	Yoan Gomis	Series of rapes, attempted rapes and sexual assaults in Marseille from 11 September 2012 and 2 February 2013.	Yoan Gomis was sentenced in the first instance on 10 September 2015 to 12 years of criminal imprisonment without a security period by the Bouches-du-Rhône Assize Court.
2014	Hauts-de-Seine	Nabilla Benattia case	Reality TV star Nabilla Benattia stabbed her partner Thomas Vergara in the chest on 7 November 2014 in Boulogne-Billancourt. The latter did not file a complaint.	Nabilla Benattia is convicted in the first instance on 19 May 2016 to 2 years in prison, including 6 months of mandatory imprisonment, by the Court in Nanterre.
2015	Gard	Disappearance of Lucas Tronche	The disappearance of 15-year-old Lucas Tronche on 18 March 2015 in Bagnols-sur-Cèze.	Case solved on 8 July 2021 when remains were discovered due to an apparent accidental fall.
2015	Ain	Turan Bekar case	Attempted assassination of Turan Bekar by his wife Ayten Yalcin.	Ayten Yalcin was convicted in the first instance on 28 June 2019. Her brother Engin Yalcin was sentenced to 16 years of criminal imprisonment without a security period by the Ain Assize Court.
2016–2022	Seine-Saint-Denis, Maroc	Jacques Bouthier case	In May 2022, Jacques Bouthier, the CEO of Assu 2000, was charged with "human trafficking" and "rape of a minor".	
2016	Gard	Disappearance of Antoine Zoia	Disappearance of 16-year-old Antoine Zoia on 1 March 2016. His body was found hanging from a tree in a forest near Clarensac on 27 September 2018.	
2020	Paris	French Bukkake case	Several officials from the pornographic video platform are being charged with "aggravated human trafficking, gang rape" and "aggravated pimping".	
2020	Tarn	Disappearance of Delphine Jubillar	Disappearance of Delphine Jubillar, a 33-year-old mother, during the night of 15 December 2020 in Cagnac-les-Mines.	On 17 October 2025, her husband Cédric Jubillar, was found guilty of murder and sentenced to 30 years' imprisonment.

=== 2021 – 2030 ===
==== Murders ====
Year	Department	Case	Summary	Convictions and comments
2021	Gironde	Murder of Chahinez Daoud	On 4 May 2021, in Mérignac, Chahinez Daoud, 31 years old, was the victim of a gun attack and then immolated by her husband.	Mounir Boutaa was sentenced on 28 March 2025 to life imprisonment with a minimum term of 22 years by the Gironde Assize Court.
2021	Marne	Rudy Carlin	On 27 May 2021 Rudy Carlin, 41, shot dead a student in a parking lot, and then abducted and raped the student's girlfriend.	Rudy Carlin was sentenced on 24 November 2023 to life imprisonment with a minimum term of 22 years by the Marne Assize Court.
2022	Corrèze	Murder of Justine Vayrac	On 23 October 2022 in Brive-la-Gaillarde, Justine Vayrac, a 20-year-old mother, was killed in the night as she was leaving a nightclub.	Suspect awaiting trial.
2022	Bouches-du-Rhône	Killing of Yvan Colonna	On 2 March 2022 in Arles, Franck Elong Abé, an inmate of the Arles central prison, fatally attacked Yvan Colonna, an inmate sentenced to life imprisonment.	An inmate was charged with murder.
2022	Deux-Sèvres et Vendée	Murders of Leslie Hoorelbeke and Kevin Trompat	Leslie Hoorelbeke and Kévin Trompat disappeared during the night of November 25-26, 2022, in Prahecq. After their abduction and confinement, their bodies were found in early March 2023 in Puyravault (Charente-Maritime). The autopsy revealed that their deaths were likely caused by blows inflicted with a blunt object.	Five suspects were taken into custody and then placed in pre-trial detention: Tom Trouillet, Nathan Badji, Enzo Challat, Stevan Mathieu and Mickael Zadi.
2023	Finistère	Murder of Héléna Cluyou	On 29 January 2023, in Brest, 20-year-old Héléna Cluyou, a student nurse, was found dead and partially burned.	Sylvain Legrand, 36, the main suspect, died in hospital on, 9 February 2023. The previous week, he had attempted to take his own life twice, after telling relatives that he had "done something stupid, that his life was over" and that "it was an accident". The case was closed.
2023	Pyrénées-Atlantiques	Murder of Agnès Lassalle	On 22 February 2023 in Saint-Jean-de-Luz, Agnès Lassalle, a 53-year-old Spanish teacher, was stabbed to death in the middle of class by one of her 16-year-old high school students.	The 16-year-old student at the Saint-Thomas d'Aquin high school in Saint-Jean-de-Luz confessed to the crime and was taken into custody. He reportedly spoke of a "little voice that spoke to him and suggested the previous day that he commit murder".
2023	Marne	Affaire Carène Mezino	On 22 May 2023 in Reims, Carène Mezino, a 37-year-old nurse, was murdered while performing her duties at the Reims University Hospital.	Franck Freyburger, 59, diagnosed as "paranoid schizophrenic", is being prosecuted for the murder.
2023	Gard	Murder of Sihem Belouahmia	Seem Belouahmia, an 18-year-old high school student, disappeared on 25 January 2023 near Alès. She was found dead on 2 February on a forest path, not far from where she disappeared.	Mahfoud H. is taken into custody. He confesses to having killed him during an argument in their romantic relationship.
2023	Paris	Claire Geronimi case	The rapes of Mathilde and then Claire Géronimi occurred in the same area (200m), in the heart of Paris in November 2023. Both rapes took place within an hour of each other. The victims had never seen each other until they filed a complaint.	The arrest and detention of the suspect from the Central African Republic reignited the debate on crimes committed by individuals under deportation orders. The trial was scheduled for September 2025.
2024	Nord	Murder of Philippe Coopman	Philippe Coopman, 22, was mistakenly murdered in Grande-Synthe , near Dunkirk, during an ambush set by teenagers aged 14 to 15 on the website Coco in April 2024.	Three minors are sentenced for murder to prison terms of 18 to 20 years with 5 to 7 years of socio-judicial supervision upon their release from prison.
2024	Paris	Murder of Philippine Le Noir de Carlan	Philippine Le Noir de Carlan, a 19-year-old student, was killed on 20 September 2024 in the Bois de Boulogne by Taha Oualidat.	The prime suspect, Taha Oualidat, is a Moroccan national under an OQTF (Obligation to Leave French Territory). He was arrested in Switzerland on 21 September 2024, and is currently being extradited for possible indictment on charges of rape followed by murder. The case has sparked numerous media and political reactions, particularly with questions about the monitoring of people convicted of rape, the removal of people subject to an OQTF, the legal criteria allowing the judge to extend the administrative detention of a foreigner in an irregular situation and the "double punishment ".
2024	Nord	Murder of Djamel Bendjaballah	Djamel Bendjaballah was repeatedly run over by Jérôme Décofour's car in Cappelle-la-Grande on 31 August 2024.	Jérôme Décofour, known to be an extreme right-wing activist and previously accused of having uttered racist insults against the victim .
2025	Nogent (Haute-Marne)	Affaire Mélanie	Mélanie G., a 31-year-old supervisor at the Françoise-Dolto middle school, was killed on 10 June 2025, by Quentin G., a 14-year-old student. The attack occurred around 8 a.m. during a bag check, in the presence of police officers, as part of the school security plan.	The alleged perpetrator, Quentin G., a 9th-grade student, was not known to the police. He had been suspended twice for disciplinary reasons, although he had also served as a bullying prevention officer. He stabbed Mélanie G. multiple times with a knife. The case has sent shockwaves through the education community and prompted political reactions, particularly regarding the normalization of bladed weapons in schools. President Emmanuel Macron, Prime Minister François Bayrou, and several teachers' unions have expressed their shock and anger. An investigation for voluntary homicide is underway.
2025	Choisy-le-Roi ( Val-de-Marne )	Bodies found in the Seine at Choisy-le-Roi	On 13 August 2025, four corpses were discovered in the Seine at Choisy-le-Roi in Val-de-Marne. All the victims were quickly identified. They were reported missing, one after the other, between 16 July and 11 August by relatives or acquaintances.	The investigation is ongoing. A suspect was charged on 24 August 2025 with serial murders, a rare occurrence in France.
2025	Buxerolles (Vienne)	Murder of Inès Mecellem	Inès Mecellem, 25, was murdered by her ex-partner Habib, a 35-year-old Afghan political refugee.	Having taken refuge with her mother in Poitiers (Vienne) since the summer of 2025, Inès Mecellem went to collect some belongings from her former apartment in Buxerolles (Vienne). Unbeknownst to her, her ex-partner had broken into the apartment. She was stabbed to death by him, and emergency services were unable to save her.

==== Child murders (2020s) ====
Year	Department	Case	Summary	Convictions and comments
2021	Val-d'Oise	Murder of Alisha Khalid	Assassination of Alisha Khalid by two of her schoolmates in Argenteuil.	Thirteen years in prison for his murderer, ten years for his accomplices
2022	Paris	Affaire Lola	On 14 October 2022, 12-year-old Lola Daviet disappeared in Paris. Her body was found in a trunk. The girl was killed by Dahbia Benkired.	Dahbia Benkired, a 24-year-old homeless Algerian national, subject to an OQTF, is charged with "murder linked to the rape of a 15-year-old minor, rape of a 15-year-old minor with acts of torture and barbarity and concealment of a corpse" and imprisoned . The case triggered strong political reactions due to the murderer's OQTF.
2022	Lot-et-Garonne	Affaire Vanesa	On 18 November 2022, 14-year-old Vanesa was abducted, raped, and killed while walking home from her PE class at school in Tonneins.	The main suspect, 31-year-old Romain Chevrel, was arrested, immediately confessed to the rape, and was charged with "kidnapping, unlawful confinement, rape and murder of a minor" and imprisoned. The case spread to Spain, Peru and Colombia, where relatives of his parents live.
2023	Drôme	Death of Thomas Perotto	On the night of November 18-19, 2023, 16-year-old Thomas Perotto died after being stabbed twice. Two other victims, aged 23 and 28, were in critical condition. The attackers injured approximately ten people in total.	The case caused a great political impact.
2023	Alpes-de-Haute-Provence	Death of Émile Soleil	On 8 July 2023, in Haut-Vernet, Émile Soleil disappeared while playing in his grandparents' garden. On 30 March 2024, his skull and some bones were found by a hiker not far from the hamlet where he lived.	Investigation ongoing; case unsolved in 2025.
2023	Bas-Rhin	Murder of Lina Delsarte	On 23 September 2023, 15-year-old Lina Delsarte disappeared while making her way between her home in Champenay and the Saint-Blaise-la-Roche train station, where she was to take a train to meet her partner in Strasbourg. Her body was found on 16 October 2024 in a wooded and isolated area in Sermoise-sur-Loire, in the Nièvre.	The main suspect, Samuel Gonin, committed suicide by hanging on 10 July 2024 in Besançon.
2024	Seine-Maritime	Murder of Celya	On 12 July 2024, Julien G., a 42-year-old drug addict, attacked his 6-year-old stepdaughter and slapped her to the ground. The mother intervened and was stabbed nine times. The suspect abducted Celya, and an Amber Alert was issued. The child's body was found the next day around 6 a.m., near the suspect's vehicle, and he was arrested. Celya's murder was extremely violent, with a "major fracture to the back of the skull.	Investigation in progress.
2025	Essonne	Murder of Louise Lassalle	On February 7, 2025, Louise Lassalle, an 11-year-old middle school student, disappeared in Épinay-sur-Orge while walking home from school. Her body was found the following morning in the Templars' Woods, near her home. Owen L., a 23-year-old neighbor, was quickly identified as the prime suspect. Known for a history of violence, particularly towards his sister, he confessed to the murder, stating that he acted in a fit of anger after losing a game of Fortnite. The case sparked outrage in France and reignited the debate about the influence of violent video games and child safety.	Four people were arrested.

==== Attacks / Mass killings ====
Year	Department	Case	Summary	Convictions and comments
2021	Yvelines	Rambouillet stabbing	On 23 April 2021, in Rambouillet, Stéphanie Monfermé, 49, a police officer, was murdered by Jamel Gorchene, 36, a Tunisian national who was granted legal status in 2019, while shouting "Allah akbar".	Jamel Gorchene, the perpetrator of the acts, was killed by law enforcement.
2022	Paris	2022 Paris shooting	On 23 December, in the 10th arrondissement of Paris, a shooting targeting Kurds left 3 people dead, including activist Emine Kara , and 4 wounded.	William Mallet, 69, was charged with murder, manslaughter, aggravated assault, and weapons offenses. He claimed to have acted out of racism.
2023	Arras (Pas-de-Calais)	2023 Arras school stabbing	A 20-year-old former student of the Gambetta-Carnot high school in Arras, flagged for radicalization, entered the school with a knife and fatally stabbed a teacher Dominique Bernard, wounding another and two maintenance workers. He was arrested by police. The assailant pledged allegiance to the terrorist group Islamic State.	The PNAT has taken up the case and opened an investigation.
2023	Paris	2023 Paris attack	On 2 December 2023, a man armed with a knife and a hammer attacked a group of tourists near the Pont de Bir-Hakeim in Paris, killing a German man before fleeing and attacking others, injuring two of them. The assailant was later apprehended by police using a stun gun.	
2024	Espinasse-Vozelle (Allier)	Mass killing in the Allier region	On July 13, a man opened fire at a birthday party, killing three people and critically injuring four others, before committing suicide. The perpetrator was a former soldier who lived a reclusive life.	
2024	Dunkerque	Quintuple murder near Dunkirk	Paul Domis, 22, committed a series of killings on December 14, 2024: he killed his former boss in Wormhout, then two former colleagues in Loon-Plage, as well as Iranian Kurdish migrants aged 20 and 28. The killer then drove off and surrendered to the gendarmerie in Ghyvelde.	Charged with assassinations and murders.
2025	Nantes	Massacre at a high school in Nantes	On 25 April 2025, a 16-year-old high school student attacked students with a knife in their classroom, killing one girl and injuring three other boys, one seriously. He was subdued by a school employee and then arrested. He is described as solitary, depressed, and suicidal. He wrote a manifesto before the attack, denouncing ecocide and societal alienation in a confused manner. He is also reportedly an admirer of Hitler and the nazis.	The suspect is committed to a psychiatric hospital.
2025	La Grand-Combe (Gard)	Killing of Aboubakar Cissé	On 25 April 2025, a 20-year-old man entered a mosque and, after a few minutes, fatally stabbed a worshipper 40 to 50 times. The victim was Aboubakar Cissé, a young Malian man in his twenties who volunteered at the mosque. The assailant filmed his victim's agony live and hurled Islamophobic insults. The public prosecutor's office is considering a racist and Islamophobic crime. The National Anti-Terrorist Prosecutor's Office (PNAT) is monitoring the case but has not taken it up; however, the French Council of the Muslim Faith denounced it as an "anti-Muslim terrorist attack ".	The suspect surrendered to the police.
2025	Puget-sur-Argens (Var)	Murder of Hichem Miraoui	On 31 May 2025, a 45-year-old man of Tunisian origin was shot dead in front of a hair salon in Puget-sur-Argens. The shooter, aged 53, was known for his racist and threatening remarks on social media. He regularly shared posts from figures of the National Rally (RN) such as Marine Le Pen, Jordan Bardella, and David Rachline, and called for people to vote for the RN in order to "kick out the immigrants." He has been charged with murder motivated by origin or religion, and with attempted murder, and the case is now being investigated by the National Anti-Terrorist Prosecutor's Office (PNAT).	

==== Other crimes ====
Year	Department(s)	Affair	Summary	Condemnations and comments
2021	Paris	Affaire Yuriy	On 15 January, in Paris, a 14-year-old boy, Yuriy, was violently beaten by around ten individuals.	Thirteen people sent for criminal trial.
2022	Creuse	Robert Hendy-Freegard case	On 26 August, in Vidaillat , two gendarmes were injured when Robert Hendy-Freegard, a British national convicted of deception, refused to comply .	
2023	Haute-Savoie	2023 Annecy stabbing	On 8 June, in Annecy, an individual stabbed six people, including four young children, in and around a playground .	Following his police custody, Abdelmasih Hannoun was charged with attempted murder.
2001 to 2021	Paris and Hérault	Olivier Vidal case	Between 2001 and 2021, Olivier Vidal was found guilty of aggravated rape of three young boys, sexual assault of five others, and corruption of minors involving twelve complainants. The events took place in Montpellier and Paris . During this period, he participated in film workshops with teenagers, spoke at summer camps, and introduced himself to Jewish and then evangelical families, as well as the entourage of young film enthusiasts.	Sentenced in April 2025. 16 years in prison, 7 years of socio-judicial monitoring, with 5 more years to be served, in the event of misconduct, and a permanent ban on any activity with minors, whether professional or voluntary .

== Bibliography ==
- Armand Fouquier, Causes célèbres de tous les peuples, Paris, Lebrun, 1858–1867. Livraisons 1–25, p. mult. Livraisons 26–50, p. mult. Livraisons 51–75, p. mult. Livraisons 76–100, p. mult. Livraisons 101–114, p. mult. Livraisons 115–139, p. mult. Affaires Armand et La Pommerais (« Les procès du jour », 1864), et de Épisode des journées de juin 1848 à l'affaire Castaing (No. 249), p. mult. En ligne sur Gallica.

== See also ==
- List of major crimes in France (before 1900)
- List of major crimes in France (1900–1999)
- List of major crimes in Ireland
- List of major crimes in Singapore (2020–present)
- List of major crimes in the United Kingdom
