= Chambet =

Chambet is a surname. Notable people with the surname include:

- Charles-Joseph Chambet (1792–1867), French bookseller, essayist, bibliophile and playwright
- Ludivine Chambet (born 1983), French serial killer
