= Murder of Johanna Blanes =

2019 murder in France

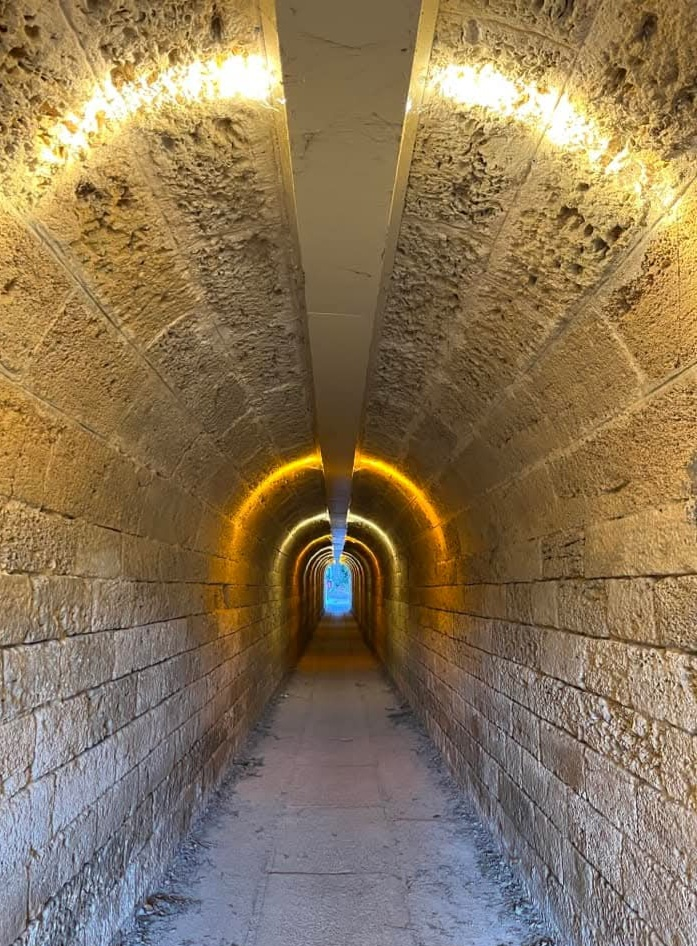
- Laspécès tunnel (after its 2021 renovation), site of the murder of Johanna Blanes in 2019
- Location: Mont-de-Marsan, France
- Date: 7 July 2019; AM (CET)
- Attack type: Rape and murder
- Injuries: asphyxiation
- Victim: Johanna Blanes
- Perpetrator: Hussein Ahmed
- Motive: Sexual

On 7 July 2019, Johanna Blanes, a 24-year-old French woman was murdered in a tunnel in Mont-de-Marsan, the capital of the French department of Landes. 32-year-old Hussein Ahmed was suspected and then convicted despite his denials of the murder and rape of Johanna Blanes. Hussein Ahmed was also convicted in a second trial for the repeated rapes of his wife over a six-year period.

== Murder ==
Johanna Blanes, originally from Toulouse under guardianship was the mother of a 19-month-old child. Her naked body was discovered in the Laspécès tunnel (Note: This tunnel connects Rue du Ruisseau in Mont-de-Marsan (Tuco district) to Rue George Stephenson in Saint-Pierre-du-Mont.) in Mont-de-Marsan on Sunday 7 July 2019 at 6 a.m. by a passer-by.

At 43-metres long, this pedestrian tunnel, located 470 metres of Mont-de-Marsan station and passing under the embankment of the railway line of the Morcenx to Bagnères-de-Bigorre line, is commonly used to travel on foot or by bicycle from Saint-Pierre-du-Mont to Mont-de-Marsan.

After spending the evening at the discothèque Le Paradise in Mont-de-Marsan, she sent a message to her partner at 4:40 a.m. that same day to indicate that she was returning to Saint-Pierre-du-Mont, where she had been staying for several years.

== Investigation ==
=== Determining the cause of death ===
A forensic examination followed by an autopsy of the victim's body was carried out by the Bordeaux Institute of Forensic Medicine on Monday 8 July. These tests help determine the cause of death by mechanical asphyxiation with major injuries to the neck and chest and traces of sexual violence. Genetic material was collected from the victim's body and from the crime scene.

=== Arrest of suspects ===
The Regional Directorate of the Judicial Police and the Departmental Director of Public Security for Landes have been jointly assigned to conduct the investigation under the direction of the Mont-de-Marsan Public Prosecutor's Office. The Public Prosecutor issued an appeal for witnesses on Monday 8 July in order to establish the victim's schedule and identify potential suspects.

From a technical standpoint, Johanna Blanes's cell phone was not found at the crime scene by investigators. Forensic science determined that it had been tampered with a few hours after her death by the insertion of a SIM card. The number associated with this SIM card led to the name of a suspect already known to the police. DNA found on the young woman's body and at the crime scene, already registered in the national automated genetic fingerprint database, led to the same suspect, who was subsequently arrested on 11 July at 9:45 am in Mont-de-Marsan.

The suspect was named as Hussein Ahmed, a 32-year-old Syrian at the time of the events, who had been living in the Landes region since 2016, when he arrived in France with his wife and had been granted political refugee status. His home in Saint-Pierre-du-Mont was searched, during which the victim's mobile phone was found. Johanna Blanes's mobile phone SIM card was found on the suspect at the time of his arrest.

Three other people living in the same residence as the suspect were first checked for identity and then also taken into custody on the same 11 July. before being cleared of wrongdoing and released. The suspect, meanwhile, is placed inpre-trial detention. The acts he is accused of are legally classified as murder preceded, accompanied or followed by another crime, in this case rape.

=== Press conference ===
On 12 July, Public Prosecutor Olivier Janson held a press conference, as permitted by law, provided the presumption of innocence of the suspect and the confidentiality of the investigation are respected. This media appearance was motivated by the need to keep the public informed of the progress of the ongoing proceedings in the local context of the Fêtes de la Madeleine, which began a few days later and brought together several hundred thousand people over five days, in order to maintain public order. Furthermore, information that should have remained confidential within the framework of the investigation, but which was leaked to the press, required a denial to prevent the spread of rumours that could lead to a public disturbance, which also constitutes a case provided for by law authorizing the prosecutor to communicate on an ongoing investigation.

== The accused ==
=== Medical history ===
At the time of his arrest, the suspect was already known to the police for domestic violence offenses. This began in March 2018 when a report was filed at the Mont-de-Marsan police station by his wife, which triggered the opening of an investigation for domestic violence the very next day. At the conclusion of the investigation in mid-March, the suspect was sent to trial in criminal court (Tribunal correctionnel). The woman and children were removed from the home and placed under increased protection in light of the allegations, a situation that remained in effect at the time of the investigation into Johanna Blanes' murder. The suspect was tried for domestic violence in early 2019 and sentenced to eight months' imprisonment, suspended with probation (he had no prior convictions at that time). This judgment was appealed, so the suspect's criminal record remained clean as of July 2019, as the facts had not been retried at that time by the Court of Appeal.

=== Trials and convictions ===
==== Rape and murder of Johanna Blanes ====
Regarding the rape and murder of Johanna Blanes, the defendant always denied the charges against him. During the trial, the defence argued for acquittal, while the prosecutor requested a life sentence with a minimum term of 22 years, describing the accused as a "psychopath and pathological liar" and referring to it as a "barbaric murder". On 10 June 2022, the Landes Assize Court sentenced Hussein Ahmed to 30 years of criminal imprisonment with a security period of 22 years.

==== Rape of minor spouse ====
On 24 May 2024, Hussein Ahmed appeared again before the judges in a closed hearing to answer for rapes committed over six years against his wife, who was eleven years old at the time of the first incidents on the very day of their wedding. Found guilty, he received a sentence of fifteen years' imprisonment, a sentence which, under French law, is identical to that already handed down in the Johanna Blanes case.

== Tunnel ==
The Laspécès tunnel was closed to the public following the murder for the purposes of the investigation. Johanna Blanes' friends organised a silent march in her memory, in agreement with her family. It was held on 7 September 2019, and followed the last route taken by the victim, from the Paradise nightclub to the tunnel where her body was found. After cleaning and renovation work on the structure and its surroundings (interior lighting, CCTV), the Laspécès tunnel reopened to the public on 7 December 2021.

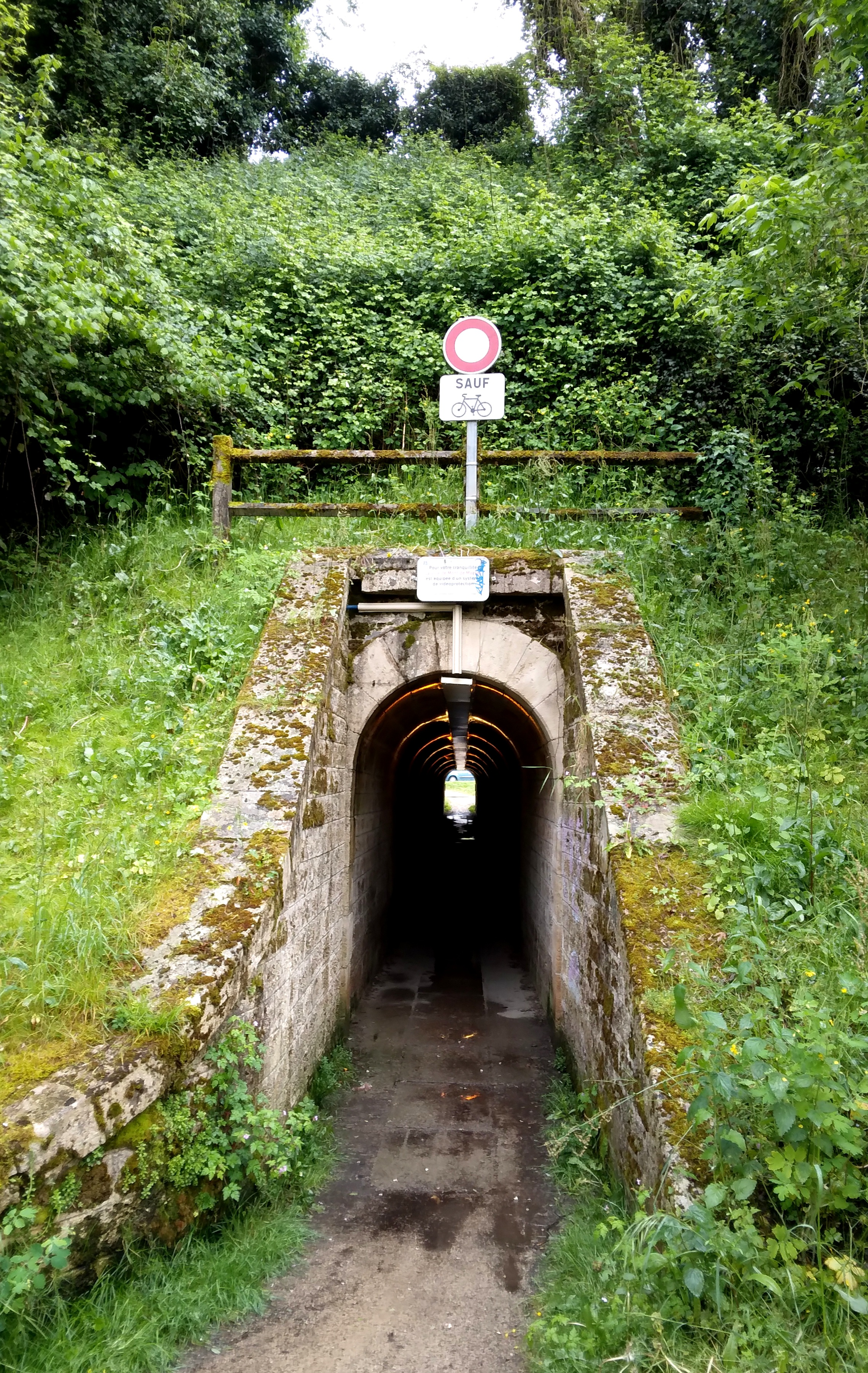
Laspécès tunnel, entrance on the Mont-de-Marsan side.

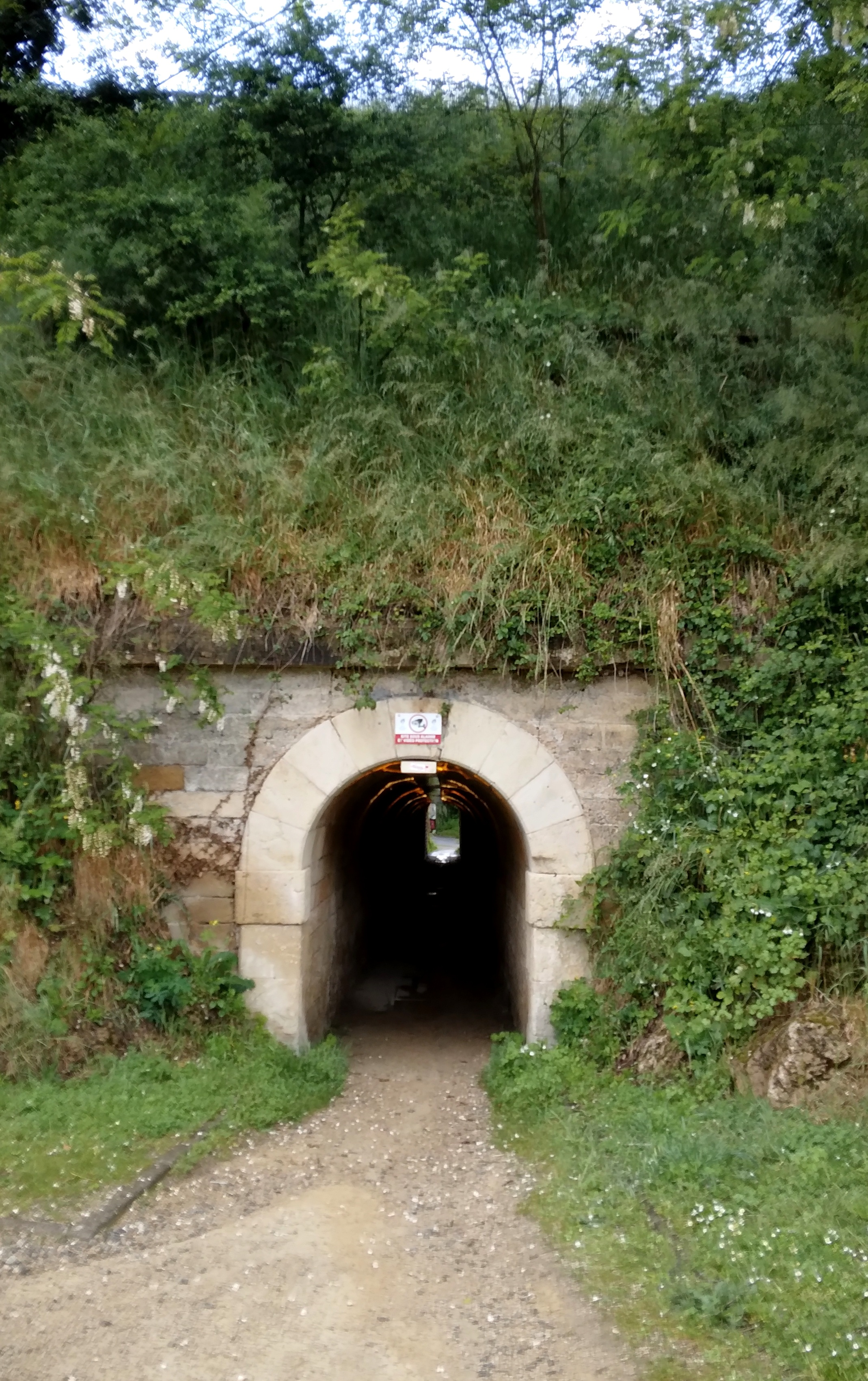
Entrance on the Saint-Pierre-du-Mont side.

== See also ==
=== Other crimes ===
- List of major crimes in France (2000–present)

=== External links ===
- Meurtre de Johanna Blanes : conférence de presse du procureur de la République Olivier Janson. on YouTube
