= Murder of Lola Daviet =

2022 homicide case in France

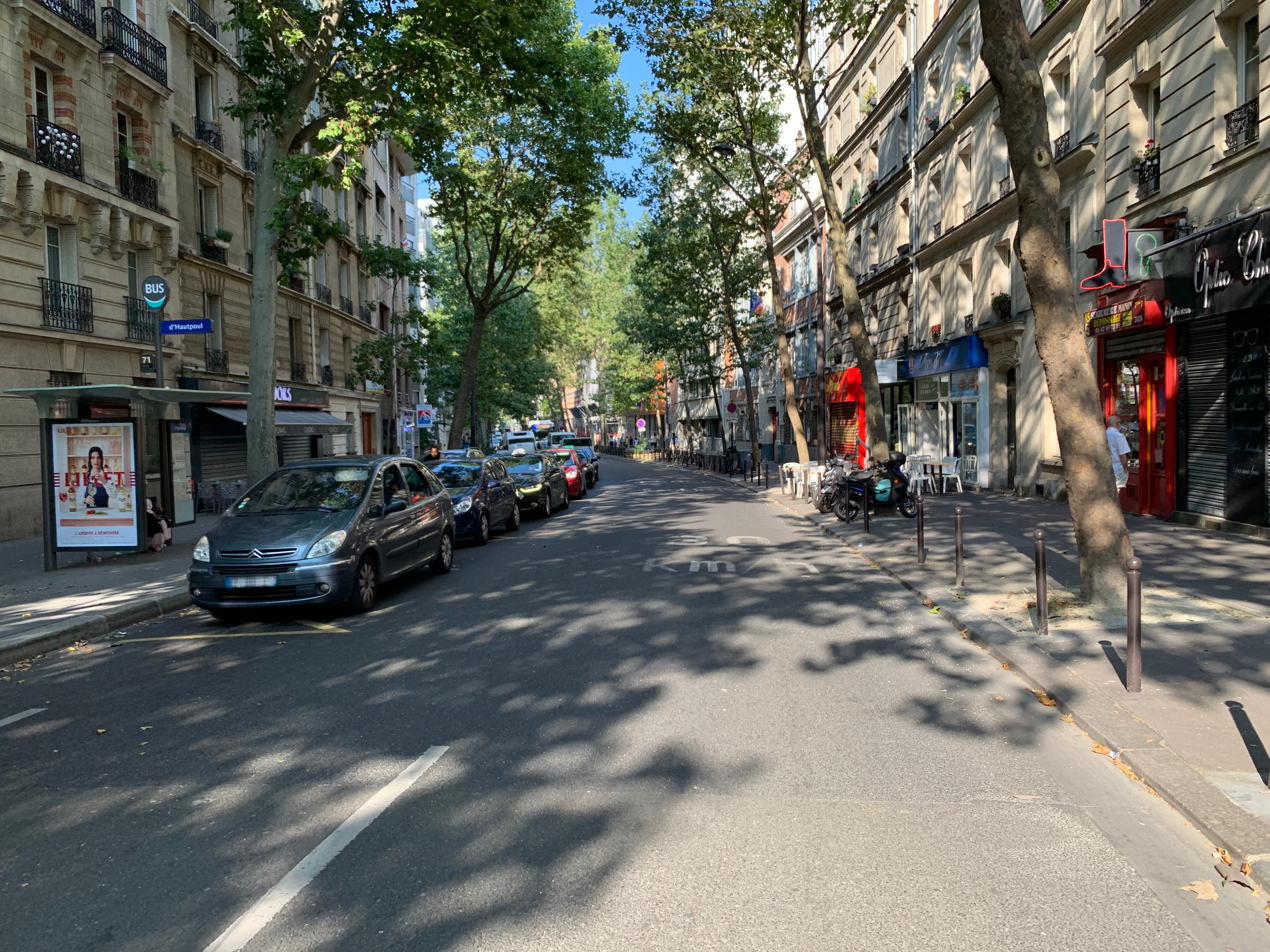
- Rue Manin, the street where the murder occurred, in the 19th arrondissement of Paris
- Location: 48°53′1.91″N 2°23′22.2″E; 19th arrondissement, Paris, France
- Date: 14 October 2022; 4 years ago
- Attack type: Rape; asphyxiation; stabbing
- Weapons: Knife; duct tape
- Victim: Lola Daviet
- Perpetrator: Dahbia Benkired
- Convictions: Murder of a minor under 15; rape with torture; acts of barbarism

On 14 October 2022, 12-year-old Lola Daviet was found dead in a travel trunk in the 19th arrondissement of Paris, France. It was subsequently established that she had been abducted, raped, and murdered, her cause of death being asphyxiation. The perpetrator, Dahbia Benkired, was recorded by a CCTV circuit leaving the building in the afternoon carrying heavy luggage, which included the suitcase holding the victim's body. Benkired, an Algerian national who had been in France illegally, was sentenced to life in prison in 2025 by the Paris cour d'assises. Daviet's father fell into alcoholism and died 16 months after his daughter's murder, at age 49.

== Victim ==
Lola Daviet was born on 18 August 2010 in Béthune to Johan Daviet and Delphine Daviet-Ropital. She was a pupil at the Collège Georges Brassens in Paris and was a champion in aerobics.

== Abduction, rape, and murder ==
On 14 October 2022, at about 16:30 (UTC+1), Johan Daviet, after his daughter failed to return home from school, reported to a police station that Lola Daviet was missing. Lola's mother, Delphine, posted the same day at 18:45 a message on Facebook reporting her daughter's disappearance.

Johan, then, who was the caretaker of the building, consulted the CCTV footage, which showed Lola entering the building at 15:20, and then following a woman, suspected to be Dahbia Benkired, into an apartment. According to Benkired's initial confession, she had lured Lola into the apartment of Benkired's sister, who was also residing in the building, and, there, she ordered the girl to shower. Benkired then raped Lola and forced the girl to perform cunnilingus on her, before putting adhesive tape on Lola's face. As was found in the subsequent autopsy, Lola died from asphyxiation. She was also stabbed multiple times in the body and the neck with a knife, an oyster knife, and a pair of scissors. There was also evidence of cervical compression.

Police found duct tape and a box cutter in the apartment building's basement, and started a criminal investigation. At 23:30, a homeless man reported the discovery of a body inside a travel trunk; the body had been mutilated and tied up.

== Perpetrator ==
On 17 October 2022, 24-year-old Dahbia Benkired (Arabic: ذهبية بن كريد) was indicted on charges of "murder of a minor under 15", "rape with torture," and "acts of barbarism". Born in Algiers, Algeria, Benkired had come to France legally, in May 2016, on a student visa, which she then overstayed. She had no prior criminal record and was known to the police as a victim of domestic violence, committed in 2018. After her indictment, she was held in isolation at Fresnes Prison.

Benkired was unemployed and lived with an acquaintance in Val-de-Marne or with her 26-year-old sister in the same apartment building in Paris as the Daviet family. Her sister testified to the investigators that Benkired had been making incoherent statements at night. Lola's mother, caretaker of the apartment where Benkired's sister lived, had rejected Benkired's request for a pass that would enable her to enter the apartment on her own.

Benkired, who was not known to psychiatric services, was declared mentally fit to be interviewed by the police. Benkired's lawyer, Alexandre Silva, denied that the murder was racially motivated.

On 21 August 2022, Benkired had been detained at Orly Airport for having neither a plane ticket nor valid identity papers, and was issued an obligation to leave French territory (French: Obligation de quitter le territoire français; OQTF) the same day. As she had no criminal record, she was not sent to a detention centre, but given 30 days to return to Algeria.

== Investigation ==
During her interrogation, Benkired fluctuated between accepting and denying responsibility, and claimed that her initial account of committing the crime was actually a recall of a dream. At one point, she blamed the crime on an armed stranger, then on a ghost. When shown pictures of Lola's body, Benkired responded, "This leaves me indifferent. I was raped too and I saw my parents die in front of me". Benkired said that her motive was the dispute with Lola's mother.

== Trial and sentence ==
Psychiatric evidence introduced at Benkired's trial stated that she was of normal intelligence and was not suffering from any psychological trouble, displaying no psychiatric pathology. When handing down the sentence, the chief judge (président de la cour) stressed "the extreme cruelty of the criminal deeds" and the aspect of "real torture", further saying that the court had taken into account the "indescribable" psychological harm done to both the victim and her family (which included her father's death two years after her murder).

At the conclusion of the week-long trial, Dahbia Benkired, before the court began its deliberations, stated: "I ask for forgiveness. What I did is horrible. That's all I have to say." The court, on 24 October 2025, sentenced her to life in prison without parole for raping and murdering Lola Daviet. This sentence is known in France as réclusion criminelle à perpétuité incompressible ("irreducible indefinite criminal imprisonment") or perpétuité réelle ("real perpetuity"). Benkired is the first woman in France to receive this sentence since it was introduced into French law in 1994, to which only four other criminals have been sentenced (Pierre Bodein, Michel Fourniret, Nicolas Blondiau, and Yannick Luende Bothelo), all of them men.

== Reactions ==
After it was revealed that the suspect had ignored, without repercussions, the order to leave French territory, political figures of the right criticized the government of President Emmanuel Macron for the crime. In the National Assembly, Marine Le Pen of the National Rally (RN) criticized Prime Minister Élisabeth Borne, who responded arguing that the criminal process should be left to the police and judiciary. Éric Zemmour of Reconquête coined the term "Francocide" to denote the murder of a French person, for which he was criticised by Gérald Darmanin, the Minister of the Interior. Éric Pauget of The Republicans told the Ministry of Justice Éric Dupond-Moretti that "Lola lost her life because you didn't expel this national".

Macron met Lola's parents on 19 October 2022. He characterized the murder as an act of "extreme evil" while the Minister of the Interior represented the government at the victim's funeral. The family's attorney said the parents have called on politicians to not exploit their daughter's predicament and photographs for political ends, after right-wing activists called for a return of the death penalty at a protest while using the Apartheid-era flag of South Africa.

Devastated by his daughter's fate, Lola's father fell into alcoholism, separated from his wife, lost his job, and died of health complications less than two years before the trial, on 23 February 2024, in Fouquereuil, at the age of 49.

== See also ==
- Murder of Sandra Cantu – Murder of young American girl
