= Killing of Louis Hervé =

2026 fatal beating of a teenager in Narbonne, France

- Location: Narbonne, Aude, France
- Date: 19 June 2026
- Target: Louis Hervé
- Attack type: Group assault, beating
- Deaths: 1 (Louis Hervé, died 23 June 2026)
- Accused: Five suspects (three minors, two aged 18 and 19)
- Charges: Murder

The killing of Louis Hervé was the killing of 17-year-old Louis Hervé on the night of 19 June 2026 in Narbonne, Aude, France. According to the investigators, he was lured to a construction site and assaulted by a group of five young men. He was discovered unconscious the following morning and died from his injuries on 23 June at a hospital in Perpignan.

== Background ==
Louis had been diagnosed in childhood with attention deficit hyperactivity disorder (ADHD). Therefore, he attended a therapeutic, educational and pedagogical institute (ITEP) in the Aude department until the age of 16. Since May, 2026 he had been living in a child welfare facility operated by the Child Welfare Services (ASE).

According to the Narbonne Prosecutor, in the weeks before his death, Louis reported multiple assaults. He filed a police complaint on 11 May 2026 over an unrelated incident and later reported another assault to the gendarmerie on 12 June, although he did not submit a formal complaint.

== Attack ==
On the evening of 19 June 2026, a group of young men arranged to meet Louis in central Narbonne before walking with him to a construction site on the banks of the Canal de la Robine, near the town's railway station. There he was ambushed, beaten repeatedly and sustained severe facial injuries with bleeding from the nose and mouth. A portion of the assault was recorded by one of the youths present. The video was later shared on social media and showed four teenagers punching and kicking the victim as he lay motionless on the ground.

Louis was found unconscious at the site by a construction worker on the morning of 20 June. He was taken first to a hospital in Narbonne and then transferred to a hospital in Perpignan where he underwent surgery for cerebral edema but remained in a coma with severe brain injuries. Three days after the incident, he died of his injuries on 23 June 2026.

== Investigation and suspects ==
Police used footage circulating on social media along with phone records to identify those involved in the attack. Five suspects were charged and placed in pre-trial detention. Prosecutors stated that none had prior criminal records and that the motive remained unknown.

== Reactions ==
Following Louis Hervé's death, vigils and demonstrations were held in Narbonne, Carcassonne, and Paris. Organizers and participants called for stricter penalties for minors convicted of violent offences. Thousands of people attended a "white march" and a separate rally in Narbonne held under the slogan "Justice for Louis". Louis's family said they would not participate because they did not want his death to be linked to political causes.

== See also ==
- Crime in France
- List of major crimes in France (2000–present)
