= Murders of Christelle and Lucas Leroy =

2005 criminal case in France

- Location: Paris, France
- Date: 20 February 2005; 8:45 a.m. – 9:15 a.m.
- Target: Christelle Leroy; Lucas Leroy
- Attack type: Double murder
- Deaths: 2
- Perpetrator: Bérenger Brouns
- Motive: Anger
- Verdict: Guilty
- Convictions: 2007

On 20 February 2005, a 26-year-old woman, Christelle Leroy, and her 4-year-old son Lucas were murdered in Paris by Bérenger Brouns, the woman's employer and lover.

== Biographies ==
=== Bérenger Brouns ===
In 2005, Bérenger Brouns was a 43-year-old man, rather tall, married for 20 years at the time of the events. He had two children and a lifestyle based on his work and family. He could be described as "an average guy".

A hardworking businessman, he owns several shops in Paris. He notably managed the Italian delicatessen in the Saint-Martin Market where Christelle Leroy, one of the victims, worked. He was considered a friendly and approachable man, and his customers generally liked him.

His childhood was marked by his parents' separation. He sometimes appeared quick-tempered to his family and colleagues, even though he had never had any problems and had a clean criminal record. However, he sometimes struggled to control himself at work when something annoyed him.

His life took a dramatic turn when he met his employee Christelle Leroy, with whom he fell madly in love. Their relationship however was fraught; as he did not want a divorce from his wife, and the affair continued amid difficulty. His wife was aware of this extramarital affair with the much younger woman, which she accepted on the condition that her husband stayed with her and their two children.

=== Christelle Leroy ===
At the time of the events, Christelle Leroy was a 26-year-old woman. She had a four-year-old son named Lucas from a previous relationship. She lived in an apartment in the 10th arrondissement of Paris, which her boss and lover had found for her near the market where they worked. She was known as a rebellious and unstable woman not particularly interested in her studies, but she obtained a vocational certificate in butchery and delicatessen sales and immediately began working. After several jobs, she was hired by Bérenger Brouns at his shop in the Saint-Martin market.

Their relationship has been tumultuous, but according to several witnesses, Bérenger Brouns seemed to have "a deep connection" with her. In 2004, Christelle became pregnant by her lover Bérenger, but instead chose to separate and have an abortion. The same year, she became pregnant again by him but had already made an appointment with her gynecologist to have another abortion.

== Murders ==
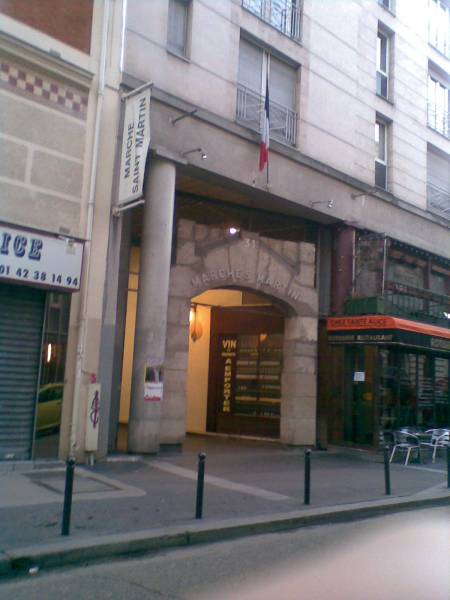
Saint-Martin Market, where the bodies of Christelle and Lucas Leroy were dismembered in February 2005

On Sunday, 20 February 2005, in the early afternoon, a violent argument broke out between Bérenger Brouns and Christelle Leroy. She had already had an abortion and reportedly wanted to leave him for good. They grappled, she slapped him, and Bérenger then strangled his mistress, followed by her four-year-old son, Lucas. He then suffocated their pet dog, Mabelle. Bérenger left to meet his wife around 4:00 p.m., as if nothing had happened. He suggested they go shopping in the Bercy district, but later admitted that he was in a daze and unable to recall what he had seen at the time.

The night after the murders, Bérenger Brouns placed the bodies of the woman and child in large travel bags, loaded them into his vehicle, and drove them to his back room in the Saint-Martin market. Coldly, he donned a plastic apron, grabbed his butcher's tools, and began dismembering the two bodies. Over the next four days, he disposed of them, piece by piece, in various garbage cans. Their two heads ended up in two buckets, into which Bérenger Brouns poured cement before dumping them in the Saint-Martin market's dumpsters. Nobody ever heard from Christelle, Lucas, or Mabelle, their cocker spaniel, again.

Bérenger Brouns was taken into custody after four months of lies, and confessed shortly afterwards.

== Investigation and proceedings ==
=== Investigation ===
Christelle Leroy and her son Lucas' family heard had no news of them. Days went by, and Christelle did not answer her phone which worried her family and caused them to alert the police and filing a missing person report. The police, who believed that Christelle and Lucas had left for the February school holidays, did not take the family's statements seriously. Desperate, Christelle's mother decided to contact several media outlets to help find them. But since Christelle Leroy was an adult, they couldn't do much. In the end, only the magazine Le Nouveau Détective responded to her requests.

On 24 February 2005, journalist Nicolas Deliez arrived at the scene. He informed the police of his findings (old traces of blood on the front door). The missing persons unit was then contacted because, as Christelle was an adult and the evidence was so inconclusive without a body, the criminal investigation unit could not be called in. Forensic experts also examined Christelle's apartment. But for the time being, nothing truly tangible had been discovered.

On 25 February 2005, Christelle and her son had been missing for almost a week. Police finally questioned Bérenger Brouns at his workplace. Although some details remained odd (he had two scars around his nose). Nothing immediately suggested foul play, and he seemed genuinely worried about the disappearance of his mistress and employee.

A new statement threw everything into disarray: Christelle's next-door neighbour and landlady, Irène Lerman, claimed to have seen her on Monday, meaning that Bérenger Bourns may not had been the last person to have seen Christelle alive.

Bérenger's grief began to convince those around him of his innocence, particularly the young woman's family, who also started to doubt his guilt. A week later, the school term resumed, and neither Christelle nor her son had reappeared. Lucas hadn't returned to school, and Christelle's bank accounts hadn't seen activity since her disappearance. The police interrogated Bérenger Brouns one last time, hoping to obtain some information. They found him to be calm, even-tempered, and very cooperative. He expressed his suspicions that Christelle had left him impulsively, as was her habit. He also added that he loved her and was waiting for her return. When a police officer asked him if he had killed her, Bérenger replied, "No, of course not!".

After a month, the brigade closed the case and transferred it to the Public Prosecutor. There was no trace of life or body to be found. The prosecutor then opened a formal investigation and assigned the Criminal Investigation Unit to the case.

On 4 April 2005, the police discovered an important piece of evidence in Christelle's phone records: on the day of her disappearance, at 10:16 p.m., she received a call located near Bérenger Brouns's home. However, he claimed not to have heard from her since 2:00 p.m.

On 14 April 2005, the criminal investigation unit discovered that all of Christelle's belongings were missing from her apartment. Bérenger Brouns had taken them, claiming that the landlord wanted to re-let the apartment. This peculiar behaviour alerted the police, who went to the Saint-Martin Market. There, they found Christelle's belongings in the market's warehouse, along with a note revealing a gynecological appointment scheduled for February 2005. The missing woman was likely pregnant and had evidently missed the appointment.

The police then became convinced that Brouns had been involved in the disappearances from the start, but no evidence could confirm their suspicions. On 8 June 2005, three months after the disappearance, Bérenger Brouns and his wife were arrested and taken into custody for complicity. After an interrogation in which they were asked to explain themselves separately, Brouns describes his whereabouts on the day of Christelle's death. The police played along to gain his trust and then took him to a cell while his wife was released.

After this, the investigating officers demanded the truth from him. He was trapped by them regarding the phone records, and he ended up confessing the whole story: he had killed Christelle and Lucas Leroy by strangling them. The murders took place on 20 February 2005 (so the neighbour was apparently mistaken). Exhausted by their destructive affair, Brouns flew into a rage during yet another argument with Christelle Leroy, who had just slapped him, and strangled her in a fit of anger. Believing he had already gone too far, he also strangled her young son Lucas to eliminate a witness before suffocating the family dog. He then returned to his wife and claimed to have no recollection of what had happened.

When his wife left for her night shift, he took the opportunity to return to Christelle's house and place the bodies into garbage bags, which he then slipped into two large travel bags to transport in the trunk of his car to the market where he placed the two bodies his back room at the butchers. There, he meticulously dismembered them and coldly threw the various pieces into garbage cans at random along his route home. To dispose of the two dismembered heads, he encased them in quick-setting cement and threw them in the market's trash. He carefully cleaned the equipment thoroughly with a very powerful professional detergent and bleached the drains. As a result, investigators found no trace of blood removed with the Bluestar product. He also disposed of the knives he had used and his victim's cell phone.

Shortly afterward, police found receipts for cleaning supplies, cement, and new knives, confirming Brouns' confession. Four months after the murders, the search for the body parts yielded nothing, and they were never found. The detectives from the criminal investigation unit summoned Christelle's mother and Lucas's father to inform them that they were both deceased, without providing any further details. They only learned of the murderer's full account the following day, through the media.

== Trial and conviction ==
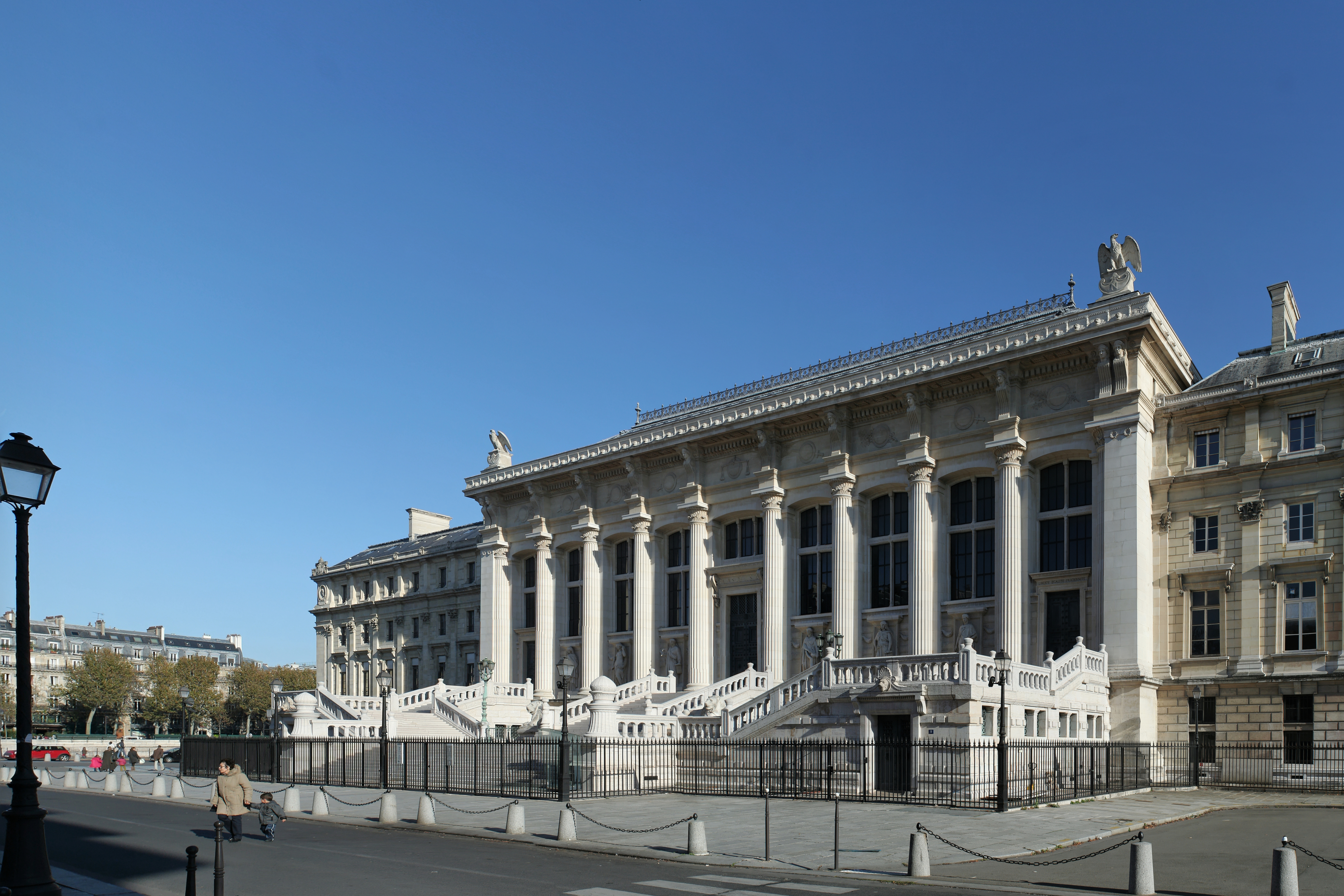
Paris cour d'assises where Béranger Brouns was sentenced for the double murder

When questioned by the Court about the defendant's personality, the psychiatric and psychological experts described him as a perfectly normal and ordinary man, but with a hot temper and quick to anger, therefore capable of flying into a violent rage over nothing.

The relatives of the two victims were surprised and horrified when the accused described in the most sordid detail during the proceedings the meticulous and almost professional way in which he dismembered the bodies.

On Tuesday, 27 February 2007, the Paris Cour d'assises sentenced Béranger Brouns to 30 years' imprisonment, without parole. He was not found guilty of a crime of passion. He did not appeal the decision. Christelle's mother regretted that no minimum term of imprisonment had been imposed on him.

In prison, Béranger Brouns regularly receives visits from his wife, who remains "the rock he can always cling to..."

== See also ==
- List of major crimes in France (1900–present)
- List of murder convictions without a body
- List of solved missing person cases (2000s)

== Television documentaries ==
- “Bérenger Brouns, The butcher of the St. Martin market” - 28 March 2010 in Faites entrer l'accusé presented by Christophe Hondelatte on France 2.
- “The butcher of Saint-Martin” on 5 April 2013 in Suspect no 1 on TMC.
- “The Butcher of Saint-Martin” (second report) on May 10, 2014, in Chroniques criminelles on NT1.
- "The Saint Martin Market Dissector" (second report) in "...in Greater Paris" on 26 February 2018 in Crimes on NRJ 12.
- “Mysterious disappearances in Paris” on 6 December 2018 in Indices on RMC Story.

== Radio broadcast ==
- “Bérenger Brouns, the butcher from the St. Martin market” 10 October 2016 in Hondelatte raconte by Christophe Hondelatte on Europe 1.
