= Murder of Alexandre Junca =

2011 murder in Pau, France

Alexandre Junca
- Born: Alexandre Junca; 1998
- Disappeared: 4 June 2011 (aged 13); Pau, Pyrénées-Atlantiques
- Died: 4 June 2011 (aged 12–13)
- Body discovered: June - October 2011

On 4 June 2011, Alexandre Junca a 13-year-old boy disappeared in Pau, France after returning alone from a party with friends. That evening he was killed with a hammer, robbed of his mobile phone and then dismembered. His murderer, Mickaël Baehrel, was sentenced to life imprisonment in June 2016.

== Events ==
At the time of his disappearance Alexandre Junca was a student at the Clermont middle school in Pau. On Saturday night of 4 June 2011 at around 10:50 p.m., Alexandre disappeared in Pau while returning to his father's house on his bicycle at high speed after a party with his school friends. He appeared on a video surveillance camera just 200 m (660 ft) from his home before disappearing. His bicycle was found the next day tied to a post not far from his father's home.

While walking near the market hall, a few metres from his father's home, Junca was accosted by Christophe Camy and had his mobile phone stolen. Camy, who was suffering from psychiatric disorders, was on leave that evening to celebrate his 23rd birthday. After he had been robbed of his phone which was only worth 9 euros, a verbal altercation ensued between Alexandre Junca and Camy, attracting the attention of Mickaël Baerhel, a man known to the courts for his acts of violence and drunkenness. Baerhel intervened in the altercation to defend the young boy, who had gone to tie his bike to a post, before taking possession of the mobile phone held by Camy.

Without warning, Baerhel then took out a hammer and struck the young boy violently, which rendered him unconscious. This was continued with further physical violence which ended with killing him in the street. After witnessing the attack Camy fled the scene. With the help of one of his friends, Christian Pierre who also witnessed the attack, Baehrel took the teenager's body to the home of his partner, Fatima Ennajah. It was dismembered the next day by Mickaël Baehrel's 73-year-old associate, Claude Ducos. His dismembered body was subsequently thrown into the Gave de Pau.

The search for the boy included twenty police officers from the Pau and Bayonne branches of the police judiciaire. The police initially thought it was a case of a runaway. Missing posters appeared around town on buses and in shops and public buildings. His school commemorated the student. One false sighting was a motorist who claimed to see him hitchhiking at the entrance to the A64 motorway towards the Basque coast.

The bones of Alexandre Junca were discovered gradually. His femur was found in the river three weeks later on 26 June 2011. A homeless man found the bone on the river bank and it was forensically matched to the missing person report. In October 2011 more body parts were found under a river dike.

== People involved in the case ==
Five people were involved in the case and each appeared before the Pyrénées-Atlantiques Cour d'assises. The two main suspects were Mickaël Baerhel, who was known to be violent and alcoholic, and Christophe Camy, who suffered from psychiatric disorders. Both were tried for "robbery with violence resulting in death".

Alongside these two suspects, Claude Ducos, a 73-year-old pensioner at the time of the crime, also appeared at court, suspected of having helped dispose of the body. He was tried for "concealment of a corpse", "attack on the integrity of a corpse", "destruction of evidence" and "failure to report a crime" and faced three years in prison. Fatima Ennajah, Baerhel's partner, was charged with "concealment of a corpse" and "failure to report a crime". Christian Pierre, Baerhel's friend, who had witnessed the crime, had died in 2012.

== Trials and convictions ==
On 6 June 2014, three years after the murder, Christophe Camy was arrested. The trial which took place in June 2016, was attended by the victim's parents Valérie Lance and Philippe Junca. On 7 June 2016, the accused suspects regularly changed their versions during the legal proceedings. During the trial, Ducos categorically denied his involvement in the events. Ennajah, who also suffered from psychiatric disorders, gave incoherent statements. Baehrel revealed that Alexander Junca did not die at the first blow of the hammer and that his tears caused his unleashing of violence.

On 16 June 2016, the Pau Assize Court delivered its verdict. Mickaël Baehrel was sentenced to life imprisonment for "robbery resulting in death". Christophe Camy was sentenced to fifteen years in prison for "robbery resulting in death". Fatima Ennajah was sentenced to three years in prison for "failure to report a crime". Claude Ducos was sentenced to three years in prison for "concealment of a corpse", "harm to the integrity of a corpse", "destruction of evidence", and "failure to report a crime". Ducos was released from prison in July 2017 (taking into account pretrial detention), and Fatima Ennajah was also released.

== Television documentaries ==
- "Alexander's ordeal" (first report) in "... in Béarn" on 24 November 2014 in Crimes on NRJ 12.
- "The Alexandre Junca affair: a barbaric crime over a telephone" (first report) 21 January 2017 in Chroniques criminelles on NT1.
- "The Alexandre Junca affair, the adolescent martyr" on 20 January 2024 in Au bout de l'enquête, la fin du crime parfait ? on France 2.
- "Alexandre,14 ans, mort pour rien" in the podcast "Hondelatte raconte" presented by Christophe Hondelatte on Europe 1, 22 July 2024.

== See also ==
- List of major crimes in France (1900–present)
- List of solved missing person cases (2010s)
