= Murder of Agnès Lassalle =

2023 murder case in France

- Location: Saint-Jean-de-Luz, France
- Date: 22 February 2023
- Weapon: Knife
- Deaths: 1 (Agnès Lassalle)
- Accused: 1 minor

On 22 February 2023, schoolteacher Agnès Lassalle was stabbed to death by a 16-year-old student while teaching a Spanish lesson at Saint-Thomas-d'Aquin high school in Saint-Jean-de-Luz, France.

== Background ==
Agnès Lassalle had worked at the private Catholic school since 1997.

== Crime ==
Around 10 a.m. at Saint-Thomas-d'Aquin high school during Spanish class, the murderer suddenly stood up, blocked the classroom door, and stabbed his teacher. Emergency services arrived but the victim died at the scene. "He was very calm", confided one of the teenage girls present in the room. The students fled the classroom. The suspected perpetrator went to an adjoining room where he was detained by teachers before being apprehended by the police. He was not known to the police.

== Consequences ==
The following day, a minute of silence in tribute to Agnès Lasalle was observed in all French schools. During Agnès Lasalle's funeral, her husband, Stéphane Voirin, danced in her honor in front of her coffin. He has campaigned against violence in schools. In February 2025, the court decided that the murderer would be tried before a cour d'assises. In June 2025, the court refused a new psychiatric evaluation of the teenager.

== Tributes ==
A year after the murder, a commemorative plaque was placed in the garden of the Peyuco-Duhart cultural center in Saint-Jean-de-Luz. In 2024, Eddy de Pretto wrote a tribute song, Urgence 911, which was inspired by the dance of Agnès Lassalle's husband. In 2025, Julien Clerc sang the song Les Parvis, inspired by the same event.

== See also ==
- List of major crimes in France (2000–present)
- Murder of Ann Maguire, murder of a schoolteacher in England
