= Jacques Plumain =

Suspected French serial killer

- Born: 14 August 1973 (age 53); Guadeloupe
- Other names: "The Ghost of Kehl" "The Border Killer" "The Kehl Killer"
- Convictions: Murder (x2); Attempted murder Assault
- Penalty: Life imprisonment with 30-year security period

Details
- Victims: 2–5
- Span of crimes: 1999–2000
- Country: Germany, France
- States: Baden-Württemberg, Bas-Rhin
- Date apprehended: 19 January 2001

Jacques Plumain (born 14 August 1973), known as The Ghost of Kehl (French: Fantôme de Kehl), is a French suspected serial killer who was convicted of killing two women in Germany and France from 1999 to 2001, but is considered a suspect in three others, being acquitted for one and never brought to trial for the other two.

In 2005, he was sentenced to life imprisonment with a 30-year security period, which was later reduced to 20 years on appeal. He has been eligible for parole since January 2021.

== Early life ==
Jacques Plumain was born on 14 August 1973, in Guadeloupe, an overseas department administered by France. The fourth of six children, all half-siblings fathered by different men, with Plumain's own father, a Jehovah's Witness, refusing to take part in raising him. A mediocre student during his youth, he was physically abused on a regular basis by his overbearing mother, whom he claimed beat him with a variety of appliances such as her belt, telephone cord, an electric cable or a broomstick. Later on, Plumain would also claim that he was sexually assaulted by a cousin at age 13.

In 1989, the 16-year-old left Guadeloupe and moved to the French mainland, where he settled in Strasbourg in early 1990 and finished an apprenticeship as a cook. During that year, he started frequenting various nightclubs, where had numerous sexual liaisons with various women. In 1994, Plumain, a master corporal serving in the 1st Engineering Regiment of Illkirch, was stationed in Sarajevo and later Kosovo, where he disabled landmines. He was awarded a medal for his actions but later quit to become a security guard. Plumain later claimed that he had seen a friend of his get shot through the eyes by an enemy sniper, but this story has not been substantiated. During his time working as a security guard, Plumain complained that he was mistreated due to his skin colour, and the only time he truly felt at peace was when he was playing sports. By the end of the 1990s, however, he gave up on sports and rejoined the army but was later dishonourably discharged for stealing a credit card.

== Murders ==
=== First suspected murders ===
In May 1999, the police in Plobsheim were notified of the murder of a 23-year-old prostitute, whose body was found in a garage. As he was a soldier stationed near the area at the time, Plumain was proposed as a suspect, but was not arrested due to a lack of evidence against him. Later that month, he completed his service and returned to Strasbourg, where he worked as a sprinter at the FC Sochaux-Montbéliard and later as a security guard.

On 25 July, the body of 30-year-old Sylvia Hironimous was discovered in the backyard of a building in Strasbourg. At the time, nothing connected this murder to Plumain, who up until then had no criminal record and no concrete evidence indicated he was a viable suspect. However, three days later, he stabbed and seriously injured another young woman at the exit of a nightclub, for which he would be arrested. While he categorically denied responsibility, Plumain was nonetheless convicted and sentenced to a year in prison but appealed the decision to the criminal court. He succeeded in obtaining it due to lack of evidence connecting him to the crime, and he was released on 7 October of that year.

=== "Ghost of Kehl" murders ===
On 11 October 1999, at 4:00 AM, 22-year-old Turkish nurse Hatice Celik was attacked in the courtyard of a retirement home in Kehl, Germany, with her assailant knocking her down and dragging her away from prying eyes. Then, Celik was stabbed and had her throat cut, before the killer lowered her panties, without sexually assaulting her. While Plumain is considered the prime suspect in this case, he never admitted guilt to Celik's murder and was never convicted in his following trials.

On 23 November, at 4:00 AM, 38-year-old Barbel Zobel was attacked by Plumain just as she was leaving her house to go to work. He hit her from behind, but Zobel managed to call for help, at which point her husband intervened and caused the assailant to flee. As a result of these two recent cases, the Kehl police decided to conduct patrols to prevent further incidents.

On 4 December, around 3:00 AM, Plumain was looking for a nightclub in Kehl, but got lost in the back roads. While wandering around, he stumbled upon 66-year-old Gisela Dallmann, a retiree who was distributing newspapers. He approached her from behind, but Dallmann was alerted to his presence, forcing him to press his hand against her mouth. After the woman bit him, the enraged Plumain hit her and dragged her off to an isolated corner, where he severed her carotid artery and pulled down her panties. He also inserted his finger into her vagina, in order to simulate a rape. Dallmann's body was found in the early morning in the backyard of a building. Following this third case, the Kehl police decided to monitor the city from top to bottom in order to catch the killer, who was given the nickname "The Ghost of Kehl". The investigation was unsuccessful, however, and Plumain soon returned to Strasbourg.

On 15 May 2000, around 9:00 PM, Plumain crossed paths with 44-year-old Ursula Brelowski, a German professor at the Robert Schuman University, in the La Wantzenau forest near Strasbourg, while she was riding a bicycle. Frustrated at the unavailability of any women to date, he punched her in the throat and dragged her off into the forest, where he stabbed Brelowski a dozen times in the torso, arms and legs before finally slitting her throat. The victim's body was found twenty hours later. At this stage of the investigation, the French police were contacted by the Kehl police several times without success, before they could make a connection between the cases in Germany.

== Arrest ==
On 19 January 2001, Plumain was arrested for assaulting a motorist with a katana. He claimed that he had a "score to settle" with the driver, with whom he had had a violent argument a few months earlier. As a result, he was imprisoned for attempted murder, and by this time, he came under suspicion by investigators working on the "Ghost of Kehl" case.

On 19 June, Plumain was interrogated about the crimes, and much to the investigators' surprise, he readily confessed to the crimes. Regarding the Brelowski murder, he said that he thought she was an acquaintance of his, but upon talking to her, Brelowski said that he was mistaken, with Plumain additionally claiming that she "didn't have negroes in her relationships." Upon hearing this, Plumain said he "saw red" and beat her into unconsciousness, before dragging her off into the woods and killing her there. As with previous victims, he lowered her panties to make it appear as if she had been raped. At the insistence of Brelowski's family, who were anxious to clear her daughter's name, Plumain later admitted that the victim never made any racist remarks, which he had fabricated. He additionally claimed that he never intended to kill Zobel, but he instinctively attacked her because she caught him stealing bicycle tyres. On the other hand, he denied involvement in the murder of Hatice Celik. Soon after his confessions, he was indicted for the three murders and the attempted murder of Zobel. In June 2002, seventeen months after Plumain's initial internment, he was indicted for the murder of Sylvia Hironimus, which he also denied.

== Trials and convictions ==
On 24 September 2003, Plumain's trial for the attempted murder of the motorist began in the cour d'assises of Strasbourg. He was found guilty and sentenced to 12 years' imprisonment. On 18 May 2005, his murder trial began at the same court, with Emmanuel Karm and Jean Guibert serving as his attorneys. On the prosecuting side, Gioia Zirone acted as Zobel's lawyer while Thomas Mutter was the lawyer for Marc Fisher, Ursula Brelowski's ex-partner. Brice Raymondeau-Castanet was the general counsel.

During the proceedings, Plumain appeared cold, detached and rarely spoke. In his statements, he claimed that a person named "Maïve" was the one who had killed all the women and also claimed that a partial reason why he had attacked Zobel was because she resembled his mother. The Brelowski family's lawyers claimed that the victim would have never called him a "nigger", insisting that Plumain had killed Ursula solely out of impulse, not because of her alleged racist remarks. A psychiatric evaluation noted that Plumain was a pathological liar who liked to enjoy the sight of degrading his victims. Near the end of the trial, Plumain, out of apparent remorse, confessed to the attack on Zobel and the murders of Dallmann and Brelowski, claiming that he was "not a victim" and pointing towards the benches where Zobel and Dallmann's son were seated.

On 3 June 2005, Plumain was convicted of two counts of murder and attempted murder, for which he was given a life term with a 30-year security sentence. As he was acquitted of Celik's murder, the prosecution demanded a new trial. On 27 March 2006, the appeal trial began in the cour d'assises in Colmar, where he was again found guilty, but his security sentence was reduced to 20 years. In March 2008, the charges in the Hironimous murder was dismissed due to lack of evidence.

Plumain has been eligible for release ("libérable") since January 2021, which means he could potentially be released if granted parole. At trial proceedings, he claimed that he willingly attended psychiatric examinations in order to better understand why he had committed the murders and that he had embraced Catholicism, claiming that he was a reformed man. His potential release is criticized by his attorney, who stated that his former client could still pose a danger to society.

== TV documentaries ==
- "Jacques Plumain, the Ghost of Kehl" (September 2008; January 2010) on Faites entrer l'accusé, presented by Christophe Hondelatte on France 2.
- "The border killer (first report) ...in Alsace-Lorraine" (21 September, 28 September and 6 October 2015) on Crimes on NRJ 12.
