= Valérie Bacot case =

French legal case

The Valérie Bacot case, also known as the Clayette case, is a French legal case, which follows the 2016 murder of Daniel Polette by his wife Valérie Bacot, after years of abuse and forced prostitution by Polette.

== Shooting ==
On 13 March 2016 Bacot was raped by a client. Bacot killed her husband by shooting him in the back of the head with a pistol he had hidden in his car.

Bacot stated that she was afraid that her 14-year-old daughter would suffer the same fate as she did.

Her two eldest sons, aged 16 and 17, and Lucas Granet, her daughter's boyfriend, aged 16, helped her to bury the body in a wooded area. Valérie Bacot reported the disappearance of her husband to the police. The body was found on 3 October 2017 in La Clayette, in Saône-et-Loire, thanks to information given by Lucas's mother to the police and on the indications of Valérie Bacot.

== Biography of Valérie Bacot ==
Valérie Bacot is from Saône-et-Loire. Her parents separated in 1992. Her mother, Joëlle Aubagne, is described as an alcoholic who was authoritarian and violent. While she was the manager of a business in downtown La Clayette, she entered into a relationship with Daniel Polette. He moved in with them in December 1992 and began to rape Valérie when she was 12 years old. He was sentenced in April 1996 to four years in prison for sexual assault on a minor under the age of 15, he was released from prison after two and a half years and returned to the family home, where the rapes resumed. At the age of 17, Valérie Bacot fell pregnant by one of the rapes and her mother threw her out of the house.

However, at this time, her mother denies any form of rape and describes the relationship between Valérie Bacot and Daniel Polette as being love. This one demanding the return of her man and writing in a letter addressed to her mother "I want to live MY LIFE, that does not concern you." (...) "I want to stay with my man." Valérie Bacot then barely of age left the family home, her mother assuring that she had never chased her away.

She then moved with Daniel Polette, her step father, to the neighboring town of Baudemont and married him: they remained married for eighteen years and had four children. According to Valérie Bacot's support committee and her statements, her husband then forced her to prostitute herself in a converted minivan Valérie Bacot affirms that Daniel Polette aimed at her several times with an unloaded weapon and that he pulled the trigger, brandishing the threat to load the weapon the next time.

The couple's children claimed to have tried twice to alert the gendarmerie to the family situation, which the gendarmes denied during the trial.

Valérie Bacot recounted her ordeal in a book entitled Tout le monde savait (Everyone Knew), which was published in 2021 by Fayard.

== Trial ==
Valérie Bacot and her children were arrested in October 2017 and she was placed in police custody and then indicted for murder while her two children were indicted for concealment of a corpse and not reporting a crime. After one year in pre-trial detention, she was released under judicial supervision.

On 21 November 2019 the trial of the three children who helped hide the body of their father and stepfather took place in Mâcon. On 19 December the juvenile court followed the recommendations of the prosecution and sentenced them to six months suspended prison sentence for concealing a corpse.

The trial of Valérie Bacot began on 21 June 2021 before the Assize Court of Chalon-sur-Saône. She faced life imprisonment. Before the trial she declared she was "deserving of a sentence".

Bacot was sentenced on 25 June 2021 to four years in prison, with three years suspended. Since she spent one year in pre-trial detention, she was free to return home.
