= Serial murders in Essonne =

Series of murders

The serial murders in Essonne were a series of four murders that occurred from November 2011 to April 2012 in an area of ten square kilometers in the north-east of the department of Essonne, France. The main suspect, Yoni Palmier, was charged on April 16, 2012.

== Features ==
All four victims were shot with the same weapon, a 7.65 mm semi-automatic gun, suggesting to the authorities a lone serial killer.

== The murders ==
On November 27, 2011, in Juvisy-sur-Orge, Nathalie Davids, an employee of the laboratory of thirty-five years, was in the parking of her residence, located at 4 rue Pasteur. Her neighbor found her body and alerted emergency services. She died a few hours later in hospital. Nathalie Davids received seven bullets in her body, including one in the head. A week later, her last partner, Michel Courtois, was arrested. He recognized the facts before retracting. He was charged and remanded in custody in the prison of Fleury-Merogis.

On February 22, 2012, Jean-Yves Bonnerue, a fifty-two-year-old technical framework was shot in the same parking lot. He was shot in the head from behind when he was trying to rid of the boot of his car. Moreover, the victim was the person who discovered the body of Davids. Both victims were neighbors and belonged to the same union council of condominium. They knew each other. It was he who would have provided guidance for the police to find the trace of the last partner of Davids.

On March 17, 2012, in Ris-orangis, Marcel Brunetto, a retired eighty-one years old banker, was killed by a bullet in the neck in the hall of his building at 48 rue Pierre-Brossolette.

On April 5, 2012, in Grigny, Nadjia Lahsene, forty-eight, was killed when she was entering the hall of her building at 1 rue Ravin. The killer shot her three times in the head. This woman of Algerian origin lived alone with her eighteen-year-old son since the death of her companion. She worked at the Paris-Orly airport.

== The investigation ==
The weapon used to kill Lahsene was the same that killed three other people in the same region of Essonne in November, February and March, which supported the police's theory of a single suspect. One hundred investigators mobilized to try to unravel the mystery of a series of four crimes in less than five months in the department. The police launched, Friday, April 6, 2012, in the evening, a call to witness. She wanted to trace in "the west of Paris", a blue and white Suzuki motorcycle type GSX- R 750, a model year 2001 or 2002. The machine had a white rear wheel well, a back cover and the seat was also covered in white. Two lights were embedded in the wheel arch and the muffler was black. This bike would have served the serial killer to escape. The murders were committed with the same weapon: an automatic pistol of 7.65 mm caliber. On April 16, 2012, Yoni Palmier, born December 24, 1978, in Montmorency, Val-d'Oise was arrested. Indications on the weapon were found in a box in Draveil. On April 27, 2012, Yoni Palmier was indicted for murder for three murders mainly because of the following elements:

- Yoni Palmier's DNA was the only one present on the weapon used.
- Palmier rented a box in the parking lot of the building where Nathalie Davids was killed on the 27th and Jean-Yves Bonnerue on the 22nd in Juvisy-sur-Orge.
- Yoni Palmier lived until 2005 on Pierre-Brossolette Street in Ris-Orangis, close to the scene of the murder of Marcel Brunetto.
- The Grigny building in which Nadjia Lahcène was shot is less than 800 metres from a box rented by Palmier in Viry-Châtillon, where a Suzuki GSX-R motorcycle, a scooter, a helmet and a jacket were found. This two-wheeled and these clothes corresponding to those of the killer of Essonne, according to several witnesses.

Palmier was then indicted for the fourth murder, that of Nathalie Davids. Initially, it was Michel Courtois who had been indicted for the murder of this woman, who was his mistress. The latter has since been cleared.

== Yoni Palmier ==
Yoni Palmier
- Born: December 24, 1978 (age 47); Montmorency, France
- Other name: "The Killer of Essonne"
- Conviction: Murder
- Penalty: Life imprisonment

Details
- Victims: 4
- Span of crimes: 2011–2012
- Country: France
- State: Essonne
- Date apprehended: April 16, 2012

Yoni Palmier (born December 24, 1978, in Montmorency), nicknamed "The Killer of Essonne" is a French serial killer convicted for the serial murders in Essonne.

Until 2005 Yoni Palmier lived with his parents in a seven-storey bar in Ris-Orangis. Before this he had already been sentenced six times, the most serious of which was eight months in prison for aggravated violence against his mother, whom he had stabbed, and for carrying a prohibited weapon.

=== Custody ===
- On January 22, 2013, Palmier was transferred to the Fresnes Prison hospital due to a shoulder problem, where he tried to escape: "The supervisors found in his cell a rope of 3 m, a knife, 125 € cash and a metal hook".
- On June 19, 2014, he was severely beaten by several detainees in the Meaux-Chauconin prison walkway.

=== Trial ===
==== First cour d'assises ====
The trial opened on March 31, 2015. His friends described him as a dark and violent character. His only ex-mistress, Valerie, talked about violent sexual acts that made her bleed. She left him because she suspected he was homosexual. Palmier then went on to have a short homosexual relationship with a neighbor.

During the trial, Palmier expressed himself in a very confused way. He recognized himself as the culprit of the first murder, that of Nathalie Davids. He was sentenced to life imprisonment, with a 22-year lock-in period, the maximum penalty provided by the Penal Code. The court also issued a security detention, a rare provision that came into effect in 2008, allowing the release of a convicted person to be re-evaluated each year after his sentence has been served. It is, in theory, the heaviest sentence to be pronounced under the Penal Code.

==== Court of Appeal ====
The trial on appeal began on March 14, 2017. From the beginning of the trial, when questioned by the president, the accused declared that he had committed the four murders; there was no change in the sentence.

== See also ==
- List of serial killers by country
