= Jacqueline Sauvage case =

French murderer (1947–2020)

Jacqueline Sauvage (27 December 1947 — 23 July 2020) of Montargis, France, killed her husband Norbert Marot by shooting him in the back three times with a hunting rifle on 10 September 2012. This occurred the day after Sauvage's son committed suicide. Sauvage stated that Mr Marot had physically and sexually abused his wife, daughters and possibly his son.

A criminal case was then filed against Mrs. Sauvage, that resulted in her being condemned to ten years in prison by a cour d'assises. She then filed an appeal motion, but the verdict remained unchanged, pronounced on 3 December 2015. On 31 January 2016, the French president François Hollande announced his giving a partial presidential pardon to Mrs Sauvage. This resulted in a reduction of her jail time of two years and nine months. On 28 December 2016, M. Hollande pronounced a full pardon, announced both on his personal Twitter account and by a release made by the Elysée. This decision led to Mrs Sauvage's immediate release from the detention centre of Réau.

== Specifics of the case ==
Jacqueline Sauvage was convicted by two different Cours d'assises, in accordance with the French judicial system. Because of this, only a motion presented to the Court of Cassation was possible. However, this court does not re-examine the facts of the case, it merely examines the application of the law within the context of the case. Therefore, the verdict itself could not be questioned, but the sentence could be altered, with a presidential pardon being the only avenue to a full verdict nullification. A demand for a presidential pardon was then filed by the daughters of Mrs. Sauvage, who publicly expressed their relief at their father's death.

President Hollande was known to be reluctant to use the presidential pardon, and had granted a pardon only once since his election in 2012. Nevertheless, he agreed to a meeting with Mrs Sauvage's daughters and lawyers at the Élysée Palace in January 2016.

== Media coverage, who and when ==
This case was the main topic covered by the French media, essentially after the Sauvage sisters' demand was presented to M. Hollande. The media coverage was as diverse as it was intense. Since the end of 2015, feminist associations’ websites, traditional media and public channels, and French social media coverage was entirely focused on the case. A petition launched on the website Change.org to ask the French president to grant a pardon to Mrs. Sauvage garnered 435,971 signatures. On 26 February 2017, a French TV show named "Sept à Huit" received extremely high ratings with five million viewers, due to a segment profiling Jacqueline Sauvage. In addition, the political establishment took a stand for Mrs. Sauvage to create a support committee, including Anne Hidalgo and Jean-Luc Mélenchon.

After the presidential pardon was pronounced, a major debate was launched by lawyers and specialists of criminal law on whether the State of law had been respected. Their stance was that the media had overruled two successive court decisions by influencing the public, who then pushed for the presidential pardon.

== Controversies ==
=== From the woman, guilty of murder to the wife, victim of abuses ===
After the Cour d'assises of first instance found Jacqueline Sauvage guilty of murder, French feminist associations such as Osez le Féminisme released information on Mrs Sauvage's past. These articles depicted a woman, trapped in an abusive relationship for 47 years, beaten, raped and whose three daughters were also raped. This information was meant to defend the thesis of Mrs Sauvage being a victim of domestic and sexual abuse, who acted to defend herself, instead of a cold-hearted murderer. This group also called for the definition of self-defence to be modified, as to include "female victims of violence".

In addition, other outlets reported failure by authorities to help the Sauvage family. When Jacqueline Sauvage tried to kill herself, the doctor did not ask why. When one of her daughters reported being raped by her father to police, the officer called the alleged perpetrator. It was also noted that an average of 223,000 women a year in France are abused by their husbands, and that 134 (on average) are killed by them.

=== Controversy on the royal power of the pardon ===
Régis de Castelnau, lawyer and author of the blog Vu du Droit (In Terms of Law) mentioned a "cult of the innocent guilty" created by the public opinion through the media, with only partial information given about the case. For him, public opinion was mobilised based on a story radically different from the one constituted by a regular and contradictory procedure. He considered the presidential pardon granted to Mrs Sauvage as an insult made to the independence of the judiciary, to the legal profession and to the Republic. This was backed-up by the lawyer Florence Rault, who denounced the media treatment on this case, first on her blog and later published by the Figarovox, saying there was a will to "promote a victimizing feminism and to affirm the impossibility of the existence of female violence". These opinions were a minority voice and do not incorporate the complexity of the case, as established by the judicial system itself.

In an article published by Le Figaro, the philosopher Robert Redeker also contested the pardon, which he considered to be "an insult to democracy motivated by a victimizing ideology". Another philosopher, Michel Onfray, questioned the relevance of the pardon, undermining multiple court decisions and potentially opening the way to self-defence and personal vendettas.

For Marie-Jane Ody, Secretary General of the Union Syndicale of Magistrates, the whole work done during the trial is being denied by the executive power which rules only according to a support committee. She asked for the removal of the presidential pardon, "survival of the royal power", considered incompatible with democracy and the idea of a fair and independent justice.
