= Pierre Bodein =

French criminal and spree killer

- Born: Pierre Fernand Bodein; December 30, 1947 (age 78); Obernai, France
- Other name: "Pierrot le fou"
- Conviction: Murder
- Penalty: Life imprisonment

Details
- Victims: 3
- Span of crimes: June 18, 2004 – June 25, 2004
- Country: France
- State: Alsace
- Date apprehended: July 14, 2004

Pierre Fernand Bodein (born December 30, 1947, in Obernai) is a French criminal and spree killer who, since 1969, has alternated stays between psychiatric hospitals and prisons. Nicknamed "Pierrot le fou" meaning "Pierre the madman", his criminal record includes seven convictions, three of which are murders, including violent rapes. He is the 11th child of a family of 16 children, descending from a Yenish community.

== Crimes ==
After his first prison term, served in 1969, Bodein, a member of a family of "basket makers" (names for travelers settled in Alsace) would have many other stays in prisons, including for robbery, theft and sexual assault. In 1976, due to his health state he was deemed "incompatible for detention". A psychiatric director at the time, Michel Patris, said this about him: "He was in a vegetative state, frozen, shutting himself in silence." Bodein swallowed his excrements, and was now moved in a wheelchair. Released in 1980, he resumed his robberies. He was re-arrested in 1989, and was again considered mentally ill. According to psychiatrist Henri Brunner, "all psychiatric experts on that date considered Bodein crazy, myself included."

In December 1992, he left his wheelchair to escape through a skylight of the psychiatric hospital in Erstein, which had remained open. In a span of three days, he took two women hostage, before sequestering and raping one of them, robbing a bank and armory afterwards. He also attacked several gendarme checkpoints and shot at two policemen, wounding one of them seriously before being intercepted. This event, widely relayed by the media, earned him the nickname "Pierrot le fou".

He was sentenced in 1994 to 30 years imprisonment for these crimes, but was retried in February 1996 on appeal by the cour d'assises of Bas-Rhin, which re-sentenced him to 28 years imprisonment (it was further reduced to 20 years in cassation) in 1996. Bodein then adopted a new strategy, and was described as a "model inmate". Due to his good behaviour, years of pretrial detention, automatic sentencing and remission, he was released on parole on March 14, 2004, a few months before the end of his sentence. He then began living in a caravan belonging to his brother who was a scrap dealer in Bourgheim.

Four months later, Bodein was charged with the kidnapping, rape and murder of 38-year-old Hedwige Vallée, stabbed to death on June 21; 10-year-old Jeanne-Marie Kegelin, found on June 29 and 14-year-old Julie Scharsch, found on July 3. He was first arrested on June 26 before being released for a lack of evidence, but was rearrested and charged on June 30. Some psychiatrists speculated that these constituted substitutes for his own daughter and one of his fellow prisoners, with whom he had established an "obscene" correspondence. He denied the accusations and defended his innocence, but the DNA evidence proved him guilty.

== List of known victims ==
Murder		Discovery		Identity	Age
Date	Place	Date	Place	Identity	Age
June 18, 2004	Rhinau	June 29, 2004	Valff	Jeanne-Marie Kegelin	10
June 21, 2004	Obernai	June 22, 2004	Hindisheim	Hedwige Vallée	38
June 25, 2004	Schirmeck	July 3, 2004	Nothalten	Julie Scharsch	14

== Trial and sentencing ==
On April 11, 2007, the trial of Bodein began at the cour d'assises in Strasbourg, in an adjoining room of the court specifically arranged for the occasion. The "real" life imprisonment sentence (in France the maximum imprisonment is at most 30 years, but in this it was true life imprisonment) was imposed on him on July 4, 2007. The jurors accepted the General Counsel's decision a week later. He was the first prisoner in France to be sentenced to life imprisonment, followed up a year later by Michel Fourniret in May 2008, then in January 2015 by Nicolas Blondiau. His appeal was rejected by the court of Colmar on October 2, 2008. On January 21, 2010, his appeal of cassation was rejected by the Court of Cassation, finalizing his sentence.

The complicity of Fuhrmann and Remetter, two fellow Yenish people, in the kidnapping, murder and rape of Jeanne-Marie Kegelin was not retained, but the Attorney General demanded they receive sentences ranging from 3 to 30 years. The Kegelin family, defended by Wallerand de Saint-Just, denounced a "mess in the procedures that prevented their mourning". The lawyer also felt that "those who, by their spirit, their politics and their abstention, allowed the death of Jeanne-Marie Kegelin are much more responsible than Pierre Bodein."

On November 13, 2014, the European Court of Human Rights said that the conviction of Bodein did not violate Article 3 (the convicted person alleged that the sentence was inhumane and with degrading treatment), nor Article 6 (Bodein complained about the lack of motives of the cour d'assises' judges) of the European Convention of Human Rights.

== TV documentaries ==
- "Pierre Bodein, Pierrot le fou" in January 2006, October 2007 and June 2010 on Get the Accused presented by Christophe Hondelatte on France 2.
- " Pierrot le fou " (first report) in « ... in Alsace » on June 13 and 24, 2013 on Crimes on NRJ 12.
- "Pierrot le fou affair, autopsy of a murderous course" (first report) on February 7, 14 and 22, 2015 in Chronique Criminelles on NT1.
- "Pierre Bodein AKA 'Pierrot le fou'" on Crimes à l'Est on France 3.

== See also ==
=== Related articles ===
- List of rampage killers

=== External links ===
- INA archive, French TV newscast on July 5, 2004, duration: 2 minutes and 22 seconds
- INA archive, France 2 newscast on April 10, 2007, duration: 2 minutes and 16 seconds
- INA archive, France 3 newscast on June 21, 2007, duration: 1 minute and 53 seconds
- INA archive, France 2 newscast on July 11, 2007, duration: 2 minutes and 24 seconds
