= Ludivine Chambet =

French serial killer

- Born: 10 May 1983 (age 43); France
- Other name: "The Poisoner of Chambéry"
- Conviction: Murder
- Penalty: 25 years imprisonment + 10 years of involuntary commitment

Details
- Victims: 10
- Span of crimes: 2012–2013
- Country: France
- State: Auvergne-Rhône-Alpes

Ludivine Chambet (born 10 May 1983) is a French serial killer and unlicensed nursing assistant, who murdered people in a retirement home near Chambéry. She was prosecuted for poisoning 13 elderly people between September 2012 and November 2013, resulting in the deaths of 10 victims. On 23 May 2017, she was sentenced to 27 years' imprisonment.

== Early life ==
Ludivine Chambet, then aged 34, was a former caregiver in the Chambéry hospital, initially working in various nursing homes around Jacob-Bellecombette in Savoie. Described as kind and without any prior criminal history, on 27 June 2013, a tragedy occurred that changed her life: the death of her mother from leukaemia. The loss affected Ludivine greatly as she was very close to her mother and was constantly protected by her, and she became extremely fragile. Her depression was exacerbated by her unfulfilling social life. Gradually her mental state declined, resulting in the poisonings, administered to the elderly through containers. Because of this, she earned the nickname "The Poisoner of Chambéry". On 12 December 2013, she was indicted for poisoning and attempted poisoning.

== Murders ==
On 27 November 2013, a resident of the Accommodation Facility for Dependent Elderly People (EHPAD) suddenly fell into a coma and died quickly after hospitalization. Toxicological tests revealed the presence of drugs such as neuroleptics and antidepressants, which were not part of the treatment. The death of this resident followed other similar cases of elderly people, also residents of the EHPAD, who died quickly for unexplained reasons. Aged from 76 to 96 years, they had no threats to their life and had no desire to shorten their lives. After a review of the staff schedule, Chambet was revealed to have been present with the victims sometime before their deaths.

== Trial ==
=== Conduct ===
On 9 May 2017, Ludivine Chambet appeared before the cour d'assises of Savoie. According to Olivier Sotty, the police captain who conducted the investigation, this was "an exceptional case considering the number of victims". Members of the jury tried to understand the reasons behind the acts, but Chambet would remember things for only a short period of time before blacking out. She said to a civil party lawyer that her brain was "mixed, overturned, turned upside down". Throughout the two-week trial, Ludivine constantly repeated that she had just wanted to "relieve them, soothe them".

According to the magistrate, "it wasn't about euthanasia, as the retirement home was not a deathbed, and Ludivine Chambet was perfectly aware of what she was doing by administering her drug cocktails. She dares to say that she did not want to kill them, and just wanted to appease them. But Ludivine Chambet is dangerous, even with her little girlish ways. The horror of the case is indisputable. These are serial murders. However, the psychiatrists believe that the impassive air of Ludivine Chambet did not reveal a murderous nature in this woman, but, to the contrary, the fragility and psychic immaturity of her mind".

=== Conviction ===
On 23 May 2017, her trial began. After considering the request of the Advocate General for a sentence of 30 years, and after six hours of deliberation, the jury of the cour d'assises of Savoie recognized Chambet as guilty of "administering psychotropic drugs to the elderly". She was sentenced to 25 years, in addition to a socio-judicial follow-up of 10 years in a psychiatric ward, along with the revoking of her medical license. When the verdict was returned, a sense of relief was in the courtroom, but there was also tension on the victims' families' side, much less than at the beginning of the trial, but still palpable.

== See also ==
- List of serial killers by number of victims
