= List of mass shootings in France =

This is a list of known mass shootings that have occurred in France. Mass shootings are firearm-related incidents with at least four casualties. As of April 2026, 813 people have been killed and 1,082 people have been wounded in 278 shootings, with a total of 1,889 casualties (including perpetrator/s).

== 21st century ==
=== 2020s ===
| Date | Location | Dead | Injured | Total | Description |
|---|---|---|---|---|---|
| 23 October 2026 | Trappes & La Verrière, Île-de-France | 1 | 7 | 8 | 2026 Trappes and La Verrière shootings: A man went on a racially-motivated shooting spree in the communes of Trappes and La Verrière, killing a man of African origin and injuring seven others. |
| 6 September 2026 | Cayenne, French Guiana | 0 | 4 | 4 | A shootout at a nightclub left four people wounded. |
| 30 August 2026 | Marseille, Provence-Alpes-Côte d'Azur | 1 | 4 | 5 | A man was killed and four other people were injured in a drive-by shooting. |
| 4 August 2026 | Valence, Auvergne-Rhône-Alpes | 0 | 6 | 6 | Six people were injured when a shooter opened fire from a car. |
| 17 July 2026 | Carcassonne, Occitania | 1 | 4 | 5 | A shooter fired from a car, fatally wounding a woman and injuring four other people. |
| 9 July 2026 | Marseille, Provence-Alpes-Côte d'Azur | 0 | 4 | 4 | Three gunmen shot and wounded four people sitting in the terrace of a snack bar in the 15th arrondissement. |
| 30 June 2026 | Capesterre-Belle-Eau, Guadeloupe | 2 | 4 | 6 | Two women were killed and four people were injured, including a child, outside a bar. |
| 26 May 2026 | Grenoble, Auvergne-Rhône-Alpes | 1 | 3 | 4 | Four people were shot, one fatally, by shooters in a vehicle. |
| 11 May 2026 | Nice, Alpes-Maritimes | 2 | 6 | 8 | Two people were killed and six others were injured, three critically, in a drive-by shooting at Place des Amaryllis. |
| 9 May 2026 | Villers-en-Arthies, Île-de-France | 4 (Note: Including the perpetrator) | 0 | 4 | A police officer shot his ex-wife and two children dead before killing himself. |
| 28 March 2026 | Le Diamant, Martinique | 0 | 4 | 4 | Four people were wounded during a party on a beach. |
| 19 March 2026 | Livry-Gargan, Île-de-France | 0 | 4 | 4 | Four people were shot and wounded. A handgun was recovered near the scene. |
| 4 November 2025 | Loon-Plage, Hauts-de-France | 0 | 5 | 5 | Five people were wounded by gunfire at a migrant camp. |
| 3 October 2025 | Nice, Provence-Alpes-Côte d'Azur | 2 | 5 | 7 | Two people were killed and five others were injured in a shooting. An investigation into intentional homicide by an organized gang and attempted intentional homicide by an organized gang was opened. |
| 20 September 2025 | Châlons-en-Champagne, Grand Est | 0 | 4 | 4 | Four men were shot and wounded by unknown attackers. |
| 9 September 2025 | Le Vauclin, Martinique | 2 | 4 | 6 | Two people were killed and four others wounded in a shooting at a rented home. |
| 27 June 2025 | Nîmes, Occitania | 0 | 6 | 6 | Three people shot from two vehicles at a group of individuals, wounding six, including four teenagers. |
| 22 June 2025 | Goult, Provence-Alpes-Côte d'Azur | 2 | 3 | 5 | Four assailants opened fire at a wedding, killing the bride and wounding three other people, including the husband and their child. One of the assailants also died. |
| 14 June 2025 | Loon-Plage, Hauts-de-France | 1 | 5 | 6 | A man and a teenager were arrested after a person was killed and five other people wounded in a shooting at a migrant camp. |
| 1 May 2025 | Grenoble, Auvergne-Rhône-Alpes | 0 | 4 | 4 | Two men opened fire on a group of four men standing around an area known for drug trafficking, wounding them, before fleeing by electric scooter. |
| 9 January 2025 | Saint-Esprit, Martinique | 2 | 2 | 4 | Two people were killed and two people were wounded on the D5 road. |
| 24 December 2024 | Fort-de-France, Martinique | 1 | 3 | 4 | A shootout left a man dead and three other people wounded in the Terres-Sainville neighbourhood. |
| 23 December 2024 | Ajaccio, Corsica | 1 | 6 | 7 | A 40-year-old convict fired at a man he had a dispute with in a bar, killing the man and wounding six bystanders. |
| 14 December 2024 | Loon-Plage, Hauts-de-France | 5 | 0 | 5 | 2024 Nord Department killings: Five people were killed between Loon-Plage and Wormhout by a 22-year-old man armed with four weapons. The man later turned himself in. |
| 3 November 2024 | Fort-de-France, Martinique | 2 | 3 | 5 | Multiple shooters burst into an apartment and shot and killed a woman and a teenager and wounded three other children before fleeing. |
| 31 October 2024 | Poitiers, Nouvelle-Aquitaine | 1 | 4 | 5 | A 15-year-old boy was fatally shot and four other people were wounded in a drug-related shooting. A 25-year-old man surrendered to police in Paris on 5 November and was charged with the crime. |
| 28 September 2024 | Marseille, Provence-Alpes-Côte d'Azur | 2 | 4 | 6 | A shooter fired a rifle at people sitting outside a shisha bar, killing two and wounding four. |
| 12 August 2024 | Échirolles, Auvergne-Rhône-Alpes | 0 | 4 | 4 | Shots from a passing vehicle wounded four people lingering at a location known for drug trafficking. |
| 13 July 2024 | Espinasse-Vozelle, Auvergne-Rhône-Alpes | 4 | 4 | 8 | A man opened fire at a party, killing three people and wounding four others. The shooter killed himself. |
| 29 June 2024 | Thionville, Grand Est | 1 | 5 | 6 | Several gunmen exited a vehicle and shot at people gathered outside a wedding, leaving one dead and five wounded. The incident was related to drug trafficking, according to police. |
| 14 May 2024 | Incarville, Normandy | 2 | 3 | 5 | Gunmen opened fire on a prison escort, killing two officers and wounding three others. Convicted robber and accused murderer Mohamed Amra was freed by the shooters. |
| 3 May 2024 | Sevran, Île-de-France | 1 | 4 | 5 | A man was killed and four people wounded in a parking lot. Police said it was connected to drug trafficking. |
| 16 April 2024 | Nîmes, Occitania | 0 | 5 | 5 | People in a car fired on people outside an apartment building, wounding five. |
| 20 February 2024 | Yaté, New Caledonia | 2 | 5 | 7 | Two people were killed and five others were wounded in two connected shootings relating to a conflict between clans. |
| 26 January 2024 | Fort-de-France, Martinique | 0 | 4 | 4 | Four people were wounded in a targeted shooting. |
| 8 January 2024 | Bastia, Corsica | 4 | 0 | 4 | A gunman killed four people in an apartment in a drug-related attack. |
| 11 November 2023 | Marseille, Provence-Alpes-Côte d'Azur | 2 | 3 | 5 | Two people were killed and three others wounded outside a McDonald's restaurant. |
| 29 October 2023 | Pont-Saint-Esprit, Occitania | 2 | 2 | 4 | A group of people shot at a café terrace from a car, killing two people and injuring two others. |
| 17 September 2023 | Bobigny, Île-de-France | 0 | 5 | 5 | Five people were wounded by a gunman on a scooter. |
| 18 June 2023 | Le Gosier, Guadeloupe | 1 | 4 | 5 | Five people were found shot along a road, one of whom died of his injuries in hospital. |
| 15 June 2023 | Fort-de-France, Martinique | 2 | 3 | 5 | Two people were killed and three others were wounded when shots were fired at a bar. |
| 12 June 2023 | Marseille, Provence-Alpes-Côte d'Azur | 0 | 4 | 4 | Four people were wounded in front of a bar. |
| 6 June 2023 | Grenoble, Auvergne-Rhône-Alpes | 0 | 6 | 6 | Six people were wounded during a fight that escalated into a shooting. |
| 2 June 2023 | Trappes, Île-de-France | 0 | 4 | 4 | Four people were injured by shots from a handgun. |
| 1 June 2023 | Nantua, Auvergne-Rhône-Alpes | 1 | 3 | 4 | One person was killed and three other people wounded when a gunman opened fire at a bar. |
| 22 May 2023 | Marseille, Provence-Alpes-Côte d'Azur | 0 | 6 | 6 | Six people were injured in the 15th arrondissement. |
| 13 May 2023 | Villerupt, Grand Est | 0 | 5 | 5 | Five people were shot and wounded by a masked gunman, who then fled. |
| 20 April 2023 | Aix-en-Provence, Provence-Alpes-Côte d'Azur | 0 | 4 | 4 | Four people were wounded, including one teenager, when a shooter opened fire on a bar from outside. |
| 17 April 2023 | Marseille, Provence-Alpes-Côte d'Azur | 0 | 4 | 4 | Four people, including a teenager, were wounded by gunfire near a police station. |
| 4 April 2023 | Noisy-le-Sec, Île-de-France | 0 | 4 | 4 | Four people were injured in a background of drug trafficking. |
| 2 April 2023 | Marseille, Provence-Alpes-Côte d'Azur | 0 | 5 | 5 | Five people were wounded by gunfire in the 2nd arrondissement. |
| 22 January 2023 | Saint-Brieuc, Brittany | 3 | 1 | 4 | A man shot and killed his girlfriend and their three-year-old daughter and wounded the girlfriend's mother before killing himself. |
| 1 January 2023 | Paris, Île-de-France | 0 | 4 | 4 | A security guard shot and wounded four people at a nightclub in the 13th arrondissement. |
| 24 December 2022 | Baie-Mahault, Guadeloupe | 1 | 5 | 6 | A man was killed and five other people were wounded in a housing development. |
| 23 December 2022 | Paris, Île-de-France | 3 | 4 | 7 | 2022 Paris shooting: Three Kurds were killed and three others were wounded in the 10th arrondissement. A 69-year-old suspect was arrested with injuries and confessed to the crime with racist motives. |
| 12 November 2022 | Saint-Laurent-du-Maroni, French Guiana | 0 | 4 | 4 | Four people were wounded by multiple shooters. |
| 11 November 2022 | Rivière-Salée, Martinique | 0 | 6 | 6 | Eight people were injured, six by gunfire, during a concert. |
| 30 August 2022 | Loon-Plage, Hauts-de-France | 0 | 9 | 9 | Shooters fired at migrants residing in a refugee camp, wounding nine people. |
| 18 July 2022 | Paris, Île-de-France | 1 | 4 | 5 | One person was killed and four others wounded by two gunmen at a hookah bar. |
| 17 July 2022 | Bouillante, Guadeloupe | 0 | 5 | 5 | Five people were found wounded by police responding to reports of gunfire. |
| 14 June 2022 | Lyon, Auvergne-Rhône-Alpes | 2 | 2 | 4 | Two people were killed and two others wounded in the 9th arrondissement. |
| 11 May 2022 | Lyon, Auvergne-Rhône-Alpes | 1 | 3 | 4 | Shots were fired into a car in the 7th arrondissement, with one death and three injuries. |
| 24 March 2022 | Baie-Mahault, Guadeloupe | 1 | 3 | 4 | Four people were discovered shot, one of whom later died. |
| 9 August 2021 | Perpignan, Occitania | 1 | 3 | 4 | One person was killed and three other people wounded in a drug-related shooting. |
| 2 January 2021 | Bordeaux, Nouvelle-Aquitaine | 1 | 4 | 5 | A 16-year-old was killed and four other people were wounded when an automatic weapon was fired at a group of youths in a public square. |
| 23 December 2020 | Saint-Just, Auvergne-Rhône-Alpes | 4 | 1 | 5 | 2020 Saint-Just shooting: A man killed three police officers and wounded another as they responded to a domestic violence call. He fled and later killed himself. |
| 3 October 2020 | Saint-Ouen-sur-Seine, Île-de-France | 0 | 4 | 4 | Four people were injured outside city hall. |
| 27 August 2020 | Villeurbanne, Auvergne-Rhône-Alpes | 0 | 4 | 4 | Four people were injured outside a tobacco bar when two suspects fired at them from a vehicle. |
| 25 July 2020 | Nîmes, Occitania | 1 | 3 | 4 | A man was killed and three other people wounded in a shooting in the parking lot of a nightclub. |
| 27 May 2020 | Saint-Varent, Nouvelle-Aquitaine | 4 | 1 | 5 | A man shot and killed three co-workers and wounded another at a quarry before killing himself. |
| 11 March 2020 | Toulouse, Occitania | 0 | 6 | 6 | A man shot and wounded six security guards before being arrested. |
| 9 February 2020 | Matoury, French Guiana | 0 | 5 | 5 | A gunman opened fire in front of a restaurant, wounding five people. |

=== 2010s ===
| Date | Location | Dead | Injured | Total | Description |
|---|---|---|---|---|---|
| 17 November 2019 | Marseille, Provence-Alpes-Côte d'Azur | 1 | 5 | 6 | Shots were fired outside a grocery store in the 14th arrondissement. Police found two cars "riddled with bullets" and six people shot, one fatally. |
| 31 October 2019 | Marseille, Provence-Alpes-Côte d'Azur | 0 | 6 | 6 | A shooter opened fire at a bar with a shotgun, wounding six people before fleeing. |
| 27 October 2019 | Cayenne, French Guiana | 1 | 4 | 5 | Five people were shot, one fatally, in a gunfight stemming from an attempted robbery during a birthday party. |
| 28 July 2019 | Ollioules, Provence-Alpes-Côte d'Azur | 3 | 1 | 4 | Two groups of drug dealers opened fire on each other during a dispute. Two men and a bystander were killed and another bystander wounded. |
| 12 May 2019 | Amiens, Hauts-de-France | 0 | 6 | 6 | Six people were wounded at a local association. |
| 22 April 2019 | Ariège, Occitania | 3 | 1 | 4 | A man killed two family members and injured another person before killing himself at another location. |
| 21 April 2019 | Nantes, Pays de la Loire | 0 | 4 | 4 | Four people were injured outside a restaurant. |
| 30 January 2019 | Bastia, Corsica | 2 | 5 | 7 | A man shot and killed one person and wounded five others with a hunting rifle before committing suicide. |
| 1 January 2019 | Villeurbanne, Auvergne-Rhône-Alpes | 0 | 4 | 4 | Four people wounded by gunshots were dropped off at a Lyon hospital. |
| 11 December 2018 | Strasbourg, Grand Est | 5 | 11 | 16 | 2018 Strasbourg attack: An Islamic extremist attacked random people in the city center with a revolver and knife, killing five people and wounding eleven others. He was killed by police two days later. |
| 24 November 2018 | Dunkirk, Hauts-de-France | 0 | 4 | 4 | A café owner opened fire on four people outside the business, wounding them. |
| 21 November 2018 | Toulon, Provence-Alpes-Côte d'Azur | 1 | 4 | 5 | One man was killed and four other people were wounded by several gunmen armed with rifles. |
| 22 August 2018 | Strasbourg, Grand Est | 0 | 7 | 7 | Seven people were injured in Neuhof during a gunfight. |
| 2 August 2018 | Alençon, Normandy | 1 | 5 | 6 | One person was killed and ten others were wounded, five by gunfire, during a brawl. |
| 30 July 2018 | Beaune, Bourgogne-Franche-Comté | 0 | 7 | 7 | Seven people were injured in a drive-by shooting. |
| 10 May 2018 | Cayenne, French Guiana | 0 | 8 | 8 | Eight people were injured, including one of the shooters, in a shootout at a party organized by the Guianese Socialist Party. |
| 26 April 2018 | Colombes, Île-de-France | 0 | 4 | 4 | Two gunmen on a motorcycle shot and wounded four teenagers. |
| 23 March 2018 | Carcassonne/Trèbes, Occitania | 5 | 15 | 20 | Carcassonne and Trèbes attack: An Islamic extremist armed with a handgun and knife conducted two attacks in Trèbes, killing one person and wounding two others, then drove to a Super U supermarket, where he killed two people and wounded thirteen others before GIGN personnel killed him. |
| 1 February 2018 | Calais, Hauts-de-France | 0 | 5 | 5 | During a fight between Afghan and Eritrean migrants waiting for food handouts, an Afghan man shot and wounded five people, four of whom were left in critical condition. |
| 31 October 2017 | near Nouvion-et-Catillon, Hauts-de-France | 5 | 0 | 5 | A man shot and killed his wife and three children before killing himself. |
| 19 September 2017 | Sarcelles, Île-de-France | 4 | 3 | 7 | 2017 Paris shooting: A policeman killed three people and wounded three others at two locations before killing himself. |
| 10 September 2017 | Noyon, Hauts-de-France | 4 | 0 | 4 | A police officer shot and killed his wife and two of his children at Noyon station before killing himself. |
| 2 September 2017 | Cayenne, French Guiana | 0 | 4 | 4 | A man injured two women and two children with a rifle before being apprehended. |
| 6 August 2017 | Toulouse, Occitania | 1 | 3 | 4 | Occupants of two cars shot at each other, leaving one person dead and three others wounded. |
| 3 July 2017 | Toulouse, Occitania | 1 | 6 | 7 | A gunman shot from a scooter, killing one person and wounding six others. |
| 2 July 2017 | Avignon, Provence-Alpes-Côte d'Azur | 0 | 8 | 8 | Eight people were wounded by gunshots near a mosque. |
| 20 April 2017 | Paris, Île-de-France | 2 | 3 | 5 | April 2017 Champs-Élysées attack: An Islamic extremist shot into a National Police vehicle and killed one officer and wounded two others. He then fired at people as he fled, wounding a tourist before being killed by police. |
| 16 March 2017 | Grasse, Provence-Alpes-Côte d'Azur | 0 | 4 | 4 | Grasse school shooting: A student inspired by the Columbine High School massacre opened fire at the Tocqueville high school, wounding three students and the principal before being arrested. |
| 26 October 2016 | Bussière-Dunoise, Nouvelle-Aquitaine | 0 | 4 | 4 | A man opened fire on police as they arrived to evict him, wounding four people, including two officers and two neighbors, before being arrested. |
| 29 July 2016 | Pointe-à-Pitre, Guadeloupe | 0 | 15 | 15 | Two men fired from a scooter during a neighbourhood party, wounding fifteen people, including five children. |
| 21 June 2016 | Anglet, Nouvelle-Aquitaine | 4 | 0 | 4 | A man took his wife and two daughters hostage in a tanning salon he and his wife operated, eventually killing them in a triple murder–suicide. |
| 5 June 2016 | Aubervilliers, Île-de-France | 0 | 4 | 4 | Four men were shot and wounded by multiple shooters. |
| 17 April 2016 | Cayenne, French Guiana | 2 | 9 | 11 | Two people were killed and nine others wounded at a bar in the Chinese village quarter. |
| 2 April 2016 | Marseille, Provence-Alpes-Côte d'Azur | 3 | 3 | 6 | Three people were killed and three others wounded during a gang dispute. |
| 24 February 2016 | Nice, Provence-Alpes-Côte d'Azur | 0 | 4 | 4 | Four people were wounded in a drive-by shooting. |
| 14 January 2016 | Marseille, Provence-Alpes-Côte d'Azur | 0 | 6 | 6 | Six people were shot at a grocer's shop. |
| 6 December 2015 | Le Lamentin, Martinique | 3 | 2 | 5 | Multiple assailants fired shots at a nightclub, killing three people and wounding two others. |
| 13 November 2015 | Paris, Île-de-France | 130 | 356+ | 456+ | November 2015 Paris attacks: Multiple shooters opened fire at cafés and restaurants as another team of gunmen attacked the Bataclan theatre. Hundreds of people were shot and 130 killed before the shooters, motivated by Islamic extremism, killed themselves or were killed by police. |
| 13 September 2015 | Marseille, Provence-Alpes-Côte d'Azur | 1 | 5 | 6 | A member of a gang was expelled from a restaurant. In revenge, one of the gang members fired randomly into the terrace, killing a security guard and wounding five other people. |
| 25 August 2015 | Roye, Picardy | 4 | 4 | 8 | 2015 Roye shooting: A man motivated by anti-ziganism opened fire and shot four people, killing three, in a Roma camp. He shot and killed one responding police officer and wounded another before being shot and arrested. |
| 23 June 2015 | Pierrefitte-sur-Seine, Île-de-France | 0 | 4 | 4 | Two people were found wounded by gunshots. Two others, including a 15-year-old, arrived at hospital with gunshot wounds connected to the same incident. |
| 20 June 2015 | Dives-sur-Mer, Normandy | 4 | 0 | 4 | A man shot and killed his wife, daughter, and 5-year-old grandson with a hunting rifle in two houses before killing himself. |
| 30 May 2015 | Metz, Grand Est | 1 | 4 | 5 | An intoxicated man returned with a gun after an argument with a group of people and killed a woman and injured two other people. He also shot and wounded a bystander and grazed a fifth person. The gunman was later arrested. |
| 9 January 2015 | Paris, Île-de-France | 5 | 9 | 14 | Hypercacher kosher supermarket siege: An Islamic extremist attacked a Hypercacher kosher supermarket and killed four people and wounded nine others before being shot dead by police. |
| 7 January 2015 | Paris, Île-de-France | 12 | 11 | 23 | Charlie Hebdo shooting: Two brothers and Islamic extremists killed twelve people and injured eleven others at the headquarters of satirical newspaper Charlie Hebdo. The shooters fled and were killed by police two days later. |
| 1 January 2015 | Sainte-Catherine, Hauts-de-France | 4 | 2 | 6 | A man with a history of domestic violence shot and killed his wife at a house party and also shot four other guests, two fatally. The shooter killed himself in Arras following a police pursuit. |
| 1 December 2014 | Villeurbanne, Auvergne-Rhône-Alpes | 1 | 3 | 4 | A shooter fired into a bar, killing a 62-year-old man and wounding three other people. |
| 25 November 2014 | Le Moule, Guadeloupe | 0 | 4 | 4 | Police found four people wounded by gunfire. |
| 3 July 2014 | Marseille, Provence-Alpes-Côte d'Azur | 0 | 5 | 5 | A gunman with a shotgun fired into a crowd during a barbecue, wounding five people. |
| 31 May 2014 | Avignon, Provence-Alpes-Côte d'Azur | 1 | 4 | 5 | A shooter fired at a group of people from a car, killing one and wounding four. |
| 21 January 2014 | Toulouse, Midi-Pyrénées | 1 | 3 | 4 | Four people were shot, one fatally, in a shootout. |
| 13 January 2014 | Sainte-Anne, Martinique | 2 | 6 | 8 | Two men were killed and six other people wounded at a garden party. |
| 15 October 2013 | Nouméa, New Caledonia | 1 | 3 | 4 | An upset man opened fire on his friends at a party, wounding two, one fatally. He then shot at people around, wounding another two. |
| 14 October 2013 | Bordeaux, Nouvelle-Aquitaine | 3 | 2 | 5 | A man shot and killed his two sons and wounded his wife and daughter before walking outside and fatally shooting himself. |
| 3 July 2013 | Silvareccio, Corsica | 3 | 1 | 4 | Two men were killed and two others wounded when shots were fired into their moving vehicle. One of the wounded men died of his injuries nearly a month later. |
| 21 May 2013 | Baie-Mahault, Guadeloupe | 0 | 19 | 19 | Two gunmen shot into a crowd at a wake for the man killed in the 12 May Les Abymes shooting, wounding nineteen people. |
| 12 May 2013 | Les Abymes, Guadeloupe | 1 | 3 | 4 | A man was killed and three passengers slightly wounded when a gunman fired into a car. |
| 12 May 2013 | Schœlcher, Martinique | 1 | 5 | 6 | After an argument, a 20-year-old man was killed and four other people wounded at a birthday party. One of the alleged perpetrators was also injured. |
| 5 May 2013 | Cul-de-Sac, Saint Martin | 1 | 7 | 8 | A man was killed and seven other people wounded during a fish festival. |
| 25 April 2013 | Istres, Provence-Alpes-Côte d'Azur | 3 | 1 | 4 | A man randomly shot at people and cars while walking down the street, killing three and wounding one before being arrested. |
| 28 December 2012 | Le Blanc-Mesnil, Île-de-France | 4 | 0 | 4 | A man shot and killed his wife and two children before killing himself. |
| 1 December 2012 | Sète, Occitania | 2 | 2 | 4 | A man shot four neighbors, killing two, after a dispute. He fled and was later arrested. |
| 23 November 2012 | Orly, Île-de-France | 2 | 3 | 5 | Five people were shot and two were killed outside a bar. |
| 23 September 2012 | Bobigny, Île-de-France | 0 | 5 | 5 | Five people were wounded by rifle fire during a dispute. |
| 5 September 2012 | near Chevaline, Auvergne-Rhône-Alpes | 4 | 1 | 5 | Annecy shootings: Four people were shot to death and another person wounded at a rest area. The crime remains unsolved. |
| August 2012 | Fort-de-France, Martinique | 0 | 4 | 4 | Four people were wounded in a parking lot. |
| 8 July 2012 | Bertry, Hauts-de-France | 0 | 10 | 10 | An intoxicated man opened fire after being expelled from a nightclub, slightly wounding ten people. He was later arrested. |
| 1 July 2012 | Lille, Hauts-de-France | 2 | 5 | 7 | A man kicked out of a nightclub returned and opened fire, killing two people and wounding five others before fleeing. The shooter was arrested with an accomplice in Spain on 6 July. |
| 14 April 2012 | Neuvy-Saint-Sépulchre, Centre-Val de Loire | 0 | 6 | 6 | Six people were wounded in a public square. |
| March 2012 | Toulouse/Montauban, Midi-Pyrénées | 8 | 11 | 19 | Toulouse and Montauban shootings: Islamic extremist Mohammed Merah, responsible for three previous murders and another attempted murder, opened fire on faculty and students at a Jewish day school, killing a rabbi and three students and wounding four other students. Merah was killed by police in a siege on 22 March, in which he wounded six officers. |
| 21 January 2012 | Maripasoula, French Guiana | 6 | 0 | 6 | Six illegal miners were killed in a shootout at a remote mining camp. |
| 4 December 2011 | Englos, Nord-Pas-de-Calais | 0 | 4 | 4 | After an argument between a woman, her current partner, and her ex-partner at a shopping mall, the current partner fired a shotgun at the ex-partner, wounding him and three bystanders. The shooter fled the area and was arrested at a traveller's camp. |
| 23 November 2011 | Colombes, Île-de-France | 0 | 4 | 4 | Four people were injured outside a library. |
| 14 September 2011 | Tremblay-en-France, Île-de-France | 2 | 4 | 6 | A gunman with two firearms killed two people and wounded four others in the Grand-Ensemble neighbourhood. |
| 4 September 2011 | Fort-de-France, Martinique | 0 | 5 | 5 | A man known to the police shot and wounded a man. He also injured four police officers before being apprehended. |
| August 2011 | Algajola, Corsica | 4 | 0 | 4 | A man shot and killed his wife and two children before killing himself. The bodies were discovered in advanced decomposition on 29 August. |
| April 2011 | Nantes, Pays de la Loire | 5 | 0 | 5 | Dupont de Ligonnès murders and disappearance: Five family members were discovered shot to death at their house. The father of the family disappeared around the same time and is the prime suspect. |
| 3 March 2011 | Rivesaltes, Occitania | 3 | 3 | 6 | A man wounded his mistress and her friend with a pistol before shooting randomly in the street, killing three people. He shot himself, but survived. |
| 9 January 2011 | Bayonne, Nouvelle-Aquitaine | 1 | 3 | 4 | A man shot at people inside a laundromat, killing one person and wounding three others. He was disarmed by a civilian and arrested. |
| 17 November 2010 | Amilly/Rouvray-Saint-Florentin, Centre-Val de Loire | 4 | 0 | 4 | A man shot and killed a couple at their home, then returned to his house and killed his wife and himself. |
| 8 November 2010 | Châteaubernard, Nouvelle-Aquitaine | 4 | 0 | 4 | A man opened fire at a recycling center, killing two employees and a customer before shooting himself. He died in January 2013 of his injuries. |
| 22 August 2010 | Ajaccio, Corsica | 0 | 5 | 5 | Two gunmen ran into a nightclub and opened fire, wounding five people. The shooters fled. |
| 21 June 2010 | Paris, Île-de-France | 2 | 3 | 5 | Two gunmen killed two people and injured three others in the 18th arrondissement. |
| 22 May 2010 | Fort-de-France, Martinique | 1 | 4 | 5 | Two people fired from a motorcycle at people on the street, killing one and wounding four. |
| 20 May 2010 | Villiers-sur-Marne, Île-de-France | 1 | 4 | 5 | During a police chase on the A4 autoroute, the pursued criminals shot and killed an officer and injured four other people. |

=== 2000s ===
| Date | Location | Dead | Injured | Total | Description |
|---|---|---|---|---|---|
| 1 December 2009 | Saint-Jean-d'Angély, Nouvelle-Aquitaine | 2 | 5 | 7 | A man opened fire with a shotgun at a pétanque club, killing one person and wounding five others. The shooter committed suicide at his son's house. |
| 25 October 2009 | Pont-Aven, Brittany | 0 | 5 | 5 | A man with a rifle wounded five people, including his two children and three police officers, before being apprehended. |
| 9 October 2009 | Le Raincy, Île-de-France | 5 | 0 | 5 | A man shot and killed four neighbours, including a pregnant woman, before killing himself. |
| 12 August 2009 | Albitreccia, Corsica | 4 | 0 | 4 | A 16-year-old killed his parents and two brothers with a shotgun. |
| 14 April 2009 | Cabanac, Occitania | 4 | 0 | 4 | A police officer shot and killed his wife and two children before fatally shooting himself. |
| 27 January 2009 | Marseille, Provence–Alpes–Côte d'Azur | 3 | 2 | 5 | Three people were killed and two others wounded in the 14th arrondissement. |
| 23 August 2008 | Pointe-à-Pitre, Guadeloupe | 0 | 4 | 4 | A criminal shot four people, injuring them, in the street. |
| 10 July 2008 | La Magdelaine-sur-Tarn, Occitania | 6 | 0 | 6 | A man shot and killed his two brothers, his two sons, and the girlfriend of one of his sons before shooting himself. He died five days later. |
| 29 June 2008 | Carcassonne, Occitania | 0 | 17 | 17 | An army sergeant accidentally fired shots during a ceremony conducted by the 3rd Marine Infantry Parachute Regiment, wounding seventeen people. |
| 28 April 2008 | Bretignolles-sur-Mer, Pays de la Loire | 3 | 1 | 4 | A man shot his sister and sister-in-law to death and wounded his ex-wife before killing himself. |
| 15 April 2008 | Sainte-Rose, Guadeloupe | 0 | 4 | 4 | A man shot and wounded four people. |
| 31 October 2007 | Grenoble, Auvergne-Rhône-Alpes | 2 | 3 | 5 | Two people were killed and three others injured in a gang-related drive-by shooting. |
| 4 April 2006 | Marseille, Provence-Alpes-Côte d'Azur | 3 | 2 | 5 | Three people were killed and two others wounded at a brasserie. |
| 30 July 2005 | Saint-Georges-sur-Loire, Pays de la Loire | 5 | 0 | 5 | A man shot and killed his partner and her three children before killing himself at a farmstead. |
| 21 July 2005 | Bessan, Languedoc-Roussillon | 0 | 4 | 4 | A man shot and wounded four people as a result of a local quarrel. He killed himself in jail. |
| 30 May 2005 | Marignane, Provence-Alpes-Côte d'Azur | 1 | 9 | 10 | A group of men shot and killed a man and injured nine other people at a bar. |
| 20 January 2005 | Ampuis, Auvergne-Rhône-Alpes | 4 | 0 | 4 | A man killed his wife, mother-in-law, and son at multiple residences. He killed himself the following day. |
| 26 November 2004 | Pantin, Île-de-France | 0 | 6 | 6 | Six people were injured at a shopping mall. |
| 27 October 2004 | Ancourteville-sur-Héricourt, Normandy | 3 | 1 | 4 | A 14-year-old boy shot and killed his parents and 4-year-old brother and wounded his 11-year-old sister. |
| 5 March 2004 | Antony, Île-de-France | 0 | 4 | 4 | Two gunmen carrying a rifle and revolver shot and wounded four people in a housing estate. |
| 11 April 2003 | Le Grand-Bornand, Auvergne-Rhône-Alpes | 5 | 0 | 5 | Flactif family murders: David Hotyat shot and killed his landlord and the landlord's wife and three children. He burned their bodies in the forest and was arrested in September after DNA analysis linked him to the bodies. |
| 13 October 2002 | Vertheuil, Nouvelle-Aquitaine | 1 | 5 | 6 | A man opened fire on four hunters intruding on his property, causing them to fire back. In the gunfight, one hunter was killed and three hunters and two family members of the original gunman were wounded. Six people were arrested. |
| 4 October 2002 | Dunkirk, Nord-Pas-de-Calais | 1 | 3 | 4 | A man motivated by racism opened fire on a bar frequented by North African immigrants, killing one person and wounding three others before being arrested. |
| 14 July 2002 | Nice, Provence-Alpes-Côte d'Azur | 0 | 4 | 4 | A burglar fought with officers at a hospital, causing the burglar to take control of one of the officer's guns and open fire, wounding two medical personnel and a police officer. Officers fired back, wounding the shooter, who was arrested nearby. |
| 27 March 2002 | Nanterre, Île-de-France | 8 | 19 | 27 | Nanterre massacre: A man opened fire at a town hall, killing eight people and wounding nineteen others. He killed himself in custody. |
| 4 January 2002 | Pisieu, Auvergne-Rhône-Alpes | 5 | 0 | 5 | A man shot and killed his wife and three children before killing himself. |
| 29 October 2001 | Tours, Centre-Val de Loire | 4 | 8 | 12 | A man opened fire with a rifle in downtown Tours, killing four people and wounding seven others before being shot by police and arrested. |
| 19 October 2001 | Oyonnax, Auvergne-Rhône-Alpes | 2 | 3 | 5 | A man shot and killed his wife and one of his daughters and wounded his two other daughters before attempting suicide. |
| 16 October 2001 | Le Plessis-Trévise, Île-de-France | 2 | 2 | 4 | As police responded to a house where Jean-Claude Bonnal and four accomplices were robbing the owners and holding them hostage, Bonnal shot and killed two officers and wounded a third officer and one of his accomplices. |
| 6 October 2001 | Athis-Mons, Île-de-France | 4 | 0 | 4 | Jean-Claude Bonnal and two accomplices robbed a bar and shot and killed the two owners and two employees. |
| 11 August 2001 | Cergy-Pontoise, Île-de-France | 3 | 6 | 9 | A man killed three people and wounded six others in a bank robbery. |
| 7 January 2001 | Narbonne/Valras-Plage, Occitania | 5 | 0 | 5 | A fugitive shot and killed a witness in the gunman's trial for a previous murder and also killed two policemen responding to the scene. The gunman killed another witness in Valras before fleeing to his girlfriend's apartment in Béziers. He killed himself the following week when police entered the apartment. |
| 23 October 2000 | Châteauroux, Centre-Val de Loire | 4 | 0 | 4 | A man killed his wife and three children before dying in a fire he set. |
| 27 August 2000 | Anor, Hauts-de-France | 5 | 0 | 5 | A man shot dead his wife and four children before dying in a fire he set. |
| 5 August 2000 | Bastia, Corsica | 4 | 1 | 5 | A cabaret customer returned with a pistol after being expelled and shot five people, killing four of them. |
| 23 June 2000 | Villemomble, Île-de-France | 1 | 3 | 4 | Police investigating an armoured van robbery exchanged gunfire with the perpetrators at their hideout. One criminal was killed and three others wounded. |
| 21 April 2000 | Évry, Île-de-France | 0 | 5 | 5 | Five people were injured by a man and his sister-in-law. |

== 20th century ==
=== 1990s ===
| Date | Location | Dead | Injured | Total | Description |
|---|---|---|---|---|---|
| 6 September 1999 | near Le Verger, Brittany | 4 | 0 | 4 | A man shot and killed four neighbors with a rifle at multiple homes. |
| 14 May 1999 | Vauvert, Occitania | 0 | 5 | 5 | A man shot and wounded five people during riots. |
| 12 May 1999 | Fontaine-Chalendray, Nouvelle-Aquitaine | 5 | 0 | 5 | A woman shot and killed her husband, three children, and herself. |
| 6 September 1998 | Herserange, Grand Est | 4 | 0 | 4 | A man opened fire in his residence, killing his roommate and three visitors. |
| 17 June 1998 | Audierne, Brittany | 5 | 0 | 5 | A gendarme used his service weapon to kill his wife, two sons, and his mother-in-law at his barracks before killing himself. |
| 26 May 1998 | Saint-Denis, Île-de-France | 1 | 3 | 4 | One person was killed and three others injured at a restaurant. |
| 5 August 1997 | Saint-Didier, Brittany | 5 | 1 | 6 | A man opened fire on his mistress and her family, wounding her and killing her father, mother, and brother. He then killed two gendarmes responding to the scene and was arrested as he tried to kill a third with a cutlass. |
| 4 May 1997 | Chaponost, Auvergne-Rhône-Alpes | 1 | 4 | 5 | Four masked men opened fire with shotguns at a party, killing one person and wounding four others. Six suspects were apprehended. |
| 6 March 1997 | Pellouailles-les-Vignes, Pays de la Loire | 0 | 4 | 4 | Four gendarmes were injured when they were fired upon by robbers at an Intermarché supermarket. |
| 24 October 1996 | Montélimar, Auvergne-Rhône-Alpes | 1 | 7 | 8 | A man attacked a hunter with a machete before wounding him with his own rifle. He then went into the streets and shot at responding police officers, killing one and wounding five, before being struck by return fire and arrested. |
| 16 April 1996 | Ajaccio, Corsica | 2 | 3 | 5 | During a shootout between members of the National Liberation Front of Corsica and police officers, a criminal and an officer were killed and two officers and a second criminal wounded. |
| 26 January 1996 | Amiens, Picardy | 4 | 0 | 4 | A police officer shot and killed her daughter and two sons with her service weapon before killing himself. |
| 16 December 1995 | near Saint-Pierre-de-Chérennes, Auvergne-Rhône-Alpes | 16 | 0 | 16 | 1995 Vercors massacre: Two members of the Order of the Solar Temple shot and killed fourteen people before killing themselves. |
| 24 September 1995 | Cuers, Var | 16 | 4 | 20 | 1995 Cuers shooting: A 16-year-old boy killed fifteen people and wounded four others, mostly through shooting, before killing himself. |
| 30 May 1995 | Saint-Andéol-le-Château, Auvergne-Rhône-Alpes | 4 | 0 | 4 | Saint-Andéol massacre: A man shot and killed four in-laws before setting their home on fire. |
| 26 February 1995 | Louveciennes, Île-de-France | 6 | 0 | 6 | Louveciennes massacre: A 16-year-old shot and killed his father, stepmother, the stepmother's parents, and two family friends. He confessed to the murders after originally attempting to portray them otherwise. |
| 26 December 1994 | Marignane, Provence-Alpes-Côte d'Azur | 4 (Note: Including the 4 perpetrators) | 9 | 13 | Raid on Air France Flight 8969: GIGN personnel assaulted an Air France plane that had been hijacked by Armed Islamic Group of Algeria militants and landed at Marseille Provence Airport. Nine operators were wounded and the four perpetrators killed during the raid. |
| 13 November 1994 | Sainte-Marie, Réunion | 9 | 1 | 10 | A 35-year-old man shot his family and neighbours with two pump-action shotguns, killing eight people and injuring one other, before killing himself. |
| 4 October 1994 | Paris, Île-de-France | 5 | 2 | 7 | Rey-Maupin affair: After stealing firearms from police officers, a woman and her boyfriend carjacked a taxi driver, who then deliberately rammed a police car to attract attention from law enforcement to his situation. The two perpetrators shot and killed two officers and the taxi driver and wounded a third policeman before conducting another carjacking. The boyfriend killed one policeman and injured another before being fatally shot by police; his girlfriend was arrested. |
| 16 July 1994 | Dreux, Centre-Val de Loire | 1 | 10 | 11 | A group of gunmen opened fire after a dispute. Ten people were injured, and one of the shooters was killed by a police officer. |
| 25 June 1994 | Hyères, Provence-Alpes-Côte d'Azur | 2 | 2 | 4 | A man with a shotgun opened fire outside a nightclub as police attempted to arrest him, killing an officer and wounding a second officer and a bystander before being shot and wounded by the injured officer. |
| 12 July 1993 | Metz, Grand Est | 7 | 0 | 7 | Six people were found shot to death on a property owned by a scrap dealer, who is believed to have shot them due to personal grievances. The man killed himself at his sister's home the following day. |
| 8 January 1993 | Prévessin-Moëns, Auvergne-Rhône-Alpes | 4 | 0 | 4 | After beating his wife to death, Jean-Claude Romand shot and killed his two children, then went to his parents' house and killed them with a rifle. |
| 1 January 1993 | Wattrelos, Hauts-de-France | 1 | 7 | 8 | A man shot and wounded three family members, three police officers, and a television cameraman before killing himself. |
| 1 July 1992 | Besançon, Bourgogne-Franche-Comté | 7 | 5 | 12 | Besançon shooting: A man opened fire at his former workplace, killing six people and wounding five others before killing himself. |
| 24 December 1990 | Avignon, Provence-Alpes-Côte d'Azur | 1 | 3 | 4 | Gang members opened fire on targets at a circus, striking four bystanders and killing one of them. |
| 11 May 1990 | La Courneuve, Île-de-France | 1 | 4 | 5 | A man barricaded in his apartment shot and wounded four responding police officers before they fired back, killing him. |
| 27 February 1990 | Chavannes-sur-Reyssouze/Pont-de-Vaux, Auvergne-Rhône-Alpes | 3 | 1 | 4 | A man shot and killed his mother and a doctor attending to her and non-fatally stabbed a neighbour responding to the scene. He then went to Pont-de-Vaux and shot two people randomly, killing one, before being subdued by a bystander and arrested. |

=== 1980s ===
| Date | Location | Dead | Injured | Total | Description |
|---|---|---|---|---|---|
| 31 August 1989 | Ris-Orangis, Île-de-France | 2 | 3 | 5 | A man barricaded in his home shot and killed two police officers with a rifle and injured two others before being wounded and arrested. |
| 12 July 1989 | Luxiol, Bourgogne-Franche-Comté | 14 | 9 | 23 | Luxiol massacre: A farmer killed fourteen people and wounded eight others during a shooting spree before being wounded by police and arrested. He was found not guilty by reason of insanity. |
| 23 August 1988 | Perpignan, Occitania | 2 | 3 | 5 | Two jewelry store robbers were confronted by officers; one of them fired on the police, killing two officers and wounding two others. The shooter was wounded by police and arrested with his accomplice. |
| 22 April 1988–5 May 1988 | Ouvéa, New Caledonia | 25 | 2 | 27 | Ouvéa cave hostage taking: Members of the Kanak and Socialist National Liberation Front killed four gendarmes and took hostages, barricading themselves in a cave. During a raid by GIGN and other operators, two team members and nineteen hostage takers were killed and another team member and a hostage injured. |
| 12 August 1986 | Lespéron, Auvergne-Rhône-Alpes | 3 | 6 | 9 | A man shot and wounded five of his neighbours before going to another location and fatally shooting two women and wounding another. The gunman was unaccounted for for around a year before his remains were discovered. |
| 30 July 1986 | Port-de-Bouc, Provence-Alpes-Côte d'Azur | 3 | 4 | 7 | Three people were killed and four others wounded in a shootout inside and outside a café. |
| 14 January 1986 | Paris, Île-de-France | 2 | 4 | 6 | Members of the Gang des postiches exchanged gunfire with police during a bank robbery, with an officer and a criminal being killed and three officers and a hostage wounded. |
| 26 December 1985 | Le Puy-en-Velay, Auvergne-Rhône-Alpes | 2 | 6 | 8 | A man opened fire at neighbors after being angered by noise from a party, killing two people and wounding six others before being arrested. |
| 19 December 1985 | Strasbourg, Grand Est | 2 | 5 | 7 | A man fired on people inside and outside a restaurant, killing one and wounding three. He then shot and wounded two pursuing policemen at a nearby building before killing himself. |
| 25 September 1985 | Bayonne, Nouvelle-Aquitaine | 4 | 1 | 5 | Monbar Hotel attack: A Spanish-sponsored death squad shot and killed four people and wounded another as they targeted members of the Basque terrorist group ETA. |
| 19 June 1985 | Ille-et-Vilaine/Cotes-du-Nord, Brittany | 7 | 5 | 12 | Dol massacre: A man killed seven people and wounded five others as he drove around shooting at family members, acquaintances, and random people. He was stopped by police and arrested. |
| 19 May 1985 | Nogent-le-Phaye, Centre-Val de Loire | 1 | 7 | 8 | After a fight outside a discotheque, a man shot into a crowd, injuring seven people. The shooter, a fugitive murderer, killed another man as he chased the perpetrator and two accomplices. On 21 May, the shooter was arrested in Pyrénées-Orientales. |
| 5 December 1984 | Hienghène, New Caledonia | 10 | 5 | 15 | As members of the Kanak and Socialist National Liberation Front returned home, anti-independence settlers ambushed them with gunfire, killing ten of them and injuring five others. |
| 11 November 1984 | Châteaubriant, Pays de la Loire | 2 | 5 | 7 | 1984 Châteaubriant shooting: A far-right extremist targeting Turkish people shot seven people, killing two, before being arrested. |
| 21 November 1983 | Lyon, Auvergne-Rhône-Alpes | 5 | 3 | 8 | An Algerian migrant worker killed five people and wounded three others as he fired a rifle from a hostel. |
| November 1983 | Paris, Île-de-France | 0 | 4 | 4 | Four women were shot and wounded in a road rage incident in the 10th arrondissement. |
| 5 August 1983 | Avignon, Provence-Alpes-Côte d'Azur | 7 | 0 | 7 | Sofitel massacre: Several robbers shot and killed seven people at a hotel. |
| 3 November 1982 | Metz, Grand Est | 2 | 5 | 7 | A man wounded two workers on his roof, then fired at pedestrians, killing one person and wounding three others. The shooter was killed by a police sniper after a fifteen-hour siege. |
| 4 October 1982 | Bazas/Cadillac-sur-Garonne, Nouvelle-Aquitaine | 3 | 5 | 8 | A former mental patient opened fire at the houses of psychiatric hospital employees who had cared for him years before, killing a doctor and guard and wounding five other people before killing himself the following day. |
| 10 September 1982 | Paris, Île-de-France | 1 | 4 | 5 | A man purchased a shotgun in the 12th arrondissement and shot and killed one pedestrian and wounded three others before being shot by police and arrested. |
| 9 August 1982 | Paris, Île-de-France | 6 | 22 | 28 | Chez Jo Goldenberg restaurant attack: Palestinian terrorists killed six people and wounded 22 others at a Jewish restaurant. |
| 23 July 1981 | Pont-de-Roide-Vermondans, Auvergne-Rhône-Alpes | 7 | 0 | 7 | A man killed his ex-wife, her boyfriend, two friends, and three colleagues at multiple locations before killing himself. |
| 17 January 1981 | Monpazier, Nouvelle-Aquitaine | 1 | 3 | 4 | After killing his estranged wife, a man shot at first responders, wounding two officers and a firefighter. He surrendered after a standoff. |
| 5 August 1980 | Lyon, Auvergne-Rhône-Alpes | 0 | 4 | 4 | 1980 Turkish Consulate attack in Lyon: Four people were shot and wounded by two Armenian gunmen at a Turkish consulate. |
| 17 January 1980 | Champdieu, Auvergne-Rhône-Alpes | 0 | 7 | 7 | A man fired at police officers and firefighters responding to his house, injuring seven. He died in a fire that he intentionally set. |

=== 1970s ===
| Date | Location | Dead | Injured | Total | Description |
|---|---|---|---|---|---|
| 5 June 1979 | Briare, Centre-Val de Loire | 3 | 6 | 9 | A man shot and killed a neighbour and his wife and wounded six other people, including a gendarme, before being killed by police. |
| 8 March 1979 | Denain, Hauts-de-France | 0 | 7 | 7 | A shooter wounded seven police officers during a demonstration by steelworkers. |
| 25 December 1978 | Paris, Île-de-France | 5 | 0 | 5 | A man shot and killed his wife, three children, and the family dog, then called police and killed himself. |
| 31 October 1978 | Caen, Normandy | 0 | 4 | 4 | A security guard shot at a group of teenagers he was angry with, wounding four of them. |
| 3 October 1978 | Marseille, Provence–Alpes–Côte d'Azur | 10 | 0 | 10 | Marseille bar massacre: Three gunmen entered and killed ten people at a bar. |
| January 1977 | near Lyon, Auvergne-Rhône-Alpes | 4 | 0 | 4 | A man shot and killed his parents and grandmother before fatally shooting himself. |
| June 1976 | Saint-Maur/Ivry, Île-de-France | 3 | 4 | 7 | A man shot five people at a restaurant with a rifle, killing one, then fled to a shipping company, where he killed two people. He surrendered later. |
| 23 February 1976 | Paris, Île-de-France | 6 | 0 | 6 | A man with financial problems killed five of his family members before killing himself. The shooter claimed in a note that the killings were a suicide pact. |
| 15 April 1975 | Avignon, Provence-Alpes-Côte d'Azur | 5 | 0 | 5 | Five people were shot dead at a café. |
| 4 December 1974 | Lille, Hauts-de-France | 3 | 6 | 9 | A man shot and killed two co-workers and strangled his wife to death before wounding six people at random from his home. He then killed himself. |
| 31 March 1973 | Marseille, Provence-Alpes-Côte d'Azur | 4 | 2 | 6 | Four people were killed and two others wounded in a gang-related shooting at a bar. |
| 28 November 1972 | Paris, Île-de-France | 1 | 3 | 4 | A man killed his father and wounded his sister and a friend of his. He was shot by police and arrested after firing shots at them. |
| 26 November 1972 | Saint-Salvy-de-la-Balme, Occitania | 3 | 2 | 5 | A farmworker opened fire at his workplace, killing two people and wounding two others. The shooter also died in the attack. |
| 4 October 1972 | Angoulême, Nouvelle-Aquitaine | 5 | 5 | 10 | A recently discharged mental patient killed five people, including three children, and wounded five others at a jewelry store. |
| 25 January 1972 | Rubercy, Normandy | 1 | 6 | 7 | A man shot and wounded two water company employees who had come to collect bills, then wounded four responding police officers before they shot back and killed him. |
| 8 June 1971 | Marseille, Provence–Alpes–Côte d'Azur | 1 | 4 | 5 | A man barricaded himself in a gun store and shot randomly, wounding four people before killing himself. |
| 14 March 1971 | Valenciennes, Hauts-de-France | 6 | 2 | 8 | A man armed with a rifle shot at his family members, killing five people and wounding two children, then killed himself. |
| 7 September 1970 | Lyon, Rhône-Alpes | 0 | 7 | 7 | During a twelve-hour siege, a man barricaded in his house with his children shot at police, wounding six officers and a television cameraman before his employer persuaded him to surrender. |
| March 1970 | Les Mureaux, Île-de-France | 2 | 2 | 4 | A man shot three police officers with a shotgun, killing one, before shooting himself to death. |

=== 1960s ===
| Date | Location | Dead | Injured | Total | Description |
|---|---|---|---|---|---|
| 25 December 1968 | Marseille, Provence-Alpes-Côte d'Azur | 4 | 0 | 4 | A man shot and killed his wife and three daughters before being arrested. |
| 17 November 1967 | Gueugnon, Bourgogne-Franche-Comté | 2 | 2 | 4 | A worker on long-term sick leave opened fire at his company's doctor's office, killing the doctor and a social worker and wounding another person. The shooter went to another doctor's office, where police shot and arrested him after he shot at them. |
| 12 June 1965 | Cancon, Nouvelle-Aquitaine | 3 | 1 | 4 | A farmer killed two neighbours with a rifle before exchanging gunfire with police, wounding one officer, whose partner shot the gunman dead. |
| 13 May 1965 | Jonzac, Nouvelle-Aquitaine | 5 | 0 | 5 | A man shot and killed his brother, sister, sister-in-law, and brother-in-law during an inheritance dispute at a department store. The shooter fatally shot himself following a standoff. |
| 4 November 1963 | Paris, Île-de-France | 1 | 6 | 7 | Four criminals and four police officers exchanged gunfire along the Boulevard du Montparnasse, killing a criminal and wounding four officers and two criminals. |
| 2 December 1961 | Metz, Grand Est | 1 | 3 | 4 | Gunmen killed one person and wounded three at a café. |
| 1 January 1960 | Paris, Île-de-France | 4 | 1 | 5 | Four people were killed and another wounded by automatic gunfire. |

=== 1950s ===
| Date | Location | Dead | Injured | Total | Description |
|---|---|---|---|---|---|
| 16 September 1959 | Paris, Île-de-France | 2 | 8 | 10 | After injuring a prostitute in the 3rd arrondissement, a man opened fire on pursuers and bystanders, killing a teenager and injuring seven other people. A police officer shot the gunman, who died in hospital. |
| 20 September 1958 | Lyon, Rhône-Alpes | 0 | 6 | 6 | Six people were wounded by National Liberation Front members in a drive-by shooting outside a police station. |
| 4 May 1958 | Chauny, Hauts-de-France | 5 | 2 | 7 | A café owner killed his girlfriend's father, a 3-year-old girl, his estranged wife, and another man before barricading himself in his business and shooting at police, wounding two people. The shooter was found dead after a six-hour standoff. |
| 31 December 1956 | Paris, Île-de-France | 3 | 10 | 13 | Three people were killed and ten others wounded when gunmen opened fire at two cafés in an attack likely related to the Algerian War. |
| 17 August 1953 | Moisenay, Île-de-France | 4 | 0 | 4 | A man killed his mother, sister, and 6-year-old nephew with a rifle before killing himself. |
| 4 September 1952 | Auxi-le-Château, Hauts-de-France | 3 | 1 | 4 | A man shot and killed two people and wounded a police officer before being shot and killed by police. |

=== 1940s ===
| Date | Location | Dead | Injured | Total | Description |
|---|---|---|---|---|---|
| 11 June 1945 | Dieppe, Normandy | 15 | 9 | 24 | A drunken soldier, armed with a pistol, killed 15 people and wounded nine others. He was captured after being wounded. He was subsequently court-martialed, sentenced to death, and executed. |

=== 1930s ===
| Date | Location | Dead | Injured | Total | Description |
|---|---|---|---|---|---|
| 10 February 1939 | Paris, Île-de-France | 4 | 0 | 4 | A man shot and killed his wife and two sons before killing himself. |
| 21 March 1936 | Saint-Hilaire, Auvergne-Rhône-Alpes | 3 | 4 | 7 | A man armed himself with three revolvers and opened fire at a sanatorium, killing two people and wounding four others before being killed by armed citizens. |
| 22 December 1935 | Toul, Grand Est | 3 | 1 | 4 | A soldier shot randomly inside a barracks, killing two soldiers and injuring another. The gunman was killed by other soldiers after they broke down a barricade he had placed. |
| 6 January 1935 | Lanester, Brittany | 3 | 3 | 6 | A gunman killed two of his neighbours and wounded three others as they celebrated Epiphany. He shot himself dead after unsuccessfully searching for another target. |
| 9 October 1934 | Marseille, Provence-Alpes-Côte d'Azur | 7 | 15 | 22 | Assassination in Marseilles: A gunman opened fire on Alexander I of Yugoslavia during a procession. He, Louis Barthou, and three others were killed, with fifteen people injured. The shooter was beaten by police and civilians and died later that day. |
| 25 September 1934 | Marseille, Provence-Alpes-Côte d'Azur | 3 | 5 | 8 | Three people were killed and five other people were wounded at a café during a political dispute. |
| 24 August 1931 | Comines, Hauts-de-France | 2 | 6 | 8 | Eugène Vanhove, armed with a rifle and a revolver, opened fire on passengers at a train station, killing two people and wounding six others. He was subdued by citizens as he attempted to flee. |
| 20 December 1930 | Perpignan, Occitania | 4 | 4 | 8 | A Senegalese soldier killed three people and wounded four others before killing himself. |

=== 1920s ===
| Date | Location | Dead | Injured | Total | Description |
|---|---|---|---|---|---|
| 14 June 1926 | Toulon, Provence-Alpes-Côte d'Azur | 4 | 2 | 6 | A Senegalese soldier with a rifle killed two other soldiers and two civilians and wounded a fifth soldier before being shot and apprehended. |
