= Albert Foulcher =

The Albert Foulcher case is a French criminal case in which insurer Albert Foulcher was accused of murdering André Meffray, a former insurer who was shot five times by a Dan Wesson firearm in 1993. In this case, Foulcher, who was the prime suspect, denied the facts during his custody and detention on remand. Being free before his trial, he did not appear and ran away. He was sentenced to life imprisonment in absentia. It was during his trip that he distinguished himself on 8 January 2001 near Narbonne, where he killed four people in the same day. First was Pascal Herrero, the husband of a former mistress. Then there were two policemen and finally Maurice Michaud, the insurer he thought was in cahoots with Meffray. Until 17 January, during his run, he became public enemy number 1. At that date, he hid in the apartment of his mistress Isabelle Susic in the district of Grangette in Béziers. But cornered by the police and RAID, he committed suicide by shooting himself in the head. The police eventually found his body in the early morning after entering the apartment. Foulcher is still legally considered innocent because of his death which has extinguished the public action.

== Murder of André Meffray ==
=== Facts ===
On 21 January 1993, in Pailhès (near Béziers), André Meffray was about to dine, but heard the doorbell ring around 20:30. He went to open the door and once outside, five shots sounded; André collapsed to the ground. The killer fled by car. Gendarmes were alerted by neighbours.

=== Investigation ===
Upon arrival, the gendarmes noticed that Meffray was shot with five large calibre bullets. The shots were grouped on Meffray's body, suggesting that the killer was mastering the shooting technique. In addition, neighbours saw the killer. Unclear descriptions were established by witnesses (wearing a cap, brown jacket) and none of them were able to draw a facial composite of the killer. But investigators knew that the killer's car was dark in color with red side protection strips.

On 26 January 1993 André Meffray's autopsy was performed. The medical examiner said the bullets were fired up and down. This is all the more blatant because his body was found on the third step to the path going to the gate was sloping and the latter went to his residence trying to escape. In addition, the killer had to be within two meters of the victim. The bullets found in Meffray's body were sent to the IRCGN's laboratories. After the findings made on these projectiles, it was determined that 22 possible weapons could be used for this crime.

The first track was made by the press at the same time, settling of accounts followed one another in the sector. Indeed, there were murders committed in Marseillan-Plage and Nîmes. The most disturbing thing was that these executions took place around 20:00 and made with heavy weapons.

That's when the gendarmes tried to find out more about the life of André Meffray. They discovered that he was a retired insurer and that he was doing financial investment counseling to round up the end of the month. And he had taken over his old business a little by taking over clients with risky investments. Thus the second track lead to a dissatisfied customer who wanted revenge. Because of this investment, his capital has fallen. Finally, the third track led to an unhappy competitor who sought revenge. This hypothesis was reinforced by the progress of the search for the murder weapon. All gunsmiths in the area were asked to search among their customers, those who possess one or more the 22 types of weapons possible.

It is then that an armorer of Béziers told a story to the gendarmes. He told the investigators that one day a person came to his store with a special collection weapon (Dan Wesson) to have it neutralized. The person wanted to be in good standing without possession of a weapon, as nobody could have a weapon of such category at home. But the salesman felt that he was not dealing with a collector or member of a shooting club. He thought that this neutralization would not continue and that the weapon was going to be put back into activity. That's when the salesman gave the person's name to the investigators. The man with the Dan Wesson was called Albert Foulcher.

In investigating this person, the gendarmes discovered that he did not have a good reputation in Mr. Meffray's environment. And since he had a Dan Wesson (the probable murder weapon), the investigators favoured this lead, especially since Foulcher was also an insurer and did not have professional relationships with Meffray. Indeed, Foulcher complained that Mr. Meffray was withdrawing clients from him to send them to other insurers and he was holding Meffray responsible for the failure of his insurance firm. Eventually, Foulcher threw in the towel and he became unemployed. It became more and more likely for the investigators that he was angry with André Meffray. It is then that Albert Foulcher was placed under surveillance and that he became suspect number N°1.

== List of known victims ==
Date	Name	Age	Profession	Lieu
21 January 1993	André Meffray	64	Retired insurance agent	Pailhès
8 January 2001	Hervé Prior	40	Police Officer	Narbonne
8 January 2001	Patrick Rigaud	45	Police Officer	Narbonne
8 January 2001	Pascal Herrero	45	Insurance Agent	Narbonne
8 January 2001	Maurice Michaud	52	Insurance Agent	Narbonne

== Bibliography ==
- The Albert Foulcher Affair, Manuel Garcia, Claubert Publishing, November 2014 ISBN 979-1-091-73367-0.

== TV documentaries ==
- "Albert Foulcher, The Revenge of the Insurer" April 10, 2011, July 22, 2012 in Get the Accused presented by Christophe Hondelatte in France 2.
