= 2020 Saint-Just shooting =

Mass shooting in Saint-Just, France

- Location: Saint-Just, Puy-de-Dôme, France
- Date: December 23, 2020; ~00:00
- Attack type: Mass shooting
- Weapons: AR-15 semi-automatic rifle; 9mm Glock 17 semi-automatic pistol; 9mm Glock 19 semi-automatic pistol
- Deaths: 4 (including the perpetrator)
- Injuries: 1
- Assailant: Frédérik Limol
- Motive: Domestic violence

On 23 December 2020, a mass shooting occurred in Saint-Just, Puy-de-Dôme, France. Three members of the National Gendarmerie were fatally shot, and a fourth was injured.

== Incident ==
Shortly after midnight on 23 December 2020, two gendarmes went to a residence in response to domestic violence. The suspect, identified as 48-year-old Frédérik Limol, without warning fired shots killing a gendarme and injuring another. After Limol set his house on fire, he then shot and killed two more responding gendarmes. According to the Mayor of Saint-Just, François Chautard, Limol's house was destroyed by the fire. Limol crashed his car into a tree; he was found dead inside the car, having apparently committed suicide.

== Victims ==
The victims are assigned to National Gendarmerie, which is responsible for smaller towns and rural and suburban areas. The officers killed are identified as Cyrille Morel, age 45; Remi Dupuis, age 37; and Arno Mavel, age 21.

== Perpetrator ==
The shooter was identified as 48-year-old Frédérik Limol, a former soldier. He was heavily armed at the time of the incident, and attacked the officers with a military-style semi-automatic rifle. Limol escaped from the attack scene and committed suicide while crushing with his car against a tree.

== Reaction ==
The President of France Emmanuel Macron posted on his Twitter account, "They were intervening to rescue a woman who was the victim of domestic violence in Puy-de-Dôme, three gendarmes were killed, a fourth wounded. The Nation joins in the pain of families. To protect us, our forces act at the risk of their lives. They're our heroes." France's Minister of the Interior Gérald Darmanin said, "Last night, the National Gendarmerie lost three of its own, three of its soldiers led by the French service."
