= Loon-Plage =

- Commune
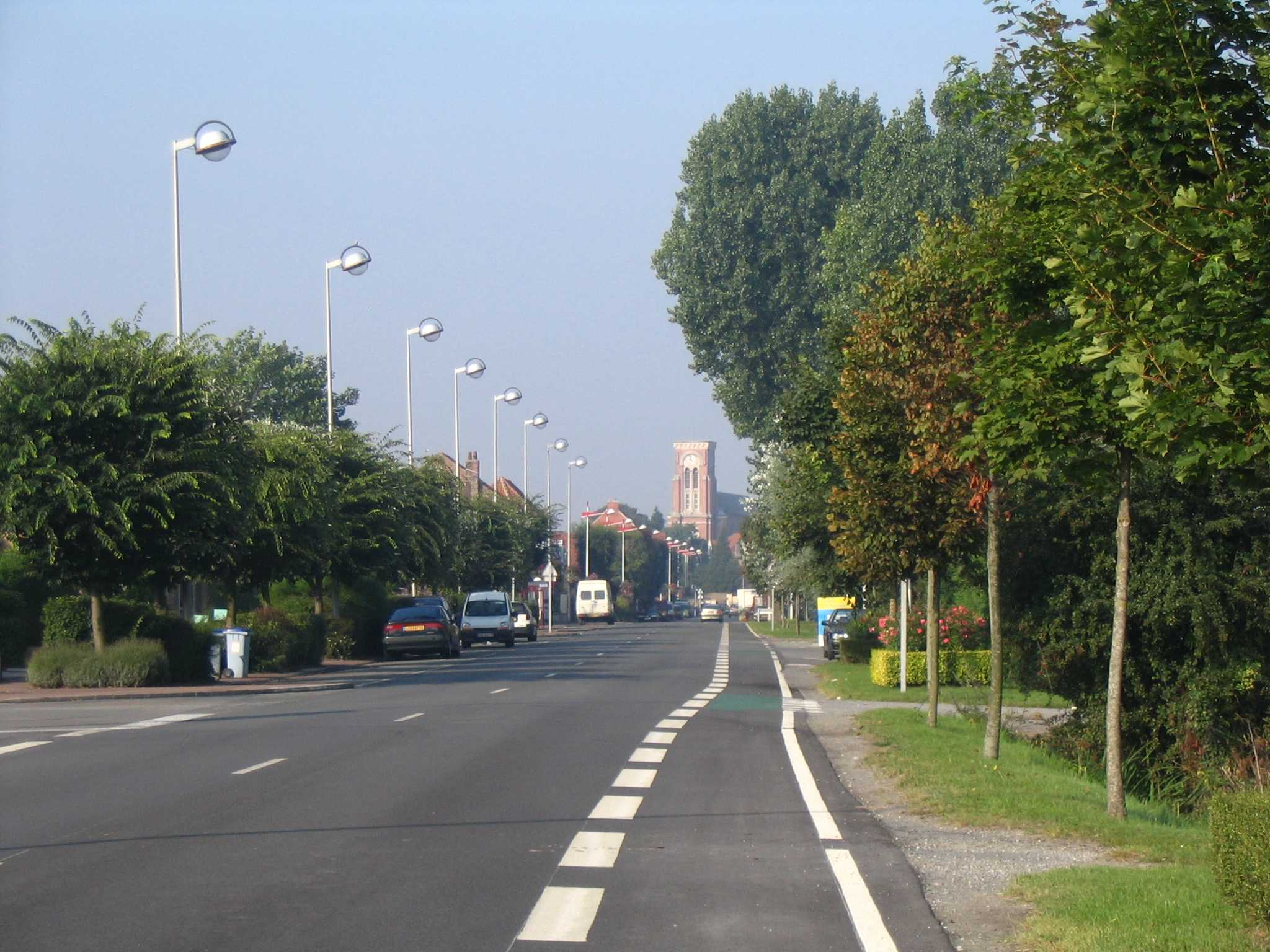
- A view within Loon-Plage

- Coat of arms
- Location of Loon-Plage
- Location within France Location within Hauts-de-France
- Coordinates: 50°59′41″N 2°13′14″E
- Country: France
- Region: Hauts-de-France
- Department: Nord
- Arrondissement: Dunkerque
- Canton: Grande-Synthe
- Intercommunality: CU Dunkerque

Government
  - Mayor (2020–2026): Éric Rommel
- Area^{1}: 35.67 km^{2} (13.77 sq mi)
- Elevation: 5 m (16 ft)
- Highest elevation: 25 m (82 ft)
- Lowest elevation: 0 m (0 ft)
- Population (2023): 5,952
  - Density: 166.9/km^{2} (432.2/sq mi)
- Demonym: Loonois(es)
- Time zone: UTC+01:00 (CET)
  - Summer (DST): UTC+02:00 (CEST)
- INSEE/Postal code: 59359 /59279
- ^{1} French Land Register data, which excludes lakes, ponds, glaciers > 1 km^{2} (0.386 sq mi or 247 acres) and river estuaries.

Loon-Plage (French pronunciation: [lon plaʒ]; Dutch: Loon) is a commune and major port in the Nord department in northern France. It serves as the main passenger port for the city of Dunkirk for ferries for England.

== Population ==
Historical population
Year	Pop.	±% p.a.
1968	4,370	—
1975	5,603	+3.61%
1982	5,482	−0.31%
1990	6,435	+2.02%
1999	6,510	+0.13%
2007	6,214	−0.58%
2012	6,293	+0.25%
2017	6,193	−0.32%
2023	5,952	−0.66%
Source: INSEE

== History ==
In 2024, a man shot dead 4 people here.

== Heraldry ==
Arms of Loon-Plage	The arms of Loon-Plage are blazoned : Argent billetty, a lion sable armed and langued gules. (Loon-Plage and Spycker use the same arms.)

== See also ==
- Communes of the Nord department
