= Roye, Somme =

Roye
- Commune
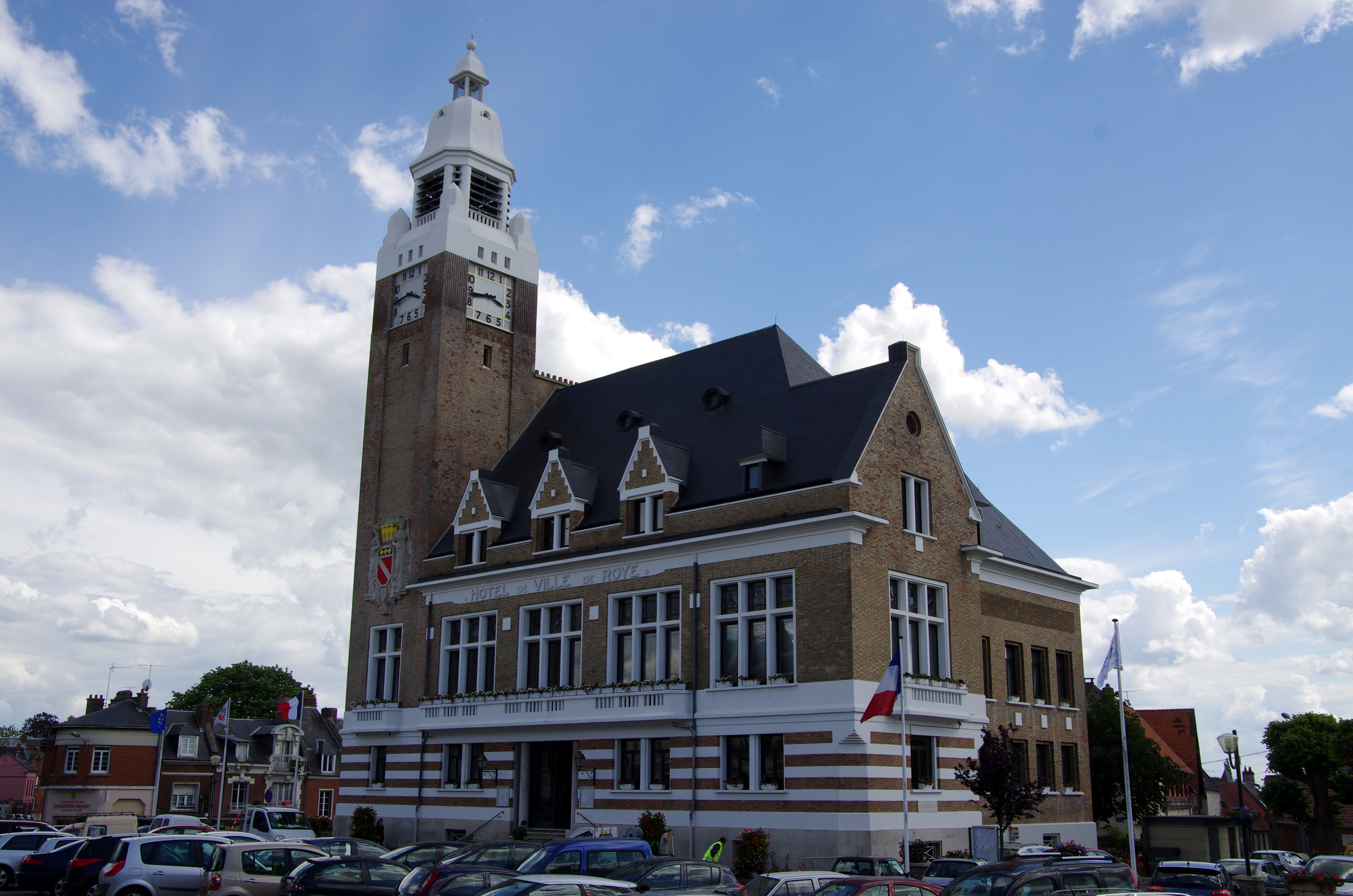
- The town hall in Roye

- Coat of arms
- Location of Roye
- Location within France Location within Hauts-de-France
- Coordinates: 49°42′03″N 2°47′28″E
- Country: France
- Region: Hauts-de-France
- Department: Somme
- Arrondissement: Montdidier
- Canton: Roye
- Intercommunality: CC Grand Roye

Government
  - Mayor (2022–2026): Delphine Delannoy
- Area^{1}: 15.55 km^{2} (6.00 sq mi)
- Elevation: 88 m (289 ft)
- Highest elevation: 96 m (315 ft)
- Lowest elevation: 67 m (220 ft)
- Population (2023): 5,833
  - Density: 375.1/km^{2} (971.5/sq mi)
- Time zone: UTC+01:00 (CET)
  - Summer (DST): UTC+02:00 (CEST)
- INSEE/Postal code: 80685 /80700
- ^{1} French Land Register data, which excludes lakes, ponds, glaciers > 1 km^{2} (0.386 sq mi or 247 acres) and river estuaries.

Roye (French pronunciation: [ʁwa]; Picard: Roé) is a commune in the Somme department in Hauts-de-France in northern France.

== Geography ==
Roye is situated at the junction of the A1 autoroute and the N17 road, on the banks of the Avre, some 30 miles (48 km) southeast of Amiens.

== Population ==
Historical population

Year	Pop.	±% p.a.
1926	5,309	—
1931	5,352	+0.16%
1936	4,956	−1.53%
1946	4,390	−1.21%
1954	4,635	+0.68%
1962	4,912	+0.73%
1968	5,211	+0.99%
1975	6,265	+2.67%

Year	Pop.	±% p.a.
1982	6,650	+0.86%
1990	6,333	−0.61%
1999	6,529	+0.34%
2007	6,233	−0.58%
2012	6,158	−0.24%
2017	5,786	−1.24%
2023	5,833	+0.13%

Source: EHESS and INSEE

== History ==
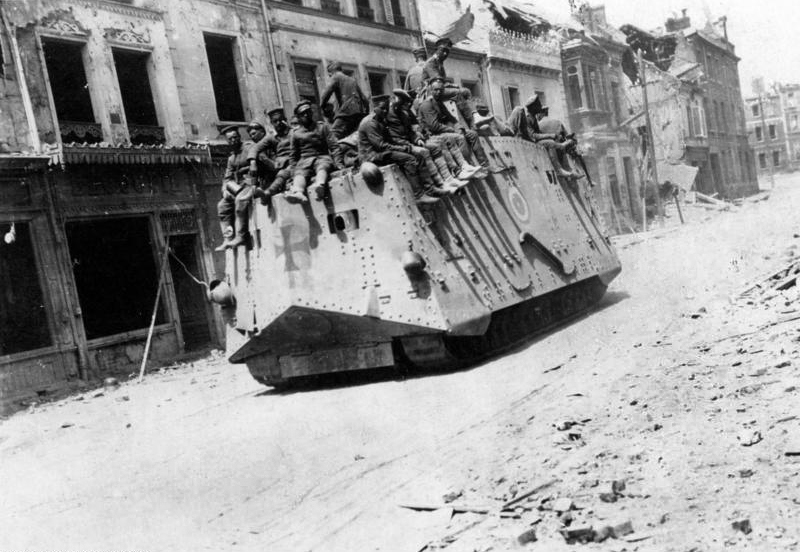
World War I German A7V tank at Roye, March 1918, during Operation Michael

- In 1634, religious refugees from Seville, Spain, known as the illuministes tried to establish themselves in France. They claimed to be inspired by celestial messages. Pierre Guérin, curate of Saint-Georges, was converted and himself created many disciples, called "les Guérinistes". The Catholic Church sought out and executed all of them by 1635.
- In 2015, a mass shooting took place in a Roma camp in which four people died.

== Places of interest ==
- Church of Saint Pierre. Rebuilt in concrete in 1930 after considerable damage during the First World War. The 12th century choir and apse and the 15th century stained-glass windows were all saved.
- The Hôtel de Ville (Town hall), built between 1775 and 1777 by the architect Pierre Dercheu was blown-up with dynamite by the retreating Germans on 17 March 1917. The new building, by local architect Arthur Régnier, was completed in 1932. It is reminiscent of the original by Dercheu.

== Personalities ==
- Gracchus Babeuf, a protagonist during the French Revolution was born nearby and lived and worked here.
- Pierre Guérin, an illuministe preacher. Curate of Saint-Georges church, Roye
- Abbot Jules Corblet (1819–1886), hagiographer for the diocese of Amiens.

== See also ==
- Communes of the Somme department
- Raymond Couvègnes
