= Bar du Téléphone massacre =

1978 Shooting in Marseille, France

- Location: 43.332°N 5.384°E; 14th arrondissement of Marseille, France
- Date: 3 October 1978; 8:10 pm
- Attack type: Mass shooting
- Deaths: 10
- Perpetrator: Unknown
- Motive: Unknown

The Bar du Téléphone massacre (French: Tuerie du Bar du Téléphone) also known as the Saint Gérard Massacre (French: Massacre de la Saint-Gérard; in reference to the Saint Valentine's Day Massacre) occurred on 3 October 1978 in Le Canet, Marseille, France. Three gunmen entered a bar and shot everyone present in the head, with the sole survivor being the owner's wife Nicole Léoni, who was in another room. The massacre was largely taken up by the French press at the time.

Police believed the attack to have been part of a gang war between rival organised crime gangsters led by Tony Zampa and opposing Jack le Mat. The killings were compared to the Saint Valentine's Day Massacre in the United States. Pierre Michel, the investigative judge in charge of the case, was himself shot dead on 21 October 1981. François Cecchi and François Girard, both gangsters of the 'French Sicilian Connection', were imprisoned for life for Michel's assassination.

The case was still ongoing when Michel was killed and so far remains unsolved, as nobody has ever been convicted for the massacre.

== See also ==
- Monbar Hotel attack
- Sofitel massacre
