= 2015 Roye shooting =

Mass shooting in Roye, Somme, France

- Roye (Picardy) Roye (France)
- Native name: Fusillade de Roye
- Location: 49.6981°N 2.7924°E; Roye, Somme, Picardy, France
- Date: 25 August 2015; 4:30 p.m. (UTC+2)
- Attack type: Mass shooting
- Weapon: 12-gauge Beretta semi-automatic shotgun
- Deaths: 4
- Injuries: 2
- Perpetrator: Marcel Ruffet
- Motive: Antiziganism, personal dispute
- Convictions: Murder; Attempted murder

The 2015 Roye shooting took place at 4.30 pm in a Roma camp in Roye (Somme, Picardy, France) on Tuesday, 25 August 2015 and saw the death of 4 people; a gendarme and three people from the same family, in addition to the serious wounding of a three-year-old child. The perpetrator, 73-year-old Marcel Ruffet, was shot and injured by the police as they carried out an arrest, and was later sentenced to 30 years imprisonment for multiple counts of murder and attempted murder. Ruffet expressed no regret for committing the shooting, citing hatred of Romanis.

== Shooting ==
At 4:30 p.m. on Tuesday, 25 August 2015, Marcel Ruffet, a 73-year-old, opened fire in a Roma camp in Roye, killing three (a six-month-old baby, his mother and his father), and also seriously wounding a three-year-old child. According to ballistics experts, he entered the caravan and shot at the children from a distance of less than three meters, shooting the baby in its cot.

The gendarmerie were dispactched in response to the shooting, and Ruffet returned fire. One of the gendarmerie, Laurent Pruvot, was shot and died instantly. Another officer was wounded. Police shot and injured Ruffet as they carried out his arrest. He was drunk at the time of the shooting. Those injured were all taken to the Amiens University Hospital by helicopter.

Ruffet was an alcoholic whose family had left him due to his aggression. A semi-automatic Beretta 12mm hunting rifle was used in the shooting. It is unknown how the weapon was obtained.

== Aftermath ==
Bernard Cazeneuve, then Minister of the Interior of France, denounced the shooting as "violence in its most barbaric form".

Ruffet was charged 28 August with murder and attempted murder. He was transferred to a prison where he continued to receive medical treatment for his injuries. He declined to speak when he appeared before the magistrate and initially refused to be assisted by a lawyer.

Ruffet was sentenced to 30 years imprisonment for multiple counts of murder and attempted murder. He expressed no regret for committing the shooting, citing hatred of Romanis, though he did express regret at the killing of the gendarme. In court, Ruffet insulted the families of his victims, saying that he wished he had shot more.

A few days after the shooting, protestors blocked a freeway over whether one of the sons of the victims, who was in prison, would be allowed to attend the funeral. The protestors were each sentenced to between four and 16 months in prison in February 2016.

The traveller camp was abandoned after the shooting. In 2019, Roye community delegates voted to shutter the site and construct a new area. The current area would be replaced by a police dog training facility.
