= 1984 Châteaubriant shooting =

Mass shooting in Châteaubriant, France

- Châteaubriant (France) Châteaubriant (Loire-Atlantique)
- Location: 17 rue de Couéré; Châteaubriant, Loire-Atlantique, France
- Date: 11 November 1984; 41 years ago 6:00 p.m. (GMT+1)
- Attack type: Mass shooting, far-right terrorism
- Weapon: Remington pump-action shotgun
- Deaths: 2
- Injuries: 5
- Perpetrator: Frédéric Boulay
- Motive: Anti-Turkish sentiment

On 11 November 1984, a mass shooting occurred in Châteaubriant, France. 23-year-old far-right extremist Frédéric Boulay opened fire on Turkish migrant workers, killing two people and wounding five others before being apprehended. He was sentenced to life imprisonment in 1985.

== Background ==
In the years before the attack, France shifted to the right politically. In the 1983 municipal elections, the far-right National Front defeated the left-wing coalition of the Socialist and Communist parties. Several crimes had occurred against minorities, such as the 1983 murder of Habib Grimzi.

A small group of Turks had lived and worked in Châteaubriant for around ten years before the shooting, constituting a group of 300 people. They were employed at the Huard foundry, which manufactured agricultural equipment. They were discriminated against by the population, and only two cafés accepted them as customers: the Huard foundry café and a café on rue de Couéré, opened by Turk Memduh Gürsoy in 1983.

== Shooting ==
On 11 November 1984, at 17 rue de Couéré in the town center of Châteaubriant, fifteen Turkish workers met at Memduh Gürsoy's café to have tea and play cards. At 6:00 p.m., Frédéric Boulay stood in front of the café, armed with a Remington pump-action shotgun and 20 cartridges designed for wild boar hunting. He fired seven shots toward the workers from the street; after the first shot, they used a table as protection from the gunfire, while some crawled on their stomachs in an attempt to take cover in the restroom. Boulay adjusted his aim towards the workers and continued firing, killing 40-year-old Salih Kaynar and 38-year-old Abdullah Yildiz. Five other diners were wounded.

Two patrolling gendarmes discovered Boulay reloading his weapon with bullets he had placed in a bag on his motorcycle, parked on the nearby rue de la Coquerie. After questioning him, they took Boulay into custody.

=== Reactions ===
On 12 November, a large crowd gathered in front of the café to pay tribute to the victims. Châteaubriant's then-deputy mayor, Xavier Hunault, convened a municipal council that assured its support for the Turkish community. On 14 November, a thousand high school students and many Huard employees gathered in the city center to demonstrate. That same day, another thousand people convened in Nantes at the behest of the anti-racist organization MRAP.

== Perpetrator ==
Frédéric Boulay, a 23-year-old butter factory worker who resided in Martigné-Ferchaud, was charged with murder and attempted murder. Although his brother-in-law was Tunisian, he followed Nazism and admired Adolf Hitler. On 10 November 1984, the day before the shooting, Boulay said that he listened to a speech by National Front leader Jean-Marie Le Pen.

=== Legal proceedings ===
On 28 September 1985, Boulay pleaded guilty in the Loire-Atlantique Cour d'assises. He stated that he did not regret his crimes and that "France may be a land of asylum, but it is not a dumping ground. I believe that I have served my country." He also said that he loathed foreigners for holding jobs despite his unemployment. He was sentenced to life imprisonment after thirty minutes of deliberation. A Le Monde journalist described Boulay's attitude as "indifferent and haughty." The prosecutor stated that his character contained the "shame of us all." Before the judge, Boulay stated, "today this country is putting me in prison, but everything can change. In five or six years, there will be an extreme right regime where foreigners will rule the roost."

=== Escape ===
After being transferred to Lannemezan prison in southern France, Boulay escaped prison in November 1989. He escaped justice for three months before being arrested in Grabels for planning a robbery. One year later, he escaped prison by helicopter with four accomplices. Aged 28, he was apprehended in Zaragoza on 6 November 1990.

== Memorials ==
A commemorative plaque is placed at the site of the shooting. On the 30th anniversary of the shooting, a remembrance ceremony took place.
