= Flactif family murders =

2003 mass murder in Le Grand-Bornand, France

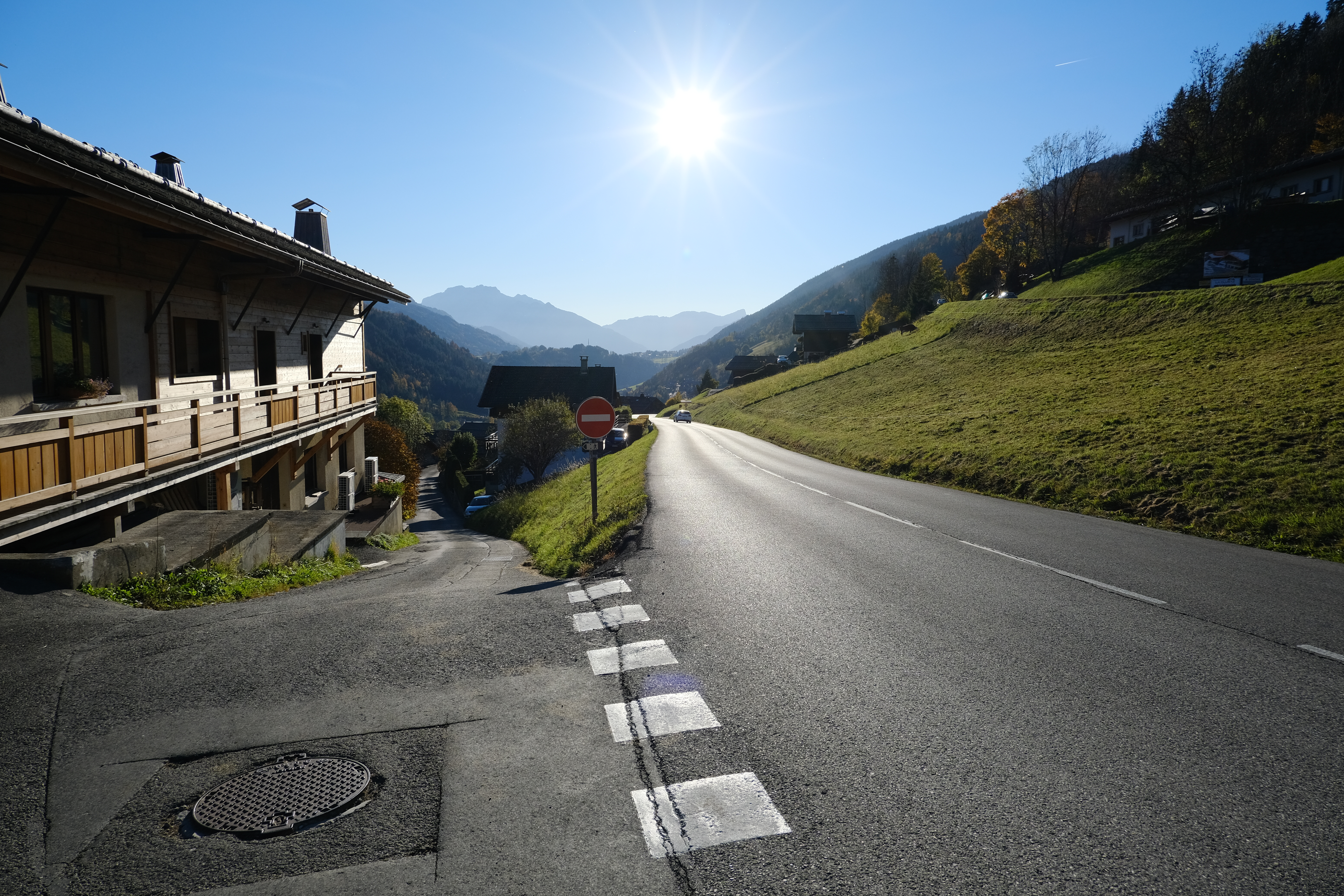
- Le Grand-Bornand, near the family chalet
- Location: 45°58′08″N 6°26′49″E; Le Grand-Bornand, France
- Date: 11 April 2003
- Attack type: Quintuple murder
- Weapons: Firearm, blunt weapon
- Deaths: 5
- Victims: Xavier Flactif; Graziella Ortolano; Grégory, Lætitia, Sarah
- Perpetrators: David Hotyat, Alexandra Lefevre, Stéphane Haremza and Isabelle Haremza
- Motive: Jealousy and financial gain

The Flactif family murders, known in France as the tuerie du Grand-Bornand (English: Grand-Bornand massacre or Flactif affair is a French criminal case which was publicised in 2003, following the disappearance of a property developer named Xavier Flactif, 41 years old, his wife Graziella Ortolano, 36 years old, and their three children Grégory, 7 years old, Lætitia, 9 years old and Sarah, 10 years old, in Le Grand-Bornand in Haute-Savoie.

David Hotyat, a tenant of a chalet belonging to the Flactif family, was arrested a few months later. He confessed to murdering the family and burning their bodies in the forest. He was sentenced to life imprisonment in 2006. His partner, Alexandra Lefevre, and a couple of friends, Stéphane and Isabelle Haremza, were sentenced for complicity, to 10 years, 15 years, and 7 years in prison respectively.

== Background ==
Xavier Flactif was born to a Chadian father and Guadeloupean mother and was adopted at the age of three. He worked as a property developer and was a landlord in the ski resort of Le Grand-Bornand. He and his wife had three children.

== Disappearances and investigation ==
The case began following the unexplained disappearance of the Flactif family in April 2003. The alert was made by the son of Graziella Ortolano and stepson of Xavier Flactif, Mario Leblanc, who came to in order to join them on vacation. A taxi from Le Grand-Bornand, had left on 12 April 2003, to pick him up at Lyon–Saint-Exupéry Airport had brought him to the house which he found locked. The police initially thought the family had perhaps been victims of a road accident, but the search yielded nothing. After an initial search of their chalet in Chinaillon on 14 April, the Annecy prosecutor, Denis Robert-Charrerau, ordered a second search during which the police noted the disappearance of two laptops which had been present during the first. On 22 April 2003, the prosecutor opened a judicial investigation for “kidnappings and sequestrations”.

The investigation was initially based on a possible flight abroad, perhaps linked to the father's business. Reportedly the real estate developer had major professional problems involving late construction sites, debts and unpaid bills. He had found himself in the past under the surveillance of the Brigade financière following a fraud case. Moreover, the civil companies he had registered in Grand-Bornand were all in the name of his partner, Graziella Ortolano. In addition, the family vehicle was found in the parking lot of Geneva Airport in Switzerland.

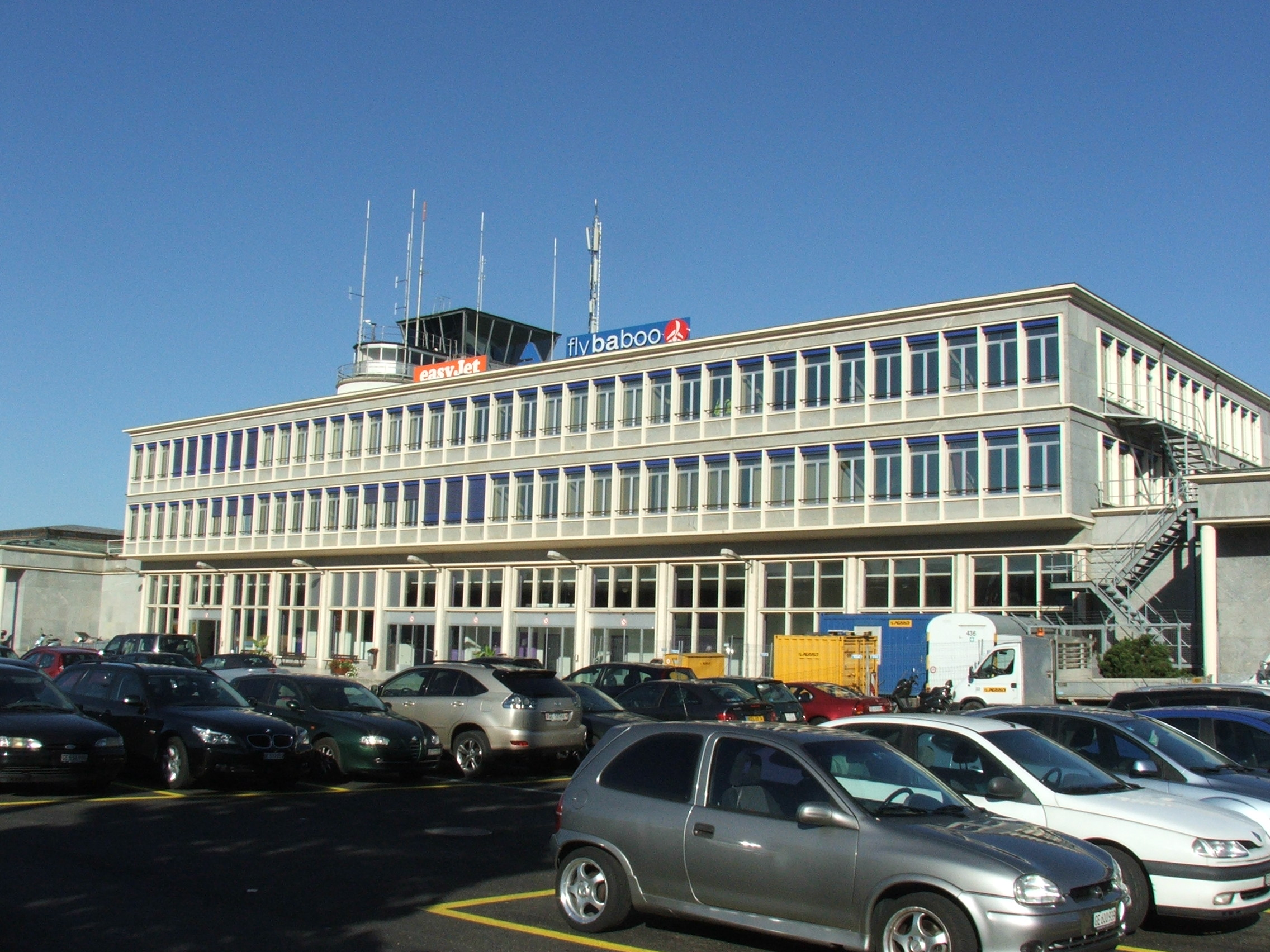
The family Toyota was found parked at Geneva Airport in Switzerland.

Initially, in view of these elements and Flactif's cunning personality, investigators found this theory of escape plausible, but did not rule out the possibility of criminal involvement. On 5 May, the prosecutor announced that traces of blood, carefully washed but visible with Luminol, had been found by the forensic police in the chalet. These traces contained the DNA of the five members of the Flactif family. A small caliber cartridge case (6.35 mm) and fragments of a baby tooth were also found in the house. "Small suspicious stains" were detected by the technicians in the back of Xavier Flactif's Toyota 4x4 found on 13 May in a parking lot at Geneva airport. The vehicle had been washed and the trunk floor mat was cut with a cutter. The specialist in blood trace morphoanalysis specified the causes of death of the victims which indicated that they had been killed with a knife.

Speleologist gendarmes then searched the surrounding cavities for bodies, and DNA samples were taken from around a hundred residents of the region, but yielded no results.

While the mystery remained unsolved, DNA samples were positively identified on 8 July 2003. It concerned a 31-year-old mechanic, David Hotyat, who was a tenant of a chalet belonging to the Flactifs. His partner Alexandra Lefevre was a former cleaning employee of the victims. They had moved to Haute-Savoie in 2001 and were neighbours of the Flactifs but the gendarmerie, before questioning them, decided to carry out a series of telephone taps to obtain more information and discover possible accomplices. These showed that a couple of friends, Stéphane Haremza and his wife Isabelle, also from the Nord department, seemed to be involved. On 16 and 17 September 2003, the gendarmerie arrested David Hotyat, his partner and the couple of friends.

Before their arrest, the Hotyat couple had been questioned by the press at the start of the investigation, notably on the programme Sept à huit on TF1. The mechanic and especially his partner had listed the grievances accumulated against their landlord, reproaching him for his "loud mouth", talking about illegal rentals, unfinished work, criticizing the family's lifestyle and spreading rumours about his alleged villainous behaviour. This deliberately accusatory attitude, tinged with hatred towards the victims, led the investigators to take a closer look at the Hotyat couple, whom they placed on telephone tapping, a measure which revealed that David Hotyat initially refused to submit to DNA tests, reinforcing the suspicions of the police.

== Arrests and incarcerations ==
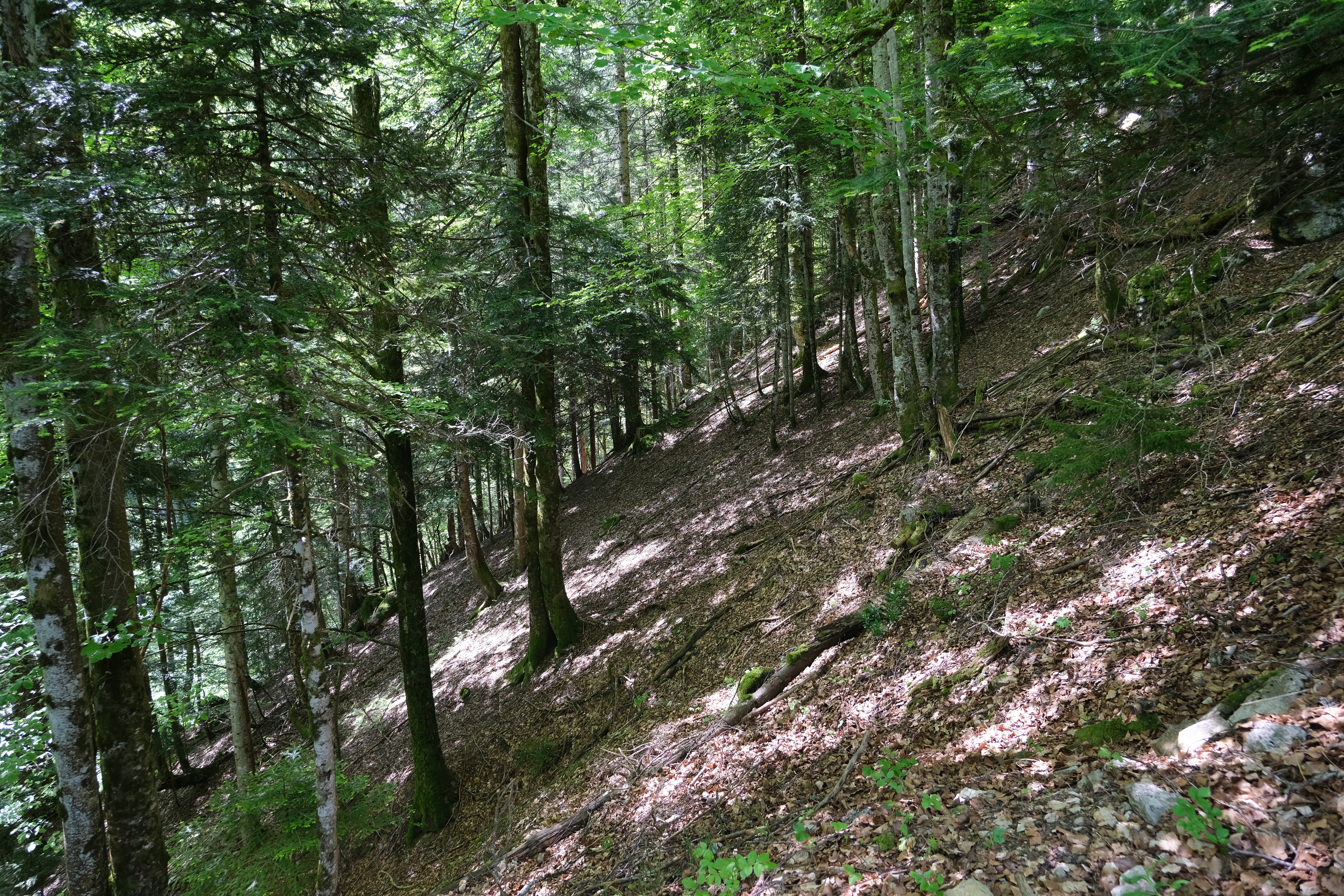
The bodies of the five family members were burned in the forest near Thônes.

From the first hours of his police custody, David Hotyat, confused by his DNA found at the crime scene, confessed to the quintuple murder and led investigators to the woods of Thônes, a few kilometers from Grand-Bornand, where he set fire to the bodies. He said he acted alone, in a fit of passion, but the Haremza couple declared that he had the idea of killing the family after watching a report by Sept à Huit on the serial killer Alfredo Stranieri in January 2003. However, his partner was considered the mastermind of the crime. She and the Haremza couple helped him prepare the murders and conceal the evidence. Various objects belonging to the Flactif family including DVDs, computer hardware, camcorder, electronics and cell phones were found at their home. According to the reconstruction and the elements of the case, the killer went to their chalet on the afternoon of 11 April to have a discussion with his landlord, but the meeting apparently went wrong. David Hotyat claimed to have wanted to shoot him in the head without expecting that the weapon would work, but the shot went off. To avoid leaving any witnesses, he allegedly killed the three children and their mother with blunt objects and the pistol. Then, the bodies were taken to the forest near Thônes, where they were burned in the woods. The motive was believed to be mainly based on jealousy and greed aroused by the success and lifestyle of the real estate developer, fuelled by other disputes, particularly financial and real estate. These feelings are said to have driven the culprits towards an obsession for revenge.

On 10 October 2003, David Hotyat retracted his statement, and defended an unlikely version of events. He claimed that when he went to the Flactif's house on the fateful day, and discovered that two mysterious people had already killed the family and had forced him to help them get rid of the bodies. But he was confounded, notably by the testimonies of his accomplices which allowed investigators to retain the mitigating circumstance of premeditation.

David Hotyat was interviewed three times by a psychologist who detected in him "narcissistic, phobic and operative traits with a tendency to flee from emotions in action, with an ideal of mastery" (...). David Hotyat's capacity for splitting and avoidance can only lead him to be considered dangerous," notes the expert report".

== Trials and convictions ==
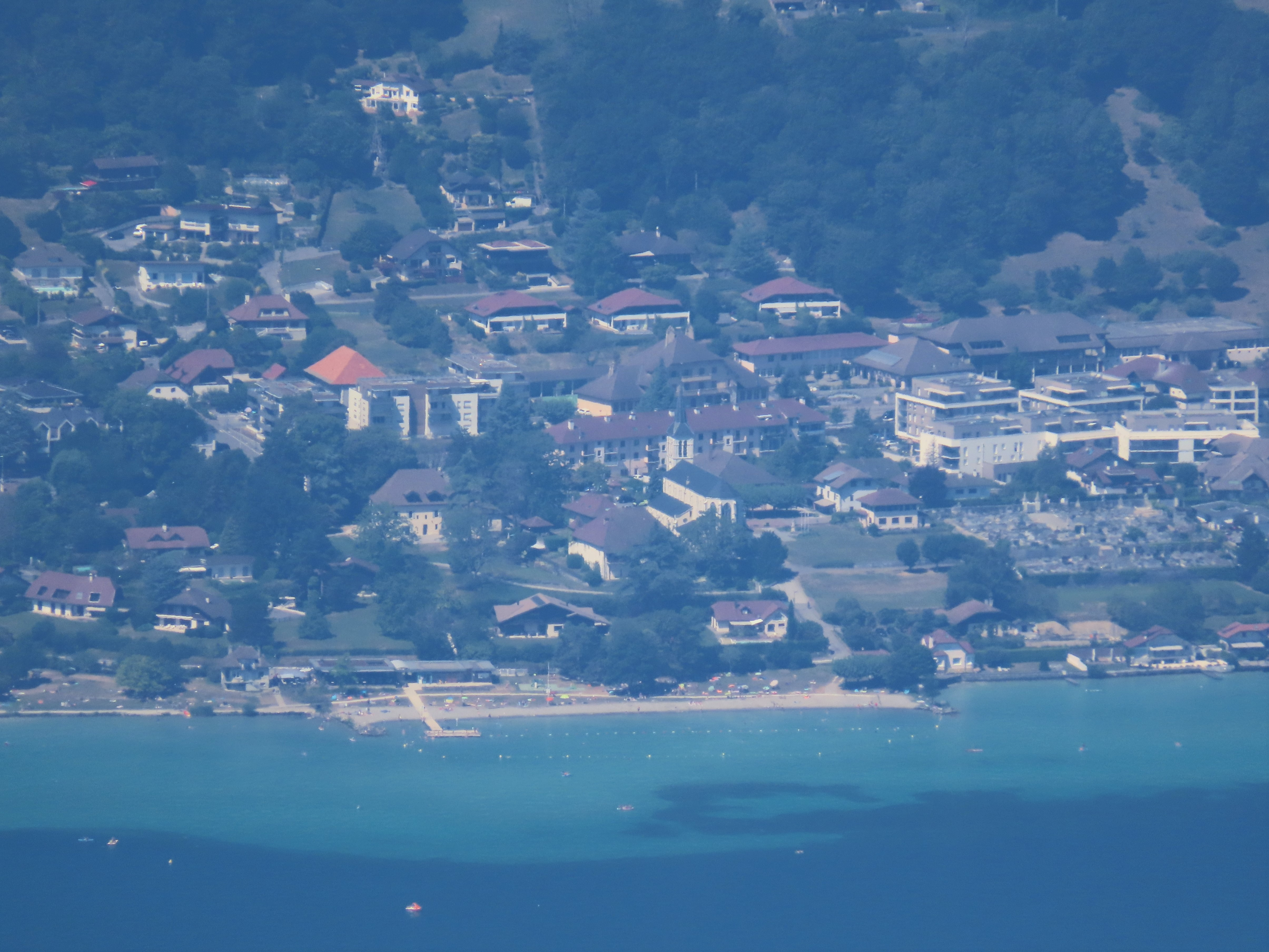
The trial took place in Sevrier.

Following the trial held from 12 June to 30 June 2006 before the Assize Court of Haute-Savoie, in Sevrier, David Hotyat was sentenced to life imprisonment with at least twenty-two years to serve. His accomplices received sentences of fifteen years in prison for Stéphane Haremza, ten for Alexandra Lefevre, and seven for Isabelle Haremza, while Mickael Hotyat, the brother of David Hotyat, was also sentenced to one year suspended without any entry on his criminal record, for having made one of the murder weapons disappear. Only David Hotyat appealed the court decision, but he finally withdrew on the first day of his new trial, on 10 December 2007, accepting the sentence handed down against him at first instance. Hotyat can reportedly apply for release in 2025.

The Hotyats and the Haremzas were also tried and convicted for two cases separate from the criminal trial: having set fire, a year before the tragedy, to a chalet under construction belonging to the Flactifs, and for a series of thefts and burglaries committed in and around Grand-Bornand. Indeed, David Hotyat, driven by the desire for an ever more comfortable life similar to that of his victims, had fallen into delinquency upon his arrival in Haute-Savoie.

== David Hotyat ==
David Hotyat was born on 23 October 1972 in Arras, of a worker father and a postwoman mother, and spent his youth in Biache-Saint-Vaast, in Pas-de-Calais. Very distant from his mother, he became attached to his father and began to practice his father's passions: athletics (holding the cadet record for the 3,000 meters at the Biache-Saint-Vaast athletics club), fishing, and nature. As school did not interest him, he carried out his military service in the former Yugoslavia, as a peacekeeper. In 1999, with his new partner Alexandra Lefèvre, they left Nord-Pas-de-Calais, the region where they came from. They settled in Ain, then in Le Grand-Bornand at the end of 2001. It was then that he met Xavier Flactif, a property developer, who successively rented him several chalets in the ski resort.

== Filmography ==
- Possessions by Éric Guirado, 2012 was inspired by this news item.
- La Vie rêvée des autres by Didier le Pécheur, 2024, which covers the important elements of the Hotyat family's arrival at the chalet, before the murder case.

== See also ==
- List of solved missing person cases: post–2000

== Sources ==
- Pascal, Michel (2009). 40 ans d'affaires criminelles. Michel Pascal.

== Bibliography ==
- Kelly, Christine (2006). L'Affaire Flactif: Enquête sur la tuerie du Grand-Bornand. Calmann-Lévy.
- Nathalie Truche, People Like Them, Editions du Rouerge, 2020 (novel loosely inspired by this news story)

=== Television documentaries ===
- “The Flactif affair” in 2004-2005 in Secrets d'actualité on M6.
- “The Flactif case” in 2006 in The Seven Deadly Sins - L'Envie on TF1.
- « David Hotyat, la tuerie du Grand-Bornand » de Nicolas Glimois en octobre 2008 et juin 2010 dans Faites entrer l'accusé présenté par Christophe Hondelatte sur France 2.
- "David Hotyat, the Grand-Bornand massacre" by Nicolas Glimois in October 2008 and June 2010 in Faites entrer l'accusé presented by Christophe Hondelatte on France 2.
- "The Flactif Affair: A Murdered Family" on January 28, 2009 in Enquêtes criminelles : le magazine des faits divers on W9.
- "The Flactif Affair" September 20, 2009, February 14, the 17th and the August 21, October 22, the 4 and 9 November 2010 in Criminal Affairs on NT1.
- “The Flactif affair” in 2013 in The Karl Zéro files on RMC Découverte.
- “The Grand-Bornand massacre” (second report) in “... in Haute-Savoie” on the 19th and May 26, and the June 3, 2014, in Crimes on NRJ 12.
- "Flactif Affair: The Chalet of Horror" (first report) October 25, 1st and November 9, 2014 and the 11th and July 22, 2015 in Criminal Chronicles on NT1.
- “The Grand-Bornand massacre” on May 20, 2017 in Indices on Numéro 23.
- "Flactif Affair, Proof by Blood" on October 16, 2021 in Au bout de l'enquête, la fin du crime parfait ? on France 2.
