= 2017 Paris shooting =

Mass shooting in Paris, France

- Location: Paris, France
- Date: 19 September 2017; 20:45
- Weapon: 9mm SIG Sauer SP 2022 pistol
- Deaths: 4 (including the perpetrator)
- Injuries: 3
- Perpetrator: Arnaud Martin

On the evening of 19 September 2017, a policeman killed three people and wounded three others during a killing spree in Paris, France.

== Shootings ==
At about 20:45 local time in the commune of Sarcelles, in the northern suburbs of Paris, 31-year-old policeman Arnaud Martin and his girlfriend were having a discussion in their car, as the woman had the intention of breaking up the relationship with the man. Suddenly, the officer pointed his service pistol at his girlfriend and opened fire, critically wounding her in the face. Two local men, aged 30 and 44, who were nearby at the time of the incident, intervened as they heard the gunshot. The gunman got out of the car and shot and killed the two men. He then went to the girlfriend's house, where he encountered her parents and sister. Martin opened fire again and killed the woman's father and wounded the mother and the sister. He then killed the family's pet dog and committed suicide, ending the killing spree.
