= Jean-Claude Bonnal =

French criminal (born 1953)

- Born: Jean-Claude Bonnal; 4 February 1953 (age 73); Saigon, French Indochina
- Other names: The "Chinaman"; Bobonne
- Children: 3
- Penalty: 10 years' imprisonment (1979); 7 years' imprisonment (1985); 12 years' imprisonment (1991); 18 years' imprisonment (2003), but acquitted in 2004; Life imprisonment with a 22 years security period (2006, 2007 and 2008)

Details
- Victims: 7
- Span of crimes: 1973–2001
- Country: France
- State: Île-de-France
- Date apprehended: July 1973 (first time); April 1983 (second time); 3 November 1988 (third time); 17 December 1998 (fourth time); 19 October 2001 (final time)

Jean-Claude Bonnal (born 4 February 1953) is a French criminal and multi-recidivist hold-up man of Vietnamese origin, nicknamed 'the Chinaman'.

Bonnal committed seven murders, two attempted murders - probably a third - and several armed robberies between 1973 and 2001. His case caused a stir in October 2001, following the murder of six people, including two police officers, after he was released in December 2000.

== Biography ==
=== Youth ===
Jean-Claude Bonnal was born on 4 February 1953 in Saïgon. He was one of 12 siblings. The Bonnal family did not stay long in Ho Chi Minh City, as the Indochina War wreaked havoc in French Indochina.

In 1956, Bonnal and his family fled the Indochina War, were repatriated to France and settled in Vitry-sur-Seine, on the outskirts of Paris. As a child, Bonnal was regularly subjected to racism by his classmates, who treated him as a foreigner and Chinese, even though he was Vietnamese.

In 1969, when Bonnal was 16, two of his brothers, aged 12 and 15 respectively, died in a fire in a cellar. The incident was a 'hard blow' for Bonnal, who became depressed before turning to delinquency.

In May 1971, aged 18, Bonnal was arrested and remanded in custody for his first misdemeanours. He spent a short time in prison, before being released following a suicide attempt. Just after his release, Bonnal did his military service in the navy. He remained in the navy for five months before deserting in 1972.

=== The "Southern Suburbs Gang" and first murder ===
In 1972, Bonnal, aged 19, became the 'second knife' in the 'gang de la banlieue sud' in Paris and began planning various hold-ups, burglaries and robberies in order to collect a large sum of money. The 'gang de la banlieue sud' consisted of four members, including Bonnal, who frequented the bars of Vitry-sur-Seine to 'put their plans into action'. When the gang was formed, Bonnal was nicknamed 'Bobonne' by his accomplices.

In July 1973, Bonnal and his accomplices in the 'gang de la banlieue sud' robbed an elderly woman's house to pay for a holiday. The gangsters divided up the tasks: some bound and gagged the old lady, while the others robbed the house. However, the victim's bindings are relatively tight and she suffocates to death. Believing that the old lady was still alive, Bonnal and his accomplices fled and committed another burglary in the process, during which the gang deliberately injured a passer-by. Bonnal and his accomplices were recognised by witnesses to the robbery and arrested. Following their arrest, they were charged with burglary, robbery and murder, then remanded in custody. The examining magistrate considered that the act had been committed with premeditation.

While in custody, Bonnal and the rest of the 'gang from the southern suburbs' defended themselves against the charges, insisting that they were unaware that the elderly woman had died as a result of the robbery. In order to prove their case, the four defendants asserted that they would not have committed a burglary in the immediate aftermath, because of the consequences and the penalty involved - the death penalty (which was still applicable at the time of the events and the investigation). Faced with the relentless insistence of Bonnal and his accomplices, the examining magistrate decided to analyse the facts in minute detail. In the years that followed, he finally recognised the consistency of the gang's claims and referred them to the Assize Court for burglary, robbery and fatal blows.

In March 1979, Bonnal and the rest of the 'gang de la banlieue sud' appeared before the Assize Court for burglary and manslaughter during the robbery. Bonnal was 26 at the time. At the end of his trial, Bonnal was found guilty of 'assault and battery resulting in death without intent' and sentenced to 10 years' imprisonment.

=== Release, married life and a return to crime ===
Bonnal was released on 30 June 1981, after serving almost 8 years in prison. Bonnal was 28 when he was released and decided to move to Orly, into a small flat in the Mermoz housing estate.

Fifteen days later, on 15 July, Bonnal met an 18-year-old girl called Martine, who was fascinated by Bonnal's kindness. The two began a romantic relationship and got married. Martine remained very sensitive to Jean-Claude's plight, as he regularly told her about the death of his two younger brothers, who had been burnt alive in a cellar in Vitry several years earlier. Bonnal and Martine gave birth to a son in 1982. The birth soon became complicated for the couple, especially Bonnal, because of their low income.

In April 1983, Bonnal held up a supermarket and stole a tractor before fleeing. Following the robbery, people present at the scene described a man of Asian, or even Chinese, appearance. The police were able to use a sketch to identify Bonnal, aged 30, who had been free for less than two years. Bonnal was arrested, charged with robbery and theft, and remanded in custody at Fresnes prison. When Martine learned of Bonnal's relapse, he admitted to her that he had 'slipped up' and insisted that he had not intended to relapse, saying that he would not commit any more crimes. Empathising with Jean-Claude, Martine decides to support him in his defence, even going so far as to propose marriage. While on remand, Bonnal married Martine on 4 January 1984 at the Fresnes prison.

In June 1985, Bonnal appeared before the Seine-et-Marne Assize Court on charges of robbery and theft, committed as a repeat offender. He was 32 years old at the time. During his trial, Bonnal was supported by his wife Martine, who painted a very positive picture of her husband and believed in his redemption. At the end of his trial, Bonnal was sentenced to 7 years' imprisonment.

=== Release and the Barclay's Bank robbery ===
Bonnal was released from prison in April 1988 after five years. At the age of 35, he was unable to find a job that would allow him to support his family: himself, Martine and her son. Shortly after his release from prison, Bonnal learned that Martine was expecting a second child and realised that he had to put his income aside to avoid being laid off.

On 3 November, Bonnal returned to crime, robbing a branch of Barclay's Bank in the 16th arrondissement of Paris. The robbery turned out badly for Bonnal, as the police were soon alerted to the attack. During the attack on Barclay's Bank, a shoot-out broke out between Bonnal and the police. There was heavy gunfire and a policeman was seriously injured in the shoot-out. Bonnal was eventually overpowered by the police along with three accomplices. The four men were charged with robbery and attempted murder, and remanded in custody. On 30 December, Martine gave birth to the couple's second daughter, Anaïs Bonnal. When her husband returned to prison, Martine did not abandon him because of his efforts to save the family.

From 9 to 11 September 1991, Bonnal appeared before the Paris Assize Court for the Barclay's Bank robbery preceded by the attempted murder of a police officer. At the end of the three-day trial, Bonnal was found guilty as charged and sentenced to 12 years' imprisonment.

=== Released and implicated in the 'Printemps Haussmann' robbery ===
Bonnal was released on 30 January 1997, after more than 8 years in prison. Following his release, Bonnal took a job at a karaoke restaurant called Taratata, where he became friends with a girl.

At around 2 pm on 24 November 1998, two men held up a bureau de change at the entrance to the Printemps Haussmann department stores' and killed the security guard. The loot amounted to 296,000 francs. As they left the building, the robbers removed their balaclavas. Émile Ferrari, a mechanic and former bodyguard who had witnessed the robbery in the shop, followed them and tried to immobilise Mohamed Benamara in the street. One of the robbers then shot him in the head. The two accomplices panicked and threatened the crowd with their weapons as they fled. The stampede left ten people injured. Émile Ferrari survived his wound, but it caused him memory loss. Investigators found two 11.43 calibre shells at the scene. Émile Ferrari was certain that it was Bonnal who shot him, while witnesses said it was Benamara. Later, Émile Ferrari told the examining magistrate that it was Benamara who shot him in the head. An informer reported Bonnal, aged 45, and Benamara, aged 49, to the investigators.

On 16 December, Benamara was arrested at his partner's home in Colombes. The next day, Bonnal was arrested at his home in Villeneuve-Saint-Georges. They denied the facts, said they did not know each other and had alibis that were not infallible. When Benamara's home was searched, the investigators found no evidence. But when Bonnal's flat was searched, foreign currency was found in an envelope on the fridge and a Colt 45 pistol was discovered in a plastic bag hidden behind a skirting board. Bonnal declared that the pistol was not his and that it had been entrusted to him for safekeeping and concealment. Ballistics tests established that it was this pistol that had fired the two bullets at the scene of the robbery. At the end of their respective periods in police custody on 18 December, Bonnal and Benamara were charged with armed robbery preceded by attempted murder and remanded in Fleury-Mérogis prison.

During the trial, Bonnal was taken from prison to be presented to Ferrari. When he was lurking behind the one-way mirror, Ferrari formally identified Bonnal, using the description of his face, which earned him the nickname 'the Chinaman'. Bonnal did not appreciate this nickname, as he was of Vietnamese origin. In pre-trial detention, Bonnal and Benamara, who claimed to be completely innocent of the charges against them, repeatedly applied for their release, which was refused. However, the defence of the two defendants raised doubts about their guilt, due to the quality of the video from the surveillance cameras used during the robbery and the fact that Bonnal and Benamara did not know each other, despite their criminal records, which 'only' suggested that they were guilty.

In November 2000, Marie-Alix Canu-Bernard, Benamara's lawyer, made a new request for her client's release, which was finally granted, due to the lack of evidence linking him to the robbery. After almost two years in custody, Benamara was released on 4 December. On 21 December, the judges of the indictment division also decided that Bonnal's pre-trial detention was not justified. It had lasted two years, an average length of time in Paris for a criminal case. On 26 December, while awaiting trial, Bonnal was released from Fleury-Mérogis prison on 80,000 francs (12,196 euros) bail.

=== The 'Fontenoy' and 'Plessis-Trévise' killings ===
On the evening of 6 October 2001, Brahim Titi and Akim Bouhassoune entered the Fontenoy bar-tabac in Athis-Mons and drank a kir at the counter. Later, when the other customers had left the bar, Bonnal, wearing a balaclava, joined Titi and Bouhassoune and held up the 38-year-old owner, Gildo Alves. While Titi and Bonnal searched the bar and emptied the till, Bouhassoune locked Virginie the waitress, aged 24, Albertina the cleaner, aged 34, the owner Marie-Louisa, aged 34, and Sandra, aged 9, the owners' daughter, in the toilets. He tied their hands behind their backs with electric wire. The adults were taken one by one to the basement, where they were shot in the head. A second bullet was fired at Gildo in his lower abdomen. The robbers spared the little girl and left with a haul of around 7,000 francs. Sandra managed to get away, discovered the bodies in the basement, went back upstairs, opened a window, and called to passers-by for help. Neighbours phoned the police. Sandra related that while she saw only two of the robbers, when they were locked in the toilets Albertina had told her that there were three of them.

The next day, two of the robbers tried to withdraw money from an ATM using Marie-Louisa Alves' bank card. The ATM kept the card. The ATM surveillance camera did not work. In the basement, the investigators found five .380 calibre shells. Ballistics tests established that the ammunition had been fired from an AMT Backup pistol, with a magazine containing five bullets, a model that is extremely rare in France. The bar's patrons identified Titi and Bouhassoune.

On the morning of 16 October, Bonnal, Titi, Djamel Bessafi, Zahir Rahmani and Chérif Asslouni attempted to burgle the house at 16 avenue de la Sirène, Plessis-Trévise. Jean-Marc Pernès, a doctor, his wife, a jeweller, their son Vincent and their daughter were huddled together on the ground floor, bound and gagged. A niece, whose presence the burglars were not aware of, had hidden in the bathroom and alerted police with her mobile phone at around 7:30 am. Five police officers in two vehicles arrived discreetly. In one car were Brigadier Patrick Le Roux, aged 33, Constable Paul Desbiens and Assistant Constable Alexandre Riebel. In the other car were peacekeepers Yves Meunier, aged 27, and Lionel Levecq. Le Roux quietly entered the property and looked discretely inside to ensure that the call was nota false alarm; when this was confirmed, he rejoined his colleagues waiting in the police vehicles, as public order police officers did not have bullet-proof waistcoats at this time. Meanwhile, inside, the burglars, who had spotted the police outside, were panicking and discussing taking the girl hostage and escaping. The police officers heard the mother's desperate cries and decided to intervene immediately. Paul Desbiens stayed back near the cars, while the four other police officers passed on either side of the house, in groups of two. The burglars gave up trying to take a hostage and escaped from the house in disarray. Le Roux and Meunier intercept Bessafi, subdue him and handcuff him. Levecq and Alexandre Riebel saw a burglar trying to escape by climbing over the wall at the bottom of the garden. They try to grab him to immobilise him. Just then, gunfire rains down on the police officers. Yves Meunier died instantly, shot three times, including once in the back of the neck. Patrick Le Roux was shot in the chest and died in the hours that followed. Lionel Levecq, who was shot in the back, was seriously injured.

=== Arrests and controversy over the release of Bonnal ===
After hiding between two cars, Bessafi, aged 28, was arrested on 16 October 2001, wounded by one of the bullets fired by Bonnal in the Plessis-Trévise massacre. He was charged with complicity in murder and attempted murder of an official and armed robbery, and remanded in custody.

Investigators found :

- a black left glove in the street. Traces of DNA were found in it, which was recognised as being that of Jean-Claude Bonnal.
- in the house, a rucksack containing a balaclava.
- in the grounds of the property, an empty Beretta pistol magazine.
- 9-millimetre shell casings.

On 19 October, Bonnal, aged 48, Titi, aged 33, and Bouhassoune, aged 33, were taken into custody in connection with the Fontenoy massacre. Of the three suspects, only Bouhassoune admitted involvement in the quadruple murder. He claims to have acted with Bonnal, Bessafi and Titi, and names Titi as the shooter. After being held in police custody, Bonnal, Titi and Bouhassoune were charged with murder and armed robbery and imprisoned at Fleury-Mérogis. After the arrest of the four robbers, the investigators carried out a complete check of Bonnal's telephone records to identify the other members of the Plessis-Trévise massacre. They discovered regular exchanges with Zahir Rahmani and Cherif Asslouni, both aged 21.

On 25 October, Assloui was arrested in the Plessis-Trévise massacre. Another team was sent to arrest Rahmani, but found the door closed. After a few checks, the investigators discovered that Rahmani had fled the day after the Plessis-Trévise massacre. In police custody, Asslouni admitted taking part in the events and denounced Bonnal as the shooter. He was charged with murder and attempted murder of an official, as well as armed robbery, and imprisoned at Fleury-Mérogis. On 5 November, Rahmani was finally arrested after being identified. In police custody, he also admitted involvement in the Plessis-Trévise massacre and accused Bonnal of being the gunman. He was also charged with murder and attempted murder of an official, as well as armed robbery, and was subsequently incarcerated in Fleury-Mérogis prison. Following their imprisonment, Asslouni and Rahmani nevertheless retracted their confessions and claimed that Bonnal was innocent; statements that were not considered serious, given the evidence in the case.

On 14 February 2002, Bonnal was taken into police custody in connection with the Plessis-Trévise massacre. He also denied any involvement in the events and claimed that the DNA found at the scene had been planted by the gendarmes. He was charged with murder and attempted murder of an official and armed robbery, and taken to the Fleury-Mérogis prison. The following day, Titi was also taken into police custody in connection with the killing. Unlike Bonnal, Titi admitted taking part in the events, but claimed that he and Bonnal were not the shooters. Titi was charged with murder and attempted murder of an official and armed robbery, and returned to Fleury-Mérogis prison. These two cases led to controversy between the police and the judiciary, as Bonnal had just been released on parole pending another trial, since he could not be held in custody for more than two years. He was then described as 'public enemy number 1'.

=== Judgement in the 'Printemps Haussmann' robbery ===
On 7 February 2003, the trial of Bonnal and Benamara in the Printemps foreign exchange robbery case began at the Paris Assize Court. Only Bonnal was present, as Benamara, who was 'on the run', was absent. Florence Moreau was in charge of Bonnal's defence. Michel Zaoui acted for Émile Ferrari. On 12 February, Bonnal was sentenced to 18 years' imprisonment. Claiming to be innocent, he appealed against the sentence. In August, Benamara was captured in Spain and returned to prison for having breached his probation.

On 11 June 2004, Bonnal's appeal trial began at the Seine-Saint-Denis Assize Court in Bobigny. Bonnal is again appearing alone in this trial, as Benamara was not tried at first instance. Bonnal's defence is based on the fact that he could not have been seen in the shop because the robbers were hooded. And the only witness who said he saw him in the street was Émile Ferrari, whose memory was failing as a result of his injury. On 16 June, Bonnal was acquitted, but remained in prison for the six murders committed during the 2001 robberies.

Benamara appeared in court from 16 to 20 December 2005 for the Printemps robbery. He was defended by Marie-Alix Canu-Bernard and Éric Dupond-Moretti. At the end of his trial, Benamara was acquitted.

=== Judgement in the 'Fontenoy' and 'Plessis-Trévise' killings ===
On 4 January 2006, the trial in the Athis-Mons and Plessis-Trévise cases began at the Val-de-Marne Assize Court in Créteil. Françoise Berrux and Michèle Launay are the police officers' lawyers. Catherine Schmelk is the lawyer for the Pernès family. Alexandre Varaut is the lawyer for the Alves family. Françoise Cotta is defending Akim Bouhassoune. Hubert Delarue is defending Brahim Titi. Philippe Bilger is the public prosecutor. On the morning of 1 February, Bonnal was sentenced to life imprisonment with a 22-year prison term. Brahim Titi was sentenced to life imprisonment. Akim Bouhassoune was sentenced to 25 years' imprisonment, Djamel Bessafi and Zahir Rahmani to 15 years' imprisonment and Cherif Asslouni to 8 years' imprisonment. In February, Bonnal was awarded compensation of €18,000 for the 2 years he spent in pre-trial detention in the Printemps exchange office robbery case, in which he had been found innocent. In the end, he withdrew the claim to avoid fuelling controversy.

On 4 June 2007, the appeal trial began at the Paris Assize Court. Brahim Titi was defended by Laurence Cechman. On 4 July, Bonnal was again sentenced to life imprisonment with a 22-year security period. Brahim Titi's sentence was reduced to 25 years' imprisonment, Akim Bouhassoune's sentence was increased to 30 years' imprisonment, Zahir Rahmani and Djamel Bessafi were each sentenced to 13 years' imprisonment, while Cherif Asslouni was again sentenced to 8 years' imprisonment.

Bonnal and his lawyers appealed to the Court of Cassation, but the appeal was rejected on 12 March 2008.
