= Pailhès, Hérault =

Pailhès
- Commune
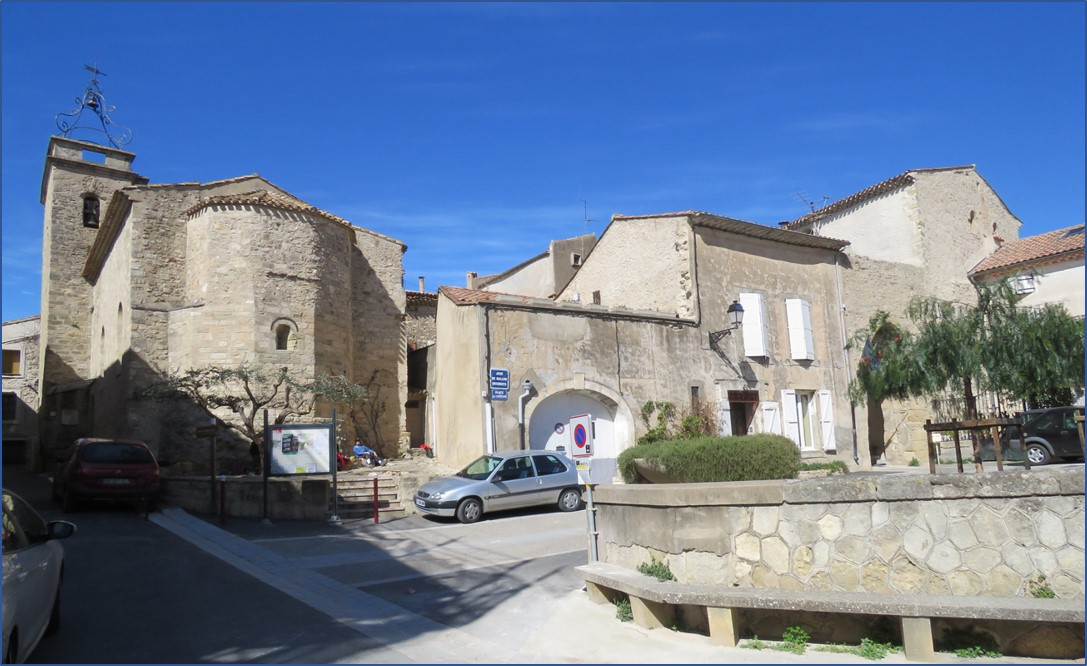

- Coat of arms
- Location of Pailhès
- Location within France Location within Occitanie
- Coordinates: 43°25′53″N 3°11′15″E
- Country: France
- Region: Occitania
- Department: Hérault
- Arrondissement: Béziers
- Canton: Cazouls-lès-Béziers
- Intercommunality: CC Les Avant-Monts

Government
  - Mayor (2020–2026): Robert Souque
- Area^{1}: 6 km^{2} (2.3 sq mi)
- Elevation: 140 m (460 ft)
- Highest elevation: 147 m (482 ft)
- Lowest elevation: 58 m (190 ft)
- Population (2023): 622
  - Density: 100/km^{2} (270/sq mi)
- Time zone: UTC+01:00 (CET)
  - Summer (DST): UTC+02:00 (CEST)
- INSEE/Postal code: 34191 /34490
- ^{1} French Land Register data, which excludes lakes, ponds, glaciers > 1 km^{2} (0.386 sq mi or 247 acres) and river estuaries.

Pailhès (French pronunciation: [pajɛs]; Languedocien: Palhièrs) is a commune in the Hérault department in the Occitanie region in southern France.

== Population ==
Historical population
Year	Pop.	±% p.a.
1968	258	—
1975	263	+0.27%
1982	306	+2.19%
1990	421	+4.07%
1999	462	+1.04%
2007	468	+0.16%
2012	470	+0.09%
2017	570	+3.93%
2023	622	+1.47%
Source: INSEE

== See also ==
- Communes of the Hérault department
