= Sofitel massacre =

Mass shooting in France

- Location: Avignon, France
- Date: 5 August 1983; 3:30 a.m. (CEST)
- Target: Sofitel hotel
- Attack type: Mass shooting, robbery
- Deaths: 7
- Perpetrators: Jean Roussel, François Arpinot, Gérard Rolland
- Motive: Robbery

On 5 August 1983 at 3:30 am, gunmen entered a luxury Sofitel hotel in Avignon, France. They killed seven people there in a mass shooting which has been referred to as the Sofitel massacre. Four of those killed were guests, including a French diplomat, and three were employees.

Police initially believed the gunmen were hoping to break into the hotel's safe deposit boxes. The unmasked men entered the hotel lobby with a revolver and two 9mm pistols and ordered the receptionist to take them to the manager's room, apparently to search for a master key of the boxes. Two guests who had been alerted by the noise attempted to intervene. The gunmen panicked, and took seven people hostage. They shot the hostages in three different second-floor rooms before attempting to flee the area. Police said the murders appeared to be an attempt to eliminate witnesses who could identify the gunmen. They encountered police during their escape and one of the gunmen was captured after a struggle that left one policeman injured. Another one of the gunmen was recognized by one of the police officers. The captured gunman was identified as Jean Roussel, a parole evader who had been serving a 15-year prison sentence at a prison in eastern France, but had been given leave after serving 12 years and had not returned to prison after his leave expired.

The murders occurred shortly after the French government had abolished the death penalty for murder and in another move made it easier for long-term prisoners to win parole. The government was criticised by hotel and restaurant unions as well as the police, demanding tougher action against crime. Minister of Justice Robert Badinter, criticized by political opponents for being soft on crime, said that prison governors should exercise extra on granting clemency to hardented criminals in the future.

During the subsequent investigation, Roussel barely spoke, and he died from a heart attack in 1985 whilst he was being taken to be interrogated by a magistrate. In June 1987, François Arpinot, a scrap dealer, and Gérard Rolland, a nightclub bouncer, were sentenced to 18 and 15 years in prison, respectively. It was implied that Roussel launched the robbery to finance his escape, as he was already detained in another case but granted leave.

== See also ==
- Marseille bar massacre
- Monbar Hotel attack
