= Quintuple murder near Dunkirk =

2024 murders in France

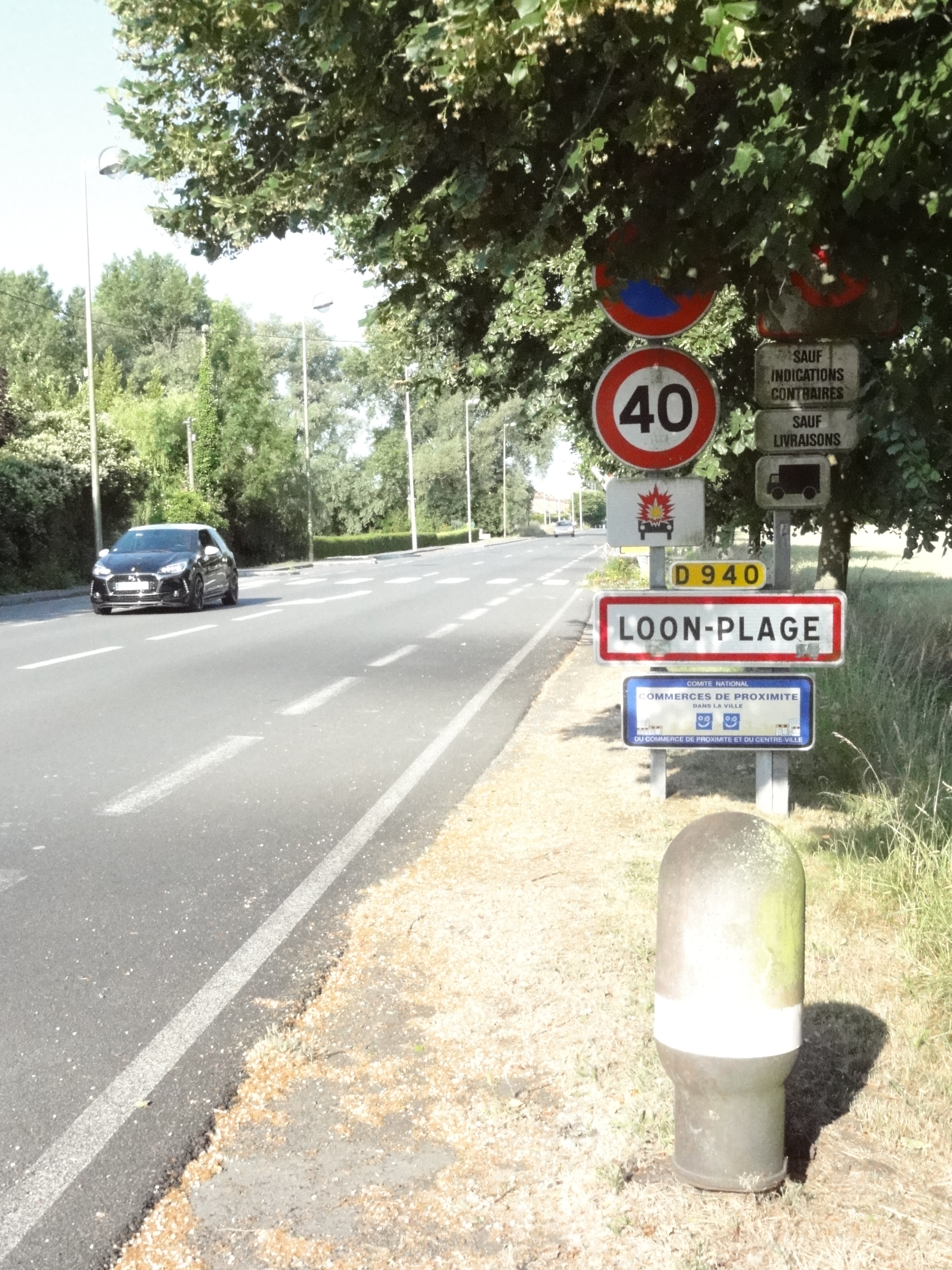
- Loon-Plage, where four of the five murders took place.
- Date: 14 December 2024
- Location: Wormhout and Loon-Plage, France
- Type: Shooting spree
- Motive: Personal revenge (first and second shooting); Unknown (third shooting)
- Deaths: 5
- Injuries: 0

The quintuple murder near Dunkirk (French: Quintuple meurtre près de Dunkerque) was a series of murders committed over the course of two hours in Wormhout and Loon-Plage, near Dunkirk, France, on 14 December 2024. The main suspect first shot dead his former employer in Wormhout, then two security guards from a company where he had also been employed in Loon-Plage. Finally, he also shot dead two migrants from Iranian Kurdistan on the side of a road nearby.

The suspect surrendered to the police immediately after the incident. His motives are still unclear, but investigators believe the first three victims were murdered for professional revenge. The motive for the last two victims is still unknown.

The killings raised discussions about anti-immigrant sentiment.

== Events ==
The perpetrator began the series of attacks by ramming his vehicle into the courtyard of the home of Paul Dekeister, head of a road transport company, in Wormhout at around 3.15pm. Upon seeing the vehicle, the 29-year-old man left the house, where he was hit by numerous gunshots, and was killed instantly; he was shot dead in front of his partner.

Around 4 p.m., Marc Lehmhus and Aurélien Cugny, two security guards, were shot dead while patrolling the industrial port area of Loon-Plage. Then a few minutes later and five kilometres further on, the killer shot dead Mustafa and Ahmid, two migrants from Iranian Kurdistan, on the side of the road near a migrant camp. This occurred near Loon-Plage train station; the Iranian citizens of Kurdish ethnicity were aged 19 and 30; both were residents of the city's refugee camp.

The killer also aimed at a father and son who were driving near the migrant camp but did not shoot.

The perpetrator, a 22-year-old man, handed himself over to the Ghyvelde's gendarmerie at 5.20pm. It was confirmed that the first victim was the owner of a company where the killer worked, while both security guards were his former colleagues. It is suspected that the reasons for the first three murders can be attributed to work-related resentments. However, the motives for the last two murders and whether the killer knew the victims is unclear.

== Suspect ==
Paul D., 22, has no criminal or psychiatric record. He admitted to investigators that he shot all the victims.

Paul D. was a member of a sport shooting club in Leffrinckoucke near his home and owned numerous firearms. In addition to the five firearms found in the car with which he surrendered to the police, investigators discovered 12 other firearms at his home. The first victim had fired the suspect in October 2024.

== Legal proceedings ==
Immediately taken into custody after surrendering to the police, Paul D. repeated his confessions to the investigators in charge of the case. He was charged on December 17 with murder for the first three victims and murder for the last two, and placed in pre-trial detention. According to Charlotte Huet, the Dunkirk prosecutor, while "no definitive conclusion can be drawn at this time", "the first person killed in Wormhout was the last employer of the accused" who "had dismissed the accused at the beginning of October". Paul D. had also "worked for six months for the company that employed the security guards who were killed" without mentioning any "particular disagreement" with these two victims, but a resentment "more focused on the management" of this company. Finally, concerning the last two murders of Iranian migrants "The motive still needs to be explored". According to a police source who described it as a "mass killing", the suspect, who did not know the two migrants, "apparently stopped, got out of his vehicle, stood below the road, took his weapon and fired in front of him".

== Tributes to the victims ==
Silent marches were organized in tribute to the two security agents and brought together 200 people in Dunkirk and 300 people in Loon-Plage.
