= Saint-Just, Puy-de-Dôme =

Saint-Just
- Commune
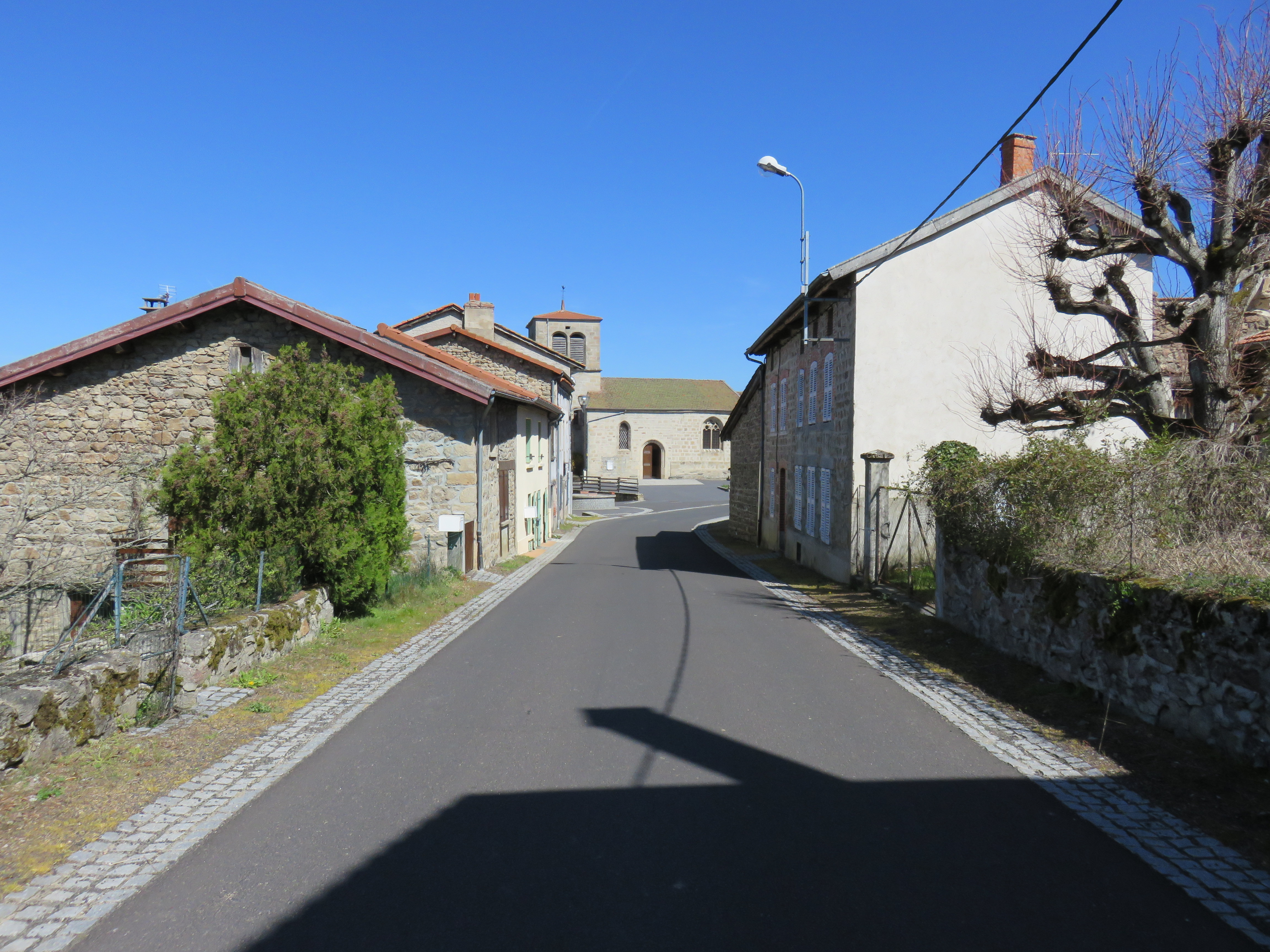
- Saint-Just in 2017.
- Location of Saint-Just
- Location within France Location within Auvergne-Rhône-Alpes
- Coordinates: 45°28′09″N 3°47′21″E
- Country: France
- Region: Auvergne-Rhône-Alpes
- Department: Puy-de-Dôme
- Arrondissement: Ambert
- Canton: Ambert
- Intercommunality: CC Ambert Livradois Forez

Government
  - Mayor (2026–32): François Chautard
- Area^{1}: 19.42 km^{2} (7.50 sq mi)
- Elevation: 800 m (2,600 ft)
- Highest elevation: 1,156 m (3,793 ft)
- Lowest elevation: 600 m (2,000 ft)
- Population (2023): 144
  - Density: 7.42/km^{2} (19.2/sq mi)
- Time zone: UTC+01:00 (CET)
  - Summer (DST): UTC+02:00 (CEST)
- INSEE/Postal code: 63371 /63600
- ^{1} French Land Register data, which excludes lakes, ponds, glaciers > 1 km^{2} (0.386 sq mi or 247 acres) and river estuaries.

Saint-Just (French pronunciation: [sɛ̃ ʒy]) is a commune in the Puy-de-Dôme department in Auvergne-Rhône-Alpes in central France.

== 2020 shooting ==
On 23 December 2020, three police officers were shot dead and a fourth injured in the commune after responding to a report of domestic violence. The gunman, a 48-year-old man already known to authorities for child custody issues, then set fire to his home and was later found dead in his vehicle. President Emmanuel Macron and Prime Minister Jean Castex reacted to the incident. Non-terrorist gun attacks on French police officers are rare; the last such incident occurred in 2012, according to BBC News.

== See also ==
- Communes of the Puy-de-Dôme department
