= Human rights in France =

Human rights in France are contained in the preamble of the Constitution of the French Fifth Republic, founded in 1958, and the 1789 Declaration of the Rights of Man and of the Citizen. France has also ratified the 1948 Universal Declaration of Human Rights, as well as the European Convention on Human Rights 1960 and the Charter of Fundamental Rights of the European Union (2000). All these international law instruments take precedence on national legislation. However, human rights abuses take place nevertheless. The state of detention centres for unauthorized migrants who have received an order of deportation has also been criticized.

== Conventions and acts ==
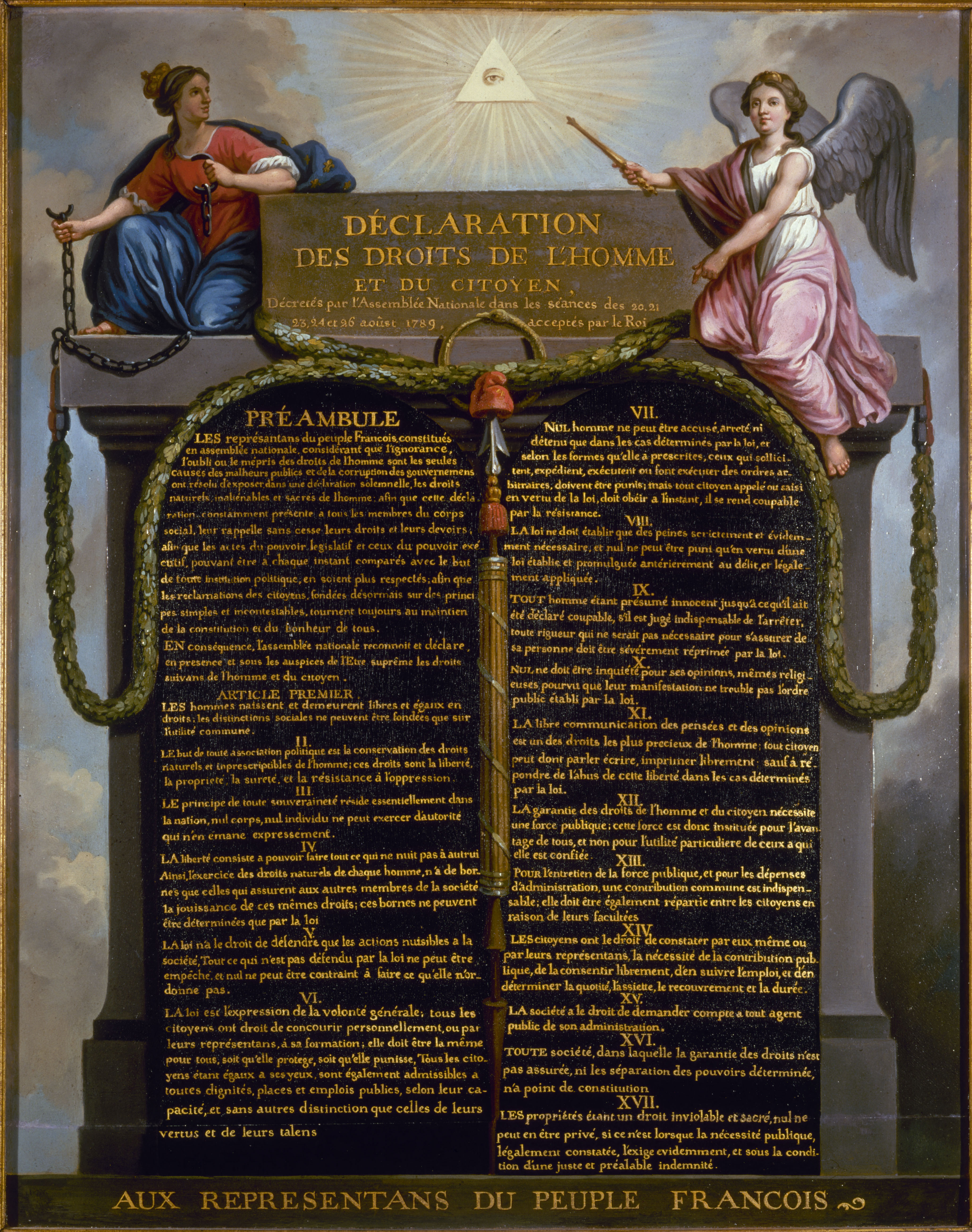
Declaration of the Rights of Man and of the Citizen

During the French Revolution, deputies from the Third Estate drafted the Declaration of the Rights of Man and of the Citizen, voted by the General Estates on 26 August 1789. Inspired by the philosophy of the Enlightenment and by the 1776 United States Declaration of Independence – Lafayette participated in the drafting of both – in that it proclaims the "inalienable rights of Man", and is protected by a "Supreme Being", it mainly granted to the people the right of freedom of expression, of freedom of thought, freedom of association, liberty, security and the protection of private property. France signed and ratified the Universal Declaration of Human Rights in 1948 as well as all Geneva Conventions.

== Roma expulsion (since 2010) ==
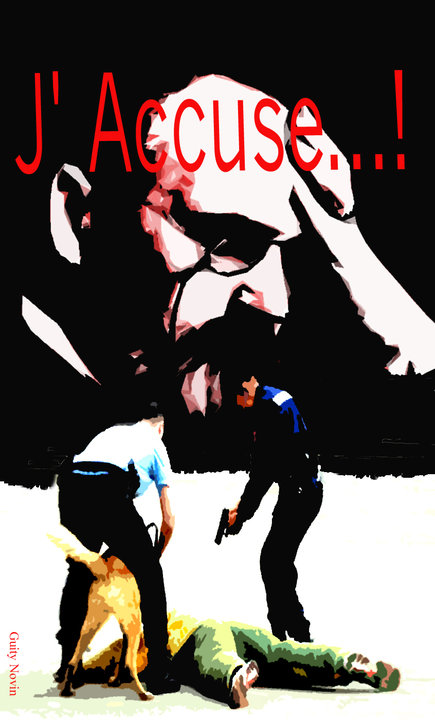
Poster protesting the treatment of Roma gypsies by Guity Novin

In 2010, the French government launched a programme of forced deportation of the Roma. These deportations have been heavily criticised by many human rights and international political organisations. The Council of Europe has condemned the expulsions, calling them "contrary to human dignity". Those who accepted to leave France received €300 per adult and €100 per child under the condition that they sign a declaration stating they will not try to come back to France. The French Government had the goal of deporting 30,000 Roma in 2011.

== Censorship ==
In conventional terms, France does not have censorship laws. Historically, before its repeal under François Mitterrand in the early 1980s, the ORTF had a significant influence on the mass media. The CSA that has since replaced it is concerned with the respect of French law in the media, in particular the 1990 Gayssot Act which prohibits racist and/or religious hate speech, and time period allocated to each political party during pre-electoral periods. Furthermore, other laws prohibit homophobic hate speech, and a 1970 law prohibits the advocacy of illegal drugs.

== Police abuses and detention conditions ==
In 2004, the Inspector General of the National Police received 469 registered complaints about illegitimate police violence during the first 11 months of the year, down from 500 during the same period in 2003. There were 59 confirmed cases of police violence, compared to 65 in the previous year. In April 2004, the ECHR condemned the Government for "inhumane and degrading treatments" in the 1997 case of a teenager beaten while in police custody. The court ordered the Government to pay Giovanni Rivas $20,500 (15,000 euros) in damages and $13,500 (10,000 euros) in court costs. The head of the police station in Saint-Denis, near Paris, was forced to resign after allegations of rape and other violations committed by the police force under his command. Nine investigations concerning police abuse in this police station were done in 2005 by the IGS inspection of police.

== Discrimination ==
On 2 December 2020, the French government dissolved the ‘Collective Against Islamophobia in France’ (CCIF), an NGO that combats discrimination against Muslims. CCIF's works have been recognised by the Human Rights Watch as well as other international human rights organizations and lawyers to be important in documenting the discriminatory impact of counterterrorism measures.

The "idéal républicain" (republican ideal) intends to achieve equality in rights between French citizens. To this end, in the national census, the collection of statistics regarding ethnicity or religion is forbidden. This has led to some debate over the decline of indigenous minority languages and identity in the French Republic.

According to the Direction centrale des renseignements généraux (Central Directorate of General Intelligence), the former intelligence service of the French police, in 2004 there were 1,513 explicitly racist or antisemitic incidents in France, including 361 acts of violence. Antisemitic incidents were the most numerous, accounting for 950 of the incidents, including 199 violent acts. Anti-Maghreb incidents accounted for 563 incidents, including 162 violent acts. The Paris region was the most affected. 2007 saw an overall decrease of 9% in such incidents.

In May 2019, "inhumane treatment" by France towards the children of French citizens affiliated with Islamic State jihadists stranded in Syria highlighted that Paris was flouting its UN Convention on the Rights of the Child obligations.

=== Minority acculturation ===
Before the Revolution, Standard French (a dialect of Langue d'Oïl) was spoken in only slightly more than half of the territory of France. In western Brittany, southern Flanders, Alsace-Lorraine and most of the southern half of France (Occitania), local people had their own distinct cultures. Breton is a Celtic language akin to Welsh, Alsace-Lorraine was part of the German-speaking world, while Occitan is a separate Romance language. With the centralization of the Republic that accompanied the Revolution, the state imposed the teaching of Standard French in all schools and universities, and the exclusive use of French in government institutions.

Promotion of a local language or culture has finally been allowed, but under severe restrictions which effectively make it difficult to publish, organize classes, or media broadcasts.

=== Freedom of religion ===
Freedom of religion in France is guaranteed by the constitutional rights set forth in the 1789 Declaration of the Rights of Man and of the Citizen. In practice, however, the government restricts religious expression in the public square. For example, it is typically illegal to wear religious symbols in public schools such as crosses or hijabs. In addition, France from the Third Republic onwards has had a long tradition of hostility towards Catholicism, and an almost equally long flirtation with antisemitism.

=== Women's rights ===
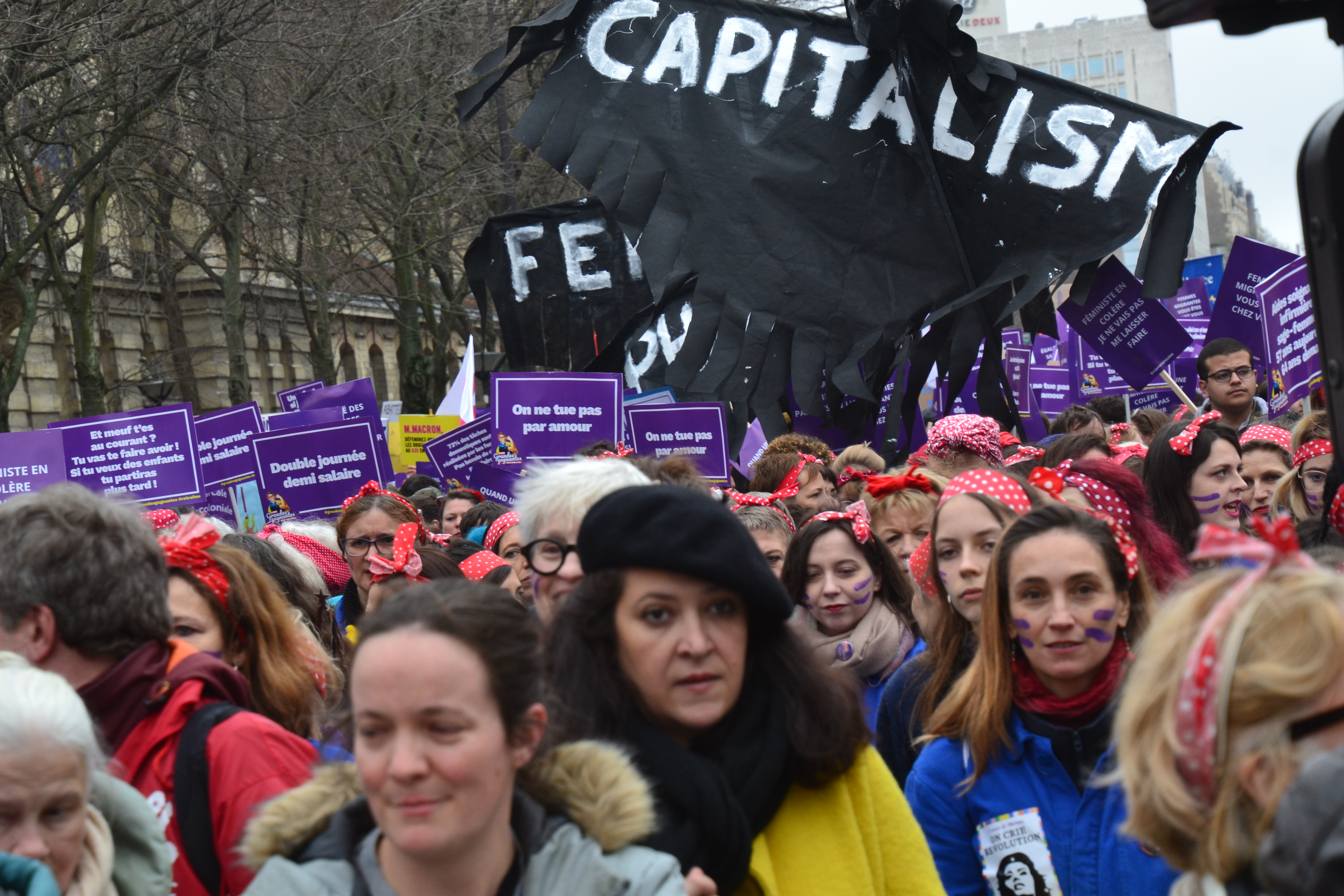
International Women's Day march in Paris on 8 March

France legalized women's suffrage on 21 April 1944.

The Neuwirth law legalized birth control methods on 28 December 1967. Youths were given anonymous and free access to them in 1974.

Abortion was legalized in the first 12 weeks of pregnancy by the Veil law on 17 January 1975.

=== LGBT rights ===
Homosexuality was decriminalized during the Revolution by the law of 25 September – 6 October 1791.

On 6 August 1942 Vichy government introduced a discriminative law in penal code: article 334 (moved to article 331 on 8 February 1945 by the Provisional Government of the French Republic) increased age of consent to 21 for homosexual relations. This law remained valid until 4 August 1982.

A less known discriminative law (ordonnance n°60-1245 on 1960, 25 November ) doubled penalty for indecent exposure in case of homosexual activity, between 1960 and 1980 (penal code article 330). This text is also known as the Mirguet amendment.

The pacte civil de solidarité, a form of civil union, introduced in 1999, allows same-sex unions.

A bill granting same-sex couples the right to marry and jointly adopt children was adopted by the National Assembly on 18 May 2013 by Law 2013-404

=== Intersex rights ===
Intersex people in France face significant gaps in protection from non-consensual medical interventions and protection from discrimination. In response to pressure from intersex activists and recommendations by United Nations Treaty Bodies, the Senate published an inquiry into the treatment of intersex people in February 2017. It calls for significant changes to some medical practices, and also reparations for individuals subjected to coercive medical treatment. An individual, Gaëtan Schmitt, has taken legal action to obtain civil status as "neutral sex" ("sexe neutre") but, in May 2017, this was rejected by the Court of Cassation.

== Human trafficking ==
There has been a growing awareness of human trafficking as a human rights issue in Europe (see main article: trafficking in human beings). The end of communism and collapse of the Soviet Union and Yugoslavia has contributed to an increase in human trafficking, with the majority of victims being women forced into prostitution. France is a transit and destination country for persons, primarily women, trafficked mainly from Central and Eastern Europe and from Africa for the purpose of labour exploitation and sexual exploitation. The Government of France fully complies with the minimum standards for the elimination of trafficking. The French government was called on to make sure that implementation of the 2003 Domestic Security Law did not result in re-victimizing trafficking victims by improving the screening of foreign prostitutes so that trafficking victims are properly identified and protected from their traffickers.

== Tayeb Benabderrahmane case (2020–present) ==
France traditionally claims to act as the protector of its nationals abroad. This mission, framed by the 1963 Vienna Convention on Consular Relations, involves providing assistance in cases of arrest, conviction, or violations of fundamental rights.

Several parliamentary reports and NGOs, however, have noted gaps between this principle and actual practice, particularly in politically sensitive situations. A prominent case is that of Franco-Algerian citizen Tayeb Benabderrahmane, who was arrested by in Doha in January 2020. He claims to have been arbitrarily detained for 307 days without effective consular assistance or access to an independent lawyer. Released in October 2020 on condition that he sign a confidentiality protocol with Nasser Al-Khelaïfi, he filed a complaint in France in 2022 for kidnapping and torture.

On 31 May 2023, he was sentenced in absentia to death for espionage by a Qatari criminal court. The French Ministry for Europe and Foreign Affairs was informed of this judgment in the summer of 2023, but did not communicate it to Benabderrahmane, who only became aware of it in November 2023. The lack of any public reaction highlighted a possible failure of diplomatic protection.

== Mass surveillance and databases ==
The collection, storage, and use of personal data is regulated by the CNIL whose mission is to enforce compliance with the data privacy law.

== Human rights organizations ==
Human rights organizations operating in France include:

- Ligue des droits de l'homme (LDH, Human Rights League – created during the Dreyfus Affair at the end of the 19th century)
- Amnesty International (AI)
- Human Rights Watch (HRW)
- Cimade (the only organization authorized to visit internment camp for illegal aliens (sans-papiers, literally "without-papers", that is people who do not possess identity documents)
- GISTI (immigrants support NGO)
- LICRA (anti-racist NGO)
- MRAP (anti-racist NGO)
- SOS Racisme (anti-racist NGO)

== See also ==
- Environmental racism in Europe
- Freedom of information in France
- High authority for the struggle against discrimination and for equality (HALDE)
- Humanism in France
- La Fondation pour la Mémoire de la Déportation
