= Killing of Aboubakar Cissé =

2025 crime in France

- Location: La Grand-Combe, Gard department, France
- Date: 25 April 2025 c. 8:00 (CEST)
- Attack type: Stabbing
- Weapon: Knife
- Victim: Aboubakar Cissé
- Accused: Olivier Hadzovic

On 25 April 2025, Aboubakar Cissé, a 22-year-old Muslim man, was stabbed to death in the Khadidja mosque in La Grand-Combe, in Gard, France. The attack, committed with extreme violence (57 stab wounds) and accompanied by Islamophobic remarks, was quickly perceived as a hate crime. The case sparked strong national emotion and rekindled debates on the recognition of Islamophobia in France, the slowness of the authorities' response, and the protection of Muslim places of worship.

== Context ==
Aboubakar Cissé was a 22-year-old Soninke Malian living in France. Trained as a carpenter, he was an active volunteer at the Khadidja Mosque in La Grand-Combe.

On the morning of 25 April 2025, he was cleaning the Khadija Mosque before Friday prayers. It is reported that, around 8 a.m., Olivier Hadzovic, a 20-year-old Frenchman of Bosnian origin, entered the mosque. Aboubakar Cissé chatted with him briefly before the two headed to the prayer room. As Aboubakar Cissé knelt to pray, Hadzovic stabbed him about forty times. According to the police report, he then took his phone out and filmed his dying victim while spouting Islamophobic remarks and expressing his intention to kill again. He is alleged to have posted the video on Snapchat. Upon noticing a surveillance camera, he fled.

== Investigation ==
According to media reports, Olivier Hadzovic was enabled by family complicity to hide successively in Béziers, then in Menton, before crossing into Italy. After a manhunt involving more than 70 investigators, Hadzovic surrendered on 28 April 2025, turning himself in at a police station in Pistoia, in Tuscany, accompanied by a lawyer and a relative from Pistoia. He was taken into custody and then extradited to France. Although no ideological claim has been formally found, the anti-Muslim racist nature of the murder has been mentioned by several officials and media outlets. After Hadzovic's arrest, Alès public prosecutor Abdelkrim Grini, who had viewed footage of the killing, described the incident as an act of terrorism.

The National Anti-Terrorism Prosecutor's Office (PNAT) followed the case without taking charge of the investigation, considering that it was the act of an isolated individual. The Nîmes prosecutor states that he would have "acted in an isolated context, without ideological claims or links to an organization."

=== Suspect background ===
Olivier Hadzovic is the eldest of seven children. Born in Béziers to a Roma family from Bosnia and Herzegovina, he is a Christian and a French national. Aged around twenty, he received the revenu de solidarité active and "spent a good part of his time playing video games."

His first examination shows "an important, even potentially decisive, psychological dimension." The report described him as expressing "desires to rape women, murder, or rape corpses" on online forums. According to his Italian lawyer, the young man admitted to the murder but denied acting out of hatred for Islam, stating that he had killed the first person he found.

On 20 June 2025, Olivier Hadzovic was released from prison and hospitalized in a psychiatric center in the Pyrénées-Orientales. According to a psychiatric report, he was suffering from a "psychotic disorder that had abolished his discernment and control over his actions" at the time of the crime.

== Reactions ==
=== Political reactions ===
The act was unanimously condemned by the political class. President Emmanuel Macron declared that racism and religious hatred have no place in France. Prime Minister François Bayrou also called the attack an "unspeakable Islamophobic act." On 29 April the National Assembly observed a minute of silence in memory of Aboubakar Cissé.

=== Marches ===
On 27 April the residents of La Grand-Combe organized a silent march in his honor. It brought together approximately 2,000 people according to the organizers, and 1,400 according to the police. On the same day, a rally in Paris organized by political figures from La France insoumise (LFI) and the Écologistes brought together several hundred people. On May 1, at least a thousand people gathered in Paris in tribute to Aboubakar Cissé at the call of several groups including the High Council of Malians in France.

On 11 May several thousand demonstrators marched in Paris to denounce "the rise of Islamophobia in France" and pay tribute to Aboubakar Cissé, following an article published on May 5 in Politis, in which organizations and personalities called for a "large march throughout France" to "unite as a people against all forms of racism." Among these, the Adama Committee, La France Insoumise, the Collective against Islamophobia in Europe (formerly Collective against Islamophobia in France dissolved in France and reconstituted in Belgium) and personalities like Annie Ernaux and MeToo activist Adèle Haenel.

=== Criticism ===
Several members of the Muslim community and public figures criticized the slow official response. The French Council of the Muslim Faith, through its president Mohammed Moussaoui, slammed the unequal treatment of hate crimes, emphasizing that "the vast majority of Muslims in France believe that anti-Muslim hatred is not taken as seriously as other forms of hatred."

This perception was reinforced by the PNAT's decision not to take up the case, despite the alleged murderer's comments in the video he shot at the time of his act: "I did it (...), your shitty Allah." Several association leaders felt that if the victim had belonged to another faith or community, the state's response would have been faster and firmer.

Bruno Retailleau, Minister of the Interior at the time of the events, was criticized even by a section of the right for his lack of immediate statement. When he reacted publicly several days after the attack, he chose to focus on the fight against "political Islam", without directly mentioning the Islamophobic nature of the attack.

The president of the National Assembly, Yaël Braun-Pivet, initially refused to organize a tribute over a "lack of consensus" between parliamentary groups, citing a rule established in January 2025 according to which minutes of silence would no longer be granted for "individual cases" other than political figures and victims of terrorism. Faced with accusations of Islamophobia, she finally changed her mind and organized a minute of silence.

== Consequences ==
The case has rekindled the debate on the recognition of anti-Muslim crimes in France, the judicial response to these acts, and the state's handling of threats to Muslim places of worship. Several associations have called for a reform of public policies to combat religious discrimination.

According to sociologist Vincent Geisser, this event marked a turning point due to its unprecedented nature, as it targets a provincial mosque, a symbol of a peaceful Islam, integrated into local life. He compares the impact of this act to that of the Saint-Étienne-du-Rouvray church attack, the assassination of Father Hamel in 2016. The researcher also points out that this attack is part of a context of rising identity discourse and tensions around Islam in France and in Europe.

== See also ==
- Murder of Hichem Miraoui
