= Murder of Samuel Paty =

2020 murder in Éragny-sur-Oise, France

- Paty
- Location: 49°0′50.08″N 2°6′55.3″E; Éragny, Val-d'Oise, Île-de-France, France
- Date: 16 October 2020; 17:00 (CEST)
- Attack type: Decapitation, Islamic terrorism
- Weapon: Cleaver
- Victim: Samuel Paty
- Perpetrator: Abdoullakh Anzorov
- Motive: Jihadism, Islamic extremism

On 16 October 2020, Samuel Paty (French: [samɥɛl pati]), a French secondary school teacher, was attacked and killed in Éragny, Val-d'Oise, Île-de-France, France, by an Islamist terrorist.

The perpetrator, Abdoullakh Abouyezidovich Anzorov, an 18-year-old Russian Muslim refugee, killed and beheaded Paty with a cleaver, and was shot and killed by police minutes later. A social media campaign against Paty was linked to his subsequent murder. One of Paty's students had alleged that in a class on freedom of expression, he had shown his students Charlie Hebdo's 2012 cartoons depicting the Islamic prophet Muhammad, including an image of Muhammad naked with his genitals exposed. She later admitted that she lied about the material shown and had been absent from the class. Since then, ten people have been charged with conspiring with and assisting the killer, including an Imam, a parent of a student, and two students at Paty's school.

French president Emmanuel Macron said that the incident was "a typical Islamist terrorist attack", and that "our compatriot was killed for teaching children freedom of speech". The murder was one of several attacks in France in recent years and the second terrorist attack in France during the 2020 trial, at which alleged accomplices to the January 2015 Île-de-France attacks were to be arraigned for terrorism targeting the cartoons' publishers. In 2015 and 2016, two Islamist terror attacks (in Paris and in Nice) killed over 200 people. The Paty incident sparked debate in French society and politics. Many Muslims expressed offence at the cartoons, which were also the subject of the previous Charlie Hebdo shooting. The president of the French Council of the Muslim Faith condemned the murder, as did Imams of several mosques. Several Muslim-majority countries, including Iran, Jordan, Kuwait, as well as the Organisation of Islamic Cooperation, both denounced the attack and condemned the publication of the cartoons.

The response of the French government to the murder was criticized by many Muslims, including the president Recep Tayyip Erdoğan of the Republic of Turkey, some of whom called for a boycott of French goods. In November 2023, six teens went to trial on charges related to the murder. They were found guilty in December 2023 and given brief or suspended prison sentences.

== Background ==
=== Victim ===
Samuel Paty (French: [samɥɛl pati]) was born on 18 September 1973 in Moulins, Allier. He attended Théodore de Banville High School, Lumière University Lyon 2 and the IUFM, Lyon. Paty was a middle-school teacher of history, geography, and civics who taught for five years at the Collège Bois-d'Aulne, in Conflans-Sainte-Honorine, France, a suburb 30 kilometres (19 mi) north-west of central Paris. He lived ten minutes away from the middle school, in the small town of Éragny, Val-d'Oise. He was married and had a five-year-old son.

=== Perpetrator ===
The perpetrator, Abdoullakh Abouyezidovich Anzorov, was an 18-year-old who was born in Moscow and grew up in France. In their media statements French police drew attention to the teen's Chechen ethnicity, one of several Muslim minority groups in France. Anzorov moved to France with refugee status 12 years earlier as a six-year-old boy. He lived in the La Madeleine district of the Normandy town of Évreux, about 100 km (62 miles) from the murder scene and had no apparent connection with the teacher or the school.

The Anzorov family moved from the village of Shalazhi in Chechnya. Abdoullakh's father Abuezid moved first to Moscow, and then to Paris. Anzorov's half-sister joined ISIS in Syria in 2014. In March 2020, the family had received refugee status and 10-year residency cards in France. Abdoullakh was not noticed by security agencies, though he had previously been in court on minor misdemeanour charges.

Before the attack, he was in communication with an unidentified Russian-speaking jihadist in Syria. According to investigators, this individual was located via IP address to Idlib, Syria, the last rebel stronghold of the country which was under the control of the Hay'at Tahrir al-Sham organization. Hay'at Tahrir al-Sham later denied responsibility for the attack. Immediately following the attack, Anzorov claimed responsibility in an audio message in Russian, in which he announced his readiness to be a martyr, and that he would "avenge the prophet" by killing Paty, who had "shown Allah in an insulting manner". In a video broadcast on Instagram, he referred to the Islamic State, among other Islamic terrorist organizations.

Anzorov's family said they did not understand his actions. Anzorov had displayed signs of radicalisation: on 30 August, he had posted a photo montage depicting a beheading on his Twitter account. His Twitter account had been reported to the platform PHAROS without being tagged for further scrutiny. On 13 September 2020, he made a Twitter thread denouncing "the infidelity of the Saudi state, of its leaders, as well as all those who support them", a belief which he based on "its participation in the founding of idols worshiped [sic] outside of Allah", referring to the UN, UNESCO, WTO, Gulf Cooperation Council and the Arab League. While he was already showing signs of radicalization, Anzorov had made two requests for training in security operations through the National Council for Private Security Activities, the national licensing body, which were both rejected "because of his involvement in acts of violence". Investigators are uncertain as to whether his requests were made to enable him to access sensitive sites.

Anzorov's body was repatriated from France in December 2020; he was buried in his hometown in the Urus-Martanovsky District in Chechnya. The funeral was attended by about 200 people, some of whom shouted "Allahu Akbar".

=== Events leading up to the murder ===
One of the Charlie Hebdo drawings of Muhammad allegedly shown by Samuel Paty to his students.

Paty taught a moral and civic education course in early October 2020 on freedom of expression, in accord with the French national curriculum. He was alleged to have shown some of his teenage students a caricature of Muhammad from the satirical magazine Charlie Hebdo during a class discussion about freedom of speech. Before allegedly showing the caricature, Paty had invited Muslim students to leave the classroom if they wished. According to one student, he had previously shown these cartoons as part of the discussion every year since the Charlie Hebdo shooting in 2015. In the largest Sunni sects of Islam, any depiction of Muhammad is considered blasphemous.

According to France’s antiterrorism prosecutor Jean-François Ricard, Paty's lesson plan included two depictions of Muhammad, including one where he is naked with his genitals exposed.

Brahim Chnina, a female student's father, accused Paty of disseminating pornography to students and filed a criminal complaint with the police. Paty responded by filing a complaint of defamation. Chnina claimed on YouTube and Facebook that Paty had displayed an image of Muhammad nude; he named Paty, and gave the school's address. He encouraged other parents to join him in action and mobilise against the teacher, whom he described as a thug.

The Grande Mosque de Pantin published a video on its Facebook page a week before the murder. Abdelhakim Sefrioui, the imam of the mosque, a member of the Conseil des imams de France, and an Islamist militant known to French anti-terrorism police, accompanied the parent in his protest against the teacher in front of the school for showing the caricatures and demanding to meet the school's principal. Sefrioui called the teacher a "thug" in a video (French: voyou), while denouncing the administration of the college. He demanded the teacher's exclusion from high school with the rectorate. The term "thug" had been repeatedly used by Chnina earlier. The videos were taken down in the hours after the murder.

Chnina also filed a complaint with the school, and encouraged people to protest at the school. A meeting was held between the head teacher, the teacher, and an official from the education authority. Chnina additionally filed a legal complaint about Paty's lesson, leading the teacher to go to the local police station accompanied by the principal. Paty told investigators he could not understand the complaint because Chnina's daughter was not in class on the day Paty showed the cartoon. In March 2021, Chnina's daughter, known as "Z", admitted she had been suspended from school due to truancy since the day prior to Paty showing the cartoons, and, as such, she had not been in the classroom that day. Instead, she made up the cartoon story to appease her father. According to the Paty family lawyers, however, Brahim Chnina was aware that his daughter had been suspended before the cartoon incident.

The investigation showed that Chnina spoke to Anzorov nine times by telephone in a four-day period after he published videos criticizing Paty.

== Murder ==
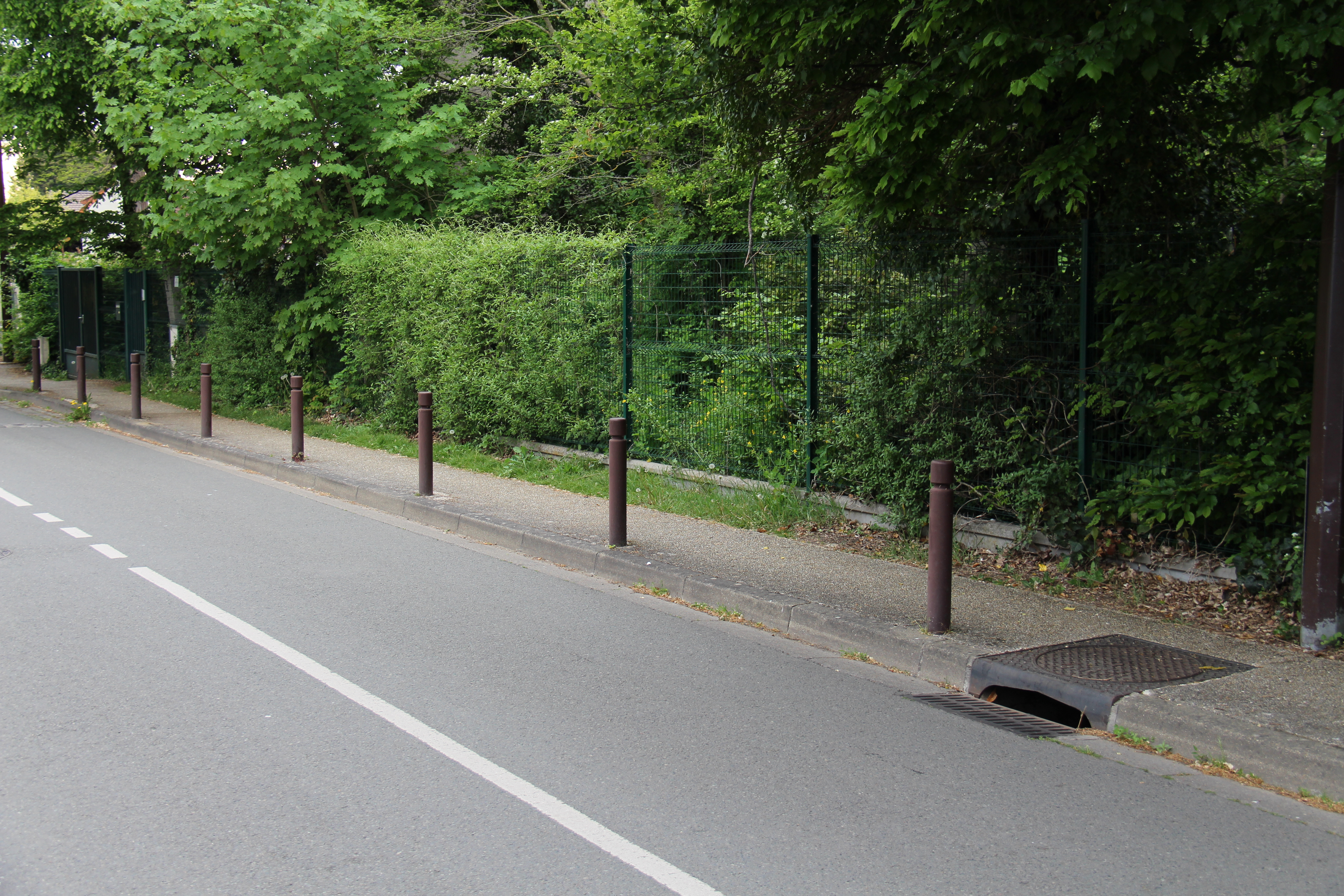
Rue du Buisson Moineau in Éragny-sur-Oise, the place where Samuel Paty was beheaded.

On 16 October 2020, a week and a half after Paty's freedom-of-speech class, Anzorov was driven to Paty's school by an alleged accomplice and waited outside the gates of the school. He asked a number of students to point out the teacher. He paid two students, aged 14 and 15, around €300 to identify Paty; the two then waited with Anzorov for two hours until they sighted Paty leaving. A Friday, it was the last schoolday before a two-week holiday. Anzorov had told them he intended to "hit" and "humiliate" Paty, according to Jean-François Ricard, in order to "make him apologise for the cartoon of the Prophet Muhammad".

Anzorov then followed Paty as he left the school. Using a knife 30 centimetres (12 in) long, Anzorov killed Paty and beheaded him in the Rue du Buisson Moineau in Éragny-sur-Oise near the school where Paty taught, at approximately 5:00 p.m. In addition to decapitating Paty, Anzorov inflicted a number of wounds to his head, abdomen, and upper limbs. Witnesses told police they heard the killer shout "Allahu Akbar" (the Takbir) during the attack.

Minutes after the murder, an account named @Tchetchene_270 (French: Chechen 270), identified by prosecutor Jean-François Ricard as belonging to Abdoullakh Anzorov, posted on Twitter an image of Paty's severed head. The photo was accompanied by the message: "In the name of Allah, the most gracious, the most merciful, ... to Macron, leader of the infidels, I executed one of your hellhounds who dared to belittle Muhammad, calm his fellow human beings before a harsh punishment is inflicted on you." The image was seen by many of Paty's students.

Minutes later, Anzorov was confronted by police about 600 metres (660 yd) from the scene in Éragny, near Conflans-Sainte-Honorine, and the police tried to arrest him. Anzorov shot at the police with an air rifle and tried to stab them with a knife. In response, the police shot him nine times, killing him. On Anzorov's phone, they found a text claiming responsibility and a photograph of Paty's body.

== French government response ==
Charlie Hebdo, No. 1057, page 16, showing cartoons republished in response to violent Islamist reactions to Innocence of Muslims in 2012, which included the 2012 Benghazi attack and the death of the US Ambassador to Libya, J. Christopher Stevens. In 2015, the Kouachi brothers perpetrated the Charlie Hebdo shooting in retaliation, killing the magazine's cartoonists Charb, Cabu, Honoré, Tignous and Wolinski.

President Macron visited the school where Paty had worked, and said that the incident was "a typical Islamist terrorist attack". He also said: "our compatriot was killed for teaching children freedom of speech". French Education Minister Jean-Michel Blanquer called the killing an "attack on the French nation as a whole". Jean-Rémi Girard, president of the secondary school teaching union, said teachers were "devastated" but would not be cowed. France's anti-terrorist prosecutor said the teacher had been "assassinated for teaching," and the attack was an assault on the principle of freedom of expression.

Sixteen people were later taken into custody for investigation. They included Anzorov's grandparents, parents, and 17-year-old brother. Also arrested were Sefrioui, Chnina, who was suspected of issuing a fatwa against Paty, and four students who were suspected of taking money from the killer in exchange for identifying the teacher.

French police announced that there were more than 80 messages on social media from French people supporting the attacker. The French Minister of the Interior, Gérald Darmanin, ordered that the Grande Mosque de Pantin was to be closed for six months. The mosque, which has about 1,500 worshippers situated just north of Paris, was ordered closed for having published videos inciting violence against Samuel Paty. The mosque removed the posts after the murder and expressed "regret" over publishing the videos and published instead an announcement condemning the "savagery" of the teacher's killing.

Two days after the murder, a defence council ordered the deportation of 231 foreign citizens who were known to security services in the Fiche S register. Of those, 180 were in prison and the rest were to be arrested. The interior minister Gérald Darmanin demanded dissolution of two Islamic NGOs: Collective Against Islamophobia in France (CCIF) and Barakacity, which he described as "enemies" of the state. Both NGOs were accused by Darmanin of taking part in a social media campaign against the teacher, launched by the father of one of his pupils. The CCIF denied participating in such a harassment campaign and stated it was taking legal action against the minister. Despite criticism by Amnesty international, European Network Against Racism, Human Rights Watch and Human Rights League (France), the Council of Ministers of France dissolved the CCIF at the beginning of December. According to some sources, public inquiry into the killing did not sustain the theory that the CCIF was implicated in Paty's death in any way.

On 21 October a national memorial for Paty, prepared in consultation with his family, was held at the Sorbonne. President Macron awarded the Légion d'honneur posthumously to Paty. Texts read at the ceremony included Jean Jaurès's Lettre aux instituteurs et institutrices (lit. 'letter to the teachers'). In an address of around 15 minutes, Macron described Paty as "a quiet hero" and stated that "we will not give up cartoons". Macron also announced that the "Sheikh Yassin Collective" founded by Sefrioui to support Hamas would be dissolved, as having been "directly implicated" in the murder. The government was reported to be preparing to dissolve a further fifty organizations connected with radical Islam.

On 23 October, the Bibliothèque nationale de France published an introduction to Jaurès's letter, linking to a digitized version of its entire content. La Dépêche, the newspaper in which the letter had originally been published in 1888, republished the text a few days later. Meanwhile, minister Blanquer had selected the letter to be read in schools when pupils would return there after a two-week holiday (Paty had been murdered at the start of that holiday shortly after lessons had finished). The fact that only bowdlerized versions of Jaurès's letter had been distributed to the schools was criticised, for example in an article published in Libération, which prompted the minister to make the entire letter available, just in time for the commemorations for Paty which were held in schools all over France at 11:00 on Monday 2 November. That Monday was the first schoolday since the attack and the Prime Minister of France, Jean Castex, attended the commemoration at Paty's school, the Collège Bois-d'Aulne, which itself did not open to its pupils until the following day. During the commemorative ceremony on 2 November across France, more than 400 incidents of threats and interruptions were recorded; several youths were arrested.

Although the French government promised to reinforce security in schools, another teacher, Dominique Bernard, was killed three years later in the 2023 Arras school stabbing, a similar incident.

=== Prosecutions ===
By 22 October seven people had been charged, of which five were in police custody (the two schoolchildren were legal minors). Three of Anzorov's friends were charged with abetting in the crime: Naim Boudaoud and Azim Epsirkhanov were accused of "complicity in a terrorist murder" and Chnina of "terrorist association". One of the pair accused of complicity was alleged to have assisted Anzorov in acquiring a weapon, while the other drove him to the scene of the crime. Chnina was accused of communicating by text message with Anzorov and of organising the campaign of hate against Paty; he had made videos insulting the teacher and demanding his suspension. Sefrioui, who also appeared in videos castigating Paty, was himself in custody, and Gérald Darmanin told radio station Europe 1 that Chnina and Sefrioui had issued a fatwa condemning Paty. The schoolgirl was charged with slander.

By 6 November, 10 people were being prosecuted, including another 18-year-old of Chechen origin, a French 18-year-old, and a 17-year-old girl, all charged with "criminal terrorist conspiracy" having been arrested in eastern France, far from either Paris or Évreux.

In Pontoise, an Algerian man was convicted of glorifying terrorism and sentenced to six months in custody for calling the murderer a martyr; he was to be deported at the end of the sentence and banned from France for a decade. Three people between the ages of 15 and 17 were arrested and charged on Friday, 6 November with "supporting terrorism", having made threats during the national commemorations of Paty's life that Monday. Further prosecutions were planned in around a dozen of the more serious incidents of over 400 interruptions of the commemoration that took place on the same day according to the education minister Jean-Michel Blanquer.

In December 2023, six teenagers were found guilty and sentenced in connection with the murder. They were all given brief or suspended prison sentences, with provisions to stay in school or work during their terms and undergo regular medical checkups.

On 20 December 2024, eight people were convicted for the role in Paty's murder. Boudaoud and Epsirkhanov received sentences of 16 years, while Chnina was given a 13-year sentence. Sefrioui was sentenced to 15 years.

=== Law against Islamist extremism ===
After the murder of Paty, a bill was put forward to fight Islamist extremism and separatism to fight the roots of jihadist violence. It was approved by the National Assembly in February 2021.

A new bill was introduced, which makes it unlawful to threaten a public servant in order to gain an exception or special treatment which carries a penalty of up to five years in prison. The legislation expands the powers of authorities to close places of worship and religious organisations when they promote "hate or violence". The law requires religious funds from abroad exceeding €10,000 to be declared and the relevant accounts to be certified, so as to regulate the donations from countries such as Turkey, Qatar and Saudi Arabia. Millions of euros in funding had previously reached France from countries such as Turkey, Morocco and Saudi Arabia.

It provides stricter rules for allowing home-schooling in order to prevent parents taking children out of school in order to let them pursue their education in underground Islamist institutions. Doctors performing virginity tests would be subject to fines or prison sentences. These changes were prompted by a number of cases of Muslim men trying to have their marriages annulled by accusing their spouse of having had sex before marriage. Authorities will have to refuse residency documents to applicants who practise polygamy. Forced marriage, which The French ministry of the interior states affects 200,000 women in France, was likewise required to be combated with greater scrutiny from registrars.

== Other reactions ==
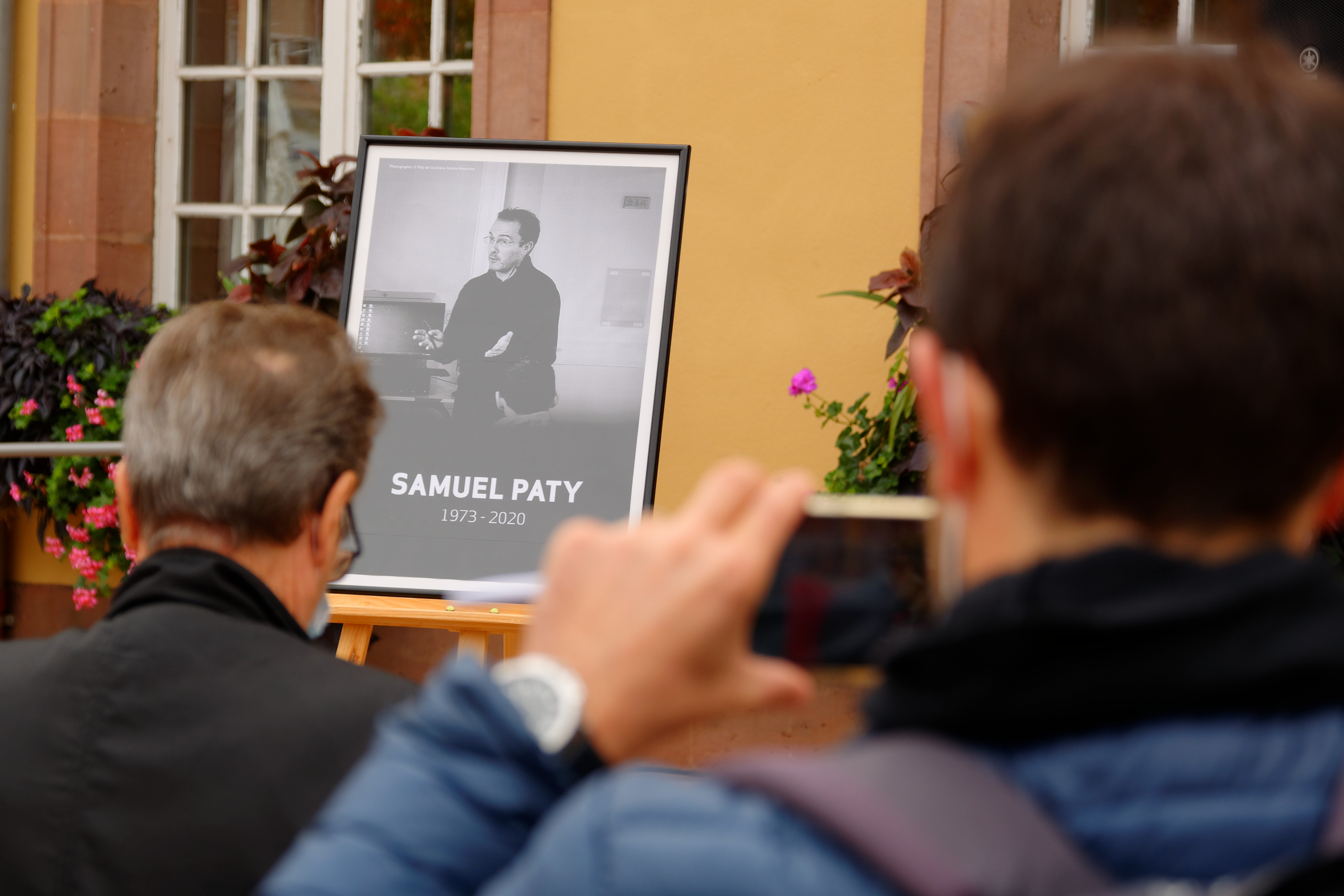
Memorial to Paty at demonstration outside the Hôtel de ville of Belfort, 21 October 2020

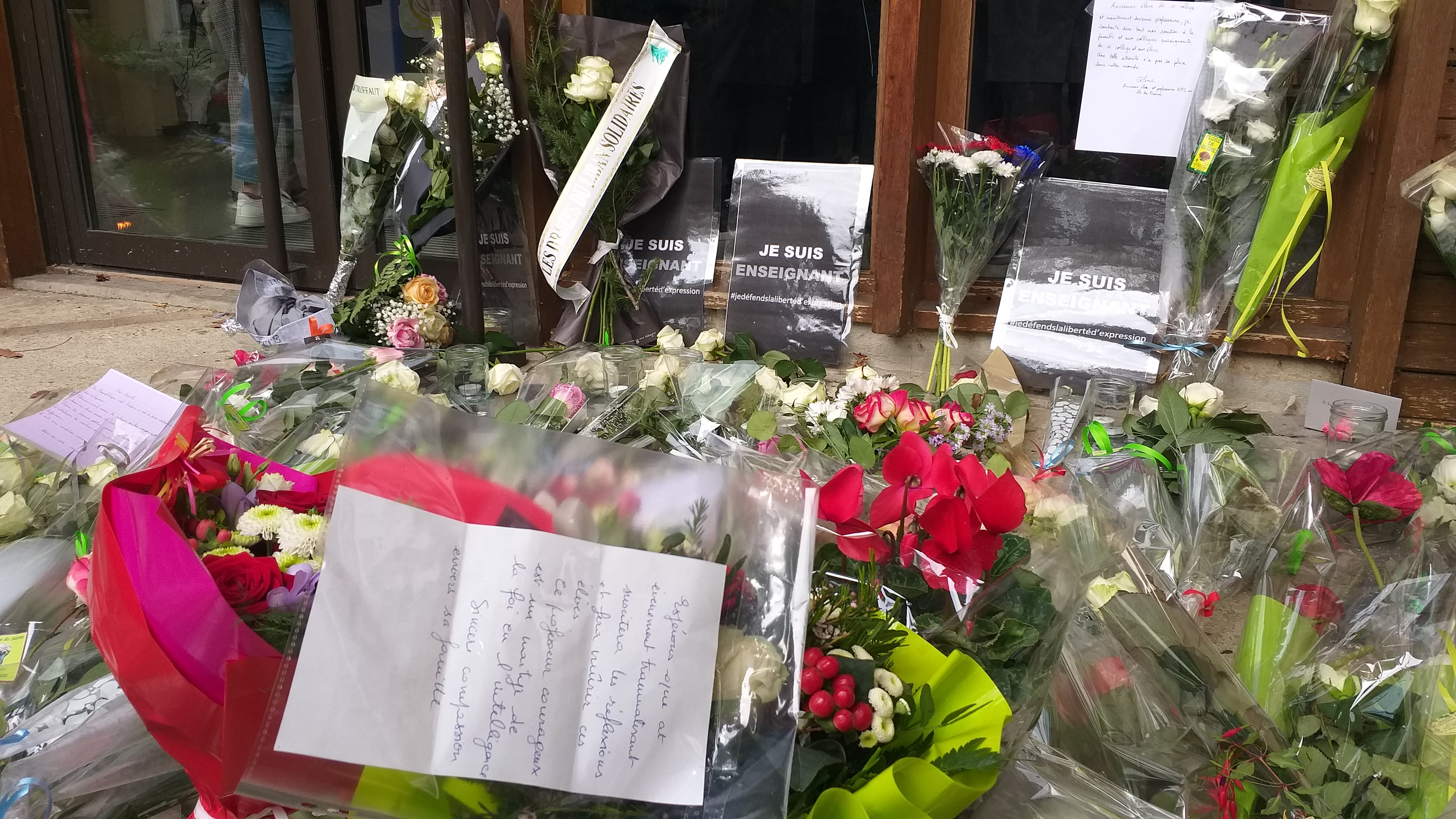
Flower arrangement in honor of Samuel Paty in front of the Bois-d'Aulne college, in Conflans-Sainte-Honorine

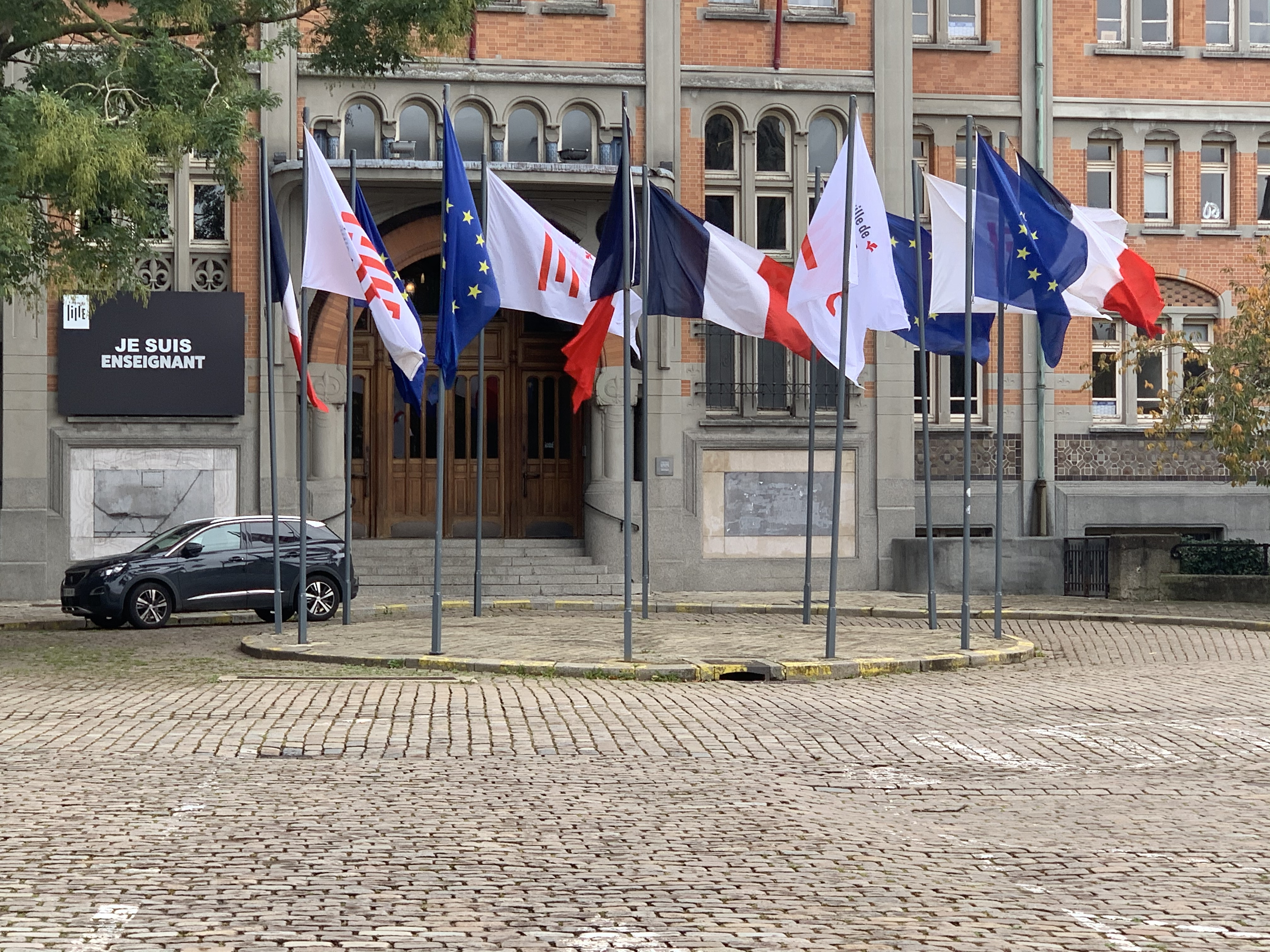
Je suis enseignant sign outside the Hôtel de ville de Lille

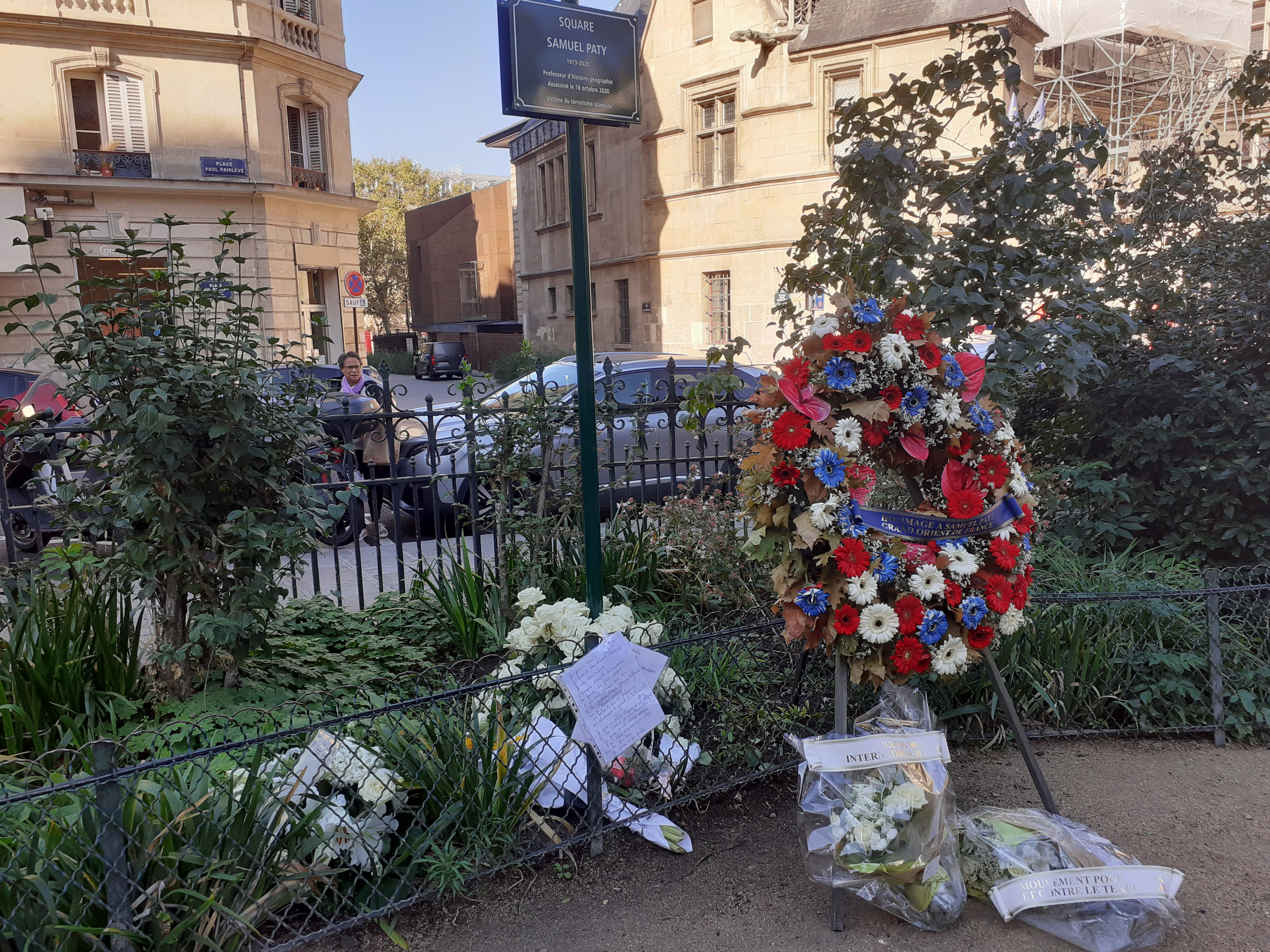
Square Samuel-Paty in 2021

The hashtags #JeSuisProf and #JeSuisEnseignant, both meaning "I am a teacher", were launched in support of the victim and in support of freedom of expression. The name alludes to the hashtag #JeSuisCharlie, launched as a token of solidarity in the aftermath of the 2015 Islamist attack on the satirical magazine Charlie Hebdo, which had published cartoons depicting Muhammad. Charlie Hebdo issued a statement expressing its "horror and revolt" and extending its support to the family and friends of Paty. Charlie Hebdo caricatures were displayed on regional authority buildings (French: Hôtels de région) in Toulouse and Montpellier.

Rallies in protest against the murder, and criticising the government's ineffective response to radical Islam, took place in Place de la République in Paris, and in other cities across France. The demonstrators held various placards with statements such as "Je suis Samuel" and "Schools in mourning" written on them. The demonstrators also chanted "Freedom of expression, freedom to teach", or sang "La Marseillaise," the French national anthem. Politicians, academics, and envoys joined the demonstrations across France. In Lyon around 12,000 joined the demonstrations, in Toulouse approximately 5,000 turned out, and hundreds more assembled in Nice.

The French Council of the Muslim Faith (CFCM), the main interlocutor of the public authorities on Islam, condemned the assassination and on Thursday, 22 October provided the Imams of France with a text that they could use as inspiration for their Friday prayers in response to the attack. In it, CFCM noted that "The horrible assassination ... reminds us of the scourges that sadly mark our reality: that of the eruption in our country of radicalism, violence and terrorism claiming to be Islam, claiming victims of all ages, all conditions and all convictions." "No, we Muslims are not persecuted in France," the authors continued. "We are sometimes targets of anti-Muslim acts, but others are also victims of hostile acts. In the face of these provocations, we must remain decent, serene and clear-sighted."

On 1 November 2020, the CFCM organized a meeting to discuss the training of religious executives and a plan to fight radicalization. Various avenues are studied, in particular "carrying out theological work on the misguided concepts of the Muslim religion" and "carrying out collegial work on the Friday sermon in order to disseminate a strong word from religious executives carried by imams". Other Muslims in France accused the government of a "heavy-handed clampdown" on their communities in the aftermath of the murder.

According to researcher Liam Duffy, some anglophone media reporting in Britain and the United States received criticism in France for misrepresenting the attack and presenting France as the villain. Of the two most influential newspapers, The New York Times and The Washington Post, neither used the term jihadism in their reports according to expert Hugo Micheron. In other American reporting, information on the problems caused by Islamist extremism was largely absent while there were numerous warnings of rising nationalism and a French "crackdown on Islam". The criticism did not encompass the Financial Times, which was instead praised for having interviewed teachers in France.

Many Muslims and religious leaders in France condemned the act. In a tweet, Chems-Eddine Hafiz, rector of the Grand Mosque of Paris, called on the imams of his federation to dedicate their preaching the following Friday to the memory of Samuel Paty and to the fight against Islamist terrorism. According to Europe 1, "almost everywhere in France", imams respond to the rector's call, paying homage to the murdered history teacher. In a press release, the Rhône Mosques Council (French: Conseil des Mosquées du Rhône) condemned "blind hatred" and "murderous madness" and affirms that the religion of which the terrorist "proclaims himself does not recognize itself in him". The signatories of the press release, who come from around thirty mosques, declare that they are committed "to strengthening the study of the ideological foundations of extremist thought and the fight against those who feed it, feed it and finance it". The website Saphirnews published a joint statement of 30 imams calling on "Muslim youth to go to qualified imams and theologians, in their spiritual quest, so as not to fall into obscurantism".

The attack on Paty polarised French people and politicians alike and led to a public debate on how Islam should be integrated or assimilated into French secular society. One theme of the debate concerned the education of imams which in part come from abroad. The terrorist attack also highlighted the problems France faced with integrating foreigners into the French society in a country which was becoming increasingly racially and ethnically diverse and the political establishment formed a consensus that two or three generations of "newcomers" had struggled to integrate. An opinion poll carried out by Institut français d'opinion publique (Ifop) found that 87% of the respondents considered the secularist society in France (French: Laïcité) was under threat and 79% agreed that Islamism had declared war on France and the French Republic. The poll found that 89% of the respondents thought the threat of terrorism was high, 38% of which said it was very high. This was a significant increase when compared with the data of the previous month, though the statistic had exceeded the 50% mark during the spate of Islamist attacks in France during 2015.

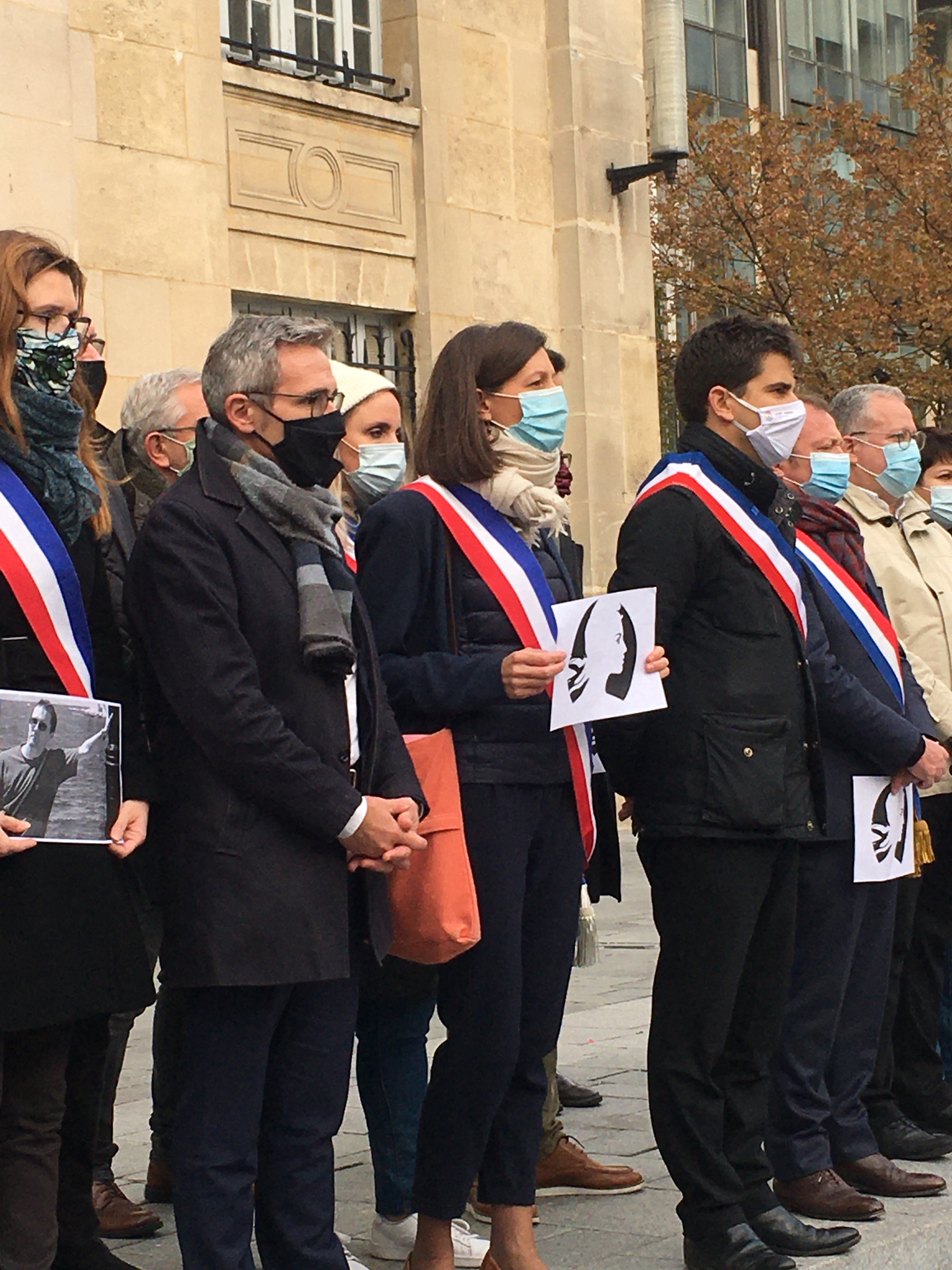
Tribute to Paty, in front of the town hall in Seine-Saint-Denis

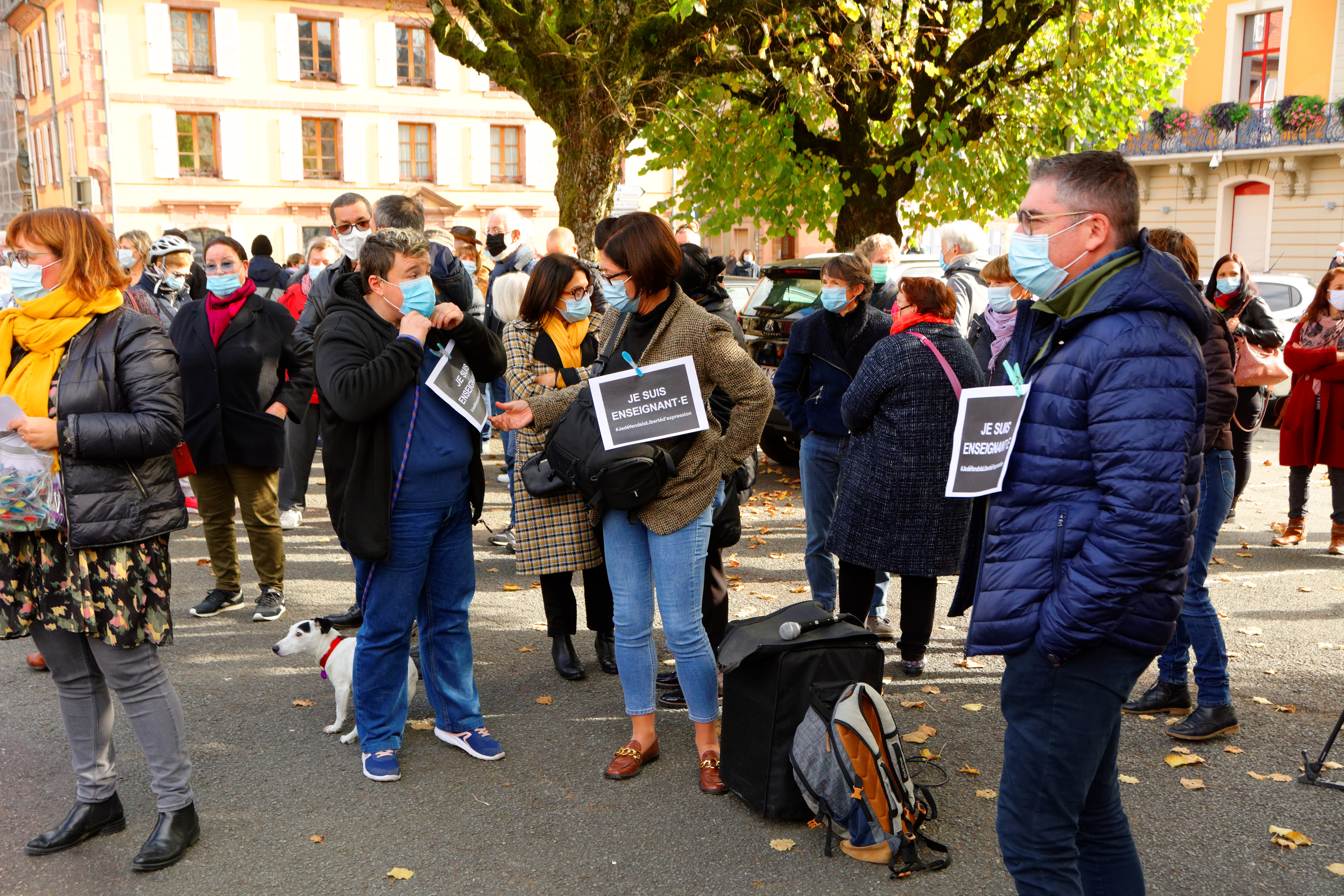
Gathering at the Place de la République, in Belfort, paying tribute to Paty

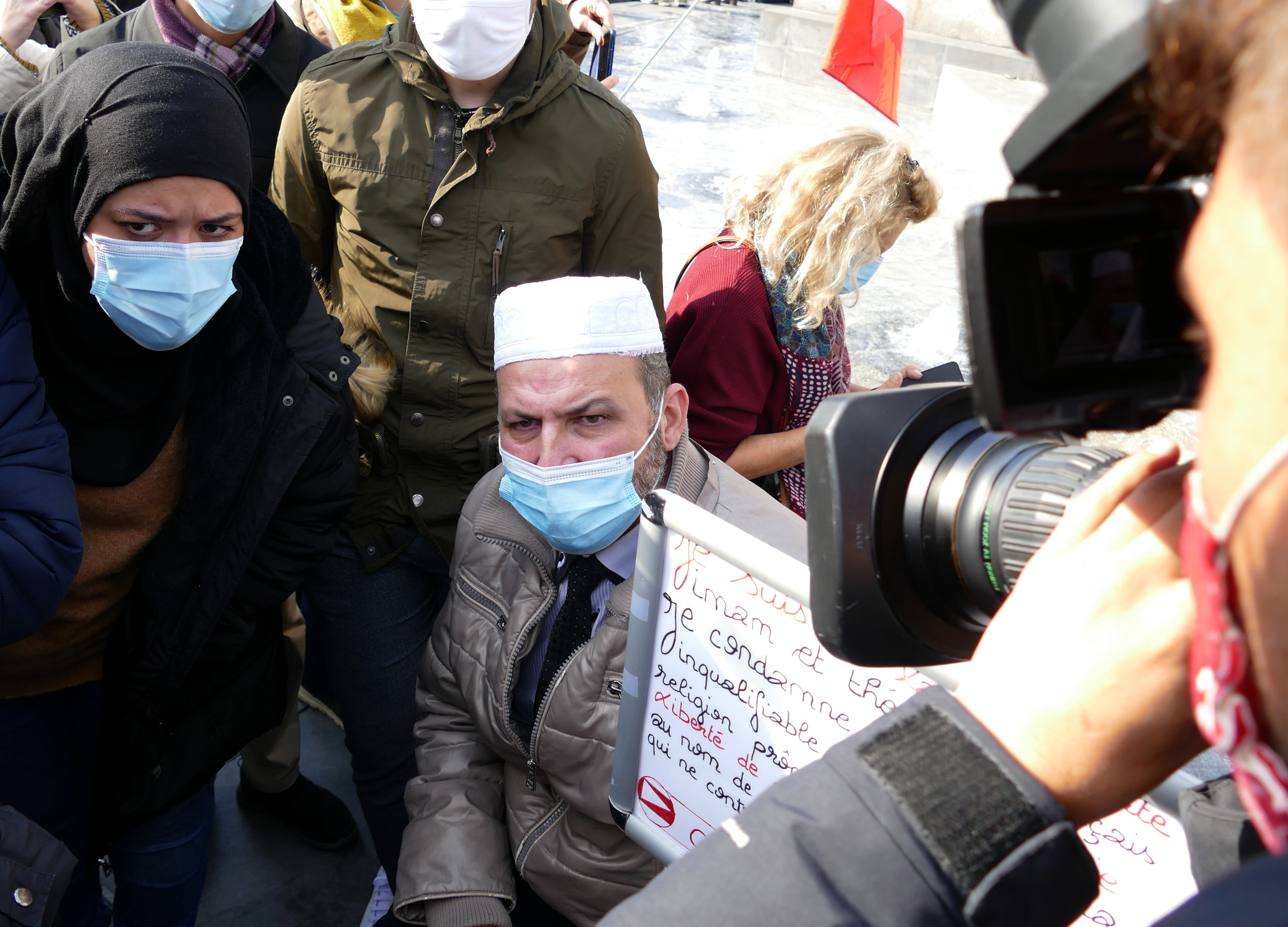
French Muslims in attendance at a tribute for Paty, in Place de la République

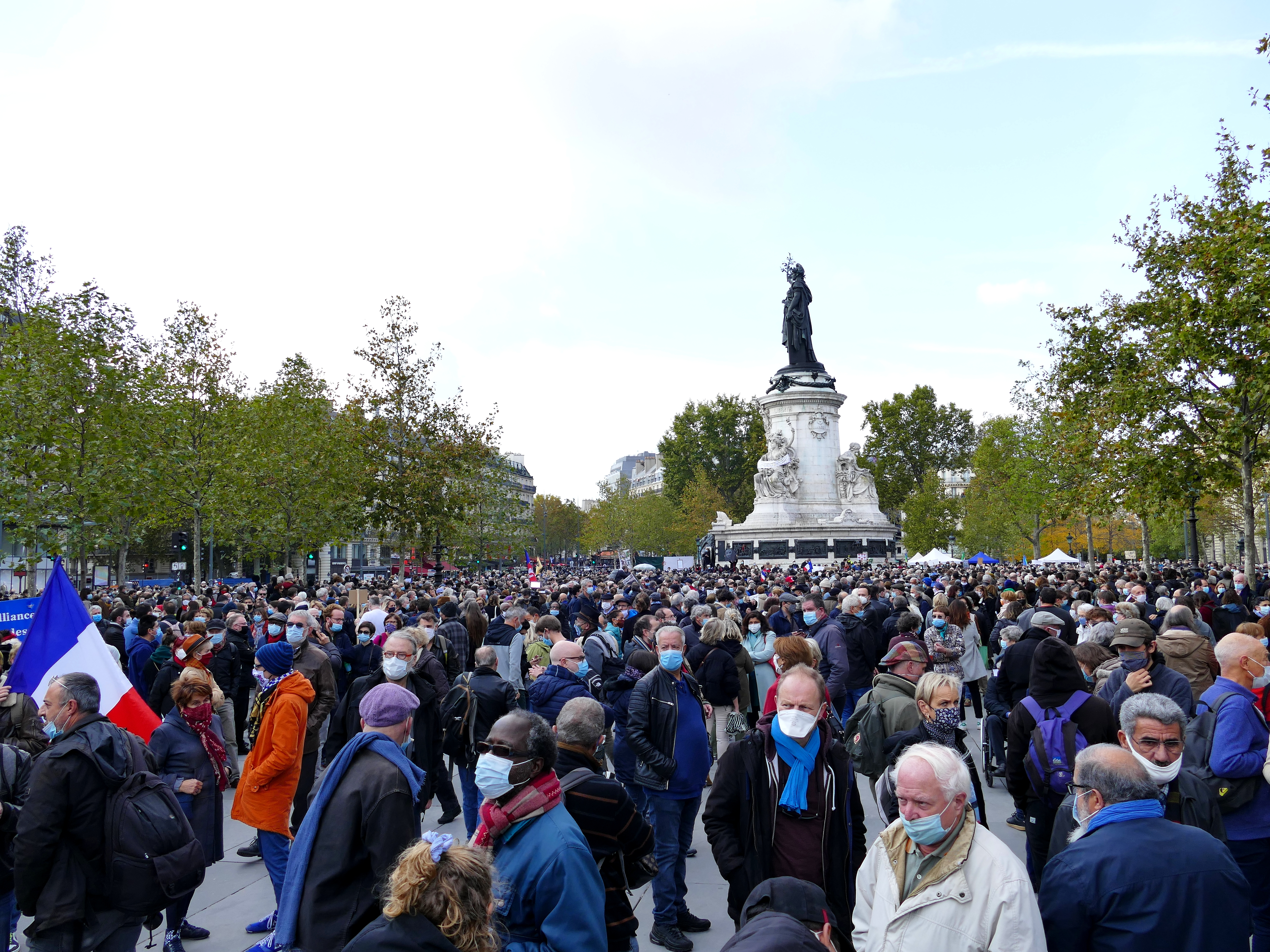
Gathering in homage to Samuel Paty, at Place de la République in Paris

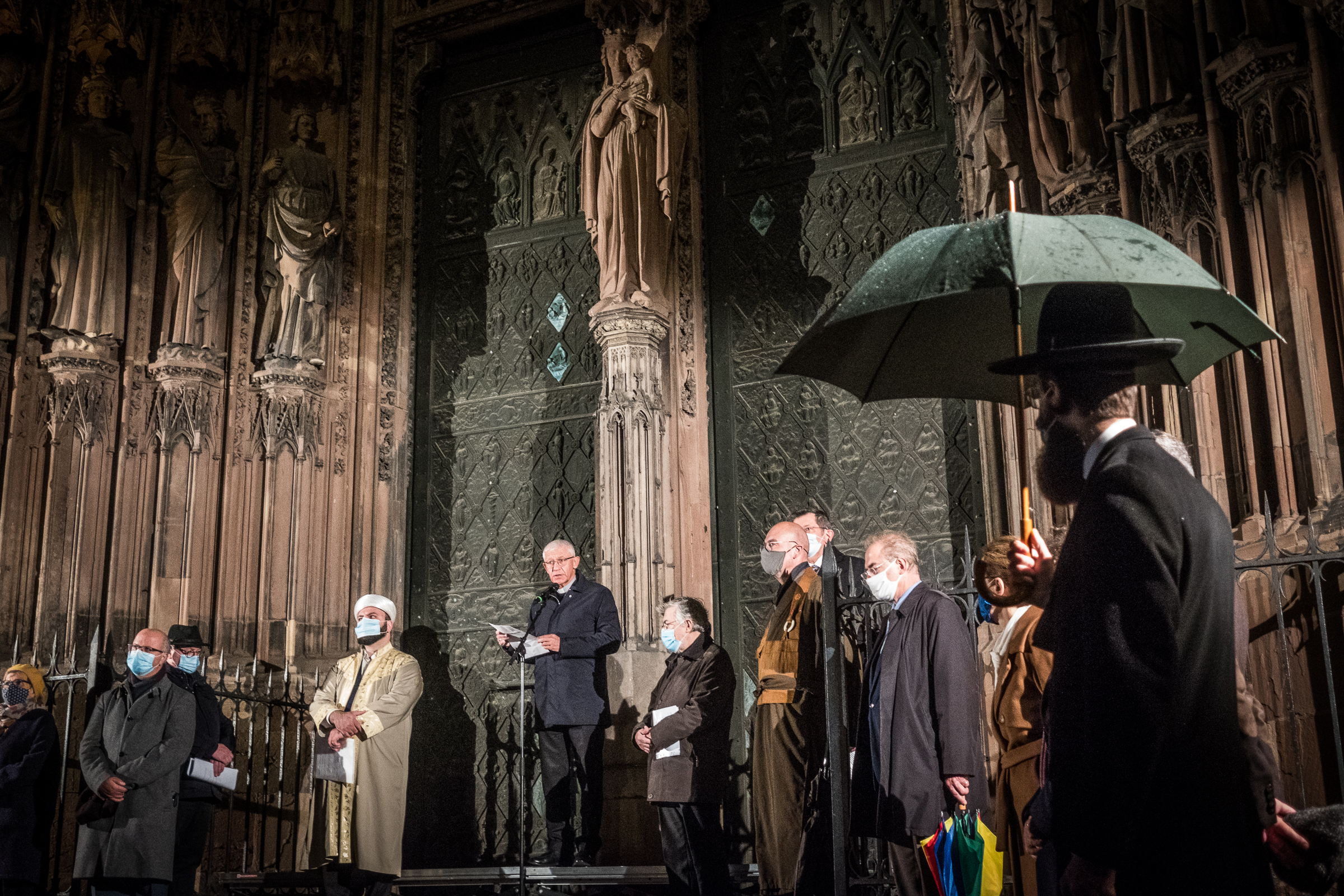
Interfaith gathering at Strasbourg Cathedral

=== Turkey; Erdoğan–Macron dispute ===
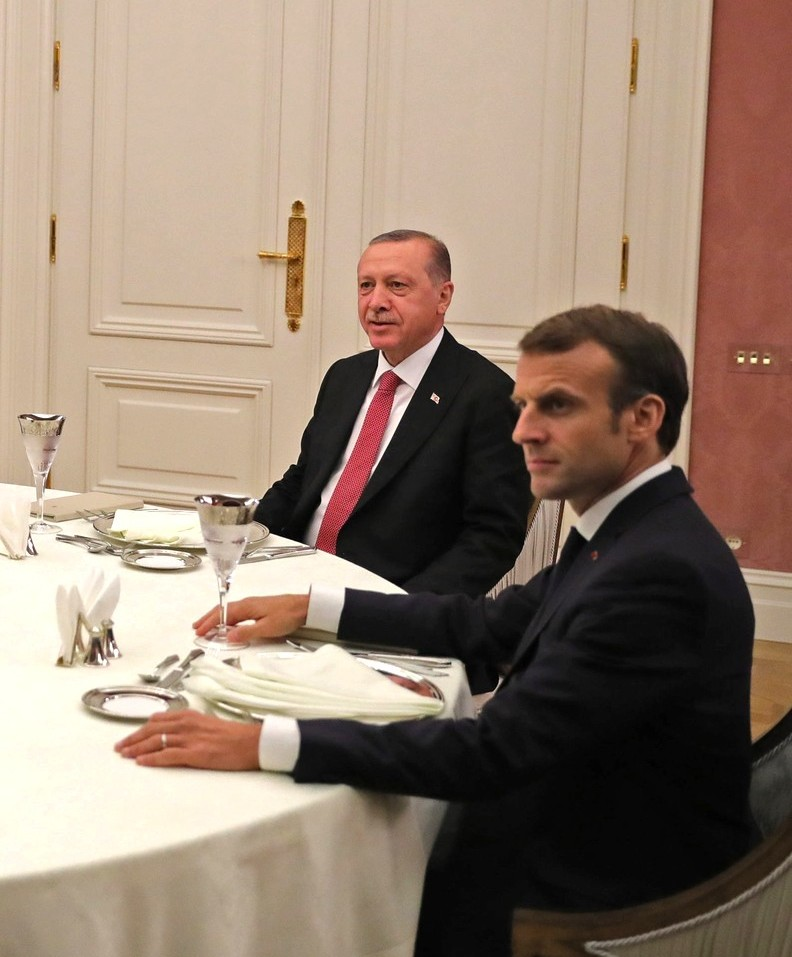
Emmanuel Macron, right, and Recep Tayyip Erdoğan in Istanbul in 2018

The position which was taken by Macron was condemned by the AK Party, Turkey's ruling party; the Nationalist Movement Party; the Republican People's Party, the party which represents the secular opposition; and the Good Party, but one opposition party, the Peoples' Democratic Party, did not sign the joint declaration which condemned Macron's words.

Following actions and statements by Macron, such as his description of Islam as a religion "in crisis" worldwide, Turkish President Recep Tayyip Erdoğan questioned Macron's mental health and called for a boycott of French goods. Erdoğan claimed that Muslims in France were being "subjected to a lynch campaign similar to that against Jews in Europe before World War II", and he also stated that "European leaders should tell the French president to stop his hate campaign". Erdoğan asked "What's the problem of the individual called Macron with Islam and with the Muslims?" and "What else can be said to a head of state who does not understand freedom of belief and who behaves in this way to millions of people living in his country who are members of a different faith?"

In response to Erdoğan's remarks, France recalled its ambassador to Turkey, and a spokesperson for Macron said: "President Erdogan's [sic] comments are unacceptable. Excess and rudeness are not a method. We demand that Erdogan change the course of his policy because it is dangerous in every respect." In support of Macron, German government spokesman Steffen Seibert said of Erdoğan's behaviour: "They are defamatory comments that are completely unacceptable, particularly against the backdrop of the horrific murder of the French teacher Samuel Paty by an Islamist fanatic", while the Minister for Foreign Affairs, Heiko Maas, said Erdoğan's insulting language was "a particular low point". The Prime Minister of Italy, Giuseppe Conte, wrote that "personal insults do not help the positive agenda that the EU wants to pursue with Turkey", and the Prime Minister of the Netherlands, Mark Rutte, stated that his country "stands firmly with France and for the collective values of the European Union". The President of the European Commission, Ursula von der Leyen, was also supportive of Macron's position.

In response to Erdoğan's insults, Macron published a message on Twitter in English, French, and Arabic, stating: "Our history is one of a battle against tyranny and fanaticisms. We will continue, … we respect all differences in a spirit of peace. We will never accept hate speech and we defend reasonable debate. We will continue. We hold ourselves always on the side of human dignity and universal values".

In response to Erdoğan's position, Charlie Hebdo published a cartoon which mocked the Turkish president on the front page of its magazine on 27 October. On Twitter, Fahrettin Altun, Erdoğan's press secretary, wrote that "We condemn this most disgusting effort by this publication to spread its cultural racism and hatred".

=== Other countries ===
After President Macron defended the publication of cartoons in a tribute to Paty, there were calls in some Muslim countries to boycott French products. Egyptian President Abdel Fattah el-Sisi, the Malaysian government, and the Foreign Ministry of Morocco said that freedom of expression does not apply to insulting Islam or Muslims, and Prime Minister of Pakistan Imran Khan said that Macron was promoting Islamophobia. Some French goods were removed from shops in Jordan, Kuwait, and Qatar, and hundreds of travel agencies in Kuwait suspended booking flights to France. Protests were also held in Bangladesh, Iraq, and Libya against Macron and his defense of the caricatures.

The Egyptian Foreign Ministry, the Indian Ministry of External Affairs, the Saudi Arabia Foreign Ministry, and the Turkish Ministry of Foreign Affairs condemned the murder, with the Indian ministry also condemning personal attacks against Macron.

Prime Minister of Canada Justin Trudeau said that freedom of expression has limits, citing the example of shouting fire in a crowded theatre. Trudeau's remarks were criticized in Canada and in France. Trudeau subsequently clarified his position to reaffirm the importance of defending freedom of expression.

In Iran, the French delegation was summoned to protest what the government described as France's permission of "hatred against Islam under the guise of support for freedom of expression". Clerics at the Shia holy city of Qom denounced Macron and the Charlie Hebdo cartoons, calling for economic sanctions against France from Iran and the wider Islamic world.

In Qatar, a week of French cultural events at Qatar University was postponed on account of what described as "deliberate attack on Islam and its symbols".

Ramzan Kadyrov, Head of the Chechen Republic, one of the federal subjects of Russia, criticized Macron's position on free speech. He wrote: "You are forcing people into terrorism, pushing people towards it, not leaving them any choice, creating the conditions for the growth of extremism in young people's heads. You can boldly call yourself the leader and inspiration of terrorism in your country". Kadyrov, once a rebel in the First Chechen War, had recently supported Russia in the military suppression of the Islamist insurgency in the North Caucasus and sought to minimize the significance of the killer's place of birth by pointing to his upbringing in France. He wrote on Instagram that showing cartoons of Muhammad was not to be labelled free speech. According to French news magazine Marianne, the Chairman of the Parliament of the Chechen Republic Magomed Daudov glorified the murderer of Samuel Paty. On September 22, 2021, he affirmed, in a video broadcast live on his Instagram account, that the murderer of Samuel Paty was a “young person, killed because he opposed the caricature of the Prophet” and “that he died in jihad”.

An independent member of the Assembly of the Representatives of the People of Tunisia, Rached Khiari, who was initially elected on a religious right-wing platform with al-Karama, justified the attack on Facebook. The public prosecution service in Tunisia opened an investigation into his comments; the spokesman of the Court of First Instance in Tunis and deputy public prosecutor said the comments were classifiable as a crime of terrorism, as anti-terrorism legislation punishes the glorification or praise of terrorist attacks with a sentence of up to five years in prison.

=== International organisations ===
Leaders of the 27 member states of the European Union released a joint statement condemning the attack on Samuel Paty and the 2020 Nice stabbing encouraging dialogue and understanding between societies and religions. They called the attacks an assault on their values.

Sheikh Muhammad bin Abdul Karim Issa, Secretary General of the Muslim World League, said "acts of violence and terrorism [were] crimes in all religions," suggesting further that such situations might be avoided by "refrain[ing] from stirring hatred by insulting religion." He made an appeal against the unnecessary incitement of violence through the circulation of incendiary literature.

The Organisation of Islamic Cooperation said that although it denounced "all acts of terror in the name of religion", it would continue to oppose the "continued publication" of "blasphemous cartoons". It added that it was the "suggestions of certain French leaders ... that risk submerging French–Muslim relations".

In a press statement released on 17 October 2020, Miguel Ángel Moratinos, High Representative of the United Nations Alliance of Civilizations (UNAOC), strongly condemned the murder, saying that "such heinous crime is unjustifiable whenever, wherever and by whomsoever committed".

== See also ==
- 2020 Nice stabbing
- 2022 Muhammad remarks controversy
- 2023 Arras school stabbing
- Islam and blasphemy
- Islam and violence
- Jyllands-Posten Muhammad cartoons controversy
- Satanic Verses controversy
- List of Islamist terrorist attacks
- Square Samuel-Paty in Paris
