= Square Samuel-Paty =

Green space in Paris, France

Coordinates: 48°51′00″N 2°20′39″E

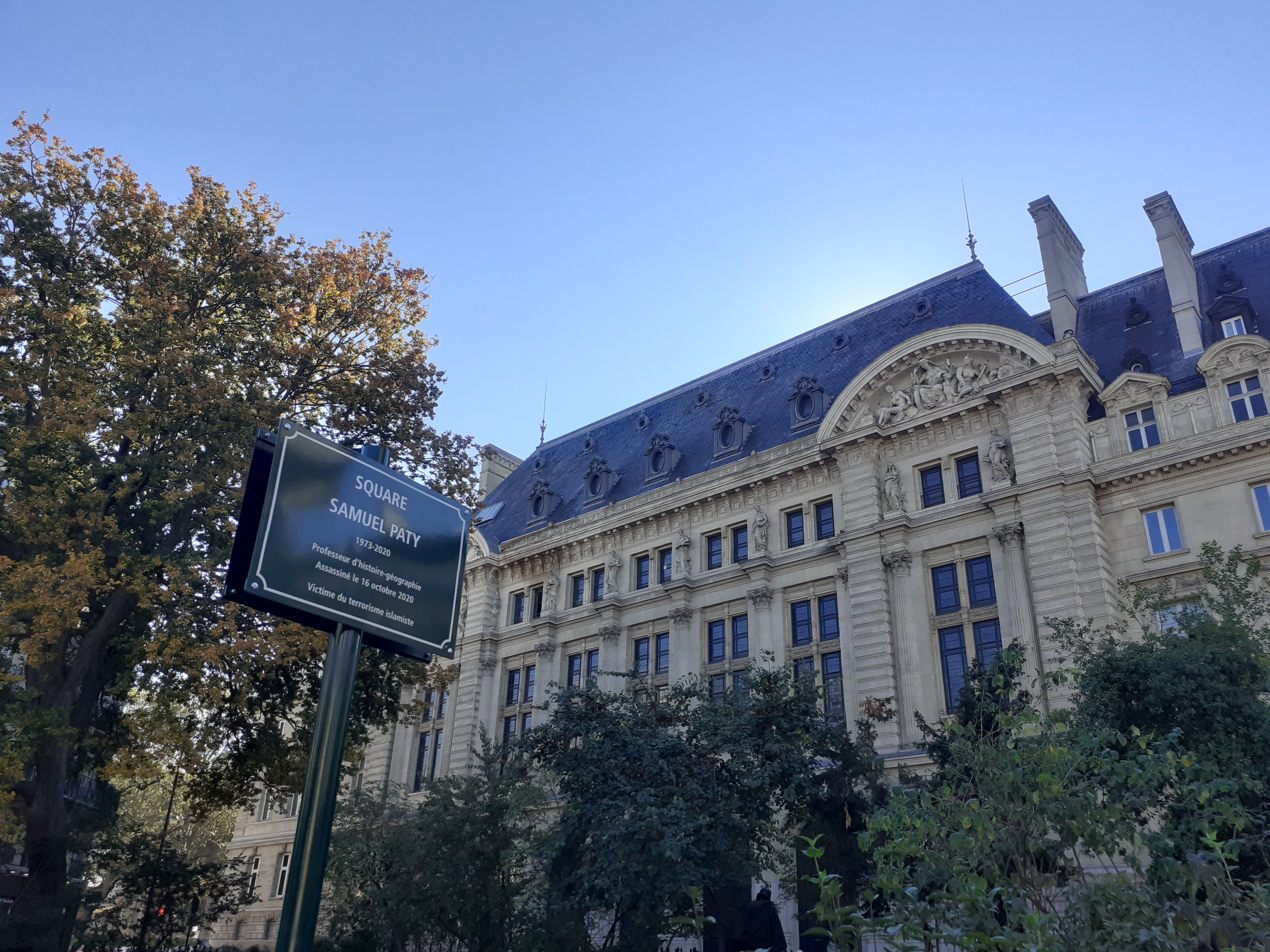
The Samuel Paty Square sign and the Sorbonne

The Samuel Paty Square is a green space located in the 5th arrondissement of Paris next to the Sorbonne and the Musée de Cluny.

== Location ==
The garden is located at the address 2, Place Paul-Painlevé, in front of the Sorbonne, in the heart of the historic quarter of the Latin Quarter, Paris.

This site is serviced by the neighbouring Cluny–La Sorbonne Métro station on Line 10.

== Origin of the name ==
The garden takes its name after French teacher Samuel Paty, assassinated in a terrorist attack on 16 October 2020 in Conflans-Sainte-Honorine, a suburb of Paris. Paty was killed and beheaded by an Islamist.

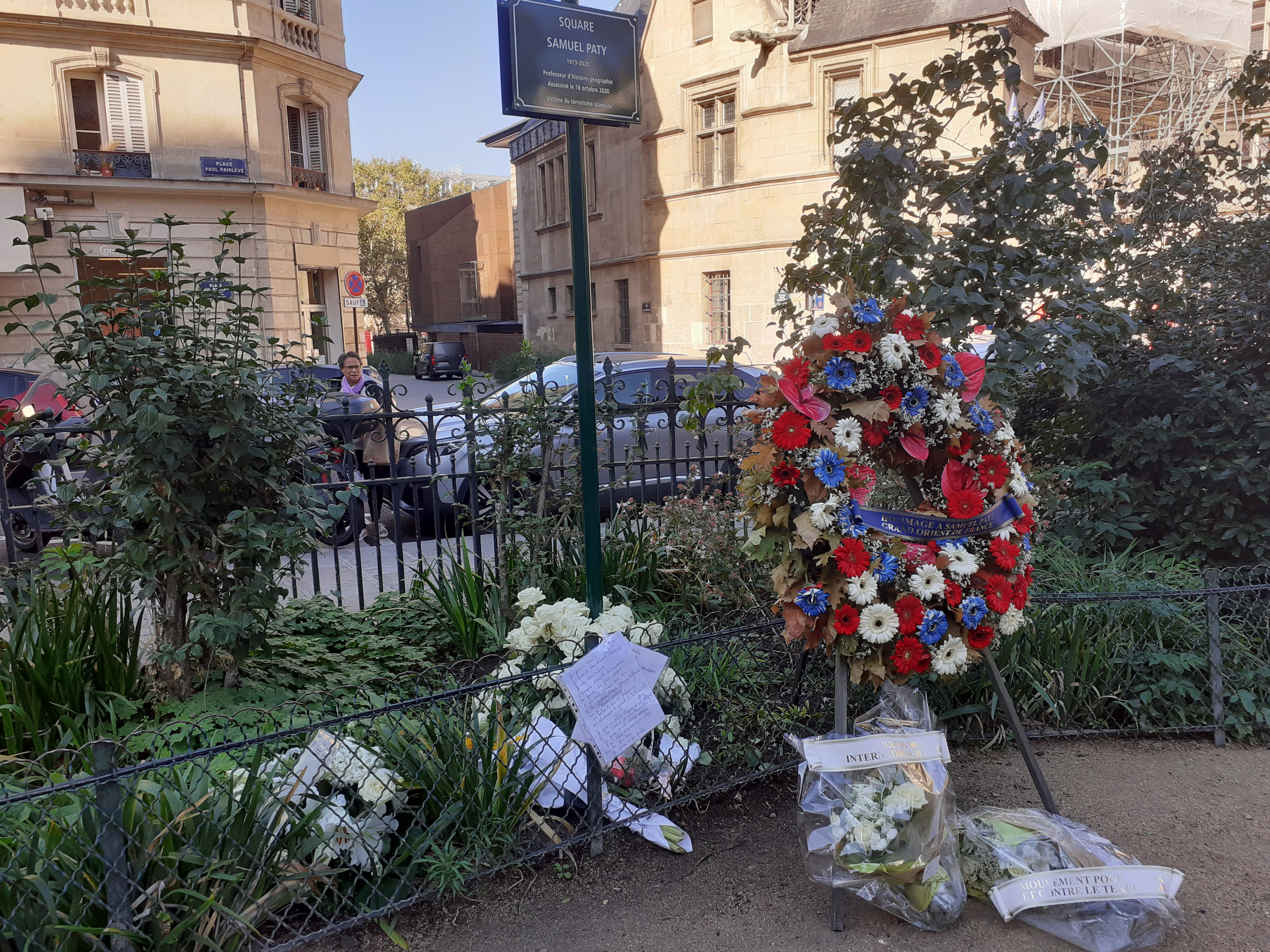
The Square Samuel-Paty in 2021

== Description ==
This park is a symbolic place in the middle of the historic Parisian neighborhood of schools and universities.

== History ==
The public garden was created in 1900 and originally called Square de la Sorbonne. It was renamed at the first anniversary of Paty's assassination.

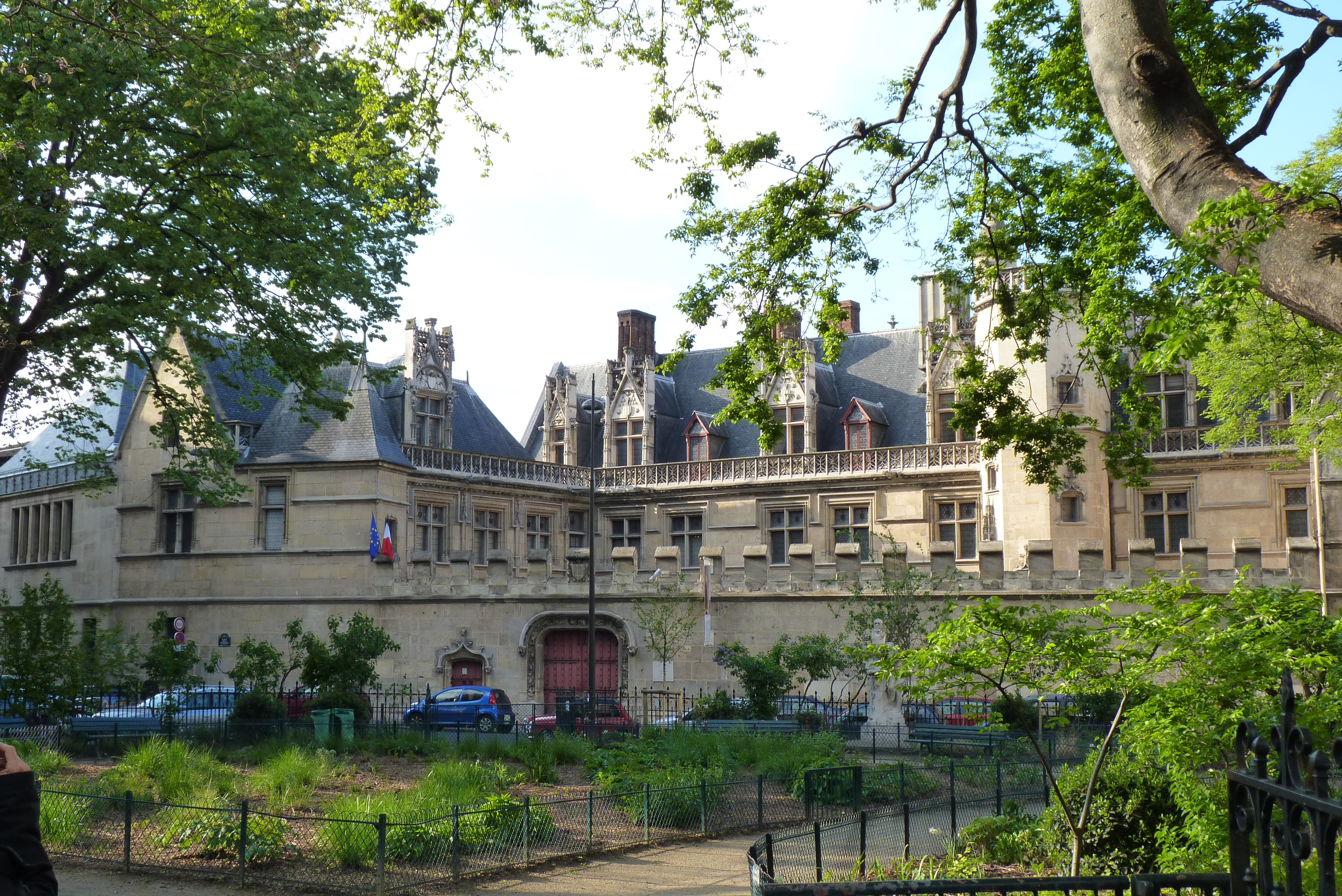
The Square Samuel-Paty and Musée de Cluny in the 5th arrondissement of Paris

== See also ==
- List of parks and gardens in Paris
- 5th arrondissement of Paris
- Murder of Samuel Paty
- Sorbonne
