= Éric Molinié =

French businessman (1960–2022)

- Born: 30 November 1960; Paris, France
- Died: 21 December 2022 (aged 62)
- Education: Lycée Hoche; Lycée Sainte-Geneviève
- Alma mater: HEC Paris
- Occupation: Businessman

Éric Molinié (30 November 1960 – 21 December 2022) was a French businessman. He served as secretary-general of Dalkia, an energy company and subsidiary of Électricité de France (EDF).

== Biography ==
Disabled from birth, Molinié studied at the Lycée Hoche in Versailles where he received his Baccalauréat and was later admitted to HEC Paris (class of 1982). He then became an advisor to EDF's chairman on disability, then economic issues, and was later director of sustainable development. He also served as vice-president, then president of the French Equal Opportunities and Anti-Discrimination Commission from April 2010 to April 2011, vice-president of the Association des paralysés de France, and president of the Association française contre les myopathies.

Molinié twice served as a member of the social affairs section of the French Economic, Social and Environmental Council and a rapporteur for a study on French public hospitals. In 2005, he received the Prix Guy Crescent for his actions in support of people with disabilities.

Molinié was president of the SAMU Social of Paris from 12 October 2011 to 7 October 2013. On 4 May 2016, his memoir, titled Vivant !, was published by the Éditions Odile Jacob. In 2016, he became a member of the board of directors of the International Movement ATD Fourth World France. In 2018, he became secretary-general of Dalkia and was one of the few people in France to hold a senior corporate position.

Molinié died on 21 December 2022, at the age of 62.

== Decorations ==
- Knight of the Legion of Honour
- Officer of the Ordre national du Mérite (2011)
