= 2023 Arras school stabbing =

2023 Islamist attack in northern France

Arras school stabbing
- Location: 50.28783°N 2.77602°E; Lycée Gambetta-Carnot, Arras, Pas-de-Calais, France
- Date: 13 October 2023 about 11a.m.
- Target: School staff
- Attack type: Mass stabbing
- Weapon: Knife
- Deaths: 1
- Injuries: 3
- Motive: Islamic extremism
- Accused: Mohammed Mogouchkov

On 13 October 2023, a mass stabbing took place at Gambetta-Carnot school in Arras, Pas-de-Calais, France. Dominique Bernard, a French literature teacher, was mortally wounded in the throat and thorax by the attacker while trying to protect his students. Three other members of staff were injured in the attack: a PE teacher hit in the face, a security guard stabbed several times, and a maintenance worker injured in the cheek. The attack was partly filmed.

The accused, 20-year-old Russian Ingush Mohammed Mogouchkov, had previously pleded allegiance to the Islamic State, citing the October 7 attacks as partial inspiration in a video recorded before his attack. He has been held on remand on charges of murder in relation with a terrorist organisation, while his brother, 16 years old, is prosecuted for being an accomplice to murder. As of 2026, the Mogouchkov brothers remain in custody awaiting trial, alongside a cousin as a third accomplice.

== Background ==
Amid the Gaza war, Hamas leader Khaled Mashal called for a 'Global Day of Jihad' on October 13. The pronouncement led to widespread fears for the safety of both global Jewish communities, as well as the general public, resulting in numerous cancellations of public events, as well as increases in security and policing. As a precaution, numerous schools, both public and Jewish, were closed for the day.

== Attack ==
At around 11:00 CEST on 13 October 2023, the attack began in the school's car park. According to witnesses the suspect was heard shouting "Allahu akbar" during the attack. The attacker was confronted by a teacher and other members of staff including the headmaster before being detained by police.

According to the testimony of Martin-Roch Doussau, a teacher of philosophy at the Gambetta college, the terrorist was looking for a history teacher, which drew media comparisons to the 2020 murder of Samuel Paty, which was carried out by another Russian national with Islamist motives.

== Casualties ==
A French language teacher, Dominique Bernard, was killed while another teacher, a security guard and a cleaner were seriously injured.

== Suspect ==
Police said that the suspected attacker, Mohammed Mogouchkov, was a Russian man of Ingush origin who was born in 2003 and had moved to France with his family in 2008. Police had arrested him the previous day on suspicion of radicalism. The suspect was known to the French security services for his involvement with radical Islamism; he was arrested by police. The suspect was listed at a state list of potential dangerous persons and the domestic secret service DGSI is said to have, among other things, intercepted his telephone conversations. The suspect is a former student of the school and his younger brother was also detained on the same day. The prosecutor said that the attacker had pledged allegiance to the Islamic State and expressed his hatred for France.

== Aftermath ==
The funeral of Bernard was held in the Arras cathedral with screens used to broadcast the hundred watching outside. Bernard was posthumously awarded the Legion of Honor by French President Emmanuel Macron.

Immediately after the attack France mobilized at least 7,000 soldiers to be stationed around the country for an increase in security. Classes were canceled at the Gambetta-Carnot school where Bernard taught, and bomb threats were seen across the country, in airports, the Louvre Museum and the Palace of Versailles. The school was subject to a bomb threat after Bernard's death but as it had only been open to allow pupils and staff to pay tribute to Bernard and other victims, the process of evacuation was quick.

== See also ==
- List of terrorist incidents in 2023
- List of terrorist incidents in France
- Murder of Samuel Paty
- 2023 Brussels shooting
