= Murder of Hichem Miraoui =

2025 murder in France

- Location: Puget-sur-Argens, France
- Date: May 31, 2025
- Target: Foreigners and French people of foreign origin
- Attack type: Homicide shooting with suspected racial and terrorist motives
- Weapon: Firearm
- Deaths: 1 (Hichem Miraoui)
- Injuries: 1
- Victim: 2
- Motive: Islamophobia, xenophobia
- Accused: Christophe Belgembe

On 31 May 2025, Hichem Miraoui, a Tunisian hairdresser, was shot five times in Puget-sur-Argens, in the Var, in France. The crime is suspected to have been committed for racist and terrorist motives.

== The murder ==
On 31 May 2025, at around 10 pm, Hichem Miraoui, a Tunisian man aged around 46, was shot five times in front of his hairdressing salon by his neighbor, Christophe B., of French nationality. A second man, Afik B., of Turkish origin, was slightly injured in the hand.

== Suspect ==
Christophe B. is a 53-year-old man, a former welder, with no significant criminal record. He published videos on Facebook with Islamophobic and racist undertones before and after the attack, calling for a vote for the National Rally and to "remove immigrants." Le Parisien and the website Les Jours trace the beginning of his radicalization to the attacks of January 2015. It also relays comments from Marine Le Pen, Jordan Bardella and David Rachline. A sport shooting enthusiast, he announced before the events his intention to "say stop to the Islamics" and to "make a small impact just by leaving [his house], all the sans-papier (undocumented immigrants)." Before the incident, he tagged the victim's scooter with racist insults

== Investigation and procedure ==
The investigation has been entrusted to the National Anti-Terrorism Prosecutor's Office (PNAT), the first case of its kind to be referred to this office for a murder potentially linked to the French far-right. The PNAT indicates that before this crime, it had already taken on 15 other cases involving far-right suspects since its creation in 2019, but none for homicide.

On 5 June 2025, Christophe B. was indicted for "murder and attempted murder in connection with a terrorist enterprise, motivated by race, religion, or origin." He acknowledges the facts but denies any racist or terrorist motive.

The Minister of the Interior describes the crime as "clearly racist", "possibly terrorist" and possibly "anti-Muslim."

== Reactions ==
The National Rally condemned the incident, while refusing to take any ideological responsibility for it. SOS Racisme, the MRAP, and several media outlets warned of the impact of far-right rhetoric on radicalization. Protests organized on June 8, 2025 in Marseille and Puget-sur-Argens brought together nearly 1,600 people.

In Tunisia, news of the murder of Hichem Miraoui created strong commotion among the population.

== Analysis and Societal Impact ==
For Mathieu Molard, editor-in-chief of StreetPress, a French news website, "there has been a politicization" of the identity debate.

According to RFI, a French public radio station, the murder of Hichem Miraoui constitutes "a turning point", as it is the first time that the PNAT has been in charge of the case and that the crime "has been explicitly described as a terrorist attack."

La Croix muses that this "racist crime ... illustrates the unprecedented level of racist offenses in France" while emphasizing that this level is probably underestimated as a large proportion of offenses do not result in a police report.

Political scientist and Islam specialist Haoues Seniguer and sociologist Philippe Corcuff see in this crime, as in the murder of Aboubakar Cissé at the mosque of La Grand-Combe the previous month, the result of "atmospheric Islamophobia", of "the prevalence of xenophobia in the public space", fueled by "a culture of suspicion towards Islam and Muslims."

Sociologist Dominique Boullier is concerned about the lack of moderation on the platforms used by the murderers to relay their racist propaganda, demonstrate their intent to kill, and then show or claim responsibility for their crimes. He also talks about "atmospheric racism."
