= Collective Against Islamophobia in France =

French human rights organisation

- Collectif contre l'islamophobie en France
- Abbreviation: CCIF
- Formation: 2003; 23 years ago
- Founder: Samy Debah
- Dissolved: 2 December 2020
- Type: Nonprofit, NGO
- Headquarters: Garges-lès-Gonesse, France
- Website: islamophobie.net

The Collective Against Islamophobia in France (French: Collectif contre l'islamophobie en France; abbreviated CCIF) was a French non-profit organisation, created in 2003 and dissolved in 2020, which had the mission to combat discrimination towards Muslims in France, providing legal support to victims of such discrimination. It annually reported acts it considered Islamophobic. The organisation received criticism about its use of the term Islamophobia, and suspicion of having Islamist links.

== Description and actions ==
The organisation was set up in 2003. One of its founders was the activist Samy Debah. The association is composed of 20 to 30 volunteers and one permanent lawyer. It releases annual figures on Islamophobic incidents in France. The CCIF contributed to propagate the concept Islamophobia in France. It defines it as "discriminatory acts or violence, against institutions or individuals, based on their affiliation, real or imagined, with Islam. These acts are provoked by ideologies and discourses that incite hostility and rejection of Muslims."

According to Amélie Barras, Associate Professor at the Social Science Department of York University: "The CCIF is of particular interest, in my view, because it could be considered to be the first litigating group on issues related to religious freedom and the public presence of Islam in France. Prior to its creation, Muslim associations were engaged in political lobbying, but no group was specialized in legal work."

The organisation has criticised, in 2004, France's French law on secularity and conspicuous religious symbols in schools, which outlaws the wearing of religious clothing in state-run schools. According to Haoues Seniguer, assistant director of the IISMM, in its attempt to abolish the 2004 law, the CCIF is acknowledging that in practice, the wearing of the hijab is non-negotiable in religious terms. This attempt was justified by the CCIF to protect women's rights and prevent anti-muslim discrimination. In 2016, the Human Rights League and the CCIF went to the Council of State to appeal the ban of burkini on the beach of the city of Villeneuve-Loubet, and won the case, which would have made jurisprudence, despite some other cities reluctant to repeal similar bans of the burkini. Human rights group such as HRL an CCIF announced they would file suit against each town maintaining the ban.

In 2011, it became a consultative member of the United Nations Economic and Social Council. In the 2016-2018 period, the CCIF received monetary subsidies from the city (€3,800) and the metropolis (€7,500) of Grenoble. It was financed by individual benefactors (especially muslims entrepreneurs), membership (around 10000 persons in 2016), dinner galas, and punctual project from foundations, such as the Open Society Foundation of George Soros who gave, in 2012, €35,000 to finance a campaign against islamophobia in France which has eventually been forbidden by RATP Group, because of its political and religious content.

== Critics ==
In France, the definition of the term Islamophobia has been subject to debates; according to the CCIF, Islamophobia is not an opinion but an offense. The use of the term has been criticized, by personalities such as Salman Rushdie, Manuel Valls, Caroline Fourest, Éric Zemmour, because it can in practice invalidate all criticism against Islam and indirectly institutes a ban on blasphemy. However, the CCIF does not use the term in this acceptance of criticism of Islam, but for hostility towards Muslims. The term is used in French courts for convenience, even if it does not appear namely in Law of France. The article 24 of the Press Law of 1881 gives legal ground in case of incitement to discrimination, hatred, or violence, against a person or a group for belonging or not belonging, to an ethnicity, a nation, a race, a religion.

Critics such as the journalists Caroline Fourest, Eugénie Bastié, Mohamed Sifaoui, Zineb El Rhazoui, the politician Marine Le Pen, or the political scientist Gilles Kepel, have accused the CCIF of having links to the Islamist group Muslim Brotherhood, or to have an Islamist agenda, which is denied by the organisation. With the controversial Marwan Muhammad, suspected of connivence with radical Islamism, who was spokesperson from 2010 to 2014, and then executive director in 2016 and 2017, came the first criticisms against the CCIF. According to a former specialist of Islam in the Minister of the Interior, Bernard Godard, the CCIF is autonomous, receive no aid from Muslim brotherhood. The newspaper Le Monde has checked its own archives of articles about CCIF from 2004 to 2020, and wrote that it is "often described as an association fighting anti-Muslim racism, never as a propagator of Islamism".

According to Timothy Peace, lecturer in politics at the University of Glasgow: "In its annual reports, the CCIF regularly points the blame at French politicians of all ideological stripes for encouraging 'political Islamophobia' and at the French government in particular for its inability to condemn this. Perhaps unsurprisingly, this organisation itself has come in for heavy criticism for its attempt to link political discourse with acts of discrimination and abuse."

== Dissolution ==
In October 2020, following the murder of Samuel Paty, the CCIF was one of 51 organisations listed to be inspected by the French government because of suspected links to Islamism; some of them, such as the CCIF, were deemed "separatist" according to the Interior Minister Gérald Darmanin. Darmanin tweeted: "I am going to propose the dissolution of CCIF and Barakacity, organisations that are enemies of the Republic". Several French politicians declared to be in favor of the dissolution, such as Manuel Valls, Julien Aubert, Bruno Retailleau, Nicolas Bay, Jordan Bardella.

Darmanin's call to dissolve the group was criticized by NGOs Amnesty international, and European Network Against Racism, concerned that this could undermine freedoms of expression and association.

It is alleged that the CCIF had provided legal resources to the father who had brought Paty to public attention. The organisation's response was that it was still in the process of researching the father's claim, and does not intervene in freedom of speech controversies like the one involving Paty.

In November, the CCIF announced it had already dissolved itself voluntarily shortly after moving its activities and headquarters abroad. It was nevertheless dissolved by decree of the Council of Ministers of France at the beginning of December. Human Rights Watch and France's Human Rights League denounced this decision. The Council on American–Islamic Relations offered its support.

The CCIF filed a complaint against Darmanin in the Cour de Justice de la République because of his unproven accusation of a direct involvement of the CCIF in the murder of Samuel Paty, and it has announced in a press release it will contest the decree in the Council of State. The judicial inquiry did not sustain the hypothesis of an implication of the CCIF in the murder.

== Reconstitution in Belgium ==
In 2021, the organisation declared it was relocating to Belgium's capital Brussels under a new name: Collectif contre l'islamophobie en Europe (CCIE). The move was followed by the security services of Belgium according to Belgian justice minister Vincent Van Quickenborne, who declared that in Belgium it was not planned to outlaw associations, in order not to undermine freedom of association, but that it was possible to prosecute extremist individuals. He drew a parallel to the radical group Sharia4Belgium which itself had never been dissolved but 30 of its members had been indicted in court proceedings.
