= Barakacity =

- Formation: 2008
- Founder: Idriss Sihamedi
- Dissolved: 28 October 2020
- Type: NGO
- Location: Évry-Courcouronnes, France
- Official language: Arabic, French
- Website: barakacity.com

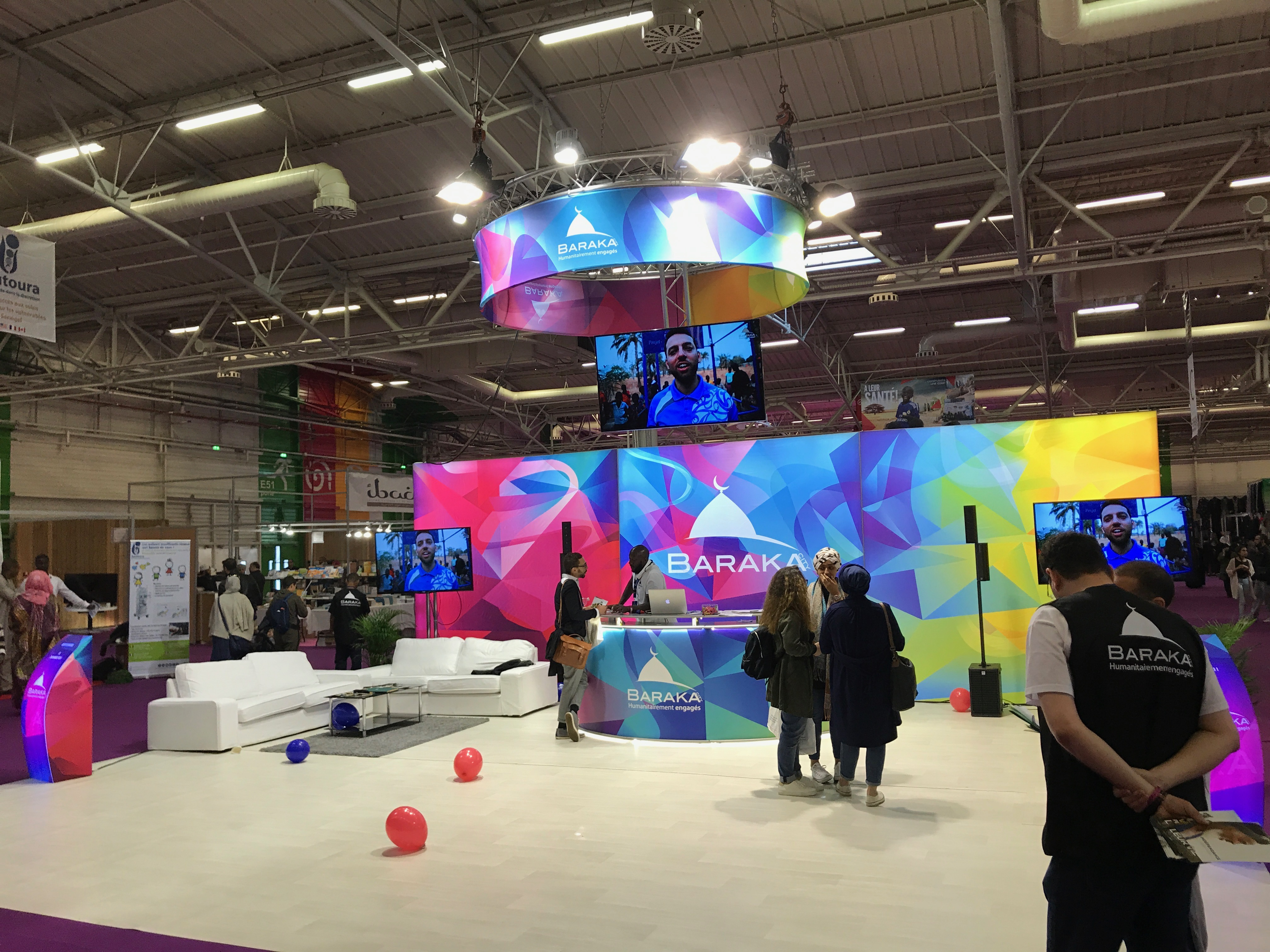
BarakaCity stand, Annual Meeting of Muslims in France, April 2017, Paris Le Bourget.

Barakacity was a Muslim non-governmental organization founded by Idriss Sihamedi and others in 2008; while it started in France, the organization had international reach. Its founders were characterised as Salafists. Its Facebook page had 715,000 followers and was popular among young Muslim believers. According to interior minister Gérald Darmanin, Barakacity was Islamist and had links to the Muslim Brotherhood.

It was dissolved in November 2020 by French authorities in the aftermath of the murder of Samuel Paty for "spreading radical ideas" using Facebook and Twitter. This was around the same time as the Pantin mosque was closed. After the dissolution, the chairman of the NGO appealed to Recep Tayyip Erdoğan for being granted asylum in Turkey.
