= French Equal Opportunities and Anti-Discrimination Commission =

French independent administrative authority

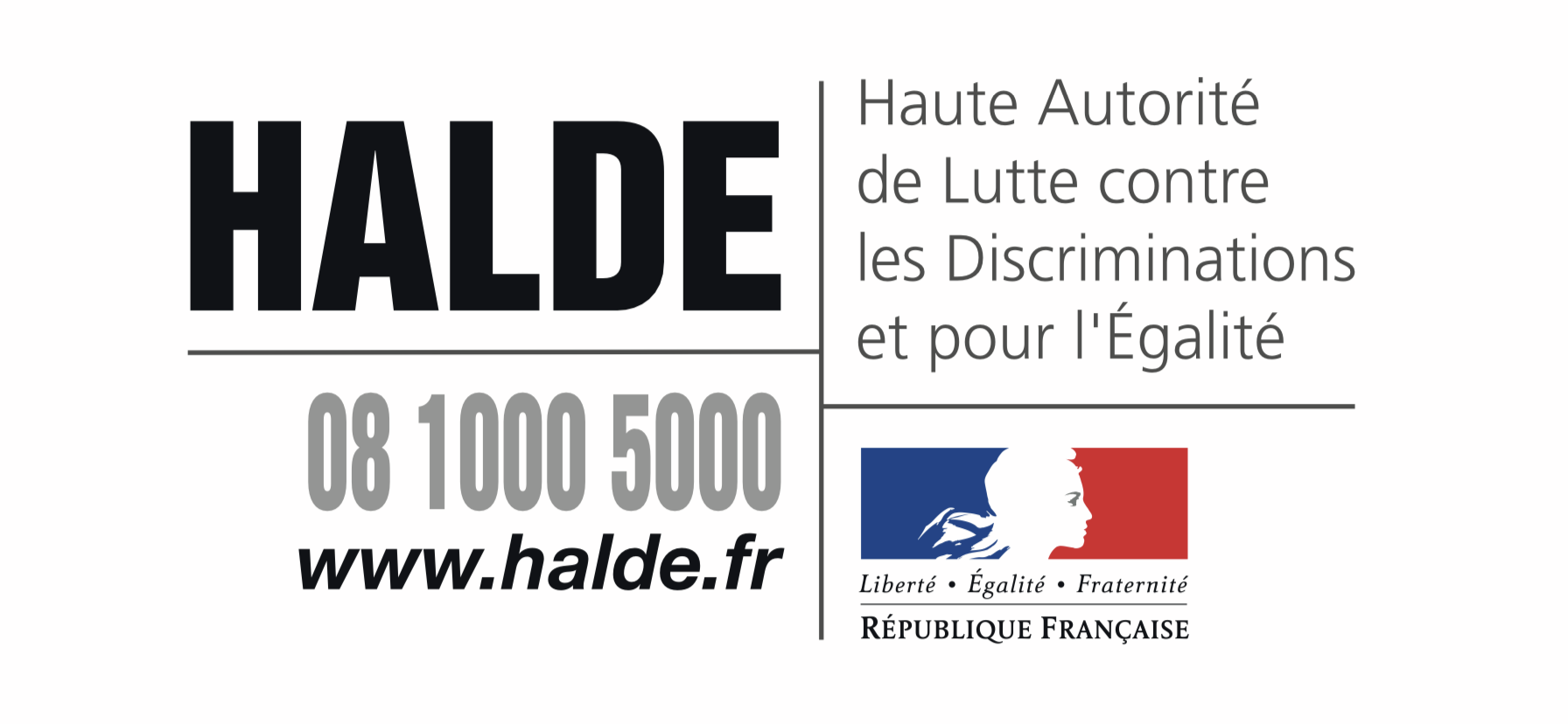
- Established: 30 December 2004 (22 years ago)
- Dissolved: 1 May 2011

The French Equal Opportunities and Anti-Discrimination Commission (French Haute autorité de lutte contre les discriminations et pour l'égalité or HALDE) was a French "independent administrative authority" which "has the right to judge all discrimination, direct or indirect, that is prohibited by law or an international agreement to which France is a signatory."

HALDE was created by law n° 2004–1486 on 30 December 2004, published in the Journal officiel on 31 December 2004, and dissolved in 2011 with its mission transferred to the Defender of Rights.

== Composition ==
HALDE had twelve members who were appointed by the French President for five-year terms. They could neither be expelled from their posts nor reappointed at the end of them. New members were added every thirty months, with five members being removed at this time (the president of HALDE stays, however). Thus, five of the first members were limited to 30 month-terms. These five were be selected randomly at HALDE's first meeting.

HALDE's members were chosen according to the following allotment:

- two members (one woman and one man) share the presidency—they were selected by the French president;
- two members (one woman and one man) were selected by the president of the French Senate;
- two members (one woman and one man) were chosen by the president par president of the French National Assembly;
- two members (one woman and one man) were chosen by the prime minister;
- one member (male or female) was chosen by the vice-president of the Council of State;
- one member (male or female) was chosen by the first president of the Cour de cassation;
- one member (male or female) was chosen by president of the French Economic and Social Council.

== Duties ==
HALDE was aided by a consultative committee named by itself, including people who "have an activity within the scope of the struggle against discrimination and for the promotion of equality."

Cases were submitted to HALDE in three different ways:

- Anyone who believes himself or herself to have been a victim of discrimination can appeal to HALDE, either independently, through a member of the National Assembly, through a senator or through a French MEP;
- HALDE can take pursue cases of discrimination itself, with the agreement of the alleged victim;
- Any group (that is at least five years old) whose charter aims to "fight discrimination or to help victims of discrimination" can accompany the case of an individual who believes to have been a victim of discrimination, if this individual wants this.

HALDE was entitled to lead various hearings as well as investigations; it could also send files to the procureur de la République. HALDE also promoted equality generally, and could recommend modifications of existing laws or rules, and published a public annual report concerning its performance of its duties.

== HALDE's members ==
President:

- Louis Schweitzer (former CEO of Renault), appointed 3 March 2005
- Jeanette Bougrab, 16 April 2010
- Éric Molinié, 10 December 2010

== See also ==
- Anti-discrimination law
- Human rights in France
- National human rights institutions
