= Islamophobia in France =

Prejudice towards Islam or Muslims in France

Islamophobia in France holds a particularly political significance since France has the largest proportion of Muslims in the Western world, primarily due to the migration from Maghrebi, West African, and Middle Eastern countries. The existence of discrimination against Muslims is reported by the media in the Muslim world and by the perceived segregation and alienation of Muslims within the French community. The belief that there is an anti-Muslim climate in France is heavily criticised by some members of the French Muslim community who terms it an 'exaggeration'.

Some French people hold a belief that Islam is opposed to secularism and modernity. This fear is sometimes considered to originate in the country's experience with terrorism and in the belief that Muslims are unable to integrate with the French culture.

A survey by the Pew Research Center in Spring 2014 revealed that out of all Europeans, the French view Muslim minorities most favorably with 72% having a favorable opinion. However, according to an opinion poll in 2009, 74% of Muslims in France believe that there is a conflict between living in devotion to one's religion and living in the western secular society. Muslim individuals' desire to integrate has been hindered by the reinforcement of cultural differences.

== Terminology ==
The word Islamophobie is itself subject of debate in France, due to a perceived lack of clarity on whether it designates the fear of Islam or the racism against Muslims, the first being a legal opinion and belief while the second constitutes a crime according to French law. Because of this, some authors urge to use racisme anti-musulman, literally "anti-Muslim racism", instead of Islamophobie, in order to differentiate between the distrust against Islam seen as a corpus of religious beliefs and the systematic hate and discrimination against Muslims.

== History ==
According to researcher Vincent Gassier "'institutional Islamophobia' or 'State Islamophobia' doesn't really exist in France". In the past, Islam was seen by many as a liberal religion especially during the time of 'les lumières' (18th century). Anti-religious views (especially against Christianity) have developed through France's historical tradition of segregation between state and church.

For a long time, conservative Muslims have been perceived as outsiders by the general French public, due to Islamic community structure and as a threat to individuality.

== Incidents ==
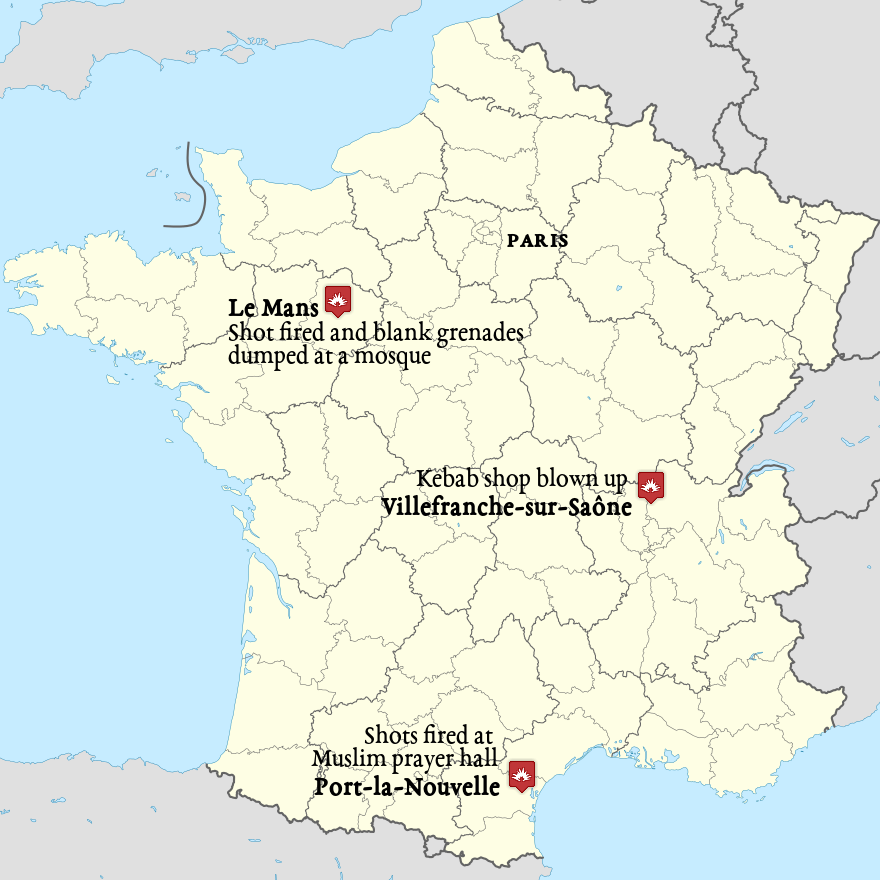
Two Mosques and one Muslim-owned kebab shop were attacked in France in January 2015.

=== Statistics ===
The Observatory of Islamophobia confirmed a 34.6% decrease in Islamophobic attacks in France in 2017.

According to the French Ministry of Interior, anti-Muslim attacks decreased from 121 in the year 2017 to 100 in the year 2018. These figures are based on complaints recorded in police stations. However, the French Council of the Muslim Faith said that the figures do not reflect the reality. The Collective against Islamophobia in France (CCIF) reported diametrically different figures based on the complaints made directly to their organizations. According to CCIF, Islamophobic attacks saw an increase from 446 in 2017 to 676 in 2018.

In 2019, the Ministry of Interior reported that anti-Muslim incidents increased by 54% from last year to 154 reported incidents. Islamophobic incidents saw a further jump of 53% with 235 incidents being reported.

Muslim women disproportionately face 81% of Islamophobic hate crimes.

== Justice system ==
Fundamental rights for Muslims in France are the same as any other French citizen, making it hard to introduce religious laws for some Muslims. The French adherence to the concept of Laïcité is in contradiction to some Muslim behaviors. In turn, forces resisting it are unable to cope with the strength of the growth in this concept. Political leaders emphasis that this is a protection of social cohesion within France, however it affects the inclusion of some Muslims.

=== Legislation impacting some religious behaviors ===
The objective to prevent discrimination between French citizens and to remove religious signs (Christianity, Islam, Judaism) from public space is seen as an injustice by some Muslims.

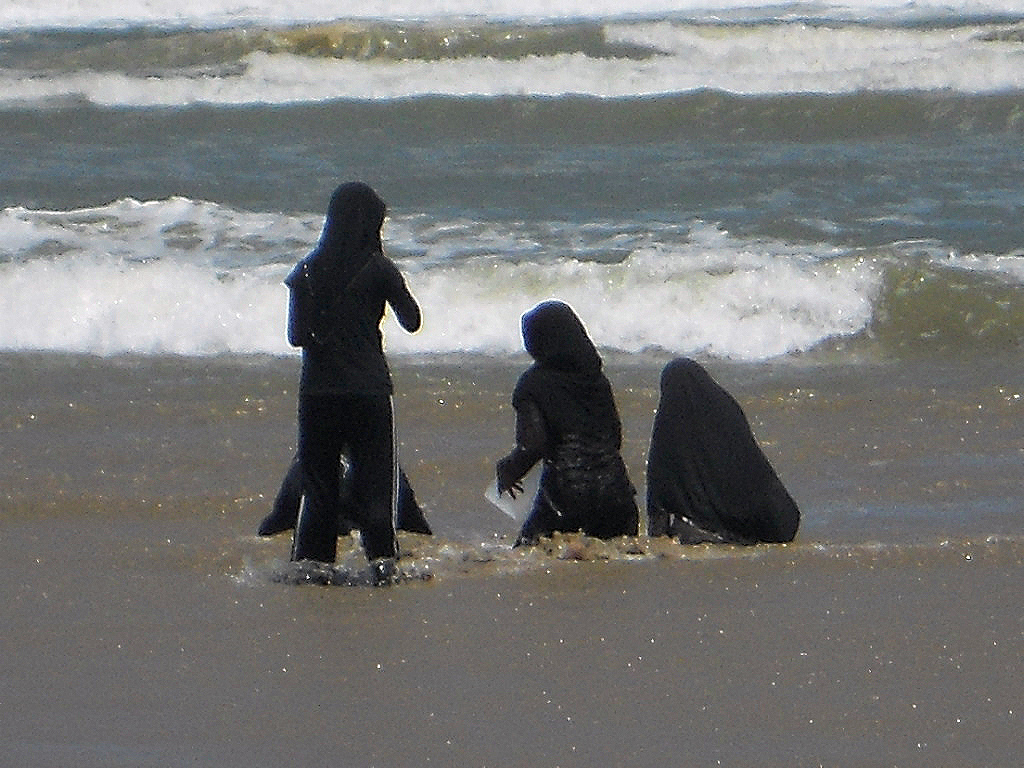
Burkini: Banned in French towns in 2016.

On 11 April 2011, French Prime Minister François Fillon banned face veils from being worn in public spaces in France other than Mosques, at home or when travelling as a passenger in a car.

In October 2017, France introduced an Anti-Terrorism Bill which authorised power for officials to search homes, restrict movement and close places of worship. The concept behind this bill has been commended by a United Nations human rights expert who also, on the contrary, highlights the negative influence this may have over religious freedom.

In May 2019, French senate (dominated by legislators of the political right) voted in favor of a law to extend civil servant limitations to wear religion signs to helpers attending school trips. This was immediately opposed by the government on the grounds that it would be 'criminal' to stigmatise a fraction of the national community.

=== Anti-discriminatory legislation ===
Discriminatory acts against religious groups in France are denounced by legislature which promote equality. Some legislation and political groups which address the issue of discrimination against religious freedom in France include:

- Declaration of the Rights of Man and of the Citizen
  "Article X – No one may be disturbed for his opinions, even religious ones, provided that their manifestation does not trouble the public order established by the law".
- The Preamble of the Constitution of 1946
  "France shall form with the peoples of her Overseas Territories a Union based upon equality of rights and privileges, without distinction as to race or religion".
- French Equal Opportunities and Anti-Discrimination Commission

== In the media ==
French media portrayals of Islam often depict mainstream anti-Islamic views.

"...negative outlook on Islam is covered by the French media — something both logical, and worrying. Logical, because the media have to report on actual incidences, and so they have an incentive to adopt a discourse that echoes what potential readers, TV viewers, and listeners find appealing. Worrying, because this tendency legitimizes negative stereotypes about Islam."

== In employment ==
There have been many reported cases of workplace Islamic discrimination against individuals. French law indicates two main guidelines regarding religion and employment. The "Protection of Individuals" indicates that one's religious beliefs must not disturb the functioning of the workplace, including views regarding hygiene and safety requirements. The "Proper functioning of the firm" highlights that religion must never interfere with performance or one's relationship with work. These French policies as seen as conflicting with some integrist views of Islam, claiming that it is dismissing their to practice the religion. For example, prayer breaks are disapproved.

== Islamophobic groups and notions ==
=== Great Replacement ===
The conspiracy theory term "Great Replacement" was created by Renaud Camus in 2011 identifying immigration policies as the main issue affecting the shift in the demographics of France.

== See also ==
- Freedom of religion in France
- Racism in France
- Islam in France
- Criticism of Islam
- Immigration to France
