= Dard =

Darad or Dard may refer to:

== Arts and entertainment ==
- Dard (1947 film), a Hindi film
- Dard (1981 film), a Hindi film
- Dard (2024 film), a Indo-Bangladesh joint production Pan-Indian film featuring Shakib Khan
- Dard Nordis, hero of the 1957 science fiction novel The Stars are Ours! by Andre Norton

== Organisations ==
- Department of Agriculture and Rural Development, a former government department in the Northern Ireland Executive
- Détachement d'Action Rapide et de Dissuasion, a Swiss counter-terrorism and police unit

== Other uses ==
- Dard people, an ethnic group mainly from Pakistan's Khyber Pakhtunkhwa, Gilgit-Baltistan, Kashmir and Afghanistan
  - Brokpa, Drokpa, Dard and Shin, a recognized Scheduled Tribe of India
- Dard (surname)
- Dard (river), a river of Jura, France
- Dard Hunter, born William Joseph Hunter (1883–1966), American authority on printing, paper, and papermaking

== See also ==
- Pointe du Dard, a mountain of Savoie, Franc
- Drad (disambiguation)
- Be Dardi, a 1993 Indian film
