= 2012 Alps killings =

2012 killings in the French Alps

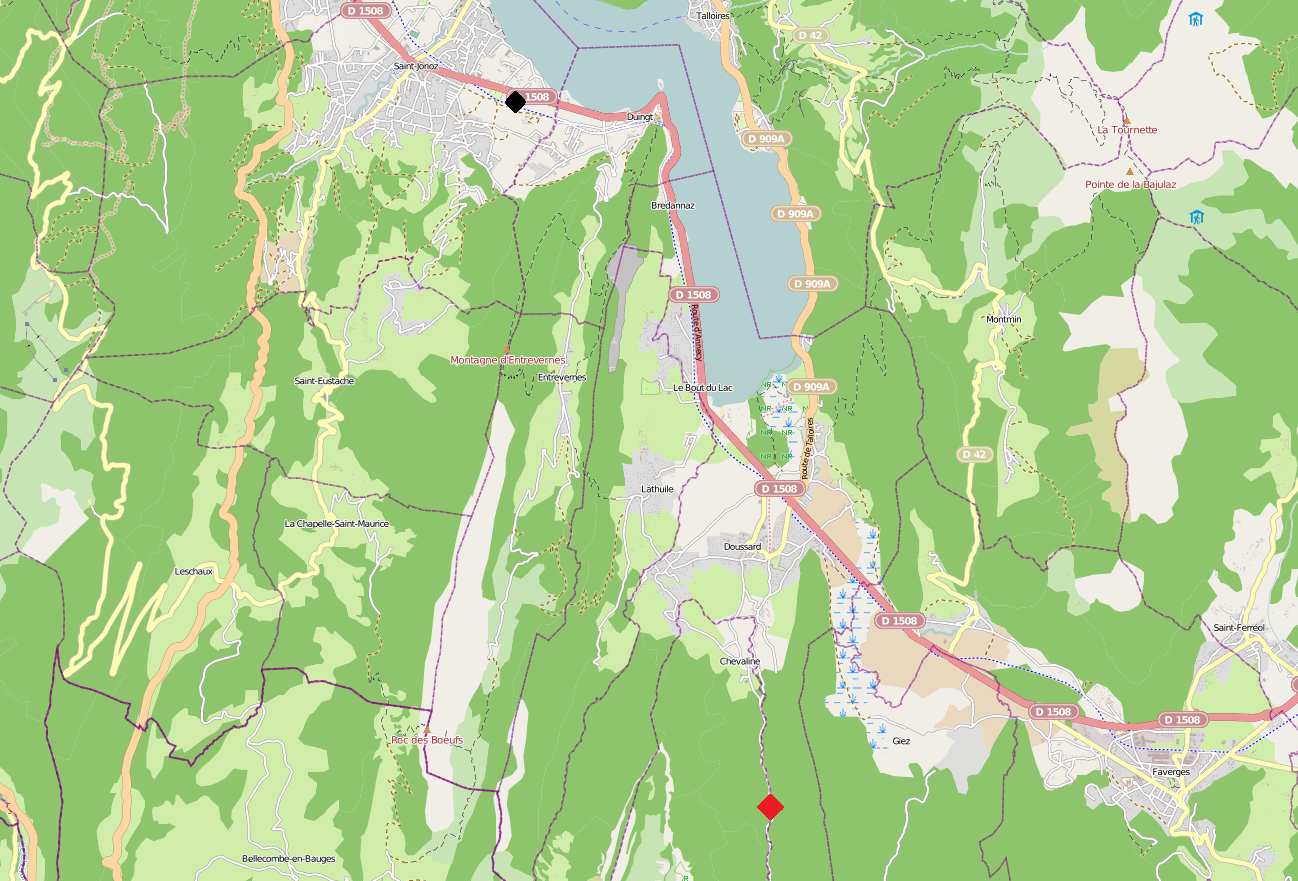
- Location of the family's campsite Location of the shootings
- Location: 45°43′46″N 06°13′28″E; Near Chevaline, Haute-Savoie, France
- Date: 5 September 2012 c.15:45 CEST (UTC+02:00)
- Attack type: Shooting
- Deaths: 4
- Injuries: 1
- Perpetrator: Unknown

The 2012 Alps killings, known in France as the Chevaline massacre (French: tuerie de Chevaline), were the deaths on 5 September 2012 of three members of a British-French family of Iraqi origin and a French citizen on the Route Forestière Domaniale de la Combe d'Ire near Chevaline, Haute-Savoie, France, near the southern end of Lake Annecy.

Four people were killed: an Iraqi-born British-French tourist named Saad al-Hilli, 50; his wife Iqbal, 47; her mother Suhaila al-Allaf, 74, who held a Swedish passport; and French cyclist Sylvain Mollier, 45. The al-Hillis' two daughters both survived the attack. One, aged 4, was hidden under the legs of her dead mother in the rear footwell for eight hours even while the Gendarmerie were on the scene; she was only discovered by specialist forensic investigators. The elder daughter, aged 7, was shot in the shoulder and also suffered a head wound; she returned to the United Kingdom on 14 September 2012.

Police investigated al-Hilli's past in Iraq as an engineer on sensitive topics, as well as his work at the time of his death, as a potential motive for the attack. The attack has been compared to the 1952 killing of biochemist Jack Drummond in the Dominici affair. In September 2017, after five years of investigation, French police said they had "no working theory" to explain the murders and no suspects. Veronique Dizot, the lead prosecutor, suggested that the family "may have been targeted randomly".

== Description of the attack ==
The attack took place in a lay-by on the mountain-side road at about 15:45 CEST on 5 September 2012. Twenty-five shots were fired in total. Initial reports stated only one semi-automatic pistol was fired, though it was later reported that full ballistics analysis was likely to disprove this. Eventually, ballistic analyses of the cartridge cases and butt plate fragments showed that the weapon used by the killer was a Luger P06 semi-automatic pistol (model 1906) firing the 7.65×21mm Parabellum ammunition with an eight-round magazine.

The bodies were discovered by Brett Martin, a British ex-RAF pilot, who is a resident in France, while he was out riding his bicycle. He did not hear the shots. This might be because the noise of flowing water masked the sound of gunfire as he was crossing a river bridge a few hundred metres from the murder location. Al-Hilli's eldest daughter, seven-year-old Zainab, was the first victim he saw when he arrived on the scene. She was stumbling into the road and collapsed in front of the British family's BMW car.

Prior to the incident, the BMW was reversed sharply into the side of the lay-by, leaving marks which were still visible when the site was reopened to the public. When Martin found the car, the engine was still running and the car was in reverse gear with the rear wheels spinning in the loose sand. The doors were locked. The deceased in the car were each shot twice in the head.

The French cyclist killed near the car was Sylvain Mollier. It has been reported that he was shot seven times.

== Police investigation ==
The investigation has been carried out by the section de recherches des Savoie (Criminal Investigation Department) of the National Gendarmerie, based in Chambéry, together with the Institut de recherche criminelle de la gendarmerie nationale of the National Gendarmerie, located near Paris. On 10 September, the Royal Logistic Corps bomb disposal unit were called to the home of al-Hilli in Claygate, Surrey after concerns were raised about items discovered during the police search, although the items under investigation were later described as "non-hazardous". The search did yield a Taser, an item that is illegal to possess in the UK.

In September 2012, in order to speed up the investigation, France and Britain agreed to create a joint Franco-British investigation team under Eurojust, which is rarely used in the UK.

A 54-year-old man was arrested on 24 June 2013 in Surrey in connection with the murders. Although unconfirmed by the police, some reports named the suspect as Zaid al-Hilli, the brother of Saad al-Hilli.

On 21 October 2013, BBC Panorama reported that a grey BMW X5 right hand drive 4×4 car was at the crime scene at the time of the murders, the driver of which may be a possible accomplice to the crime along with a motorcycle rider also spotted nearby. The motorcycle rider has been reported as having a goatee beard and an unusual helmet by French investigators.

Panorama also found that Zaid al-Hilli had tried to create a false will for his father and to withdraw £2m from his father's bank account at Crédit Agricole Geneva in Switzerland. Zaid al-Hilli claimed he was not guilty of the shootings and offered to take a lie detector test. In January 2014, it was announced that there was insufficient evidence to bring a charge against Zaid al-Hilli and his bail was lifted.

=== Al-Hilli leads ===
Police investigating the shootings have followed several leads relating to the activities of Saad al-Hilli. They have stated that he could have been targeted over a contract he was working on for EADS. Connections to al-Hilli's previous work at the Rutherford Appleton Laboratory had also been investigated. There were considerations as to whether there was a family financial feud that may have led to a contract killing.

In October 2012, Swiss prosecutors stated al-Hilli had visited a bank in Geneva shortly before he was murdered. A leaked report revealed that Saad al-Hilli may have had access to bank accounts belonging to Saddam Hussein.

=== Mollier lead ===
It had been suggested that the target of the murders may have been Sylvain Mollier, instead of the al-Hilli family. A police source stated that Mollier, a local father of three who worked as a welder in a workshop at a subsidiary of Areva, "doesn't appear to have been exposed to nuclear secrets".

=== "Lone psychopath" theory ===
In October 2012, confidential police files on the case were leaked to a French newspaper, showing investigators believed the killings were carried out by "a lone and psychologically disturbed killer". One of the reasons given was that the killer used a pre-World War II Luger P06 semi-automatic pistol, a weapon unlikely to be used by a professional assassin.

=== Arrest of local ex-policeman ===
On 18 February 2014, a former policeman was arrested following the issue of an artist's impression of a man in a motorcycle helmet. Police removed several guns from his home. The man, living in the local village of Lathuile, and said to be a weapons collector, reportedly had been dismissed from the municipal police in June 2013. It is not clear whether the investigators thought he could be involved in the killings. It was later shown that the policeman's DNA did not match the two samples found in the vehicle of the victims.

=== Missing motorcyclist ===
In 2015, the motorcyclist spotted nearby the incident, and sought by the police, was traced and ruled out of the inquiry as an innocent passer-by.

=== French Foreign Legionnaire ===
Since his suicide in June 2014, Patrice Menegaldo, an ex-French Foreign Legion soldier from Ugine, has been positioned very high on the list of suspects. According to Éric Maillaud, the state prosecutor: "The hypothesis at the top of the chain for the investigators is a local killing. We have a real suspect. I am referring to the Legionnaire from Ugine." Menegaldo had for seven years had an affair with Mollier's sister and knew Mollier's partner, Claire Schutz. Police assume that Menegaldo committed suicide because he thought of himself as being a suspect, even though police admitted not to have had him as a primary suspect when they spoke to him in April 2014.

=== Nordahl Lelandais hypothesis ===
Police are looking into whether a suspected serial killer could be behind the unsolved Alps murders. Nordahl Lelandais, a 34-year-old ex-soldier, is the main suspect in two other cases in the area.

One relates to the disappearance and death of an eight-year-old girl, Maëlys de Araujo, in August 2017 at a wedding where the suspect was a guest; the other to the killing of a hitchhiking soldier in April of the same year.

Lelandais has been in custody since September 2017, as part of the investigation of the disappearance and death of the de Araujo child in the Chambéry region of south-eastern France. He has been charged with kidnapping and murder of the girl.

Prosecutors also charged Lelandais with the killing of Arthur Noyer, a 24-year-old soldier, who vanished after hitchhiking from a disco in Chambéry on 12 April 2017. Investigators probing the de Araujo case found that Lelandais' cell phone had been in the same area at the same time as Arthur Noyer. Chambéry prosecutor Thierry Dran told a news conference that Lelandais' black Audi A3 car was identified in the area on surveillance cameras, and an analysis of his phone found he had looked up "decomposition of a human body" on the internet.

"We are going to look at all the disturbing disappearances which have taken place in this region," Dran told reporters. When asked about the Annecy shootings, Dran told Le Parisien: "Given this new development, we will be verifying (any connections), and that will naturally be done, to rule out or include (the suspect in the investigation). It would be wrong not to."

In 2020, investigators received a judicial expertise report authored by a British forensic psychiatrist, which provided a psychological profile of the gunman. The report described the individual as likely being between 30 and 40 years old, unemployed or employed in a low-paying job, living alone, accustomed to failure, and possessing a prior criminal record.

Furthermore, the expert theorized that the suspect may have exhibited signs of a personality disorder from a young age, and could have been subjected to childhood abuse or suffered a head injury during early development. The report claims the attacker was an arms collector and kept the pistol used in the shooting before attempting to fix it, and gives a 50% chance that he previously served in the military.

=== January 2022 arrest ===
On 12 January 2022 a man was arrested in connection with the murders. Along with the arrest, house searches were also conducted and detectives were re-examining the alibis of the suspect. However, he was released after prosecutors said the man had been ruled out as the killer.

=== New survivor testimony ===
In June 2013, investigators gave the daughters a notebook to note any potential flashbacks to the scene they would have had. A few days after the murder, Zainab told investigators that she remembered pacing back and forth around the family's car while her parents were yelling at her to get back inside the car, this was before she lost consciousness and woke up in a hospital bed.

On 1 April 2020, Zainab reported to her aunt a flashback in which she recalled being grabbed by a man of average build with bitten fingernails. In June 2021, she provided a more detailed account to investigators, stating that she remembered her parents shouting at her to get back into the car before she was thrown and seized by a fair-skinned man dressed in leather pants and a leather blouson. She recalled being shot in the shoulder and then repeatedly struck with a pistol's stock in the back of the head, after which she lost consciousness.

Also in 2021, Zina hesitantly described the attacker to investigators as a bald, fair-skinned European male between the ages of 45 and 55, with "badly-shaven" facial hair, blue eyes, and grey hairs on his "round" face. She claimed that he could have been wearing dark jeans and a leather jacket. She stated that she could have seen the man while looking out of the car's window, but that she remained uncertain.

== Developments since 2022 ==
In September 2022, the case was transferred to the national cold case unit in Nanterre under investigating magistrate Sabine Khéris. The renewed inquiry confirmed the murder weapon as a Swiss-made Luger P06/29 7.65mm Parabellum pistol, which was manufactured in 1935 as part of a 940-unit production run. The weapon has yet to be recovered, but ballistic analysis has helped significantly narrow the search for the murder weapon and remains the primary focus of the inquiry.

The cold case unit confirmed that a Luger pistol was found in a nearby lake in August 2026, but determining if it is the murder weapon will require significant forensic analysis due to the water damage.

=== Ballistic analysis and profiling ===
In 2023, judicial military and firearms experts in the French Army concluded that the killer likely had specialized military training, citing the use of close-range headshots to the victims, including shots fired from inside the vehicle, as evidence of advanced skill and composure under stress.

The judicial expertise noted that the outdated and traceable pistol was considered inconsistent with a professional contract killing, and the random presence of the victims further supported the theory of a lone, trained perpetrator. This led the cold case unit to completely rule out a contract killing as a lead.

Investigators also noted the use of plunging fire techniques involving downward, close-quarters headshots was not typically taught in standard military training in France but reportedly used by elite units and intelligence services such as the DGSE, certain branches of the DGSI, and the 1st Marine Infantry Parachute Regiment (1er RPIMa). Similar instruction has been linked to Swiss special forces, particularly the Détachement d'Action Rapide et de Dissuasion in the nearby Swiss canton of Vaud, and private tactical schools in Switzerland, one of which offered a course informally known as the "assassin course".

Based on these factors, the judicial expertise report proposed that the likely perpetrator was a Swiss national in his fifties with prior experience in advanced military or paramilitary training who may have later experienced psychological destabilization. The report concluded that none of the victims were targeted, and that they were at the wrong place and at the wrong time.

In May 2024, the Nanterre cold case unit ordered new DNA analysis on pieces from the butt of the weapon found at the scene. In October 2024, the new investigating magistrate ordered new crime scene reenactments along with the Gendarmerie's Chambéry research section. The reconstruction concluded that the gunman emptied two chargers before his pistol jammed and he began repeatedly to pistol-whip Zainab.

=== Murder of Xavier Baligant and linked leads ===
The Nanterre unit explored possible links between the killings and the unsolved 2011 murder of Xavier Baligant, a 29-year-old Belgian man who was shot and killed at a rest stop near Malvaux in Meurthe-et-Moselle. Baligant had stopped briefly along the A31 motorway during a return trip from vacation, accompanied by his two sleeping children. He was shot five times, including a final plunging fire headshot, similar in execution as the Chevaline case. The crime scene yielded no useful surveillance footage or eyewitness accounts.

Ballistic analysis determined that Baligant was killed with a Schmidt-Rubin K31 rifle, a Swiss military weapon from the 1950s, similar in rarity and origin to the Swiss Luger pistol used in the Chevaline case. Investigators noted additional similarities between the two cases, including the remote locations of the murders, the lack of clear motive, and the use of precise, collector-grade firearms. A software comparison of both case files led authorities to identify a Belgian weapons collector linked to both types of firearms, he was interviewed and cleared of involvement.

Investigators also focused on a Danish man, Bjarne N., who had camped near both crime scenes shortly before each murder. According to cell phone records, he reportedly stayed at a campsite in Villey-le-Sec, approximately 20 km from the Malvaux rest area, on the night Baligant was killed. He later arrived at Camping Europa in Saint-Jorioz near Lake Annecy on 3 September 2012 and left on 5 September, the day of the Chevaline attack.

Some investigators continue to believe that the main target of the attack may have been Sylvain Mollier. RTL noted that Mollier's presence on the forest road was unplanned, suggesting that the shooter may have been waiting in ambush, hidden in the surrounding vegetation. An inquiry into Mollier's background did not yield any relevant breakthrough in the case. A DNA and fingerprint comparison request was submitted to Austrian authorities after a possible match with an Austrian citizen, which has yet to yield any significant result.

== Reactions ==
British Prime Minister David Cameron said: "Obviously the faster we can get to the bottom of what happened, the better." He also said, "I have spoken to the British ambassador in France and consular staff are working very hard so that we do everything we can ... and to find out what happened in this very tragic case."

French President François Hollande said "I expressed my emotion earlier today to the British people in relation to the terrible deaths. Both the French and the British family have been impacted by this terrible event and we will do our utmost to find the perpetrators, to find the reasons behind that event. Our police are co-operating and everything that is found will be shared."

In June 2022 Channel 4 broadcast a three-part series Murder in the Alps, examining the events and police investigation.

== Bibliography ==
- Tom Parry (2015): The Perfect Crime. Mirror Books. ISBN 978-1907324598

== See also ==
- Crime in France
- List of unsolved deaths
- Evidence Locker Podcast: 54. France - The Chevaline Killings
