= Chevaline (disambiguation) =

Chevaline may refer to:

- The Chevaline project, a former secret project to upgrade the British Polaris missile system
- Chevaline, a commune of the Haute-Savoie département, in France
- The Roan Antelope, known in French as Antilope Chevaline
- Chevaline is another name for horse meat for human consumption.
