= Al-Hilli =

Al-Hilli (Arabic: الحلي) is an Arabic surname. Notable people with the surname include:

- al-Allama al-Hilli (1250–1325), theologian
- Safi al-Din al-Hilli (1278–1349), poet
- al-Hilli family, victims of the Annecy shootings of 2012
