= Nordahl Lelandais =

French criminal (b. 1983)

Nordahl Guillaume Richard Lelandais (born February 18, 1983, in Boulogne-Billancourt) is a French murderer and alleged serial killer and rapist.

In 2022 and 2021 respectively, Lelandais was sentenced for the murders of Maëlys de Araujo and Arthur Noyer in 2017. He is suspected to be the perpetrator in a number of other murder cases in France, among them Jean-Christophe Morin and Ahmed Hamadou, who disappeared in 2011 and 2012 from an electronic music festival at Fort de Tamié near Albertville and the Annecy shootings, in which four people were killed in the French alps.

At some point before February 26, 2025, Lelandais changed his family name to his mother's maiden name, Périnet.

== Life ==
Nordahl Lelandais was born on February 18, 1983, in Boulogne-Billancourt (Hauts-de-Seine). After failing his baccalaureate, he joined the French army and stayed in service from 2001 to 2005, working as a dog handler. He was discharged due to psychological problems.

== Criminal acts ==
In 2009, Lelandais was given a suspended prison sentence for setting a fire in a bar in Paladru.

Lelandais was arrested in the summer of 2017 as the prime suspect in the murder of Maëlys de Araujo. The girl had disappeared during a wedding party in Le Pont-de-Beauvoisin, Isère on August 27. Lelandais was convicted using CCTV footage and mobile phone data. He has been serving a life sentence since 2022.

In 2018, he became the prime suspect in the disappearance of Arthur Noyer, a 23-year-old soldier who disappeared when hitchhiking in France in 2017. Lelandais confessed later the same year after first only admitting that he had picked him up hitchhiking.

During the investigation in the Maëlys case, police discovered that Lelandais had used child pornography and he has been suspected to have abused several underage girls in his family and circle of friends.

On March 26, 2025, Lelandais was sentenced to a year in prison for a sexual assault on a minor second cousin in 2017.
