= France and the Russo-Ukrainian war =

President Emmanuel Macron with Ukraine President Volodymyr Zelenskyy, January 2026

France has supported Ukraine during the ongoing Russian invasion of Ukraine, during Presidency of Emmanuel Macron. After it began on 24 February 2022, then incumbent Renaissance President Emmanuel Macron condemned the invasion, provided military and humanitarian aid to Ukraine, and sanctioned Russia and Belarus, the two countries most involved in invading Ukraine.

== History ==
Emmanuel Macron and Zelenskyy during the former's visit to Ukraine sixteen days before the invasion, 8 February 2022

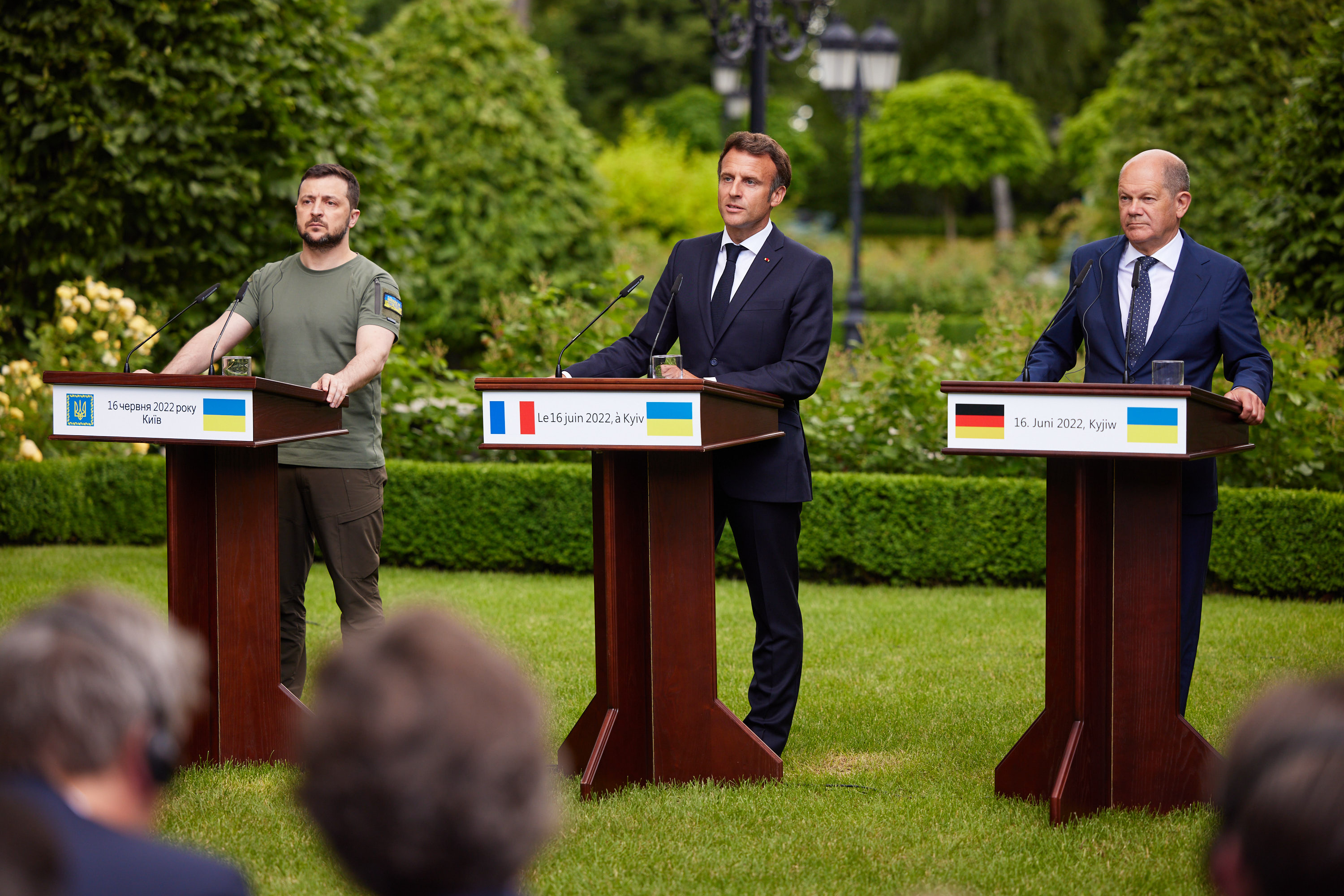
Macron, Ukrainian President Volodymyr Zelenskyy and German Chancellor Olaf Scholz in Kyiv in 2022

In January 2022 during the Russo-Ukrainian crisis the Minister for Foreign Affairs of Ukraine Dmytro Kuleba had a telephone conversation with the Minister for Foreign Affairs of France Jean-Yves Le Drian. Dmytro Kuleba informed his interlocutor in detail about the latest actions of the Russian Federation aimed at destabilizing the security situation in the temporarily occupied territories of Ukraine. The Minister drew attention to the threatening withdrawal of Russian troops to the border of our state and the intensification of Russian propaganda that threatens Ukraine with war. He assured that Ukraine does not seek war and remains committed to a political and diplomatic settlement of the Russo-Ukrainian war. Jean-Yves Le Drian noted that France, like Ukraine, is anxiously monitoring the withdrawal of Russian troops to the borders of our country and the temporarily occupied territories. He assured of France's continued support for Ukraine's sovereignty and territorial integrity. The head of French diplomacy especially noted Ukraine's prudent and wise actions in the current situation.

On 20 February 2022, French President Emmanuel Macron and Russian President Vladimir Putin agreed to work toward a ceasefire in eastern Ukraine. The two leaders also agreed on "the importance of favouring a diplomatic solution to the present crisis and doing all possible to achieve one," according to the Élysée, with French Foreign Minister Jean-Yves Le Drian and his Russian counterpart Sergey Lavrov meeting "in the coming days." On 21 February 2022, hours after Russia's diplomatic recognition of two self-proclaimed republics in Donbas, the French president Emmanuel Macron who proposed a summit between Biden and Putin in the light of the 2021–2022 Russo-Ukrainian crisis, condemned the recognition and demanded sanctions.

During the prelude to the 2022 Russian invasion of Ukraine, Macron spoke face-to-face and on the phone to Russian President Vladimir Putin. During Macron's campaign for the re-election, nearly two months after the Russian invasion began, Macron called on European leaders to maintain dialogue with Putin.

After the 2022 Russian invasion of Ukraine started, France, as one of the EU countries, imposed sanctions on Russia, and Russia added all EU countries to the list of "unfriendly nations". On 5 June 2022, French finance minister Bruno Le Maire stated that France is currently in talks with the United Arab Emirates, intending to replace Russian oil imports due to the imposition of the European Union ban.

On 16 June 2022, French President Emmanuel Macron visited Ukraine alongside German Chancellor Olaf Scholz and Italy's Prime Minister Mario Draghi. He met with Ukraine's President Volodymyr Zelenskyy and expressed "European Unity" for Ukraine. He said that the nations that remained neutral in the Russo-Ukrainian War made a historic mistake and were complicit in the new imperialism. Since Macron took power in France, Russian-French relations have remained at a standstill. According to Macron, "the war will continue" and he urged the French people "to prepare for the scenario where we all have to go without Russian gas." Macron's government has urged a "sobriety plan" to conserve energy rather than seek better diplomatic relations with the Russian Federation.

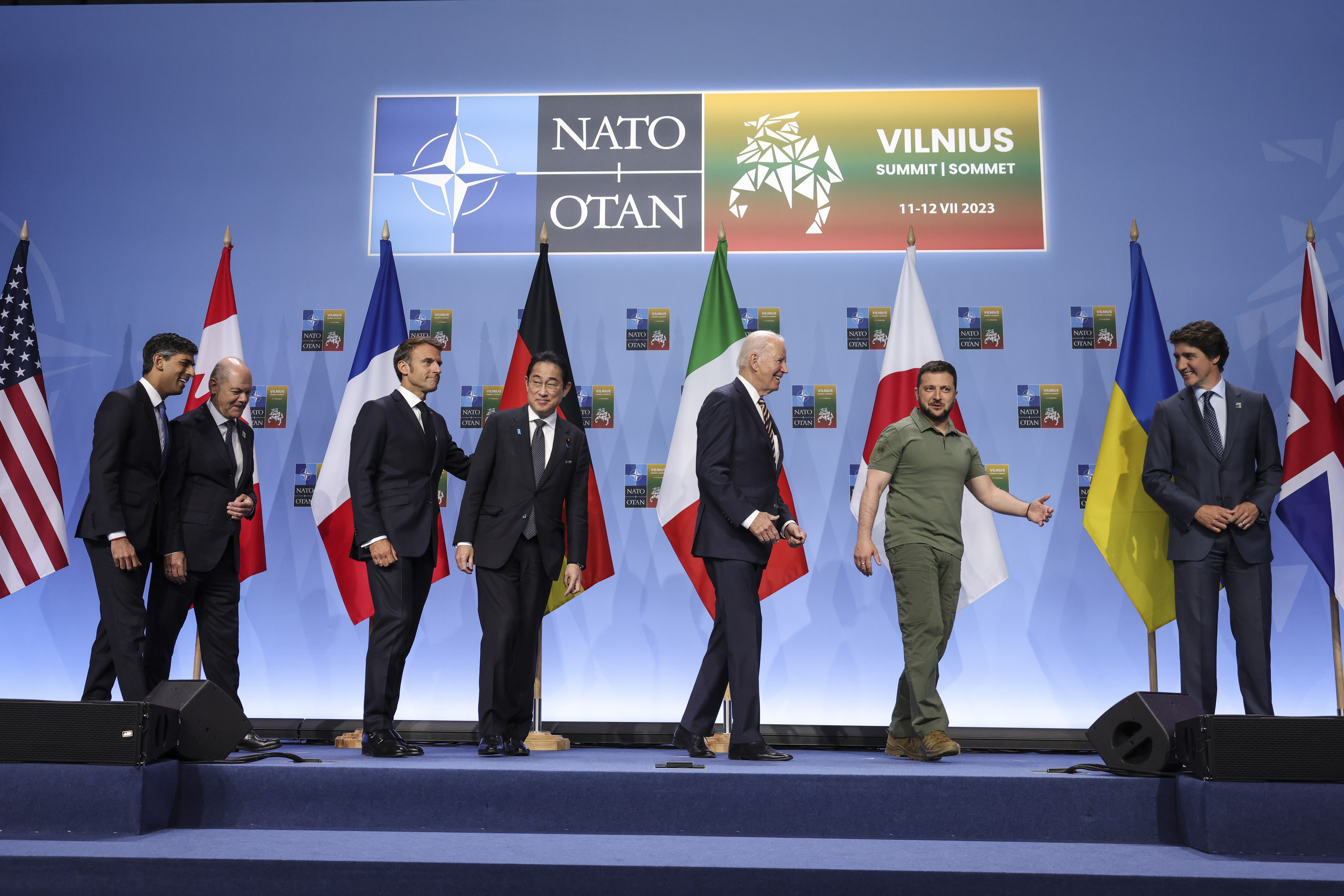
Macron at the NATO Summit in Vilnius on 12 July 2023

On 31 May 2023 Macron visited the GLOBSEC forum in Bratislava, where he again delivered a speech on European sovereignty. During the question and answer session that followed the Bratislava speech, he said that negotiating with Putin may have to take priority over any war crimes tribunal which some others, including Zelenskyy, wish to see.

On 12 June 2023, Macron promised to deliver more ammunition, weapons and armed vehicles to help Ukrainian forces with the ongoing counter-offensive to liberate Russian-occupied southeastern Ukraine. At the NATO Summit in Vilnius, he promised to supply Ukraine with Scalp long-range cruise missiles to hit Russian targets deep behind the front lines. On 10 November 2023, he said that what Russia is doing in Ukraine is "imperialism and colonialism" and it was the "duty" of France and other countries to help Ukraine defend itself, but added that maybe the time will come to hold fair peace negotiations and find a solution with Russia.

In January 2024, Russia summoned the French ambassador to the Foreign Ministry over allegations that French mercenaries have been fighting on Ukraine's side against Russia's invasion.

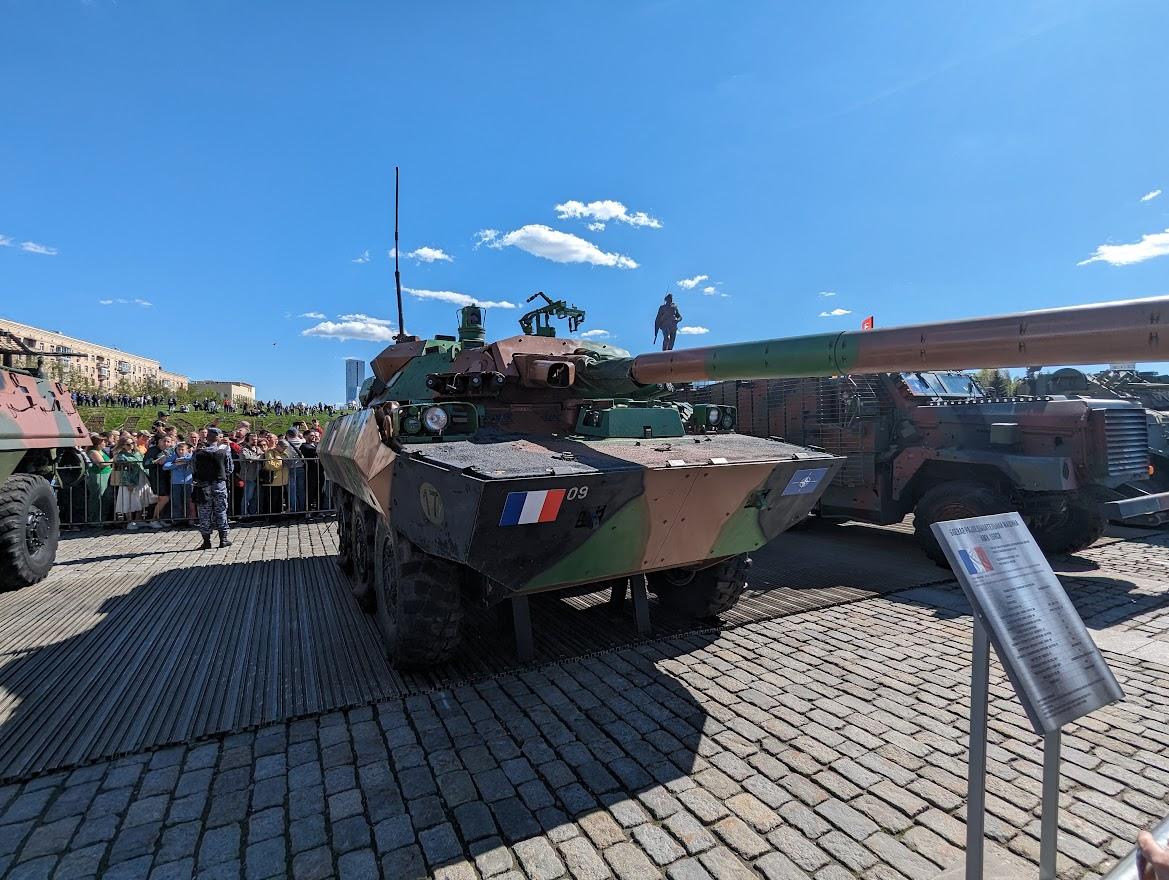
Captured AMX-10 RC in Ukrainian service on public display in Moscow, 7 May 2024

In February 2024, during a meeting with other European states, Macron generated controversy by suggesting sending ground troops to Ukraine. On 28 May 2024, Macron gave Ukraine permission to use SCALP EG missiles against targets on Russian soil. Such usage was instructed to be limited "to neutralize military sites from which missiles are being fired, military sites from which Ukraine is being attacked".

In October 2024, France supported President Zelenskyy's Victory Plan for Ukraine.

On 24 February 2025, during a meeting with US President Donald Trump, Macron said that a truce between Ukraine and Russia could be agreed in the coming weeks.

After a heated meeting between US President Trump and President Zelenskyy at the White House, President Emmanuel Macron called Russia an "aggressor" and Ukraine an "assaulted people" and said that France and its allies were "right to help Ukraine and sanction Russia three years ago and to continue doing so". He made a particular nod to Trump's comment during the meeting: "If anyone is gambling with World War III, his name is Vladimir Putin."

France's anti-disinformation watchdog, Viginum, has been principally focused on countering Russian disinformation since the start of the war.

=== Zelenskyy visits to France ===
Emmanuel Macron meets President of Ukraine Volodymyr Zelenskyy.

Leaving Germany on the night of 14 May, Zelenskyy departed on a French government jet and landed in Paris. Zelenskyy met with President Emmanuel Macron at the Élysée Palace over a three-hour dinner, with one-hour just between the two leaders. Macron made assurances of more deliveries to Ukraine of air defense systems, tanks, and armored vehicles, including French AMX-10 RCs, to be announced in the following weeks.

== Aid to Ukraine ==
France has provided humanitarian aid, notably through the French Foreign Ministry's Crisis and Support Center as well as the EU Civil Protection Mechanism. It includes:

- 33 t (32 long tons; 36 short tons) of emergency equipment (500 family tents, 2300 blankets, 1000 hygiene kits, 2000 floor mats, 300 sleeping bags) delivered on 1 March 2022.
- 37 t (36 long tons; 41 short tons) of humanitarian aid (500 tents, 1500 beds, 1500 sleeping bags, 25 large tents) delivered to Moldova to take in refugees fleeing the Russian invasion of Ukraine on 2 March 2022.
- 8 t (7.9 long tons; 8.8 short tons) of medical supplies (1 mobile clinic composed of medicines and medical equipment, 36 containers of medication) delivered by 2 airplanes through Poland on 2 March 2022.
- 4.23 t (4.16 long tons; 4.66 short tons) of medical equipment (batch of medicines, personal protective equipment, 27 respirators and associated equipment) delivered on 5 March 2022.
- 3.4 t (3.3 long tons; 3.7 short tons) of medicines delivered on 7 March 2022.
- 7.4 t (7.3 long tons; 8.2 short tons) of medicines delivered on 10 March 2022.
- 9 t (8.9 long tons; 9.9 short tons) of emergency equipment (10,000 hygiene kits, 17 large-capacity generators) delivered to Moldova to take in refugees on 17 March 2022.
- 55 t (54 long tons; 61 short tons) of emergency aid (10 oxygen generators, 9 tons of medicines, 31 generators including 6 high-capacity generator, 9 family tents to the Polish Red Cross, 8 tons of IT equipment, 4 tons of baby milk) delivered on 21 March 2022.
- 21 new ambulances, 11 fire engines, 16 personal rescue vehicles and 49 tons of medical and emergency equipment (protective equipment, hand ladders, fire hoses...) dispatched by a convoy of 23 trucks and 100 firefighters and rescuers through Romania on 23 March 2022.
- 2 blood collection lorries donated by the French blood agency delivered on 17 March 2022 and 25 March 2022.
- Dispatch of a unit of 16 gendarmes and 2 forensic experts from the IRCGN with projectable genetic testing system to investigate and capture evidence of alleged war crimes in Ukraine by invading Russian forces since 11 April 2022.
- 12 fire engines, 12 rescue vehicles and 50 tons of emergency equipment for search and rescue and firefighting delivered on 15 April 2022.
- 28 t (28 long tons; 31 short tons) of medical equipment (1 oxygen generator, 50 sets of respiratory equipment, a second batch of respiratory equipment, 4.5 tons of medicines, a second batch of emergency medicines, 1 high capacity generator) delivered on 21 April 2022.
- 6 new or recent firefighting vehicles, 6 new fire brigade ambulances, 1 medical vehicle equipped with a mobile radiology unit, 115 tons of equipment (including 36 km of fire hoses and 56,000 litres of foam) and 20,160 food rations delivered on 10 May 2022.
- 800 t (790 long tons; 880 short tons) of humanitarian aid have been given as of 17 May 2022.
- 12,000 IT equipment (4G routers, IP phones, desktop and laptop computers, servers, network and wifi equipment) delivered through Poland on 25 May 2022.
- 600 t (590 long tons; 660 short tons) of potato plants donated by producers from the French Federation of Seed Potato Growers shipped and distributed directly to Ukrainian farmers between April and May 2022.
- Evacuation and medical treatment of wounded Ukrainian soldiers. At least 3 operations were carried out (on 20 May 2022, 16 June 2022 and 17 June 2022) to evacuate 13 Ukrainian war wounded.
- 1 mobile health post (equipped with medical supplies and medicines) and medical equipment used for anaesthesia and resuscitation delivered on 28 June 2022.
- 2 mobile DNA analysis laboratory to help investigate Russian war crimes.
- 10,000 laptops for Ukrainians doctors provided on 26 July 2022.
- Help in mine clearance with the involvement of French specialists and equipment, training of Ukrainian to mine clearance of body water reported after a conference between the head of Chernihiv Oblast Military Administration Viacheslav and representatives of the French Embassy in Ukraine on 16 August 2022.
- Dispatch of a new team of experts from the National Gendarmerie Criminal Research Institute (IRCGN) to investigate Russian war crimes in Izium on 27 September 2022.
- 1,000 t (980 long tons; 1,100 short tons) of humanitarian goods (15 fire and rescue vehicles, 8 motorized semi-rigid watercraft, 19 tons of rescue, clearing and protective equipment, 25 tons of emergency medicine, 1 medical vehicle equipped with a mobile radiology device for carrying out examinations in the field, 60,000 food rations, 48 tons of prepared meals, 13 tons of milk, 5 generators, building materials, tarpaulins, 200 meters of emergency bridges including 3 prefabricated "Bailey" type bridges purchased from Cerema and 3 modular metal bridges purchased from the French company Matière) delivered on 28 September 2022.
- 100 50-100 KWA generators delivered on 23 November 2022.
- Two pilot ships to aid in the export of Ukrainian grain.
- 28 generators donated to three hospitals in Chernihiv Oblast.
- €5.71 million contribution to the Ukraine Energy Support Fund.
- €60 million in support pledged to the Ukrainian energy sector 23 September 2024.
- €10.6 million to the EBRD Chornobyl Fund to help repair the New safe confinement damaged by the Russian invasion.
- €200 million to support projects for reconstruction and European market integration announced June 2025.
- €70 million for the Ukrainian Critical Infrastructure Support Fund February 2026.
- Six THeMIS ground drones modified for demining and donated to the Ukrainian Emergency Service.
- 40 COLOSSUS firefighting robots purchased for the Ukrainian Emergency Service.
- 68 106 kW solar power generators for critical infrastructure donated to Kyiv Oblast.
- Six laparoscopic stands for Ukrainian children's hospitals.
- €71 million in grant financial support pledged February 2026.
- Eight 112kW generators donated by Paris City Hall.

== See also ==
- United States and the Russo-Ukrainian war
