= Murder of Maëlys de Araujo =

2017 child murder in France

Maëlys de Araujo
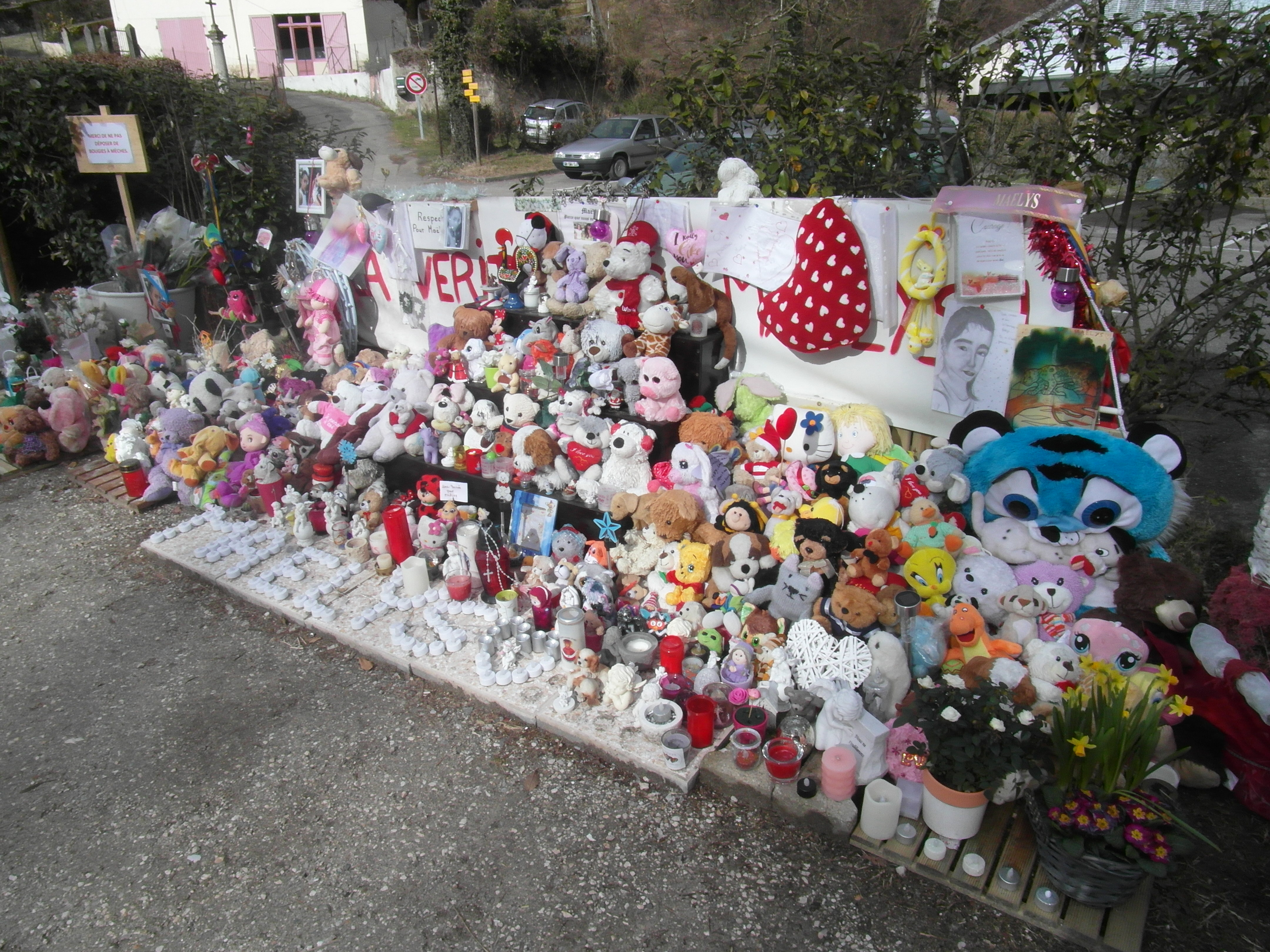
- Commemoration scene dedicated to De Araujo in Le Pont-de-Beauvoisin in March 2018
- Born: 5 November 2008; France
- Disappeared: 27 August 2017 (aged 8); Le Pont-de-Beauvoisin, Isère, France
- Status: Found dead 14 February 2018
- Cause of death: Homicide
- Body discovered: Attignat-Oncin

Maëlys de Araujo (5 November 2008 – 27 August 2017) was a French child who was last seen alive in the early morning of 27 August 2017 at a wedding in the Chambéry region of south-eastern France. Her remains were found on 14 February 2018 when Nordahl Lelandais, who admitted to killing her, led investigators to the area where he had disposed of the body. On 17 February 2022, Lelandais was sentenced to life imprisonment for the kidnapping and murder of De Araujo.

== Investigation ==
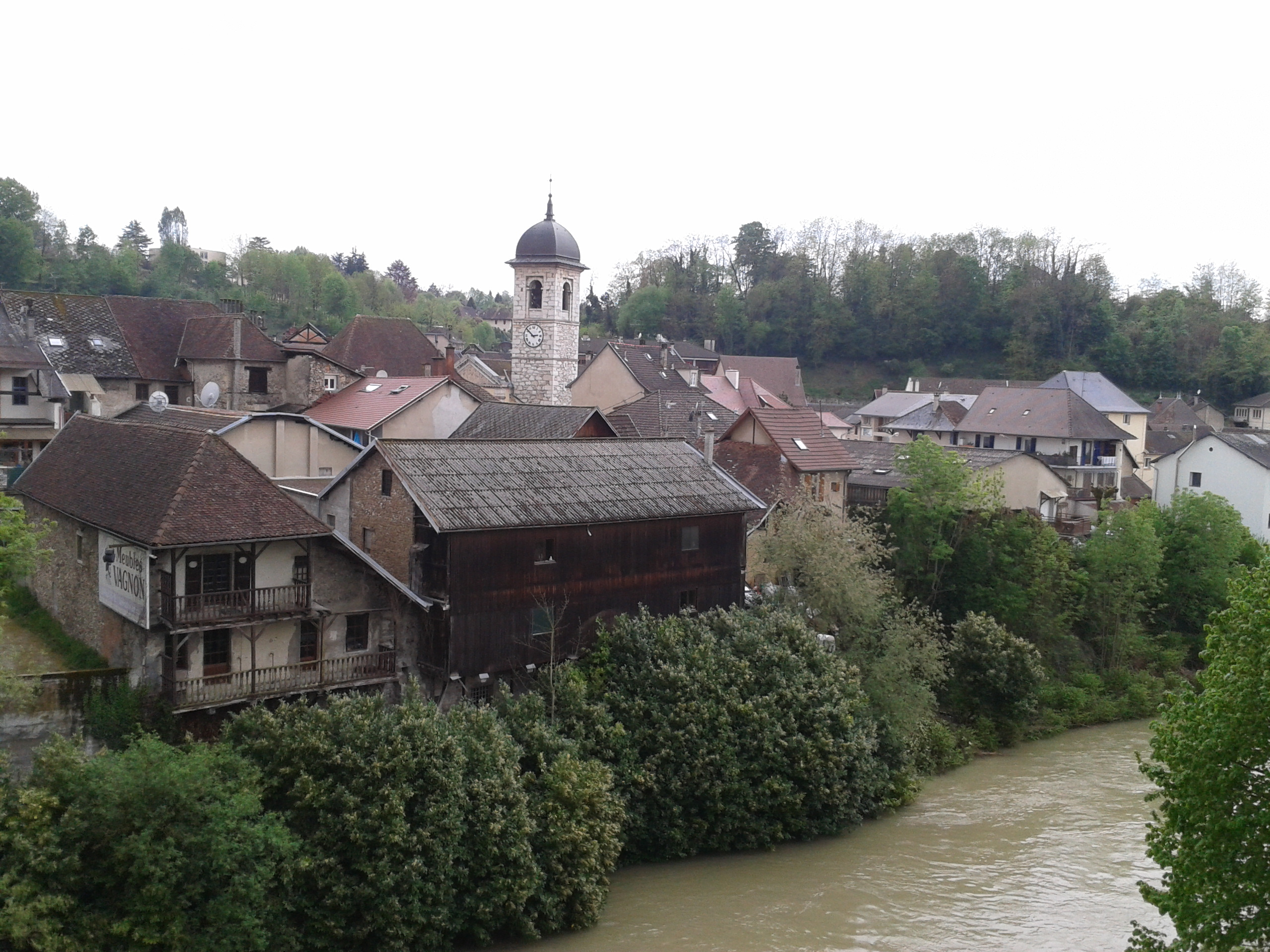
Le Pont-de-Beauvoisin, Isère, the town where Maëlys de Araujo disappeared

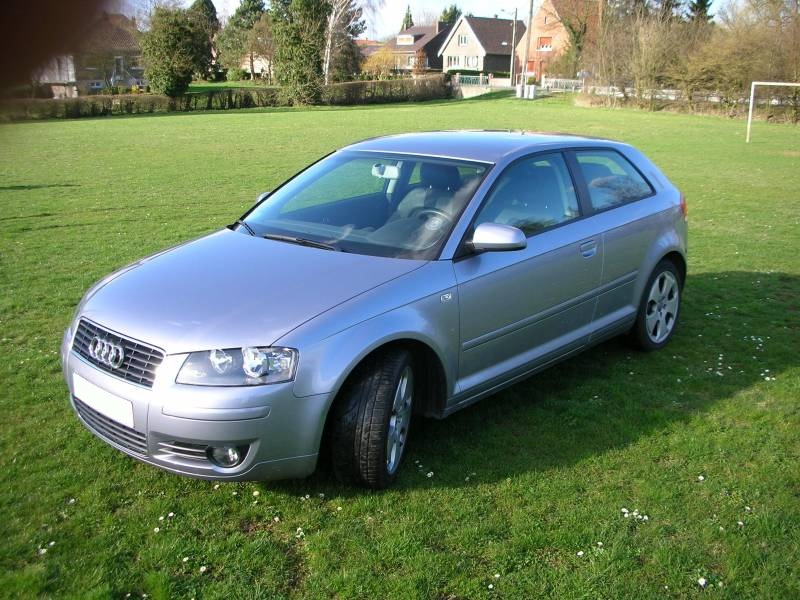
An Audi A3, like the one owned by Nordahl Lelandais

Maëlys de Araujo was last seen at a wedding in Le Pont-de-Beauvoisin, Isère at approximately 3:00 am on 27 August 2017. After a DJ working at the wedding announced that she was missing, guests immediately started looking for her, and after an hour of searching, a police report was filed. In the months that followed, police interviewed 180 wedding guests. Along with local volunteers, they also searched the dense woodland around the area.

Nordahl Lelandais, an ex-soldier who attended the wedding, was taken into custody in September 2017 after traces of De Araujo's DNA were found in his Audi A3 car. Two police dogs fell seriously ill after searching the car. Lelandais had reportedly used a strong detergent to clean it a few hours after De Araujo disappeared. A car wash CCTV camera recorded him cleaning the car for more than two hours. CCTV footage showed Lelandais leaving the wedding venue with a "small, frail figure in a white dress" in the passenger seat of his car shortly before De Araujo was reported missing. Lelandais' mobile phone was in airplane mode around this time, and then reconnected after 39 minutes, when he returned to the wedding alone.

On 14 February 2018, Lelandais admitted to killing De Araujo, and led the police to where he had hidden her body. He told prosecutors he had killed her "involuntarily" but refused to elaborate further. The post-mortem established that De Araujo had suffered a fractured jaw, possibly from a violent blow to the face. Lelandais was held in custody in a psychiatric unit in a prison in Bron, just outside Lyon.

According to a witness from the wedding, Lelandais had been invited as a guest, first only to the reception, then to the party that took place later in the evening. Known as being a part of the local drug scene, Lelandais was asked by another wedding guest to bring cocaine, which he did. He arrived shortly after midnight.

On 17 February 2022, his 39th birthday, Lelandais was sentenced to life imprisonment with a minimum term of 22 years for the kidnapping and murder of De Araujo.

== Link to other cases ==
Prosecutors investigating De Araujo's death suspected that Lelandais is a serial killer. On 21 December 2017, he was charged with the killing of Arthur Noyer, a 23-year-old soldier who vanished after hitchhiking from a disco in Chambéry on 12 April 2017. Investigators found that Lelandais's mobile phone had been in the same area at the same time as Noyer's. Lelandais's Audi A3 car was identified in the area on surveillance cameras. An analysis of his computer found he had searched for "decomposition of a human body" on the internet two weeks after Noyer disappeared. Lelandais admitted having given Noyer a lift but first denied any involvement in his death, before eventually admitting the killing on 29 March 2018. Other cases that may be linked to Lelandais include those of Jean-Christophe Morin and Ahmed Hamadou, who vanished from a festival in Fort de Tamié in 2011 and 2012 respectively.

== See also ==
- Annecy shootings
- Disappearance of Madeleine McCann
- List of solved missing person cases (2010s)
- Michel Fourniret
