= Disappearance of Jean-Christophe Morin =

Unsolved 2011 disappearance in Albertville

Jean-Christophe Morin
- Born: 1988 or 1989; France
- Disappeared: 10 September 2011 (aged 23) near Albertville

Jean-Christophe Morin (born 1988 or 1989) is a French man who disappeared on 10 September 2011 at the age of 23 after attending an electronic music festival at Fort de Tamié near Albertville.

The case gained publicity due to the family's independent efforts to clear up Morin's fate. It has been connected to the disappearance of Ahmed Hamadou who disappeared one year later in the same place as well as since 2017 to Nordahl Lelandais, an alleged serial killer who has been suspected to be responsible for Morin's and Hamadou's deaths.

== Life and disappearance ==
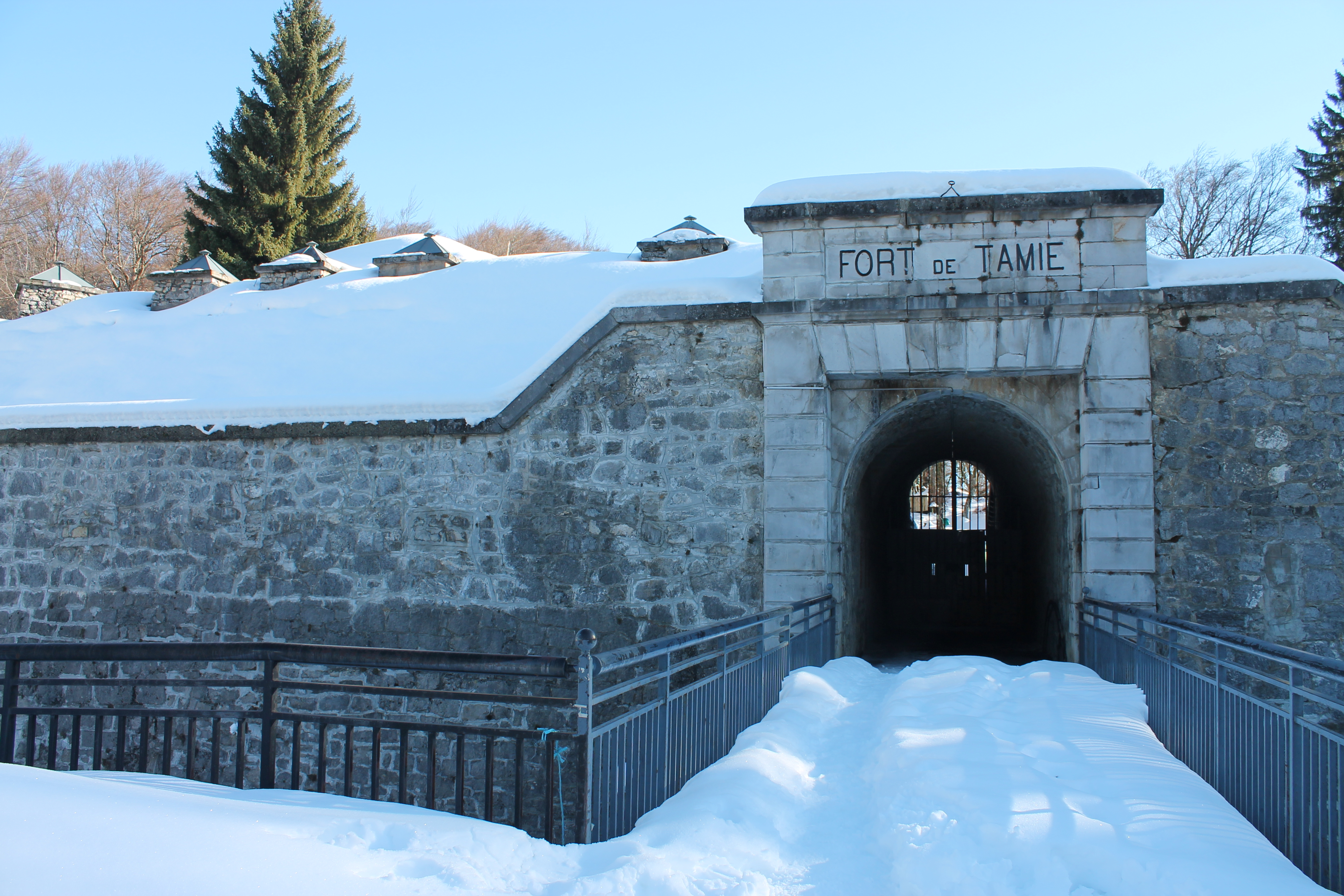
Fort de Tamié, the location of the Elements music festival during which Morin disappeared

Morin's family lived in Paris, but in 2009 he had relocated to Haute-Savoie where his sister lived. There he had held various short-term jobs. By 2011 he owned a van that he had converted himself into an RV and that at the time of his disappearance was parked near Lac de Passy. From there he hitchhiked to attended the electronic music festival Elements on 9 September 2011. The annual festival was held at a 19th century fort Tamié. At the night of the festival, around 3 a.m., a witness by the entrance to the festival area encountered Morin in a nervous state telling him that he had to leave because somebody was trying to hurt him.

This is the last verified appearance of Morin. The friend who had accompanied him to the festival had lost sight of him earlier that night. When he arrived back at Lac de Passy he didn't encounter Morin at his van. The family reported him to French police as missing. A search operation was not able to find any hints of Morin. However, weeks after Morin's disappearance a privately organized search party found his backpack in the woods near the fort next to a glass container with 10 euros.

A year later Ahmed Hamadou disappeared under similar circumstances from the same festival.

== Investigation ==
In late 2017 when Nordahl Lelandais became the prime suspect in the killing of Maëlys de Araujo and was subsequently suspected of being a serial killer, he became connected to a large number of cases, among them those of Morin and Hamadou. In March of 2018 both families brought criminal charges against Lelandais. A family member was able to obtain video footage from the 2012 festival and possibly identified Lelandais as one of the visitors. According to Morin's father, witness reports by visitors of the festival confirm Lelandais being present the night of Morin's disappearance.

In 2023 the French Cold Case center in Nanterre took on the case.

== Public reactions ==
In 2019 the French-German TV network arte released a documentary on Morin's case called Disparitions. It focuses on the disappointment of the family with the police investigations.

== See also ==
- List of people who disappeared mysteriously (2000–present)
