= Drad =

Drad may refer to:

- abbreviation of decirad (drad), a unit of radiation dose
- abbreviation of deciradian (drad), a unit of angle
- DraD, a class of bacterial adhesins

DRAD may refer to:

- DRAD, or EFEMP1, a protein
- Defending Rights & Dissent

== See also ==
- Drat (disambiguation)
- Dard (disambiguation)
