= Drat =

Drat may refer to:

- A minced oath for "damn"
- Drat! The Cat!, a 1965 Broadway musical
- Distrito de Riego Arenal-Tempisque (DRAT), see Water resources management in Costa Rica
- Deterministic Trim (DRAT), see Trim (computing)

== See also ==
- Drad (disambiguation)
