= Dard (surname) =

Dard is a surname. Notable people with the surname include:

- Charlotte-Adélaïde Dard (1788–1862), French writer
- Frédéric Dard (1921–2000), French crime writer
- Georges Dard (1918–2001), French footballer
- Khwaja Mir Dard (1721–1785), Urdu poet
