= Le Pont-de-Beauvoisin, Isère =

Pont-de-Beauvoisin
- Commune
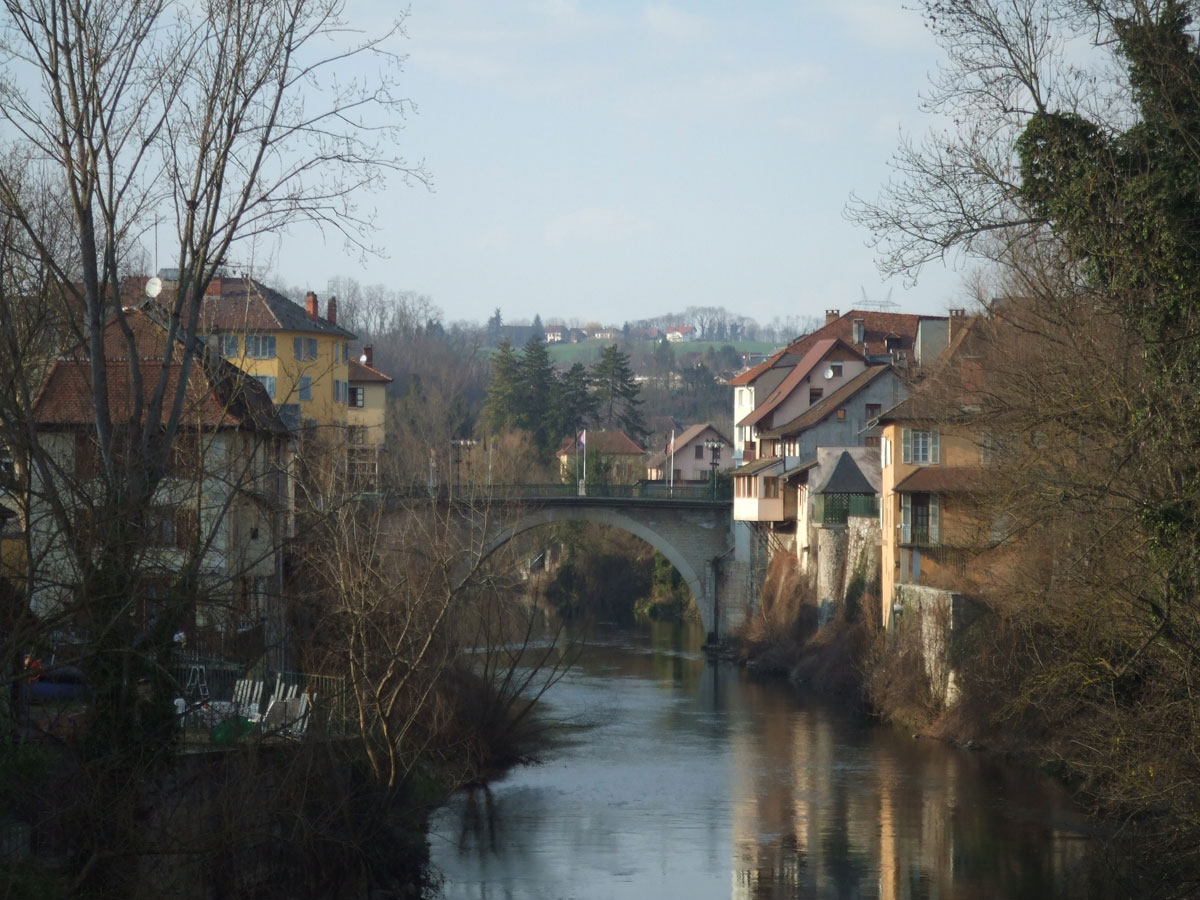
- Bridge over the Guiers

- Coat of arms
- Location of Pont-de-Beauvoisin
- Location within France Location within Auvergne-Rhône-Alpes
- Coordinates: 45°32′06″N 5°40′16″E
- Country: France
- Region: Auvergne-Rhône-Alpes
- Department: Isère
- Arrondissement: La Tour-du-Pin
- Canton: Chartreuse-Guiers

Government
  - Mayor (2020–2026): Michel Serrano
- Area^{1}: 7.36 km^{2} (2.84 sq mi)
- Highest elevation: 332 m (1,089 ft)
- Lowest elevation: 239 m (784 ft)
- Population (2023): 3,602
  - Density: 489/km^{2} (1,270/sq mi)
- Time zone: UTC+01:00 (CET)
  - Summer (DST): UTC+02:00 (CEST)
- INSEE/Postal code: 38315 /38480
- ^{1} French Land Register data, which excludes lakes, ponds, glaciers > 1 km^{2} (0.386 sq mi or 247 acres) and river estuaries.

Le Pont-de-Beauvoisin (French pronunciation: [lə pɔ̃ də bovwazɛ̃]; also: Pont-de-Beauvoisin) is a commune in the Isère department in southeastern France. It lies on the left bank of the Guiers, opposite Le Pont-de-Beauvoisin in Savoie.

== Population ==
Historical population

Year	Pop.	±% p.a.
1793	1,505	—
1800	1,482	−0.22%
1806	1,543	+0.67%
1821	1,849	+1.21%
1831	2,139	+1.47%
1836	2,125	−0.13%
1841	2,268	+1.31%
1846	2,214	−0.48%
1851	2,394	+1.58%
1856	2,056	−3.00%
1861	1,871	−1.87%
1866	1,873	+0.02%
1872	1,784	−0.81%
1876	1,845	+0.84%
1881	1,883	+0.41%
1886	2,067	+1.88%
1891	2,032	−0.34%
1896	2,010	−0.22%
1901	2,010	+0.00%

Year	Pop.	±% p.a.
1906	2,057	+0.46%
1911	2,120	+0.61%
1921	1,925	−0.96%
1926	2,011	+0.88%
1931	1,907	−1.06%
1936	1,917	+0.10%
1946	2,023	+0.54%
1954	2,053	+0.18%
1962	1,935	−0.74%
1968	2,716	+5.81%
1975	2,796	+0.42%
1982	2,564	−1.23%
1990	2,369	−0.98%
1999	2,504	+0.62%
2007	3,128	+2.82%
2012	3,499	+2.27%
2017	3,630	+0.74%
2023	3,602	−0.13%

Source: EHESS and INSEE (1968-2023)

== Climate ==
Le Pont-de-Beauvoisin is located in the alpine frontcountry. Its climate is a continental-influenced oceanic climate (Cfb), characterized by cool to cold, snowy winters and quite hot and humid summers under the Köppen system.

Climate data for Le Pont-de-Beauvoisin (1985–2010 averages)
Month	Jan	Feb	Mar	Apr	May	Jun	Jul	Aug	Sep	Oct	Nov	Dec	Year
Record high °C (°F)	21.3 (70.3)	23.7 (74.7)	28.5 (83.3)	30.2 (86.4)	33.7 (92.7)	38.6 (101.5)	38.3 (100.9)	41.1 (106.0)	33.9 (93.0)	29.2 (84.6)	25.6 (78.1)	22.5 (72.5)	41.1 (106.0)
Mean daily maximum °C (°F)	6.4 (43.5)	8.9 (48.0)	13.7 (56.7)	16.8 (62.2)	21.9 (71.4)	25.3 (77.5)	28.0 (82.4)	27.7 (81.9)	22.8 (73.0)	17.9 (64.2)	10.3 (50.5)	6.5 (43.7)	17.2 (62.9)
Daily mean °C (°F)	2.3 (36.1)	3.8 (38.8)	7.5 (45.5)	10.4 (50.7)	15.4 (59.7)	18.6 (65.5)	20.8 (69.4)	20.5 (68.9)	16.4 (61.5)	12.4 (54.3)	6.1 (43.0)	2.8 (37.0)	11.4 (52.5)
Mean daily minimum °C (°F)	−1.9 (28.6)	−1.3 (29.7)	1.2 (34.2)	4.0 (39.2)	8.8 (47.8)	11.8 (53.2)	13.7 (56.7)	13.3 (55.9)	9.9 (49.8)	7.0 (44.6)	1.9 (35.4)	−0.9 (30.4)	5.6 (42.1)
Record low °C (°F)	−17.0 (1.4)	−17.5 (0.5)	−14.4 (6.1)	−5.8 (21.6)	−1.6 (29.1)	1.5 (34.7)	5.0 (41.0)	3.4 (38.1)	−0.7 (30.7)	−5.0 (23.0)	−9.5 (14.9)	−17.0 (1.4)	−17.5 (0.5)
Average precipitation mm (inches)	76.2 (3.00)	71.3 (2.81)	82.5 (3.25)	105.4 (4.15)	107.2 (4.22)	102.7 (4.04)	89.2 (3.51)	87.8 (3.46)	112.4 (4.43)	117.1 (4.61)	104.1 (4.10)	87.4 (3.44)	1,143.3 (45.02)
Average precipitation days	10.0	9.1	10.5	11.6	10.9	9.7	7.7	8.7	8.2	10.7	10.9	10.6	118.6
Source: Infoclimat, Météociel

== History ==
On 27 August 2017, an eight-year-old French girl Maëlys de Araujo was murdered here. Maëlys de Araujo's birthday is on 5 November 2008.

== International relations ==
- Erbach im Odenwald, Germany

== See also ==
- Communes of the Isère department
- Disappearance of Maëlys de Araujo
