= Chevaline, Haute-Savoie =

Chevaline Shvalnà (Savoyard)
- Commune
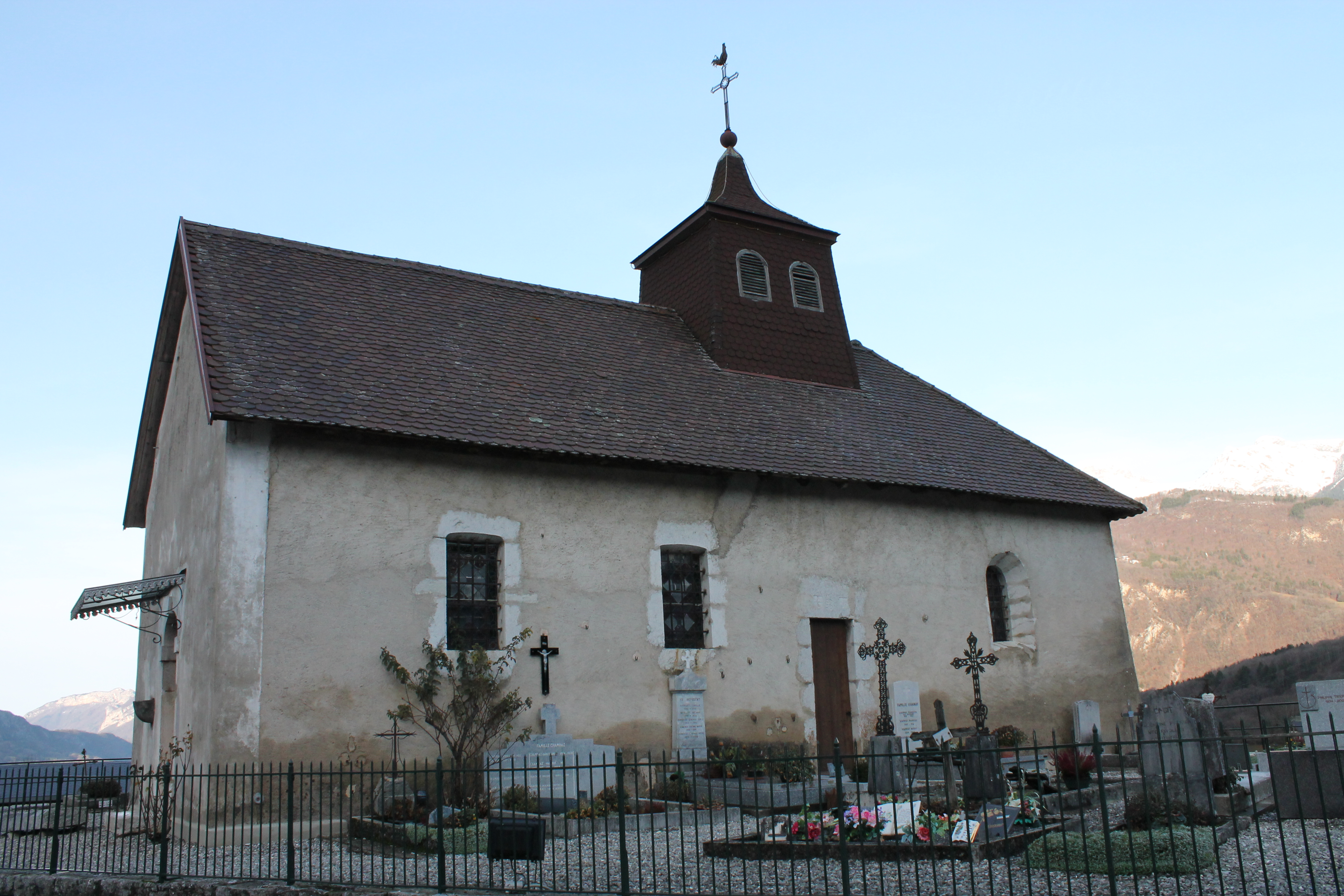
- The 17th-century church of Saint-Martin
- Location of Chevaline
- Location within France Location within Auvergne-Rhône-Alpes
- Coordinates: 45°45′48″N 6°13′14″E
- Country: France
- Region: Auvergne-Rhône-Alpes
- Department: Haute-Savoie
- Arrondissement: Annecy
- Canton: Faverges
- Intercommunality: C.C. des Sources du Lac d'Annecy

Government
  - Mayor (2020–2026): Michèle Domenge-Chenal
- Area^{1}: 14.16 km^{2} (5.47 sq mi)
- Highest elevation: 2,176 m (7,139 ft)
- Lowest elevation: 503 m (1,650 ft)
- Population (2023): 181
  - Density: 12.8/km^{2} (33.1/sq mi)
- Time zone: UTC+01:00 (CET)
  - Summer (DST): UTC+02:00 (CEST)
- INSEE/Postal code: 74072 /74210
- ^{1} French Land Register data, which excludes lakes, ponds, glaciers > 1 km^{2} (0.386 sq mi or 247 acres) and river estuaries.

Chevaline (French pronunciation: [ʃəvalin]; Savoyard: Shvalnà) is a commune in the southeastern French department of Haute-Savoie.

== See also ==
- Communes of the Haute-Savoie department
- Annecy shootings
