= Institut de recherche criminelle de la gendarmerie nationale =

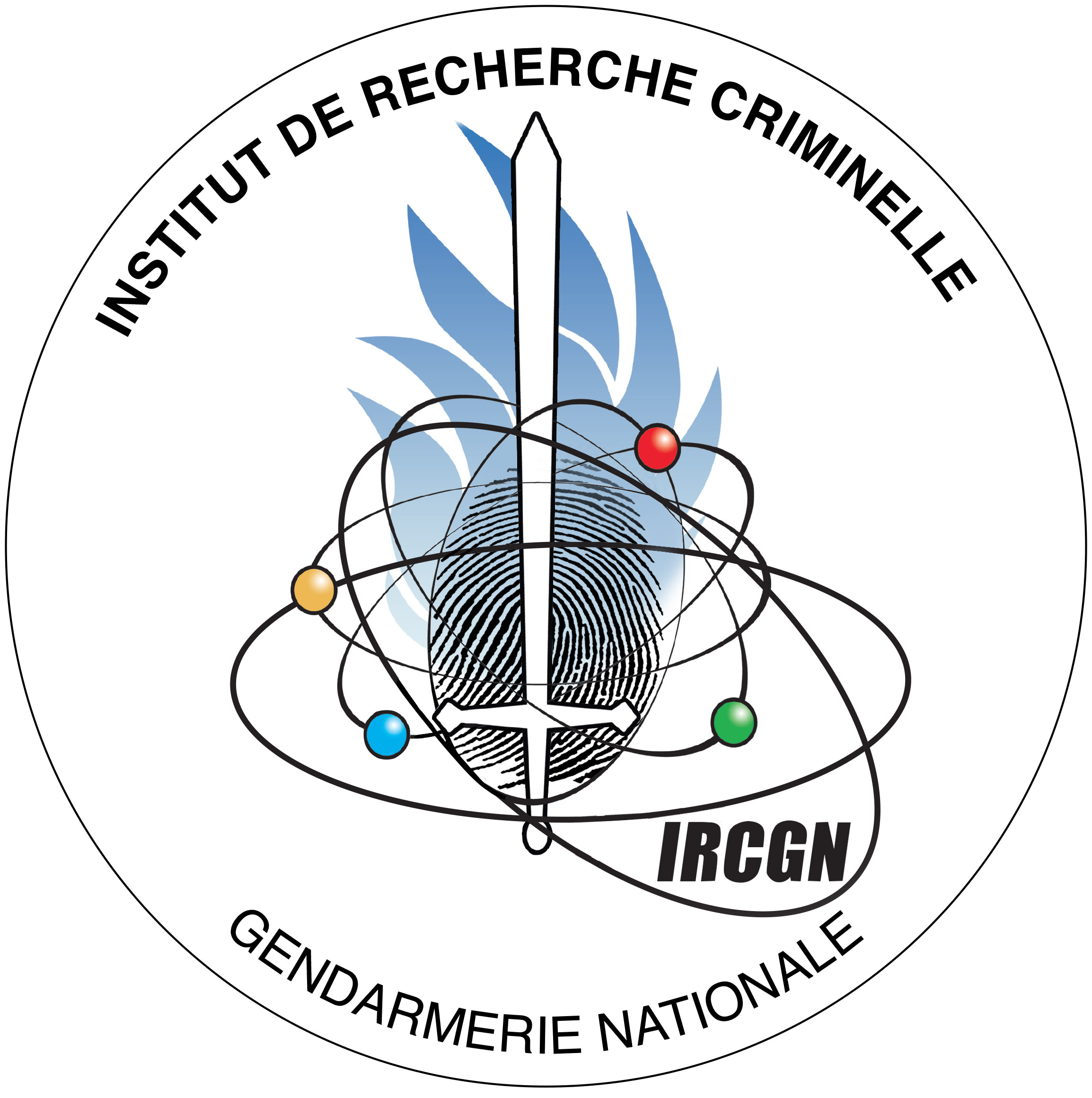
- Abbreviation: IRCGN
- Formation: 1987
- Purpose: Integrated forensic institute for French Gendarmerie investigations
- Location: 5 Boulevard de l'Hautil, Cergy, France
- Leader: Colonel Franck Marescal
- Affiliations: Gendarmerie nationale, Minister of the Interior

The Institut de recherche criminelle de la gendarmerie nationale (IRCGN) is the forensic science department of the French National Gendarmerie.

== See also ==
- Institut national de police scientifique
