= Détachement d'Action Rapide et de Dissuasion =

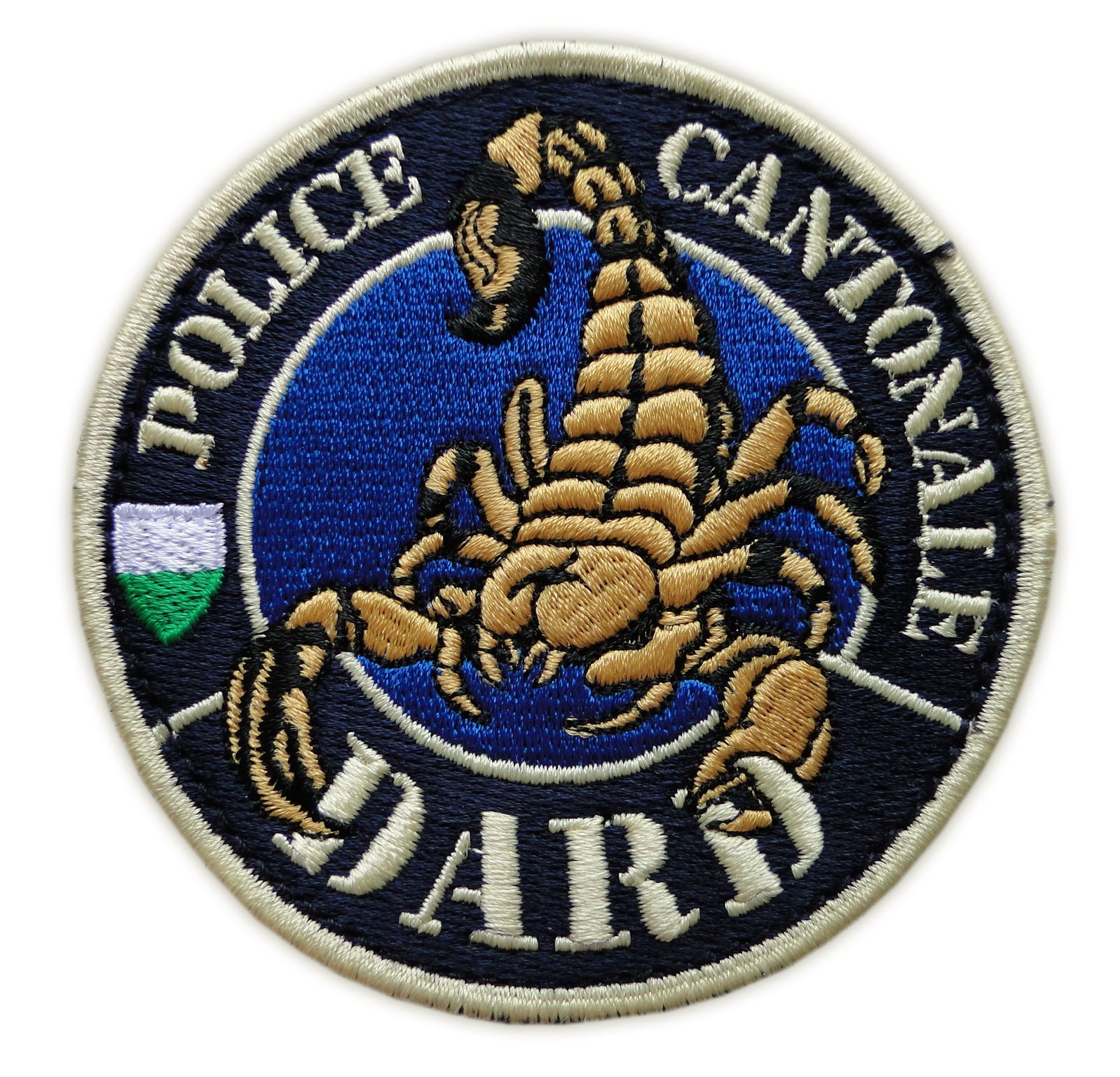
- DARD Patch
- Active: 1 September 1991 – present
- Country: Switzerland
- Type: Police tactical unit
- Size: Classified
- Part of: Vaud Cantonal Police
- Garrison/HQ: Centre d'Intervention Régional (English: Regional Intervention Centre), La Blécherette, Lausanne, Vaud
- Nickname: DARD

Commanders
- Notable commanders: Olivier Durgnat

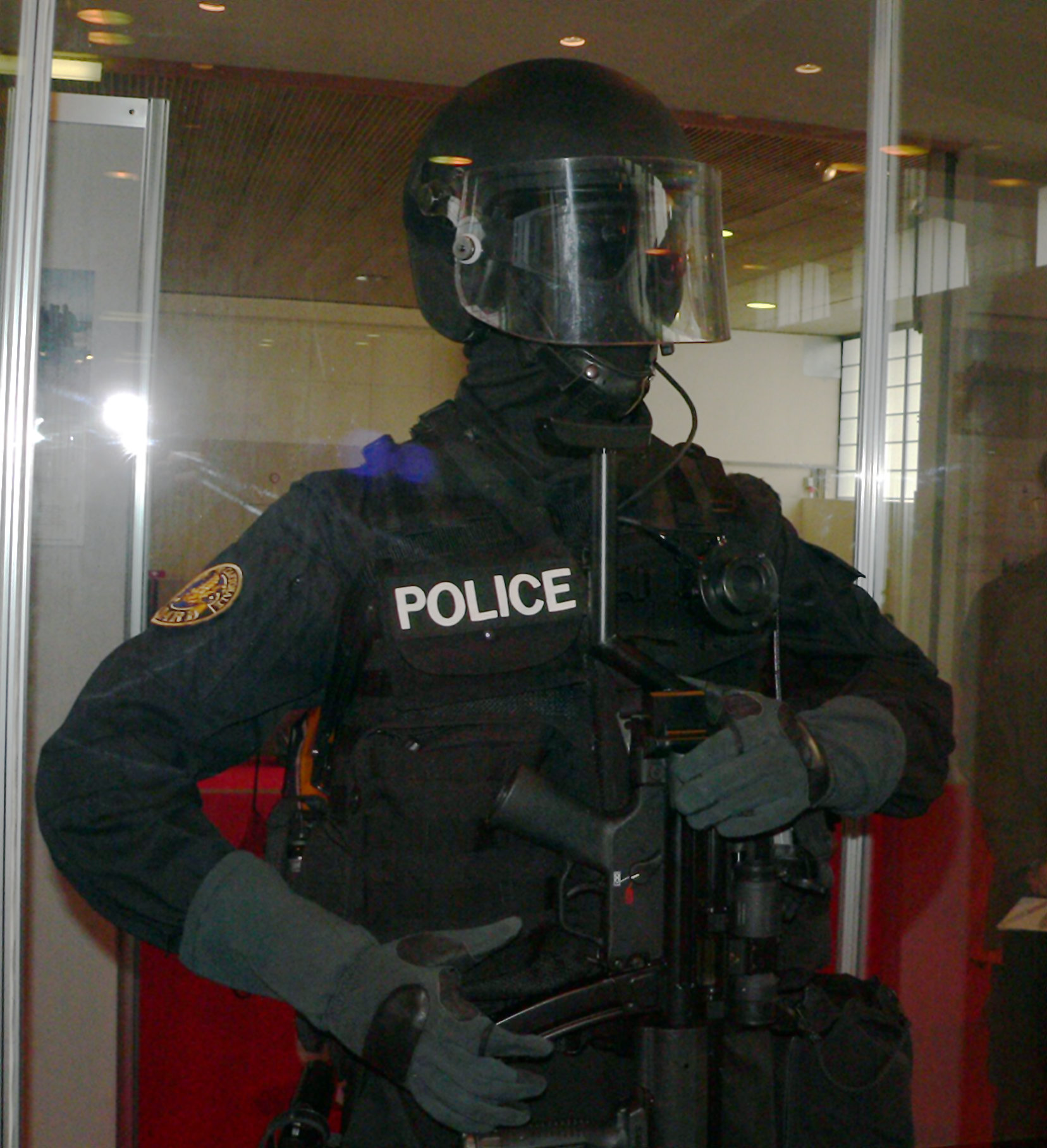
A model of a DARD operator in specialist gear

The Détachement d'Action Rapide et de Dissuasion (DARD) (English: Swift Action and Deterrent Detachment) is a specialist unit of the cantonal police of Vaud, originally established to counter the growing rate of terrorism in Europe during the herald of the 1970s. They are based in the Centre d'Intervention Régional (English: Regional Intervention Centre), located in La Blécherette in the city of Lausanne.

The acronym DARD means "stinger" in French.

== History ==
DARD was founded on 1 September 1991 in Vaud, due to concerns of the canton regarding terrorism at the cantonal level. It is an extension of the previous réserve d'intervention ("intervention reserve") which was composed of 6 gendarmes. By contrast, the DARD is a standing unit of 13 gendarmes. One of its known commanders was Olivier Durgnat.

== Known operations ==
Skinheads were apprehended by DARD operators during a march on 30 June 2003. DARD was mobilised to hunt down an armed robber who had robbed a bank on 7 November 2006. DARD units were deployed to Bussigny-près-Lausanne on 12 November 2007 after an armed man was reported to Vaud police; the armed suspect was wounded before being taken to a hospital.

DARD operators were deployed on 14 May 2008 in an anti-drug operation to seize hemp. DARD was also deployed to conduct another anti-drug operation with 25 people arrested.

A DARD unit was mobilised to assist sûreté detectives on 20 August 2008 to dissuade a man from committing suicide, which failed despite negotiations by DARD negotiators and detectives.

On 9 January 2009, DARD units had been mobilised in a manhunt to arrest two suspects responsible for killing a sexagenarian man on 29 December 2008.

== Canine units ==
After starting a training program started in 2005, with the first dog accepted into DARD service in 2006, DARD now uses canine units in most of its operations.

== Equipment ==
DARD operators are issued the following firearms:

- Glock 17
- SIG-Sauer P226
- Heckler & Koch MP5
- SIG SG 550
