= Terrorism in Denmark =

Terrorism in Denmark refers to terrorist attacks carried out in Denmark or by people connected to Denmark. Like other countries Denmark increased its focus on defending against terrorist attacks after the September 11 attacks in New York in 2001. The September 11 attacks led to strengthened laws in a number of areas. 31 May 2002 the parliament of Denmark (Danish: Folketing) approved anti-terror legislation with the aim of preventing terrorism in Denmark and internationally. The new legislation aligned with the definitions of terrorism which were in use by the European Union and the United Nations.

== Terrorist incidents and trials ==
=== 1985 ===
1985 Copenhagen bombings - Main synagogue in Copenhagen and airline office were hit by a bomb placed by Hezbollah terrorists. While no people were injured in the attack on the synagogue, a second bomb placed by the same group destroyed the Copenhagen offices of the American Northwest Orient Airlines, killing one person and injuring 26. Several Arabs residing in Europe, among them Mohammed Abu Talb, were later convicted for these and other attacks.

=== 1992 ===
The 1992 Copenhagen bombing (Danish: Søllerødgadebomben) took place in the offices of the International Socialists (IS) in Copenhagen, Denmark. The blast and a resulting fire destroyed the office and killed 29-year-old Henrik Christensen. It has been presumed to be a political attack, but no one has been convicted.

=== 2005 ===
The Glostrup case, also called the Glostrup-Sarajevo bomb plot, was a thwarted jihadist terror plot that was uncovered in October 2005 in Glostrup, Denmark, and in Bosnia. In October 2005, Mirsad Bektašević and Abdulkadir Cesur were arrested in Bosnia for plotting a terrorist attack. Following their arrests, a connection was uncovered to a terrorist cell in Denmark that involved four men who had helped them obtain the explosives for the plot, all of whom had grown up in Denmark. All four were tried, but only one was found guilty, Abdul Basit Abu-Lifâ. Abdulkadir and Bektašević were sentenced to 13 and 15 years in prison, respectively, and Abu-Lifâ was sentenced to seven years. It was the first major terrorist case in Denmark that involved homegrown terrorists, and the first time any person had been convicted of terrorism under Danish law.

=== 2006 ===
The Vollsmose terrorists were three men convicted of attempted terrorism in Denmark in 2007–2008. Nine men were initially arrested by Danish police in the Vollsmose neighbourhood of Odense on 5 September 2006, but most were later released without charges, including a police mole who played a role in the investigation and trial. Four men were charged with attempted terrorism, three of whom were convicted. According to Danish police, the group had been under investigation for quite a while.

Lene Espersen, the Danish Minister of Justice, called the plot "the most severe ever in Denmark" and said the group were planning one or more terrorist attacks against targets in Denmark. It was later claimed that they had planned on using bombs to attack the Folketing (Danish Parliament), Jyllands-Posten (the newspaper involved in the 2005 cartoon controversy), Copenhagen's City Hall Square or another unspecified target. The group was motivated by Islamic extremism.

=== 2007 ===
2007 Al Qaeda Plot in Copenhagen - Danish police officers and Security Intelligence Service agents arrested eight, six of which were released after questioning. The two remaining, described as Islamic militants with ties to Al Qaeda, were convicted in 2008 of planning terrorism with the use of bombs.

In 2007, Morocco-born Said Mansour was the first to be charged with the offence of inciting terrorism. Material produced by him has been found by several convicted terrorists worldwide. In 2014, he was sentenced again by the Fredriksberg court to four years in jail for publishing extremist islamist material thereby supporting al-Qaeda. In 2015 the Østre Landsret upholds the sentenced and strips Mansour of his Danish citizenship and issues a deportation order. In June 2016, the supreme court upholds the deportation order. After the supreme court decision, Danish authorities negotiated with Morocco on a repatriation treaty. He was deported in January 2019.

=== 2010 ===
2010 Copenhagen terror plot - Security services in Denmark and Sweden thwarted a terrorist plot against Jyllands-Posten, the publisher of the controversial cartoons of Muhammad in 2005. In several raids they detained five men, who were described as militant islamists. Automatic weapons, together with ammunition and silencers, were seized by the police.

Hotel Jørgensen explosion - An attempted letter bomb attack by a Belgian of Chechen ethnicity.

=== 2012 ===
Two Somali brothers residing in Denmark were arrested in May 2012 on suspicion of preparing a terrorist attack and the elder was alleged to have undergone training by Al-Shabaab. In February 2013 they were charged with financing terrorism and terrorist training. The younger brother admitted to supporting Al-Shabaab in the district court. Upon appeal, both brothers were sentenced for attempted terrorist training in the appeals court.

=== 2015 ===
2015 Copenhagen shootings - shooting attacks in Copenhagen beginning in the afternoon of 14 February at a public event called "Art, Blasphemy and Freedom of Expression" at Krudttønden cultural centre, followed by another at the Great Synagogue just after midnight (i.e., 15 February), and finally the killing of the perpetrator in the early morning by police. Two victims and the perpetrator were killed, while five police officers were wounded.

=== 2016 ===
The Kundby case - a 2016 plan to bomb two schools in Denmark, including a Jewish school in Copenhagen. The girl, 15-years-old at the time of her plan and a recent convert to Islam, was convicted in 2017.

2016 Copenhagen terror plot - an attempted attack on Copenhagen with bombs and knives by two Syrian refugees (one living in Sweden, another in Germany) under direction of Islamic State instructions.

=== 2018 ===
Ringsted terror plot - A Norwegian-Iranian was arrested and suspected of having planned Iranian intelligence operations in Denmark. Both Norwegian PST and Danish PET also suspected the man to take part in the planning of an assassination against the leader of the Iranian group Arab Struggle Movement for the Liberation of Ahvaz. He was arrested in Gothenburg in Sweden on 21 October.

=== 2019 ===
Danish Security and Intelligence Service (PET) and police arrested around 20 people throughout Denmark 11 December 2019, 8 of which have been charged with attempted terrorism. They had bought bomb-making materials and tried (unsuccessfully) to acquire firearms. It is unknown if their target was in Denmark or abroad, but the motive was radical Islamist ideology.

=== 2024 ===
Two Swedish teenagers were arrested by Danish Police in connection with a bomb blast near the Israeli Embassy in Copenhagen on October 2. The attack is investigated as a possible terror attack. Swedish television stated that the attacks were suspected to be initiated by the Foxtrot network on orders from Iran.

== See also ==
- Terrorism in Europe
- Islamic terrorism in Europe
- List of terrorist incidents
- Terrorism in the United States
- Hindu terrorism
  - Violence against Christians in India
- Left-wing terrorism
- Right-wing terrorism
