= List of terrorist incidents in Denmark =

This is a list of major incidents in Denmark where an organized group has attempted an act of violence targeting innocents. Dates in boldface are attacks that were carried out, dates without boldface are the date of arrest in plots that were not carried out.

Date	Type	Dead	Injured	Location and description
**22 July 1985**	Terror bombing	1	26	**1985 Copenhagen bombings** - Main synagogue in Copenhagen and airline office were hit by a bomb placed by Hezbollah terrorists. While no people were injured in the attack on the synagogue, a second bomb placed by the same group destroyed the Copenhagen offices of the American Northwest Orient Airlines, killing one person and injuring 26. Several Arabs residing in Europe, among them Mohammed Abu Talb, were later convicted for these and other attacks.
**16 March 1992**	Terror bombing	1	0	**1992 Copenhagen bombing** - The office of International Socialists was hit by a bomb, and one person was killed. The case remains unsolved.
5 September 2006	Attempted bomb plot	0	0	**Vollsmose terrorist trial** - nine people were arrested in Odense on 5 September 2006. Four were charged and three of them were convicted of attempted terrorism. They were motivated by Islamic extremism and planned on detonating bombs in one or more locations in Denmark. The Danish Minister of Justice called the terrorist plot the most severe in the history of Denmark.
4 September 2007	Attempted bomb plot	0	0	**2007 Al Qaeda Plot in Copenhagen** - Danish police officers and Security Intelligence Service agents arrested eight, six of whom were released after questioning. The two remaining, described as Islamic militants with ties to Al Qaeda, were convicted in 2008 of planning terrorism with the use of bombs.
29 December 2010	Attempted shooting plot	0	0	**2010 Copenhagen terror plot** - Security services in Denmark and Sweden thwarted a terrorist plot against Jyllands-Posten, the publisher of the controversial cartoons of Muhammad in 2005. In several raids, they detained five men, who were described as militant Islamists. Automatic weapons, together with ammunition and silencers, were seized by the police.
May 2012	Attempted terror plot	0	0	Two Somali brothers residing in Denmark were arrested in May 2012 on suspicion of preparing a terrorist attack and the elder was alleged to have undergone training by Al-Shabaab. In February 2013 they were charged with financing terrorism and terrorist training. The younger brother admitted to supporting Al-Shabaab in the district court. Upon appeal, both brothers were sentenced for attempted terrorist training in the appeals court.
**14 February 2015**	Shooting	2 (+1 perp.)	5	**2015 Copenhagen shootings** - shooting attacks in Copenhagen beginning in the afternoon of 14 February at a public event called "Art, Blasphemy, and Freedom of Expression" at Krudttønden cultural centre, followed by another at the Great Synagogue just after midnight (i.e., 15 February), and finally the killing of the perpetrator in the early morning by police. Two victims and the perpetrator were killed, while five police officers were wounded.
13 January 2016	Attempted bomb plot	0	0	**The Kundby case** - a 2016 plan to bomb two schools in Denmark, including a Jewish school in Copenhagen. The girl, 15 years old at the time of her plan and a recent convert to Islam, was convicted in 2017.
November 2016	Attempted bombs and knives plot	0	0	**2016 Copenhagen terror plot** - an attempted attack on Copenhagen with bombs and knives by two Syrian refugees (one living in Sweden, another in Germany) under the direction of Islamic State instructions.
21 October 2018	Attempted assassination plot	0	0	**Ringsted terror plot** - A Norwegian-Iranian was arrested and suspected of having planned Iranian intelligence operations in Denmark. Both Norwegian PST and Danish PET also suspected the man to take part in the planning of an assassination against the leader of the Iranian group Arab Struggle Movement for the Liberation of Ahvaz. He was arrested in Gothenburg, Sweden on 21 October.
11 December 2019	Attempted bomb and shooting plot	0	0	Danish Security and Intelligence Service (PET) and police arrested around 20 people throughout Denmark, 8 of whom have been charged with attempted terrorism. They had bought bomb-making materials and tried (unsuccessfully) to acquire firearms. It is unknown if their target was in Denmark or abroad, but the motive was radical Islamist ideology.
9 February 2021	Attempted bomb and shooting plot	0	0	Danish Security and Intelligence Service (PET) and police arrested 13 people in Holbæk.
