= Islamic terrorism in Europe =

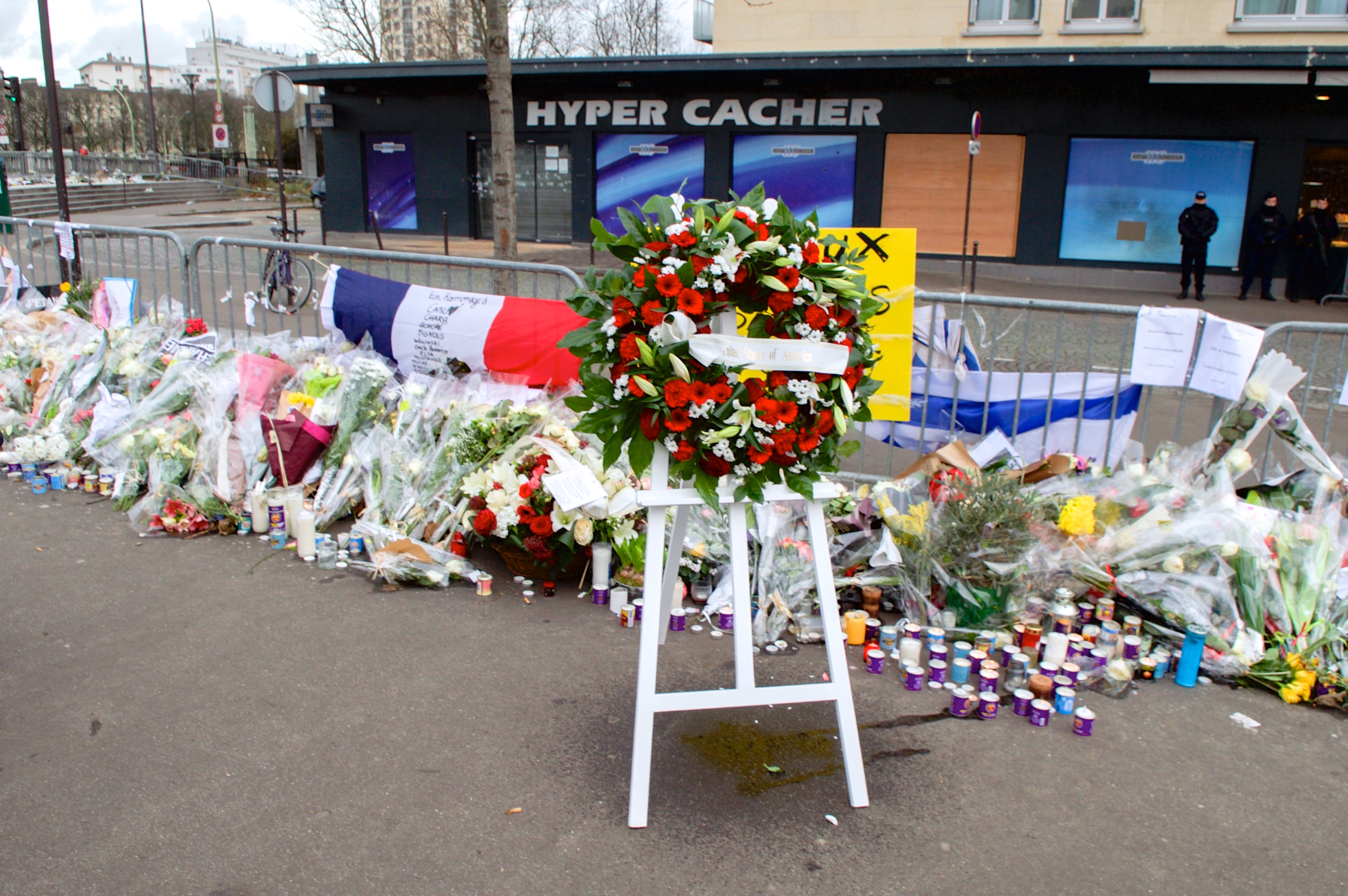
Memorial to the people killed in the January 2015 Île-de-France attacks

Islamic terrorism (also known as "Islamist terrorism" or "Jihadist terrorism") has been carried out in Europe by the jihadist groups Islamic State (ISIL) or Al-Qaeda as well as Islamist lone wolves since the late 20th century. Europol, which releases the annual EU Terrorism Situation and Trend report (TE-SAT), used the term "Islamist terrorism" in reports for the years 2006–2010, "religiously inspired terrorism" for the years 2011–2014, and has used "jihadist terrorism" since then. (Note: This corresponds to the reports released in 2007–2011, 2012–2015, and 2016 and onwards, respectively. The year in the TE-SAT title is the year it was released, which is the year after the year the events it deals with occurred.) Europol defines jihadism as "a violent ideology exploiting traditional Islamic concepts".

In the 2000s, the deadliest attacks of this period were the 2004 Madrid train bombings, which killed 193 civilians (the deadliest Islamist attack in Europe), and the 7 July 2005 London bombings, which killed 52.

After 2014, there was a rise in Islamic terrorist incidents in Europe. The years 2014–16 saw more people killed by Islamic terrorist attacks in Europe than all previous years combined, and the highest rate of attack plots per year. Most of this terrorist activity was inspired by ISIL, and many European states have had some involvement in the military intervention against it. A number of plots involved people who entered or re-entered Europe as asylum seekers during the European migrant crisis, and some attackers had returned to Europe after fighting in the Syrian civil war. The Jewish Museum of Belgium shooting in May 2014 was the first attack in Europe by a returnee from the Syrian war.

While most earlier Islamic terrorist attacks in Europe were carried out by groups and involved bombs, most attacks since 2014 have been carried out by individuals using guns, knives and vehicles. The deadliest attacks of this period have been the November 2015 Paris attacks (130 killed). These attacks and threats have led to major security operations and plans such as Opération Sentinelle in France, Operation Vigilant Guardian and the Brussels lockdown in Belgium, and Operation Temperer in the United Kingdom.

== Definition ==
The 2020 TE-SAT by Europol describes jihadism as "a violent ideology exploiting traditional Islamic concepts". Jihadists do this by exploiting the concept of jihad, which means 'striving' or 'exertion' but can also refer to religiously sanctioned warfare and aim to create an Islamic state governed exclusively by their interpretation of Islamic law. The report describes jihadism as a violent subcurrent of Salafism, while noting that other subcurrents of Salafism are quietist. The two major representatives of jihadism are al-Qaeda and ISIL.

== Overview ==
Jihadist terrorism in the European Union
Year	Attacks (Note: failed, foiled, and completed)	Deaths (Note: not including attackers)
2006	1	Not reported
2007	4	Not reported
2008	0	Not reported
2009	1	Not reported
2010	3	Not reported
2011	0	Not reported
2012	6	8
2013	0	1
2014	2	4
2015	17	150
2016	13	135
2017	33	62
2018	24	13
2019	21	10
2020	14	12
2021	11	2
2022	6	3
2023	14	6

The first incidents of jihadist terrorism occurred in France in 1995 when a network with ties to Algeria carried out a string of bombings in Paris in retaliation for French involvement in the Algerian Civil War.

In the early 2000s, much of this terrorist activity was linked to Al-Qaeda and the plots tended to involve groups carrying out co-ordinated bombings. The deadliest attacks of this period were the 2004 Madrid train bombings, which killed 193 civilians (the deadliest Islamist attack in Europe), and the 7 July 2005 London bombings, which killed 52.

Although militants in Syria had started to organize attacks in Europe by sending terrorist operatives to carry out attacks as early as 2012, security services in the European countries they sought to attack did not see the arrested individuals as part of a network with a cohesive strategy. Instead the general consensus saw them as radicalized individuals. Many of these operatives were arrested, while others carried out unsophisticated attacks which caused little damage but still served to overload security services.

Since 2014, more than 20 fatal attacks have been carried out in Europe. France saw eight attacks between January 2015 and July 2016; this included the January 2015 Île-de-France attacks, the November 2015 Paris attacks, and the July 2016 Nice truck attack. The United Kingdom saw three major attacks carried out in a span of four months in early 2017 (Westminster attack, Manchester Arena bombing, and London Bridge attack). Other targets in Europe have included Belgium, Germany, Russia, and Spain. The transcontinental city of Istanbul also saw both bombings and shootings, including in January 2016, June 2016 and January 2017.

In 2015, the Islamic State, which in 2014 had claimed that all Muslims were under a religious obligation to join it, declared that the only excuse for Muslims to not join the group in territories under its control was to perpetrate terrorist attacks in their current place of residence. According to Europol's annual report released in 2017, the Islamic State exploited the flow of refugees and migrants to commit acts of terrorism, which was a feature of the 2015 Paris attacks. In 2016 attack planning against Western countries took place in Syria and Iraq. Groups such as al-Qaeda and ISIL had the intent and capabilities to mount mass casualty attacks with volunteers.

The Counter Extremism Project states police investigations have found links between internet radicalization and terrorist attacks. In 2019, Julian King, the European Commissioner for the Security Union, stated that terrorist content on the internet "had a role to play in every single attack on European soil in the last few years". However, Swedish news agency Tidningarnas Telegrambyrå reviewed attacks in Western Europe between 2014 and 2017 and stated that most attackers radicalize as a result of personal contact rather than online.

In 2017, the EU Counter-terrorism Coordinator Gilles de Kerchove stated in an interview that there were more than 50,000 radicals and jihadists in Europe. In 2016, French authorities stated that 15,000 of the 20,000 individuals on the list of security threats belong to Islamist movements. After the Manchester Arena bombing in May 2017, British authorities and MI5 estimated they had 500 ongoing investigations into 3,000 jihadist extremists as potential terrorist attackers, with a further 20,000 having been "subjects of interest" in the past, including the Manchester and Westminster attackers.

According to Lorenzo G. Vidino, jihadi terrorists in Europe mobilized by ISIL have tended to be second-generation immigrant Muslims. Consequently, countries such as Italy and Spain with a smaller demographic in this category have experienced fewer attacks than countries in Central and Northern Europe such as France, the United Kingdom, Germany and Belgium.

British think tank ICSR argues for a connection between terrorism and crime: up to 40% of terrorist plots in Europe are part-financed through petty crime such as drug-dealing, theft, robberies, loan fraud and burglaries, and most jihadists have been imprisoned for petty or violent crime prior to radicalisation (some of whom radicalise while in prison). Jihadists use ordinary crime as a way to finance their activity and have also argued this to be the "ideologically correct" way to wage 'jihad 'in 'lands of war'.

According to German anthropologist Susanne Schröter, attacks in European countries in 2017 showed that the military defeat of the Islamic State did not mean the end of Islamist violence. Schröter also compared the events in Europe to a jihadist strategy formulated in 2005 by Abu Musab al-Suri, where an intensification of terror would destabilise societies and encourage Muslim youth to revolt. The expected civil war never materialised in Europe, but did occur in other regions such as Libya, Syria, Iraq and the Philippines (Battle of Marawi).

Planned and foiled Jihadist attacks in Europe Journal of Peace Research, revised figures.
Year	Foiled attacks	Launched attacks	Total
1994	0	1	1
1995	2	8	10
1996	2	0	2
1997	N/A	N/A	N/A
1998	1	0	1
1999	N/A	N/A	N/A
2000	1	0	1
2001	5	1	6
2002	7	0	7
2003	10	1	11
2004	10	2	12
2005	4	2	6
2006	6	1	7
2007	6	1	7
2008	6	2	8
2009	4	2	6
2010	9	4	13
2011	6	1	7
2012	8	4	12
2013	11	4	15
2014	12	3	15
2015	17	10	27
2016	32	24	56
2017	26	20	46
2018	19	11	30
2019	22	7	29
2020	9	16	25
2021	10	11	21

== List of attacks ==
=== 1994–1995 ===
Date	Location	Article	Details	Deaths	Injuries
24–26 December 1994	Marignane near Marseille, France	Air France Flight 8969	Four members of the Armed Islamic Group of Algeria (GIA) hijacked an Air France plane with 220 passengers in Algiers, the capital city of Algeria, intending to blow up the plane over the Eiffel Tower in Paris. 3 passengers were killed by the terrorists to put pressure on the Algerian and French governments. When the aircraft made a stopover at the Marseille Provence Airport for a refuelling, the French National Gendarmerie Intervention Group stormed the plane and killed all four hijackers.	3 (+ 4 attackers)	25
25 July–17 October 1995	Paris and Auvergne-Rhône-Alpes, France	1995 France bombings	A series of attacks carried out by the Armed Islamic Group of Algeria between July and October 1995 targeted public transport systems in Paris and Lyon, as well as a Jewish school in Villeurbanne, seeking to oppose French support of the Algerian regime during the Algerian Civil War and to extend the conflict to the former colonial ruler. 8 people were killed and 157 injured in the bombings.	8	157

=== 2000–2013 ===
Date	Location	Article	Details	Deaths	Injuries
15-20 November 2003	Istanbul, Turkey	2003 Istanbul bombings	The 2003 Istanbul bombings were a series of suicide attacks carried out with trucks fitted with bombs detonated at four different locations in Istanbul, Turkey on November 15 and 20, 2003. The first two attacks were carried out on November 15, 2003, against the Bet Israel Synagogue in Şişli and the Neve Shalom Synagogue in Beyoğlu. Five days later, on November 20 two truck bombs exploded at the British Consulate in Beyoğlu and at the HSBC General Directorate building in Beşiktaş.	55 (+4 attackers)	Over 750
11 March 2004	Madrid, Spain	Madrid train bombings	Ten bombs exploded almost simultaneously aboard four commuter trains in Madrid during rush hour, killing 193 civilians and injuring about 2,000. The bombs had been hidden in backpacks by a group of Islamists linked to Al-Qaeda. On 3 April, five suspects blew themselves up as police raided a flat in which they were hiding, killing themselves and a police officer.	193	2,050
2 November 2004	Amsterdam, Netherlands	Murder of Theo van Gogh	Dutch filmmaker Theo van Gogh was shot dead on a street in Amsterdam by Islamist Mohammed Bouyeri, a member of the 'Hofstad Network'. Van Gogh had received death threats for producing the film Submission with Ayaan Hirsi Ali, which criticises the treatment of women in Islam. Bouyeri also attempted to behead Van Gogh and pinned a threatening letter to his body. In July 2005, he was sentenced to life in prison for murder with terrorist intent.	1	2
7 July 2005	London, United Kingdom	7 July 2005 London bombings	There were four co-ordinated suicide bombings in London during rush hour. Three Islamists blew themselves up aboard London Underground trains and another aboard a bus. Fifty-two civilians were killed and more than 700 were injured. A 2019 article in the Journal of Security and Sustainability Issues described it as the first Islamic terrorist attack in the city.	52 (+4 attackers)	784
30 June 2007	Glasgow, United Kingdom	Glasgow Airport attack	Two Islamists attempted to drive a jeep, loaded with propane tanks, into the main entrance of Glasgow Airport, Scotland. The jeep struck bollards and caught fire. One of the men threw petrol bombs while the other attempted to take out the propane tanks. They fought police and bystanders but were eventually subdued. The driver died of burns on 2 August. A day before the attack, the men had planted car bombs in London which failed to detonate. Europol classified the attacks as Islamist terrorism.	0 (+1 attacker)	5
12 October 2009	Milan, Italy	–	A Libyan man detonated an explosive device at the entrance to Santa Barbara military barracks in Milan, after being stopped by guards. The attacker was badly burned and a guard was injured. Europol classified the attack as Islamist terrorism.	0	2
1 January 2010	Denmark	Kurt Westergaard	A 28-year-old Somali made an attempt to murder the Danish cartoonist Kurt Westergaard, who managed to evade his attacker. As police arrived, the man attacked the officer's patrol vehicle with an axe. The first patrol car reversed away with the perpetrator following and an officer in a second patrol car shot and wounded the perpetrator in the arms and legs. Westergaard has been living under police protection since the publication of his caricature of the Islamic prophet Muhammad. The perpetrator was found to have links to the radical Islamist organisation Al-Shabaab and in February 2011 he was sentenced to nine years in prison. Europol classified the attack as Islamist terrorism.		(1)
11 December 2010	Stockholm, Sweden	2010 Stockholm bombings	There were two blasts in central Stockholm. A car bomb partly detonated, injuring two bystanders, and shortly after a suicide bomber blew himself up nearby. Only one of the pipe bombs he carried detonated and no bystanders were hurt. Europol classified the attack as Islamist terrorism.	0 (+1 attacker)	2
2 March 2011	Frankfurt Airport, Germany	2011 Frankfurt Airport shooting	In a bus at Frankfurt Airport, a Kosovan employee of the airport opened fire on unarmed US soldiers. Two soldiers were killed and two others seriously wounded. According to the court judge at Oberlandesgericht Frankfurt, this was the first terrorist attack in Germany in which the perpetrator had an Islamist motive.	2	2
11–22 March 2012	Toulouse and Montauban, France	Toulouse and Montauban shootings	An Islamist, Mohammed Merah, carried out a string of gun attacks on French soldiers and civilians. On 11 March he shot dead an off-duty soldier in Toulouse. On 15 March he shot three off-duty soldiers in Montauban, killing two. On 19 March, he opened fire at a Jewish school in Toulouse, killing a rabbi and three children. On 22 March, he was shot dead by police at his apartment after a lengthy standoff. Europol classified the attacks as religiously inspired terrorism.	7 (+1 attacker)	5
19 September 2012	Sarcelles near Paris, France	Cannes-Torcy cell	In 2012 two assailants threw a grenade at a kosher market in Sarcelles, Paris, wounding one person. One of the grenade throwers and the leader of the cell, rapper Jérémie Louis-Sidney, was shot and killed during 6 October 2012 by BRI police from Strasbourg during his arrest. In June 2017 Jérémy Bailly, the other grenade thrower, was sentenced to 28 years in prison for the grenade attacks, planning other jihadist attacks and for planning to join the conflict in Syria. In total 18 cell members originating in Algeria, Laos and France were convicted in the trial and two were acquitted. Seven of the convicted were associated with the Torcy mosque which was closed for promoting jihadism. Europol classified the attack as religiously inspired terrorism.	0 (+1 attacker)	1
22 May 2013	London, United Kingdom	Murder of Lee Rigby	An off-duty British soldier, Lee Rigby, was killed by two Islamists outside his barracks in London. The men ran him down with a car, then stabbed and hacked him to death with knives and a cleaver. They stood over the body and spoke to bystanders until police arrived. They charged at police and were shot and arrested. Europol classified the attack as religiously inspired terrorism.	1	0
25 May 2013	La Défense, France	2013 La Défense attack	A French soldier on patrol was stabbed in the neck by a man in La Défense, a business district west of Paris. The attacker fled but was arrested four days later. Europol classified the attack as religiously inspired terrorism. In November 2015, the court declared the attacker not criminally responsible for psychiatric reasons.	0	1

=== 2014 ===
Date	Location	Article	Details	Deaths	Injuries
24 May 2014	Brussels, Belgium	Jewish Museum of Belgium shooting	An attacker opened fire in the Jewish Museum in Brussels, killing four people. On 30 May, Mehdi Nemmouche who in 2013 had fought for Islamists in the Syrian Civil War, was arrested in Marseille and admitted to the shooting. In March 2019, after a two-month-long trial, he was found guilty of four murders. Europol classified the attack as religiously inspired terrorism, and noted that the attack was the first by a returnee from the Syrian Civil War.	4	0
20 December 2014	(France) Joué-lès-Tours, France	2014 Tours police station stabbing	An attacker entered a police station shouting the Islamic takbir Allahu Akbar ("God is Great"), and attacked officers with a knife, injuring three before he was shot dead. Europol classified the attack as religiously inspired terrorism.	0 (+1 attacker)	3
21 December 2014	(France) Dijon, France	2014 Dijon attack	An attacker deliberately drove a van into several groups of pedestrians, injuring 11 before being arrested. He shouted Allahu akbar during the attack and stated he was a "warrior for Islam". According to Europol, the attacker may have been only partly motivated by ideology and suffered from schizophrenia, but was nonetheless inspired by the modus operandi recommended in terrorist propaganda.	0	11

=== 2015 ===
According to Europol, terrorist attacks attributed to jihadists in the European Union increased from four in 2014 to seventeen in 2015, while the number of people killed increased from four to 150. Non-EU areas of Europe are not included in the Europol figures.

In 2015, the terrorist threat level was zero in Poland, on its scale which has four levels plus the "zero level". About 20-40 Polish nationals had travelled to the conflict zone in Syria-Iraq.

Date	Location	Article	Details	Deaths	Injuries
7–9 January 2015	Île-de-France, France	January 2015 Île-de-France attacks	Terrorist attacks occurred across the Île-de-France region, particularly in Paris. Three attackers killed a total of 17 in four shooting attacks, and police then killed the three assailants. The main attacks were the Charlie Hebdo shooting and the Porte de Vincennes siege. The organization Al-Qaeda in the Arabian Peninsula claimed responsibility and said that the coordinated attacks had been planned for years. Europol classified the attacks as jihadist terrorism.	17 (+3 attackers)	22
3 February 2015	Nice, France	2015 Nice stabbing	Three soldiers, guarding a Jewish community center in Nice, were attacked by a man with a knife. The attacker was arrested by police. Europol classified the attack as jihadist terrorism.	0	3
14–15 February 2015	Copenhagen, Denmark	2015 Copenhagen shootings	A man opened fire at an event at Krudttønden organized by Lars Vilks, known for his controversial drawings of Muhammad. Later, a Jewish man was shot outside the Great Synagogue. The attacker was later shot dead by police. Europol classified the attack as jihadist terrorism.	2 (+1 attacker)	6
26 June 2015	(France) Saint-Quentin-Fallavier, France	Saint-Quentin-Fallavier attack	An attacker beheaded his employer, impaled his head on a fence, and then blew up gas cylinders at a factory by ramming his van into them. The attacker was arrested, but committed suicide by hanging himself in his cell later the same year. Europol classified the attack as jihadist terrorism.	1	2
21 August 2015	Oignies, France	2015 Thalys train attack	A man threatened passengers with an assault rifle on a Thalys train between Amsterdam and Paris. One passenger was shot in the neck with a pistol when the rifle jammed. Two United States military personnel and their civilian friend overcame the attacker. Europol classified the attack as jihadist terrorism.	0	3 (+1 attacker)
17 September 2015	Berlin, Germany	Rafik Yousef	A policewoman was critically injured after being stabbed by a man, who was then shot dead by another officer. The attacker, a 41-year-old Iraqi national, was an Islamist who had previously been sent to prison for planning an attack in 2004 against the then Iraqi prime minister, Ayad Allawi. Europol classified the attack as jihadist terrorism.	0 (+1 attacker)	1
13–14 November 2015	Paris and Saint-Denis, France	November 2015 Paris attacks	A series of co-ordinated attacks began over about 35 minutes at six locations in central Paris. The first shooting attack occurred in a restaurant and a bar in the 10th arrondissement of Paris. There was shooting and a bomb detonated at Bataclan theatre in the 11th arrondissement during a concert by the Eagles of Death Metal. Approximately 100 hostages were then taken and overall 89 were killed there. Other bombings took place outside the Stade de France stadium in the suburb of Saint-Denis during a football match between France and Germany. Europol classified the attacks as jihadist terrorism.	130 (+7 attackers)	413

=== 2016 ===
In 2016, a total of 135 people were killed in ten completed jihadist attacks in the European Union, according to Europol figures, while 62 others were killed in Turkey and one in Russia. Thirteen attacks were attempted. The number of arrests increased on the previous year, to 718. In France, the number of arrests increased from 377 in 2015 to 429 in 2016. One in four (26%) of those arrested in 2016 were women, an increase from 18% the previous year. The threat in 2016 consisted of remotely directed individuals operating alone or in small groups. In addition to these, there were those that were inspired by propaganda but not instructed or directed.

Date	Location	Article	Details	Deaths	Injuries
7 January 2016	Paris, France	January 2016 Paris police station attack	An asylum seeker wielding a knife and a fake bomb vest shouted "Allahu Akbar" outside a police station. He was shot dead by police as he tried to force his way in. Europol classified the attack as jihadist terrorism.	0 (+1 attacker)	1
11 January 2016	Marseille, France	–	A 15-year-old Turkish boy, claiming to be "acting in the name of ISIL," attempted to behead a teacher from a Jewish school with a machete. Europol classified the attack as jihadist terrorism.	0	1
12 January 2016	Istanbul, Turkey	January 2016 Istanbul bombing	A suicide bomber blew himself up in the Sultan Ahmed Mosque district in Istanbul, killing 13 people and wounding another 9, most of whom were foreign tourists. No group claimed responsibility, but Turkish authorities suspected ISIL. Europol classified the attack as jihadist terrorism.	13 (+1 attacker)	9
26 February 2016	Hanover, Germany	Hanover stabbing	A police officer was critically injured in a stabbing attack by a 15-year-old girl. Europol classified the attack as jihadist terrorism.	0	1
19 March 2016	Istanbul, Turkey	March 2016 Istanbul bombing	A suicide bombing took place in Istanbul's Beyoğlu district in front of the district governor's office. The attack occurred at 10:55 (EET) at the intersection of Balo Street with İstiklal Avenue, a central shopping street. Europol classified the attack as jihadist terrorism.	4 (+1 attacker)	36
22 March 2016	Brussels and Zaventem, Belgium	2016 Brussels bombings	Suicide bombers detonated three bombs in Brussels: two at Brussels Airport in Zaventem, and one at Maalbeek metro station. In these attacks, 32 people and the three bombers were killed, and 340 people were injured. Europol classified the attacks as jihadist terrorism.	32 (+3 attackers)	340
13 June 2016	Magnanville, France	2016 Magnanville stabbing	An attacker stabbed and killed a police officer in his home, before taking the officer's wife and son hostage. Police raided the house and killed the attacker and found the officer's wife dead but his son alive. ISIL claimed responsibility. Europol classified the attack as jihadist terrorism.	2 (+1 attacker)	0
28 June 2016	Istanbul, Turkey	2016 Atatürk Airport attack	A terrorist attack, consisting of shootings and suicide bombings, occurred on 28 June 2016 at Atatürk Airport in Istanbul, Turkey. Gunmen armed with automatic weapons and explosive belts staged a simultaneous attack at the international terminal of Terminal 2. Forty-five people were killed, in addition to the three attackers, and more than 230 people were injured. Europol classified the attack as jihadist terrorism.	45 (+3 attackers)	230
14 July 2016	Nice, France	2016 Nice truck attack	A Tunisian man, Mohamed Lahouaiej-Bouhlel, drove a cargo truck into crowds celebrating Bastille Day on the Promenade des Anglais in Nice, resulting in the death of 86 people and injuring 458. The driver was shot dead by police. ISIL claimed the responsibility for the attack. Europol classified the attack as jihadist terrorism.	86 (+1 attacker)	458
18 July 2016	Würzburg, Germany	Würzburg train attack	A 17-year-old Afghan asylum seeker attacked passengers on a train with an axe and a knife. The attacker was killed by police. Europol classified the attack as jihadist terrorism.	0 (+1 attacker)	5
24 July 2016	Ansbach, Germany	2016 Ansbach bombing	A 27-year-old Syrian refugee detonated a bomb at a wine bar after being denied entry to a nearby music festival, killing himself and wounding 15 civilians. Authorities found a recorded video message on the attacker's phone, pledging his allegiance to ISIL. Europol classified the attack as jihadist terrorism. The Ansbach bombing was the first suicide bombing in Germany by Islamist terrorists.	0 (+1 attacker)	15
26 July 2016	(France) Saint-Étienne-du-Rouvray, France	2016 Normandy church attack	Two assailants took hostages at a church, killing a priest and seriously wounding another man. The attackers were killed by French Special Forces. ISIL claimed responsibility for the attack. Europol classified the attack as jihadist terrorism.	1 (+2 attackers)	1
6 August 2016	Charleroi, Belgium	2016 stabbing of Charleroi police officers	An Algerian man a wielding a machete and shouting "Allahu Akbar" attacked two policewomen. The assailant was shot and killed by a third officer. Europol classified the attack as jihadist terrorism.	0 (+1 attacker)	2
17 August 2016	Moscow Oblast, Russia	2016 Shchelkovo Highway police station attack	Two men with firearms and axes attacked the police station on the Shchelkovo Highway near Moscow. Two traffic police officers were seriously wounded, one fatally. The attackers, natives of the Chechen Republic, were killed by police during the attack. ISIL claimed responsibility. Europol classified the attack as jihadist terrorism.	1 (+2 attackers)	1
5 October 2016	Brussels, Belgium	2016 stabbing of Brussels police officers	Three police officers were attacked by a man wielding a machete in the Schaerbeek neighborhood of Brussels. Two of them suffered stab wounds, while the third was physically assaulted but otherwise uninjured. Europol classified the attack as jihadist terrorism.	0	3 (+1 attacker)
19 December 2016	Berlin, Germany	2016 Berlin truck attack	A Tunisian man killed a truck driver and stole his vehicle and drove it into a Christmas market in Berlin, killing twelve people and wounding 56 others. Days later, having fled to Italy, the attacker shot an Italian police officer doing a routine check, before being killed by police. ISIL claimed responsibility for the attack. Europol classified the attack as jihadist terrorism. Nearly five years after the attack, a man who was critically injured while giving first aid after the attack died from complications related to his injuries.	12	56

=== 2017 ===
In 2017, a total of 62 people were killed in ten completed jihadist attacks in the European Union, according to Europol figures. The number of attempted jihadist attacks reached 33 in 2017, double that of the previous year. Most of the deaths were in the UK (35), Spain (16), Sweden (5) and France (3). In addition to those killed, a total of 819 people were injured in 14 attacks. The pattern of jihadist attacks in 2017 led Europol to conclude that terrorists preferred to attack ordinary people rather than causing property damage or loss of capital.

According to Europol's annual report on terrorism in the European Union, the jihadist attacks in 2017 had three patterns: indiscriminate killings (London attacks in March and June and Barcelona attacks), attacks on Western lifestyle (the Manchester bombing in May 2017, 2017 Istanbul nightclub shooting), and attacks on symbols of authority (Paris attacks in February, June and August). The agency's report also noted that jihadist attacks had caused more deaths and casualties than any other type of terrorist attack, that such attacks had become more frequent, and that there had been a decrease in the sophistication and preparation of the attacks.

In 2017, a total of 705 individuals were arrested in 18 EU Member states, 373 of those in France. Most arrests were on suspicion of membership in a terrorist organisation (354), suspicion of planning (120), or of preparing (112) a terrorist attack.

Date	Location	Article	Details	Deaths	Injuries
1 January 2017	Istanbul, Turkey	2017 Istanbul nightclub shooting	A mass shooting occurred at a nightclub in the Beşiktaş district of Istanbul, Turkey, on 1 January 2017. The attack occurred at about 01:15 FET (UTC+3) at the Reina nightclub in Ortaköy, where hundreds of people were celebrating the New Year. At least 39 people were killed and at least 70 were injured in the incident. The gunman was arrested in the city on 17 January 2017, and ISIL claimed credit for his actions. Europol classified the attack as jihadist terrorism.	39	70
22 March 2017	London, United Kingdom	2017 Westminster attack	A 52-year-old Muslim convert drove a car into pedestrians on Westminster Bridge, killing four and injuring over 40 others. He then crashed his car into the fence of the Palace of Westminster and fatally stabbed an unarmed policeman before being shot dead by other officers. Europol classified the attack as jihadist terrorism.	5 (+1 attacker)	50
3 April 2017	Saint Petersburg, Russia	2017 Saint Petersburg Metro bombing	A suicide bomber blew himself up on the St Petersburg Metro, on the day Vladimir Putin was due to visit the city. Sixteen people were killed, including the bomber, and 64 others were injured. Imam Shamil Battalion, an Al-Qaeda affiliate, claimed responsibility, but according to the FSB, the attacker acted on the orders of a field commander from ISIL. Europol classified the attack as jihadist terrorism.	15 (+1 attacker)	64
7 April 2017	Stockholm, Sweden	2017 Stockholm truck attack	An attacker used a truck to run over pedestrians along a shopping street before crashing into a department store. Five people were killed and 14 others wounded. Police said the attacker, an Uzbek immigrant, had shown sympathies for extremist organizations including ISIL. He was sentenced to life in prison and lifetime expulsion from Sweden in June 2018. Europol classified the attack as jihadist terrorism.	5	14
20 April 2017	Paris, France	April 2017 Champs-Élysées attack	Three police officers and a bystander were shot by an attacker wielding an AK-47 rifle on the Champs-Élysées, a shopping boulevard in Paris. One of the policeman was killed. The attacker was shot dead during the incident. He had a note defending ISIL, and had previously attempted to communicate with ISIL fighters in Iraq and Syria. Europol classified the attack as jihadist terrorism.	1 (+ 1 attacker)	3
22 May 2017	Manchester, United Kingdom	Manchester Arena bombing	A suicide bombing was carried out by Salman Ramadan Abedi, a 22-year-old British Muslim of Libyan ancestry, at Manchester Arena after a concert by American singer Ariana Grande, killing 22 civilians. Europol classified the attack as jihadist terrorism.	22 (+1 attacker)	512
3 June 2017	London, United Kingdom	2017 London Bridge attack	Three assailants used a van to ram pedestrians on London Bridge and then drove to Borough Market, where the three attacked people with knives before being shot by police. Eight people were killed and 48 were injured. The injured included four unarmed police officers. Europol classified the attack as jihadist terrorism.	8 (+3 attackers)	48
6 June 2017	Paris, France	2017 Notre Dame attack	An Algerian PhD student, who prosecutors allege had pledged allegiance to ISIL in a video, was arrested for using a hammer to attack an officer guarding Notre Dame de Paris. Knives were later found in his rucksack. Europol classified the attack as jihadist terrorism.	0	1 (+1 attacker)
19 June 2017	Paris, France	June 2017 Champs-Élysées car ramming attack	An attacker used a car loaded with guns and explosives to ram a Gendarmerie vehicle on the Champs-Élysées in Paris, France. The attacker was shot and killed by police. He had pledged his allegiance to ISIL and stated the attack should be treated as a "martyrdom operation." Europol classified the attack as jihadist terrorism.	0 (+ 1 attacker)	0
20 June 2017	Brussels, Belgium	June 2017 Brussels attack	A Moroccan immigrant ran into the Brussels Central Station where he detonated a small bomb which caused no injuries. The perpetrator then ran towards soldiers in another part of the station, and was shot and killed. The attack failed. Europol classified the attack as jihadist terrorism.	0 (+1 attacker)	0
28 July 2017	Hamburg, Germany	2017 Hamburg attack	A 26-year-old Palestinian failed asylum seeker stabbed seven people with a 20 cm-long kitchen knife: one was killed and the other six were injured. In March 2018, he was sentenced to life in prison. The attacker said that "he would die as a martyr" and that "his aim was to kill as many Germans as possible to avenge Muslim suffering worldwide". Europol classified the attack as jihadist terrorism.	1	6 (+1 attacker)
9 August 2017	Levallois-Perret, France	Levallois-Perret attack	An attacker drove a car into a group of around dozen soldiers taking part in Opération Sentinelle, injuring six. The prosecutor said the suspect had shown interest in ISIL. Europol classified the attack as jihadist terrorism.	0	6 (+1 attacker)
16–21 August 2017	Barcelona and Cambril, Catalonia, Spain	2017 Barcelona attacks	On 16 August 2017 two suspects were killed in an initial accidental explosion during the preparation of explosives that were to be used in the attack in Alcanar. 16 were injured when another bomb accidentally exploded during the excavation of the site. On 17 August 2017, a van was driven into pedestrians in Las Ramblas, Barcelona, killing 14 and injuring at least 130. Two suspects then fled on foot, stabbing another civilian to death in the process. The following day, a woman was killed in a related attack in Cambrils when a car tried to run into pedestrians and attackers stabbed people. A policeman shot and killed four of the five attackers while the fifth died later of his injuries. On 21 August, the suspected driver of the Ramblas van attack was shot and killed by police in Subirats. ISIL claimed responsibility for the Ramblas attack. Europol classified the attack as jihadist terrorism.	16 (+8 attackers)	152
18 August 2017	Turku, Finland	2017 Turku stabbing	Two civilians were killed and eight others were injured by a man who said he was inspired by ISIL. During interrogation, the attacker said that he began watching ISIL propaganda three months before the attack. Police believed he acted alone and said there was no evidence of contact with any terrorist organization. The attacker said that a motive for his attack was airstrikes by the Western Coalition during the 2017 Battle of Raqqa in Syria. According to the NBI, his vision was that he would die in the attack as a martyr. In June 2018, the attacker was convicted of two counts of murder with terrorist intent and eight counts of attempted murder with terrorist intent and sentenced to life in prison. Europol classified the attack as jihadist terrorism.	2	8 (+1 attacker)
25 August 2017	Brussels, Belgium	August 2017 Brussels attack	In Brussels on Boulevard Emile Jacqmain, a machete-wielding Somali man was shot dead after attacking two soldiers. One soldier was wounded. Europol classified the incident as jihadist terrorism.	0 (+1 attacker)	1
15 September 2017	London, United Kingdom	Parsons Green bombing	An attacker placed a bomb containing TATP on a District line train at Parsons Green tube station, it detonated with thirty people treated for injuries. The main suspect arrested was an 18-year old Iraqi refugee. In March 2018, he was convicted of attempted murder and sentenced to life in prison. Europol classified the attack as jihadist terrorism.	0	30
1 October 2017	Marseille, France	Marseille stabbing	Two women, 20 and 21-year-old cousins, were attacked by an illegal immigrant from Tunisia using a knife. Patrolling soldiers shot him dead at the scene. ISIL later claimed responsibility, a claim which French intelligence services described as "opportunistic". However, the attacker's brother was an Islamic State militant who fought in Syria, and was held in suspicion of complicity in the attack. The prosecutor opened an investigation for "murder in connection with a terrorist enterprise". Europol classified the attack as jihadist terrorism.	2 (+1 attacker)	0

=== 2018 ===
In 2018, a total of 13 people were killed and 46 were injured in seven completed jihadist attacks in the European Union, according to Europol figures. The number of attempted jihadist attacks was 24, down from 33 the previous year. All attacks were carried out by perpetrators acting alone. Europol noted in its 2019 report that generally, individuals who act alone seldom do so in total isolation as attackers often maintain relations in small or loosely defined networks and may receive moral or material support from individuals sharing their ideas. A number of the stopped attacks involved groups of perpetrators. The year saw equal numbers of EU citizens and non-EU citizens carrying out attacks. All attackers were male and their average age was 26.

Date	Location	Article	Details	Deaths	Injuries
23 March 2018	Carcassonne and Trèbes, France	Carcassonne and Trèbes attack	A 26-year-old Moroccan man who pledged allegiance to ISIL made an attack in the French towns of Carcassonne and Trèbes: he attacked and stole a car, killing a passenger and wounding the driver, in Carcassonne. Later he arrived in Trèbes where a police officer was injured when he was shot by the attacker. Then, he attacked a supermarket, where two civilians and a policeman were killed and several people were injured. The attacker was later killed by the police. Europol classified the attack as jihadist terrorism.	4 (+1 attacker)	15
5 May 2018	The Hague, Netherlands	–	A 31-year-old man from The Hague stabbed and seriously hurt three people near train station Hollands Spoor in the city on Saturday afternoon. The police shot the suspect in the leg before arresting him. Europol classified the attack as jihadist terrorism.	0	3 (+1 attacker)
12 May 2018	Paris, France	2018 Paris knife attack	A 21-year-old Franco-Chechen man stabbed one pedestrian to death and injured four others in Paris, France. The attacker was later killed by police. The suspect had been on a counter-terrorism watchlist since 2016. Amaq News Agency posted a video of a hooded figure pledging allegiance to ISIL leader Abu Bakr al-Baghdadi. Amaq claimed this figure was the attacker. Europol classified the attack as jihadist terrorism.	1 (+1 attacker)	4
29 May 2018	Liège, Belgium	2018 Liège attack	A man on temporary leave from prison stabbed and then shot two police officers, killing them. He then shot dead a civilian. The gunman took a woman hostage and wounded four others before he was killed by police. He is also believed to have killed a man the day before the attack. Europol classified the attack as jihadist terrorism.	4 (+1 attacker)	4
31 August 2018	Amsterdam, Netherlands	2018 Amsterdam stabbing attack	A 19-year-old Afghan male asylum seeker stabbed and injured two Americans in Amsterdam Centraal station. The attacker was then shot by a police officer. Europol classified the attack as jihadist terrorism.	0	2 (+1 attacker)
11 December 2018	Strasbourg, France	2018 Strasbourg attack	A French citizen with Algerian ancestry attacked people at a Christmas market in Strasbourg with a gun and a knife, killing five civilians and wounding eleven others. The man was killed two days later by police. Europol classified the attack as jihadist terrorism.	5	11
31 December 2018	Manchester, United Kingdom	Manchester Victoria stabbing attack	A 25-year-old man with Somali ancestry stabbed three people at Manchester Victoria station before being arrested. Europol classified the attack as jihadist terrorism.	0	3

=== 2019 ===
In 2019, a total of ten people were killed in three completed jihadist attacks in the European Union, according to Europol figures. An additional four attacks failed and 14 were foiled. All completed and failed attacks except for one were carried out by perpetrators acting alone, whereas most of the foiled plots involved more than one person.

Date	Location	Article	Details	Deaths	Injuries
18 March 2019	Utrecht, Netherlands	Utrecht tram shooting	A 37-year-old man shot passengers aboard a tram, killing four and seriously wounding two. He was convicted of murder with a terrorist motive in March 2020 and sentenced to life imprisonment. Europol classified the attack as jihadist terrorism.	4	2
24 May 2019	Lyon, France	2019 Lyon bombing	A 23-year-old man detonated an explosive device in a pedestrian zone, injuring thirteen people. Europol classified the attack as jihadist terrorism.	0	13
17 September 2019	Milan, Italy		A 23-year-old Yemeni irregular immigrant stabbed an Italian soldier in the neck and in the back with a pair of scissors at the Milan Central Station. Other soldiers and a Senegalese who happened to pass by intervened. The soldier survived the attack. Europol classified the attack as jihadist terrorism.	0	1
3 October 2019	Paris, France	Paris police headquarters stabbing	A police employee stabbed six of his coworkers, killing four of them, before being shot dead. Europol classified the attack as jihadist terrorism.	4 (+1 attacker)	2
29 November 2019	London, United Kingdom	2019 London Bridge stabbing	A 28-year-old man who had previously been convicted of terrorist crimes stabbed people in central London, killing two and wounding three others, before being shot dead by police. Europol classified the attack as jihadist terrorism.	2 (+1 attacker)	3

=== 2020 ===
In 2020, a total of twelve people were killed in ten completed jihadist attacks in the European Union, with an additional three people killed in three additional completed jihadist attacks in the United Kingdom, according to Europol figures. All attackers were men between the ages of 18 and 33, and all were lone actors. Of the attackers, five had come to the EU as asylum seekers or illegal immigrants. At least five of the attacks involved assailants who were either convicts or had been released from prison sentences. In addition to the completed attacks there were two attempted attacks that were thwarted and Switzerland recorded two attacks involving probable jihadist motivation.

Date	Location	Article	Details	Deaths	Injuries
3 January 2020	Paris, France	Attentat du 3 janvier 2020 à Villejuif	A 22-year-old Frenchman who had converted to Islam stabbed 3 people in a park, killing one of them, before being shot and killed by police. Europol classified the attack as jihadist terrorism.	1 (+1 attacker)	2
9 January 2020	Whitemoor Prison, United Kingdom	–	Two prison inmates used improvised weapons to stab prison employees. Europol classified the attack as jihadist terrorism.	0	several
2 February	London, United Kingdom	2020 Streatham stabbing	A 20-year-old man who had recently been released from prison stabbed two people in public, before being shot and killed by police. Europol classified the attack as jihadist terrorism.	0 (+1 attacker)	2
4 April 2020	Romans-sur-Isère, France	2020 Romans-sur-Isère knife attack	A 33-year-old Sudanese male refugee stabbed seven people across multiple locations, killing two of them, before being arrested by police. Europol classified the attack as jihadist terrorism.	2	5
27 April 2020	Colombes, France	Attaque du 27 avril 2020 à Colombes	29-year-old French man Youssef Tihlah rammed two police officers with his vehicle. Europol classified the attack as jihadist terrorism.	0	2
27 April 2020	Waldkraiburg, Germany	–	A 25-year-old German man of Kurdish descent set fire to a Turkish-owned fruit and vegetable store during the night, injuring six people who lived in the building. After his arrest, police found ten pipe bombs and several kilos of explosives. The attacker planned to attack Turkish-run mosques organised by the DİTİB, the German branch of the Turkish agency for religion Diyanet. Europol classified the attack as jihadist terrorism.	0	6
20 June 2020	Reading, United Kingdom	2020 Reading stabbings	A 25-year-old male Libyan refugee killed three men and wounded three others by stabbing, in Forbury Gardens before being arrested by police. He was sentenced to a whole life prison sentence; the sentencing judge said that the purpose of the terrorist attack had been to advance an extremist Islamic cause. Europol classified the attack as jihadist terrorism.	3	3
18 August 2020	Berlin, Germany	Amokfahrt auf der Berliner Stadtautobahn	A 30-year-old Iraqi male asylum seeker rammed into cars on the A100 highway in Berlin, wounding six people. Three wounded were motorcyclists who were gravely injured. Europol classified the attack as jihadist terrorism.	0	6
25 September 2020	Paris, France	2020 Paris stabbing attack	A 25-year-old man stabbed two people outside the former headquarters of the satirical magazine Charlie Hebdo. The building is now used by a television production company, and the two wounded victims were workers of the company. Europol classified the attack as jihadist terrorism.	0	2
4 October 2020	Dresden, Germany	2020 Dresden knife attack	A 20-year-old Syrian man selected a gay couple as symbols of non-belief and stabbed them, killing one and wounding the other. The attacker was later arrested after his DNA traces were found on the knife. The attacker had served a sentence for supporting a terrorist organization and planning an attack; he had been released in September 2020. Europol classified the attack as jihadist terrorism.	1	1
16 October 2020	Conflans-Sainte-Honorine, France	Murder of Samuel Paty	An 18-year-old man beheaded a teacher near a school in a suburb of Paris, before being shot dead by police. The victim is said to have shown cartoons of the Islamic prophet Muhammad to his students. Europol classified the attack as jihadist terrorism.	1 (+1 attacker)	0
29 October 2020	Nice, France	2020 Nice stabbing	A 21-year-old man stabbed three people to death at Notre-Dame de Nice. The attacker attempted to behead one of the victims, a 60-year-old woman. The attacker, who was shot by the police, was taken into custody. The Mayor of Nice and President Macron said the incident was an Islamist terrorist attack. Europol classified the attack as jihadist terrorism.	3	0 (+1 attacker)
2 November 2020	Vienna, Austria	2020 Vienna attack	A 20-year-old man shot people at random in six locations in central Vienna, killing four and injuring 22, mainly in and outside restaurants, before being shot dead by police. A video of the man pledging allegiance to the Islamic State was released via Amaq News Agency and Europol classified the attack as jihadist terrorism.	4 (+1 attacker)	22

=== 2021 ===
In 2021, two people were killed in three completed jihadist attacks in the European Union, according to Europol figures. An additional eight attacks were foiled.

Date	Location	Article	Details	Deaths	Injuries
23 April 2021	Rambouillet, France	Rambouillet knife attack	A 36-year-old man stabbed a police employee to death at a police station before being killed by police. Europol classified the attack as jihadist terrorism.	1 (+1 attacker)	0
17 September 2021	Murcia, Spain	–	A 27-year-old man rammed a vehicle into a restaurant terrace, killing one person and injuring five. The perpetrator died during the attack. Europol has listed the attack as jihadist terrorism, although the legal classification of the attack as terrorism is still pending in Spain as of July 2022.	1 (+1 attacker)	5
15 October 2021	Leigh-on-Sea, United Kingdom	Murder of David Amess	A 25-year-old man stabbed David Amess, a British Conservative Party politician and Member of Parliament (MP) for Southend West, at his constituency surgery at Belfairs Methodist Church Hall in Leigh-on-Sea, Essex. The attacker was arrested at the scene and was later found guilty of murder and the preparation of terrorist acts. The prosecutor said in court that Ali Harbi Ali considered himself an affiliate of the Islamic State, that he was "inspired by ISIL", and that the attack was planned two years in advance and was related to events in Syria.	1	0
6 November 2021	Neumarkt, Germany	–	A 27-year-old man stabbed five people on board a train before being arrested at the next station. Europol classified the attack as jihadist terrorism.	0	5

=== 2022 ===
In 2022, two people were killed and 21 people were injured in jihadist attacks in Europe.

Date	Location	Article	Details	Deaths	Injuries
25 June 2022	Oslo, Norway	2022 Oslo shooting	Two people were killed and twenty-one people were wounded in a mass shooting in Oslo, Norway. Police declared the incident as an "act of Islamist terrorism". The target may have been the Oslo LGBTQ pride event, which was hosted by the local branch of the Norwegian Organisation for Sexual and Gender Diversity. As of 2026, it is the only terrorist incident linked to the Islamic State to occur in Norway.	2	21

=== 2023 ===
In 2023, four people were killed in three completed jihadist attacks in the European Union, as of December 3.

Date	Location	Article	Details	Deaths	Injuries
13 October 2023	Arras, France	2023 Arras school stabbing	20-year-old Russian national Mohamed Mogouchkov stabbed teacher Dominique Bernard to death and gravely wounded two other teachers at his former school in Arras, before being arrested. President Emmanuel Macron condemned the attack as "barbaric Islamic terrorism.". The prosecutor said that the suspect had pledged allegiance to the Daesh and expressed his hatred for France.	1	2
16 October 2023	Brussels, Belgium	2023 Brussels shooting	A 45-year-old Tunisian man shot dead two Swedish football fans and injured a third north of the Brussels's city centre. The following day he was killed by police while they attempted an arrest. A spokesman for the federal prosecutor's office, said the investigation was centreing on "a possible terrorist motivation for the shooting".	2 (+1 attacker)	1
2 December 2023	France	2023 Paris attack	A French man of Iranian origin carried out a knife and hammer attack against three people in Paris, France, killing one of them. France's Interior Minister said the alleged attacker was heard shouting "Allahu Akbar", and told police he was upset because "so many Muslims are dying in Afghanistan and in Palestine". The suspect had served four years in jail after being convicted for planning another attack in 2016 and was on the French security services watchlist.	1	2

=== 2024 ===
Date	Location	Article	Details	Deaths	Injuries
22 March 2024	Moscow, Russia	Crocus City Hall attack	A mass shooting took place inside the Crocus City Hall in Moscow by a group of Tajik jihadists, who pledged allegiance to ISIS. 145 people were killed. IS claimed responsibility for the attack in a statement through the IS-affiliated Amaq News Agency shortly after the attack, with its regional branch in the Afghanistan–Pakistan border region, Islamic State – Khorasan Province (IS–KP or ISIS-K), most likely being responsible. Amaq also published a video filmed by one of the attackers. It showed the attackers shooting victims and slitting the throat of a victim, while the filming attacker was reciting the takbir, praising God and speaking against infidels.	145	551
31 May 2024	Mannheim, Germany	2024 Mannheim stabbing	A 25-year-old Afghan refugee ambushed and stabbed several people at a rally hosted by the counter-jihad and anti-Islam group Citizens' Movement Pax Europa (BPE) in the market square. He mortally wounded a police officer, who died two days later, and wounded 5 other people. The attack was stopped when the suspect was shot and injured by another police officer. Investigators suspect that the suspect's motive was Islamist in nature.	1	5 (+1 attacker)
23 June 2024	Derbent, Russia	2024 Dagestan attacks	Coordinated attacks were launched in the cities of Derbent and Makhachkala in the Russian republic of Dagestan in the North Caucasus. Two synagogues, two Eastern Orthodox churches, and a traffic police post were attacked simultaneously.	22 (+5 attackers)	45
23 August 2024	Solingen, Germany	2024 Solingen stabbing	A mass stabbing took place during a festival celebrating the 650th anniversary of Solingen, Germany, when a Syrian man armed with a knife killed three people and injured eight others. The motive for the attack, according to authorities, was the suspect's "radical Islamist convictions". The suspect is believed to be a member of Islamic State, which has claimed responsibility for the attack.	3	8
5 September 2024	Munich, Germany	2024 Munich shooting	An 18-year-old gunman opened fire on police after they spotted him wielding a rifle and was subsequently killed without further casualties. Authorities carried out a search of the assailant's house following the shooting. Material is said to have been discovered that suggests jihadist sentiments; he was supporter of the Syrian terrorist group Jabhat al-Nusra.	0 (+ 1 attacker)	0

=== 2025 ===
Date	Location	Article	Details	Deaths	Injuries
15 February 2025	Villach, Austria	2025 Villach stabbing attack	A 14-year-old boy was killed and five others were injured during a stabbing attack before a passing motorist disrupted the attack by ramming the perpetrator. A 23-year-old Syrian man was subsequently arrested by police. An investigation has classified the stabbing as an Islamist terrorist incident. The perpetrator was found to have been inspired by the Islamic State. He was sentenced to life imprisonment in May 2026.	1	6 (+1 attacker)
22 February 2025	Mulhouse, France	2025 Mulhouse stabbing attack	A knife attack at a market in Mulhouse, France, left a 69-year-old Portuguese man dead and several police officers injured. The suspect, who was arrested at the scene, was identified as an Algerian immigrant who had served a prison sentence for a terrorist offence and was under an order to leave the country. French President Emmanuel Macron said that there was no doubt that the stabbing was an "Islamist terrorist attack", while offering his condolences to the family of the victim and saying the nation stood behind them. He reaffirmed his administration's commitment to combating terrorism in France.	1	7
18 May 2025	Bielefeld, Germany	2025 Bielefeld stabbing attack	Five bar patrons were stabbed, some seriously in Bielefeld. The attack occurred in the early hours in the city centre. A 35-year-old Syrian was detained. Investigators found handwritten notes in his room, indicating an intense engagement with a, Salafist interpretation of Islam. The perpetrator admitted to having Islamist motives and was sentenced to life imprisonment in June 2026.	0	6 (+1 attacker)
2 October 2025	Manchester, United Kingdom	2025 Manchester synagogue attack	During the Jewish holiday of Yom Kippur, a man drove a black Kia Picanto into pedestrians before stabbing worshippers at the Heaton Park Hebrew Congregation, a synagogue in Higher Crumpsall, a northern suburb of the city of Manchester in North West England. Three people were killed in the incident, including the attacker and a worshipper who were both shot dead by police. Three other people were injured and treated in hospital; one was hit by the car, one had a stab wound and the third was wounded by police gunfire. The attacker, a 35-year-old British citizen born in Syria, had pledged allegiance to the Islamic State.	2 (+1 attacker)	2

=== 2026 ===
Date	Location	Article	Details	Deaths	Injuries
28 May 2026	Winterthur, Switzerland	2026 Winterthur stabbing attack	A dual Swiss-Turkish national stabbed three people at the Winterthur railway station in Winterthur, in the canton of Zurich in northeastern Switzerland and was arrested at the scene. Police said that the person had been identified in 2015 as having spread propaganda for Islamic State. He had faced criminal charges for spreading ISIS propaganda ten years earlier. The Swiss Attorney General announced that charges had been opened for attempted murder and for supporting a terrorist organisation.	0	3
25 July 2026	Berlin, Germany	2026 Berlin Pride attack	On the evening of 25 July 2026, 21-year-old Abdul Ballout drove a van into a crowd of pedestrians during Berlin Christopher Street Day, a pride celebration in the Tiergarten in central Berlin, Germany. One woman was killed and 29 people were injured, several critically. Ballout fled on foot, and a large-scale manhunt was launched. He was fatally shot the next day by police when they attempted to arrest him. German Interior Minister Alexander Dobrindt described the incident as "an Islamic terrorist attack"	1	29

== List of terrorist plots ==
This is a list of plots which have been classified as terrorism by a law enforcement agency and/or for which at least one person has been convicted of planning one or more terrorist crimes with Islamist motives.

Article	Date	Location	Details
1998 World Cup terror plot	June 1998	France	More than 100 suspected members of the Armed Islamic Group of Algeria (GIA) were arrested across several European nations ahead of the 1998 FIFA World Cup in France. The details of the plot were not disclosed by the law enforcement agencies.
Strasbourg Cathedral bombing plot	31 December 2000	Strasbourg, France	A group of Algerian and French-Algerian men planned to attack Strasbourg Cathedral and the nearby Christmas market on New Year's Eve. They were convicted by a court in Frankfurt for a criminal association with a terrorist enterprise which had links to Islamic networks in Britain, Italy and Spain.
2001 bomb plot in Europe	September 2001	–	An international network of terrorist cells with links to al-Qaeda and plans to bomb one or more U.S.-associated targets in Western Europe was disrupted in 2001.
2002 Strait of Gibraltar terror plot	June 2002	Gibraltar	A number of Saudi nationals were sentenced in 2003 by a Moroccan court for attempting to attack warships in Gibraltar in a plot connected to al Qaeda.
Wood Green ricin plot	2002	London, United Kingdom	In January 2003, a counter-terrorism operation was launched against an al-Qaeda cell planning to use poison for an attack on U.K. streets. An Algerian man was sentenced to 17 years in prison for the plot along with life imprisonment for stabbing a detective to death during his arrest in Manchester.
2006 German train bombing attempts	31 July 2006	Germany	On 31 July 2006, two improvised explosive devices packed in suitcases were placed aboard regional trains. Had the devices functioned as intended, they could have killed around 70 people. The suspects, two Lebanese nationals studying in Germany, were motivated by Jyllands-Posten's publication of Muhammad cartoons and they were caught on CCTV cameras. One of the attackers fled to Lebanon after the attack and the other was sentenced to life in prison by the court in Düsseldorf. Europol classified the plot as Islamist terrorism.
2006 transatlantic aircraft plot	10 August 2006	United Kingdom	10 August 2006 a number of men, predominantly British Pakistanis, were planning to smuggle bomb components aboard transatlantic airliners to assemnble and detonate the bombs while the aircraft were in flight.
Vollsmose terrorist trial	5 September 2006	Denmark	
2006 Prague terror plot	23 September 2006	Czechia	According to the Czech Republic's leading newspaper, Mlada fronta Dnes, Islamist extremists were planning to kidnap and kill Jews in Prague. They intended to take Jews captive in a Prague synagogue, make demands which could not be met and then blow up the building, killing everybody inside. Interior Minister Ivan Langer said the situation was "the most serious ever".
2007 bomb plot in Germany	4 September 2007	Germany	In March 2010, four men, two German converts to Islam, one Turk and one Turk-German were sentenced for having planned bomb attacks against US soldiers. According to the judge, "the four Islamists wanted to create a bloodbath due to religious blindness".
2007 bomb plot in Copenhagen	2007	Copenhagen, Denmark	Two men, one a Danish citizen born in Pakistan and the other an Afghan citizen living in Denmark were sentenced to twelve and seven years in prison, respectively, for planning a terrorist attack. The prosecution alleged that the men had been in contact with al-Qaeda and that one of them had been at a training camp in Waziristan.
2007 plot to behead a British Muslim soldier	2007	Birmingham, United Kingdom	In February 2008, a man with extreme Islamist views was jailed for life along with four other members of the terrorist cell, The plot involved beheading a British soldier with the help of drug dealers in Birmingham.
2008 Barcelona terror plot	2008	Barcelona, Spain	In October 2009, ten Pakistanis and one Indian, a group adhering to extremist Islamist ideology, were convicted by the Audiencia Nacional for possessing explosives and belonging to a terrorist group. Having connections to al-Qaeda and the Taliban, they had intended to plant explosives on the Barcelona Metro as the first of a series of attacks.
2010 European terror plot	2010	(United Kingdom) (France) (Germany)	
2010 Norway terror plot	2010	Norway	Oslo District Court convicted two men for plotting an attack against Danish newspaper Jyllands-Posten offices in Aarhus and Copenhagen with support from al-Qaeda.
2010 Copenhagen terror plot	2010	Copenhagen, Denmark	Lebanese-born Swedish citizen Munir Awad, a Swedish-Egyptian and two Tunisian citizens were arrested when plotting to commit, what police described as a "Mumbai-style attack" at the Jyllands-Posten office because of the Muhammad cartoons. They received 12-year prison sentences for terrorist offences in 2012.
Hotel Jørgensen explosion	10 September 2010	Copenhagen, Denmark	On 10 September 2010, a small explosion took place at Hotel Jørgensen in Copenhagen, Denmark. The only injured person was the one-legged bomber Chechnyan-Belgian Lors Doukaiev who was caught nearby. Investigations showed that Doukaiev had hidden bomb manuals and jihad videos at the home of an acquaintance. The court found that he had planned to attack the newspaper which had published the Muhammad cartoons.
2014 Norway terror threat	24–31 July 2014	Norway	The Norwegian Police Security Service said on 24 July 2014 that there was an imminent threat of an attack by people linked to Islamists in Syria. Security measures were introduced for a week until the threat was deemed reduced.
2015 Kundby bomb plot	2015	Kundby, Denmark	A 17-year-old girl planned to attack a school in Fårevejle Stationsby and a private Jewish school in Copenhagen, the attack was scheduled to take place in early 2016, using home-made bombs. In May 2017, she was tried and found guilty in the district court (Danish: byret) of Holbæk and was sentenced to six years in jail. She appealed the verdict and was tried by the Østre Landsret which found her guilty of planning to carry out terrorism with jihadist motive.
Rawti Shax	Autumn 2015	Italy	In autumn 2015 security police in Italy dismantled a terrorist cell in Trento. Its spiritual leader was Mullah Krekar who was later extradited from Norway. Following appeal, Rahim Karim Twana and Hamasalih Wahab Awat were each sentenced to nine years in prison. Abdul Rahman Rahim Zana, Jalal Fatah Kamil and Hamad Bakr were sentenced to seven and a half years each in prison. Krekar was sentenced to 12 years in prison.
2016 Düsseldorf terrorism plot	2 June 2016	Düsseldorf, Germany	Four migrants were arrested on suspicions of being part of a cell of up to ten ISIL terrorists from Syria who had planned to launch attacks in Düsseldorf similar to the November 2015 Paris attack. Europol classified the plot as jihadist terrorism.
2016 Balkans terrorism plot	17 November 2016	Kosovo, (North Macedonia) Republic of Macedonia and Albania	18 people were arrested over ten days across Kosovo, Macedonia and Albania, after a suspected plot to attack the Israeli national football team and Israeli supporters during an Albania-Israel match. Kosovo police said the attack was planned by Islamic terrorists.
2016 Ludwigshafen bombing plot	26 November 2016 5 December 2016	Ludwigshafen, Germany	A 12-year-old German-Iraqi boy was directed by a 19-year-old ISIL supporter to build nail bombs. One bomb was planted at the local Christmas market on 26 November and another near a shopping centre on 5 December; both failed to detonate. The 19-year-old along with a 15-year-old girl to whom he was married according to Islamic law also planned an attack against USAF Ramstein Air Base. The 19-year-old was declared guilty of membership in a terrorist organisation and directing a terrorist attack and sentenced to 9 years in prison by a court in Vienna.
2016 Copenhagen terror plot	November 2016	Copenhagen, Denmark	A 19-year-old Syrian refugee who had arrived in Germany in 2015 and had subsequently been radicalized took part in plans to plant bombs in Copenhagen. In November 2016 he was apprehended while attempting to enter Denmark with matches, batteries and radios under instruction from an accomplice. In court he maintained he was only a courier to deliver materials to his accomplice in Denmark, while authorities said that the facts that he had not bought a return ticket and had written what were interpreted as farewell letters in his phone pointed towards him having planned to participate in the attacks. He was found to be an IS-sympathizer and to have planned mass murder as part of political violence (German: "schwerer staatsgefährdender Gewalt"). The accused, by then 21 years old, was sentenced by Ravensburger Landgericht in June 2017 to more than six years in prison. In April 2019, his accomplice, a 32-year-old Syrian refugee living in Malmö, Sweden, was sentenced to 12 years in prison for having planned to plant bombs and to attack people with knives in Copenhagen on behalf of the Islamic State.
2018 Cologne terrorist plot	13 June 2018	Germany	A Tunisian man was convicted for attempting to use a biochemical weapon to conduct a terrorist attack in the name of the Islamic State. He had previously twice tried to join the Islamic State unsuccessfully. In March 2020 he was sentenced to 10 years in prison. In June 2020, Oberlandesgericht Düsseldorf found the man's wife guilty of preparing a bombing alongside her husband in order to kill "infidels".
2024 Vienna terrorism plot	8–10 August 2024	Austria	A terrorist plot targeting a concert of the American singer-songwriter Taylor Swift's The Eras Tour at the Ernst-Happel-Stadion in Vienna, the capital city of Austria. Three males, aged 17, 18 and 19, were arrested for involvement in the plot that was intended to mass murder concert attendees as well as onlookers in the stadium vicinity.

== Responses to terrorism ==
Arrests for suspicion of jihadist-related terrorist offences
in the European Union 2006–2020
Europol annual number of arrests. TE SAT reports 2008, 2010, 2014,
2016, 2017, 2018, 2019, 2020, 2022.

According to Europol, the number of people arrested on suspicion of jihadist-related terrorist offences in the European Union increased from 395 in 2014 to 687 in 2015.

In 2015, most arrests were made in France (377), followed by Spain (75) and Belgium (60); statistics for the United Kingdom were not available. During 2015, jihadist terrorism related verdicts were 198 out of a total of 527 terrorism related verdicts. The average sentence for jihadist terrorism increased from 4 years in 2014 to 6 years. In Austria, Belgium, Denmark and Sweden, all terrorism verdicts concerned jihadist terrorism.

In 2016, a total of 718 people were arrested on suspicion of jihadist-related terrorist offences in the European Union. During 2016, 358 verdicts on jihadi terrorism were delivered by courts in the EU, the vast majority of all terrorism verdicts. Belgium had the highest number of such verdicts at 138. All terrorism verdicts in Austria, Belgium, Estonia, Finland, France, Italy, Portugal and Sweden related to jihadist terrorism. Of those convicted for jihadist terrorist offences, 22 were women, such offences were punished with an average sentence of 5 years in prison.

After the vehicle-ramming attack, European countries began equipping pedestrian areas with barriers.

In 2017, the total number of arrests was 705. During 2017, 352 verdicts on jihadi terrorism were delivered by courts in the EU, this was the vast majority of all terrorist convictions (569). The average sentence remained at 5 years in prison. The country with the highest number of jihadist convictions was France with 114.

In 2017, according to Gilles de Kerchove, the European Union's Counter-terrorism Coordinator, the United Kingdom had the highest number of known Islamist radicals of any European country at around 20 to 25 thousand. de Kerchove said that three thousand of those were considered a direct threat by MI5 and 500 were under constant surveillance.

A number of European countries—Austria, Belgium, Denmark, France, the Netherlands, and the United Kingdom—made legal changes which enable deprivation of citizenship of individuals engaged in terrorism if they have dual citizenship.

Article	Date	Location
Opération Sentinelle	12 January 2015 – ongoing	France
2015 anti-terrorism operations in Belgium	15 January 2015	Verviers, Belgium
2015 Saint-Denis raid	17–18 November 2015	Saint-Denis, France
2016 Brussels police raids	15–18 March 2016	Brussels, Belgium
2017 St. Petersburg raid	13–14 December 2017	Saint Petersburg, Russia

== See also ==
- Terrorism
- Islam and violence
- List of terrorist incidents linked to ISIL
- Stabbing as a terrorist tactic
- Vehicle-ramming attack
