= 2023 Danish terror plot =

On 14 December 2023, Danish police arrested three people and charged a further four in absensia for conspiring to commit a terrorist attack in Denmark. One of the four was arrested in the Netherlands, but released. Five out of Denmark's 15 police departments took part in the operation. (Note: These were the departments of Copenhagen, Vestegnen, East Jutland, Funen, and Middle and West Jutland.) The three arrested in Denmark, two men and a younger woman, were put before preliminary questioning at around 7 pm. The judge ruled to give the defendants name protection and for the case to take place behind so-called "double closed doors", meaning the public will be restrained from access. The plot has been linked to the Danish gang Loyal to Familia.

== Background ==
In March 2023, the PET released its annual report on the threat of terrorism against Denmark, emphasising the threat of religious terrorism as well as increased political polarization leading to conspiracy theories becoming more normal, while the Centre for Terror Analysis (Center for Terroranalyse, CTA), stated that the Danish terror threat remained "severe". The day before the arrests, the PET had released another report, stating that the terror threat level had increased due to the outbreak of the Gaza war in October.

== Arrests ==
Copenhagen Police and the Danish Security and Intelligence Service published a press release, calling for a press conference to be held at 1 pm due to the arrest of individuals for "suspicion of preparation for a terrorist attack". Before the press conference, the chairmen of the political parties in the Folketing as well as members of the Jewish community were briefed on the situation, with Danish prime minister Mette Frederiksen stating, "This is as serious as it gets". Police increased its presence in the Danish capital Copenhagen with special attention towards Jewish sites. Israeli prime minister Benjamin Netanyahu claimed that several persons "operat[ing] on behalf of" the Palestinian political and military organisation Hamas were involved in the plot. On the same day, four Hamas members were arrested in Germany as well as a 57-year old man from Rotterdam, the Netherlands. With initial speculation of a potential link, the PET stated that there was no "direct connection" between the three arrests in Denmark and those in Germany, while the 57-year old was "not identical" to the person arrested in the Netherlands in the Danish case.

At least one arrest was carried out in the Aarhus neighbourhood of Gellerup. Coincidentally, a major police evacuation of Aarhus Central Station, the biggest railway station in Jutland, unfolded during the day, sparking initial speculation of causation, but turned out to be non-related.

== Suspects ==
One of the men was arrested at 05:01 while the young woman was arrested at 05:05. Apart from the three arrested, four others were charged in absentia. On 15 December, one of those four, a young woman from Odense, was arrested after landing in Copenhagen following a charter holiday in Southern Europe. Three people remain at large. The one man arrested in the Netherlands was released.

== See also ==
- 2015 Copenhagen shootings
- 2015 Kundby bomb plot
- 2022 Copenhagen mall shooting
- 2023 Kirkerup child abduction
- List of terrorist incidents in Denmark
- Terrorism in Denmark
