= Kundby =

- Town
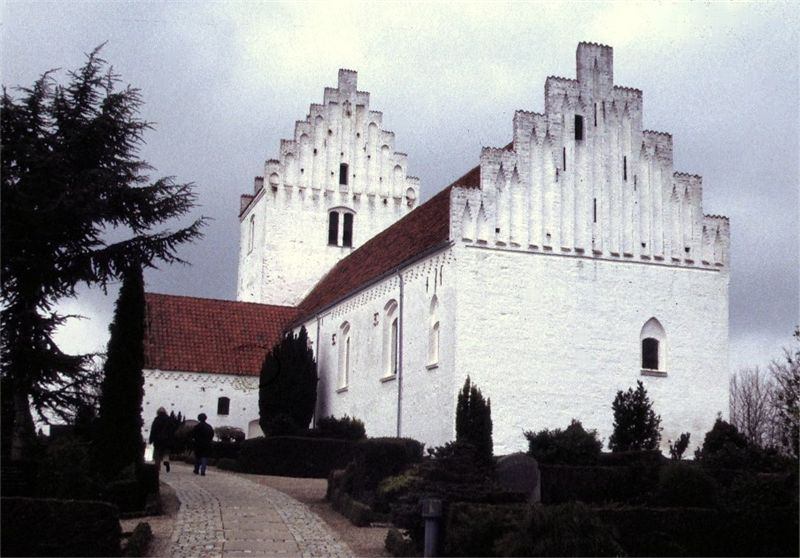
- Kundby Church

- Location in Region Zealand Kundby (Denmark)
- Coordinates: 55°42′39″N 11°31′22″E
- Country: Denmark
- Region: Region Zealand
- Municipality: Holbæk Municipality

Population (2026)
  - Total: 682
- Time zone: UTC+1 (CET)
  - Summer (DST): UTC+2 (CEST)

Kundby is a small town, with a population of 682 (1 January 2026), located in Holbæk Municipality on the northwestern part of Zealand in Region Zealand, Denmark. It is located within Kundby Church District (sogn) four km south of Gislinge and 15 km west of Holbæk. In 2016, the town became well known for being the planning site of an unsuccessful terrorist attack.

== Kundby bomb plot ==
In January 2016, a 15-year-old girl from Kundby was arrested for having tried to build a bomb in order to blow up two schools. The girl had converted to Islam and become an enthusiastic supporter of holy war (jihad) and of the militant Islamist group ISIS. The police found chemicals to create a bomb in her home in Kundby. She became known as the Kundby girl (Danish: Kundby-pigen) with her true naming being Natascha Colding-Olsen. In November 2017, after legal proceedings, she received her final sentence of eight years in prison on account of planning of terrorism and physical violence (legemsangreb) for stabbing a pedagogue.

== Notable people ==
- Christian Christensen (1926 in Kundby – 2005) a Danish professional middleweight boxer, took part in the 1948 Summer Olympics
- Natascha Colding-Olsen (b. 2001) a Danish convicted Islamic terrorist

== See also ==
- 2015 Kundby bomb plot
- Terrorism in Europe
- Islamic terrorism in Europe
- List of terrorist incidents in Denmark
