= Antisemitism during the Gaza war =

During the Gaza war, there has been an observed increase in antisemitic incidents worldwide. In the United States, organizations opposed to antisemitism, including Anti-Defamation League and the American Jewish Committee, reported that the total incidence of antisemitic occurrences increased significantly. Organizations in Western European countries, such as the UK's Community Security Trust and France's Service de Protection de la Communauté Juive (SPCJ), reported similar increases. There have been widely reported individual acts of violence against Jews around the world since the Gaza war began. Among the most significant events were the 2023 antisemitic riots in the North Caucasus, the 2024 Dagestan attacks, the fatal 2025 Manchester synagogue attack, the 2025 Bondi Beach shooting and the 2026 London antisemitic attacks, including the 2026 Golders Green attack.

The distinction between antisemitism—hostility, prejudice, or discrimination against Jews—and anti-Zionism—opposition to Zionism—has been disputed. Israeli leaders and supporters of Israel have frequently accused their perceived opponents of antisemitism. Critics of these characterizations—including scholars, journalists, and activists—have described them as exploiting the accusation of antisemitism to silence criticism of Israel. The line between the two categories is hard to define, as there can be significant overlap between them.

== International ==
Accusations that Israel is committing genocide in the Gaza strip have increased since the war began, with human rights organizations Amnesty International and Human Rights Watch both accusing Israel of genocide in late 2024. Some commentators have said that such accusations can be antisemitic. The novelist and historian of antisemitism Dara Horn said that there has been a proliferation of "fact-resistant slogans that demonize Jews" since October 7 across America, offering the example of "Genocide supporters!". Horn called these accusations "recycled from medieval blood libels and KGB talking points". Genocide accusations have been criticized in strong terms as a kind of "blood libel".

Among the anti-Israel incidents which Israel or its supporters have accused of antisemitism are the Gaza war protests, South Africa's genocide case against Israel at the International Court of Justice, and Greta Thunberg's participation in attempts to break Israel's blockade on the Gaza Strip.

== Asia ==
=== Armenia ===
On 15 November 2023, unknown assailants set fire to the Mordechai Navi Synagogue in Yerevan and disseminated the arson attack on social media.

=== China ===
After the war began, the Associated Press noted a rise in antisemitism on Chinese social media sites, substantive enough that the Israeli embassy in Beijing had to filter comments on its social media account. An employee of the Israeli embassy in Beijing was stabbed and injured by a foreign man on 13 October 2023.

Antisemitic reactions to the war have been widespread on Chinese social media. Antisemitic comments were not removed from Chinese social media sites, suggesting that the state is comfortable with these kinds of remarks, according to Eric Liu, an editor of China Digital Times.

=== Turkey ===
In October 2023, Turkish Jewish newspaper Şalom reported rising cases of antisemitism and reported hate speech on Twitter and social media. In one example, a second-hand book store in a tourist area put up a sign saying "No Jews allowed".

=== United Arab Emirates ===
In November 2024, Chabad rabbi Zvi Kogan was found murdered in Al Ain, UAE. Emirati officials said he was abducted by three Uzbek nationals who fled to Turkey, where authorities apprehended and extradited them to the UAE.

=== Vietnam ===
In June 2024, a family of Jewish social media influencers, the Namdars, posted a video apparently showing them subjected to antisemitic insults by the owner of a restaurant in Hanoi, Vietnam.

== Europe ==
=== Austria ===
On 1 November 2023, unidentified vandals set a fire and sprayed swastikas on external walls overnight in the Jewish section of the Vienna Central Cemetery. The entrance lobby to a ceremonial hall was burned for the first time since the 1938 Kristallnacht pogrom by the Nazis, but there were no injuries. The attack was condemned by Austrian Chancellor Karl Nehammer.

A periodic survey among 8,000 Jews in 13 EU member states, published on 11 July 2024 by the European Union Agency for Fundamental Rights, indicated that 38% of the 363 Austrian respondents had experienced antisemitic harassment in the year before the survey. In addition, 62% of those polled encountered online antisemitism all the time in the year leading up to the survey, and 18% said that antisemitism they encountered had negatively affected their mental health.

=== Belgium ===
On 22 November 2023, at least 85 gravestones were damaged and many Stars of David were stolen from a cemetery in Charleroi. Only the cemetery's Jewish section was vandalized. On 19 December, swastikas and Stars of David were graffitied on gravestones in a Jewish cemetery in Kraainem.

In August 2024, Belgian author Herman Brusselmans wrote a column in Humo, a humor magazine, stating that when he saw images of a Palestinian child crying for his dead mother, he imagined it was his own son and friend suffering in Gaza, leading him to "get so angry that I want to ram a sharp knife through the throat of every Jew I meet." In response to backlash against the column, the magazine stated that Brusselmans was a satirist whose work should not be taken literally and removed the column. Brusselmans was charged with antisemitism and incitement to hatred. He was acquitted in March 2025.

=== Cyprus ===
Israel confirmed the Mossad helped local authorities foil a terror plot against Israeli and Jewish people in Cyprus on 10 December 2023. Netanyahu's office accused the Iranian government of being behind the plot, and said on behalf of the Mossad that Israel was "troubled" by Iranian use of Turkish-controlled Northern Cyprus for both terrorism and as an "operational and transit area".

=== Czech Republic ===
In August 2024, the Federation of Jewish Communities in the Czech Republic reported 4,328 antisemitic incidents in the country in 2023, an increase of 90% from the previous year. From October to December, 1,800 incidents occurred, accounting for almost 42% of the incidents of the entire year.

=== Denmark ===
In December 2023, Danish police arrested at least four suspected Hamas operatives who were planning attacks on Jewish or Israeli targets in Denmark.

In February 2024, Denmark's Jewish community reported a record high of 121 antisemitic incidents in the country in 2023, 101 since the October 7 attacks.

=== France ===
In response to a rise in antisemitic incidents, the French Interior Minister Gerald Darmanin ordered a ban on pro-Palestinian demonstrations in the country in a letter sent to regional police authorities on 12 October 2023. In a televised address later that day, French President Emmanuel Macron warned, "Let's remember that antisemitism has always been the precursor to other forms of hate: one day against the Jews, the next against the Christians, then the Muslims, and then all those who are still the target of hate due to their culture, origin or gender." On October 18, the Conseil d'État rejected an appeal by a pro-Palestinian organization asking for the suspension of Darmanin's instruction, but stated that only local authorities should review individual cases for security risks. According to the ruling, Darmanin later clarified that he only referred to protests publicly celebrating the October 7 attacks.

On 31 October 2023, Stars of David were painted in multiple spots across several building fronts in a southern district of Paris. Similar tags appeared over the weekend in suburbs of the city, including Vanves, Fontenay-aux-Roses and Aubervilliers.

On 4 November 2023, a Jewish woman was stabbed in Lyon and a swastika was graffitied on her home.

A report released in late January 2024, approximately 3.5 months post the October 7 attack, documented a significant uptick in antisemitic acts within France. The Service de Protection de la Communauté Juive (SPCJ) reported a 1000% surge in antisemitic incidents in 2023 compared to the previous year, totaling 1,676 recorded acts. The majority of these incidents targeted individuals, involving threatening words and gestures.

The SPCJ identified "Palestine" as a significant factor, mentioned in almost one-third of antisemitic acts since October 7. Additionally, French Jews reported feeling increasingly unsafe, with a 1,500% increase in antisemitic acts in private spheres and a surge of 1,200% in antisemitic acts within schools or educational settings, often related to Nazism.

Between 7 October and 17 December 2023 over 1,200 French Jews opened Aliyah files to migrate to Israel an increase of 430% compared to last year. Many were driven by a combination of solidarity with Israel as well as rising antisemitism in France.

Between 13 and 14 May 2024, vandals graffitied several sites around The Marais, a historic district home to many Jews, with red handprints, a symbol used by pro-Palestinian activists. Sites vandalized include schools, nurseries, and The Wall of the Righteous, a memorial that honors individuals who saved Jews during the Nazi occupation of France. The incident was described as antisemitic by French President Emmanuel Macron, President of the Conseil Représentatif des Institutions juives de France Yonathan Arfi, and the Union of Jewish Students in France.

On 17 May 2024, a synagogue in Rouen was set on fire by an Algerian arsonist, damaging the synagogue significantly.

On 19 June 2024, two teenagers were charged with the gang rape of a 12-year-old Jewish girl in Courbevoie while making antisemitic remarks. A third boy was also charged for making antisemitic insults and death threats to the girl. One boy admitted to hitting the victim due to her negative comments about Palestine. The girl was reportedly called a "dirty Jew".

On 27 July 2024, the Paris prosecutor's office launched an investigation into antisemitic crimes in a football match between Israel and Paraguay during the 2024 Summer Olympics.

On 24 August 2024, an 33-year-old Algerian man set fires at the Beth Yacoov synagogue in La Grande-Motte in an attempt to burn it down. The fire caused a gas canister to explode, lightly injuring a police officer. The suspect said that he attacked the synagogue in support of Palestine and wanted to provoke a reaction from Israeli officials.

According to the French Interior Ministry, 1570 antisemitic acts were recorded in 2024, representing 62% of all religiously motivated hate crimes in the country.

In May 2025, France's Holocaust memorial, two synagogues and a restaurant in central Paris were vandalized with green paint, which Mayor Anne Hidalgo called antisemitic.

=== Germany ===
In Berlin, on 14 October 2023 at least three houses where Jewish people resided were marked with a Star of David, echoing the marking of Jewish homes and businesses during Nazism.

On 18 October 2023, two Molotov cocktails were thrown at a synagogue in the Mitte neighborhood of central Berlin. One person was arrested. Following the firebombing, German Chancellor Olaf Scholz declared, "Attacks on Jewish institutions and acts of violence on our streets are despicable and cannot be tolerated. Antisemitism has no place in Germany."

On 22 October 2023, Chancellor Scholz said, "I am deeply outraged by the way in which antisemitic hatred and inhuman agitation have been breaking out since that fateful October 7, on the internet, in social media around the world, and shamefully also here in Germany. Here in Germany, of all places. That is why our 'never again' must be unbreakable."

In February 2024, a pro-Palestinian college student in Berlin punched a pro-Israeli, Jewish classmate in the face and kicked him while lying on the ground; he suffered severe injuries requiring multiple surgeries. According to the police, the assault occurred after an argument about the Gaza war, but the victim said it was unprovoked. A court determined the assault was antisemitic and sentenced the assailant to 3 years in prison in April 2025.

On 5 April 2024, an unknown individual threw an incendiary device at the door of a synagogue in the northern city of Oldenburg, causing a small blaze and minor damage. German police have offered a cash reward for information about the arson attack.

In Autumn 2024, Germany's parliament passed a resolution against antisemitism described by Human Rights Watch as "so broad that it encompasses people and organizations whose criticism has no antisemitic intent".

On 2 November 2024, a Stolperstein (a memorial for Holocaust victims) in Oschersleben was stolen. Ten more were stolen the previous month in Zeitz, and five in Halle.

Germany's Federal Association of Departments for Research and Information on Antisemitism (RIAS) reported that in the first half of 2024, they had recorded 1383 antisemitic incidents in Berlin alone, compared to 1270 in all of 2023.

In February 2025, two men in Berlin, one Lebanese and one from Gaza, attacked a non-Jewish man whom they believed to be Jewish, chanting "he should die because he is a Jew". The State Prosecutor's Office are treating the crime as an antisemitic attack.

=== Greece ===
In May 2024, a Greek woman, two Iranians, and an Afghan accomplice used a makeshift incendiary bomb to attack an Israeli-owned hotel and restaurant in Athens. On June 18 of that year, a Greek man and an Afghan man committed an arson attack against a synagogue in Athens. In July, Greek anti-terrorism police arrested all six, as well as an Iranian accomplice to the second group.

On 16 February 2025, two Palestinian men attacked an Israeli couple in Athens after hearing them speak Hebrew and seeing their Star of David necklaces, resulting in one of the victims being stabbed on his forehead.

=== Ireland ===
Chief Rabbi of Ireland Yoni Wieder has criticized Irish president Michael D. Higgins for "[neglecting] even to acknowledge the scourge of contemporary antisemitism in Ireland, let alone do anything to address it." Oliver Sears, the founder of Holocaust Awareness Ireland and the son of a Holocaust survivor, also criticized Higgins' denial of antisemitism in Ireland.

In November 2024, the Jewish Representative Council of Ireland reported high levels of antisemitism and an anti-Jewish, anti-Israel atmosphere in public schools. Examples included characterizing Judaism as a violent religion, in contrast to Islam, which was described as "in favor of peace", portraying Biblical villains in distinctively Jewish clothing, and calling Auschwitz a "prisoner of war camp". Irish Education Minister Norma Foley denied that antisemitism was being taught in schools, and refused to meet with JRCI chair Maurice Cohen.

In April 2025, researchers Motti Inbari and Kirill Bumin found extremely high levels of antisemitism and anti-Israel sentiment in Ireland, with Catholics much more likely than Protestants to hold antisemitic views.

In June 2025, parents at a primary school in Dublin accused a teacher and a special education teacher of "blatant anti-Semitism" and "psychologically abusive behaviour." The teachers subsequently resigned, claiming they had been "harassed and bullied" by parents due to their support for Palestine. Their expressions of solidarity reportedly included wearing keffiyeh scarves and T-shirts, as well as displaying a tattoo.

=== Italy ===
On 25 April 2024, during the march in celebration of Liberation Day in Milan, a group of North African youths wearing keffiyas and Palestinian flags attacked the participants of the Jewish Brigade in Piazza del Duomo with kicks, punches and sticks. A 19-year-old Egyptian man was arrested for beating a security guard with a stick. Eight other men from North Africa have been reported to criminal prosecutors.

In November 2024, a mural in Milan by artist aleXsandro Palombo of Holocaust survivors Liliana Segre and Sami Modiano was vandalized, with the figures' faces and Jewish stars scratched out. Several other works by the artist focusing on antisemitism have also been defaced.

Also in November, an Israeli Jewish couple were denied a stay by a hotel in Selva di Cadore, with the manager accusing all Israelis of "genocide".

On 11 January 2025, protesters in Bologna vandalized the city's historic synagogue, attacking it with fireworks and Molotov cocktails. In June 2025, a man vandalized a synagogue in Rome, writing the Nazi slogans "Sieg heil" and "Juden Raus".

In late July 2025, a mob in Milan attacked a visibly Jewish man and his son, yelling "Free Palestine", "murders", and "genocide", while kicking and punching him. The Antisemitism Observatory, based in Milan, reported 877 incidents in Italy in 2024, nearly twice as many as in 2023 (454).

A 2025 poll found that 15% of Italians believe that attacks on Jewish people are 'justifiable', and 18% believe antisemitic graffiti on walls and other public spaces is legitimate.

=== Latvia ===
Following the Gaza war, several Riga Stradiņš University students from Israel were reported to have received hate texts from other foreign students, with one person contacting the State Security Service in connection with antisemitic expressions and threats. The Ministry of Education and Science said that it will assess the situation at the university regarding possible conflicts between foreign students in connection with the Israeli–Palestinian conflict, while the State Security Service confirmed that it was investigating the situation.

Latvian Foreign Minister Krišjānis Kariņš said, "Latvia must have zero tolerance against any manifestations of incitement to ethnic hatred, and possible conflicts between foreign students of Riga Stradins University (RSU) should be taken very seriously", stressing that, "If it really turns out RSU students are inciting ethnic hatred, it could result not only in expulsion from the university, but also from the country".

=== Netherlands ===
Following the 7 October attacks, the local Jewish community voiced its concern that unrest in the Middle East could spread to the Netherlands, citing historical trends. The National Coordinator for Combating Antisemitism of the Dutch government and the interest group Center for Information and Documentation Israel (CIDI) reported a considerable increase in antisemitic expression since the escalation of hostilities. Recorded incidents, collected in accordance with the IHRA definition of antisemitism, include acts of vandalism, verbal and physical abuse, intimidation, and bullying.

On 25 October 2023, the CIDI filed a complaint against the owner of the popular Instagram account CestMocro and a number of its followers for inciting hatred and violence against Jews. It also called on the cabinet of ministers to take an explicit position "against this form of incitement against the Jewish community". Instagram removed the account CestMocroTV of the same owner on 8 November 2023. BBB party leader Caroline van der Plas renewed the call to ban CestMocro after the November 2024 Amsterdam riots. Several legal experts spoke out against the proposal, considering it to be an "exceptional and disproportionate" measure.

In December 2023, German prosecutors announced the arrests of four suspected Hamas members, one of whom was a Dutch national who had been apprehended in Rotterdam. The group had allegedly planned to attack Jewish sites.

Allegations of antisemitism were raised after a series of lectures on the Holocaust at the Utrecht University of Applied Sciences (HU) were postponed indefinitely in January 2024, after pro-Palestinian activists had criticized the involvement of the CIDI in the development of the curriculum. In a statement, the university announced that it needed "more time to place the events of 7 October and beyond in a broader perspective, with room for diverse opinions and beliefs", later adding that "the safety of speakers, students, teachers and visitors cannot be guaranteed". The CIDI and fellow interest groups in the Central Jewish Consultation responded negatively, questioning the relation between Holocaust education and the Israeli–Palestinian conflict and claiming that the HU had shown that "threats and intimidation work". In the wake of widespread disapproval and criticism from politicians and other public figures, the university reversed its decision.

On 10 March 2024, the National Holocaust Museum in Amsterdam was inaugurated by King Willem-Alexander in a ceremony attended by a number of Holocaust survivors and their descendants, Jewish community leaders, and foreign dignitaries, which included President Isaac Herzog of Israel. In response, about a thousand pro-Palestinian demonstrators gathered in the vicinity to protest the latter's attendance and their belief that Israel is committing genocide in Gaza. The atmosphere of the protests around the Portuguese Synagogue was described as "grim", as protesters jeered at ceremony guests, threw projectiles, vandalized police vehicles, and skirmished with riot police, resulting in 13 arrests.

A concert by Lenny Kuhr in Waalwijk on 24 March 2024 was disrupted by four people who unfurled a Palestinian flag and called her a terrorist and accused the singer's family in Israel of genocide. Demissionary Minister of Justice and Security Dilan Yeşilgöz denounced the action and stated: "That is hatred of Jews. There is no place for that in the Netherlands." The National Coordinator for Combating Antisemitism, Eddo Verdoner, also described the incident as antisemitic. Kuhr is Jewish and has relatives living in Israel, including a grandchild who is a conscript in the country's military. Citing persistent safety concerns, Kuhr retired from performing and moved to Israel in 2026.

On 9 July 2024, a statue of Holocaust victim Anne Frank on the Merwedeplein in Amsterdam-Zuid was discovered to be defaced. The statue's feet had been daubed in red paint and the word 'Gaza' was sprayed onto its pedestal. Mayor Femke Halsema condemned the act of vandalism as an "incredible disgrace" and called on witnesses to come forward. On 4 August, the 80th anniversary of the Frank family's arrest, the statue was again smeared with red paint. This time the text 'Free Gaza' was sprayed onto the pedestal and the statue's hands were also daubed in paint. Later in August, an information board in Gouda describing Frank's persecution and the publication of her diary was left illegible after a Palestinian flag was sprayed on it. In April 2025, the 'Am Yisrael Chai' Holocaust monument and the residence of a general practitioner in Oud-Beijerland were defaced with red spray paint.

A periodic survey among 8,000 Jews in 13 EU member states, published on 11 July 2024 by the European Union Agency for Fundamental Rights, showed that respondents in the Netherlands experienced above-average levels of antisemitism. The report indicated that 97% of the 561 Dutch respondents had encountered antisemitism in their daily life in the year leading up to the survey and 83% thought that antisemitism had increased in the last five years. 78% of those polled felt they were blamed at least occasionally for the Israeli government's actions because they are Jewish, 77% avoided wearing Jewish symbols in public at least occasionally (including 49% who never wear Jewish symbols for safety concerns), and 42% avoided certain places because they did not feel safe as a Jew. Moreover, 39% of respondents had experienced antisemitic harassment in the year before the survey and 6% had been victim of an antisemitic attack in the last five years.

On 6 and 7 November 2024, Israeli fans of Maccabi Tel Aviv Football Club were attacked by pro-Palestinian protesters and Amsterdam residents in a series of riots. In total, up to 30 people were injured, seven of whom were hospitalized, and 62 people were arrested. The Jerusalem Post and The Times of Israel described the violence as a pogrom, and the Israeli government sent emergency flights to evacuate its citizens. In a statement she has since retracted, Amsterdam mayor Femke Halsema referred to the attackers as "antisemitic hit-and-run squads". Some Israeli and Jewish figures, including US Special Envoy to Monitor and Combat Antisemitism Deborah Lipstadt, compared the event to the 1938 Kristallnacht pogrom in Nazi Germany.

Singer-songwriter Douwe Bob was publicly accused of antisemitism by VVD prominents Dilan Yeşilgöz and Ulysse Ellian, among others, after he canceled his performance at a Jewish football tournament in Amsterdam-Zuid on 29 June 2025. The artist and his manager countered that their decision to do so had been informed by the presence of "a Zionist poster and pamphlets" at the event, while they had been assured that there would be no political or religious expressions. Douwe Bob filed a complaint against Yeşilgöz in July, accusing her of defamation and insult. The following month, he filed summary proceedings against the politician, demanding that she remove and rectify the tweet in which she had accused him of antisemitism. Yeşilgöz removed the tweet and apologized in a joint statement with Douwe Bob on 11 August.

On 4 August 2025, the progressive Jewish congregation 'Beth Yehudah' in The Hague announced that it intended to file a discrimination complaint against a landscaping company that had canceled an appointment due to the "terrible situation in Gaza".

=== Norway ===
According to a report from Israel's Diaspora Affairs Ministry, 69% of Norwegian Jews have personally experienced antisemitism since October 2023. In 2024, the Jewish cemetery in Trondheim was vandalized, and someone threw a Molotov cocktail at the synagogue there.

=== Poland ===
At a pro-Palestinian protest in Warsaw on 21 October 2023, a Norwegian medical student was pictured holding an antisemitic poster that showed the flag of Israel in a trash can alongside the text "keep the world clean."

On 12 December 2023, far-right Polish lawmaker Grzegorz Braun used a fire extinguisher on a lit menorah and removed it from the wall during a Hanukkah celebration involving Polish-Jewish leaders and Israel's ambassador in the country's parliament. Braun then said, "There can be no place for the acts of this racist, tribal, wild Talmudic cult on the premises of the Sejm." He was expelled from parliament as a result, and his actions were condemned by several Polish politicians and his own party.

On Yom HaShoah, May 2024, a group of pro-Palestinian protesters disrupted the March of the Living, a remembrance march from Auschwitz to Birkenau to commemorate the Jewish victims of the concentration camps. Survivors of the 7 October attacks were also present at the march.

In October 2024, a sign calling for Jews to be sent to gas chambers was seen at a pro-Palestinian protest at Jagiellonian University in Krakow.

=== Portugal ===
On 11 October 2023, three days after the October 7 attacks by Hamas on Israel, vandals defaced the synagogue of Porto's Jewish community, leaving pro-Palestinian messages, including "Free Palestine" and "End Israeli apartheid". On February 3, 2024, a housing protest in Porto escalated into an antisemitic demonstration, where participants held signs assigning blame to Jews and Zionists for economic challenges. Some signs called for the 'cleansing the world of Jews'.

In June 2025, the Israeli news website KAN News reported the discovery of a plot to poison Israeli attendees of the Boom Festival with strychnine, set their tents on fire, and defecate in their food. The woman who discovered the WhatsApp chat detailing these plans brought the information to the festival organizers and police, neither of whom did anything about it.

=== Russia ===
On 29 October 2023 a mob of antisemitic protesters stormed the airport in Dagestan in search of Israeli passengers from Tel Aviv. On 23 June 2024, Islamic extremist gunmen in Dagestan attacked synagogues and churches, setting fire to the Kele-Numaz Synagogue in Derbent and a synagogue in Makhachkala.

=== Spain ===
In October 2023, Isaac Benzaquén, president of the Federation of Jewish Communities of Spain, met with Prime Minister Pedro Sánchez, denouncing the "anti-Israeli and anti-Jewish climate" in Spain that has caused many Jews to not wear Jewish symbols for fear of being attacked.

On 18 October 2023, the Or Zaruah synagogue in Melilla, a Spanish enclave in North Africa, was attacked by a mob chanting "murderous Israel" while waving Palestinian flags.

In April 2024, a woman wearing a shirt with the date 7 October and an anti-fascist symbol was arrested by Spanish police after insulting and assaulting another woman for being Jewish during a pro-Palestine demonstration in Madrid.

The Spanish Observatory Against Antisemitism recorded 193 incidents in 2024, a 321% increase from 2023 (60 cases), and a 567% increase from 2022 (34 cases). The majority of incidents were linked to the Gaza war.

On 23 July 2025, a group of 52 French Jewish people from a summer camp were removed from a Vueling plane in Valencia. The camp group has stated that they were removed because the children were singing songs in Hebrew even though they had stopped at the cabin crew's request. A video shared online shows a woman being handcuffed on the floor. According to the airline, the children had disregarded crew instructions and endangered airline safety by interfering with the plane's safety demonstration and emergency equipment. Additionally, the airline stated that a member of the group was arrested for being aggressive. French Foreign Minister Jean-Noël Barrot called on the airline to investigate whether the incident was motivated by antisemitism.

=== Sweden ===
One viral video posted in October 2023 claimed that all major Swedish media outlets are "owned by Jewish families".

On 4 November 2023, pro-Palestinian demonstrators burned an Israeli flag and chanted "bomb Israel" outside the Malmö Synagogue. The European Jewish Congress condemned the incident: "Intimidating the Jewish community and blaming them for the events in the Middle East is blatant antisemitism."

In 2024, The Times of Israel reported that between October 7, 2023, and the end of December 2023, there were 110 reported antisemitic incidents, over four times as many as the previous year. About 20% contained reference to the Gaza war, blaming individual Swedish Jews for Israel's actions in Gaza.

Israeli defense minister Israel Katz described the Swedish activist Greta Thunberg as "antisemitic" in threats made to the June 2025 Gaza Freedom Flotilla.

=== Switzerland ===
On March 2, 2024, an Orthodox Jew was stabbed by a 15-year old in Zürich. The teen later said that he was doing the attack on behalf of Al-Aqsa, alluding to Jihadist concepts.

=== United Kingdom ===
On 13 October 2023, British Prime Minister Rishi Sunak said, "There's been a quite frankly disgusting rise in antisemitic incidents." The Guardian reported a week later that, according to the Metropolitan police, there had been a 1,350% increase in hate crimes against Jewish people since the start of the war.

In August 2024, the Jewish charity group Community Security Trust (CST) reported that there had been 1,978 antisemitic incidents in the UK in the first half of 2024, more than double those in the same period of the year prior. The group tallied 272 antisemitic incidents during the 2023–2024 school year, over five times the number in the previous year. In one example, the University of Leeds Jewish chaplain received threats to rape and kill his wife and murder his children. The surge mirrored the previous peak which was during the 2021 Israel-Hamas conflict. A December 2024 survey revealed increased antisemitic attitudes among younger British people and British Christians.

Also according to the CST, in June 2025, antisemitic incidents in the UK surged following a controversial performance by the punk-rap duo Bob Vylan at the Glastonbury Festival, during which frontman Bobby Vylan chanted "death to the IDF" on stage. CST recorded 26 antisemitic incidents on June 29, the day after the performance—the highest single-day total in the first half of the year. Prime Minister Keir Starmer described the performance as "appalling hate speech", while Conservative leader Kemi Badenoch called the scene "grotesque", adding that "glorifying violence against Jews isn't edgy". Chief Rabbi Ephraim Mirvis called the broadcast of the chant "a national shame" and an example of "vile Jew hatred." Describing the rhetoric as "utterly chilling," the CST warned that hostility toward Israel was increasingly translating into anti-Jewish hate, both online and offline. Band member Bobbie Vylan criticized the reactions in a statement: "They want to control this country's narrative to frame genocide as Israel defending itself." The band also released a statement, writing, "We are not for the death of Jews, Arabs or any other race or group of people. We are for the dismantling of a violent military machine.... A machine that has destroyed much of Gaza."

On October 2, 2025, the morning of Yom Kippur, Prestwich resident Jihad al-Shamie attacked the Heaton Park Hebrew Congregation in Manchester, driving a car into pedestrians before getting out and stabbing worshipers. The attacker killed one person and the police shot another by accident while also shooting the suspect and three others were seriously injured. The attack was declared an act of terror later that same day.

In March and April 2026, a series of attacks targeted London's Jewish community. The attacks have involved arson, explosive devices and chemicals, and targeted Jewish schools, synagogues and charities. Responsibility for the attacks was claimed by Harakat Ashab al-Yamin al-Islamia, which is believed to be a front group for Iran's Islamic Revolutionary Guard Corps, who had outsourced the acts to local criminals and used the group to create plausible deniability.

== North America ==
=== Canada ===
Multiple sources have reported an increase in antisemitic incidents in Canada since the October 7 attacks. In November 2023, Prime Minister Justin Trudeau stated, "We're seeing right now a rise in antisemitism that is terrifying: Molotov cocktails thrown at synagogues, horrific threats of violence targeting Jewish businesses, targeting Jewish daycares with hate". In May 2024, Conservative politician Pierre Poilievre said that antisemitic incidents increased more than 100% in the past year. The Canadian government reported a 71% increase in reported antisemitic hate crimes between 2022 and 2023. The number decreased slightly in 2024, but Jewish people remained the most common victims of hate crimes compared to other groups. B'nai Brith Canada reported 5,791 antisemitic incidents in 2023, including a 208% increase in violent incidents since 2022. The number of incidents reported by B'nai Brith increased 7% in 2024. In a 2025 report, the Israeli Ministry of Diaspora Affairs and Combating Antisemitism referred to Canada as the "champion of antisemitism", stating that Canada had a 670% increase in antisemitic incidents in 2024. According to Jewish Currents, the 670% figure is unsourced.

A 2024 study found that Canadian Jews feel like they experience more discrimination than any other group and that the “degree to which Canadian Jews feel they are unsafe is strongly associated with their emotional attachment to Israel.” According to a survey of 1,000 Jewish medical professionals, 39% of respondents stated that they experienced antisemitism in hospitals after October 7, and 98% expressed concern about antisemitism's effect on healthcare; 31% of Jewish doctors in Ontario had contemplated moving to another country. An online survey of 599 Jewish parents found that there were 781 antisemitic incidents in K-12 schools in Ontario between October 2023 and April 2025, 60% of which were anti-Israel statements. About 1 in 8 of respondents moved their children to another school because of antisemitism, and schools did not look into about half of incidents reported.

Multiple Jewish institutions have been targeted since the October 7 attacks, but no casualties have been reported as of August 2025. Schools including Talmud Torah Elementary, Yeshiva Gedola, and Bais Chaya Mushka Girls Elementary School in Montreal have been shot with gunfire. Synagogues in Victoria, BC and Halifax have been vandalised with antisemitic graffiti. The entrance to a synagogue in Vancouver was set on fire in May 2024. That year, the Toronto synagogue Kehillat Shaarei Torah was vandalized seven times, including with a dead raccoon on one occasion. On 21 August 2024, more than 100 Jewish institutions received the same bomb threat.

In November 2023, there was a heated dispute regarding the Gaza war between pro-Israeli and pro-Palestinian students at Concordia University. The situation escalated into violence leading to one student's arrest and minor injuries to three people. A Université de Montréal lecturer was suspended after video showing him yelling: "Go back to Poland" during the fight was shared on social media.

Jewish students and teachers of the Peel District School Board told National Post that they experienced numerous antisemitic incidents and that the school system was not taking adequate action to address it. Some of the incidents they reported include a teacher posting "Jews are the problem" in a private Facebook group and students chanting "we call for Jewish genocide" during a pro-Palestine protest.

=== United States ===
==== Overview ====
In January 2024, the Anti-Defamation League (ADL) published a press release citing over 3,000 antisemitic incidents in the US and claiming a 360% increase in antisemitic incidents in the US in the period after the October 7 attacks. The ADL's CEO, Jonathan Greenblatt, who has stated that anti-Zionism is antisemitism, claimed that "the American Jewish community is facing a threat level that’s now unprecedented in modern history." The Nation reported that "many of the cited 'incidents' were actions directed against Israel to protest the conduct of its war in Gaza—incidents the ADL would later admit made up nearly half of the total." These incidents included protests by groups such as Students for Justice in Palestine. According to The Forward, two out of three of the incidents cited by the ADL were tied to Israel, and that "overall, a large share of the incidents appear to be expressions of hostility toward Israel, rather than the traditional forms of antisemitism that the organization [ADL] had focused on in previous years."

Hedy Wald and Steven Roth noted increased antisemitic incidents in U.S. medicine in late 2023, including Holocaust distortion and inversion.

Surveys published in February 2024 by the American Jewish Committee indicate that since October 7, 2023, the proportion of Americans who say that the "status of Jews in the U.S. is less secure than a year ago" increased significantly, and the top reason given was the war and its aftermath.

A study commissioned by the Israeli NGO Combat Antisemitism Movement, published in October 2024, estimated that 61% of American Jews reported experiencing antisemitism during the year since the war began, and that the proportion of Jewish adults in the US saying there was antisemitism in their area was more than double that of previous years, and an ADL report in late 2024 said that there were 200% more antisemitic incidents from October 7, 2023, to September 24, 2024, relative to the same period a year prior. A December 2024 study by the ADL found that job applicants with Jewish or Israeli names were discriminated against in hiring.

==== Incidents ====
The increase in antisemitic incidents has included instances of individual harassment and violent or property crime. On October 9, 2023, a sukkah at California State Polytechnic University, Humboldt was vandalized with anti-Israel graffiti. On October 10, a man threw rocks through the glass doors of a synagogue and cafe in Fresno, California, the second with a note reading "All Jewish businesses will be targeted". On October 11, a man was arrested for sending threatening emails to a synagogue in Charlotte, North Carolina. On October 14, a man in New York's Grand Central Terminal punched a woman in the face and told her it was because she was Jewish.

On October 15, 2023, in Berkeley, California, a billboard calling out antisemitism was defaced with anti-Israel graffiti. Several San Francisco buildings were vandalized with similar messages—some praising Hamas' attacks—sparking condemnation by Mayor London Breed and District Attorney Brooke Jenkins, who characterized the graffiti as antisemitic. Around seven members of White Lives Matter California held a demonstration on a bridge in Walnut Creek, holding up signs reading "No More Wars for I$rael" and promoting the neo-Nazi propaganda film Europa: The Last Battle.

On October 19, 2023, the Illinois Comptroller's office fired one of its lawyers, Sarah Chowdhury, over antisemitic remarks she posted on the Instagram page of another lawyer, who is Jewish, including the statement "Hitler should have eradicated all of you". The latter said that Chowdhury had been prompted to make the remarks by media coverage of the war in Gaza. Chowdhury was also fired from her position as president of the South Asian Bar Association of Chicago.

On October 29, threats against the Jewish community at Cornell University were posted online, threatening to shoot, rape, and murder Jewish students and encouraging violence against them. The FBI is investigating the incident as a hate crime. On October 31, the New York State Police announced they had a person of interest in custody. Patrick Dai, a junior at Cornell as the time, eventually pled guilty in federal court to one count of "posting threats to kill or injure another person using interstate communications." His lawyer said that his comments were made to garner sympathy for Jewish students.

In January 2024 a game between the girls' varsity basketball teams from The Leffell School and Roosevelt High School Early College Studies in Yonkers was stopped when Roosevelt students began hurling antisemitic slurs at Leffell students. The New York City Public Schools Alliance reported that one of the students yelled "I support Hamas, you fucking Jew" and during the third quarter became aggressive and violent during the play resulting in injuries of Leffell's players.

The NYPD recorded 45 antisemitic hate crimes in New York City in June 2024, 57% of the total number of reported hate crimes.

Demonstrators at protests against the Israel–Hamas war and other aspects of the Arab–Israeli conflict have been accused of antisemitic acts. On 10 June 2024, a demonstration organized by Within Our Lifetime took place near a memorial exhibit in lower Manhattan for the victims of the Nova music festival massacre, in which over 360 people were killed. New York leaders and politicians, including mayor Eric Adams and US Representatives Hakeem Jeffries, Ritchie Torres, Jamaal Bowman, and Alexandria Ocasio-Cortez condemned the demonstration as antisemitic. Two days later, five houses (three in Manhattan, two in Brooklyn) belonging to Jewish leaders and board members, including Brooklyn Museum director Anne Pasternak were vandalized with red paint and pro-Palestinian graffiti. Red triangles were spray-painted onto one of the houses. On June 23, 2024, pro-Palestinian demonstrators attempted to block people from entering the main entrance of the Adas Torah synagogue, Los Angeles, which was hosting a seminar about real estate in Israel and West Bank settlements. Organizers said they were protesting the advertisement of homes in the occupied West Bank, where Israeli settlements are illegal under international law. The demonstration deteriorated into violent clashes between pro-Palestinian participants and pro-Israel counterprotesters. A Jewish woman was beaten at the scene. President Biden tweeted, "I'm appalled by the scenes outside of Adas Torah synagogue in Los Angeles. Intimidating Jewish congregants is dangerous, unconscionable, antisemitic, and un-American." At least two lawsuits have been filed against the protest groups, alleging that they violated the law by blocking people from attending a religious event.

On 10 August 2024, 22-year-old Victor Sumpter stabbed a Jewish man in his 30s near the headquarters of the Chabad Lubavitch movement in Crown Heights, Brooklyn while yelling "Free Palestine". The Jewish man was hospitalized and was expected to recover. Sumpter was arrested and charged second-degree assault as a hate crime.

On October 26, 2024, a man in Chicago was arrested and charged with 14 felonies after shooting a 39-year-old Jewish man who was walking to synagogue. The gunman, Sidi Mohamed Abdallahi, also shot at police and paramedics before being apprehended. Alderman Debra Silverstein called for the case to be treated as a hate crime. On November 1, authorities charged Abdallahi with terrorism and hate crime charges. Chicago mayor Brandon Johnson condemned the attack following Silverstein's criticism of his initial failure to identify the victim as "a Jewish man, wearing traditional Jewish garb, walking to a Jewish place of worship on the Jewish day of rest."

On April 13, 2025, police arrested Cody Balmer for an arson attack against the Pennsylvania Governor's Residence, while the Jewish Governor Josh Shapiro and his family were asleep on the first night of Passover. Dauphin County District Attorney Fran Chardo called the attack a hate crime, based on Balmer's statements of hatred for the governor over his support of Israel.

On May 21, 2025, a Pro-Palestinian supporter, Elias Rodriguez, shot and killed two Israeli embassy workers outside the Capital Jewish Museum in Washington, D.C. Rodriguez, a 30-year-old man from Chicago, was apprehended by event security staff and reportedly chanted "Free, free Palestine!" while in custody. A witness reported Rodriguez pulled out a keffiyeh and said "I did it. I did it for Gaza. Free free Palestine". The victims were a young couple, Yaron Lischinsky (a German-Israeli) and Sarah Milgrim (a Jewish American) had been attending an event at the museum, "Young Diplomats Reception" hosted by the American Jewish Committee.

On June 1, 2025, in Boulder, Colorado, Mohamed Sabry Soliman, a male Egyptian immigrant, used a makeshift flamethrower and Molotov cocktails to attack a group participating in a walk for solidarity with Israeli hostages taken during the October 7 attacks, injuring eight people aged 52 to 88, including one critically. The 88-year-old victim was a Holocaust refugee. The Federal Bureau of Investigation (FBI) later confirmed the attack was being investigated as a targeted terror attack.

The Israeli Ministry of Foreign Affairs denounced New York Times journalist Nicholas Kristof's May 2026 op-ed "The Silence That Meets the Rape of Palestinians" as "Hamas propaganda" and "one of the worst blood libels ever to appear in the modern press", and Israeli Prime Minister Benjamin Netanyahu and his Minister of Foreign Affairs Gideon Sa'ar announced legal action against The New York Times for libel.

==== Under the Trump administration ====
In his second presidency, Donald Trump has made efforts to combat what he describes as antisemitism an important part of his policy. According to The New York Times, the Trump administration closely followed actions prescribed by Project Esther—a guideline for dealing with the Gaza war protests which it characterized as antisemitic—from The Heritage Foundation, the think tank behind Project 2025. In the first two weeks of his presidency, the US Department of Justice announced the establishment of a Task Force to Combat Anti-Semitism led by Leo Terrell. Beginning in March 2025, the Trump administration, again citing antisemitism, made major cuts in federal grants and funding to ten universities, including Columbia University, Harvard University, University of California, Los Angeles, and others. The Trump administration also imprisoned and attempted to deport students and activists whom it has described as antisemitic, and used AI to scan social media posts for content it described as antisemitic.

In 2025, the Israeli government launched a social media campaign targeting US Christians and signed millions of dollars' worth of contracts involving "strategic consulting, planning, and communications services to develop and execute a broad U.S. campaign to combat antisemitism." The largest of these, which Haaretz has called "hasbara contracts," was in August with the firm Clock Tower X—owned by Brad Parscale, who helped lead the digital aspect of Donald Trump's 2016 and 2020 presidential campaigns—to produce "at least 100 core pieces of content per month," 80% of which would be directed at young Americans on TikTok, Instagram, and YouTube.

==== Controversies ====
The ADL's assessment of the increase in antisemitic incidents has been criticized for conflating criticism of Israel with antisemitism. On November 11, 2023, The Intercept reported the ADL was including Jewish anti-war and peace rallies in its analysis of antisemitic attacks. Bernie Steinberg, the former director of Harvard Hillel, told The Harvard Crimson that pro-Israeli activists should stop "weaponizing" charges of antisemitism against pro-Palestinian activism, writing, "It is not antisemitic to demand justice for all Palestinians living in their ancestral lands."

The distinction between antisemitism — hostility, prejudice, or discrimination against Jews — and anti-Zionism — opposition to Zionism— has been a matter of debate in the US. Some pro-Israel organizations in North America, such as the Heritage Foundation, the Anti-Defamation League, Canary Mission, and Betar, have been accused of seeking to blur the distinction and have characterized protests against the war and genocide as antisemitic. Critics of these characterizations—including scholars, journalists, and activists—have described them as exploiting the accusation of antisemitism to silence criticism of Israel. During the Gaza war, in response to the protests, some US universities have adopted definitions of antisemitism, such as the IHRA definition, that critics say conflate anti-Zionism or criticism of Israel with antisemitism.

In 2025, the pro-Israel advocacy group StopAntisemitism has characterized Ms. Rachel as antisemitic and asked US attorney general Pam Bondi to investigate whether she is "being funded by a foreign party to push anti-Israel propaganda to skew public opinion." Ms. Rachel has called this accusation "absurd" and "patently false."

During the 2025 New York City mayoral election, critics of Zohran Mamadani characterized him as antisemitic, characterizations that have been strongly denied by Mamdani and his Jewish supporters. Following his victory in the election, the ADL announced a 'Mamdani Monitor' to "track and monitor Mamdani administration policies and appointments" with regard to matters it says "impact Jewish community safety and security." Prominent members of the Jewish communities of New York have asked Mamdani to tone down his comments about Israel so as not to inflame antisemitic violence and the Governor of the state of New York has suggested that should focus his attention on New York City rather than Israel.

== Oceania ==
=== Australia ===
Between October and December 2023, Australia experienced a surge in antisemitic incidents following the outbreak of hostilities between Israel and Hamas on 7 October, which researchers and government bodies have noted is complemented by a rise in attacks on Muslims. Between 7 October and 8 November, the Executive Council of Australian Jewry (ECAJ) recorded 221 antisemitic incidents, with 42 being recorded in one week alone. Documented hate crime incidents have included spitting at women, gun threats, threats to synagogues and Jewish schools, graffiti, property damage, hate mail, and verbal abuse. The Victorian Police also recorded 72 reports of antisemitic incidents between 7 October and 9 November, resulting in 37 investigations and 10 arrests. ECAJ's research director Julie Nathan believed that many incidents of antisemitism went unreported. By 9 December 2023, ECAJ estimated there had been a 591% increase in reported antisemitic incidents in Australia in 2023. Notable incidents have included a Sydney Jewish man being verbally abused for wearing a kippah and Jewish parents advising their children to hide Jewish clothing in public.

On October 9, 2023, participants in a pro-Palestinian rally in Sydney organized by Palestine Action Group were widely reported to have chanted "Gas the Jews" in front of the Sydney Opera House. However, a subsequent police review found that the phrase being chanted was "where's the Jews", but there was evidence of other "offensive and completely unacceptable" chants being said at the rally, such as "fuck the Jews".

Elsa Tuet-Rosenberg, Matt Chun and Zaineb Mazloum, and Clementine Ford launched a doxxing campaign against Jewish creatives in Australia, releasing personal details of over 600 including those with no direct connection with Israel and have not made public comments about the Hamas massacre or the war in Gaza. This resulted in a campaign of antisemitic harassment and death threats. Several of their shops were graffitied with "No Jews" messages while a couple received death threats to their 5-year-old child with a photograph of their child with a message saying "I Know where you live".

On 6 December 2024, the Adass Israel synagogue in Melbourne was attacked by an arsonist, injuring one person and heavily damaging the building. The Australian Federal Police investigated the incident as an act of terrorism. On 26 August 2025, Australian Prime Minister Anthony Albanese announced that ASIO have determined Iran was involved in planning the attack. The attack was one of multiple 2024 Iranian operations inside Australia.

On 12 February 2025, there was widespread condemnation after Israeli TikTok creator Max Veifer posted a video of Ahmad Rashad Nadir and Sarah Abu Lebdeh, NSW Health nurses at Bankstown Lidcombe Hospital, bragging about refusing to treat Israeli patients and killing Jews. The video caused widespread national and international outrage, with health ministers and politicians promptly condemning it as "vile".

On 14 December 2025, two Islamic State-linked gunmen committed a mass shooting at a Hanukkah celebration on Bondi Beach in Sydney, resulting in 15 people being killed, including one Israeli citizen.

=== New Zealand ===
In mid November 2023, New Zealand's Department of Internal Affairs (DIA) and The Disinformation Project reported a surge in both antisemitism and Islamophobia in New Zealand following the Gaza war. Antisemitic content surfaced on both social media and gaming platforms. According to Disinformation Project researcher Kate Hannah, New Zealand Jews were increasingly conflated with all Israelis and the Israeli Government. Hannah said that these attitudes were antisemitic, xenophobic and contributed to division in New Zealand society. Similarly, New Zealand Jewish Council spokesperson Juliet Moses reported a surge in antisemitic threats of violence, death threats and extreme abuse both online and offline since 7 October.

In mid December 2023, a survey conducted by the Holocaust Centre of New Zealand reported that New Zealand Jewish children were encountering an increase in antisemitic abuse, intimidation, and bullying. In two cases, one child was physically assaulted and another had a swastika and a Star of David drawn side-by-side on their school shirt. While the Holocaust Centre usually dealt with two formal antisemitic complaints each year, the number of complaints had increased by five times in the past two months since 7 October 2023. According to the Holocaust Centre, 40% of the incidents reported in the survey involved dehumanising and demonising allegations about Jews. These included children being greeted by their peers with Nazi salutes, being called "dirty Jews," being told "Jews control the world," and jokes about Jews being gassed, and the blood libel claim that Jews "chopped off baby's heads." However, only 40% of parents reported these incidents to their schools with the majority preferring to resolve the matter with the parent of the bullying child.

In late November 2024, the New Zealand Jewish Council reported a sharp increase in antisemitic incidents, with 227 in the year since October 7, an average of 9.7 each month, compared to 166 in the eight years from 2014 to 2022.

In late November 2025, Stuff reported a sharp rise in both antisemitic and anti-Muslim offences since October 7. This rose from 20 between September 2022 and October 2023, to 133 between October 2023 and September 2024 and 97 between October 2024 and September 2025. These figures included 9 antisemitic assaults between October 2023 and September 2024, and six assaults between October 2024 and September 2025. Incidents of property damage rose from four between October 2021 and September 2022, to 11 between October 2022 and September 2023 and 57 between September 2024 and September 2025. New Zealand Jewish Council president Juliet Moses expressed concern that New Zealand Jews were being targeted because of the "perceived and real actions" of the Israeli government during the Gaza war and said that the Jewish community had received assaults, attacks on property, graffiti verbal assaults and hate mail. Yael Schochat, of the dissident group "Dayenu — New Zealand Jews against occupation" condemned antisemitic attacks but argued that antisemitism should not be conflated with being "anti-Israel."

== South America ==
=== Argentina ===
On 18 October 2023, the US and Israeli embassies in Buenos Aires received bomb threats via email, including one which said "Jews we are going to kill you all." Federal police evacuated the areas around the embassies in response, and an investigation was opened to find the source of the threats.

On 30 December 2023, three men were arrested under suspicion of planning an attack as the country held the Maccabiah Games. The three, reportedly waiting for a 35-kilo parcel from Yemen, were suspected to be part of a terror cell, and they rented rooms in a hotel which was no more than two blocks away from the Israeli embassy. The three men were released after a judge concluded that there was no evidence for the accusations against them.

=== Brazil ===
On 8 November 2023, Brazilian authorities announced they had arrested two suspects in a Hezbollah-backed terror plot to attack synagogues and other Jewish targets in the country.

== Impact on immigration to Israel ==
Soon after the war began, Israeli immigration minister Ofir Sofer stated that Israel is expecting a large wave of Jews migrating to the country due to rising antisemitism. In 2024, immigration from some countries like France increased compared to 2023. However, the Israeli government reported that overall immigration declined from approximately 63,000 people in 2022 to 47,200 in 2023 and 32,297 in 2024. In the first half of 2025, the decrease in immigration continued.

According to Israeli demographer Sergio Della Pergola, the main driver of immigration to Israel is standard of living, not antisemitism. Due to the ongoing Middle Eastern crisis (2023–present), safety in Israel has become a greater concern. Russian immigration to Israel increased in 2022 due to the Russian invasion of Ukraine but has since returned to pre-war levels.

== See also ==
- New antisemitism
- Timeline of antisemitism in the 21st century
- Anti-Palestinian racism during the Gaza war
- Violent incidents in reaction to the Gaza war
- Islamophobia during the Gaza war
- Antisemitism during the 2026 Iran war
- Antisemitism by country
- Antisemitism in Islam
- Antisemitism in the Arab world
- US Congress hearings on campus antisemitism during the Gaza war
- Holocaust inversion
- Denial of the October 7 attacks
- Normalization of antisemitism
- Spiritually Israeli
