= Iranian assassination plot of ASMLA leadership in Denmark =

Ringsted terror plot
- Location: Ringsted, Denmark
- Date: October 2018 (CET)
- Target: ASMLA
- Attack type: Assassination
- Deaths: 0
- Injuries: 0

The assassination of ASMLA leadership was an alleged Iranian plot which took place in October 2018, when a Norwegian citizen of Iranian descent was arrested and suspected of having planned Iranian intelligence operations in Denmark. Both the Norwegian PST and the Danish PET also suspected the man to take part in the planning of an alleged assassination against the leader of the Iranian group Arab Struggle Movement for the Liberation of Ahvaz. He was arrested in Gothenburg on 21 October 2018. Denmark called for EU sanctions against Iran as a result. Tehran denied the allegation and raised suspicion over the timing of the incident, saying that the plot was devised to damage Iran-Europe relations at a critical time.

== Accusations of spying and assassination attempt ==
Denmark's security services accused Iranian intelligence service of plotting an assassination on Danish territory. Danish police believe the Norwegian citizen observed and photographed outside the residence of a Danish-Iranian leader of the Iranian separatist movement ASMLA (an organization that fights for independence for the Arabian-Iranian province Khuzestan). The search for the suspect led to a major security operation between Denmark and Sweden, including closing Denmark's borders. According to the Jerusalem Post, the suspect was found with photos of houses and apartments of ASMLA dissidents.

On October 21, 2018, a Norwegian citizen of Iranian descent was arrested on suspicion of helping Iranian intelligence service "to act in Denmark" and planning to kill an ASMLA member. Danish prime minister Lars Løkke Rasmussen protested the alleged assassination plot in social media.

According to the PET chief, there is reason to believe that the detained who now is in custody, has observed and photographed the leader of ASMLA's residence between 25-27 of September. He then intended to hand over the information gathered to Iranian authorities and also participating in the planning of an assassination plot of the ASMLA leader, which is stated in a press release from PET. Two additional Arab separatists living together in an apartment in Ringsted, 60km south-west of Copenhagen, were also targeted. Iran regards ASMLA as a terrorist organization. Norway summoned the Iranian ambassador over the incident.

In October 2018, Denmark recalled its ambassador to Iran.

The suspect, as well as Iran’s Foreign Ministry, have denied the accusations. In September 2018, Iran accused Denmark, the Netherlands, and Britain of hosting members of the Arab Struggle Movement for the Liberation of Ahvaz, which Iran considers to be a "terrorist group" and accuses of being responsible for a 2018 terrorist attack in Ahvaz.

In a 20 November 2018 session, the Radio & TV authority (Danish: Radio- og tv-nævnet) launched an investigation on whether broadcasts by the suspect amounted to hate speech or encouraging terrorism.
