= International Socialists (Denmark) =

Trotskyist organisation in Denmark

The International Socialists (Danish: Internationale Socialister) is a Trotskyist organisation in Denmark.

== History ==
IS was set up in 1984 as split from the Left Socialists. It is part of the International Socialist Tendency led by the British Socialist Workers Party. The International Socialists are mainly involved in activities aiming at organising students. When ATTAC was founded in Denmark, IS worked with the organisation. Later on IS members pulled out of ATTAC claiming that the organisation had no substance. As an organisation closely connected to the British Socialist Workers Party IS has a similar, if not identical approach on the Iraq issue, i.e. giving the various resistance movements of Iraq unconditional but tactical support. The Danish media has attracted attention on IS because of this issue.

In 1992, its office in the capital was bombed and one of its members was killed as a result. No perpetrators of the bombing have been convicted.

At its congress in March 2006 IS decided to collectively join the broader Red-Green Alliance. IS however remained its own organisation and continued publishing its monthly Socialistisk Arbejderavis. On 18 January 2015 the IS decided to leave the Red-Green Alliance.
