= 2016 Copenhagen terror plot =

Terror plot

The 2016 Copenhagen terror plot was foiled in November 2016 when a Syrian refugee Dieab K. tried to enter Denmark, but was refused entry and sent back to Germany where he was apprehended and found to be carrying bomb making materials and knives.

== The perpetrators ==
=== 21-year-old Syrian refugee Dieab K. ===
Dieab K. arrived in Germany in the summer of 2015 as a refugee from Syria. After his arrival he became radicalized and studied material from the Islamic State of Iraq and the Levant. He had travelled via Turkey, Greece, Serbia and Austria to Saarbrücken in Germany.

After being refused entry into Denmark, his backpack was confiscated by the authorities and he continued by train to the refugee shelter in Biberach, where he was shortly thereafter apprehended. Police found farewell letters in both handwritten and electronic forms among his belongings.

=== 30-year-old Syrian asylum seeker ===
Prior to arriving in Europe, he had fought in the Syrian Civil War. In September 2015 he arrived in Sweden as an asylum seeker with his wife and child, after his wife had been refused a residence permit in Saudi Arabia. In late 2015, their child died in a car accident and the following year he and his wife were divorced. In December 2017, the Syrian asylum seeker residing in Sweden was jailed for planning to attack random victims with a knife in Copenhagen in Denmark. Previously he had been suspected of an arson attack against a Shia mosque in Malmö in Sweden, but was acquitted. Swedish Security Service had tried to detain him due to national security, but he could not be deported and he was released again.

== Trials ==
In July 2017, Dieab K. was sentenced to six years in jail by the Ravensburger Landgericht. According to the judge, Dieab K. was completely under the influence of the Islamic State and that he methodically was following a plan for the terrorist attack.

In April 2019 the 30-year-old, now 32, was sentenced by Københavns Byret for having brought bomb making materials on a trip from Sweden in cooperation with the 21-year-old.

According to bomb disposal experts, the blast range of the device planned could have injured people up to 50 meters away.

== See also ==
- List of terrorist incidents in Denmark
