= 2007 bomb plot in Copenhagen =

Terrorist plot in Denmark

- Location: Copenhagen, Denmark
- Date: 4 September 2007
- Target: unknown, Denmark or abroad
- Attack type: attempted bombing
- Weapon: homemade explosives
- Injuries: 0

On September 4, 2007, two men who were planning a terror attack were arrested along several others by Danish police officers and Security Intelligence Service agents in several coordinated actions throughout the Greater Copenhagen area. The two men were later convicted and sentenced to twelve and seven years in prison, respectively. In Danish, it became known as the "terror case from Glasvej" (Terrorsagen fra Glasvej) after the road where the convicted ringleader had his apartment, which had been under surveillance for an extended period of time before the arrests. It is unknown if the target of the planned bombing was in Denmark or abroad.

Police, accompanied by bomb experts, initially arrested 11 men and searched their homes. Most were released after questioning, but two were charged and later convicted. The prosecutors described the two as militant islamists with direct connections to Al-Qaeda.

== Arrestees ==
The two men against whom charges were pressed were Hammad Khürshid, a 21-year-old man of Pakistani ethnicity, and Abdoulghani Tokhi, a man of Afghan origin aged between 18 and 20. Six others were released after questioning.

== Investigation ==
The suspects had been under surveillance for an extended period of time and the arrests were the result of a months-long investigation.

After the arrests it was announced that Matas, Denmark largest drug store chain, is co-operating with domestic Security Intelligence Service to keep tabs on the sale of substances that can be used to make bombs for terrorist attacks. Sales of more than two containers of the substances on a list compiled to any one customer is registered by the shop's employees on a special form. The information is then passed on to the police. Matas has instituted the new rules at all its 292 shops across the country.

== Charges ==
The suspects were arraigned on charges of planning a terrorist attack and accused of storing unstable explosives, possibly TATP.

== Trial ==
The Danish court in Glostrup convicted Khürshid and Tokhi of attempted terrorism and sentenced them to twelve and seven years in prison, respectively, in October 2008. Khürshid was considered the ringleader, resulting in his higher sentence. The court said during sentencing that Tokhi, who only had a Danish residence permit (Khürshid is a Danish citizen), would be expelled after serving his sentence.

During the trial, prosecutors said Khürshid had links to Al Qaeda. During searches of his home in Denmark, police found a handwritten bomb-making manual written by Khürshid while at the pro-Taliban Lal Masjid, the so-called Red Mosque in Islamabad during the winter and spring of 2007. Khürshid admitted he later went to the Taliban-controlled Waziristan region, but denies receiving any military training there. Khürshid and Tokhi pleaded innocent saying that the explosives were to be used for fireworks.

It was not clear whether Khürshid and Tokhi were preparing an attack in Denmark or abroad.

On Friday June 26, 2009, the Østre Landsret upheld the convictions of both Khürshid and Tohki.

== Deportation ==
As Tokhi was an Afghan citizen, he was deported home to Afghanistan after serving his sentence. Tokhi commented from Kabul that "the prison in Denmark was luxury comparing to being here alone".

== See also ==
- Glostrup Terrorists Case
- Vollsmose terrorists
- Mohamad Al-Khaled Samha
- German Terror Plot 9/07
