= 1992 Copenhagen bombing =

Bombing of the International Socialists office in Denmark

Coordinates: 55°40′16.5″N 12°35′27.3″E

- Location: Ydre Nørrebro, Copenhagen, Denmark
- Date: 16 March 1992; 11:30 am
- Deaths: 1
- Perpetrator: Unknown
- Motive: Right-wing terrorism, Far-right extremism (suspected)

The 1992 Copenhagen bombing (Danish: Søllerødgadebomben) took place in the offices of the International Socialists (IS) in Copenhagen, Denmark. The blast and a resulting fire destroyed the office and killed 29-year-old Henrik Christensen. It has been presumed to be a political attack, but no one has been convicted.

== Background and explosion ==
The small Danish far-left organisation International Socialists (IS) had an office in Søllerødgade, Nørrebro, Copenhagen where about 20 local members were based. Henrik Christensen was one of the IS members there. The bomb exploded around 11:30 am, shortly after Christensen had met fellow party member Jørgen Lund on the street, presumably after receiving mail. Christensen died from the blast but Lund survived.

== Investigation and perpetrators ==
The attack was a major case for the Danish police and the Danish Security and Intelligence Service (PET). The office fire and extinguishing water damaged traces of evidence and the authorities have been unable to identify the culprits. Detectives have believed that the explosive may have been a letter bomb. Assistance from the British Scotland Yard found no detailed conclusion about the bomb, only that it consisted of TNT. As a result, the case remains unclear.

The IS immediately assumed that neo-Nazis were responsible. Some months before the bombing, neo-Nazis and Danish and Swedish anti-racists clashed during a demonstration in Lund. One theory from the detectives was that the bomb was an act of revenge from the neo-Nazis.

An organisation called Free Denmark K12 (Frit Danmark K12) claimed responsibility in a letter. This organisation also sent threat letters to five other Danes.

In 1998, Frede Farmand, an autodidact journalist known for his controversial investigations of neo-Nazi and sect-like groups, claimed on television that he had been aware of a bomb plot and warned the Danish intelligence about it in 1992. Farmand claimed ties to Albert Larsen, a member of the neo-Nazi Partiet de Nationale. Larsen was questioned by PET and acknowledged having infiltrated left-wing groups but denied knowledge of the bomb.

On 27 April 2013, a former neo-Nazi, Kim Fredriksson, said to Danish tabloid Ekstra Bladet he had information about the attack. According to Fredriksson, a now-deceased Danish-German member, referred to only as 'MS' from the Blood & Honour network, probably orchestrated the bombing. MS was briefly jailed in 1994 after police found TATP explosives in his apartment. He died in 2001 having suffered from cystic fibrosis. Based on this new information, the Copenhagen police force reopened the case.

== Media coverage ==
Danmarks Radio sent a radio documentary in five parts about the incident in 2019. Initially, the reporter of the documentary openly declared that she had known the case first-hand since childhood and until now had believed right-wing extremists were behind the bomb, and that the police investigation had been flawed. Left-wing sources in the documentary claimed police had defined three hypotheses from the beginning of the investigation: The bomb could have been constructed by the victim himself and exploded by a mistake, or part of an internal strife between left-wing factions, or it could be an attack by right-wing extremists. Neonazi sources were also interviewed and claimed the clashes between them and left-wing fractions had been scattered and far from enough to cause retaliation in the form of bombs, and that right-wing groups were usually the ones being attacked by antifascists. The documentary also mentions that, according to police, IS had a meeting with the Irish Republican Army in February 1992.

However, the retired police officer who had been leading the investigation said that a three-point hypothesis never existed and the investigation had been completely open to all possibilities, but ended blindly. As an unresolved murder case, it is still sealed, and the reporter could not be granted access to files.
