= 2016 Kundby bomb plot =

Plan to bomb two schools in Denmark

The Kundby case was a 2016 plan to bomb two schools in Denmark, including a Jewish school in Copenhagen. The plan was made by a 15-year-old Danish girl from Kundby, Denmark named Natascha Colding-Olsen. The police found chemicals to create a bomb in her home in Kundby.

== Background ==
15-year-old Natascha Colding-Olsen planned to build a bomb to blow up two schools in Denmark: Sydskolen in Fårevejle Stationsby (near Holbæk), which she previously attended, and Carolineskolen, a Jewish school in Copenhagen. The plotter was 17 at the time of her trial. An American captain from Iraq warned Denmark, which led to detention of the girl and a 24-year-old Turkish man. The plotter, a recent convert to Islam, wrote on her Facebook page of her desire to help convert more Danish people to Islam and joined a Facebook page for ISIS supporters. Colding-Olsen was described as having undergone a rapid transformation, changing within a few months from a teenager interested in clothes and boys, into a young woman interested in fighting a holy war. She told the court that she became interested because Islamist ideas and ISIS were "exciting".

The Turkish man was not charged in the Kundby plot due to insufficient evidence against him, but in early 2017, when 25 years old, he received a prison sentence, lost his Danish citizenship (he had been a dual national of Turkey and Denmark) and was banned for life from visiting Denmark after being convicted of joining the terror organization ISIS during trips to Syria. He was only the second person to lose his Danish citizenship due to terror-related charges.

== History ==
=== Arrest and detention ===
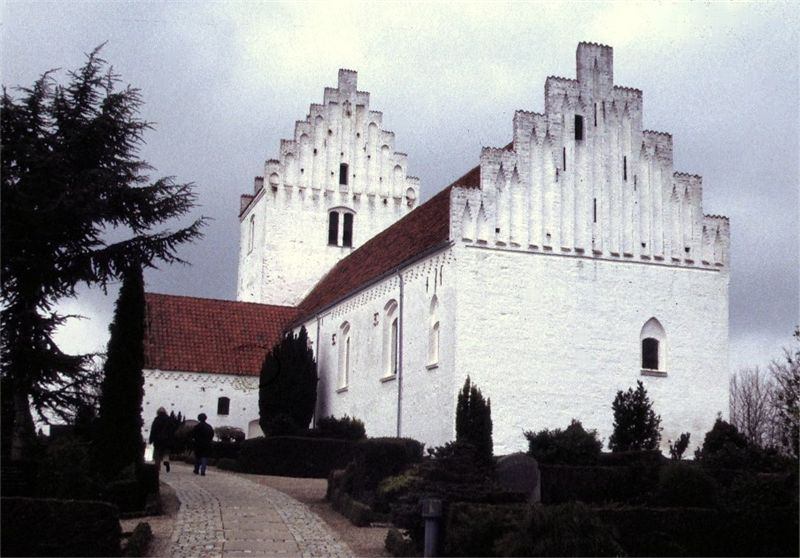
Kundby Church in the village Kundby where Natascha Colding-Olsen planned her terror attacks

On 13 January 2016 police found bomb-making chemicals in the home of the plotter on Trønningevej in Kundby. Colding-Olsen had not succeeded in making a bomb. The plotter was arrested at 12:22 CET. The court in Holbæk placed her in pre-trial detention.

=== Legal proceedings ===
On 17 February 2017, charges of terrorism were levied against the girl. She was further charged with violence after she stabbed a pedagogue in the stomach with a glass splinter from a mirror while in detention. The public prosecutor demanded Colding-Olsen be held in custody indefinitely.

The case started on 19 April 2017. The judgement on the issue of guilt was moved to 16 May 2017 after police found a letter in her prison cell from a man convicted of terrorism. She was sentenced to six years in prison on 18 May 2017.

The public prosecutor appealed the sentence, demanding a custodial sentence without a definite time limit, stating she was too dangerous to be part of society. Retslægerådet (Danish Justice Physician Council) agreed with the public prosecutors. On 27 November 2017 Natascha Colding-Olsen received her final sentence of eight years in prison on account of planning of terrorism and physical violence (legemsangreb) for stabbing a pedagogue.

On 10 January 2019, she was additionally sentenced to 40 days in prison for threats against her former mentor during a phone conversation. On 8 May 2019, she was sentenced to 20 further days for a bribery attempt against a police guard who Colding-Olsen had wanted to give her a phone.

== See also ==
- Terrorism in Europe
- List of terrorist incidents in Denmark
