= Vollsmose terrorist trial =

Failed terrorist attempt in Denmark

The Vollsmose terrorists were three men convicted of attempted terrorism in Denmark in 2007–2008. Nine men were initially arrested by Danish police in the Vollsmose neighbourhood of Odense on 5 September 2006, but most were later released without charges, including a police mole who played a role in the investigation and trial. Four men were charged with attempted terrorism, three of whom were convicted. According to Danish police, the group had been under investigation for quite a while.

Lene Espersen, the Danish Minister of Justice, called the plot "the most severe ever in Denmark" and said the group were planning one or more terrorist attacks against targets in Denmark. It was later claimed that they had planned on using bombs to attack the Folketing (Danish Parliament), Jyllands-Posten (the newspaper involved in the 2005 cartoon controversy), Copenhagen's City Hall Square or another unspecified target. The group was motivated by Islamic extremism.

== Suspects ==
Two of the suspects were released the day of their arrest after preliminary questioning. Two others were released after eight weeks in detention. The two denied any involvement in a terrorist plot.

One of the men, known as Lars, was 33 at the time and had been used by the Politiets Efterretningstjeneste (PET) to infiltrate the group. To do so, he posed as a Danish convert to Islam. The members of the Vollsmose group were children of Muslim immigrants from the Middle East. Four suspects were charged with planning acts of terrorism.

None of the suspects had a criminal record. Three or four of the suspects traveled together around Denmark engaging young Muslims in debates on Islam and Dawah.

According to the prosecution, the suspects planned their attacks due to the Jyllands-Posten Muhammad cartoons controversy and Denmark's participation in the Iraq War.

== Evidence ==
Security services found ammonium nitrate, metal splinters and a bottle containing TATP explosives at various locations, including the suspects' houses. Ammonium nitrate is used in fertilizer bombs. The metal splinters, used to cause more damage upon explosion, were brought home by one of the suspects from a metal workshop where he worked. The TATP was destroyed by bomb disposal experts due to the instability of the compound.

Personal computers were also confiscated. They contained bomb making instructions downloaded from the internet.

== Trial ==
The trials of the four men that were charged with attempted terrorism started in September 2007. Not all information from the trials was made public to protect methods used by the intelligence service. On 10 September, the suspected leader of the group, Muhammad Zaher, confirmed that he, in fact, had been producing the explosive TATP, although he claimed it had been only as an experiment.

=== Defence ===
The defence claimed that the PET mole organized and encouraged the plot. Additionally, he apparently had previous bad experience with Muslims and thereby was not a credible witness according to the defence.

=== Verdict ===
Three were convicted and one was acquitted. Among the convicted, the two leaders, Ahmad Khaldahi and Muhammad Zaher, were given eleven-year prison sentences, while Abdallah Andersen got four years. The prosecutor appealed the sentences of those convicted. In 2008, the Danish Supreme Court added one more year to each of the sentences of the three men. Ahmad Khaldahi is not a Danish citizen and also received deportation from Denmark as part of the conviction. As it was impossible to deport him due to the risk that he faced torture, or the death penalty, in Iraq, this was changed to tolerated stay, meaning that he will remain in Denmark after completing his prison sentence under restricted circumstances.
