= Slimane Khalfaoui =

Slimane Khalfaoui (born 1975, Algeria) was a French-Algerian terrorist convicted of the Strasbourg Cathedral bombing plot in 2004 and sentenced to 10 years in prison. He was married to a French-Muslim woman during his arrest.

== Early life ==
Khalfaoui became a fugitive wanted by French authorities in 1996 for participating in an Algerian terrorist network that plotted to carry out attacks across France and Europe. In March 1998, Khalfaoui attended al-Qaeda training camps in Afghanistan with Ahmed Ressam from Montreal, Quebec, Canada and one of the members of the "millennium bombing". He probably fought in Bosnia during the 1990s.

== Arrest ==
Khalfaoui was one of the plotters of the Strasbourg Cathedral bombing plot in 2000 and was fully correlated with Abu Doha, the ringleader. Khalfaoui and Algerian-British Rabah Kadre, participated in a reported attempt to attack the London Underground, with poisoning substances scheduled in late 2002. He was arrested in France by French police in November 2002 following the arrest of Kadre in London by British police on the same day.

When the French police came to arrest him, he tried to escape from a second-floor window during an early morning raid at his sister's apartment in the Paris suburb east of Montfermeil, but he was overpowered and arrested a few minutes later.

== 2004 Trial ==
Khalfaoui was charged and brought to trial alongside Mohammed Bensakhria and four more defendants at a French court in October 2004. Khalfaoui was sentenced to 10 years in jail in December 2004 for his role in the Strasbourg Cathedral bombing plot.
