= Yacine Akhnouche =

Al-Qaeda member

- Known for: Alleged ties with Al Qaeda
- Criminal charge: Planning the Strasbourg Cathedral bombing plot
- Criminal penalty: Eight-year sentence
- Criminal status: Convicted

Yacine Akhnouche is a joint citizen of France and Algeria who was alleged to having ties with Al Qaeda.

Akhnouche's alleged Al Qaeda associates include:

Zacarias Moussaoui	one of the 21st hijackers
Richard Reid	the "shoe bomber"
Ahmed Ressam	the "millennium bomber"
Abu Doha	aka "the Doctor"

Akhnouche was convicted and received an eight-year sentence for his role in planning the Strasbourg Cathedral bombing plot.
