= Saïd Arif =

Al-Qaeda operative and designated terrorist (1965-2015)

- سعيد عارف
- Arif, as seen in an undated photograph
- Born: 12 May 1965 (contested) (Note: A 2024 EC sanctions document gives three birth dates thought to have been used by Arif: 25 June 1964, 12 May 1965 and 5 December 1969. His wife believed that he was born in 1965. However, he was also reported to be aged 49 on his death in late May 2015. If he were born on 12 May 1965, he would then have recently turned 50.); Oran, Algeria
- Died: 20 May 2015 or 25 May 2015; Idlib, Syria
- Cause of death: Drone strike
- Organizations: (Algeria) Algerian People's National Army (until 1992); Al-Qaeda (1990s-2000s); Jabhat al-Nusra (2013); Jund al-Aqsa (2013-2015)
- Known for: Connection to failed terrorist plots in Europe, leadership role in Jund al-Aqsa during the Syrian Civil War

Saïd Arif (Arabic: سعيد عارف), also known by several noms de guerre, (Note: Names used by Arif according to sanctions documents include Omar Gharib (lit. "foreigner Omar," or "stranger Omar"), Slimane Chabani, Souleiman, Abou Souleiman, Abderahmane, and Abdallah al-Jazairi (lit. Abdallah the Algerian). According to French court documents, Arif lived in Berlin under the pseudonym Jesus Manuel De Jesus Pacheco.) (12 May 1965–May 2015) was an Algerian jihadist. He associated with Al-Qaeda in Afghanistan, Georgia and Syria and was allegedly linked to terrorist cells in France and Germany. Following a prison term in France, he fled house arrest to Syria, became a leader of an armed group fighting forces loyal to Bashar al-Assad, and was killed by a U.S. drone strike in May 2015.

== Life before transnational jihadism ==
Arif was born in Oran, Algeria, the country's second city, on the Western stretch of its Mediterranean coast. He was the eldest of six children born to an affluent family of moderate religious views. Arif's father (Note: Arif's father was named Mustafa according to Arif's wife, and Mohamed according to a 2024 EC sanctions document. Because Mohamed is a very common name among Arabs, it is also common for Arabs with that first name to be known informally by a second or middle name. However, it is not known if this was the case with Arif's father.) had fought against the French in the Algerian War of Independence before becoming a policeman, and later taking a job at an oil refinery. His mother's name was Saliha Boukhari. An EC sanctions document lists two addresses associated with Arif, one in Oran, the other in Aïn El Turk, a resort town 15km to the north-west.

Arif applied himself at high school and got good grades. He then joined the officer training programme of the Algerian armed forces. He applied to be a fighter pilot, and passed some of the required tests, but was found ineligible due to a minor defect in his vision. In January 1992 the Algerian Civil War begun. Arif deserted his lieutenant's commission and sought asylum in Germany. However, he does not subsequently seem to have had a European travel document under his real name, so it is not clear if he ever regularised his status.

Some secondary sources describe Arif as a former member of the Groupe Islamique Armé (GIA), one of the two main Islamist insurgent groups that fought the Algerian army during the civil war. The idea that Arif had been a GIA member may reflect the fact that other defendants in the 2006-2007 Chechen Network case had been members of a GIA cell in Chlef, 175km from Oran.

Indeed, according to his wife, Arif subsequently had various associations with current or former members of the GIA. However, like other primary sources, she does not say he was a member. According to her he was "not interested in religion" before he left Algeria, never to return. In Germany, he smoked and listened to Pink Floyd; pursuits he would later consider religiously forbidden.

In the mid-1990s, Arif moved to London, and there fell under the influence of Abu Qatada, a Salafi-jihadist preacher who edited a pro-GIA newsletter.

== Transnational Salafi-jihadism ==
In the second half of the 1990s, Arif took his first trip to train with Al-Qaeda in Afghanistan. On one such trip, he met Osama bin Laden. In Afghanistan he trained with explosives and learned to forge passports.

According to one source, Arif later claimed that in early 2000 he participated in an Al-Qaeda meeting in Kabul. Musab al-Zarqawi and Abu Doha, another Algerian, were said to have talked at the lunch meeting, while Arif talked to members of Zarqawi's group, Jama'at al-Tawhid wal-Jihad.

=== London and Germany ===
Later that year, Arif was in London, and asked friends whom he knew from Afghanistan to help him find a wife. They put him in touch with Anna Sundberg, a Swedish convert to Islam and jihadist sympathiser with two children from a previous marriage. Sundberg travelled from Lund, Sweden to London to meet Arif for the first time in the first half of 2000. They were Islamically married that August, in a ceremony conducted remotely, with Sundberg in Lund and Arif in Berlin. Shortly afterward, Sundberg moved to Berlin to live with Arif. Arif told Sundberg that he and a number of other "brothers . . . scattered throughout Europe" were led by Abu Qatada.

In Germany, Arif and his jihadist associates stole cars to order on behalf of buyers in Algeria. They rented the cars using fake documents, and shipped them via Marseille, to Algeria. They lived on the proceeds and sent the rest "to the mujahedeen in Afghanistan and Chechnya", according to Sundberg. During this time, a number of guns passed through Arif's possession, and Sundberg came to understand that preparation for a major attack on civilians was underway.

On 26 December 2000, GSG 9 arrested a number of Algerians in Frankfurt, on suspicion of planning an attack on a Christmas Market in Strasbourg. The police found weapons, forged passports, and chemicals sufficient to produce six kilograms of explosives. Further arrests followed in France over the next two months, including of Mohammed Bensakhria, the cell leader. According to a subsequent French judicial report, the arrested men, all subsequently convicted, did not act alone. According to the report, the men were part of a network close to Al-Qaeda, but acted independently. Arif had reportedly been in contact with Bensakhria's Frankfurt-based cell.

According to an account based on Sundberg's recollections and French court documents, Sundberg and Arif moved to a new flat in January 2001, but remained in Berlin. Sundberg later recalled that during this period Arif received visits from men who had fought in Chechnya. Having previously planned to move with his family to Afghanistan, in March 2001 Arif decided instead to relocate to Pankisi, Georgia, an established waystation for jihadists heading to fight in nearby Chechnya.

According to the French court documents, Arif's phone had been tapped by police since that January. The police listening-in heard Arif's conversations with members of the GIA and the Salafist Group for Preaching and Combat, another Algerian jihadist organisation. During April and May, their conversations centred on plans to travel to Georgia, and Arif purchased equipment intended to be sent ahead of him.

Sundberg took her children to Sweden at the end of April 2001, leaving Arif in Berlin. On 29 May 2001 Arif flew to Milan, where he met Laurent Mourad Djoumakh and Mabrouk Echiker. (Note: At certain points, accounts of Arif's story differ in their particulars. Mohammed Hafez states that following the arrest of the Frankfurt cell, Arif fled to Pakistan to avoid arrest himself, and travelled to the Caucasus only after the fall of the Taliban. This is contradicted by the accounts give by Sundberg & Huor and Lorenzo Vidino. Some sources state that Arif was arrested in Damascus in May 2003 (Hafez) or May 2004 (Vidino). They are both contradicted by Sundberg & Huor and by Amnesty International, who specify 12 July 2003. Human Rights Watch also give the month of arrest as July 2003.) Both were GIA veterans.

=== The Pankisi Gorge, Georgia ===
Arif entered Georgia on a passport belonging to Mourad Djoumakh, who had been a member of Bensakhria's Frankfurt cell. Italian police suspected that the men had spent a few months in Italy before they travelled onward to Tbilisi, Georgia. However, according to Sundberg's account, Arif phoned her from Georgia shortly after he left Germany, and she departed Sweden on 22 June 2001 to join him in a spartan house in the Pankisi village of Duisi. During the daytimes, Arif "went off to the mujahadeen camp up in the mountains." In the later recollection of Sundberg's eldest son, Arif was respected by the other jihadists: "He was not a leader giving orders, but everyone knew about him and listened as he spoke." In October 2001, Sundberg travelled back to Sweden to give birth. Arif's first child, a daughter named Sara, was born on 23 November.

At the Pankisi camp, according to one analyst, Arif developed a "special rapport" with Abu Atiya, the senior local operative of Zarqawi's organisation. Speaking to Human Rights Watch, Abu Atiya later claimed that he "didn’t have much to do" with the men who had come from Europe to the camp, and had never confessed to involvement in any plot to carry out attacks in Europe, contrary to court documents filed in France.

Arif met other jihadist fighters from France including Menad Benchellali, who would go on to return to France and lead the so-called Chechen Network, including Arif, in developing a number of unrealised terrorist plots. French court documents cited by Human Rights Watch claimed that Arif, along with the other defendants Chechen Network trial, had not crossed the border to fight in Chechnya. However, Arif told his wife in Spring 2002 that he had "been to Chechnya with the mujahedeen" since she had left Pankisi.

A French court later found that in March 2002 Arif had been in Barcelona at the time of a meeting of leading jihadists, held to define a new strategy for Europe. In April he arrived in Sweden to stay briefly with his wife, and met his daughter for the first time, before departing back to Pankisi.

From August 2002, under U.S. and Russian pressure, Georgia begun to place pressure of its own on the jihadists and Chechen separatists who had been holed up in Pankisi to leave. Many left over the following months. A small group of around 50 Arab fighters was reported to have remained, however, some through the summer of the next year.

It is not clear when Arif left Pankisi. But according to Sundberg, Arif travelled from Georgia to Syria via Iran. Arif was joined in Damascus by his wife, who departed Sweden in late May 2003. In Sundberg's, account Arif had wanted to move somewhere "where there was not too long a journey to the fronts of jihad." Her understanding was that Syria's "long border with Iraq was good for Saïd's plans."

=== Syria, extradition to France and Chechen Network Trial ===
Arif was arrested in Damascus on 12 July 2003, and held in the notorious Palestine Branch detention facility. He later described the conditions of his detention:

I was held on premises of the Syrian secret service for one year in inhuman conditions. I was in an individual cell 1 meter by 1.9 meters, with a ceiling of 2 meters, in total darkness. I slept on the dirty floor, without access to medical care. I couldn’t talk or had no notion of time, and I was hit time and again. During the winter I did not have heating or hot water . . . that year in detention in Damascus, I was tortured with a television cable, and they had put me in a tire, which affected my spinal column. Getting slapped was the least of the abuse I suffered . . . I was forced to admit facts I didn’t know, ignoring, up until the last day of my detention, that there was an international inquiry commission and without the assistance of a lawyer.

Arif's second child (Sundberg's fourth), Khaled, was born in Sweden in March 2004, while Arif was in prison. He was extradited to France on 17 June 2004. He was placed on trial as part of the Chechen Network case, alongside 26 other defendants. He was said by prosecutors to be one of five "order givers" in the network. The court accepted that statements made by Arif during detention in Syria were likely extracted under torture, but nonetheless convicted him. Many of the others who made statements on which the prosecution's case relied also retracted those statements, citing physical or psychological pressure.

For instance, the court's verdict cited Abu Atiya's confession to officers of Jordan's General Intelligence Department. Atiya later told Human Rights Watch that he had been given unidentified pills and injections during his interrogations in Jordan, had been subject to sleep deprivation, and hadn't been allowed to read his confession before he signed it.

Arif was convicted on 14 June 2006, and sentenced to nine years with a two-thirds "security period" alongside Benchellali and other associates of the Chechen Network. Arif was sentenced to nine years. He appealed, but in 2007 the court not only confirmed the verdict but increased his sentence by one year.

=== House arrest and escape attempts ===
Arif was released in 2011, to be placed under house arrest in Millau, because the European Court of Human Rights forbade his expulsion to Algeria, due to the risk of torture there. In January 2012, he escaped from house arrest and fled to Sweden, where he later claimed to have been searching for his children.

He was caught, then incarcerated at the Seysses Remand Centre near Toulouse. Arif's sentence for breaching the conditions of his house arrest was revised downwards, to six months, in June 2012. He was released from prison in October 2012, once again to house arrest. This time, he was given lodgings at a hostel in Brioude.

While there, Arif gave an interview to the Tunisian newspaper Le Renouveau, in which he said that "suicide attacks with an economic dimension are the best means of fighting for Islamists." He added that, "with a car bomb, you kill 150 to 200 people." The statement was condemned by a local legislator and the local prosecutor summoned Arif to appear before a court on 14 May 2013, on charges of condoning and inciting crime.

However, two days before Arif was due to appear in court, he stole a car belonging to the wife of the owner of the hostel and absconded. He evaded police roadblocks thrown up to catch him, appears to have found his way onto a motorway headed toward Belgium, and ultimately made his way to Syria. The hostel owner nonetheless described Arif's decision to empty the car of his wife's personal belongings before stealing it as "classy." France issued an international arrest warrant for Arif in the form of an Interpol Red Notice.

== The Syrian civil war and death ==
It is not clear when Arif arrived in Syria for the second time, but it may have been October 2013, the month in which he is alleged to have joined Jabhat al-Nusra. The Syrian Civil War was then already well underway, and Jabhat al-Nusra, was at the time was one of two affiliates of Al-Qaeda operating in Syria. The other, the Islamic State organisation, publicly split with Al-Qaeda in early 2014, and was by then engaged in direct armed combat with Al-Nusra.

Arif was subsequently reported to have joined Jund al-Aqsa, and became its military leader. Jund al-Aqsa was publicly an entirely separate organisation, but in reality had been covertly founded by Al-Nusra leader Ahmed al-Sharaa in early 2013, in order to provide an organisational vehicle for foreign fighters sympathetic to Al-Nusra. Al-Sharaa - then still operating under his nom de guerre, Abu Mohammed al-Jolani - was trying to orientate Al-Nusra toward a domestic Syrian identity and vision, and distance it from associations with transnational jihadism, and the sometimes-wild behaviour of the foreign fighters. But he also wanted a pole to attract foreign fighters who might otherwise join the Islamic State.

On 18 August 2014, the United States Department of State designated Arif as a Specially Designated Global Terrorist. According to contemporary reports Arif was killed by one of two U.S. drone strikes in Idlib on 20 May 2015, while a 2024 European Council document gives a date of death five days later. French sources told AFP in September 2015 only that Arif was killed some time that May.
