= Sid Ahmed Ghlam case =

2015 murder and Islamic terrorist plot in France

Coordinates: 48°47′51″N 2°20′49″E

The Sid Ahmed Ghlam case (French: Affaire Sid Ahmed Ghlam) concerns the April 2015 murder of Aurélie Châtelain and planning of an Islamic terrorist attack against a church in Villejuif, France, by an Algerian national, Sid Ahmed Ghlam. In November 2020, he was sentenced to life in prison by a Paris court. This sentence was upheld on appeal in October 2021.

Ghlam had made journeys to Syria in October 2014 and February 2015. There, on at least one occasion he had met Abdelhamid Abaaoud, one of the terrorists who perpetrated the November 2015 Paris attacks.

== The case ==
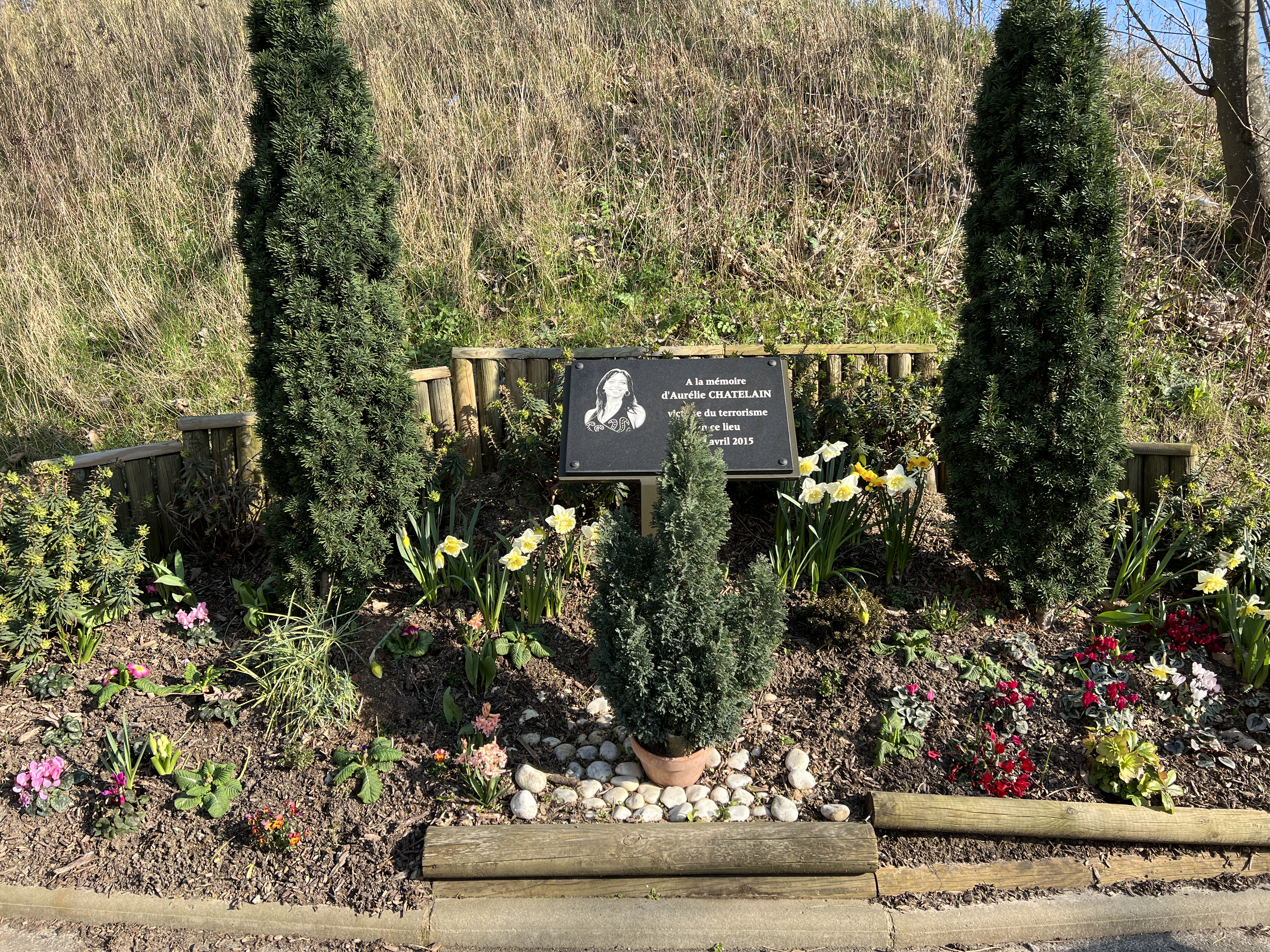
Memorial for Aurélie Châtelain at the location of her murder.

On 19 April 2015, Aurélie Châtelain, a dance instructor, was found shot dead in her burnt-out car in Villejuif, Val-de-Marne, outside Paris. Shortly after, Sid Ahmed Ghlam, an Algerian student, sought medical help in Paris for bullet wounds in one of his arms. His behaviour raised suspicions, leading French authorities to check his Renault Mégane car where they found a Kalashnikov rifle, a revolver and a bullet proof vest. In his apartment, they found three more Kalashnikovs and another weapon. He was detained at the hospital.

Information found in Ghlam's home and on his telephone led the police to believe he was planning an immediate attack on a church, being instructed by a French-speaking man in Syria. Ghlam had, according to the police, been in Turkey in February the same year, and at the time expressed a wish to go to Syria. He had been warned by police when he returned from Turkey, but had not been considered a serious security risk by the authorities.

Some days after the incident, Ghlam was charged with murder, attempted murder, association with criminals with a view to commit crimes against people and other crimes "connected to a terrorist organisation". Le Monde reported that his arrest stopped him from following through on his next targets, which possibly were the two churches of Villejuif and/or the Sacré-Cœur Basilica.

Ghlam's DNA was found on Châtelain and in the car where she died. The authorities have not identified a clear motive for the murder. Initially, they suggested Ghlam might have tried to steal her car. Another possible motive that was put forward is that Ghlam might have mistaken her for an official spying on him. The shots were fired at her from outside the car. Ghlam pleaded innocent to the murder charge.

== Trial and conviction ==
The trial began on 5 October 2020. During the trial, Ghlam said that at the time of the crimes he had “embraced” IS ideology but now regretted having taken that path. The only names he gave to investigators were of people who were already dead. In November 2020, he was found guilty of the murder of Aurélie Châtelain and of preparing an attack on a church in Villejuif and was sentenced to life imprisonment with no chance of parole for at least 22 years and a lifetime ban on entering French territory after release. His lawyer said that they would appeal against the verdict.

According to Le Monde, the trial shed light on the role played by Islamic State organizers and logisticians who aid attackers. Along with Ghlam, Rabah Boukaouma, considered by DGSI to be the chief logistician of the attack, was sentenced to 30 years in prison. Farid Brahami, a third accomplice who had put Bokauoma in contact with the seller of the bulletproof vests, was sentenced to 25 years in prison.

In October 2021, life imprisonment was confirmed against Sid Ahmed Ghlam, on appeal.

== See also ==
- Strasbourg Cathedral bombing plot
- 2016 Normandy church attack
- 2010 Vatican terror plot
