= 2016 Magnanville stabbing =

June 2016 terrorist attack in Magnanville, France in

- Location: 48°58′07.5″N 1°41′21.1″E; Magnanville, France
- Date: 13 June 2016 c. 9:00 p.m. CEST (UTC+2)
- Attack type: Stabbing; Hostage taking; Terrorist attack
- Deaths: 3 (including the perpetrator)
- Perpetrator: Islamic State of Iraq and the Levant
- Assailant: Larossi Abballa
- Motive: Islamic extremism

On 13 June 2016, a police officer and his partner, a police secretary, were stabbed to death in their home in Magnanville, France, located about 55 km (34 mi) west of Paris, by a man convicted in 2013 of associating with a group planning terrorist acts. Amaq News Agency, an online outlet said to be sponsored by the Islamic State of Iraq and the Levant (ISIL), said that a source had claimed that ISIL was behind the attack, an assertion that was later validated.

Prosecutor François Molins said the attacker, Larossi Abballa, appeared to be acting on a recent general order from Abu Bakr al-Baghdadi to "kill miscreants at home with their families" during the month of Ramadan. On 18 June, prosecutors charged two men, on suspicion that Aballa was not acting alone. One of them was released seven months later, in January 2017, under court-supervised parole.

== Attack ==
On the evening of 13 June 2016, in Magnanville, France, Jean-Baptiste Salvaing, a 42-year-old police commanding officer at the Mureaux police station, was coming home after work to his house in allée des Perdrix. Around 8:00 p.m., a 25-year-old man, Larossi Abballa, parked his car 20 m away from the victim's house and hid behind the front gate of the house.

The police officer entered his property at around 8:30 p.m. and Abballa immediately attacked him, stabbing him twice, while shouting "Allahu akbar." The victim managed to flee into the street, where he met a neighbour and asked him to call emergency services and get to cover. Abballa finally caught up with the police officer, stabbing him again several times before barricading himself in the house of his victim. Inside the house, he murdered the victim's partner, Jessica Schneider, a 36-year-old administration worker at the Mantes-la-Jolie police station, by slitting her throat. The couple's three-year-old child remained unharmed.

Inside the house, at 8:52 p.m., Abballa started a Facebook Live broadcast on his mobile phone while the RAID and BRI police special forces converged on the crime scene and set up an attack plan. In his 13-minute-long live broadcast, Abballa claimed his double murder and his allegiance to Abu Mohammad al-Adnani, ISIL's spokesperson, considered as the leader of the November 2015 Paris attacks. He called for "attacks on police personnel, journalists, public figures and rappers", citing several public figures. He posted that "we are going to make the Euro a cemetery", referring to the ongoing UEFA Euro 2016 football competition, taking place in France at that time. The New York Times reported that "Abballa's Facebook post from Monday night made clear that he wanted to terrify and destroy those he deemed 'unbelievers', people he had come to hate. He also wanted to encourage other lone wolves to do the same." Abballa mentioned the couple's child, who was still alive, saying "I don't know what I am going to do with him yet." On the scene, police teams evacuated and locked-down the area around the house. The RAID special unit attempted to negotiate with Abballa. During these negotiations, Abballa said he was a practicing Muslim, that he was observing Ramadan, and that he swore allegiance three weeks earlier to ISIL leader Abu Bakr Al-Baghdadi. He also said he answered a call from Al-Baghdadi to "kill the infidels, at their homes with their families".

Later in the night, after unsuccessful attempts at negotiating with the suspect, and threats from the suspect to "blow the place up if the police tried to break in", the RAID assault team, along with BRI officers, entered the house around 12:00 a.m. and killed Abballa in a firefight. They retrieved the body of Jessica Schneider and the dead couple's three-year-old son, who was alive but in shock.

== Perpetrator ==
Abballa was a French citizen of Moroccan descent from the suburb of Mantes-la-Jolie. He was born in Meulan, France. Abballa had a police record for theft and violence by 2011. In that year, Abballa, then age 20, was arrested for his participation in a group that recruited would-be jihadis to go to Pakistan and Afghanistan for training. Abballa and seven other men were convicted in Paris in 2013 for their involvement in the plot; Abballa was convicted of "criminal association with the aim of preparing terrorist acts."

On 30 September 2013, Abballa was sentenced to three years in prison, six months of which were suspended. As he had already spent two years and two months in jail awaiting trial, he was released after being sentenced. Abballa was under surveillance for several years after his release, but this monitoring ended in 2015. The New York Times described the attack as "tied to the Islamic State," citing al-Adnani's pre-Ramadan speech urging attacks on Europe and the United States.

== Court proceedings ==
On 18 June, prosecutors charged two men, Mohamed Lamine Aberouz (aka Charaf-Din Aberouz) and Saad Rajraji, who had been convicted in 2013 of "being part of a French jihadist group," on suspicion that Abballa "wasn't acting alone." Rajraji was released in January 2017, under court-supervised parole. Aberouz was convicted in October 2023 of complicity in the two murders in Magnanville.

== Reactions ==
French President François Hollande said the attack was "unquestionably" terrorism.

French Prime Minister Manuel Valls said on France Inter radio: "I said we were at war, that this war will take a generation, that it will be long."

On 3 August 2016, both victims were posthumously knighted with the Légion d'honneur, the highest French order of merit.

== Similar attacks ==
In February 2017, The New York Times reported that the Magnanville attack was part of a group at least other four knife attacks in France in a span of 13 months, including the Louvre machete attack of 2017, the January 2016 Paris police station attack and the 2016 St-Etienne de Rouvray beheading attack.

== See also ==
- List of Islamist terrorist attacks
- 2016 Normandy church attack
- Notre Dame Cathedral bombing attempt
