= 2017 St. Petersburg raid =

- Part of the aftermath of the Russian military intervention in the Syrian Civil War
- Type: Police raid
- Target: Kazan Cathedral and other St. Petersburg landmarks
- Date: 13–14 December 2017
- Outcome: 7 arrested

On 13–14 December 2017, Russian security authorities arrested seven members of an ISIL terrorist cell during a police operation in St. Petersburg. The suspects were alleged to have plotted suicide bombings in St. Petersburg on the weekend of 16–17 December 2017, with the Kazan Cathedral among the targets. Both the United States Central Intelligence Agency (CIA) and the Russian Federal Security Service (FSB) were involved in the operation.

== Background ==
Russia has become one of the main targets of jihadists since it began a military campaign against various Islamist groups in Syria. In October 2015, an airplane with Russian tourists was blown up over Egypt on its way to St. Petersburg. In August 2016, two men with firearms and axes attacked a police station on the Shchelkovskoye highway near Moscow. In April 2017, a suicide bomber blew himself up in a car at the St. Petersburg metro. In August 2017, a single terrorist organized a series of attacks, including mass killings and arson, in the center of Surgut.

Three days earlier the FSB had arrested three suspected members of a similar group in Moscow, where they were allegedly plotting attacks during the New Year holidays and the upcoming presidential campaign.

== Raids ==
According to a statement, a "large number of explosives used to make homemade bombs, automatic rifles, munitions and extremist literature" were seized during a police operation on 13 and 14 December. Seven people were arrested. During the operation, the officers also destroyed a laboratory that the suspects had reportedly used to manufacture explosive devices.

The FSB issued a video of one of the detainees being questioned. "I was supposed to make the explosives and... pack them into bottles with projectiles attached" he said.

== Reactions ==
- Russian President Vladimir Putin officially thanked US President Donald Trump and the head of the CIA for helping prevent a potential terror attack on St. Petersburg.
- White House Press Secretary Sarah Sanders confirmed on 17 December that Trump had spoken to Putin.
- Trump spoke to CIA Director Mike Pompeo "to congratulate him, his very talented people, and the entire intelligence community on a job well done!" Representing new US national security strategy, Trump said that "many people, perhaps in the thousands, could have been killed" in this attack. In turn, Pompeo described the event as an example of a positive partnership between Russia and the United States.

== See also ==
- 2017 Saint Petersburg Metro bombing
- 2016 Shchelkovo Highway police station attack
- Notre Dame Cathedral bombing attempt
- Strasbourg Cathedral bombing plot
- Islamic terrorism in Europe
