= Mustapha Labsi =

Mustapha Labsi, an Algerian living in London, England, was arrested in 2001 on terrorism charges, which were later dropped. He was re-arrested in 2003 for the same charges.

== Life ==
Labsi was a former roommate of Ahmed Ressam, and travelled to Khalden training camp with him in 1998.

== Arrests ==
In February 2001, Labsi among ten British Muslims arrested and accused of plotting attacks for al-Qaeda. All ten were charged with "possessing computers, electronic equipment documents, credit cards, false identity documentation, forged credit cards and sums of money in circumstances which give rise to reasonable suspicion that the articles were connected with the commission, preparation or instigation of acts of terrorism", and Labsi was accused of maintaining ties to an alleged terrorist cell in Germany. By October, eight were released; but Labsi and Abu Doha were held and labeled "significant players" in the terrorist plot.

After his arrest, his Slovakian wife was committed to a mental institute.

On March 4 2005, Labsi was among seven Belmarsh detainees who drafted an open letter decrying their detention.

In March 2006, Labsi's extradition to France was finalized. However, France released him, and he traveled to Slovakia where his wife and son had returned. He was arrested in Slovakia, but fled a refugee camp near Samorin (Trnava region) amid decision-making procedures on his asylum application on December 19; he was subsequently arrested in Austria, where he awaits extradition to Slovakia.
