= Notre-Dame de Paris bombing attempt =

Failed attack in Paris, France

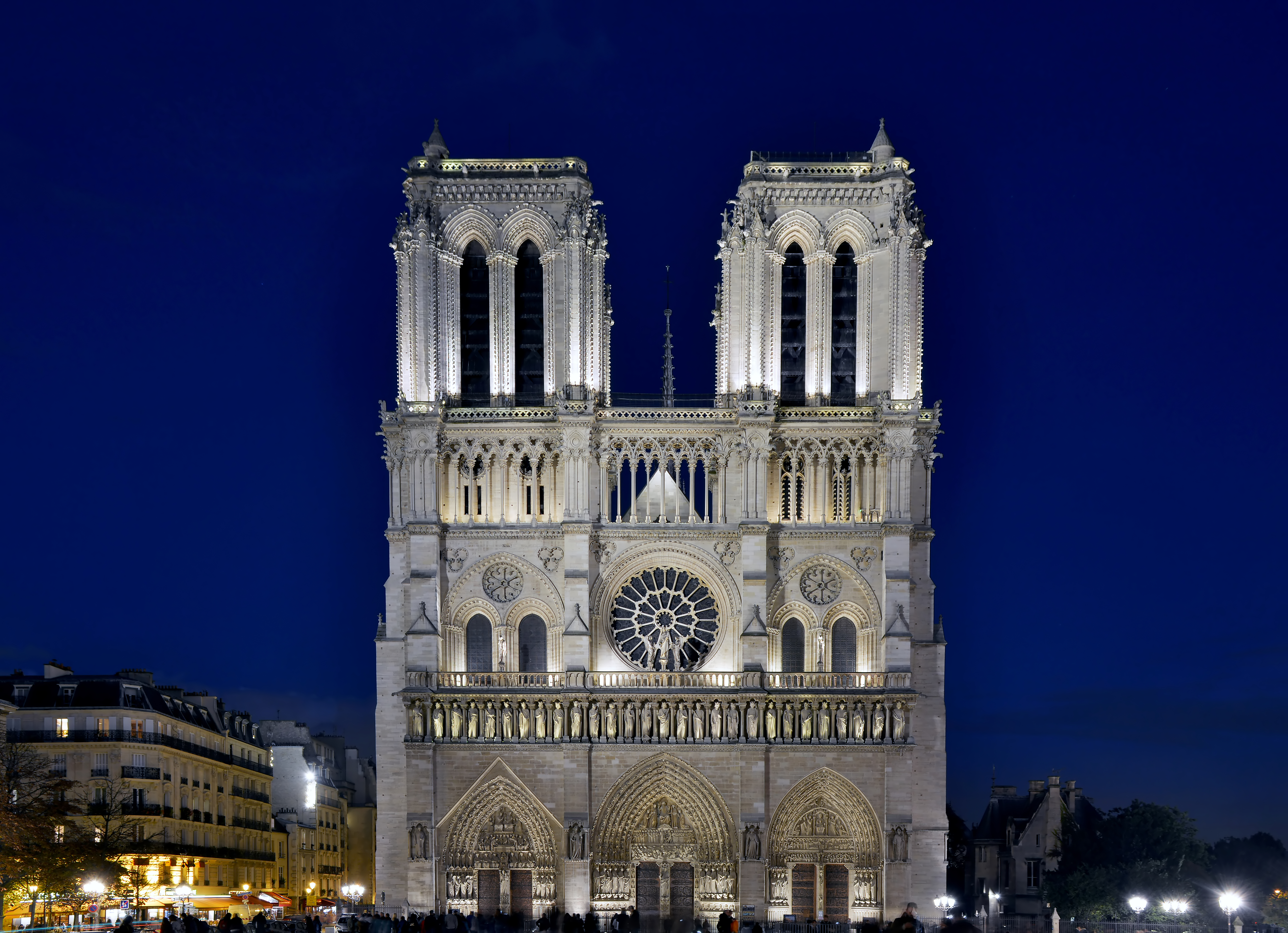
- Notre Dame de Paris by night

- Notre-Dame de Paris bombing attempt (Paris)
- Location: 48.8530°N 2.3498°E; Paris, France
- Date: 4 September 2016
- Attack type: Failed car bombing
- Weapon: Gas canisters inside a Peugeot 607
- Deaths: 0
- Injuries: 0
- Perpetrator: Islamic State of Iraq and the Levant

On 4 September 2016, a car containing seven canisters of gas and pages with Arabic writing was found parked near Notre-Dame de Paris cathedral in Paris.

== Attempt ==
The car that was meant to be detonated was a grey Peugeot 607 with its license plates removed. It was packed with several gas canisters full of diesel fuel, some of which was used to douse the inside of the car. A lit cigarette was used in an attempt to initiate the explosion, however the fuel did not ignite and the perpetrators left the scene.

== Arrests ==
"Information we were able to get from our intelligence services allowed us to act before it was too late," said President François Hollande. Inès Madani, accused of leading the bomb attempt, posed as a man under the name "Abu Souleyman" on social media to recruit jihadis to join her in attacking Notre Dame, and successfully recruited Ornella Gilligmann, a mother of three. According to Gilligmann, she then stopped hearing from "Abu Omar", but was contacted by Madani.

Police also arrested Amel Sakaou, 39, and Sarah Hervouët, 23. All three women were armed with knives. During the arrest, Hervouët, who was "completely veiled", stabbed a policeman. Hervouët converted to Islam a few months before traveling towards Syria in 2015, and was betrothed to Adel Kermiche, one of the terrorists of the Normandy church attack. One of the arrested women was alleged to have had a letter professing allegiance to the Islamic State. Two men said to be connected with ISIL propagandist Rachid Kassim were also arrested in connection with the plot.

== Trial ==
The trial of five accused women commenced in Paris, in September 2019. The accused women were Inès Madani, Ornella Gilligmann, Sarah Hervouët, Amel Sakaou and Samia Chalel, between the ages 22 and 42 all converts to Islam. On 15 October 2019, Madani was given a 30-year prison sentence, Gilligmann a 25-year prison sentence, Hervouët and Sakaou were given 20 years each, while Chalel received five years for helping Madani hide after the failed attack. The Frenchman Rachid Kassim, thought to have been killed in Iraq in 2017, was sentenced to life in absentia.

== See also ==
- Islamist plots to attack the Vatican
- Strasbourg Cathedral bombing plot
- 2017 St. Petersburg raid
- 2016 Normandy church attack
