= 2016 Normandy church attack =

Terrorist attack in July 2016 in France

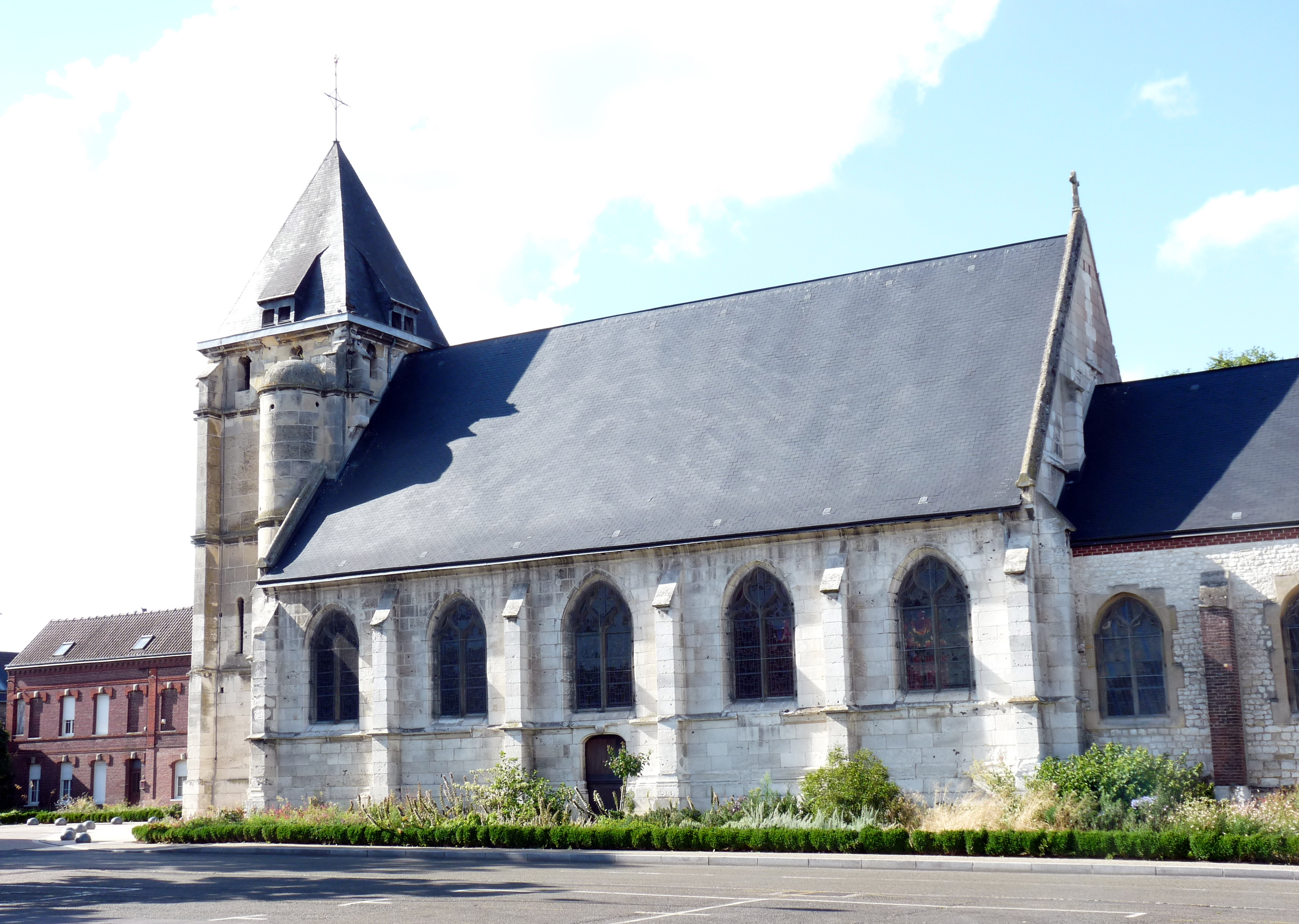
- St-Étienne church, where the attack took place
- Location: 49.382633°N 1.106940°E, Church of Saint-Étienne-du-Rouvray; Normandy, France
- Date: 26 July 2016; 09:43 CEST (UTC+2)
- Target: Attendees of Catholic Mass
- Attack type: knife attack, hostage-taking
- Weapon: Knives
- Deaths: 3 (Hamel and both perpetrators)
- Injuries: 1
- Perpetrators: Adel Kermiche; Abdel Malik Petitjean
- Motive: Islamist terrorism

On 26 July 2016, two Islamist terrorists attacked participants in a Mass at a Catholic church in Saint-Étienne-du-Rouvray, Normandy, northern France. Wielding knives and wearing fake explosive belts, the men took six people captive and later killed one of them, 85-year-old priest Jacques Hamel, by slitting his throat, and also critically wounded an 86-year-old man. The terrorists were shot dead by BRI police as they tried to leave the church.

The attackers, 19-year-olds Adel Kermiche and Abdel Malik Petitjean, had pledged allegiance to Islamic State of Iraq and the Levant, which claimed responsibility for the attack.

== Attack ==
At about 9:45 am on 26 July 2016, two men wielding knives and a handgun entered the 16th-century church of Saint-Étienne-du-Rouvray as Mass was being held. Hamel, three nuns, and two parishioners were taken hostage and ordered to sit together in a group. One attacker wore a fake explosive belt and the other wore a backpack made to look like it carried a bomb. The handgun was later described as an "old, non-functioning pistol".

A hostage said the attackers filmed themselves and "did a sort of sermon" at the altar in Arabic. On the recording, which was later found by police, the attackers also shouted "you Christians are eliminating us".

The attackers forced Hamel to kneel at the foot of the altar and then slit his throat while screaming "Allahu akbar". Hamel had tried to resist, pushing his attackers away with his feet while saying "go away, Satan". Another hostage, an 86-year-old parishioner, was ordered to photograph or film the priest after he had been killed. The attackers then knifed him, leaving him critically wounded. The other hostages were largely unhurt. After the killing, the two men talked with the nuns about the Koran. One also warned "as long as there are bombs on Syria, we will continue our attacks".

During the killing, one nun hostage ran outside without the perpetrators noticing. She stopped a passing motorist, who alerted the police. After police arrived at the church, they tried to negotiate with the two men through a small window opening on to the sacristy. Armed police then tried to enter the church and end the siege, but the attackers had lined the hostages up in front of the door. At about 10:45 am, the hostages fled the church, followed by the two attackers. One wielding a handgun, they charged at police shouting "Allahu akbar" and were shot dead by officers from Rouen's Research and Intervention Brigade.

Within hours of the attack, the ISIL-linked Amaq News Agency said that the attack was carried out by two "soldiers" from the group, in response to ISIL's general call to attack countries of the coalition fighting it. On 27 July, Amaq published a video of the two perpetrators pledging allegiance to Abu Bakr al-Baghdadi.

== Jacques Hamel ==
Jacques Hamel (born 1930 in Darnétal) was named a vicar at the St.-Antoine church in Le Petit-Quevilly in 1958, a vicar at the Notre-Dame de Lourdes church in Sotteville-lès-Rouen in 1967, a parish priest at Saint-Pierre-lès-Elbeuf in 1975 and a parish priest in Cléon in 1988. He joined the church at Saint-Étienne-du-Rouvray in 2000 and assumed his role as the parish's auxiliary priest in 2005. With Mohammed Karabila, the president of Normandy's Regional Council of the Muslim Faith, he worked on an interfaith committee.

== Perpetrators ==
One of the attackers was identified as Algerian-born 19-year-old Adel Kermiche. Kermiche, who lived in Saint-Étienne-du-Rouvray, had twice in 2015 attempted to travel to Syria. He was once returned by Germany, and once turned back by the authorities at the Turkish border. As a result, he spent time in a French jail before being released in March 2016. Kermiche was released after writing to the judge "I am a Muslim based on the values of mercy, kindness (...) I am not an extremist," and insisting that he recited his prayers twice a day and "wanted to see his friends and marry". The prosecutor opposed his release. Upon his release, he was electronically tagged and a curfew was placed on him, requiring him to live at his parents' home, which was near the church, and to leave his house only between 08:30 to 12:30 and 14:00 to 18:00. Manuel Valls, Prime Minister of France, said the release of Kermiche was a "failure" of the French justice. Kermiche's writings were found after his death, in which he spoke of meeting his "spiritual guide" in a French prison, he called this guide his "sheikh", who "gave him ideas". Kermiche's fiancée was Sarah Hervouet, a "convert to Islam," and one of the Paris bomb plot conspirators.

On 28 July, the second attacker was named by investigators as 19-year-old Abdel Malik Petitjean. He was the France-born son of Algerian immigrants. He had been "on the radar of the police since June 29", after he also tried to enter Syria from Turkey. French intelligence had received his picture four days before the attack, but they were not given a name or description at that time the prosecutor's office said. He was born in Saint-Dié-des-Vosges, in Lorraine and grew up in Aix-les-Bains, southeast France. He was a student of commerce and finance who converted to Islam a few years before the attack. His mother told reporters that he had been visiting a cousin in northeast France before the attack and that she did not know how he had ended up in St.-Étienne-du-Rouvray.

Following the attack, the Amaq News Agency released a video showing Petitjean and Kermiche swearing their allegiance to ISIS leader Abu Bakr al-Baghdadi.

== Investigation ==
Police raided a house in the suburb after the attack and arrested one person. The incident is being investigated by anti-terrorism judges.

Police were said to be trying to identify members of a closed channel on the messaging app Telegram, on which Kermiche had posted, as part of an effort to establish how the perpetrators had met. According to French daily Le Parisien, citing sources close to the investigation, Kermiche and Petitjean met on Telegram 4 days only before the attack. Petitjean then travelled to Saint-Étienne-du-Rouvray, 700 km from his hometown Aix-les-Bains, the following day. A 29-year-old French ISIS fighter from Roanne was suspected of having influenced, if not controlled, the two perpetrators from his base in Iraq or Syria, also via Telegram.

Two men, suspected of having been aware of Kermiche and Petitjean's plans, were charged with conspiracy and taken into custody in the weeks following the attack. One was a 30-year-old cousin of Petitjean, and the other a 21-year-old who had travelled from Toulouse to meet the perpetrators in Saint-Étienne-du-Rouvray two days before the attack.

== Background ==
Mass is scheduled for each weekday at 09:00 at the church; Hamel celebrated that day acting as a substitute for the parish priest.

Andrea Tornielli, writing for the Vatican Insider, says "this is the first time a priest has died inside a European church". The same journal cites other deaths of Catholic priests in the West at the hands of common thieves or anti-religious people, as well as attacks by Islamists in Africa and Asia.

Sid Ahmed Ghlam, who allegedly planned to attack a Villejuif church in April 2015, was reported to have had a list of churches which included Saint-Étienne-du-Rouvray church.

== Reactions ==
The French Prime Minister, Manuel Valls, said on Twitter, "the whole of France and all Catholics have been hurt. We will stand together".

Vatican spokesman Federico Lombardi said that Pope Francis was being kept up to date with developments and that he felt pain and horror at the "absurd violence".

The Archbishop of Rouen, Dominique Lebrun, who was attending the World Youth Day in Kraków, Poland, said in response to the attack: "I cry out to God with all men of goodwill. I would invite non-believers to join in the cry. The Catholic Church cannot take weapons other than those of prayer and brotherhood among men". Cardinal Stanisław Dziwisz, archbishop of Kraków asked the participants of the WYD to pray for all the victims of the recent terrorist attacks, especially for Jacques Hamel ″who was murdered today while celebrating the Eucharist in France.″

Cardinal Seán O'Malley, Archbishop of Boston, who was also attending the World Youth Day, was asked whether Hamel could be declared a martyr and confirmed that "it was a question of hatred of faith". The interview explained that "the Church requires that the individual was killed for such a reason" in order to become a martyr. Speaking of the response by Catholics to Muslims, Cardinal O'Malley added "To demonise Islam that's always the great danger ... we have to be very clear we are not painting everyone with the same brush.

The BBC reported that the attack sparked a wave of "prayer, solidarity and Christian imagery" on social media. and according to BBC security correspondent Frank Gardner, "the selection of a church by the attackers ... ... crosses a new red line in the grim history of recent attacks on continental Europe".

Mohammad Karabila, President of Normandy's Regional Council of the Muslim Faith and imam of a local mosque said of Kermiche, "We're not going to taint Islam with this person" and "We won't participate in preparing the body or the burial". The mayor's office will decide whether the body is buried in the town. On 30 July, Muslims attended Mass in churches across France and in Italy, as a sign of respect for the murdered priest.

On 31 July, several copies of the Quran at the multi-faith room of Mater Dei Hospital in Malta were desecrated when slices of pork were laid inside the books. The perpetrators also left a photo of Jacques Hamel with the caption "Victim of Islam".

== Similar attacks ==
In February 2017, The New York Times reported that this church attack was part of a group of at least other four knife attacks in France in a span of 13 months, including the Louvre machete attack of 2017 and the 2016 Magnanville policeman's family stabbing.

== See also ==
- Anti-Christian sentiment
  - Anti-Christian sentiment in the Middle East
  - Persecution of Christians by ISIL
- List of Islamist terrorist attacks
- Strasbourg Cathedral bombing plot (2000)
- 2016 Magnanville stabbing
- List of terrorist incidents in July 2016
- List of terrorist incidents linked to ISIL
- Notre Dame Cathedral bombing attempt
