= Hôtel de Ville, Saint-Étienne-du-Rouvray =

Town hall in Saint-Étienne-du-Rouvray, France

Hôtel de Ville
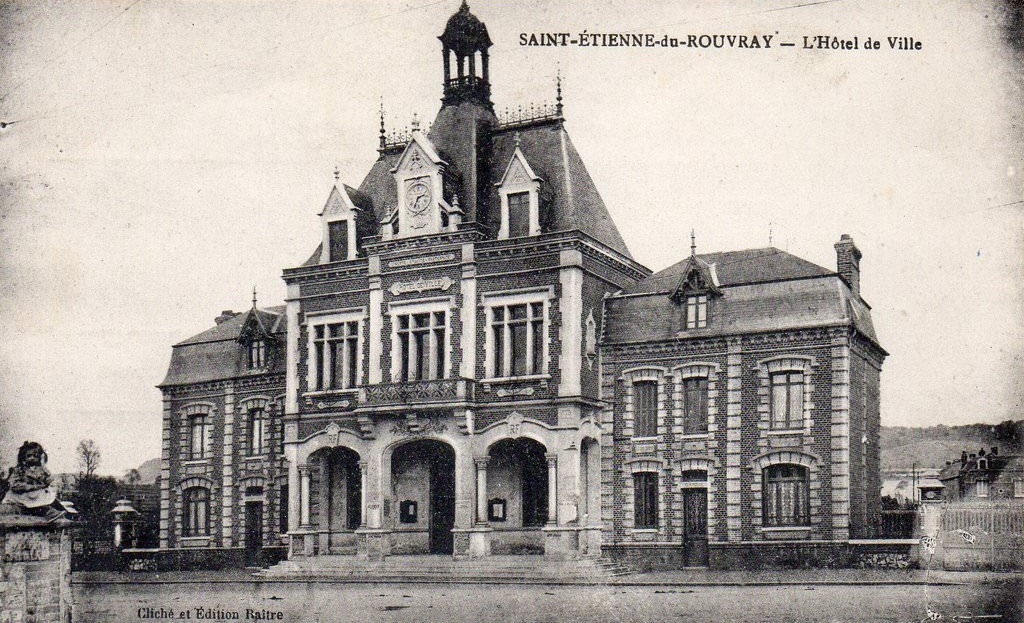
- The main frontage of the Hôtel de Ville in the early 20th century
- Interactive map of the Hôtel de Ville area

General information
- Type: City hall
- Architectural style: Neoclassical style
- Location: Saint-Étienne-du-Rouvray, France
- Coordinates: 49.3798°N 1.1083°E
- Completed: 1902

Design and construction
- Architect: Eugene Lomain

The Hôtel de Ville (French pronunciation: [otɛl də vil], City Hall) is a municipal building in Saint-Étienne-du-Rouvray, Seine-Maritime, in northern France, standing on Place de la Libération.

== History ==
Following the French Revolution, the town council initially met in the house of the mayor at the time. This arrangement continued until the mid-19th century when, following population growth associated with the opening of the Paris–Le Havre railway, the council moved into a building close to the Church of Saint-Étienne on Place de l'Église.

In the early 20th century, after the old building became dilapidated, the council led by the mayor, Henri Gaudel, decided to commission a new town hall. The site they selected was open land to the northwest of the railway station. The new building was designed by Eugene Lomain in the neoclassical style, built in red brick with stone finishings, and was officially opened by the prefect of Seine-Inférieure, Georges Mastier, on 13 July 1902. The opening was accompanied by a grand procession through the streets of the town, the award of prizes for workers of the local cotton factory, and a grand banquet for civic dignatories.

The design involved a symmetrical main frontage of nine bays facing onto what is now Place de la Libération. The building was laid out as a three-bay main block which was projected forward and two wings of three bays each. The main block featured a porte-cochère with three archways. The central bay incorporated an archway on the ground floor, a mullioned and transomed window with a hood mould and a balcony on the first floor, and a clock above. Behind the clock, there was a square belfry. The outer bays of the main block featured archways which were flanked by Corinthian order columns on the ground floor, mullioned and transomed windows with hood moulds on the first floor and dormer windows above. The wings of three bays each were fenestrated by segmental headed windows with hood moulds. Internally, the main block accommodated the municipal offices, while the wings accommodated the residences of the town secretary and the local constable.

A war memorial, in the form of a square-shaped granite column, was created by the sculptor, Robert Delandre, to commemorate the lives of local people who had died in the First World War and was unveiled just to the north of the town hall in 1926. The building was enlarged and extended to the rear in 1961. A new Salle des Séances (council chamber), with modern fixtures and fittings, was established behind the main building.

In March 2025, a homeless man approached the mayor, Joachim Moyse, and threatened to burn the town hall down if he was not given accommodation. The man was subsequently arrested by the local police and convicted in court.
