= Saint-Étienne-du-Rouvray =

- Commune
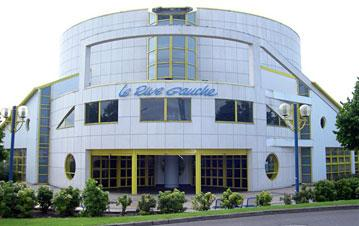
- Cultural centre "Le Rive Gauche"

- Coat of arms
- Location of Saint-Étienne-du-Rouvray
- Location within France Location within Normandy
- Coordinates: 49°22′43″N 1°06′18″E
- Country: France
- Region: Normandy
- Department: Seine-Maritime
- Arrondissement: Rouen
- Canton: Saint-Étienne-du-Rouvray, Sotteville-lès-Rouen
- Intercommunality: Métropole Rouen Normandie

Government
  - Mayor (2026–32): Joachim Moyse
- Area^{1}: 18.25 km^{2} (7.05 sq mi)
- Elevation: 37 m (121 ft)
- Highest elevation: 87 m (285 ft)
- Lowest elevation: 3 m (9.8 ft)
- Population (2023): 29,518
  - Density: 1,617/km^{2} (4,189/sq mi)
- Time zone: UTC+01:00 (CET)
  - Summer (DST): UTC+02:00 (CEST)
- INSEE/Postal code: 76575 /76800
- ^{1} French Land Register data, which excludes lakes, ponds, glaciers > 1 km^{2} (0.386 sq mi or 247 acres) and river estuaries.

Saint-Étienne-du-Rouvray (French pronunciation: [sɛ̃.t‿etjɛn dy ʁuvʁɛ]) is a commune in the Seine-Maritime department in the Normandy region in northern France.

== History ==
Evidence of ancient habitation has been found on and around the site of modern-day Saint-Étienne-du-Rouvray including Neolithic tools (dated to 2000 years BC) as well as signs of Gallo-Roman settlements (200–300 years AD).

A hamlet called Sancti Stephani and dependent on the Abbey of Saint-Wandrille was reported in the ninth century in a royal charter. The village then developed along the road connecting Paris to Rouen. During the fifteenth and sixteenth centuries the parish had five hundred inhabitants. The population grew, benefiting from arable land near the river, as well as rich forests, moors and grasslands.

During the Revolution, in 1790, Saint-Étienne-du-Rouvray was constituted as a political administration. The town began to take its urban and industrial character from the mid-nineteenth century with the beginning of the Industrial Revolution and the arrival of the railway.

The first steam trains of Western Railway Company between Paris and Rouen began service in 1843, increasing the attractiveness of the town for industry. The 1860s saw the establishment of a large cotton factory creating hundreds of jobs, and led to the expansion of the town to accommodate its expanding workforce.

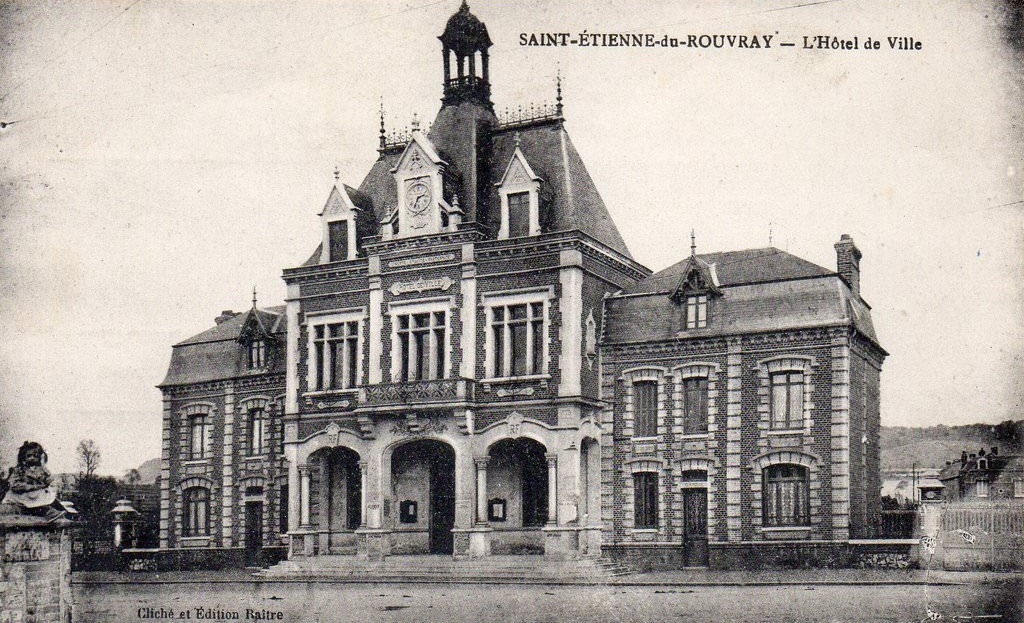
The Hôtel de Ville

The Hôtel de Ville was completed in 1902.

In the early twentieth century, the opening of the railway workshops of Quatre-Mares (1913), the arrival of Camille Cavallier's Fonderie Lorraine in 1916 and the Stationery Chapel (1928) reinforced the industrial character of the city.

Prince Karl Friedrich of Hohenzollern He fought in World War I as an aviator between 1914 and 1917. He commanded Fliegerabteilung (Artillerie) 258, an artillery spotting unit, but flew patrols in a single-seat fighter with Jasta Boelcke whenever possible. During one such patrol on March 21, 1917, he was forced to land because of a bullet in his engine and with a slight wound to his foot. He landed his Albatros aircraft in no-man's land, but while running towards his own lines he was shot in the back and severely wounded by Australian troops. He was taken into captivity, where he died from his injuries on 6 April 1917 at Saint-Étienne-du-Rouvray.

In 1923, three years after the Tours Congress which saw the separation of the communist majority (KIS) and the minority Socialist (SFIO), Saint-Étienne-du-Rouvray became one of the first cities in France to elect a communist controlled council.

On 26 July 2016 two knife-wielding men, supporting the Islamic State of Iraq and the Levant, burst into a 16th-century church in Saint-Étienne-du-Rouvray, took five hostages and killed an 85-year-old Roman Catholic priest, the Reverend Jacques Hamel, before they were shot and killed by the BRI police.

== Geography ==
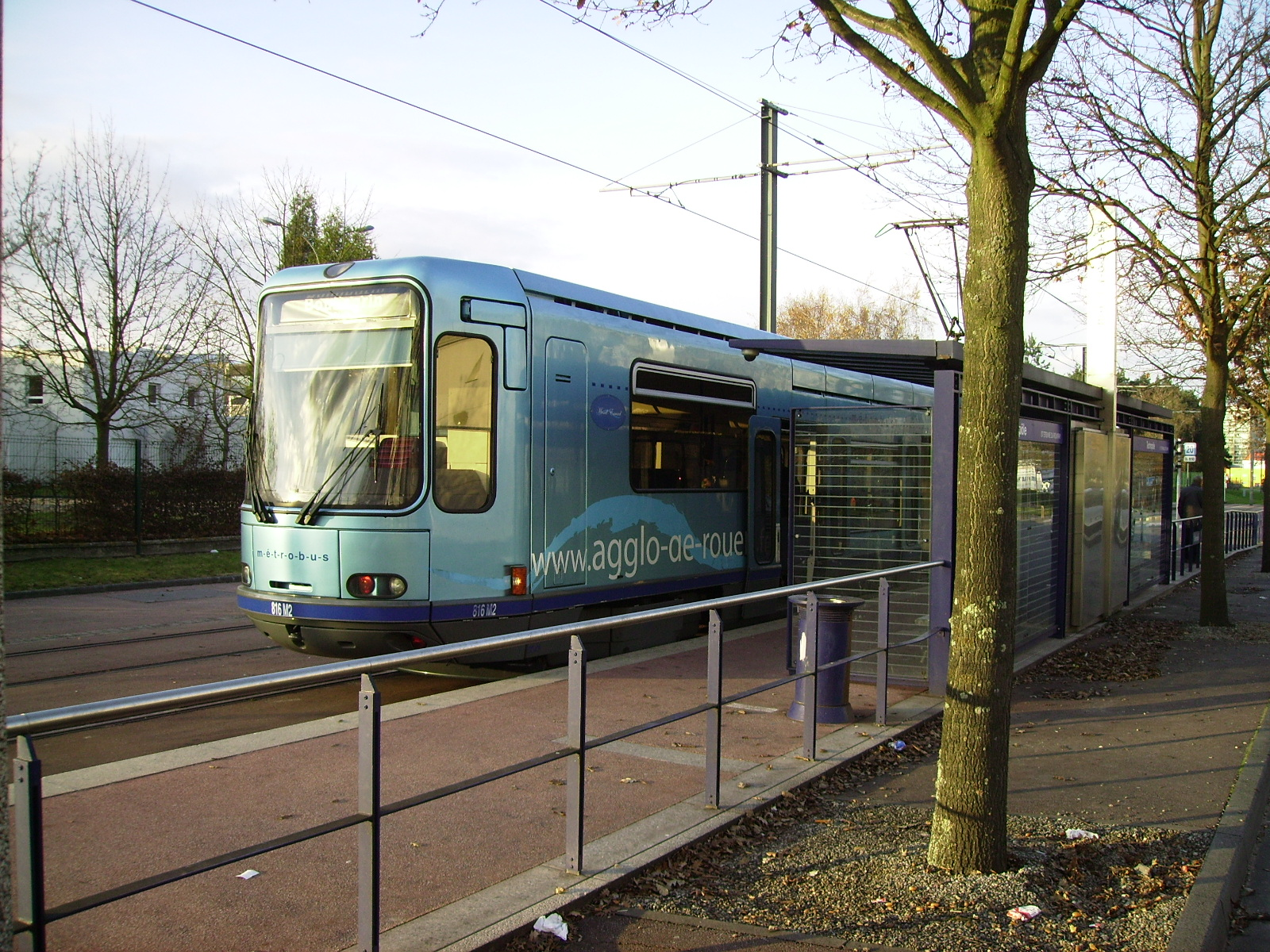
The tramway at the Technopôle terminus

Saint-Étienne-du-Rouvray is a large suburban town of light industry and forestry situated by the banks of the Seine, some 4 miles (6.4 km) south of the centre of Rouen on the D18 and the D18e roads. The commune is served by the Rouen tramway.

== Heraldry ==
Arms of Saint-Étienne-du-Rouvray	The arms of Saint-Étienne-du-Rouvray are blazoned : Gules, 2 leopards respectant Or, armed and langued azure, issuant from the sides of the field, and maintaining a toothed wheel, in base 3 barrulets wavy argent, and on a chief azure a crozier head Or between 2 sessile oaks argent, all issuant from the line of division. (Quercus petraea)

== Population ==
Historical population

Year	Pop.	±% p.a.
1793	1,419	—
1800	1,301	−1.23%
1806	1,326	+0.32%
1821	1,491	+0.78%
1831	1,481	−0.07%
1836	1,494	+0.17%
1841	1,482	−0.16%
1846	1,585	+1.35%
1851	1,547	−0.48%
1856	1,580	+0.42%
1861	1,633	+0.66%
1866	2,197	+6.11%
1872	2,513	+2.27%
1876	2,864	+3.32%
1881	4,246	+8.19%
1886	4,485	+1.10%
1891	4,670	+0.81%
1896	5,145	+1.96%
1901	5,656	+1.91%

Year	Pop.	±% p.a.
1906	6,068	+1.42%
1911	6,448	+1.22%
1921	8,129	+2.34%
1926	9,388	+2.92%
1931	10,741	+2.73%
1936	11,275	+0.98%
1946	10,833	−0.40%
1954	15,430	+4.52%
1962	25,833	+6.65%
1968	34,713	+5.05%
1975	37,242	+1.01%
1982	32,444	−1.95%
1990	30,731	−0.68%
1999	29,092	−0.61%
2007	27,616	−0.65%
2012	28,616	+0.71%
2017	28,641	+0.02%
2023	29,518	+0.50%

Source: EHESS and INSEE (1968-2023)

== Twin towns ==
Saint-Étienne-du-Rouvray is twinned with Nordenham (Germany), Nova Kakhovka (Ukraine), and Gateshead, Tyne and Wear (UK).

== Education ==
The engineering College École supérieure d'ingénieurs en technologies innovantes is located in the city.

== Places of interest ==
- The sixteenth-century church of St Étienne.
- The church of St Thérèse.
- The twentieth-century church of Notre-Dame.
- "Le Rive Gauche" cultural centre.
- The Technopole at Madrillet.
- The fifteenth-century manorhouse du Madrillet, in the forest.

== See also ==
- Communes of the Seine-Maritime department
