= Abdelmajid Dahoumane =

Abdelmajid Dahoumane (/ɑːbdəlməˈdʒiːd dɑːhʊˈmɑːn/; born January 6, 1967, in Algeria) was wanted by the FBI in connection with the 2000 Millennium Plot to blow up Los Angeles International Airport.

== Life ==
A Salafist member, he is considered a close associate of Ahmed Ressam, the two of them having spent three weeks together in a Canadian hotel room prior to Ressam's arrest. At his trial, Ressam testified in 2001 that Dahoumane had helped to build the explosives at that time, but that he had not told Dahoumane the intended target.

On March 25, 2001, the Algerian government announced they had Dahoumane in custody, but would not extradite him to stand trial in the United States - instead they preferred to try him in their own courts as an example to their population who have been plagued by Fundamentalist violence.
