= Magnanville =

- Commune
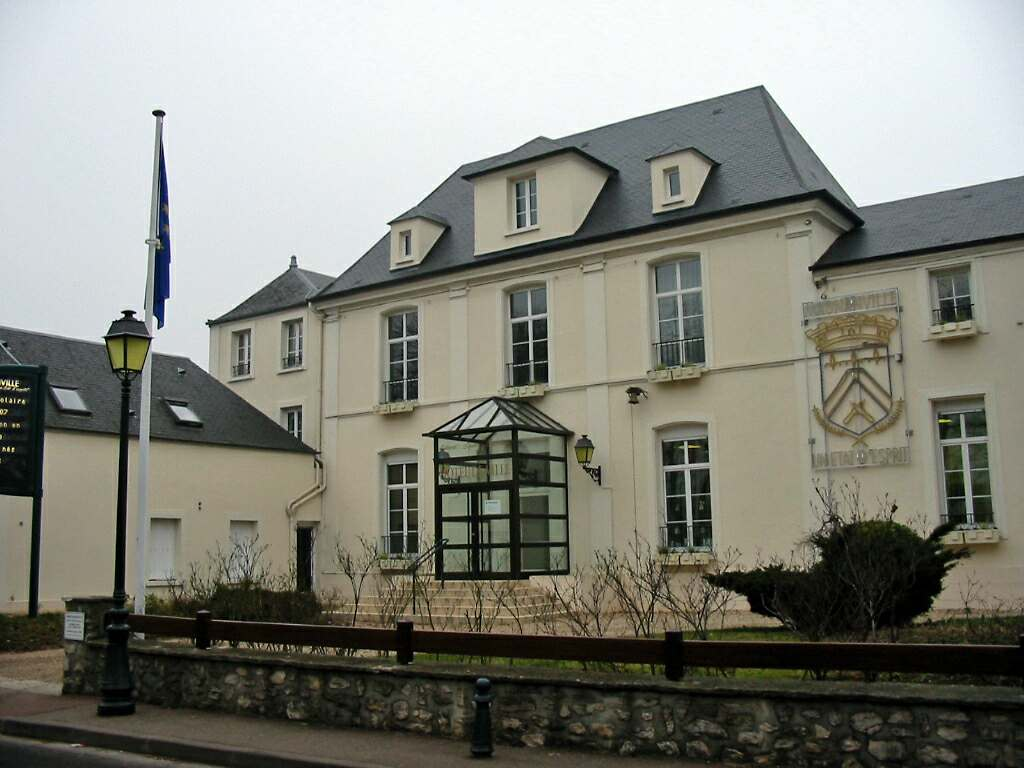
- The town hall in Magnanville

- Coat of arms
- Location of Magnanville
- Location within France Location within Île-de-France (region)
- Coordinates: 48°58′05″N 1°40′58″E
- Country: France
- Region: Île-de-France
- Department: Yvelines
- Arrondissement: Mantes-la-Jolie
- Canton: Mantes-la-Jolie
- Intercommunality: CU Grand Paris Seine et Oise

Government
  - Mayor (2026–2032): Michel Lebouc
- Area^{1}: 4.26 km^{2} (1.64 sq mi)
- Elevation: 123 m (404 ft)
- Highest elevation: 132 m (433 ft)
- Lowest elevation: 65 m (213 ft)
- Population (2023): 6,383
  - Density: 1,500/km^{2} (3,880/sq mi)
- Demonym: Magnanvillois
- Time zone: UTC+01:00 (CET)
  - Summer (DST): UTC+02:00 (CEST)
- INSEE/Postal code: 78354 /78200
- ^{1} French Land Register data, which excludes lakes, ponds, glaciers > 1 km^{2} (0.386 sq mi or 247 acres) and river estuaries.

Magnanville (French pronunciation: [maɲɑ̃vil]) is a commune in the Yvelines department in the Île-de-France region in north-central France. It was one of the thirty communes in the Communauté d'agglomération de Mantes-en-Yvelines, merged into the Communauté urbaine Grand Paris Seine et Oise in 2016.

== History ==
Until the 20th century, Magnanville had a population of only about 100 people. The village expanded in the twentieth century, with significant house building taking place from the 1970s. Archaeological excavations have found evidence of a small agricultural settlement in the fifth century BCE. In 1750, Charles Savalette, keeper of the Royal Exchequer, employed the architect François Franque to build the chateau de Magnanville on the site of a smaller chateau that had fallen into disrepair. The chateau was demolished in 1803, but one wing was rebuilt four years later by Baron Jacques-Florent Robillard, governor of the Bank of France. The chateau served as a military hospital in World War II, and has since become a care home.

== 2016 attack ==
On 13 June 2016, Magnanville was the site of a terrorist attack. At about 9:00 p.m. local time, a 42-year-old police officer named Jean-Baptiste Salvaing died after being stabbed nine times by a man who shouted "allahu akbar" and praises for ISIS. The terrorist then took Salvaing's wife, police administrative worker Jessica Schneider, and their son hostage in their house and later killed Schneider. RAID stormed the house and killed the terrorist and rescued the young boy. ISIS claimed responsibility for the attack. The terrorist was identified as Larossi Abballa, who had spent time in jail for terrorist offences.

== Population ==
Historical population
Year	Pop.	±% p.a.
1968	685	—
1975	3,225	+24.77%
1982	5,001	+6.47%
1990	6,265	+2.86%
1999	5,624	−1.19%
2007	5,505	−0.27%
2012	5,925	+1.48%
2017	6,030	+0.35%
2023	6,383	+0.95%
Source: INSEE

== Notable people ==
- Jean-Jacques Huvé, architect (father of Jacques-Marie Huvé, also architect)

== See also ==
- Communes of the Yvelines department
