= 2015 New Year's attack plots =

International terrorist plot

In late December 2015, authorities in several countries announced the discovery of attack plots, organized by the Islamic State of Iraq and the Levant (ISIL), targeting New Year's celebrations. Police in North America and Europe were on high alert in December 2015 because of a series of terrorist attacks and attack plots, including the November 2015 Paris attacks, and because of information picked up by security agencies indicating that militants might plan to attack public New Year's Eve celebrations.

New Year's Eve celebrations were cancelled following intelligence reports of planned attacks and several arrests in Brussels, while in Munich, rail service was suspended as suspected attack plots were uncovered. In other cities, security was increased amid heightened fears in the wake of the Paris attacks. There were unprecedented security measures in several major European cities, including Paris, London, Amsterdam, Madrid, and Moscow.

== New Year's attack plots ==
=== Brussels ===
Belgian police arrested two men on 27 and 28 December and charged them with involvement in an ISIL-related plan to attack New Year's celebrations in Brussels, reportedly having discussed attacking the Grand-Place. Four others were arrested during raids and questioned but subsequently released. Public New Year's Eve celebrations and fireworks were cancelled in Brussels due to the heightened terror threat. No charges were pressed for planning an attack, but the two men were convicted of being members of a terrorist organization and sentenced to prison.

=== Ankara ===
Turkish police seized bomb-making equipment, a suicide vest and other equipment during a raid of a house in Ankara on 30 December, and detained two ISIL militants on charges of plotting a New Year's attack. A main target was reported to be the Kizilay Square where large crowds gather to celebrate New Year's Eve.

=== Munich train stations plot ===
In Munich, ISIL terrorists reportedly planned attacks on two train stations on New Year's Eve. German police stated that they thwarted the plots after they received a "very concrete tip" around 7:40 p.m. on New Year's Eve from intelligence sources in the United States and France. According to Bavarian interior minister Joachim Herrmann, between five and seven suicide bombers planned to blow themselves up at locations that included two train stations. A 550-strong police manhunt ensued after the possible suspects. The investigation was dropped in February 2016 due to "lack of clues" amid a failure to uncover leads on the seven names given in the warning.

=== Rochester, New York ===
Emanuel Lutchman, age 25, was arrested in Rochester, New York by the FBI's Joint Terrorism Task Force on December 30 and charged with offering to provide material support to a terrorist group. He had specifically planned an attack on the Merchants Grill restaurant. He told the Federal Bureau of Investigation that he had also planned on killing his wife. On August 11, 2016, Lutchman pleaded guilty for planning the attack. On January 26, 2017, he was given the maximum sentence of twenty years in prison.

=== Other plots ===
Turkish police later revealed that they had informed other countries after finding evidence on a laptop retrieved during the Ankara raid of an EU-wide plot against Germany, Austria, Belgium, France, the United Kingdom and Turkey by a group of thirteen prepared suicide bombers who had left the ISIL headquarters in Raqqa. Austrian police heightened security measures and investigated suspects in Vienna before New Year's Eve, without finding "concrete further results".

== See also ==
- 2000 millennium attack plots
- Strasbourg Cathedral bombing plot
- 2017 Istanbul nightclub shooting
- 2025 New Orleans truck attack
