= Shchelkovo Highway police station attack =

Attack on Moscow police

2016 Shchelkovo Highway police station attack
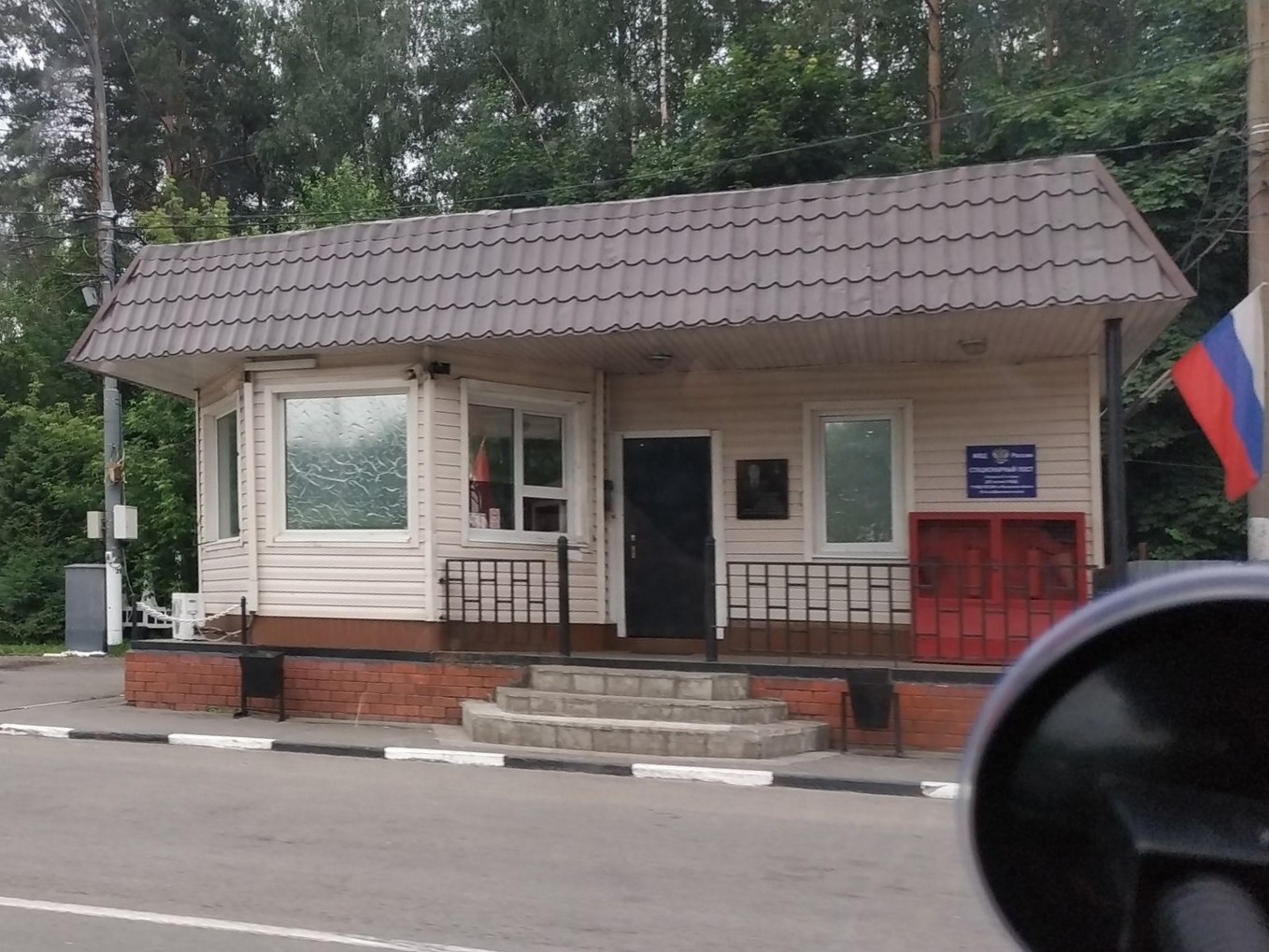
- The police post involved in the attack, pictured in 2019. A memorial plaque dedicated to the victim of the attack is seen next to the post's entrance.
- Location: 55°49′36.2″N 37°53′53.8″E; Balashikha, Shchelkovskoye highway, Moscow Oblast, Russia
- Date: 17 August 2016 (UTC+03:00)
- Target: Traffic police officers
- Attack type: Terrorism
- Weapons: Guns and axes
- Deaths: 1 (+ 2 attackers)
- Injuries: 1
- Perpetrators: Uthman Mardalov and Salim Israilov
- Motive: Islamic extremism

On 17 August 2016, two armed men with axes and firearms attacked the traffic police station on Shchelkovskoye highway near Moscow. Both the attackers were shot dead by police.

== Attack ==
The attack took place on Wednesday afternoon in Balashikha on the Shchelkovskoye highway, 20 km (12 miles) east of Moscow. The attack on the police station was carried out by two men armed with guns and axes. They seriously injured the policeman Mikhail Balakin, who was on duty in the street near the post, and opened fire on the police station building from his service weapon. By answering fire, the third inspector of the station, lieutenant Valery Pankov, managed to neutralize the attackers and called for reinforcements.

== Victims ==
Two policemen were injured. One of them, Mikhail Balakin, died in the hospital later two weeks after the attack.

== Attackers ==
According to the Interfax news agency, attackers were natives of Chechnya. They were not previously known to authorities. Both the attackers were shot dead by police, one died instantly, while the other later succumbed to his injuries. The attackers did not have accomplices.

== Reaction ==
A criminal case was initiated in the Investigative Committee of Russia on the grounds of the crime provided for in Article 317 of the Criminal Code of the Russian Federation (encroachment on the lives of law enforcement officers). The official representative of the Ministry of Internal Affairs stated that the police officers who neutralized attackers will be presented to the state award.

Islamic State released a statement claiming that the attackers were "fighters from the Islamic State" and calling it revenge for Russia's aerial bombing campaign in Syria.

== See also ==
- Terrorism in Russia
