= Strasbourg Cathedral bombing plot =

Foiled bombing plot in France

Strasbourg bombing plot
- Location: 48.5815°N 7.75086°E; Strasbourg, France
- Date: Planned on 31 December 2000
- Target: Strasbourg Christmas market, Strasbourg Cathedral
- Attack type: Conspiracy, planned pressure cooker bombings
- Victims: None; plot foiled
- No. of participants: Four convicted in Germany, 10 convicted in France, British linked suspects

In December 2000, an al-Qaeda-linked plot to bomb the Strasbourg Christmas market, at the feet of the Strasbourg Cathedral, on New Year's Eve was discovered. The plot was foiled by French and German police after a terrorist network based in Frankfurt, Germany, the "Frankfurt group", was unravelled. A total of fourteen people were convicted as part of the plot; four in Germany and ten in France, including the operational leader, Mohammed Bensakhria (a.k.a. "Meliani"), thought to be a European deputy to Osama bin Laden. The alleged mastermind of the plot was thought to have been Abu Doha, who was detained in the United Kingdom.

== Arrests ==
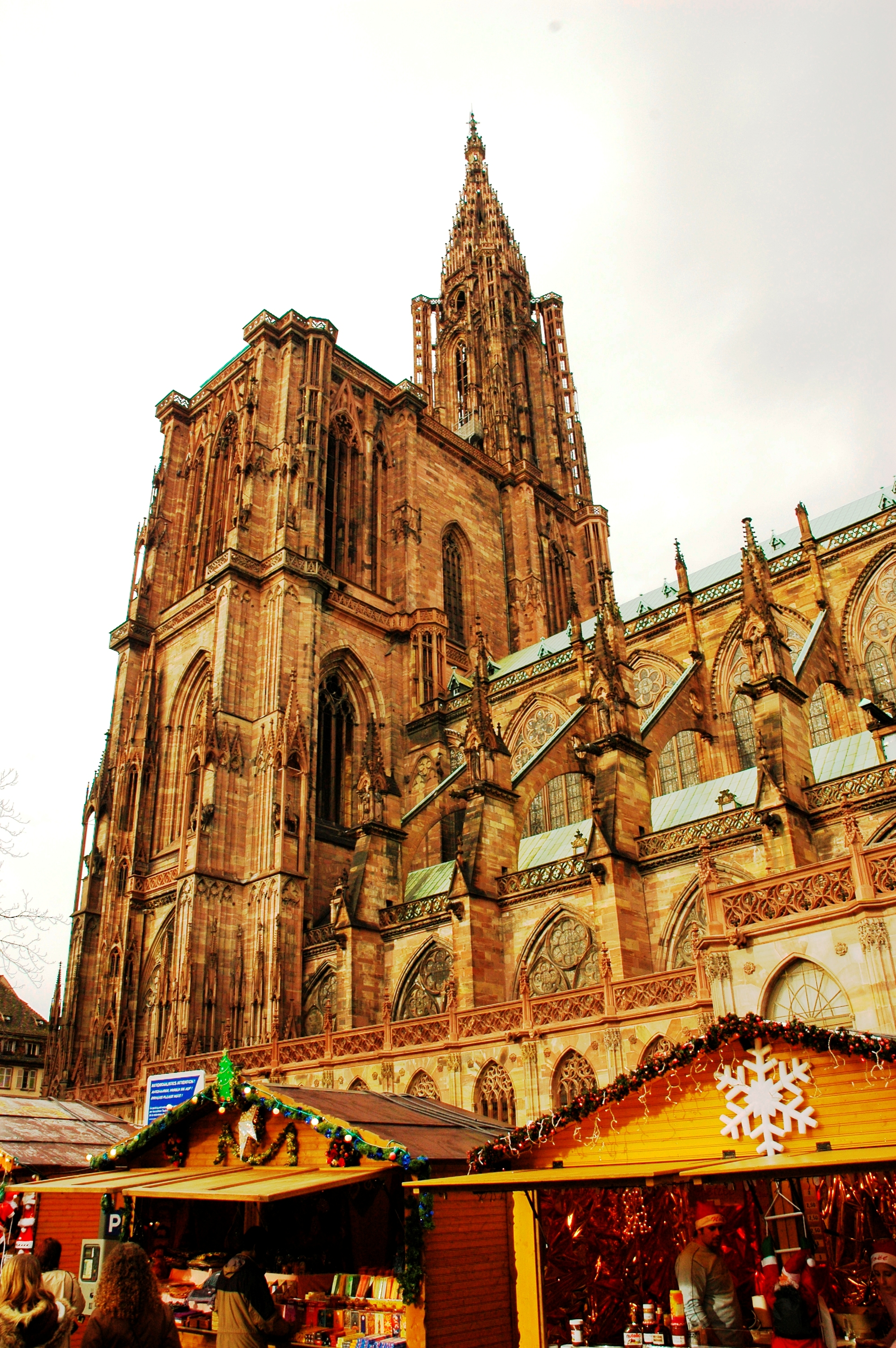
Strasbourg Cathedral Christmas market (2006)

After being tipped off by British intelligence, German police on 26 December 2000 discovered bomb-making equipment during a raid of an apartment in Frankfurt. Four men were arrested. Among the findings were several pressure cookers, 30 kg of chemicals that could be used to make explosives, and a notebook describing how to mix homemade bombs. A video was also discovered, showing a crowded Christmas market in Strasbourg, with a voiceover in Arabic calling the people in the video "enemies of Allah." The voiceover, attributed to one of the suspects, further said "This cathedral is Allah's enemy," and "You will go to hell, Allah willing." The call that had alerted British intelligence had been made by one in the group asking Abu Doha, the alleged mastermind of the plot, for more cash; Doha was already wanted by the United States for his connection to the Los Angeles International Airport millennium bombing plot.

Members of the Frankfurt group were found to have trained in al-Qaeda camps in Afghanistan, to have connections to Islamist networks in Spain, Italy, Belgium and the United Kingdom, and to the Algerian terrorist group Salafist Group for Preaching and Combat (GSPC). The discovery of the plot in Frankfurt led to further arrests in the United Kingdom, where another plot of killing members of the European Parliament was discovered, in which MEPs were to be killed with sarin nerve gas during session in Strasbourg in February 2001. British police arrested twelve people including Doha in February 2001 as a result of the Frankfurt operation. All British suspects were quickly released due to "lack of evidence," although Doha was subsequently re-arrested. According to the Crown Prosecution Service, the charges against six main suspects were dropped for "security reasons," which was linked by others to an MI5 bid to "monitor" the group.

== Trials and convictions ==
In March 2003, the four suspects in Frankfurt, Aeurobui Beandali, Salim Boukhari, Fouhad Sabour and Lamine Maroni were sentenced to between 10 and 12 years' imprisonment. According to the Frankfurt court, the group had planned to blow up pressure cookers packed with explosives, as they had learned in training camps in Afghanistan. The target was reported to have been the Christmas market at the Strasbourg Cathedral on New Year's Eve. The target was said to have been chosen deliberately for its Christian symbolism. Beandali was the only to confess to the plot, while Boukhari and Sabour claimed to have planned to attack an empty synagogue in Strasbourg.

In December 2004, ten suspects were put on trial in Paris, accused of being members of the Frankfurt group. The suspects, all Algerian or French-Algerian, were sentenced to terms of up to 10 years, convicted for "criminal association with a terrorist enterprise" with alleged connections to terrorist networks in the United Kingdom, Italy and Spain. The group's alleged leaders, Mohammed Bensakhria (a.k.a. Meliani, considered one of Osama bin Laden's "lieutenants" in Europe), 37, and Slimane Khalfaoui, 29, were given 10 years, and Yacine Akhnouche, 30, was given eight. Bensakhria, the suspected ringleader, was thought to have fled Germany as he was arrested in Spain in 2001 and subsequently extradited to France. Rabah Kadre, 37, who was in detention in the United Kingdom was given six years, and was banned from entering French territory. The six other suspects, who received lesser terms, were convicted for giving logistical support to the plot by providing false documents to other group members.

== See also ==
- 2000 millennium attack plots
- Christmas Eve 2000 Indonesia bombings
- 2015 New Year's attack plots
- Islamist plots to attack the Vatican
- 2016 Normandy church attack
- Notre Dame Cathedral bombing attempt
- 2016 Berlin truck attack
- 2017 St. Petersburg raid
- 2018 Strasbourg attack
- Saïd Arif
