= Rabah Kadre =

Algerian alleged terrorist

- Born: 1967 (age 58–59); Algeria
- Other names: Kadri
- Known for: Strasbourg cathedral bombing plot

Rabah Kadre or Kadri (born 1967) is a former member of the Salafist Group for Preaching and Combat based in Algeria. He is an alleged mastermind of the 2000 Strasbourg cathedral bombing plot in December 2000 and sentenced in absentia to 6 years in prison at a court in Paris in 2004.

== Arrest ==
Kadre was arrested on 11 May 2002 in London, with two other suspects, Rabah Chekat-Bais and Karim Kadouri, in connection with an alleged reported attempt to attack the London Underground with severe poisoning substances.

== Trial and imprisonment ==
Kadre was in contact with Merouane Benhamed in an attempt to produce homemade poison for home-made terror purposes. Kadre was charged with possessing material that could be used to commit terror attacks such as Paris, London, and Strasbourg. He was charged again in February 2003 in France over an alleged plot to concoct a weapon from chemicals. These charges were later dropped for him. On 16 December 2004, in Paris, France, Kadre was convicted and sentenced in absentia to 6 years imprisonment for his role in the 2000 Strasbourg plot. The short prison term suggest that Kadre played a secondary role in the plot. On 22 June 2006, Kadre was extradited to France. Three other men from central and north London were also arrested on 9 November the same day. Two of them were released on police bail and the third was freed with no further action.
