= Ahmed Ressam =

Algerian al-Qaeda member imprisoned in the US (born 1967)

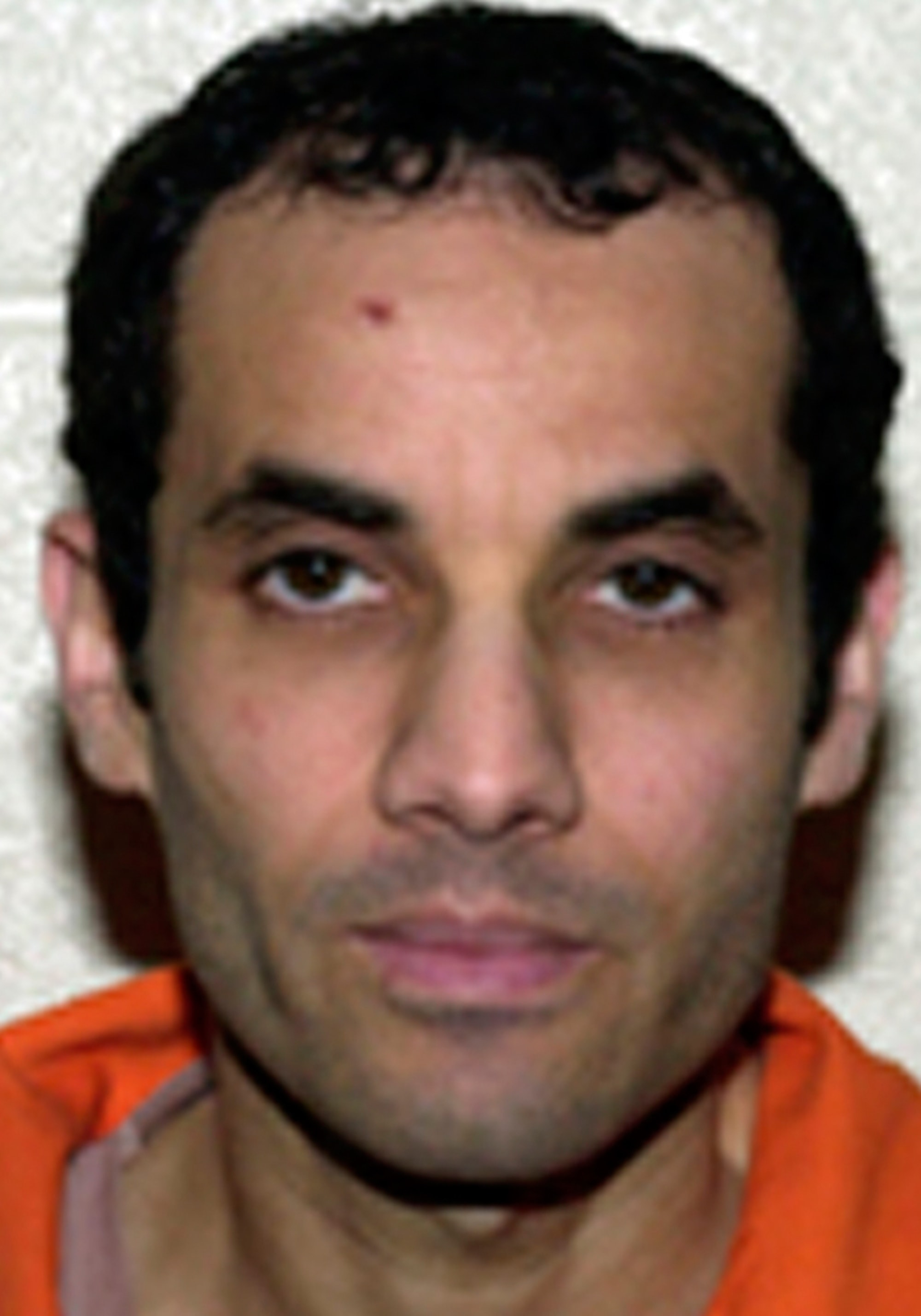
- Mug shot of Ressam taken by the Federal Bureau of Investigation
- Born: May 9, 1967 (age 59); Bou Ismaïl, Algeria
- Other names: Nassar Ressam; Anjer Tahar Medjadi; Nabil; Abu Reda; Benni Antoine Noris; Mario Roig
- Occupation: Thief
- Parent(s): Belkacem Ressam (father); Benoir Malika (mother)
- Status: Incarcerated
- Motive: Fulfill a fatwā issued by Osama bin Laden
- Conviction: On all counts (April 6, 2001)
- Criminal charges: 1. an act of terrorism transcending a national boundary; 2. placing an explosive in proximity to a terminal; 3. false identification documents; 4. use of a fictitious name for admission to the U.S.; 5. false statement to U.S. Customs; 6. smuggling; 7. transportation of explosives; 8. possession of an unregistered firearm; and 9. carrying an explosive during the commission of a felony.
- Penalty: 37 years imprisonment

Details
- Imprisoned at: ADX Florence

Ahmed Ressam (Arabic: احمد رسام; also Benni Noris; born May 9, 1967), also known as the "Millennium Bomber", is an Algerian al-Qaeda member who lived for a time in Montreal, Quebec, Canada. He received extensive terrorist training in Afghanistan.

He was convicted in 2001 of planning to bomb the Los Angeles International Airport (LAX) on New Year's Eve 1999, as part of the foiled 2000 millennium attack plots. He was initially sentenced to 22 years in prison, after cooperating with the government in testifying about al-Qaeda and associated terrorist networks. In 2010, an appellate court held his sentence to be too lenient, and ordered that it be extended. In 2012, he was re-sentenced to 37 years' imprisonment. He is serving out his sentence at ADX Florence in Colorado.

== Early life ==
The eldest of seven children, Ressam was born in 1967 and grew up in a town west of Algiers; he graduated from high school in 1988. In 1984, Ressam traveled to Paris, France, for special medical treatments; it was his first time out of Algeria. Ressam failed the exams to college and applied for jobs with police or security forces but was turned down. Over the next four years he worked with his father in a coffee shop.

He left Algeria on September 5, 1992, due to the civil war in the country, entering France on a forged Moroccan passport in the name of "Nassar Ressam". He was arrested on immigration violations in Corsica, a territorial collectivity of France, in November 1993, and France deported him to Morocco on November 8, 1993. It banned him from returning for three years. Morocco determined that he was not Moroccan and returned him to France.

Faced with a March 1994 hearing, Ressam flew to Montreal, Quebec, Canada.

=== Canada ===
Ressam entered Canada on February 20, 1994, using a fake, illegally altered French passport in the name of "Anjer Tahar Medjadi". When immigration officials at the Montreal-Mirabel International Airport arrested him and confronted him about the altered passport, he divulged his real name and applied for refugee status. In his effort to obtain political asylum, he told the Canadian authorities a false story about having been subjected to abuse and torture in Algeria. He was released pending a hearing, and approved for up to three years of welfare benefits. His application for refugee status was denied on June 6, 1995, and his appeal was turned down.

On May 4, 1998, a warrant was issued for his arrest by Citizenship and Immigration Canada. At the time the warrant was issued, Ressam was in Afghanistan, attending a terrorist training camp. He evaded deportation thereafter by using a Canadian passport he had obtained in March 1998 by submitting a baptismal certificate; he used a stolen blank certificate, filling it in with the fake name, "Benni Antoine Noris".

He supported himself by stealing tourists' suitcases at hotels, pickpocketing and shoplifting, and through welfare benefits of C$500 per month. He was arrested four times, but never jailed. By 1999, Ressam had a Canadian criminal history for theft under C$5,000, an outstanding Canada-wide immigration arrest warrant, and an arrest warrant in British Columbia for theft under C$5,000.

Settling in the east end of Montreal, he lived with other Algerian immigrants in an apartment building on Malicorne Avenue, later identified as the local headquarters of a cell connected to the Armed Islamic Group, which had connections to Osama bin Laden. He was recruited into al-Qaeda. According to Canadian Security Intelligence Service officials, he was under surveillance as part of an investigation into a suspected terrorist ring from 1996 until he left the country.

== Terrorist training in Afghanistan ==
Ressam became friends with Raouf Hannachi, an al-Qaeda member who served as the muezzin at Montreal's Assuna Mosque. Hannachi returned to Montreal from Afghanistan toward the end of the summer of 1997, where he had trained for jihad at Khalden Camp. He told Ressam about the experience and jihad, encouraged him to train as well, and ultimately arranged a trip to the camp for him and his roommate Mustapha Labsi.

On March 17, 1998 Ressam, interested in joining jihad in Afghanistan, traveled from Montreal to Karachi, Pakistan using his fraudulent "Benni Noris" passport. There, he contacted al-Qaeda leader Abu Zubaydah in Peshawar, who was thought to supervise Afghan terrorist training camps funded and organized by Bin Laden. Abu Zubaydah arranged for Ressam to be transported over the Khyber Pass into Afghanistan in April.

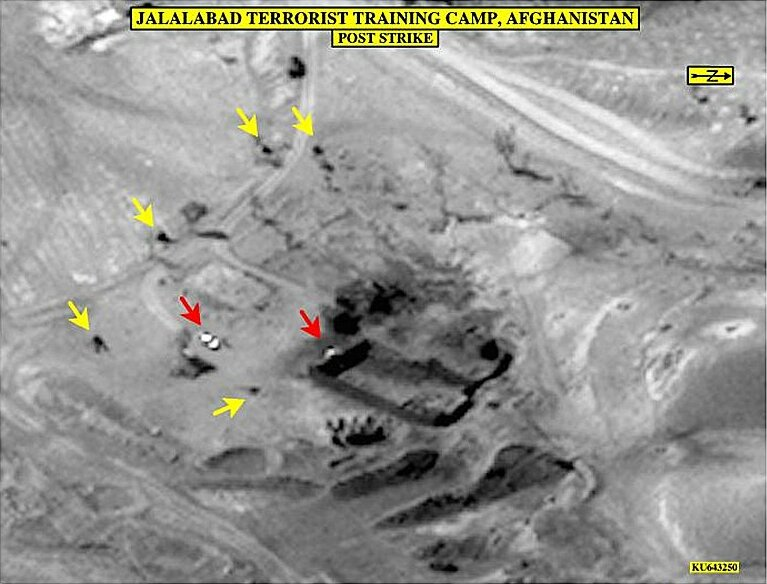
Derunta training camp, after U.S. bombardment

Using the alias "Nabil", Ressam attended three camps for Islamic terrorists between March 1998 and February 1999. At Khalden Camp, which generally hosted 50–100 trainees at any time, he trained in light weapons, handguns, small machine guns, rocket-propelled grenade launchers (RPGs), explosives (including TNT, C4 plastic explosives, and black plastic explosives), poisons (including cyanide), poison gas, sabotage, target selection, urban warfare, tactics (including assassinations), and security. Trainees were from Jordan, Algeria, Yemen, Saudi Arabia, Chechnya, Turkey, Sweden, Germany, and France. During the five to six months he was there, he met Zacarias Moussaoui, later associated with the 9/11 attacks in the United States. He trained for six weeks in how to manufacture advanced explosives and make electronic circuits at Derunta training camp, outside Jalalabad, Afghanistan.

Abu Zubeida, in contrast, testified before his Combatant Status Review Tribunal that Khalden only trained fighters for "defensive jihad". He said trainees were explicitly instructed to attack only military targets, that it was an offense against Islam to kill or injure innocent civilians. He said Ressam would not have been sent to Khalden if he were thought to be someone who believed Islam justified attacking civilians.

A six-person terrorist cell that included Ressam was created, and tasked with meeting in Canada. They were to attack a U.S. airport or consulate before the end of 1999. The cell was directed by Abu Jaffar in Pakistan and Abu Doha in Europe.

== Plot to bomb LAX ==
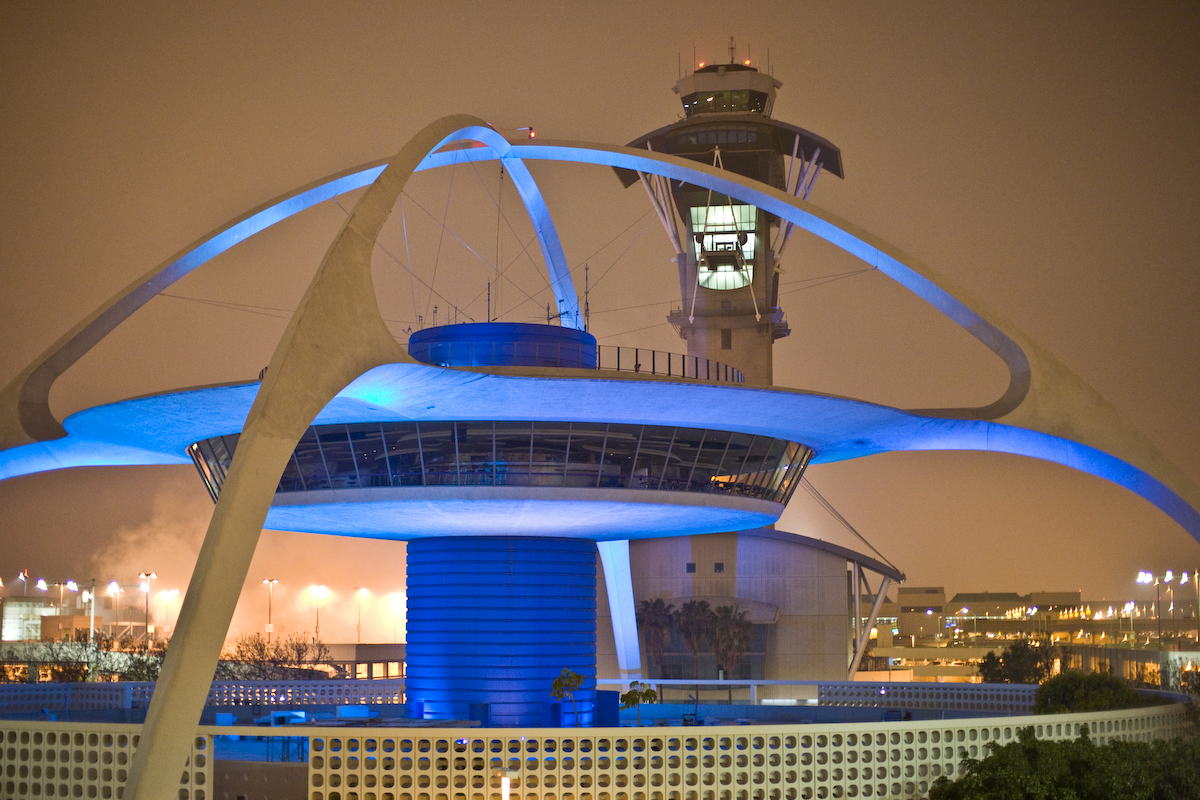
Los Angeles International Airport theme restaurant and control tower

Ressam returned to Montreal in February 1999 under the name "Benni Noris", bringing $12,000 in cash he had obtained in Afghanistan to fund the attack. He also brought in hexamine (used as an explosive booster in the manufacture of explosives) and glycol, and a notebook with instructions for making explosives. While in Montreal, he shared an apartment with Karim Said Atmani, an alleged forger for the Armed Islamic Group of Algeria.

In April 1999, French investigators asked Canadian authorities to locate Ressam for questioning, but the Canadians were unable to locate him, as he was living under the name Benni Noris. In the summer of 1999, informed by Abu Doha that the other members of his cell had been unable to reach Canada due to immigration issues, he chose to continue without them.

In August 1999, he decided to bomb Los Angeles International Airport, the third-busiest airport in the world at the time. He was familiar with it and also thought it would be a politically and economically sensitive target. He planned to conduct a rehearsal using a luggage cart, putting it in a place that was not suspicious, and observing how long it would take for airport security to notice it. He planned to execute his plan in a passenger waiting area, using one or two suitcases filled with explosives.

In September 1999, Ressam purchased electronic equipment and components in order to build detonators, and made four timing devices. He recruited Abdelmajid Dahoumane, an old friend of his, to help him. In November, with Dahoumane's assistance, he bought urea and aluminum sulfate from nurseries, and mixed it together with nitric and sulphuric acid he stole from fertilizer manufacturers to create a TNT-like explosive substance.

He had met Mokhtar Haouari in early 1994, when he first arrived in Canada. Haouari was involved in fraudulent activity that included the theft and sale of stolen passports and creation of fraudulent credit cards, and Ressam sold him some stolen identity cards. In early November he recruited Haouari to assist him in what he described as "some very important and dangerous business in the U.S.", by providing continued funding for his project, a credit card, and a fake ID. In addition, Haouari in turn recruited Brooklyn, New York-based Algerian illegal immigrant Abdelghani Meskini, a con man who he said was involved in bank fraud, to assist Ressam.

On November 17, 1999, Ressam and Dahoumane traveled from Montreal, Quebec, to Vancouver, British Columbia. They rented a small motel cottage at the 2400 Court Motel on Kingsway, where they prepared the explosives for LAX. They left behind an acid burn stain on a table and corroded plumbing. In December Ressam called Abu Jaffar in Afghanistan to ask whether Osama bin Laden wanted to take credit for the attack, but did not get an answer. He also called Abu Doha in London, told him that he wanted to return to Algeria after the attack, and was assured he would receive money and documents.

Ressam arranged for the English-speaking Meskini to wait for him in Seattle. Meskini would assist him by helping him rent a car and communicate in English, driving him, and giving him a cell phone and money withdrawn with a stolen bank debit card.

== Capture ==
Ressam rented a dark green 1999 Chrysler 300M luxury sedan, and on the evening of December 13, Ressam and Dahoumane hid the explosives and all the related components in the wheel well in the car's trunk. On December 14, they left Vancouver, traveling to Victoria, British Columbia. Believing that he would draw less scrutiny alone, Ressam sent Dahoumane back to Vancouver by bus.

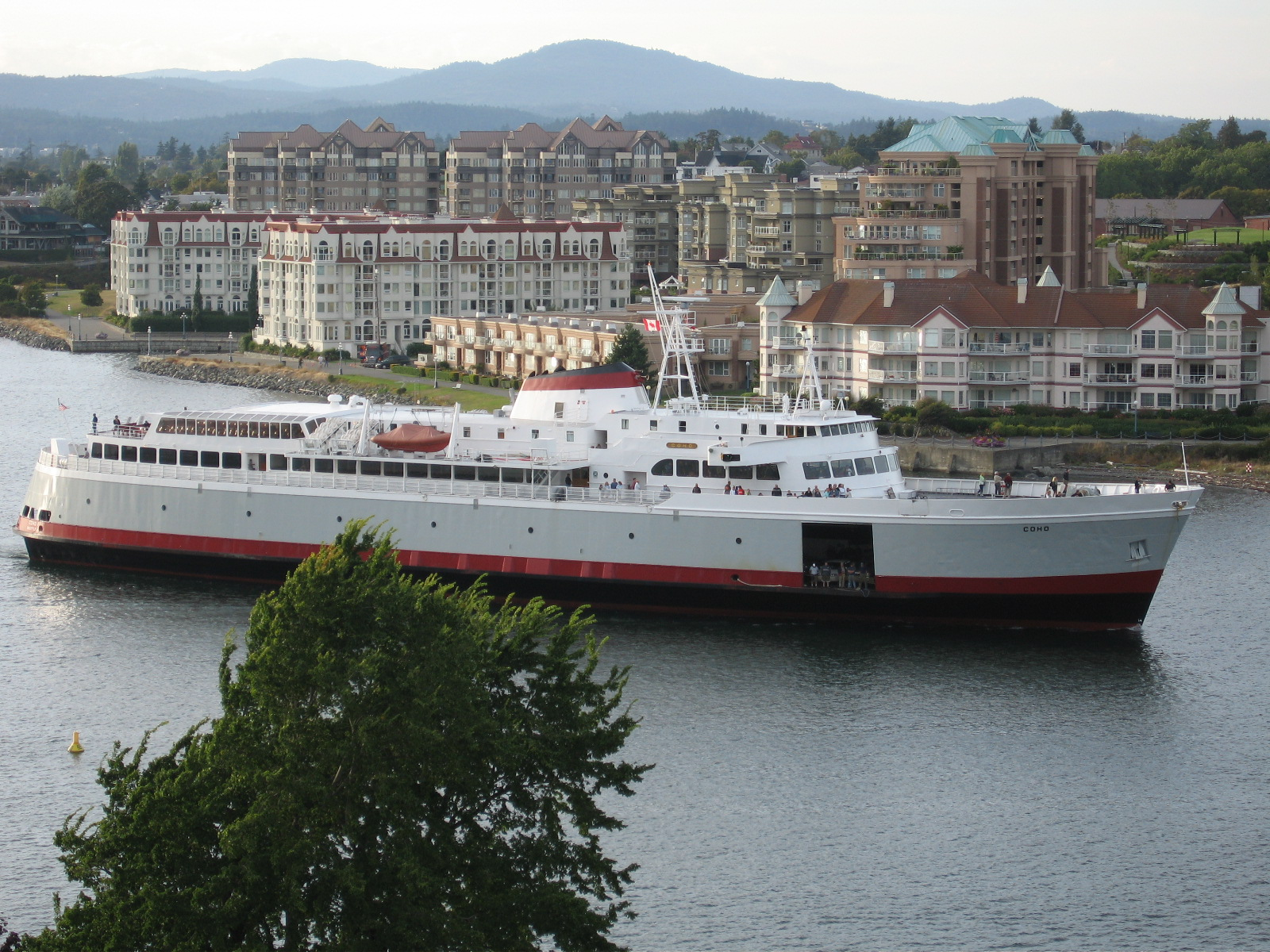
MV Coho ferry entering Victoria, British Columbia, Canada

Ressam took the MV Coho car ferry from Victoria to Port Angeles, Washington. He successfully passed through U.S. Immigration and Naturalization Service checks in Victoria, and boarded the last ferry of the day for the 90-minute crossing to the U.S.

After the ferry docked in Port Angeles at 6 pm, Ressam intended to be the last car to leave the ferry. Although there had not been any intelligence reports suggesting threats, U.S. Customs inspector Diana Dean decided to have a secondary Customs search conducted of Ressam's car, saying later that Ressam was acting "hinky" and asked him to get out of the car.

At first, Ressam was not cooperative. Dean requested that he fill out a Customs declaration form, which he did, identifying as a Canadian citizen named Benni Noris. He had a passport, Quebec driver license, and credit cards all in the Noris name, as well as another Quebec driver license with the same date of birth, but in the name "Mario Roig". Royal Canadian Mounted Police later advised that the Mario Roig driver license was a fake, and did not exist in their records.

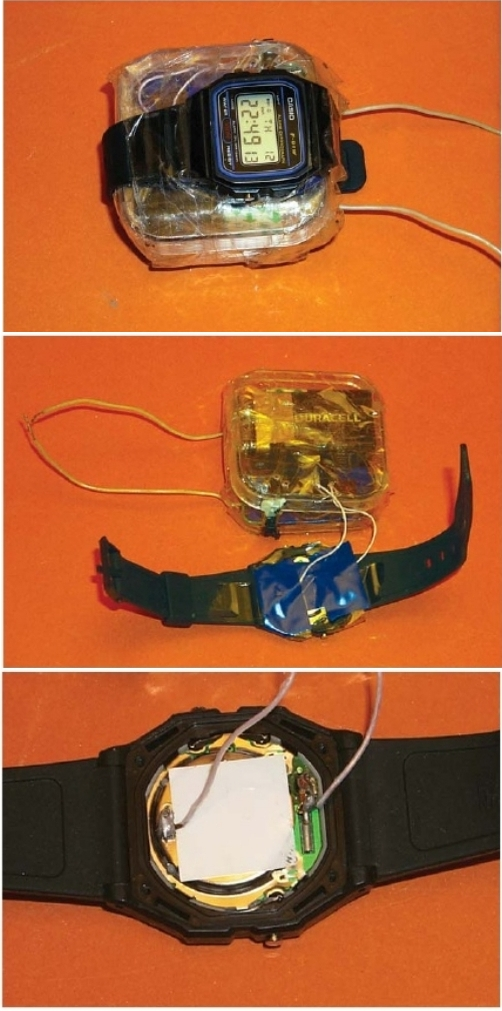
This timer, built around a Casio f91w, the model bought by Ahmed Ressam, was captured in Afghanistan in the early 2000s.

Another Customs inspector searched the car and found in the spare tire well:

- ten green plastic garbage bags with 118 pounds (54 kg) of a fine white powder (which tests later identified as urea, used to manufacture explosives and fertilizer),
- two lozenge bottles filled with primary explosives hexamethylene triperoxide diamine (HMTD) and cyclotrimethylenetrinitramine (RDX),
- two plastic bags with 14 pounds (6.4 kg) of a crystalline powder (later shown to be aluminium sulfate, used primarily as a desiccant, to keep things dry),
- two 22-ounce olive jars with 2.6 pounds (1.2 kg) of golden-brown liquid (later identified as secondary explosive ethylene glycol dinitrate (EGDN), an extremely explosive and volatile nitroglycerin equivalent that is twice as powerful as TNT), and
- four operational timing devices designed to detonate primary explosives, consisting of small black boxes containing circuit boards connected to Casio watches and 9-volt battery connectors.

As one of the Customs inspectors escorted Ressam from the car, he broke free and fled. Inspectors chased him for five to six blocks and caught him as he tried to force his way into a car stopped at a traffic light. They took him into custody.

He was arrested by the U.S. Border Patrol on charges of misrepresentation on entry and failure to be inspected, booked into the Clallam County Jail in Clallam County, Washington, and investigated by the U.S. Federal Bureau of Investigation (FBI). Customs officials searching him and the car also found the phone numbers of Abu Doha and Meskini. His fingerprints were analyzed by the Royal Canadian Mounted Police, who determined that he was "Ahmed Ressam", rather than "Benni Antoine Noris".

An explosives expert concluded that the materials in his car could have produced a blast 40 times greater than that of a devastating car bomb. It was ultimately determined that he had intended to detonate the explosives at the Los Angeles International Airport.

== Trial, sentencing, and appeals ==
=== Indictment and trial ===
Ressam was indicted by a superseding indictment on January 20, 2000, for nine counts of criminal activity in connection with his attempt to bomb the Los Angeles International Airport on December 31, 1999:

1. an act of terrorism transcending a national boundary;
2. placing an explosive in proximity to a terminal;
3. false identification documents;
4. use of a fictitious name for admission to the U.S.;
5. the felony of making a false statement to a U.S. Customs official;
6. smuggling;
7. transportation of explosives;
8. possession of an unregistered firearm; and
9. carrying an explosive during the commission of a felony.

Following a 19-day trial in U.S. District Court in Los Angeles, with approximately 120 witnesses, a jury found Ressam guilty on all counts of his indictment on April 6, 2001. That same day, he was convicted in absentia in France, and sentenced to five years for conspiring to commit terrorist acts there.

=== Cooperation and sentencing ===
Ressam's sentencing was delayed for four years, to give counter-terrorism analysts a chance to fully exploit him as an intelligence source. Facing up to 130 years in prison, Ressam began cooperating with investigators after his conviction. He entered into a June 23, 2001, cooperation agreement with the U.S. government. Under the agreement, after he cooperated fully with the U.S. and other governments, the U.S. government would recommend a prison sentence taking his cooperation into consideration, though the recommendation would not under any circumstances be less than 27 years.

Ressam provided information to law enforcement officials of the U.S. and six other countries with regard to al-Qaeda's organization, recruitment, and training activities. He revealed that al-Qaeda sleeper cells existed within the U.S. This information was included in the President's Daily Brief delivered to President George W. Bush on August 6, 2001, entitled "Bin Ladin [sic] Determined To Strike in US". He testified in July 2001 against his accomplice and co-conspirator, Haouari. In addition, Ressam said that Ahcene Zemiri, a fellow Algerian who was being held at Guantanamo Bay detention camp, was involved in the plot. Zemiri's Combatant Status Review Tribunal used this information to continue to hold Zemiri as unlawful combatant, without charges.

Ressam's accusations were used as the basis of 7 of the 12 unclassified allegations in the Summary of Evidence memo prepared for Abu Zubeida's Combatant Status Review Tribunal. The Globe and Mail opined that the intelligence analysts' reliance on Ressam's confessions was due to wanting unclassified allegations against Abu Zubeida to be based on evidence that was not gained through torture. Abu Zubaydah had been tortured while held by the CIA before being transferred to military custody and Guantanamo in September 2006. None of the evidence gained through coercive interrogation could be admitted to court.

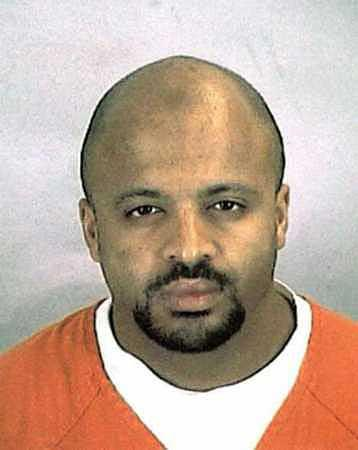
Zacarias Moussaoui

Ressam had trained with Zacarias Moussaoui at Khalden Camp and was able to identify him when asked. Moussaoui was an al-Qaeda member later implicated in the 9/11 plot. Moussaoui had been arrested by the FBI on August 16, 2001. However, FBI agents were not successful in convincing their superiors of enough evidence against him to obtain a warrant to allow them to search Moussaoui's laptop and belongings. The 9/11 Commission Report opined that had Ressam been asked about Moussaoui, he would have broken that logjam.

By November 28, 2001, Ressam began to express reluctance about discussing some matters. By early 2003, after having provided 65 hours of trial and deposition testimony and the names of 150 people involved in terrorism, he stopped cooperating. He began to recant his prior testimony.

The Seattle Times described Ressam's sentencing hearing as the "gripping climax" to his journey through the U.S. court system. U.S. Attorney John McKay argued Ressam should get a 35-year sentence, because he had declined to cooperate in two cases, which would go unprosecuted. Ressam's lawyer argued that Ressam should be given a sentence of less than 20 years, to reflect the value of his original cooperation, saying: "It is a flat fact that law enforcement, the public, and public safety benefited in immeasurable ways from Ressam's decision to go to trial and [later] cooperate." Ressam did not say anything during his sentencing hearing, but sent the judge a personal note, in which he apologized for planning to bomb the airport.

On July 27, 2005, United States District Court Judge John Coughenour sentenced Ressam to 22 years in prison, plus 5 years of supervision after his release; credited for good conduct, he could have been released after 14 years. According to the Seattle Times, the judge

used the occasion [of Ressam's sentencing] to unleash a broadside against secret tribunals and other war on terrorism tactics that abandon "the ideals that set our nation apart". "The tragedy of Sept. 11 shook our sense of security and made us realize that we, too, are vulnerable to acts of terrorism", said Coughenour in a voice edged with emotion. "Unfortunately, some believe that this threat renders our Constitution obsolete. ... If that view is allowed to prevail, the terrorists will have won."

In November 2006, Ressam wrote to Judge Coughenour, recanting his accusations against Zemiri and saying he had not participated at all in the bombing plot. Zemiri's attorneys advised the military lawyers at Guantanamo and incorporated this information in his habeas corpus case. Zemiri was released without charge finally in January 2010 and repatriated to Algeria, his country of citizenship.

=== Appeals and resentencings ===
In January 2007, a divided panel of the United States Court of Appeals for the Ninth Circuit in Seattle reversed Ressam's conviction on the count of carrying an explosive "during the commission of" the felony of making a false statement to a US customs official. The Ninth Circuit read the word "during" to require that the explosive be carried "in relation to" the underlying felony, and found that this requirement was not met. The Supreme Court of the United States reversed the Ninth Circuit in an 8–1 decision in May 2008. It held that "during" only meant a "temporal link", and restored the original conviction. The case went back to the district court for resentencing, where Judge Coughenour again sentenced Ressam to 22 years in prison.

On February 2, 2010, the Ninth Circuit Court of Appeals ruled that Ressam's 22-year sentence was too lenient, and did not fit in the then-mandatory sentencing guidelines, which indicated he should have received at least 65 years, and up to 130 years, in prison. Finding that the trial court judge's "views appear too entrenched to allow for the appearance of fairness on remand", the appellate court ordered that Ressam be re-sentenced by a different district court judge from the one who had handed down the original sentence. An 11-judge en banc panel of the Ninth Circuit reheard the case. The en banc panel agreed that the 22-year sentence was unreasonable, but sent the case back to Judge Coughenour for resentencing.

In October 2012, Coughenour resentenced Ressam to 37 years' imprisonment. Ressam served his sentence at ADX Florence, the federal supermax prison, following his first sentencing. In September 2023, Ressam was transferred to USP Florence High.
