= Islamist plots to attack the Vatican =

Alleged terrorist plans to attack Vatican City

Islamist plots to attack the Vatican refers to two alleged terrorist plans to attack the Vatican, neither of which were carried out.

== Alleged 2010 plan ==
The 2010 plan was allegedly to attack the Vatican with a bomb. It was uncovered after the arrest of 9 individuals on 24 April 2015 by Italian DIGOS detectives on charges of plotting to bomb the Vatican. There was evidence that the 9 October 2009 Peshawar bombing in Pakistan was substantially planned and financed from Olbia, Sardinia, and that some Italy-based militants took part in it.

== Alleged ISIS plan ==
The 2016 attack plot was allegedly planned by a Moroccan national, Abderrahim Moutahrrick, on orders from ISIS to attack the Vatican and the Israeli Embassy in Rome during the Extraordinary Jubilee of Mercy year announced by Pope Francis to extend from December 2015 to November 2016. The instruction arrived via WhatsApp sent from within ISIS-held territory; it read: "Dear brother Abderrahim, I send you... the bomb poem... listen to the sheik and strike," referencing ISIS leader Abu Bakr al-Baghdadi.

== See also ==
- Strasbourg Cathedral bombing plot
