= Mohammed Bensakhria =

Alleged Islamic terrorist

Mohamed Bensakhria
- Arrested: 2001; Alicante, Spain; Spanish police
- Citizenship: Algerian
- Penalty: 10 years
- Status: released

Mohamed Bensakhria is an Algerian citizen, sentenced in France to 10 years in prison for his role in the 2000 Strasbourg Cathedral bombing plot on December 16, 2004. He is suspected of having had close links to Osama bin Laden.

He was arrested in Alicante on June 22, 2001. According to Spanish authorities, he was the leader of the Meliani group. Bensakhria's group was, according to Spanish authorities, funded by bin Laden. He had lived in Alicante for a period, after escaping from German police. The German police had uncovered a terror plot in December, and dismantled the group Bensakhria is believed to have led.
