= Abu Doha =

Algerian alleged member of al-Qaeda

- أبو ضحى
- Born: Hider Hanani; 1963 (age 62–63)
- Other name: Amar Makhlulif
- Organization: Al-Qaeda
- Allegiance: GSPC
- Conviction: Immigration offences

Hider Hanani (b. 1963), alias Amar Makhlulif and kunya Abu Doha (Arabic: أبو ضحى), is an Algerian alleged to be member of the al-Qaeda and GSPC terrorist networks.

Hanani claimed asylum when he first arrived in Britain in 1994. He left the country for Afghanistan from 1996 to 1999, where he admittedly attended the Khalden training camp.

As a result of a German terrorism investigation, Hanani was arrested at London Heathrow Airport in February 2001 while attempting to travel to Jeddah, Saudi Arabia on a forged passport. Hanani was held on terrorism charges while his traveling companion Rabah Kadre was suspected of an immigration violation.

Hanani was indicted in the United States in August 2001 for being the mastermind of the plot to bomb the Los Angeles airport during the 2000 millennium celebrations. When Ahmed Ressam was apprehended, he had a business card with Hanani’s number and calling cards which were used to call it 11 days earlier. Ressam's testimony provided evidence for the indictment, but after he stopped cooperating with prosecutors, they dropped the case in 2005. Hanani has admitted meeting Ahmed Ressam in Jalalabad, but not being involved in the millennium bombing plot.

After the U.S. extradition request was dropped, Hanani was held in prison under immigration powers by the British government. Hanani was held in Belmarsh Prison. In July 2008, the Special Immigration Appeals Commission released him on bail, under 24-hour house arrest. Although the British press was forced to identified him only as "U", details in the ruling identifies him clearly as Hanani. In February 2009, Hanani was returned to Belmarsh Prison on the orders of the Home Secretary Jacqui Smith. After writing a statement that said he and his world views had changed, Hanani was released to house arrest again in a ruling in July 2011.

== Other allegations ==
A call from Frankfurt, Germany on 24 December 2000 to Hanani was intercepted by MI5. The caller asked for more money and referred to an upcoming mission. The intercept was passed to German police and resulted in the arrest of the Strasbourg cathedral bombing plotters. At their trial, the German judge said Hanani encouraged the perpetrators to carry out the attack. He was also linked to the plot in a trial in France.

Italy investigated Hanani in connection with a plot to bomb the American embassy in Rome by a group in Milan, Italy.

All three countries deferred to the United States' extradition request, but when that was dropped, they could not pursue Hanani because the trials in these incidents were over.
