= Antisemitism in 21st-century France =

Antisemitism in France has become heightened since the late 20th century and into the 21st century.

At the beginning of the 21st century, antisemitism in France rose sharply during the unrest of the Second Intifada in Israel and the Palestinian territories, as it did in other European nations. In addition, a significant proportion of the second-generation Muslim immigrant population in France began to identify with the Palestinian cause, with some also identifying with radical Islamism. In the early 2000s, a critical debate on the nature of antisemitism in France accompanied denunciation of it in relation to the situation in the Middle East and to Islam. Divisions developed among anti-racist groups. Since 2023, France has experienced a sharp increase in reported antisemitic incidents compared to previous years.

Alarmed by violence and verbal attacks, some French Jews began to emigrate to Israel. By early 2014, the number of French Jews making aliyah (emigrating to Israel) surpassed that of American Jews emigrating. At the same time, 70% of French Jews reported in surveys that they were concerned about insults or harassment, and 60% about physical aggression because of their ethnicity; both figures are much higher than shown in surveys of the European average. In accordance with this, a survey conducted in 2024 found that one in five young French people thinks it would be a good thing that Jews leave the country.

== Background ==
At the turn of the 21st century, France had an estimated 500,000 to 600,000 Jews, most of them Sephardi Jews and of Maghrebi Jews. This is the second-largest population outside of Israel, and after that in the United States. In the early 21st century, most French Jews, like most Muslims in France, are of North African origin. In 2016, Paris had the largest population of Jews in France, followed by Marseille, which has 70,000.

Historically, numerous North African Arabs had lived and worked in France since before World War II. The Muslim community built the Grand Mosque of Paris in 1929. Its imam and rector, Si Kaddour Benghabrit, and numerous members helped protect Jews from deportation during the Holocaust. A quarter of the historic Ashkenazi Jewish population in France was murdered in the Holocaust of World War II. After the war, the French government passed laws to suppress antisemitic discrimination and actions and to protect Jews in the country.

Sociologists such as Nonna Mayer, Laurent Mucchielli, and others have said that antisemitic opinions have been in decline in France since the end of the Second World War, and that other forms of racism have been more widespread than antisemitism. Members of the French Jewish community criticized this conclusion.

In the 1950s and 1960s, many Sephardic Jews emigrated to France from countries such as Algeria, Morocco, and Tunisia, which had gained independence from colonial rule through extended warfare against France. The wars for independence left both sides with considerable bitterness, and Algeria was immersed in civil war for years after gaining independence. Jews left North Africa as relations in the area became more strained during the Six-Day War of 1967 between Israel, Egypt and other Arab forces. This increased tensions across the Arab world. Expressions of antisemitism were seen to rise during the Six-Day War and the French anti-Zionist campaign of the 1970s and 1980s.

Following the electoral successes achieved by the extreme right-wing National Front and an increasing denial of the Holocaust among some persons in the 1990s, surveys showed an increase in stereotypical antisemitic beliefs among the general French population. In the mid-1990s, historians renewed a critical study of National Socialism, French collaboration with the Nazi regime, and the responsibility of the government of Vichy France for the deportation of Jews during the Holocaust. They contested the 1972 book Vichy France: Old Guard and New Order, 1940–1944 (published in French as La France de Vichy) by American historian Robert Paxton, who had argued that the Vichy Regime cooperated with Nazi Germany during its occupation.

The Second Intifada, beginning in 2000, contributed to rising tensions with Arab Muslims and Jews feeling less welcome in North African nations. Most have now left the region. Beginning in the late 20th century, more Arabs from North African nations began to emigrate to France for economic reasons and to escape civil wars in their home nations. France has struggled to help young working-class Arab adults find jobs, and their unemployment rate remains high. In their isolated public housing communities outside Paris, antisemitic sentiment is widespread. Many working-class Arabs and Sephardic Jews also settled in cities in southern France, which had long been linked by trade and culture to North Africa. In many of these communities, such as Nice and Marseille, Arab and Jewish immigrants from North African nations have lived in mixed communities as they began to make new lives in France. Both Jews and Muslims are minorities in France. Many North African Jews worked with Arab immigrants to combat racism in France against the latter group, and support other progressive causes.

French concerns about antisemitism among second-generation Arab groups are also related to general concerns about Islamic terrorism in the country. The November 2015 Paris attacks, orchestrated by the Islamic State, left 140 dead—including the perpetrators—and at least 400 individuals injured. Those attacks were generally targeted at all French people. In addition, from the end of 2015 into early 2016, there were independent attacks against individual Jews in several cities, including three in Marseille from October to January.

Historian Maud Mandel grounds her book Jews and Muslims in France: A History of a Conflict (2014) on historic relations among the peoples of North Africa. She attributes the roots of Muslim antisemitism among second-generation immigrants in France to earlier inter-communal relations among the peoples in Algeria, Tunisia, and Morocco; the course of decolonization in North Africa; and events in the continuing Arab–Israeli conflict.

== Antisemitic acts ==
The National Consultative Commission on Human Rights (Commission nationale consultative des droits de l'homme, CNCDH) has issued annual reports on antisemitic activities as part of the French oversight of human rights. It recorded disturbing levels of antisemitic actions and threats in France between 2002 and 2004 (the height of the Second Intifada), and in 2009. According to CNCDH, it defined actions to be tracked as homicides, attacks and attempted attacks, arson, degradations, and violence and assault and battery. Antisemitic threats are defined as covering speech acts, threatening gestures and insults, graffiti (inscriptions), pamphlets and emails. Its data was relied on in the FRA (European Union Agency for Fundamental Rights) report of antisemitism incidents in France from 2001 to 2011, which was issued in June 2012. An additional report was filled in 2023 for the years 2012 to 2022. In 2024, a report was written by the Conseil Représentatif des Institutions juives de France (CRIF) detailing the number and types of antisemitic incidents that occurred in 2023 and it showed a fourfold increase in antisemitic incidents. A report released by CRIF in January 2025 reveals that 1,570 antisemitic incidents were reported in France over the course of 2024.

Antisemitic actions and threats recorded in France
Year	Number of incidents	Year	Number of incidents	Year	Number of incidents
2001	219	2012	614	2023	1676
2002	936	2013	423	2024	1570
2003	601	2014	851		
2004	974	2015	808		
2005	508	2016	335		
2006	571	2017	311		
2007	402	2018	541		
2008	459	2019	687		
2009	815	2020	339		
2010	466	2021	589		
2011	389	2022	436		

The Criminal Affairs and Pardon Board at the Ministry of Justice (Direction des affaires criminelles et des graces, DACG) keeps records related to the number of indictments charged in the calendar year in relation to racist, antisemitic and discriminatory offenses.

	Indictments relating to offences relating to racism	Indictments relating principally to racist offences	Indictments relating exclusively to racist offences
2001	211	152	115
2002	228	158	115
2003	208	145	105
2004	345	236	165
2005	573	380	253
2006	611	364	275
2007	577	423	306
2008	682	469	344
2009	579	397	288
2010	567	397	298

=== Attacks ===
==== 2002 - 2014 ====
The 2002 Lyon car attack was part of a wave of increased attacks on Jews and Jewish targets in France in the early 21st century. Analysts related it to the Second Intifada in Israel and the Palestinian territories.

On January 21, 2006, Ilan Halimi, a young French Jewish man of Moroccan descent was kidnapped by a group called the Gang of Barbarians, led by Youssouf Fofana. Halimi was subsequently tortured over a period of three weeks, resulting in his death.

From March 11 to 19, 2012, Mohammed Merah, a French man of Algerian descent born in Toulouse, committed the Toulouse and Montauban shootings, a series of three attacks against French soldiers and civilians in Toulouse and Montauban, in the Midi-Pyrénees region. The last day he attacked a Jewish day school in Toulouse, killing a teacher, Yonatan Sandler and three children (aged 8, 5 & 3), and wounding a teenager. He killed a total of three French Muslim soldiers in Toulouse and Montauban, and seriously wounded a fourth. During the 30-hour police siege at his apartment on March 22, Merah wounded three police men before he was killed by a police sniper.

In 2014, there was a brutal attack that took place in the town of Creteil south-east of Paris. The two victims, a woman aged 19 and her boyfriend, 21, were tied up in his family's flat and the woman was raped. Their lawyer said three men of north African origin, Abdou Salam Koita, Ladje Haidara and Houssame Hatri, had burst into the flat, telling the boyfriend: "You Jews, you have money."

==== 2015 ====
Attacks on Jews had a record high in 2015, the numbers fell 58% in 2016 and fell a further 7% in 2017. In 2018, the first nine months of the year saw a 69% rise in attacks. Despite only representing 1% of the population in France, Jews were the target of 40% of racially or religiously motivated violent acts in 2017. Increases in violent attacks on Jews in France since 2015 are thought to put "the very existence of Jewish communities" in France in doubt.

During the January 2015 Île-de-France attacks, the Porte de Vincennes siege involved a gunman taking hostages at a Kosher supermarket. In the aftermath of the attacks, the French government increased the presence of soldiers outside prominent Jewish buildings.

In the February 2015 Nice stabbing attack soldiers guarding a Jewish community center in Nice were attacked by an Islamist supporter of ISIL wielding a knife.

On 24 October 2015, three Jewish men outside a synagogue in Marseille were stabbed by a man shouting anti-Jewish slogans. One of the victims sustained serious abdominal wounds; he was expected to survive. The assailant was apprehended.

On 18 November 2015 a teacher in Marseille walking on the street was stabbed by three men who shouted anti-Jewish slogans; one of the men wore an ISIS T-shirt. The three men, riding two scooters, had approached the teacher and stabbed him in the arm and in the leg. They fled when a car approached.

==== 2016 ====
On January 12, 2016, Benjamin Amsellem, a teacher, was attacked by a teenage boy wielding a machete outside a Jewish school in Marseille. The attacker claimed to be acting in the name of ISIS. Amsellem resisted by parrying some of the machete blows with the large, leather-bound Bible he was carrying. The attacker was a Kurdish Muslim whose family emigrated to France from Turkey. An excellent student from a stable, pious home, he is said by French authorities to have self-radicalized by spending long hours reading Islamist websites.

On August 18, 2016, a "confirmed anti-semite" shouted "allahu akbar" (Takbir), as he attacked a 62-year-old Jew wearing a kippah on avenue des Vosges in Strasbourg. The attacker had previously stabbed another Jew in 2010 in Kléber square. The French Minister of the Interior, Bernard Cazeneuve, called the rabbi of Strasbourg to express his "solidarity". The attacker was said to have mental problems. The attacker was charged the following day with "attempted murder based on the victim's appearance belonging to a race or religion."

==== 2017 ====
On April 4, 2017, retired kindergarten professor, Dr. Sarah Halimi, an Orthodox Jew, was murdered and subsequently thrown off her Paris balcony by Mali-born Kobili Traoré, who shouted "allahu akbar" as he beat her to death. The murder sparked a public conversation in France about the failure of the press to report on and the failure of the government to act on violent antisemitism in France.

In 2017, it was reported that "A former principal at a preparatory school for teenagers...said he regularly advised Jews not to attend his institution for fear of harassment by other students" and that only a third of Jews attend public schools.

==== 2018 ====
In March 2018, an elderly woman, Mireille Knoll, was brutally murdered in her apartment in a subsidized housing project in Paris in a killing that was immediately declared and officially recognized as an act of Jew hatred.

==== 2019 ====
In late 2018 and early 2019, a number of attacks occurred, such as the defacing of portraits of the late Holocaust survivor and French minister Simone Veil, scrawling the German word for "Jews" on a Parisian bakery and cutting down a tree planted in memory of a Jewish youth tortured and murdered by an antisemitic gang. In February 2019, nearly 100 graves were desecrated with Nazi symbols the Quatzenheim Jewish cemetery in the Alsace region of eastern France. President Emmanuel Macron visited the site to show solidarity with the whole of France, vowing that the perpetrators would be punished using current laws.

On 16 February 2019, a group of individuals involved in a yellow-vests march confronted 69-year-old Jewish philosopher and academic Alain Finkielkraut with verbal antisemitic abuse. Police stepped in to protect him, and Macron later said that this behaviour was an "absolute negation" of what made France great and would not be tolerated.

Statistics published in February 2019 showed a rise of 74% in the number of antisemitic attacks in the previous year, from 311 (2017) to 541 (2018).

Concerns have been raised in France about whether the gilets jaunes movement is providing a new kind of forum for extremist views, since Alain Finkielkraut was verbally abused on 16 February 2019. Vincent Duclert, a specialist in French antisemitism, said that "the gilets jaunes are not an anti-Semitic movement, but alongside the demonstration each Saturday there's a lot of anti-Semitic expression by groups of the extreme right or extreme left." Jean-Yves Camus, expert in French political extremism, talked of "a new space for different kinds of anti-Semitism to come together: from the extreme right and extreme left, but also from radical Islamist or anti-Zionist groups, and some types of social conservatives". Politicians expressed different views of how or why antisemitic influences may be infiltrating the movement and the rise of antisemitism in France in the past couple of years.

==== 2023 ====
On October 23, 2023, the door to a Jewish couple's apartment was set on fire. The door was the only one in the building with a mezuzah and police were investigating if the attack was because of religion.

In November 2023, a Jewish woman in her thirties was stabbed in her doorstep in Lyon while a swastika was found graffitied at her home. The prosecutor's office said there could be "an anti-Semitic motive" to the attack.

According to a report from the Conseil Représentatif des Institutions juives de France (CRIF), the number of antisemitic crimes in France in 2023 nearly quadrupled compared to 2022, with 1,676 reported incidents.

==== 2024 ====
On 12 February 2024, a 35-year-old Jewish man was stabbed 6 times in Paris, the attacker was using anti-semitic remarks while attacking and a public prosecutor's office opened an investigation into the offense of attempted murder on grounds of religion. The victim and the attacker are reported to be childhood friends who recently got back in touch.

On 17 May 2024, a synagogue in Rouen was set on fire by an Algerian man, who threw a petrol bomb through a small window. The arsonist, equipped with a knife, climbed onto the synagogue's roof and threatened police officers before being shot. The fire inside the synagogue was eventually brought under control by firefighters, with no reported victims other than the assailant. Damage inside the synagogue was significant, although the Torah scrolls remained unharmed.

In June 2024, French police launched an investigation into the gang rape of a 12-year-old Jewish girl in Courbevoie, in what is being treated as an antisemitic crime. The suspects, three teenagers aged 12–14, are set to appear in court. One suspect, an ex-boyfriend of the victim, allegedly sought vengeance after learning of her Jewish identity, with investigators finding antisemitic content on his phone, including images of a burned Israeli flag. Another suspect admitted to hitting the victim due to her negative comments about Palestine. The girl was reportedly called a "dirty Jew" and received death threats.

==== 2025 ====
On 5–6 January 2025, at least 10 Jewish homes, businesses, and a synagogue in Paris and Rouen have been vandalized with antisemitic symbols, including swastikas. Some of the graffiti praised Hitler, while others said antisemitic slogans, such as "Jews pedophiles, rapists to be gassed".

On 22 March 2025, the Chief Rabbi of Orleans, Rabbi Arié Engelberg, was attacked while walking with his young son in the city center. The assailant hurled antisemitic insults at him before physically assaulting him. French President Emmanuel Macron condemned the attack and denounced the “poison of antisemitism,” expressing his support with the country's Jewish community.

In September 2025, an undergraduate student at Paris 1 Panthéon-Sorbonne University removed several students after being labelled as "Zionists". Two months later, the student was sentenced to a four-month suspended prison term for "school harassment aggravated by discriminatory intent relating to the victim's presumed membership of the Jewish religion". The court interpreted the label "Zionists" as a proxy for Jewish identity in context and ordered the student to complete an educational placement at the Shoah Memorial and pay damages.

In 2025, former Hamas hostage Mia Schem reported that a yellow ribbon she wore in support of the remaining hostages to the Cannes Film festival had been confiscated by the event's organizers upon her arrival at the red carpet.

In 2025, France continued to record historically elevated levels of antisemitic incidents. According to data published by the French Ministry of the Interior, authorities documented 1,320 antisemitic acts for the year, accounting for over half of all anti-religious incidents despite representing a small fraction of the national population. This figure marked a 16 % decline from the previous year, but remained one of the highest on record, with antisemitic acts disproportionately targeting individuals through verbal abuse, physical assault and other offences.

==== 2026 ====
In January 2026, three high-school textbooks referred to the October 7 victims as "Jewish settlers". France's president, Emmanuel Macron, criticized the books as intolerable and a falsification.

On February 11, a 13-year-old Jewish boy walking to a synagogue in Paris's 18th arrondissement was assaulted by a group of five who tripped and punched him, threatened him with a knife, stole his belongings and made antisemitic remarks during the attack, according to French authorities. The Paris prosecutor's office said one suspect was identified and arrested after the victim was on a video call during the assault, and the offence is being investigated on suspicion of armed robbery and aggravated violence motivated by discrimination. Later in the month, a pig's head and antisemitic graffiti referencing Jews and Israel were found outside the gate of the home of the mayor of Nice, Christian Estrosi.

In March 2026, a 14-year-old Jewish girl was attacked in Sarcelles, a Paris suburb by three adolescents. They asked her why she wasn't observing Ramadan and upon learning she's Jewish, they allegedly insulted her with antisemitic slurs, threatened to kill her, and hit her in the face. Two of the suspects were arrested later the same day.

On 8 August 2026, two 19-year-old men were filmed performing Nazi salutes near the Moroccan synagogue on rue Raymond-Rochon in Sarcelles. The men were arrested and convicted of glorifying terrorism. One of them, a Russian national, was sentenced to eight months in prison and permanently banned from entering France, whereas the other, a French citizen, received a six-month prison sentence.

In October, during the student protests, a synagogue in Paris was attacked, causing extensive damage inside.

=== Public opinion surveys ===
According to the collection of two Anti-Defamation League (ADL) opinion surveys conducted in five European nations (which included France, The United Kingdom, Germany, Denmark, and Belgium) in June 2002, and five additional European nations in October 2002, 42% of respondents in France believed that Jews were more loyal to Israel than their own country, 42% said Jews have too much power in the business world, and 46% believed Jews talked too much about the Holocaust. Abraham H. Foxman, ADL National Director, said, "These findings are especially disturbing because they show that the old, classical form of antisemitism, which we had hoped was long gone in Europe, continues to be resilient".

In 2004, ADL conducted the same opinion survey in ten European nations, including Germany, the UK, Italy, Spain and France. The report said that 25% of the residents of the ten nations held antisemitic attitudes, down from 35% in five nations in 2002. 28% responded "probably true" to the statement, "Jews are more loyal to Israel than their own country", down from 42% in 2002. 15% responded "probably true" to the statement, "Jews don't care about anyone but their own kind", down from 20%.

In May 2005, the ADL published an opinion survey conducted in 12 European countries regarding popular attitudes toward Jews. The 2005 survey indicated that since 2004 and the survey of 10 nations, there was some decline in the acceptance of certain traditional antisemitic stereotypes. 25% responded "probably true" to the statement, "Jews have too much power in the business world", down from 33% in 2004, while 24% responded "probably true" to the statement "Jews have too much power in international financial markets", down from 29% in 2004.

Two years later, in May 2007, the ADL published another opinion survey conducted in five European nations. It found that 22% of respondents answered "probably true" to at least three of the four antisemitic stereotypes tested: Jews are more loyal to Israel than to this country, Jews have too much power in the business world, Jews have too much power in international financial markets, Jews still talk too much about what happened to them in the Holocaust. According to the survey, respondents believed that violence directed against French Jews was based more on anti-Jewish feelings than anti-Israel sentiment.

The Friedrich Ebert Stiftung (FES) organization published a report in 2011, Intolerance, Prejudice and Discrimination: A European Report. It concluded that antisemitic attitudes in France that same year, as a whole, were less widespread than the European average. According to a survey conducted by FES, 27.7% agreed with the statement "Jews have too much influence in France" and 25.8% agreed with the statement "Jews in general do not care about anything or anyone but their own kind" (implying disloyalty to the nation).

In 2012, the ADL conducted another opinion survey of antisemitic attitudes in 10 European countries. It reported that the overall level of antisemitism in France had increased to 24% of the population, up from to 20% in 2009. In terms of specific statements, 45% responded "probably true" related to "Jews are more loyal to Israel" than their own country, up from 38% in 2009. 35% responded "probably true" to the statement, "Jews have too much power in the business world", up from 33% in 2009. 29% responded "probably true" to the statement "Jews have too much power in international financial markets", up from 27% in 2009. Foxman, ADL National Director, has said regarding those findings:

In France, you have a volatile mix. France has seen an increase in the level of anti-Semitism. At the same time, more people today believe that violence directed against European Jews is fueled by anti-Jewish attitudes as opposed to anti-Israel sentiment. Those increases are all the more disturbing in light of the [2012] shooting attack at the Jewish school in Toulouse.

== Responses to antisemitism ==
The French Jewish establishment has traditionally worked with the government and various community groups on legal routes and education to combat and reduce antisemitism. CRIF, an umbrella body of French Jewish communities, has used outreach and education to lessen tensions among various ethnic groups and to combat antisemitism.

The authorities are prosecuting persons both for violent acts and for violating laws related to Holocaust denial and reducing antisemitism. In several instances, the national or local governments have increased police protection around Jewish sites or Jewish neighborhoods in an effort to prevent attacks..

The level of violence in French society related to antisemitism has been complicated by actions of the Ligue de Défense Juive (LDJ, French Jewish Defense League), which registered in 2001. With about 300 members in 2013, the LDJ was condemned by the French Jewish establishment, which threatens court action against it. Its relations have been strained with CRIF, the umbrella body of French Jewish communities.

In July 2026, Minister for gender equality and the fight against discrimination, Aurore Bergé, presented the government's new 2026–2029 National Plan to Combat Racism, Antisemitism and Discrimination. According to Bergé, the plan follows an “unprecedented and worrying” rise in racist, antisemitic and anti-religious acts. The plan includes 55 measures that are meant to prevent racist and antisemitic acts, improve support for victims, and strengthen responses to discrimination. Examples of measures included in the plan are efforts to encourage educational visits to Holocaust memorial sites, and improved mechanisms for reporting hate crimes. Some voiced a criticism that the plan isn't ambitious enough. The plan is a second of its kind, following a similar 80 measures plan, launched in 2023 that ended last May and was 70% implemented.

A selection of other responses to antisemitism follows:

- On 20 February 2019, President Macron said that France would recognise anti-Zionism as a form of antisemitism. He also said that the government would ban three extreme-right groups which incited hatred: Bastion Social, Blood and Honour Hexagone and Combat 18.
- On 20 February 2019, after a series of high-profile antisemitic attacks and just hours after the desecration of Jewish graves, thousands of demonstrators marched in Paris under the slogan "#ÇaSuffit" (that's enough). Political figures including former Presidents François Hollande and Nicolas Sarkozy joined the march, after it was called for by Olivier Faure, first secretary of the Socialist Party and organised with the endorsement of more than 50 political parties, unions and associations. Demonstrations were also reported in 60 cities including Marseille, Bordeaux and Nantes.
- On 19 February 2019, Prime Minister Edouard Philippe said that the government was looking at new legislation to tackle hate speech on social media.
- In December 2014, the Organization of Jewish Europeans (OJE) started using humor against French antisemitism. It distributed boxes of 'Antisemitox:' the first treatment against antisemitism. They contain three sweets, several detox patches, and the text of the law stating the penalties faced by those who express antisemitic views.
- In October 2013, the French Bar Association disbarred Alexis Dubruel, a lawyer from eastern France, after he filed a motion to disqualify judge Albert Levy, because of Jewish ancestry, from presiding over a custody case. In another case, a Paris court sentenced a blogger convicted of posting material inciting discrimination and violence against Jews to eight months in prison and a $670 fine. It ordered him to pay $2,000 in damages to people he targeted.
- In November 2007, teacher Vincent Reynouard, who had already been dismissed and convicted, was sentenced to one year imprisonment and a fine of 10,000 euros for denying the Holocaust.
- On 26 October 2007, Kemi Seba, founder of the banned Tribu KA, was sentenced in Paris to five months in prison, a fine of 10,000 euros, and the forfeiting of his civic rights for five years, for inciting racial hatred and denying crimes against humanity.
- On 21 March 2006, the Commission nationale consultative des droits de lhomme (CNCDH) recommended additional measures to the government to fight antisemitism.
- On 10 March 2006, a Paris court fined the comedian Dieudonné 5,000 euro for antisemitic comments.
- In November 2006, a Lyon court fined Bruno Gollnisch, second in command of the FN, 10,000 euro for questioning the existence of the Holocaust.
- On 15 January 2006, a French court fined Yahoo $15 million for selling Nazi memorabilia.
- In November 2005, the Foundation for Shoah Remembrance distributed copies of a DVD about the Holocaust to 28,000 high school students, teachers and libraries in the Paris area.
- On 13 June 2005, Judge Emmanuel Binoche ruled that Internet service providers must filter access to the AAARGH (Association of Veteran Fans of Stories of War and Holocausts), which disseminates Holocaust denial.
- On 10 February 2005, the French Broadcasting Authority ordered the French satellite provider Eutelsat to stop transmitting broadcasts from the Iranian satellite TV channel Sahar 1, following screening of antisemitic content.
- On 13 December 2004, the Council of State banned Hizballah's al-Manar transmissions on the grounds that some of its programs were antisemitic.
- In July 2004, the Minister for Social Affairs asked the secretary general of the High Council for Integration, to evaluate government policy on the subject of combating antisemitism and to submit proposals.
- In June 2003, an appeals court in Lyon upheld editor Jean Plantin's 6-month prison sentence, for publishing works doubting the scope of the Holocaust.
- In March 2003, a conference of Catholics and Jews took place in Paris to discuss antisemitism in Europe and the place of religion in the proposed EU constitution.
- In 2003, 19 people were arrested and 5 search warrants were issued against non-identified individuals, in connection with antisemitic offenses.
- On 12 April 2003, three students, one French, one Dutch and one Tunisian, were arrested for incitement to racial hatred and antisemitism.
- In August 2002, the government outlawed the rightist group Radical Unity.
- In February 2002, French Minister of Education Jack Lang set up a commission to examine Holocaust denial at the University of Lyon III.
- In 2001, the French anti-racism group, Action internationale pour la justice (AIPJ, another name for J'Accuse) sought a court injunction to block a Nazi US web portal Front 14, which groups some 400 racist websites.
- In 2000, the split in the FN resulted in reduced activity by the main anti-fascist organizations.
- In 2000, LICRA (Ligue internationale contre le racisme et l'antisémitisme) focused mainly on combating hate on the Internet and has set up branches abroad.

== See also ==
* Antisemitism in France
- Timeline of antisemitism in the 21st century
- 2014 Sarcelles riots
- Antisemitism in 21st-century Germany
- Antisemitism in 21st-century Italy
- Antisemitism in contemporary Austria
- Antisemitism in contemporary Belgium
- Antisemitism in contemporary Hungary
- Antisemitism in Europe
- France–Israel relations
- French Jews in Israel
- History of antisemitism
- History of far-right movements in France
- History of the Jews during World War II
- History of the Jews in Europe
- History of the Jews in France
- The Holocaust in France
- Racism in Europe
- Racism in France
- Radical right (Europe)
