= Berlin attack =

Berlin attack may refer to:

- Bombing of Berlin in World War II (1940–45)
  - Battle of Berlin (RAF campaign) (1943–44)
- Battle of Berlin (1945)
  - Race to Berlin (1945)
  - Battle in Berlin (1945)
- Berlin Blockade (1948–49)
- 1982 Berlin restaurant bombing
- Bombing of French consulate in West Berlin (1983)
- West Berlin discotheque bombing (1986)
- Israeli consulate attack in Berlin (1999)
- 2016 Berlin truck attack
- 2018 Berlin anti-semitic attack
