= Chosen and Excluded – The Hatred of Jews in Europe =

2017 German and French documentary film

- German: Auserwählt und ausgegrenzt – Der Hass auf Juden in Europa
- Directed by: Joachim Schroeder, Sophie Hafner
- Original languages: German; French

Production
- Producer: Joachim Schroeder
- Cinematography: Matthias Benzing
- Running time: 90 minutes

Original release
- Release: 21 June 2017

Chosen and Excluded – The Hate on Jews in Europe is a German and French documentary film from Joachim Schroeder and Sophie Hafner about antisemitism in Europe, the Middle East and inside the Muslim community. It was commissioned by the public Franco-German TV network ARTE in 2015. It got attention in German and international media after the initial refusal of the two public TV networks ARTE and WDR to release the film. Both claimed the documentary did not live up to their standards. During the ongoing public discussion, the German tabloid Bild decided to show the documentary online for 24 hours without having the rights. Eventually, both, ARD and ARTE, broadcast the documentary on 21 June 2017.

== Plot ==
The main topic of the film is antisemitism and its modern appearance. Right- and left-wing, as well as Muslim protagonists are interviewed and their shared antisemitic views are uncovered. Also common antisemitic forms, like recurring assault on French Jewish students or the 2014 Sarcelles riots are documented. European Jews talk about antisemitic attacks. Another topic is the BDS Movement and its supporting non-government and Christian Organizations as a part of modern antisemitism. For a better understanding of European antisemitic phenomena, an insight in the Middle East is given as well. Especially the role of Hamas and Fatah in the Gaza Strip is looked at. Palestinian students and Hamas government officials are being interviewed. The whole narrative is being commented by experts throughout the film.

== Production ==
Logo of ARTE, a Franco-German public TV network

Logo WDR, a German public broadcasting network

Logo of Das Erste, the principal German public TV channel

Filming locations were Germany, France, Israel, the Palestinian territories and Hungary.

=== Refusal to release ===
Despite accepting the Film after a first review in April 2015, on 6 June 2017 ARTE program director Alain Le Diberder stated the film won't be shown because it does not meet the initial agreement, doesn't fit the editorial line and because of ARTE's quality policy. In the following days Alain Le Diberder and ARTE justified their decision in a letter to Josef Schuster, President of the Central Council of Jews in Germany and a press release. Initially, the co-producer and second involved TV network – the German WDR – refused to make the film public as well, sharing ARTE's judgement.

Only when days later Das Erste, a German public TV network related to WDR, decided to broadcast the film, ARTE followed.

== Reception ==
=== France ===
According to Johann Chapoutot, the documentary is under average. "the general thesis has an intolerable intellectual and moral grossness: roughly, a first Holocaust was done by antisemitism intoxicatd Germans (...) and a second is preparing by Arabs/Muslims who have suckle the hate of Jews with maternal milk. He also think that the casting "is intellectual manipulation" and the authors "take the spectators for stupid".

According to Samuel Ghiles-Meilhac, the "current forms of antisemitism are serious topics, especially in Europe. This documentary pretends to present them to the public and to denounce them. But, between the intentions proclaimed in the title (...) and the result, the disparity creates the sensation of a big confused and biased gêchis. He add that "the revelation flavour that animates this documentary leads to inexpressive accusations that are poorly documented. Criticize the Israeli organization B'Tselem and the French rapper Médine is legitimate. Suggesting that the first is Holocaust denier and that the second considers that "the Zionists rule the world" is libelous".

According to Nicolas Lebourg, "in this movie, which can not be called a documentary, the spectator of conspiracist videos will find himself with pleasure: the transnational anti-Israeli octopus is everywhere, beating colossal flow of money, directs the media and politics". He also think that "two typical processes of conspiracy theories are constantly used: the amalgam and the confusion between the part and the whole. The antisemitism, the anti-Judaism and the criticism of Israeli politics are treated as a single object, so that Christianity, Islam and European civilization are depicted as fundamentally anti-Jewish". About the Israeli–Palestinian conflict, the movie move from the "Palestinian president to a Nazi dignitary, through World War II through the character of the Grand Mufti only, the 900,000 men of the Waffen SS are reduced to Bosnian Muslim volunteers, and, after having reduces Nazism to the Grand Mufti, it is the Palestine Liberation Organization which is reduced to him. From here we go to Arafat, described without evolution, and on the money that Europe spend for the Palestinians. A money wasted because the palestinian territories would benefit from an economic and technological development allowed by Israel but helpless destroyed by corruption: we are there in a typical colonial representation, and at the same time as in this process of confusion between parties and totality of phenomena".

=== Germany ===
Shimon Stein, Israels ambassador in Germany 2001 to 2007, wrote in Zeit: "The documentary of hatred against Jews in Europe confuses criticism of Israel with Antisemitism. Thereby it fails to show the real problem: the classical Antisemitism." The critique was published under the title "Antisemitism—the enemy is right-wing."

Historian Michael Wolffsohn described the documentary as "by far best, smartest and historically deepest documentary on this topic, while at the same time being very much up to date and true." Berlin-based Islamism expert and author Ahmad Mansour, directly involved in the film as key advisor and provisional co-author, praised the film as "great and overdue." Götz Aly, a German historian and political scientist said: "The film documents the corrupt, Hamas-controlled 'self-administration' of UN relief funds in Gaza. Now, Arte's program director Le Diberder claims that the film lacks 'multiple perspectives'. The opposite is true."

Arno Frank, journalist by Spiegel Online, emphasized that the film had major production flaws. Mirna Funk writing in Zeit described it as a propaganda film and said it covers only very little of antisemitism in Europe, its main focus is labeling criticism towards Israel as antisemitism.

Peter Ullrich from Center for Research on Antisemitism claimed that the film had interesting details, but was poorly made and is misleading.

Both WDR and Süddeutsche Zeitung journalist Matthias Drobinski see great production flaws in the documentary. The SZ journalists furthermore claims that the film was produced out of the anger of the filmmakers, the film was less of a documentary but rather a statement or polemic. The viewer has to be on the side of the producers; if not, so the documentary indicates, the viewer will be on the side of Hamas and Julius Streicher. Matthias Drobinski concludes that a film about modern antisemitism is important, but that the lack of craftsmanship was sad.

Bild made the documentary public. On the same day, Arte responded with a press release stating that Arte had noted that Bild.de had put the documentation online on its own responsibility. "Even though this approach is strange, ARTE has no objection to the public's own opinion on the film." Furthermore:

ARTE kann und will den Film jedoch nicht durch eine eigene Ausstrahlung nachträglich legitimieren, da er, ohne dass ARTE darüber informiert wurde, gravierend von dem verabredeten Sendungskonzept abweicht. Eine solche Vorgehensweise kann ARTE in diesem wie in jedem anderen Fall nicht akzeptieren. Die Unterstellung, der Film passe aus politischen Gründen nicht ins Programm ist schlichtweg absurd: Der ursprünglich von der Programmkonferenz genehmigte Programmvorschlag sah ausdrücklich das Thema des unter dem Deckmantel der Israelkritik versteckten Antisemitismus vor – entsprechend der editorialen Linie von ARTE als europäischer Sender aber nicht im Nahen Osten, sondern in Europa.

— Original in German; ARTE,

However, ARTE can not and does not wish to legitimize the film by means of its own broadcasting since, without ARTE being informed about it, it deviates significantly from the agreed broadcast concept. Such an approach can not be accepted by ARTE, neither in this case as in any other. The hypothesis that the film does not fit into the program for political reasons is simply absurd. The program proposal, originally approved by the program conference, expressly provided the theme of anti-Semitism hidden under the cover of Israeli criticism, but in Europe and not in the Middle East, as ARTE is European.

— English translation; ARTE,

=== International ===
The Simon Wiesenthal Centre requested the European Parliament to screen the film in its chamber as a reaction of ARTE's initial refusal to broadcast the film.

== Reactions ==
Six investigators are researching the statements in the film according to the WDR.
