= Antisemitism in contemporary Belgium =

Belgium is a European country with a Jewish population of approximately 35,000 out of a total population of about 11.4 million. It is among the countries experiencing an increase in reported antisemitic incidents, mainly on social media, but a reduce in antisemitism in general in society and reduce in physical attacks on Jews.

== Legal framework: Anti-Racism Law (1981), Negationism Law (1995), Anti-Discrimination Act (2007), Penal Code ==
The legal framework governing Judaism in Belgium predates the nation's independence in 1830, originating from the Napoleonic "Organic Decrees" of 1808. These decrees integrate Jewish citizens into the civil state while regulating religious practice.

Upon the formation of the Belgian state, the Belgian Constitution of 1831, arguably the most progressive constitution in Europe, codified a unique model of "recognized religions." Under Articles 19 and 21, the state guarantees freedom of worship. Uniquely, Article 181 mandates that the salaries and pensions of ministers of recognized religions are paid by the federal government. This institutional recognition provides Jewish communities, besides financial support, with significant legal standing.

The Law of March 4, 1870, further solidified this by providing public funds for the maintenance of synagogues, ensuring that Jewish cultural and religious heritage was preserved as a public good.

Belgium continued its role as a pioneer in establishing specific legal frameworks to combat racism and antisemitism. Belgium's 1981 Anti-Racism Law (the Moureaux Law) is often cited as a landmark piece of legislation because it is one of the most robust legal shields against, and one of the first in the world to specifically criminalize, incitement to hatred and discrimination based on "so-called race," religion, descent, or origin.

The law was revolutionary for its time because it moved beyond general civil protections and introduced criminal penalties for: Inciting discrimination, hatred, or violence against a person or group, belonging to an organization that promotes or practices discrimination or segregation and discriminating in the provision of goods or services (e.g., housing or employment).

Belgium expanded this legal framework in 1995 to combat the denial of the Holocaust and promote racial equality. While many countries now have similar laws, Belgium's 1995 Negationism Law legislation was an equally a landmark moment for European human rights law. Belgium was one of the first countries to specifically criminalize "negationism"—the public denial or gross minimization of the Holocaust. It made it illegal to publicly "deny, play down, justify or approve of the genocide committed by the German National Socialist regime during the Second World War." Belgium's law is distinctive, amongst others, because it was passed with unanimous support across the political spectrum (194 votes in favor, 0 against in the Chamber of Representatives). It set a rigorous legal standard for what constitutes "gross minimization" and served as a model for subsequent EU-wide directives.

This was followed by the General Anti-Discrimination Act (2007), which broadened the scope of protection to 19 characteristics, including religious or philosophical conviction and social origin, and which applies to antisemitic discrimination.

2022–2026 reforms and Penal Code updates Recent legislative reforms have further tightened the framework: Expanded Protection: new laws (2022, 2023) granted legal recognition to discrimination based on a perceived characteristic (e.g., being targeted because one is thought to be Jewish) and discrimination by association. Under the Criminal Code (2024), a "general clause for aggravating circumstances" was implemented. This allows judges to double the minimum penalties for crimes—such as harassment, assault, or non-assistance—when the motive is proven to be hatred, contempt, or hostility based on the victim's origin or religion.

== Government policy and action plans ==
Belgium addresses antisemitism through an integrated approach, incorporating specific measures into broader national and regional, and local anti-racism and antisemitism frameworks. Central to this is the Inter-federal Coordination Mechanism for Combating Antisemitism. This body coordinates policy between federal, regional, and community authorities and is supported by a dedicated Anti-Semitism Monitoring Unit within the Federal Public Service (FPS) Justice.

At the federal level, antisemitism is a core component of the National Action Plan against Racism (NAPAR), with successive plans spanning 2021–2024 and 2025–2029. These plans focus on improving the registration of hate crimes and enhancing the judicial response to antisemitic speech. Additionally, locally there are specific action plans. For instance, the City of Brussels maintains its own Action Plan against Racism and Antisemitism, which emphasizes civil servant training and educational outreach.

== High Commissioner / Coordinator for Antisemitism ==
As of 2026, Belgium manages its fight against antisemitism through the Interministerial Coordination Committee on the Fight against Antisemitism. The current official, the national coordinator for the fight against antisemitism, overseeing these efforts at the federal level is Lieve Van den Berghe. Her appointment was part of a broader European effort to ensure every member state has a dedicated official to implement the "EU Strategy on Combating Antisemitism and Fostering Jewish Life."

Katharina von Schnurbein is the European Commission's Coordinator on combating antisemitism, based in Brussels, who works closely with national coordinators like Van den Berghe.

Unia, is the independent public institution that promotes equality and combats discrimination, including antisemitism. It serves as a knowledge and expertise centre, monitors antisemitism, publishes annual reports with analyses and recommendations on antisemitism in Belgium, negotiates and takes legal action when deemed needed.

== Legal prosecutions and convictions, notable controversies ==
The Anti-Racism Law and Negationism Law remain key tools in combating antisemitism, with ongoing prosecutions and convictions underscoring Belgium's clear commitment to addressing antisemitism and historical revisionism.

Roeland Raes, a co-founder of Vlaams Blok and a prominent figure in Vlaams Belang, was convicted of negationism in 2010 for spreading Holocaust denial theories.

Karel Dillen, key founder and longtime president of the Vlaams Blok, was associated with Holocaust denial literature, including translating a negationist pamphlet by Maurice Bardèche in 1951, but never formally convicted for antisemitism or negationism.

Publisher Siegfried Verbeke was convicted in 2005 under the Negationism Law for Holocaust denial. Laurent Louis, former independent MP, was convicted in 2015 for blog posts that minimized the Holocaust.

Schild & Vrienden, a Flemish nationalist youth group, faced prosecution in 2021 for violations of the Anti-Racism Act, Negationism Act, and Arms Act after investigations revealed its members shared antisemitic, racist, and violent content in chat groups. The content included the glorification of the Third Reich, jokes regarding the Holocaust and gas chambers, and the promotion of "great replacement" conspiracy theories. In March 2024, seven defendants, including leader and former MP Dries Van Langenhove and a Vlaams Belang employee in the European Parliament -further highlighting the links between the radical youth movement and far-right politics in Belgium, were convicted. The prosecution argued that the group functioned as a structured organization intended to incite hatred and discrimination. Evidence presented in court highlighted that the antisemitic content was not merely "edgy humor," as claimed by the defense, but part of a systematic effort to normalize extremist ideologies. The court's ruling emphasized that the denial and trivialization of the Holocaust within the group's communications constituted a direct threat to the public order and the dignity of the Jewish community. Following the verdict, the Coordination Committee of Jewish Organizations in Belgium (CCOJB) welcomed the decision as a landmark victory against the dissemination of antisemitic hate speech in the digital sphere.

In August 2019, the writer Dimitri Verhulst quoted Jewish artist Serge Gainsbourg in a polemic in the newspaper De Morgen that "Being Jewish is not a religion. No religion gives people noses like that.". He also said "talking to the Chosen is difficult". De Morgen's editor-in-chief defended Verhulst on the basis that the op-ed was "a harsh criticism on Israel's politics towards the Palestinian people." Verhulst was not sued or prosecuted.

In August 2024, Belgian novelist Herman Brusselmans published a controversial column in the satirical section of the Dutch-language magazine Humo in relation to rising tension from, and his anger toward the civilian casualties in the Gaza war, where he wrote, "I see an image of a crying and screaming Palestinian boy who is completely out of his mind calling for his mother lying under the rubble, and I imagine that that boy is my own son Roman, and the mother is my own friend Lena, and I get so furious that I want to ram a pointed knife through the throat of every Jew I meet. Of course, you always have to think: not every Jew is a murderous bastard, and to give shape to that thought, I imagine an elderly Jewish man shuffling down my own street, dressed in a washed shirt, fake cotton pants and old sandals." The column was condemned by the head of the Brussels office of B'nai B'rith International as a "blatant incitement to violence against Jews, in one of Belgium's largest magazines." The Brussels-based European Jewish Association (EJA), representing hundreds of Jewish communities across the continent, declared "to have started legal actions against Brusselmans' genocidal threats".

During the ensuing legal proceedings, the accusing parties remained completely absent from the court hearings and all key court dates. During the debates about the complaint, it became clear that both parties condemn antisemitism. In October 2024, the public prosecutor's office decided not to pursue criminal charges. The investigation concluded that the column fell under the protection of freedom of expression and was a literary/satirical work and not a targeted call for violence. The court rulings officially released Brusselmans from all accusations of incitement to hatred, violence, or discrimination, emphasizing that while the language was "offensive and shocking," it did not constitute a crime under Belgian law.

== Incidents: 1980s through early 2000s ==
The 1980s were witnessed a number of anti-Jewish attacks. The most notorious werethe 1980 Antwerp summer camp attack on families waiting with their children for a bus that would carry them to a Jewish summer camp, and the 1981 Antwerp bombing in which three people were killed and over 100 wounded. However, none of the perpetrators of these attacks were Belgian.

In April 2002, the facade of the Charleroi synagogue was sprayed with bullets. In 2003 a 33-year-old man of Moroccan descent parked a car alongside the synagogue of Charleroi, poured gasoline over the car, and set it alight in an attempt to destroy the synagogue. Authorities investigated it as possible terrorism. Prime Minister Guy Verhofstadt condemned the attack but stated that he saw no need to raise security around Jewish institutions in Belgium. Firefighters were able to douse the fire before it destroyed the building.

== Incidents: 2012-2022 ==
According to a report by the Jewish Telegraphic Agency (JTA), the number of antisemitic incidents in 2012 had been the highest since 2009. 80 antisemitic incidents were reported throughout Belgium in 2012, a 23% increase from 2011 and an overall increase of 34% since 2000. Five of the incidents involved physical attacks, three of which occurred in Antwerp.

According to a survey (2013) conducted among eight Jewish communities in eight European Union countries, 88% of Belgium Jews feel that in the course of recent years, antisemitism has intensified in their country. 10% of the Belgian survey respondents reported suffering from incidents of physical violence or threats due to their Jewish affiliation since 2008. Most of the victims did not report the incidents to the police.

In 2014 antisemitic incidents recorded by the government increased by 50% over the previous year. The increase is often dated from the May 2014 Jewish Museum of Belgium shooting. Two days later, a young Muslim man entered the CCU (Jewish Cultural Center) while an event was taking place and shouted racist slurs. A month later, a school bus in Antwerp, that was driving 5-year-old Jewish children was stoned by a group of Muslim teens. Towards the end of August 2014, a 75-year-old Jewish woman was hit and pushed to the ground because of her Jewish-sounding surname. Belgian politician Hassan Aarab, running for municipal office in Antwerp on the Christian Democratic and Flemish list, publicly apologized for antisemitic statements.

In July 2014, a doctor refused to care for Holocaust survivor Bertha Klein, telling her son "Send her to Gaza for a few hours, then she will get rid of the pain. I’m not coming". The incident was ranked as the worst antisemitic incident in 2014 by the Simon Wiesenthal Center.

In 2014 The New York Times reported on crowds of protestors near the European Parliament building in Brussels shouting “Death to the Jews!” On 14 September, a crowd that had gathered in Brussels to dedicate a plaque memorializing the Holocaust was attacked by "youths" hurling rocks and bottles. On 18 September, a synagogue in the Anderlecht neighborhood was set on fire in a suspected arson attack. These were among a series of incidents, including an ethnically Turkish butcher in Liège who put up a sign stating that he would serve dogs but not Jews, and a commuter train announcement that the next stop would be “Auschwitz” and ordering all Jews to get off, that caused growing numbers of Jews to leave, or to consider leaving Belgium. The incidents are concentrated in Brussels, where anti-Jewish activity is driven by Muslims, who constitute about a quarter of the population of the city. In June, the government earmarked $4 million for increased security at Jewish institutions.

In 2015 Prime Minister Charles Michel declared a "zero tolerance policy" towards antisemitism. His government fired the operator of a government hotline assisting victims of the Brussels bombings; the operator had responded to a call requesting assistance transferring two of the wounded home to Israel by insisting that Israel does not exist. The number of families moving from Belgium to Israel in 2015 reached a 10-year high.

In January 2019, Flanders banned the non-stun slaughter of animals, which, some Jewish and Muslim community leaders denounced as racism and a violation of their freedom of religion. From 1 September, the French-speaking region of Wallonia adopted a similar ban. These regional bans were upheld by the European Court of Justice in 2020 and the Belgian Constitutional Court in 2021. The Brussels Capital region does not limit the non-stun slaughter of animals, fully allowing Kosher slaughter.

In March 2019, a parade float featuring stereotyped Jewish figures at the Carnival of Aalst near Brussels was widely criticized as antisemitic. The float in the town of Aalst, 25 km (15 miles) from the European Parliament, featured grinning figures of Orthodox Jews standing on large piles of money. Local Jewish organisations said it was "typical of Nazism of 1939." The organizers claimed there was "never any intention to insult anyone" and defended it as "a celebration of humor."

== Incidents: 2023–2025 ==
In 2023, the Gaza war caused antisemitism to rise, with 121 antisemitic incidents reported in 2023, compared to the 57 in 2022. In April 2024, homes of Belgian Holocaust survivors in Fléron were subject to vandalism.

In May 2024, a judicial investigation was launched in Antwerp involving several mohels (Jewish ritual circumcisers) following a complaint regarding the safety of traditional circumcision practices.

In June 2024, a Holocaust memorial and a memorial for Nazi resistance fighters at park Bois de la Cambre were defaced respectively, with the latter spray-painted with a white swastika and Celtic cross. In the same month, the European Jewish Congress found in a survey that:

- Belgians who expressed aversion towards Jews was 14%
  - Significantly higher than France
- Antipathy towards Jews rose to 22% in Belgium's capital Brussels
- Antipathy towards Jews in Flanders was 16%
- Antipathy towards Jews in Wallonia was 9%
- Adherence to antisemitic prejudices was found to be significantly higher on the far left, far right and among Muslims

Whereas, in July 2024, EU's Fundamental Rights Agency (FRA) found in a survey that:

- 97% of Jews in Belgium claimed to have encountered antisemitism in their daily lives
- 70% of them hid their identity in public due to lack of safety from rampant antisemitism
- 68% of Jews in Belgium have encountered online antisemitism
  - Higher than the EU average of 61%
- 40% of Jews claimed to have avoided Jewish events due to feelings of insecurity
- 54% of Jews in Belgium claimed to have avoided certain locations for fear of being attacked

After several years of substantial decline (−60% between 2018 and 2022), in September 2024, Belgium's federal equality agency reported a brief 1,000% increase in antisemitic incidents in the two months following the outbreak of the Gaza war when compared to similar periods in previous years. In the wake of these statistics, the International Movement for Peace and Coexistence (IMPAC) raised concerns about issues of perceived bias regarding how the Palestinian-Israel conflict is presented in Belgian schools.

== Incidents: 2026- ==
In February 2026, U.S. Ambassador Bill White was summoned after he accused Belgian authorities of antisemitism in social media posts that concerned the investigation of local men performing ritual circumcisions without medical training, illegal under Belgian law. Maxime Prévot, Belgian Foreign Minister, condemned the comments and said that the investigation has nothing to do with religious discrimination but rather is a matter of child protection and medical safety. He also said that Belgium is committed to combating antisemitism. Israel criticized the diplomatic handling of the situation. In early May, two mohels that lack recognized medical licenses in Belgium, were referred to correctional court to be charged with "intentional assault or battery with premeditation against minors and the unlawful practice of medicine" for allegedly performing illegal circumcisions.

On 9 March 2026, the Synagogue de Liège old synagogue in Belgium was damaged by an explosion. While no one was hurt, Belgian authorities started a federal investigation regarding what they defined as an antisemitic incident.

In July 2026, a 28-year-old man was arrested in Antwerp's Jewish quarter after threatening one visibly Jewish man with a hammer, knocked another Jew's hat off and pushed a third before soldiers patrolling the area intervened and he was arrested by the police.

== See also ==
- Timeline of antisemitism in the 21st century
- Antisemitism in 21st-century Germany
- Antisemitism in 21st-century France
- Antisemitism in 21st-century Italy
- Antisemitism in contemporary Austria
- Antisemitism in contemporary Hungary
- Israel–Belgium relations
- Centre for Equal Opportunities and Opposition to Racism
