= Antisemitism in 21st-century Italy =

National time-specific occurrence of antisemitism

Since World War II, antisemitic prejudice in Italy has seldom taken on aggressive forms.

The ongoing political conflict between Israel and Palestine has played an important role in the development and expression of antisemitism in the 21st century, and in Italy as well. The Second Intifada, which began in late September 2000, has set in motion unexpected mechanisms, whereby traditional anti-Jewish prejudices were mixed with politically based stereotypes. In this belief system, Israeli Jews were charged with full responsibility for the fate of the peace process and with the conflict presented as embodying the struggle between good (the Palestinians) and evil (the Israeli Jews).

== Analysis ==
According to the Stephen Roth Institute for the Study of Contemporary Antisemitism, in 2000 there was a 30 percent rise in antisemitic manifestations over 1999, partly because of the Al-Aqsa Intifada. Holocaust denial has become a recurrent phenomenon in those years, and a movement for reaffirming values more consistent with traditional theology has been noted in the Catholic Church. The rising trend in antisemitism observed in the year 2000 continued into 2001–2. About 100 antisemitic incidents were reported, including two violent acts in 2001 and one in early 2002. Both sides of the parliamentary parties and extra-parliamentary group, i.e., right-wing extremists, extreme left-wingers and anti-globalization activists, have intensified their antisemitic activity. The escalation in antisemitism during 2001, may be explained by several factors: "the impact of the Israeli-Palestinian conflict; the association made by the Italian public between the September 11 attacks and bin Ladin's implication that Israel had caused 'the birth of Middle East terrorism'; and the exploitation of this atmosphere by right-wing antisemites to intensify their antisemitic activity".

The trend of 2001 showing a rise in antisemitism continued as well into 2002 and 2003. According to the ADL opinion survey which was conducted in October 2002, 23 percent harbored strong antisemitic views across Italy. 58 percent believed Jews were more loyal to Israel than their own country, while 27 percent said Jews were more willing than others to use shady practices to get what they want. According to Abraham H. Foxman, ADL National Director "These findings are especially disturbing because they show that the old, classical form of anti-Semitism, which we had hoped was long gone in Europe, continues to be resilient".

According to the Stephen Roth Institute for the Study of Contemporary Antisemitism, the number of antisemitic incidents reported in Italy in 2003 fell from about 150 in 2002 to about 80. A survey on racism in Italy commissioned by the Unione delle Comunità Ebraiche Italiane in 2003, revealed the penetration of certain stereotypes regarding Jews among Italian 14- to 18-year-olds: 34.6 percent of respondents said they agreed with the statement that global financial power is in the hands of Jews, while 17.5 percent agreed that the Jews should all go back to Israel.

In 2004, most antisemitic instances were verbal or written expressions, especially in Islamic websites and far left, anti-globalization sites and publications. In April 2004, the ADL has reported that an opinion survey of adults in ten European countries, including Italy, found some decrease in antisemitic attitudes from its 2002 findings. According to the survey, in Italy, acceptance of five antisemitic stereotypes, such as "Jews are more willing than others to use shady practices to get what they want", and "Jews have too much power in the business world", has declined.

Most antisemitic activity recorded in Italy in 2005, according to the Stephen Roth Institute for the Study of Contemporary Antisemitism, was expressed in propaganda and demonstrations, in which militants from both the left-wing and right-wing camps took part. In a report on global antisemitism, submitted by the U.S. Department of State to the Committee on Foreign Relations and the Committee on International Relations in January 2005, it was noted that surveys conducted by independent research centers confirmed the persistence of some societal prejudices against Judaism. According to the report, different public opinion surveys indicated that antisemitism was growing in Italy. According to pollsters, "this trend was tied to, and in some cases fed by, widespread opposition to the Sharon Government and popular support for the Palestinian cause" that days.

In 2006, the Second Lebanon War appeared to be the trigger for a number of serious antisemitic incidents in Italy. Anti-Israel demonstrations held during the year were marked by anti-Jewish manifestations. During 2007, the 52 antisemitic incidents recorded in Italy included vandalism, graffiti, slogans during football matches etc.'. According to the "Attitudes Toward Jews and the Middle East in Five European Countries" survey, which was conducted by the ADL and published in May 2007, 32 percent of Italian respondents answered "probably true" to at least three of the four antisemitic stereotypes tested. 48 percent of respondents thought that Jews were more loyal to Israel than to Italy. 42 percent of respondents thought that Jews had too much power in the business world. 42 percent believed that Jews had too much power in international financial markets, and 46 percent believed that Jews talked too much about what happened to them in the Holocaust. Another interesting finding, linking the Second Lebanon War with the antisemitic sentiments in Italy, was that 17 percent said that their opinion of Jews was influenced by the actions of the State of Israel. Of those, 47 percent said that their opinion of Jews was worse as a result of actions taken by Israel, while 36 percent said their opinion of Jews was better as a result of the actions taken by Israel.

According to an Observatory on Anti-Jewish Prejudice of the CDEC Foundation, 69 antisemitic incidents were recorded in 2008, compared to 53 in 2007. They included vandalism, offensive graffiti and emails against Jewish individuals and institutions. According to a survey conducted in 2008 by the Ispo Institute directed by Professor Renato Mannheimer on behalf of the Monferrato Cult, 1 Italian out of 3 thinks Jews are unpleasant people, while 1 Italian out of 4 does not consider them “fully Italian". Based on an analysis of answers, the antisemitic individual tended to be mainly male, aged 50–60, self-employed, leftist and secular. In May, the same year, a national survey published by L'Unità found widespread negative attitudes towards Jews – 23 percent of the respondents stated that Jews cannot be considered "completely Italians", 39 percent stated that Jews have a "special relationship with money", and 11 percent stated that "Jews lie about the Holocaust".

The Observatory of Contemporary Anti-Jewish Prejudice (L'Osservatorio sul pregiudizio antiebraico contemporaneo) recorded incidents of antisemitism in Italy from 2005 until 2011, with a particular focus on the internet. As the following table shows, the number of antisemitic incidents declined between 2009 and 2010, then, in 2011, rose to reach a new peak.

	Recorded Incidents
2005	49
2006	45
2007	45
2008	35
2009	47
2010	31
2011	58

A report, titled "Intolerance, Prejudice and Discrimination: A European Report," conducted by Friedrich Ebert Stiftung, a think-tank affiliated with Germany's Social Democratic Party, in April 2011, revealed high levels of antisemitism in Italy and a strong presence of antisemitism that is linked with Israel in a form of criticism of Israel. The study found that 37.6 percent of Italians believed "Israel is conducting a war of extermination against the Palestinians". More than 40 percent of Italians believed "Jews try to take advantage of having been victims of the Nazi era", and more than 25 percent of Italians agreed with the statement: "Considering Israel's policy, I can understand why people do not like Jews".

According to the Milan-based Center for Jewish Documentation's Observatory on Anti-Jewish Prejudice, in 2012, antisemitic episodes almost doubled in Italy against 2011. Observatory researcher Stefano Gatti has said: "The data shows the situation is changing, evolving negatively [...] The boom might be due to more efficient data-gathering, but the episodes have undeniably increased". According to a poll from the ADL released in March 2012, antisemitic attitudes in ten European countries, including Italy, remain at "disturbingly high levels": 61 percent in Italy has responded "probably true" to the statement, "Jews are more loyal to Israel" than their own country; 39 percent has responded "probably true" to the statement, "Jews have too much power in the business world"; 43 percent has responded "probably true" to the statement "Jews have too much power in international financial markets"; 48 percent has responded "probably true" to the statement, "Jews still talk too much about what happened to them in the Holocaust". Abraham H. Foxman, ADL National Director, has said that "The survey is disturbing by the fact that anti-Semitism remains at high levels across the continent and infects many Europeans at a much higher level than we see here in the United States".

A recent study examined antisemitism in Italy with field experiments in three areas: labor market, housing market, and social integration (amateur football). The authors found significant discrimination towards people with a Jewish-Italian name when looking for football club and an apartment, but not when seeking a job. Women with Jewish-Italian names were, however, less likely to suffer from discrimination

In 2023, the number of antisemitic incidents in Italy nearly doubled - from 241 cases in 2022 to 454 in 2023.

In November 2026, a measure to adopt the IHRA definition of antisemitism was passed by the lower house of the Italian Parliament by a 147-93 margin, with the support of Italian prime minister Giorgia Meloni. Livia Ottolenghi of the Union of Italian Jewish Communities called the measure necessary to protect democracy, saying that "the fight against antisemitism is not a partisan battle, but a battle for society as a whole".

== Selected acts of antisemitism ==
- March 31, 2002 – Modena – Antisemitic graffiti and swastikas were found on the synagogue in Modena.
- July 17, 2002 – Rome – 40 graves were desecrated in the Jewish section of the Verano cemetery.
- March 9, 2003 – Milan – Antisemitic graffiti ("RAI for Italians, no to Jews") appeared on the office of the RAI, after a journalist of Jewish origin was named director.
- January 27, 2005 – Rome – Antisemitic graffiti reading "60 years of lies, Juden Raus" (Jews Out) was spray-painted on the outside wall of a Catholic church in central Rome.
- May 15, 2006 – Milan – 40 Jewish graves were desecrated, and five destroyed, at a Jewish cemetery in the outskirts of Milan.
- July 10, 2006 – Rome – Neo-fascists vandalized the Jewish quarter of Rome with swastikas and other antisemitic graffiti.
- July 28, 2006 – Livorno – Graffiti “Israel is an evil state” was written on the walls of Jewish-owned businesses.
- August 1, 2006 – Rome – 20 shops in Italy's capital were vandalized, as what seems to be an antisemitic act – Swastikas painted on nearby walls and fliers found at the shops were signed by the Armed Revolutionary Fascists and denounced “the Zionist economy”.
- January 12, 2009 – Pisa – Red paint was thrown at the town synagogue.
- January 18, 2009 – Florence – An explosive device was found at the entrance to the Chabad house.
- January 21–22, 2009 – Rome – 2 members of the neo-fascist group Militia vandalized several Jewish-owned shops.
- May 13, 2010 – Rome – Graffiti mocking Anne Frank and a swastika were spray-painted on a wall near an old fort where Nazis shot anti-fascists during World War II.
- August 15, 2010 – Trani – “Juden Raus” (Jews out) and a swastika were spray-painted on an apartment building.
- November 19, 2012 – Parma – Red paint was thrown against the entryway of the synagogue in Parma.
- January 26, 2013 – Rome – Antisemitic inscriptions, “January 27: Holocaust, nothing but lies and disgrace” and “Israel is still the Hangman. January 27: I cannot remember. Israel does not exist, Death to the Zionists”, signed by the “Militia” organization have appeared on some of the walls in central Rome.
- January 27, 2013 – Milan – An antisemitic blasphemous inscription, “Europe belongs to the whites. Jews go back to the desert”, was sprayed on the walls of a local school.
- January 27, 2013 – Turin – A black swastika found on a memorial plaque, which commemorates four Italian partisans killed in massacres in May 1944 and April 1945.
- January 31, 2013 – Udine – an antisemitic blasphemous inscription, “the Shoah must go on”, was sprayed in town.
- February 8, 2013 – Fiuggi – Antisemitic and neo-Nazi inscriptions – “Anne Frank is a liar”, “The Shoah is a fraud” and some swastikas – appeared in the city.
- November 12, 2015 – Man attacked and stabbed outside a kosher restaurant in Milan. The attack occurred at about 8pm on Viale San Gimignano in Milan, in a neighborhood known for its cluster of Jewish institutions, including a Jewish school and the Carmel kosher pizza shop and restaurant, in front of which the attack occurred. The victim, a member of the Chabad Jewish movement, was wearing a kippah that identified him as a Jew. The victim fought off the attacker, The attacker lost the mask he wore over his face in the struggle, but the victim was knocked to the ground and stabbed seven times, including a deep gash on his face, and wounds to his neck, back, and arms. According to witnesses, the attacker twice shouted, "I kill you," in Italian.
- November 27, 2023 – Genoa - Rabbi Haim Fabrizio Cipriani was attacked with a screwdriver by an individual who shouted antisemitic remarks at him.
- July, 2025 - A French Jewish man and his son were subjected to an antisemitic verbal assault at a highway gas station in northern Italy, reportedly due to the child wearing a kippah.
- August 9, 2025 - Three unidentified assailants targeted an American Orthodox Jewish couple in Venice’s historic Rialto Bridge area, splashing them with water, shouting antisemitic slurs including “damned Jew”, and setting a dog on the husband. The dog attempted to bite his thigh, but its teeth struck the mobile phone in his pocket, preventing injury. The couple escaped to a nearby kosher restaurant.

== Responses to antisemitism ==
During the 21st century, different measures have been taken in order to fight antisemitism in Italy:

- In September 2000, 43 Veneto Fronte Skinhead (VFS) militants were charged with instigating racial hatred, after they had participated in a rally during which flags with Celtic crosses were waved and antisemitic slogans were chanted.
- In February 2001, 13 members of the Austrian Blood & Honour organization were arrested in Italy for violating the Mancino law, a law that criminalises racial, ethnic and religious discrimination as well as incitement of hate crime. It was named after Nicola Mancino who signed the law into effect in 1993.
- On October 22, 2001, Francesco Ciapanna, editor of the monthly magazine Fotografare, was sentenced to 13 months in prison for racial discrimination because of an article he published in 1998.
- On November 14, 2001, the First Court of Assizes in Milan acquitted Nicola Cucullo, mayor of Chieti, of the charges of defending genocide and fascism.
- In May 2003, 10 skinheads from South Tyrol were convicted in Bolzano under the Mancino law.
- In January 2004, Italian footballers took part in a ‘match of memory’ on the anniversary of the liberation of Auschwitz, at the Rome Olympic Stadium.
- On January 21, 2004, both the Chamber and Senate approved 2 separate proposals against antisemitism – one committing the government to “intensify the struggle against antisemitism by introducing effective measures to prevent this loathsome phenomenon” and to encourage schools, on Remembrance Day, to explore and study contemporary antisemitism and the Jews’ contribution to Italy national history.
- On February 2, 2004, Interior Minister Giuseppe Pisanu, on the instructions of Prime Minister Silvio Berlusconi, began forming an inter-ministerial committee to fight discrimination and antisemitism.
- On February 16, 2007, Mohamed Nour Dachan, head of the UCOII in Italy, and spokesman and secretary Roberto Hamza Piccardo were summoned to a preliminary hearing by the Public Prosecutor's Office in Rome for incitement to racial hatred.
- In October 2007, Several youths from the northern Italian city of Bolzano, members of the neo-Nazi Sudtiroler Kameradschaftsring, were charged under the Mancino law after they posed for photos at the Nazi concentration camp of Dachau giving the Nazi salute.
- In January 2008, police headquarters of Nuoro in Sardinia launched an inter-cultural educational campaign for teenagers, which was aimed at fighting racism, antisemitism, xenophobia and intolerance.
- In April 2008, the Jewish community of Mantova established an “Observatory on Discrimination” called Article 3, together with two Mantova associations dealing with Sinti and Roma, a gay committee and the Mantova Institute of Contemporary History.
- In May 2008, 16 skinheads were arrested and 60 more in the area around Merano (South Tyrol) were charged with violation of the Mancino Law.
- In October 2008, the Court of Cassation sentenced the editor of the website Holywarvszog to 4 months imprisonment for spreading racist ideas.
- In December 2008, all parties in the House of Representatives approved a motion on the initiatives prepared for the UN Conference against racism, racial discrimination, xenophobia and intolerance that was to be held in Geneva in April 2009.
- On July 18, 2012, the Minister for International, Cooperation and Integration, Andrea Riccardi, has announced that the Italian government is about to toughen regulations against the dissemination of sites of a racist, xenophobic and antisemitic character on the Internet.
- In early 2024, Italian police raided the homes of 24 Italians under investigation for gathering at a restaurant in the Jewish quarter in Ferrara and praised Adolf Hitler. The group also threatened to kill those who interrupted their admiration for fascism.

== See also ==
- Timeline of antisemitism in the 21st century
- Antisemitism in 21st-century Germany
- Antisemitism in 21st-century France
- Antisemitism in contemporary Austria
- Antisemitism in contemporary Belgium
- Antisemitism in contemporary Hungary
- Israel–Italy relations
