= Synagogue on Reichenbachstraße in Munich =

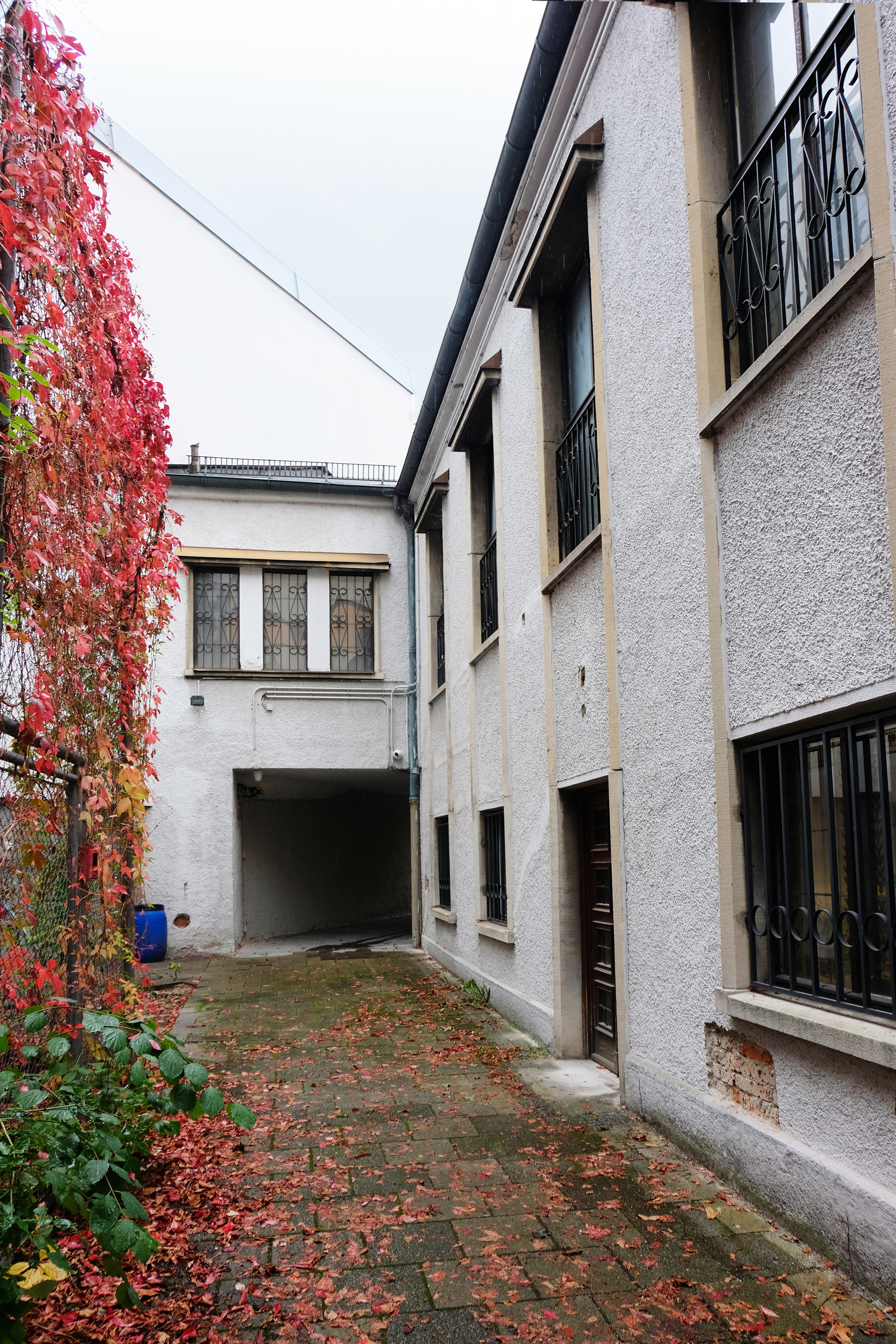
Exterior view of the synagogue (2021)

The Synagogue on Reichenbachstraße is a synagogue in Munich. The building is located in the Isarvorstadt close to the Gärtnerplatz. It was Munich's main synagogue from 1947 until 2007 when the Ohel Jakob synagogue was opened. It was reopened in 2025 after being restored from the arson attack in 1970.

== Location and building ==
The building, designed by Gustav Meyerstein (1889–1975), is located in the backyard of Reichenbachstraße 27. With a length of 27 meters, a width of 14 meters and a height of 8 meters, it can accommodate 850 people in its three aisles.

When the synagogue was built in 1931, the Kaiblmühlbach flowed next to the back of the nearby courtyard. This allowed the performance of the Tashlikh ritual. The building is protected as cultural heritage nowadays.

== History ==
=== Circumstances at the opening ===
After the beginning of the 20th century, many Jews from the East, Austria-Hungary, and Russia immigrated to Munich. After the First World War, many more emigrants from the Soviet Union arrived, so that the proportion of so-called Eastern Jews in the Jewish community eventually reached about a quarter. This group of Jews had its own sense of community and its own forms of piety—and initially, because they were not German citizens, they had no right to vote for the board of the Jewish Community. As early as 1914, the Eastern Jewish associations Linath Hazedek ("Place of Justice") and Agudas Achim ("Union of Brothers") operated a prayer room on Reichenbachstraße. In 1921, both clubs jointly bought the building at Reichenbachstraße 27 (then house number 9) from the Schwabinger Brewery AG and used the rear building as a prayer room from then on. At the beginning of the 1930s, 2,300 Jews from the East lived in Munich, making it necessary to build a new synagogue, in which the Jewish community participated.

At the opening on September 5, 1931, the rabbis of all three major Jewish groups in Munich spoke: Samuel Wiesner, the rabbi of the new Eastern Jewish synagogue, Ernst Ehrentreu of the old Ohel Jakob synagogue, and community rabbi Leo Baerwald of the then main synagogue. With the newly opened synagogue, there were now three large synagogue buildings in Munich. However, the opening was not reported in Munich's largest daily newspaper, the Münchner Neueste Nachrichten. At the time, the Eastern Jews called their synagogue Reichenbachschul (from the Yiddish word Schul for synagogue).

=== Devastation and new beginnings ===
During the November pogroms of 1938, the synagogue on Reichenbachstraße was devastated during the night of November 9-10; the fire department prevented it from being set on fire, fearing the fire would spread to neighboring buildings. Since the other two synagogues were also destroyed, the Jewish community had to seek refuge in a former tobacco factory on Lindwurmstraße. A prayer room in the former engine house remained there until June 1942. The synagogue on Reichenbachstraße was damaged by bombs during the Second World War.

After the liberation from National Socialism, the Jewish Community was re-established in 1945. By 1946, 2,800 Jews were living in Munich again. The synagogue on Reichenbachstraße was restored and ceremoniously reopened on May 20, 1947, in the presence of the military governor of the United States Zone Lucius D. Clay and other representatives of the American military government, as well as the Bavarian state government, the city administration, and the Christian denominations. Among the members of the new Jewish community were many displaced persons; the prayer order of the new prayer book corresponded to the Eastern Jewish rite, the same one that had been practiced there after the synagogue was built in the 1930s.

=== Time as main synagogue ===
After World War II, the synagogue on Reichenbachstraße was the main synagogue of the Jewish Community of Munich and Upper Bavaria. After the dissolution of the Soviet Union, many Jews from Eastern Europe immigrated again. The synagogue no longer offered enough space for the 10,000 Jews in Munich (as of 2005).

Since the opening of Munich's new main synagogue, Ohel Jakob, at St. Jakobsplatz in 2007, the synagogue on Reichenbachstraße has no longer been used as such. After the Israelite Community relocated, the liberal Beth Shalom congregation wanted to purchase the synagogue. However, this did not happen.

=== Arson attack ===
On February 13, 1970, the community's retirement home, located in the front building at Reichenbachstraße 27, was the victim of an arson attack that remains unsolved, killing seven residents who were Holocaust survivors, injuring another 15. In February 2020, to mark the 50th anniversary of the attack, a container containing photographs and information about the attack, as well as a list of those murdered, was placed on the neighboring Gärtnerplatz. In 2025, renewed investigations by the Munich Generalstaatsanwaltschaft were opened after a credible tip to the antisemitism commissioner, and according to reports citing Der Spiegel a now‑deceased Munich‑based right‑wing extremist with documented antisemitic beliefs has emerged as a leading suspect in the arson attack. In August 2026, prosecutors and police said that they had identified the deceased as the likely perpetrator of the attack, though he could not be prosecuted because he had died in 2020. They also said they that no indications of accomplices and closed the case.

=== Renovation ===
Since 2013, the Reichenbachstraße Synagogue Association, founded by Rachel Salamander and Ron C. Jakubowicz, has been committed to restoring the synagogue to its original state from 1931. In the fall of 2021, a temporary installation by the association, in cooperation with the State Ministry of Education and Culture and the Jewish Museum Munich, took place in the synagogue. This exhibition served to raise awareness of the renovation project to a wider public.

The restoration of the synagogue is complete. It was reopened in a ceremony on September 15, 2025. In a speech delivered at the reopening of the Synagogue, Chancellor Friedrich Merz was moved to tears as he emphasized that antisemitism had never disappeared from Germany and that, after the Holocaust, the Nazi period was suppressed rather than confronted with due acknowledgment of guilt. He pledged to combat all forms of antisemitism and, with reference to migration, declared: "Since October 7, it has become undeniable: in politics and society we have closed our eyes for far too long to the fact that among those who have come to Germany in recent decades, a part were socialized in countries where antisemitism is virtually a state doctrine and where hatred of Israel is taught to children already in school. Since then, we have been experiencing a new wave of antisemitism - both in its old and in new forms. That is why I promise: this Federal Government and I declare war on every form of antisemitism in Germany".

== Rabbis ==
=== Vereine Linath Hazedek and Agudas Achim ===
- Samuel Wiesner

=== Newly founded community from 1947 ===
- Aaron Ohrenstein
- Hans Isaak Grünewald
- Pinchas Paul Biberfeld
- Jitzchak Ehrenberg
- Steven Langnas
