= French Jews in Israel =

Total population
- 200,000 (2012)

Regions with significant populations
- Jerusalem, Tel Aviv, Haifa, Netanya, Ashdod, Beersheba and many other places

Languages
- Hebrew, French, Arabic, Ladino, Yiddish, formerly Judeo-French, Judeo-Provençal, Judeo-Gascon

Religion
- Judaism

French Jews in Israel are immigrants and descendants of the immigrants of the French Jewish communities, who now reside within the state of Israel. They numbered over 200,000 as of 2012.

Today, most Jews in France are of Maghrebi extraction. Most of the recent immigration from France to Israel consists of Jews of North African extraction.

Although French Jews have migrated to Israel since the formation of the state in 1948, immigration has increased since 2000 due to a surge in antisemitism. Over ten percent of the French Jewish community emigrated to Israel between 2000 and 2017.

== History ==
From 2000 to 2009, more than 13,000 French Jews made aliyah, largely as a result of growing antisemitism in the country. A peak was reached in 2005, with 2,951 olim. However, between 20–30% eventually returned to France. After the election of Nicolas Sarkozy, French aliyah dropped due to the Jewish community's comfort with him. In 2010 only 1,286 French Jews made aliyah.

By 2012, some 200,000 French citizens lived in Israel. During the same year, following the election of François Hollande and the Jewish school shooting in Toulouse, as well as ongoing acts of antisemitism and the European economic crisis, an increasing number of French Jews began buying property in Israel. In August 2012, it was reported that antisemitic attacks had risen by 40% in the five months following the Toulouse shooting, and that many French Jews were seriously considering immigrating to Israel. In 2013, 3,120 French Jews immigrated to Israel, marking a 63% increase over the previous year. In the first two months of 2014, French Jewish aliyah increased precipitously by 312% with 854 French Jews making aliyah over the first two months. Immigration from France throughout 2014 has been attributed to several factors, of which includes increasing antisemitism, in which many Jews have been harassed and attacked by a fusillade of local thugs and gangs, a stagnant European economy and concomitant high youth unemployment rates.

During the first few months of 2014, the Jewish Agency for Israel continued to encourage an increase of French aliyah through aliyah fairs, Hebrew-language courses, sessions which assist in potential olim to find jobs in Israel, and immigrant absorption in Israel. A May 2014 survey revealed that 74 percent of French Jews consider leaving France for Israel where of the 74 percent, 29.9 percent cited antisemitism. Another 24.4 cited their desire to "preserve their Judaism," while 12.4 percent said they were attracted by other countries. "Economic considerations" was cited by 7.5 percent of the respondents. By June 2014, it was estimated by the end of 2014 a full 1 percent of the French Jewish community will have made aliyah to Israel, the largest in a single year. Many Jewish leaders stated the emigration is being driven by a combination of factors, including the cultural gravitation towards Israel and France's economic woes, especially for the younger generation drawn by the possibility of other socioeconomic opportunities in the more vibrant Israeli economy. During the Hebrew year 5774 (September 2013 – September 2014) for the first time ever, more Jews made Aliyah from France than any other country, with approximately 6,000 French Jews making aliyah, mainly fleeing rampant antisemitism, pro-Palestinian and anti-Zionist violence and economic malaise with France becoming the top sending country for aliyah as of late September 2014.

In January 2015, events such as the Charlie Hebdo shooting and Porte de Vincennes hostage crisis created a shock wave of fear across the French Jewish community. As a result of these events, the Jewish Agency created an aliyah plan for 120,000 French Jews who wish to make aliyah. In addition, with Europe's stagnant economy as of early 2015, many affluent French Jewish skilled professionals, businesspeople and investors have sought Israel as a start-up haven for international investments, as well as job and new business opportunities. In addition, Dov Maimon, a French Jewish émigré who studies migration as a senior fellow at the Jewish People Policy Institute, expects as many as 250,000 French Jews to make aliyah by the year 2030.

Hours after an attack and an ISIS flag was raised on a gas factory Saint-Quentin-Fallavier attack near Lyon where the severed head of a local businessman was pinned to the gates on June 26, 2015, Immigration and Absorption Minister Zeev Elkin strongly urged the French Jewish community to move to Israel and made it a national priority for Israel to welcome the French Jewish community with open arms. Immigration from France is on the rise: in the first half of 2015, approximately 5,100 French Jews made aliyah to Israel marking 25% more than in the same period during the previous year.

With the November 2015 Paris attacks committed by suspected ISIS affiliates in retaliation for Opération Chammal, some Israeli media sources claimed more than 80 percent of French Jews are considering making aliyah while others noted that French Jews realized that not just Jews but French people in general were now indiscriminate targets of jihadist terrorism. In 2015, a total of 7,835 French people moved to Israel. This dropped to about 5,200 in 2016 and 3,500 in 2017. In 2019, 2227 people immigrated from France, a 7.8% decrease from the 2018 immigration figure of 2416 total immigrants.

== Notable people ==
- Sarah Adler, French-Israeli actress
- Dov Alfon
- Jonathan Assous
- Yoni Chetboun
- Riff Cohen
- Daniel Cukierman (born 1995), Israeli tennis player
- Patrick Drahi
- Michal Escapa
- Nadav Guedj, Israeli singer and actor
- Emmanuel Halperin
- Sharren Haskel
- Natan Levy, mixed martial artist, born in France and raised in Israel, competes in the UFC
- Yael Naim, Israeli-French singer-songwriter
- Rudy Rochman
- Gilad Shalit
- Amir Haddad, French–Israeli singer
- Ilana Avital, Israeli singer and actress

== See also ==
- Aliyah
- France–Israel relations
- French language in Israel
- History of the Jews in France
- Jewish ethnic divisions
