= Antisemitism in contemporary Hungary =

Antisemitism in contemporary Hungary principally takes the form of negative stereotypes relating to Jews, although historically it manifested itself more violently. Studies show antisemitism has become more prevalent since the fall of Communism, particularly among the younger generations. Surveys performed from 2009 and beyond have consistently found high levels of antisemitic feelings amongst the general population.

The Fidesz government of Hungary has frequently made use of Soros-conspiracy theories, based in antisemitic tropes, in its propaganda and electoral programmes.

== History ==
The Tiszaeszlár affair was an 1882–1883 murder case which has been described as a blood libel. Antisemitism increased significantly during the early-20th-century Red Terror, a period of communist rule. The Hungarian Soviet Republic was led by Béla Kun, a man of Jewish heritage. During the White Terror, a roughly two-year period after the short-lived Soviet Republic, counter-revolutionary soldiers used violence to try to end the regime. Antisemitism mushroomed during the interwar period (especially the late 1930s), leading to massive deportations during World War II.

During the second communist period, after the war, antisemitism was seen as part of a fascist ideology and its literature was destroyed. Hungary's antisemitic interwar and wartime leaders were portrayed negatively in communist Hungary. Antisemitism and anti-Zionism were practiced by the state (as in the USSR, Czechoslovakia and other Soviet satellites), however, intensifying from 1949 to Stalin's death in 1953.

After Hungary's 1989 transition from communism to capitalism and the introduction of free speech and a free press, nostalgia for the Miklós Horthy era and the writings of Albert Wass appeared and antisemitism re-emerged. Whether economic and social changes fed the sudden increase in antisemitism or covert hostility toward Jews surfaced as a consequence of new civil liberties is debated.

Post-communist capitalism has led to "social nationalism"; racism, xenophobia, fundamentalism, and antisemitism are identity- and culture-based pseudo-response to real socio-economic problems. A socio-political cleavage structure in Hungary, reflecting historical contradictions between notions of progress and nationhood, is said to have created a situation in which high-status groups attempted to transform antisemitism into a mobilizing cultural code. In his concept of "national antisemitism", Klaus Holz emphasised the image of the Jew as a universal and threatening "non-identity", destroying other identities and communities. That image has led to the perception of the Jew as perpetrator and Hungary as victim.

During the post-communist era, antisemitism appeared on the periphery and in the mainstream. On the periphery, antisemitic and neo-Nazi groups emerged and were supported by Hungarian fascists abroad. Hungarian neo-Nazi ideologues included extreme-right publicists and writers. Hunnia Füzetek and Szent Korona (newspapers established after the transition) were the first to bring back the motifs of traditional antisemitism and merge them with postwar elements, particularly Holocaust denial. Mainstream antisemitism, promulgated by intellectuals such as István Csurka (who participated in the anticommunist opposition's activities and was prominent in political life after the 1989 transition), appeared in public discourse.

In the 21st century, antisemitism in Hungary has evolved and acquired an institutional framework. Verbal and physical aggression against Jews (and Roma) have escalated, a significant difference from the antisemitism of the 1990s. The conservative Jobbik party received 17 percent of the vote in the April 2010 national election. The far-right subculture, from nationalist shops to nationalist and neo-Nazi festivals and events, has played a major role in the institutionalization of Hungarian antisemitism. Contemporary antisemitic rhetoric has been updated and expanded, but is still based on older canards. Traditional accusations and motifs include such phrases as "Jewish occupation", "international Jewish conspiracy", "Jewish responsibility" (for the Treaty of Trianon), "Judeo-Bolshevism", and the blood libel. This trend has been reinforced by references to the "Palestinization" of the Hungarian people, (Note: An ideology based on the idea that "Zionist crimes" are no longer limited to the Middle East, but also extend to Hungary; parallels are claimed between the alleged "genocide" of the Palestinians and the fate of Hungarians.) the reemergence of the blood libel, and an increase in Holocaust relativism and denial; monetary crises have revived references to the "Jewish banker class".

=== 2013 World Jewish Congress protest ===
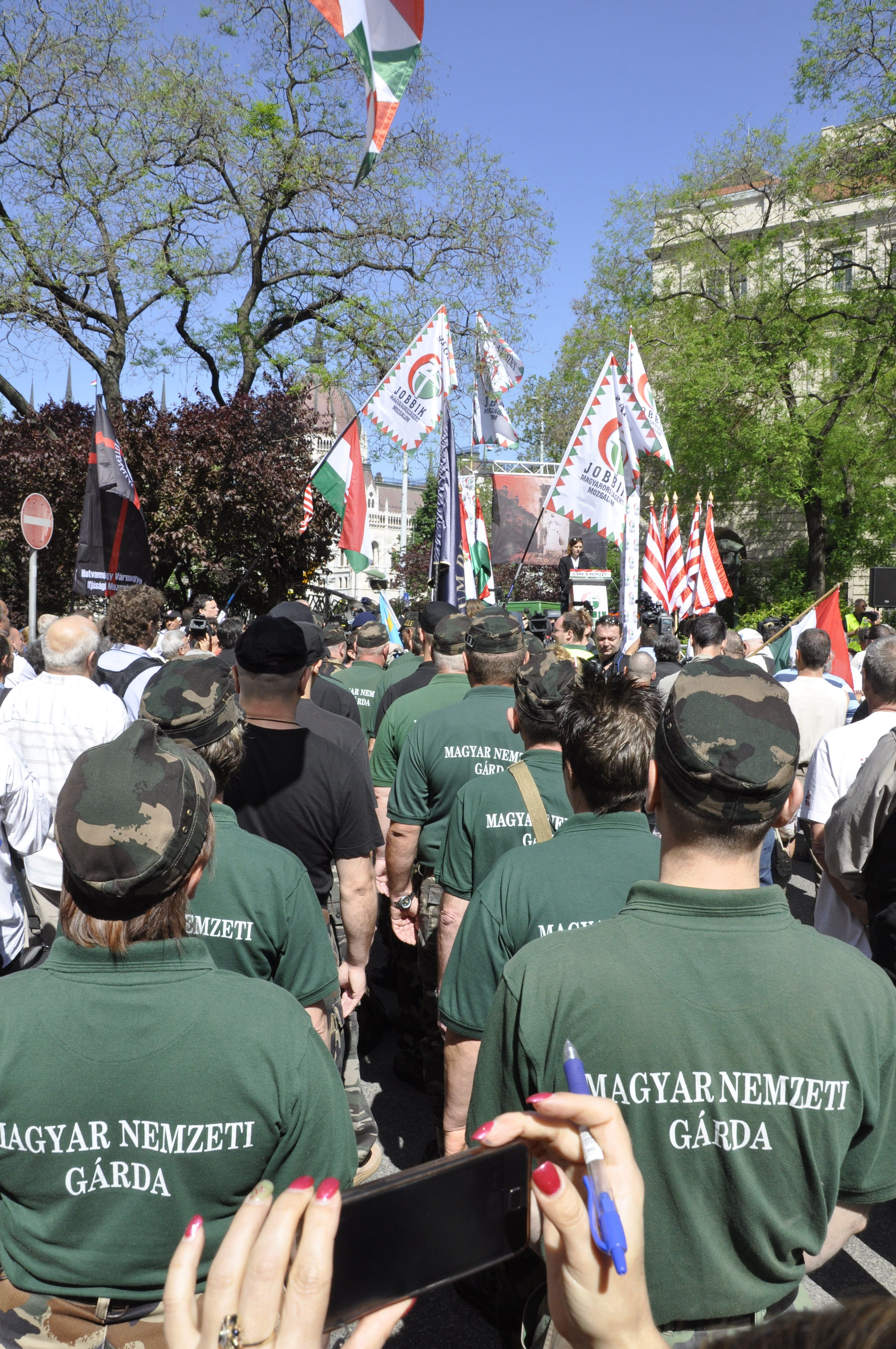
Members of the New Hungarian Guard stand at a Jobbik rally against a gathering of the World Jewish Congress in Budapest, 4 May 2013

On 4 May 2013, Jobbik members protested against the World Jewish Congress in Budapest, claiming that the protest was against "a Jewish attempt to buy up Hungary". Jobbik MP Enikő Hegedűs vociferously condemned both Israel and Jews at the rally as her husband, Lóránt Hegedűs Jr., stood nearby.

== Analysis ==
=== Data ===
In the years 1994–2006, between 10% and 15% of the Hungarian adult population were found to be strongly antisemitic. Anti-Jewish sentiment responded to political campaigns: antisemitism increased in election years and then fell back to its previous level. This trend altered after 2006, and the surveys indicate an increase in prejudice since 2009.

Support for anti-Jewish views, 1994–2011
	Percent who...	Year				
	Percent who...	1994	1995	2002	2006	2011
Jewish intellectuals control the press and cultural sphere.	Fully agree	12	-	13	12	14
Jewish intellectuals control the press and cultural sphere.	Agree	18	-	21	19	21
There exists a secret Jewish network determining political and economic affairs.	Fully agree	9	-	8	10	14
There exists a secret Jewish network determining political and economic affairs.	Agree	14	-	14	17	20
If would be best if Jews left the country.	Fully agree	11	5	5	3	8
If would be best if Jews left the country.	Agree	12	5	6	7	12
In certain areas of employment, the number of Jews should be limited.	Fully agree	8	-	3	5	7
In certain areas of employment, the number of Jews should be limited.	Agree	9	-	9	10	12
The crucifixion of Jesus is the unforgivable sin of the Jews.	Fully agree	15	23	8	8	9
The crucifixion of Jesus is the unforgivable sin of the Jews.	Agree	11	23	9	12	12
The suffering of the Jewish people was God's punishment.	Fully agree	12	17	7	7	5
The suffering of the Jewish people was God's punishment.	Agree	12	17	10	7	9
Jews are more willing than others to use shady practices to get what they want.	Fully agree	-	-	-	8	9
Jews are more willing than others to use shady practices to get what they want.	Agree	-	-	-	13	17
The Jews of this country are more loyal to Israel than to Hungary.	Fully agree	-	-	-	8	12
The Jews of this country are more loyal to Israel than to Hungary.	Agree	-	-	-	15	15

Trends in Antisemitic Attitudes in Hungary
Statement	Year	Percent responding "probably true"
Jews are more loyal to Israel than to this country.	2012	55%
Jews are more loyal to Israel than to this country.	2009	40%
Jews are more loyal to Israel than to this country.	2007	50%
Jews have too much power in the business world.	2012	73%
Jews have too much power in the business world.	2009	67%
Jews have too much power in the business world.	2007	60%
Jews have too much power in international financial markets.	2012	75%
Jews have too much power in international financial markets.	2009	59%
Jews have too much power in international financial markets.	2007	61%
Jews still talk too much about what happened to them in the Holocaust.	2012	63%
Jews still talk too much about what happened to them in the Holocaust.	2009	56%
Jews still talk too much about what happened to them in the Holocaust.	2007	58%
Trends in Antisemitic Attitudes in Hungary according to the Anti-Defamation League surveys of attitudes toward Jews in Europe.

According to the ADL survey conducted in January 2012, "disturbingly high levels" of antisemitism were to be found in ten European countries, including Hungary. The data shows that in Hungary, the level of those who answered "probably true" to at least three of the four traditional antisemitic stereotypes tested rose to 63 percent of the population, compared with 47 percent in 2009 and 50 percent in 2007. Abraham H. Foxman, ADL National Director, has said that: "In Hungary, Spain, and Poland the numbers for antisemitic attitudes are literally off-the-charts and demand a serious response from political, civic, and religious leaders". Regarding the 2007 ADL survey, Foxman has said:

"The increase and high percentage of respondents in Hungary who hold negative views of Jews are disturbing. More than a decade after the fall of Communism, we hoped that such anti-Jewish attitudes would have begun to diminish rather than increase".

The ADL Global 100 survey released in 2014 reported that Hungary is the most antisemitic country in Eastern Europe, with 41% of the population harboring antisemitic views. Unlike most of Europe, the level of antisemitism in Hungary is highest among the young, at the rate of 50% among adults under the age of 35.

=== Socio-psychological analysis ===
Scholars were divided as to whether post-communist antisemitism – on the background of a cleavage structure with the main divide being between universalist Westernization and particularist nationalist – has become a cultural code that plays a central role in political mobilization in Hungary. In a broader context of the historical Jewish role in the process of Westernization, the relationship to Jewry seems to be, for Viktor Karády, one of the main sources of the present ideological division. Sociologist András Kovács, on the contrary, argues that there is not only an increase in the absolute percentage of antisemites but also an increase in the proportion of antisemites who embed their antisemitism in the political context and who would be inclined, under certain circumstances, to support antisemitic discrimination. This phenomenon is linked with the appearance on the political scene of Jobbik, the far-right Hungarian party. According to Kovács, the causes of contemporary antisemitism in Hungary have not changed for the past decade: certain attitudes such as general xenophobia, anomie, law-and-order conservatism, and nationalism correlate significantly with antisemitism and well explain its potency. Moreover, as previous research has shown, there is a small correlation between antisemitic prejudice and socio-demographic and economic indicators. These attitudes do not obtain the same intensity in each social milieu and in each region in Hungary, and the differences correlate with the strength of Jobbik's support in the various regions.

Those findings have led to Kovács' hypothesis that antisemitism is mainly a consequence of an attraction to the far-right rather than an explanation for it. When examining the far-right antisemitic discourse in order to substantiate his hypothesis, Kovács has found that the primary function of the discourse is not to formulate anti-Jewish political demands but to develop and use a language that clearly distinguishes its users from all other actors in the political area. By doing so, those who reject antisemitic language are presented as supporters of the current political establishment, while those who use antisemitic language depict themselves as radical opponents of that establishment, and do not hesitate to capitalize on pseudo-revolutionary resentments.

By examining anti-Jewish prejudice in contemporary Hungary in accordance with a socio-psychological causal model, (Note: There are three approaches to explain prejudices: Personality – An approach that sees prejudices as being rooted in deep psychological processes, both conscious and unconscious. In compliance with this approach, the authoritarian personalities are particularly inclined to accept general ethnocentric and specific antisemitic attitudes.; Social learning – An approach that avoids using psychoanalytic concepts and sees prejudice primarily as learned via socialization.; Group conflict – An approach that sees prejudice as a result of conflicts, real or imagined, between groups.; According to the model, the three approaches to prejudices should be conceived as complementary theories rather than mutually exclusive.) Bojan Todosijevic and Zsolt Enyedi have found that:

1. Antisemitic attitudes are independently related to authoritarianism and parents' attitudes in approximately equal degree.
2. Authoritarianism appears to be the most important explanatory variable for both children's and parents' antisemitic attitudes.
3. Social mobility may lead to increased antisemitism.

=== Antisemitism in subcultures ===
During the post-communist era, the quickly emerging extreme-right subculture also strengthened the traditional anti-Roma attitude. Many neo-Nazi, Hungarist, and "nationalist rock" bands came into being and use extremely racist language and symbols, including HunterSS, White Storm, Endlösung, and others. These and many other bands perform at illegal concerts, as well as at the infamous Hungarian Island Festival (Magyar Sziget). These events typically involve the use of banned symbols, uniforms, lyrics, banners, and signs. This subculture is linked with nationalistic demands for Trianon revisionism, a narrative that is extremely irredentist and which includes antisemitic perspectives. Followers of this subculture posit the ancient Hungarian culture as superior, and they follow their own syncretic religion, which merges pre-Christian Hungarian paganism with Christianity, in contrast to the traditional Judeo-Christian revelation. Another segment of the subculture is the nationalist hobby associations, such as the "Goy motorists" and the "Scythian motorcyclists". Other elements include the more seriously organized group Pax Hungarica, and the illegal paramilitary Hungarian National Front, a group which regularly runs training camps for its members, who consider themselves followers of the fascist-Hungarist tradition.

=== Antisemitic discourse ===
The anti-Zionism and Moscow-initiated intensifying attacks on so-called "rootless cosmopolitans" (at its peak from 1949 to the death of Stalin in 1953) that ruled the mainstream discourse during communism did not disappear after the 1989 transition, and it sometimes re-emerged in the form of antisemitism. In the early years of the post-communist era, antisemitism in far-right papers and radio broadcasts was common but of limited impact. According to both Jewish and non-Jewish public opinion polls conducted in the past few years, antisemitism in Hungary has gained strength in recent years, or, at the very least, has become more pronounced in public discourse. It manifests itself mainly in the media and in the street, and antisemitic voices increase in volume during election campaigns in particular. In Hungary's right-wing newspapers, antisemitism is still present, with Hungary's Jews depicted as being inherently "other". To that end, speaking out against antisemitism is discouraged as "those who point to Hungarian complicity in the Holocaust, as well as those who speak of Hungarian raiders in the tenth century, are out to depict Hungarians in an unjustifiably negative light." Nevertheless, according to János Gadó, an editor for Hungary's Jewish periodical, Szombat, antisemitism should not be seen as a characteristic of the right-wing alone; it is an increasing problem on the left of the political spectrum, as it is shrouded in criticism of Israel's policies. "A significant proportion of the anti-Jewish rhetoric in Hungary's right-wing press is characterized by the left-wing's language of anti-Zionism ... according to this Israel is 'oppressive,' 'racist', and tramples on the rights of Palestinians".

=== Attitudes of Hungarian Jews towards antisemitism ===
A survey of contemporary Hungarian Jewry conducted in 1999 by the Institute for Minority Studies of the Institute of Sociology at Loránd Eötvös University in Budapest asked a series of questions designed to determine how Jews perceived the extent of antisemitism in Hungary. It found that 32 percent of respondents perceived little antisemitism in contemporary Hungary, 37 percent thought that there was a high level of antisemitism, and 31 percent thought that there was neither a high nor a low level of antisemitism. In response to questions asking whether people believed that there had been an increase or decrease in antisemitism in Hungary "in the recent past", 63 percent said they thought that antisemitism had increased. When asked how they formed these opinions, it appeared that respondents' attitudes towards the intensity and range of antisemitism in contemporary Hungary were based primarily on media reports rather than on the personal experience of any antisemitic incident.

== The Orbán government and antisemitism ==
=== Soros-conspiracy theories ===
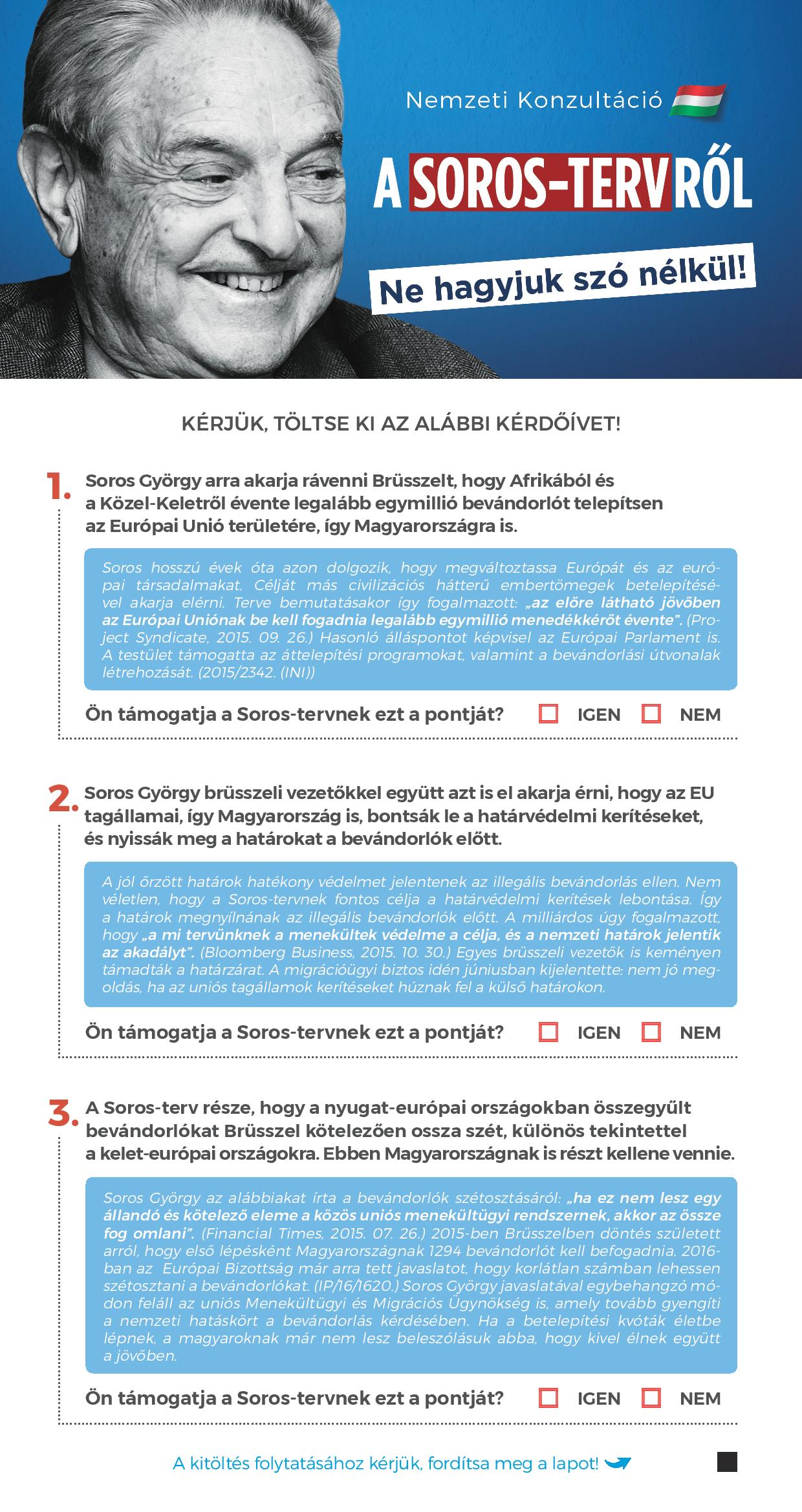
2017 Hungarian anti-Soros government campaign propaganda

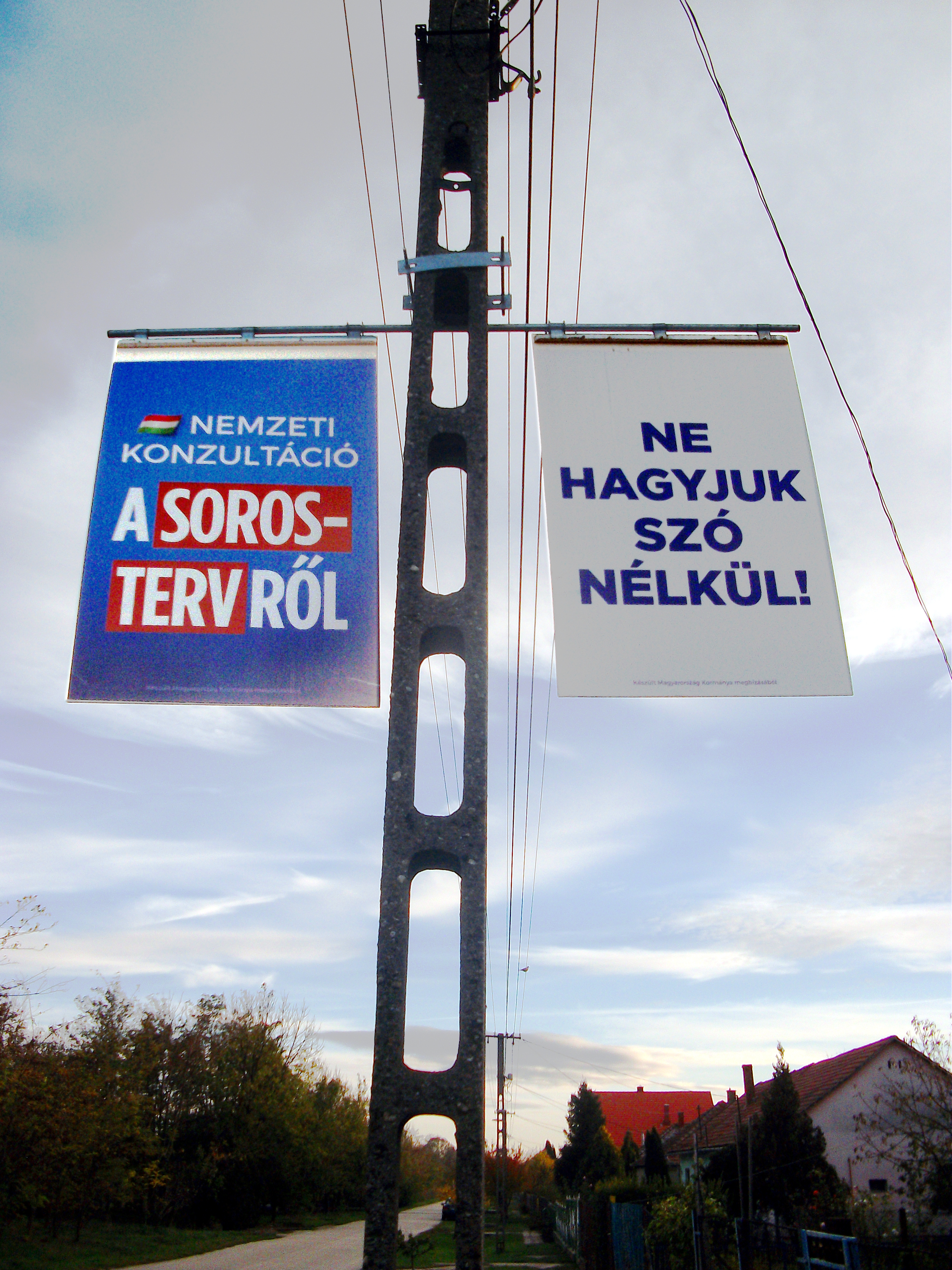
2017 Billboards of national consultation on the Soros plan in Zichyújfalu, Fejér County, Hungary

The government of Viktor Orbán has frequently given voice to antisemitic conspiracy theories regarding the Hungarian-born Jewish financier George Soros.

Anti-Soros conspiracy theories in Hungary originated in 1993, with the work of István Csurka, a far-right intellectual who depicted Soros as an anti-patriotic globalist Jewish financier capable of controlling governments. This depiction is based on the antisemitic trope of the "Jewish puppet-master". At the time Orbán, who was a student at Oxford University, strongly criticised this depiction as antisemitic. Csurka continued publishing antisemitic propaganda throughout the 1990s and 2000s, referring to a supposed "Jewish ruling class" and referring to local Hungarian politicians "the local wisemen of the Jewish world liberalism". This antisemitism would influence the far-right Jobbik party and feed into the antisemitic conspiracy theories spread by the Fidesz party in the late 2010s.

Orbán's Fidesz party government, which came to power in 2010, began to confront NGOs, including those associated with Soros in 2014, as part of Orbán's policy of an "illiberal state". Fidesz's discourse at this point painted Soros as part of a wider, foreign-inspired, conspiracy involving NGOs and civil society groups hostile to Fidesz which were intent on undermining Hungary's national interests. Pentilescu and Kustan see the inspiration for this in the tactics used by the governments of Vladimir Putin and Benjamin Netanyahu to delegitimise criticism of their policies.

Following the refugee crisis of 2016, the limited success of Orbán's campaign against Brussels' plan to set refugee quotas for member nations led Fidesz to reframe the refugee crisis as a conspiracy led by Soros. The government unveiled a mass-campaign of posters urging Hungarians to "Stop Soros", portraying the financier as a puppet master and employing the antisemitic trope of the Jews as an alien fifth column working against their host society. These claims were given very extensive coverage by state and pro-Fidesz television, radio and newspapers, with frequent use of terms such as "Soros plan", "Soros agent", "Soros organisation" and "Soros network".

In 2017, the government introduced a national consultation on the so-called "Soros plan". Following this they introduced the "Stop Soros" legislative package which they justified as being an attempt to stop Soros's supposed sponsorship of illegal immigration into Europe. The conspiracy theories alleged that Soros was behind a plan to let one million Muslims a year into Europe, aided by global political bodies over which he exercised control. This rhetoric overtly utilised elements of the Great Replacement conspiracy theory, some versions of which depict Jews plotting to undermine majority-white societies by importing non-white immigrants.

In this climate, Fidesz approved laws limiting the role of NGOs and foreign-based universities. This allowed the dismantling of the Soros-backed CEU university, viewed by Fidesz as a centre of opposition to its rule.

== See also ==
- Timeline of antisemitism in the 21st century
- Antisemitism in 21st-century Germany
- Antisemitism in 21st-century France
- Antisemitism in 21st-century Italy
- Antisemitism in contemporary Austria
- Antisemitism in contemporary Belgium
- Israel–Hungary relations
