= Antisemitism in 21st-century Germany =

Aftermath of an antisemitic arson attack on a Holocaust book box in front of the Berlin-Grunewald station, the station was the principal location for deporting Berlin Jews to the East during the Holocaust

Antisemitic incidents have increased in contemporary Germany. Since the Halle synagogue shooting in 2019 and the COVID-19 pandemic, antisemitism has increasingly entered public discussion. According to the Federal Criminal Police Office, the Gaza war and genocide have caused increased tensions between Muslims and Jews in Germany and a spike in antisemitic hate crimes and assaults. The election of the far-right AfD to the Bundestag in 2017 has stirred controversy due to some of the party's leaders expressing their wish to "move on" from Germany's Culture of Remembrance (Erinnerungskultur).

== Context ==
In 1998, Ignatz Bubis, a leader of the German Jewish community, observed an "intellectual nationalism" of possible concern. More recently, Germany's growing Muslim population, both Turkish "guest workers" who arrived in the 1950s to 1970s, and the especially the large wave of migrants from Muslim countries who arrived during the European migrant crisis that began in 2015 have been discussed as causes of antisemitic activity.

== Extent ==
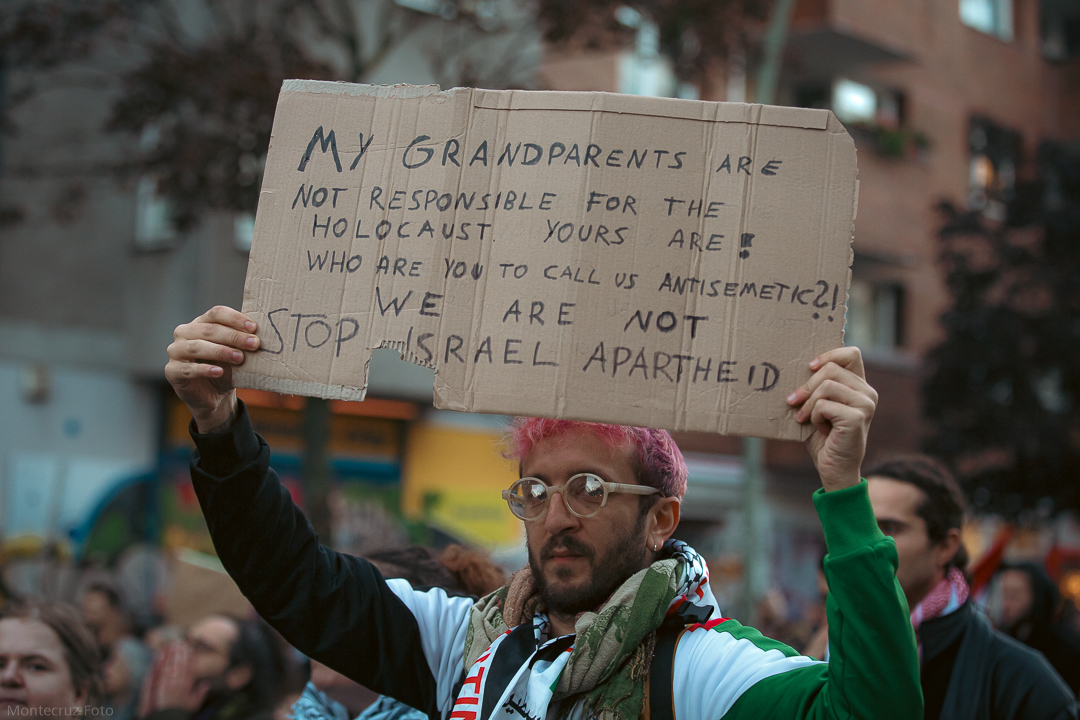
Pro-Palestinian protest against Israel's war in Gaza. Characterization of Israeli policies as apartheid as weaponization of antisemitism in Germany

A 2012 poll showed that 18% of the Turks in Germany think of Jews as inferior human beings. A similar study found that most of Germany's native born Muslim youth and children of immigrants have antisemitic views.

In 2014, antisemitic activities prompted German Chancellor Angela Merkel to lead a rally in Berlin against antisemitism in Germany. In the same year, about 3,500 people rallied in front of the Frankfurt City Hall to protest against a wave of antisemitic incidents in Germany. A few hundred of the protesters were from the Kurdish-Israeli Friendship Association. According to the JTA, "Merkel expressed her support for the event in a letter."

The number of crimes against Jews and Jewish institutions continued to increase in 2018. In a 2018 survey conducted by the European Union, 85% of Jewish respondents in Germany said that antisemitism was a "very big" or "fairly big" issue, and 89% said that antisemitism had become a worse problem in the last five years. In February 2019, crime data released by the government for 2018 and published in Der Tagesspiegel indicated 1,646 crimes linked to a hatred of Jews. There was a 60% rise in physical attacks (62 violent incidents, vs 37 in 2017). Germany also reported a new record number of cases linked to hatred of Jews in 2020, with 2,275 crimes.

View source data.
Perpetrators of antisemitistic verbal harassment and physical assault. Characterisation of antisemitic attackers as reported by Jewish victims in an online questionnaire. An attacker may belong to more than 1 group.

A June 2024 survey found that antisemitism in Germany was very high, citing "extreme violence", with as much as an 83% spike in incidents compared to the prior year. In 2023 alone, 5,164 antisemitic offenses were recorded by the Federal Police.

According to Germany's Federal Association of Departments for Research and Information on Antisemitism (RIAS) reporting and support network, since 7 October 2023, there has been an average of 32 antisemitic incidents per day in Germany, up from an average of seven in 2022. According to a separate report by RIAS, 1,383 antisemitic incidents were recorded in Berlin alone during the first half of 2024. This amounts to an average of seven to eight incidents per day. It is the highest number of reported antisemitic incidents in Berlin in a single year since documentation began.

In November 2024, Berlin's police chief, Barbara Slowik, warned Jewish and LGBT residents of the city to be more careful in Arab-majority neighborhoods of the city where locals often have sympathy for terrorist groups. In these neighborhoods, there has been an increase in antisemitic and racist incidents, which is why she advises, "who wear a kippah or are openly homosexual or lesbians to be more attentive".

According to a report by the Federal Criminal Police Office (BKA), Germany recorded 1,047 antisemitic crimes, including two attempted murders, in the first three months of 2025. 2,197 antisemitic incidents were recorded in Berlin in 2025.

== Sources ==
As per German police statistics, over 90 percent of antisemitic incidents are committed by "followers of the far‑right". However, government officials and Jewish community leaders doubt the figure, because cases with unknown perpetrators and some kinds of attacks get automatically classified as "far‑right".

A 2017 study on Jewish perspectives on antisemitism in Germany by Bielefeld University found that individuals and groups belonging to the extreme right and extreme left were equally identified as perpetrators of antisemitic harassment and assault by survey participants, while the largest part of the attacks were committed by Muslim assailants. The study also found that 70% of the survey respondents feared a rise in antisemitism due to immigration, citing the antisemitic views of many migrants and refugees. A study among Jews, published by the European Union in 2018, has also listed Muslims as the major perpetrators of antisemitic incidents in Germany. 41% of such attacks were committed by perpetrators identified as “extremist Muslims”, 20% by far-right and 16% by “far-left extremists”.

In its 2017 summary, the Federal Office for the Protection of the Constitution (BfV) concluded that antisemitic rhetoric spread by Islamist organizations posed a significant challenge to the contemporary peaceful and tolerant society of Germany.

== Incidents ==
=== 2017 ===
In January 2017, a German court in Wuppertal upheld the 2015 decision of a lower court which deemed an attempt by three Muslim attackers to burn down a synagogue in 2014 on the anniversary of the Kristallnacht "a means of drawing attention to the Gaza conflict with Israel". The offenders were not sent to prison. The German regional court ruled that the actions of the three perpetrators were "governed by anti-Israelism and not antisemitism". The attackers subsequently received suspended sentences. Green Party MP Volker Beck protested the ruling, saying: "This is a decision as far as the motives of the perpetrators are concerned. What do Jews in Germany have to do with the Middle East conflict? Every bit as much as Christians, non-religious people or Muslims in Germany, namely, absolutely nothing. The ignorance of the judiciary toward antisemitism is for many Jews in Germany especially alarming."

Dr. Moshe Kantor, president of the European Jewish Congress, said:

It is unbelievable that attempts to burn a synagogue have been equated with displeasure of Israeli government policies...This has now given a carte blanche to antisemites across Germany to attack Jews because a German court has given them a ready justification.

=== 2018 ===
- An Arab Israeli who wore a kippah was assaulted. The incident was recorded and the video went viral.
- The Echo Music Prize was awarded to rappers who featured antisemitic clichés in their lyrics. As a result of protests from artists and the press, the award was discontinued.

=== 2019 ===
On 9 October 2019, a neo-Nazi gunman attacked a synagogue in Halle during Yom Kippur. Two doors of the synagogue were damaged when improvised explosives were set off. The attacker shot and killed a woman near the synagogue and a man in a Turkish kebab shop.

=== 2021 ===
In September 2021, German police averted a possible attack on a synagogue in Hagen during Yom Kippur services, arresting four people including a 16-year-old Syrian youth.

=== 2023 ===
During an April 2023 pro-Palestine protest, the antisemitism monitoring organization RIAS and several German media outlets reported chants of "Death to the Jews". The Berlin Police have confirmed they are investigating charges of Volksverhetzung; two pro-Palestine rallies planned for the following weekend were cancelled.

On 18 October 2023, 11 days after the October 7 attacks, a Berlin synagogue was firebombed with Molotov cocktails by two masked men. Since the escalation of the Gaza war in October 2023, there has been a surge in antisemitic incidents on a scale unseen in years.

=== 2024 ===
- On 2 February 2024, a Jewish university student was hospitalized after being assaulted following an altercation related to the Gaza war. According to police, the victim was repeatedly punched in the face until he fell to the ground, after which he was kicked while lying on the floor. The assailant subsequently fled the scene. The victim suffered facial fractures, and a suspect was later located and arrested. The student is a grandson of Amitzur Shapira, an Israeli athletics coach who was killed during the 1972 Munich massacre.
- On 5 April 2024, an unknown individual threw an incendiary device at the door of a synagogue in the northern city of Oldenburg, causing a small blaze and minor damage. German police have offered a cash reward for information about the arson attack.
- According to a Jewish Independent article on 21 May 2024, Jewish parents living in Berlin's suburbs started enrolling their children at Jewish schools in Mitte, Berlin due to fears of rising antisemitism. The children of the parents concerned are enrolled at the schools closest to where they live, but they passed up the automatic registration for their children's local high school in favour of sending them to a school far from their place of residence for the alleged reason that it was protected by an Israeli guard, German policemen and an enclosed wall, while there are usually no guards at Berlin schools.
- In late June 2024, an Israeli couple in their early 20s was assaulted in Berlin's Potsdamer Platz after being heard speaking Hebrew by an Arabic speaking assailant. The assailant shouted abuses at them, threw a bottle and a chair at the woman, and punched the man who defended her.
- On 5 September 2024, a gunman opened fire at the Israeli consulate and adjacent to the Nazi Documentation Centre in Munich before being shot dead by police. The attacker had been under investigation for suspected ties to Jabhat al-Nusra.
- On 7 October 2024, 10 memorial stones, engraved with details of Holocaust victims, were torn from their spots. The day was also the first anniversary of the October 7 attacks.

=== 2025 ===
- In September 2025, a shop owner in Flensburg posted an antisemitic sign on his door reading “Jews are forbidden entry here, Nothing personal, not even antisemitism - I just can’t stand you”. The incident drew comparisons to Nazi Germany’s anti-Jewish laws. The owner claimed he opposed the war in Gaza and therefore barred entry to all Jews. After public criticism the sign was removed, though local media reported it was later displayed inside the store.
- In 2025, the Berlin Public Prosecutor’s Office reported that antisemitic crime in the city remained at a persistently high level, with 820 new offences recorded, up from 757 in 2024 and 589 in 2023. These incidents included incitement to hatred, antisemitic graffiti, verbal abuse, and physical assaults, and occurred both in public spaces and online, reflecting ongoing hostility toward the Jewish community in Berlin.

=== 2026 ===
- In February, a Jewish institution in Munich received a threatening letter containing antisemitic content and a live handgun cartridge. The envelope was detected during routine security screening and reported to police, who opened a state-security investigation and stated that there was no immediate danger.
- In April, a few antisemitic incidents took place; in Cottbus, a synagogue was vandalized twice within a few days with antisemitic marking and a swastika. At around the same time, graffiti including "kill all Jews" and Nazi symbols were discovered in Pankow district, Berlin.
- In April, police investigated an incident in which a wooden structure resembling a crematorium chimney was found outside the tax office in Eggenfelden. The structure included swastikas, SS runes and the inscription "Zyklon B". It was also examined whether the display was linked to an earlier incident at the same location involving a replica of the Auschwitz concentration camp gate. Later that month, police identified a 33-year-old suspect and seized evidence during a search of his residence. Subsequently, the Munich General Prosecutor's Office assumed control of the case through the Bavarian justice system's Central Antisemitism Commissioner, linking the investigation to both incidents.
- In June, an Israeli family, attempting to make a reservation at Hotel Zum Hirschen in Lam, Bavaria through Booking.com, received a message stating: "Sorry, there are no Jews allowed in our hotel." Booking.com removed the hotel from its listings. The hotel subsequently apologized and said that the message was a mistake 'made out of frustration at the numerous fake bookings'.
- In June, the Federal Association of Departments for Research and Information on Antisemitism (Recherche- und Informationsstelle Antisemitismus, RIAS) reported that antisemitic incidents in Germany reached 8,725 in 2025, the highest number recorded since nationwide monitoring began and a small increase compared with 2024. The report included cases such as assaults, threats, and vandalism, averaging approximately 24 cases per day.
- In June, a Jewish man wearing a kippah walking down the street in Charlottenburg (Berlin) with his two children was verbally and physically assaulted by a man who shouted antisemitic insults at him, spat at him and punched him. The attacker was arrested by local police and released.
- In July, a 15-year-old ISIS sympathiser from Augsburg was charged with preparing a serious act of violence after investigators accused him of planning an attack against a synagogue. Prosecutors alleged that he got pyrotechnic materials, prepared and detonated an explosive device.
- In July, a 65-year-old member of the German–Israeli Society was assaulted by a 20-year-old Syrian national in Höchberg, Bavaria. The attacker called on the victim because he was wearing an Israeli flag pin and then physically attacked him leading to serious injuries. Due to indications of an anti-Israeli, antisemitic and Islamist motive, the investigation was transferred to the Bavarian Central Office for Combating Extremism and Terrorism, Ludwig Spaenle, who said after the incident: "In Islamist-influenced ideas that would have led to antisemitic crimes in Germany, the attitudes of people who came to Germany and have already absorbed anti-Jewish ideas in their childhood and youth or in their environment often played a role."
- In August 2026, RIAS Thüringen reported that it had documented 418 antisemitic incidents in Thuringia during 2025, up from 392 in 2024. Incidents included 350 cases of verletzendes Verhalten (including antisemitic insults, comments and graffiti), alongside 45 cases of property damage, 10 threats, nine mass mailings and four physical attacks. RIAS also reported 244 incidents of Israel-related antisemitism, the most frequently recorded form of antisemitism in 2025. 103 incidents were classified as having a far-right background.
- In September, a 37-year-old Afghan was arrested after a fire was set at the Bergische Synagogue in Wuppertal. According to police, the suspect spread flammable liquid near the entrance and set it alight, but the fire was quickly extinguished and caused only minor damage. Prosecutors later said the suspect had made statements indicating an antisemitic motive and that knives and a machete were found in his apartment.

== Responses ==
=== Official responses ===
In October 2024, Felix Klein, Germany's Commissioner for Jewish Life and the Fight against Antisemitism, said that "open and aggressive antisemitism", which is a "poison for social cohesion", was "stronger than at any time since 1945". Also in October 2024, Thomas Strobl, Interior Minister of Baden-Württemberg, reassured the Jewish community that they will be protected amid rising antisemitism.

In September 2025, in a speech delivered at the reopening of the Synagogue on Reichenbachstraße in Munich, Chancellor Friedrich Merz was moved to tears as he emphasized that antisemitism had never disappeared from Germany and that, after the Holocaust, the Nazi period was suppressed rather than confronted with due acknowledgment of guilt. He pledged to combat all forms of antisemitism and, with reference to migration, declared: "Since October 7, it has become undeniable: in politics and society we have closed our eyes for far too long to the fact that among those who have come to Germany in recent decades, a part were socialized in countries where antisemitism is virtually a state doctrine and where hatred of Israel is taught to children already in school. Since then, we have been experiencing a new wave of antisemitism - both in its old and in new forms. That is why I promise: this Federal Government and I declare war on every form of antisemitism in Germany".

In light of reports showing a rise in antisemitic incidents across Germany, including attacks on a pro‑Israel demonstration in Kiel and controversial remarks at the Berlinale film festival, in March 2026, the state government of Schleswig‑Holstein proposed tightening criminal laws to better address antisemitism and anti‑Israel agitation. The initiative, led by Minister‑President Daniel Günther, would classify hatred against Jews and Israelis as particularly serious cases of incitement to hatred and increase minimum sentences in such cases.

On 25 August 2026, the government of Schleswig-Holstein presented an action plan to combat antisemitism and promote Jewish life. The plan includes 31 new measures, including for preventing antisemitism in schools and other educational settings, further training, possible appointment of antisemitism commissioners at state universities, consideration of Jewish holidays in examination scheduling, and a lecture series on remembrance culture and antisemitism prevention.

In September 2026, the Hamburg branch of the Christian Democratic Union (CDU) presented a twelve-point action plan against local antisemitism. The plan was developed with former Hamburg Commissioner for Jewish Life and Antisemitism Stefan Hensel. It included mandatory training on antisemitism for teachers, greater opportunities for pupils to engage with Jewish life, a city partnership with an Israeli city, and progress on the planned reconstruction of the Bornplatz synagogue.

=== Opinions and comment ===
In 2002, the historian Julius Schoeps said that "resolutions by the German parliament to reject antisemitism are drivel of the worst kind" and "all those ineffective actions are presented to the world as a strong defense against the charge of antisemitism. The truth is: no one is really interested in these matters. No one really cares."

== See also ==
- Secondary antisemitism
- Antisemitism in Europe
- Anti-antisemitism in Germany
- Timeline of antisemitism in the 21st century
- Antisemitism in 21st-century France
- Antisemitism in 21st-century Italy
- Antisemitism in contemporary Austria
- Antisemitism in contemporary Belgium
- Antisemitism in contemporary Hungary
- Geography of antisemitism
