= Antisemitism in contemporary Austria =

Evidence for the presence of Jewish communities in the geographical area today covered by Austria can be traced back to the 12th century. In 1848 Jews were granted civil rights and the right to establish an autonomous religious community, but full citizenship rights were given only in 1867. In an atmosphere of economic, religious and social freedom, the Jewish population grew from 6,000 in 1860 to almost 185,000 in 1938. In March 1938, Austria was annexed by Nazi Germany and thousands of Austrians and Austrian Jews who opposed Nazi rule were sent to concentration camps. Of the 65,000 Viennese Jews deported to concentration camps, only about 2,000 survived, while around 800 survived World War II in hiding.

Antisemitism did not cease to exist in the aftermath of World War II and continued to be part of Austrian political life and culture with its strongest hold in the political parties and the media. Bernd Marin, an Austrian sociologist, has characterized antisemitism in Austria after 1945 as an ‘antisemitism without Jews’, since Jews constituted only 0.1 percent of the Austrian population. Antisemitism was stronger in those areas where Jews no longer lived and where previously practically no Jews had lived, and among people who neither have had nor have any personal contact with Jews. Since post-war prejudice against Jews has been publicly forbidden and tabooed, antisemitism was actually 'antisemitism without antisemites', but different expressions to it were to be found in the Austrian polities. During the 80', the taboo against open expressions of explicitly antisemitic beliefs has remained, but the means of circumventing it linguistically have extended its boundaries in such a way that the taboo itself appears to have lost some of its significance. Anti-Jewish prejudices which had remained hidden began to surface and were increasingly found in public settings. Thus, verbal antisemitism was rarely expressed directly, but rather used coded expressions, which reflected one of the country's major characteristics - ambivalence and ambiguity toward its past.

Today the Jewish community of Austria consists of about 8,000 persons. The ‘Jewish Faith’ community is the fifth largest recognized religious community in Austria with the status of a corporation under public law. Nevertheless, antisemitism in contemporary Austria seems to focus more on diffused and traditional stereotypes than on acts of physical aggression. It is a main ideological component of most extreme right-wing groups and their publications in Austria. Extreme rightist and neo-Nazi groups have intensified their activities since 2000, encouraged by the FPÖ electoral success in March 1999. During the first years of the 21st century, themes directly concerned with the National Socialist past have been repeatedly debated in the public sphere: demonstrations were held against the Wehrmacht exhibition, there was controversy regarding a Holocaust memorial that was officially opened in 2000 and the question of restitution.

Latent antisemitism is an issue in several rural areas of the country. Some issues in the holiday resort Serfaus gained special attention in 2010, where people thought to be Jews were barred from making hotel bookings, based on racial bias. Hostility by some inhabitants of the village towards those who accommodate Jews was reported. Several hotels and apartments in the town confirmed that Jews are banned from the premises. Those who book rooms are subjected to racial profiling, and rooms are denied to those who are identified as possible Orthodox Jews.

According to the CFCA (the Coordination Forum for Countering Antisemitism) there were more than 15 antisemitic incidents during the years 2012–2013. Most of them included swastika graffiti, the desecration of Jewish graves, the vandalism of Stepping Stones (stones that commemorate names of people murdered during the holocaust) -- but the most intense was the expulsion of a young Hasidic man from a vacation apartment by his Judaism. In 2014 two stepping stones were again vandalized. On July that year, while operation Protective Edge took place in Gaza Strip, a training match between Israeli and Austrian football squads ended with a violent attack on the Israeli team by some Austrian pro-Palestinian fans. A few months later, a biker wearing neo-Nazi insignia waved a knife and shouted antisemitic slogans at passers-by next to a synagogue in Vienna. A monument commemorating Holocaust victims was also defaced in the capital in that year.

In the beginning of 2015 there were at least three reports of antisemitic graffiti in Austria, all on memorials for the Holocaust: in the Mauthausen-Gusen concentration camp complex, on a memorial for the Jews of Hietzing and on a wall at Salzburg. Later that year, plaques dedicated to Jewish victims of the Holocaust were desecrated in Wiener Neustadt. In July that year, a pole with a Star of David flag was toppled and sprayed with a swastika at the Religions Campus in Aspern. The act was condemned by the Archbishop of Vienna.

In August 2020, an immigrant (2013) from Syria was arrested in Graz for attacking Jews and defacing a synagogue with "Free Palestine" graffiti was suspected in an attack on a Catholic church, and on the LGBT community. It was characterized by officials as Islamist antisemitism.

== Data and analysis ==
The main source of official data on antisemitic incidents in Austria is the Federal Agency for State Protection and Counter Terrorism (Bundesamt für Verfassungsschutz und Terrorismusbekämpfung, BVT). Another source for unofficial data are two NGOs in Austria: the Forum against antisemitism (FGA) and Civil courage and anti-racism work (ZARA).

Trends in Antisemitic Attitudes in Austria
Percent responding “probably true”
- 2002
- 2004
- 2005
- 2007
- 2009
- 2012

A research study under the title “Xenophobia in Austria" which was conducted in the second half of the 1990s, found that 46% of the respondents showed a low or a very low tendency towards antisemitism, 35% were neutral and 19% were strongly or very strongly inclined to antisemitism. According to a study commissioned by the University of Linz in 2002 which aimed at measuring the significance of attitudes towards antisemitism, the rebirth of Nazi ideology, right-wing extremism and other forms of deviance through the severity of their punishment, the rebirth of Nazi ideology and right-wing extremism ranked tenth and antisemitism fifteenth among the offenses that should be more severely punished (among 25 issues included in the survey). Almost 33% of the interviewees supported more severe punishment for rightwing extremism and almost 20% for antisemitism. The number of respondents favoring less severe punishment for both categories decreased between 1998 and 2002. A recent Eurobarometer survey showed that nearly 60% of Europeans thought that Israel presented a threat to world peace, which is more than for any other country in the survey. The percentage of Austrian respondents perceiving Israel as a threat to world peace is 69%, which is higher than the average of the EU15 and second only to the Netherlands (74%) in 2003.

Recorded antisemitic offenses committed by right-wing extremists in Austria, 2001–2014
Year	Recorded antisemitic offenses
2001	3
2002	20
2003	9
2004	17
2005	8
2006	8
2007	15
2008	23
2009	12
2010	27
2011	16
2012	27
2013	37
2014	58

In explaining the antisemitic climate change during the 21st century, the FGA suggested three main developments which influenced the climate for the Austrian Jewish community: Firstly, since the beginning of public discussion during 2003 concerning restitution and restitution payments to the Jewish Faith Community as compensation for victims of war crimes, a growing extent of antisemitic attitudes towards Jewish citizens and Jewish institutions – in particular the Jewish Faith Community – has been felt. Secondly, the aggravated situation in the Middle East contributed to a negative attitude towards Jewish citizens. The FGA assumes that this is because many still do not make the distinction between the state of Israel and Jews, and hold their Jewish fellow citizens responsible for events in the Middle East. It should be mentioned that according to the annual survey conducted by the ADL in 2007, 'Attitudes Toward Jews and the Middle East in Six European Countries', Austria was one of the only two countries (together with Hungary) where more respondents cited anti-Jewish sentiment as opposed to anti-Israel feelings as the main cause of the violence directed against Jews in those countries. Thirdly, the FGA argued that a camouflaged, “coded” antisemitism evolved while the taboo against open antisemitism has weakened, but not disappeared. According to the FGA, this led to the growth of the social acceptance of right-wing extremism in Austria.

In 2015 the Fundamental Rights Agency published its annual overview of data on antisemitism available in the European Union. According to the report, there was an increase of antisemitic offences recorded in Austria. Moreover, the number of incidents recorded in 2014 (58 incidents) is the highest annual number of incidents in the period 2004–2014. Additional unofficial data included in the overview shows that 31 cases out of the 58 recorded were antisemitic graffiti incidents.

The Anti-Defamation League (ADL) published in 2015 the "ADL Global 100", an international survey conducted in 2013–2014 to measure antisemitic opinions in 100 countries around the world. The survey revealed that 28% of the adult population in Austria harbor antisemitic opinions, as reflected through the DATA: More than 50% of the population expressed agreement with the phrase "Jews still talk too much about what happened to them in the Holocaust", and more than 40% of the population agreed with "Jews are more loyal to Israel than to this country" and "Jews have too much power in international financial markets".

=== Antisemitic discourse ===
The degree of threat and hostility towards Jews expressed in language varies greatly: different forms and different degrees of directness and boldness can be differentiated according to context and speaker into four hierarchical levels of antisemitic statements:

Unofficial data on antisemitic incidents in Austria, 2003–2010
Year	Forum against antisemitism	ZARA: antisemitic graffiti
2003	134	18
2004	122	17
2005	143	10
2006	125	9
2007	62	60
2008	46	33
2009	200	86
2010	-	33

- Level 1 - Trivialization and relativization of antisemitism and the uniqueness of the Holocaust. This occurred in totally formal and official contexts such as news broadcasts and informational programs on Austrian radio and television.
- Level 2 - Victim– victimizer reversal. i.e. Statements with the content: ‘antisemitism is the Jews’ own fault’. Such remarks are packaged differently and occur in many contexts, especially in semi-public ones.
- Level 3 - All traditional antisemitic prejudices appear implicit or explicit. This requires either less formal contexts or especially well-known figures.
- Level 4 - Direct and open abuse of Jews. Such labels appeared only in anonymous settings.

Thus, a range and qualities of antisemitic discourse can be found in contemporary Austria, from silence to flagrant expressions of prejudice. The 'Jews' form the archetypal other while the antisemitic discourse forms the model for xenophobic, sexist, and other such discourses. The 'silence' relates to three different issues: first, the coding of antisemitic beliefs, as mentioned above, through implications and analogies; secondly, the silence of large sections of the Austrian elites when antisemitism is instrumentalized for political reasons; thirdly, the explicit denial through the justification discourses.

== See also ==
- History of the Jews in Austria
- Anti-Germans (political current)
- Timeline of antisemitism in the 21st century
- Antisemitism in 21st-century Germany
- Antisemitism in 21st-century France
- Antisemitism in 21st-century Italy
- Antisemitism in contemporary Belgium
- Antisemitism in contemporary Hungary
- Austria victim theory
- Israel–Austria relations
