= Nonna Mayer =

French political scientist

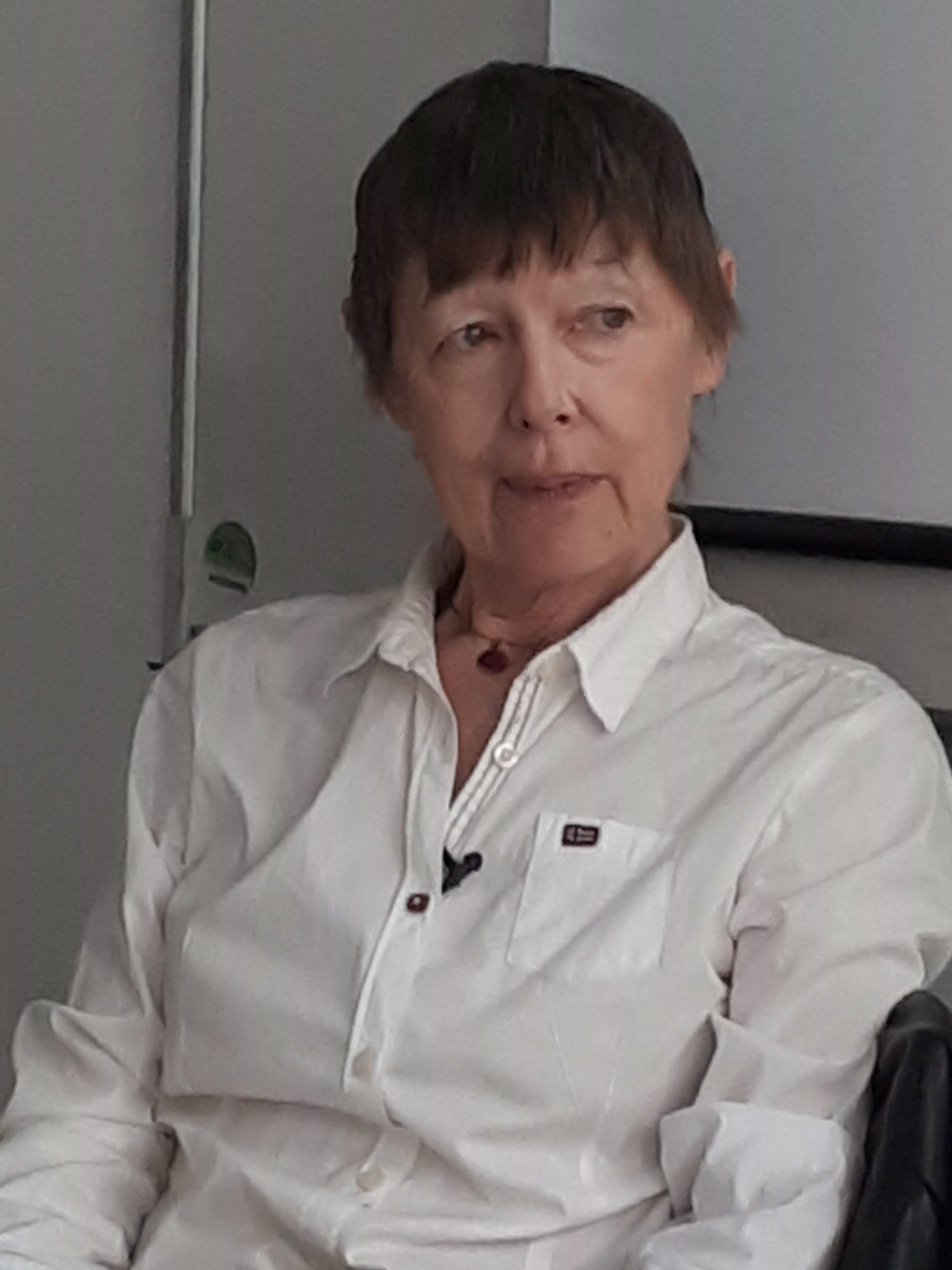
- Nonna Mayer in May 2019
- Education: Institut d'études politiques
- Scientific career
- Fields: Political science
- Workplaces: Sciences Po; French National Centre for Scientific Research

Nonna Mayer (born 25 March 1948) is an academic French political scientist and researcher in political science. She is a research director at the CNRS, and a specialist of electoral sociology and of far right movements in France. She was president of the Association Française de Science Politique from 2005 to 2016.

== Early life and education ==
Mayer was born on 25 March 1948 in Neuilly-sur-Seine.

She graduated from the Political and Social Section of the Paris Institut d'études politiques in 1971, and earned her doctorate in political science in 1983. Her dissertation was entitled Les classes moyennes indépendantes dans la vie politique: le cas des petits commerçants français.

== Career ==
Mayer is Research Director at the French National Centre for Scientific Research, affiliated with the Centre de Recherches Politiques at Sciences Po (fr), and she runs the political sociology program of the Paris Institute of Political Studies. She has also directed the Master of Advanced Studies in Political Sociology and Public Policy and the Masters in Comparative Societies and Politics there. She and Edmond Préteceille (fr) manage the Societies in Motion section of the Sciences Po Press.

In September 2005, Mayer was elected President of the French Political Science Association (fr).

Mayer has published numerous works on electoral politics. With Pascal Perrineau (fr), she co-directed a large group that studied the National Front. Her research focuses on electoral sociology, in particular that of the National Front and the French far right. She also studies associative activism, racism and anti-Semitism.

Mayer also participates in the Racism and Xenophobia European Network, and in the Group Focused Enmity comparative survey led by Wilhelm Heitmeyer. In February 2016, she was appointed member of the scientific council of the Inter-Ministerial Delegation to Combat Racism and Anti-Semitism, chaired by Dominique Schnapper.

Mayer, together with Olivier Dard (fr), Alexandre Dézé, Nicolas Lebourg and Jean-Claude Monod (fr), consulted with President François Hollande about the possibility of a victory by Marine Le Pen in the presidential election of 2017.
