= 2018 Berlin antisemitic attack =

Attack on a street in the German capital of Berlin

The 2018 Berlin antisemitic attack was an attack on a street in the German capital of Berlin. Two young men wearing Jewish skullcaps were insulted by Arabic-speaking passers-by. One of the two, an Arab Israeli citizen, was beaten with a belt by a Syrian attacker. Video footage led to public outrage.

== Background ==
A spokesman for the Jewish community said the attack showed that "Jewish people are not safe here".

The number of overall antisemitic offenses in Berlin had risen in prior years. In 2017, police had registered 288 antisemitic acts; in 2016, 197 antisemitic cases had been recorded. The Research and Information Center Antisemitism Berlin (RIAS) counts a total of 947 antisemitic incidents for 2017, but there may be unrecorded cases.

== Incident ==
On 17 April 2018, Adam Armoush, a 21-year-old Israeli Arab living in Berlin and his German friend of Moroccan origin went through a street in Prenzlauer Berg taking selfies while wearing kippot. According to Armoush, he was trying to win an argument with Jewish friends of his in Israel by proving that he could walk through Berlin wearing a Jewish skullcap. At one point, an argument with three Arab-speaking young men started, which was followed by a violent attack. Armoush managed to document the violence with his cell phone and later allowed the video to be shared on Facebook, where the video went viral. The video shows the main attacker, later identified as Knaan Al-S., a 19-year-old Syrian refugee, beat Armoush repeatedly with his belt. During the onslaught, the attacker shouted the word "Yahudi", the Arabic word for Jew, before one of his companions intervened and dragged him away. According to Armoush, the main attacker had also tried to hurt him with a glass bottle. As a consequence of the beating, Armoush suffered minor injuries. Before turning himself in to police, the main attacker contacted a representative of the Palestinian student community of Berlin and appeared in a short video that was distributed on social media. They denied he was hostile towards Jews or that his actions had been motivated by antisemitism.

== Legal proceedings ==
The main attacker turned himself in, accompanied by his lawyer, the day after the incident. An arrest warrant against him was executed. He was subsequently convicted and sentenced to four weeks in juvenile detention.

== Reactions ==
Several politicians, among them chancellor Angela Merkel and foreign minister Heiko Maas, condemned the attack. On the Israeli television, Merkel warned of persistent hatred of Jews in Germany. She spoke of a "different form of anti-Semitism" coming from people of Arab descent. After this and other incidents, the President of the Central Council of Jews in Germany, Josef Schuster, warned Jewish men "not to show themselves openly with a kippah in the metropolitan milieu in Germany".

Under the slogan "Berlin Wears Kippah" the Jewish community in Berlin called all citizens to wear the kippah on 25 April in solidarity with the victims.

== See also ==
- Antisemitism in 21st-century Germany
