= 2014 Sarcelles riots =

Civil unrest in France

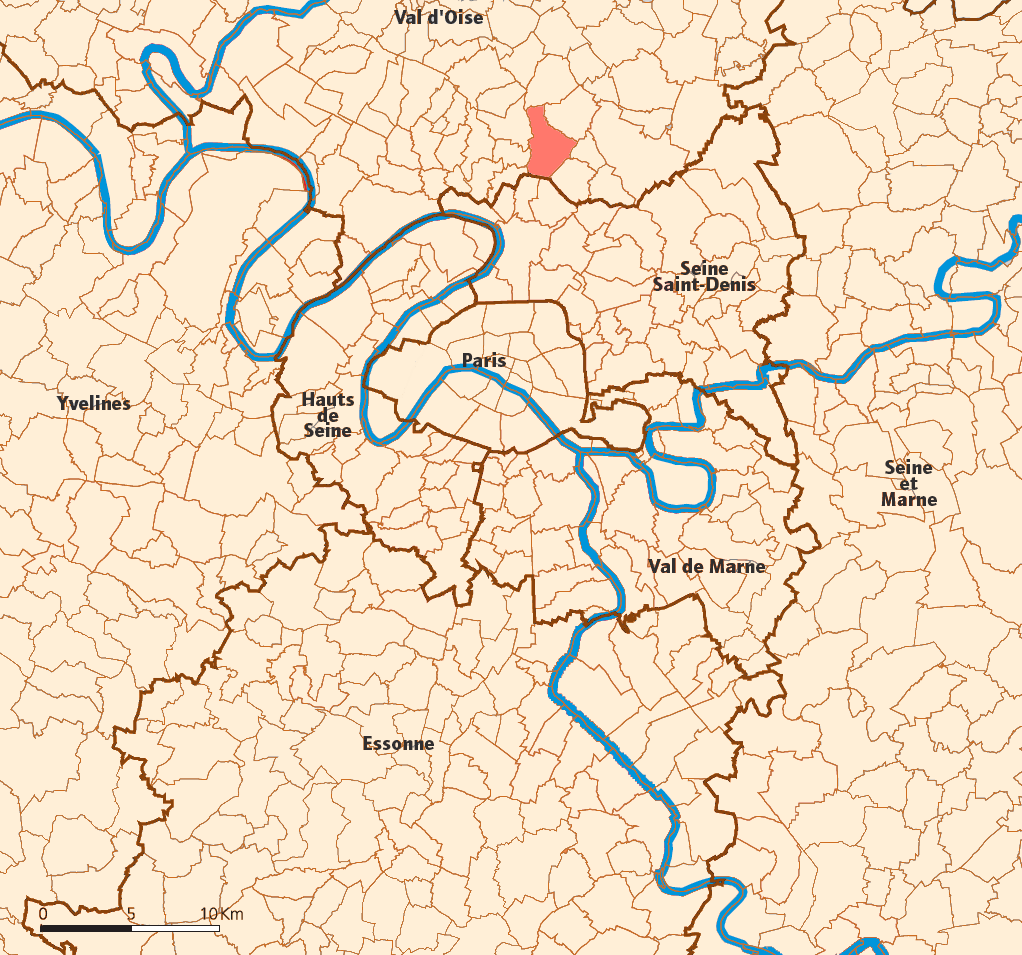
- Location: Sarcelles, France
- Date: July 20, 2014
- Target: Jewish-owned businesses and a synagogue
- Attack type: Riot
- Motive: Anger against Israeli actions in Gaza

On Sunday, 20 July 2014, a pro-Palestinian protest against the Israeli ground invasion of Gaza degenerated into a riot in Sarcelles, France. An illegal demonstration gathered about 500 persons (the police and organisers having similar figures), without incident, but the riots broke out after the dispersion of the demonstration, starting with 50 protesters provoking the police and eventually involving up 300 people according to the report of the riot police. Jewish-owned businesses and non-Jewish owned businesses were attacked and looted by local youths armed with metal bars and wooden clubs. Members of La Ligue de défense juive (LDJ, Jewish Defense League) were present in Sarcelles, and attempted to defend a synagogue by forming a line in front of it and holding motor-cycle helmets as weapons. Palestinian groups accused the League of provoking the attack by taunting demonstrators and throwing projectiles.

== Background ==
=== Pro-Palestinian demonstrations ===
The Operation Protective Edge created a lot of emotions in France, in particular within the French population of Arab descent. This social composition of the pro-Palestinian is both put forward by radical-left and post-colonial groups and by right-wing medias, and most of the events occurred in low-income and high-immigration neighbourhoods. The French government had been supportive of Israel, and almost all pro-Palestinian demonstrations had been banned. The interventions began around 14 July, initially presented as technical and due to the overlap with the festivities of the national holiday, Later interventions were justified as motivated by the clashes between pro-Palestinian and pro-Israel activists, which began as soon as 13 July. Illegal demonstrations took place in Barbès and Sarcelles. Those demonstrations were described as antisemitic by some commentators, and commentators pointed out the presence of Islamic or ethnic ("communautaristes") orientations inside those demonstrations, although they have mostly been organised by the radical left and the far-left (in particular the NPA). Some initial reports broadcast and then corrected afterwards as having been in error. There were oral reports of antisemitic sentences uttered during the demonstrations. In parallel, the pro-Israel counter-demonstration in Sarcelles was also forbidden, since groups such as Jewish Defense League had previously participated in several violent confrontations with pro-Palestinian demonstrators.

=== Claims of rising of antisemitism ===
France has the third largest community of Jews after Israel and the U.S. and antisemitism in France has increased significantly in recent years with one monitoring group claiming that it has increased 700% since the 1990s. Since the beginning of the 21st century, antisemitism in France has found new sources of recruitment from certain leftist groups and in the identification of a significant proportion of the Muslim immigrant population with the Palestinian cause on the one hand and with radical Islamism on the other. By early 2014 the number of French Jews immigrating to Israel had overtaken the number of American Jews and at the same time 70% of French Jews were concerned about insults or harassment and 60% about physical aggression because of their Jewishness, both figures being much higher than the European average.

A kosher grocery store was set ablaze, for which the perpetrator was convicted of arson.

== Reactions ==
=== Government response ===
Prime Minister of France Manuel Valls condemned the attack as antisemitic. He said of the attack, "What's happened in Sarcelles is intolerable: attacking a synagogue or a kosher grocery, is quite simply anti-Semitism, racism."

Minister of the Interior Bernard Cazeneuve said that the violence prompted the ban, not that the ban prompted the violence.

Three men, aged 21 and 28, were jailed for between six and ten months for their part in the riot. A fourth man received a suspended sentence, and a minor received a fine. Three other men received suspended sentences for their part in a riot in Paris on the same day. None of the convictions in Sarcelles were for 'anti-Semitism'. Instead they were for minor public order offences. The term 'riot' was never used by police or prosecutors.

== See also ==
- 2008–2009 Oslo riots
