= Timeline of antisemitism in the 21st century =

This timeline of antisemitism chronicles the facts of antisemitism, hostile actions or discrimination against Jews as a religious or ethnic group, in the 21st century. It includes events in the history of antisemitic thought, actions taken to combat or relieve the effects of antisemitism, and events that affected the prevalence of antisemitism in later years. The history of antisemitism can be traced from ancient times to the present day.

== 2000 ==
2000s
Craig Raine, in his books In Defence of T. S. Eliot (2001) and T. S. Eliot (2006), sought to defend Eliot from the charge of antisemitism. Reviewing the 2006 book, Paul Dean stated that he was not convinced by Raine's argument. Nevertheless, he concluded, "Ultimately, as both Raine and, to do him justice, Julius insist, however much Eliot may have been compromised as a person, as we all are in our several ways, his greatness as a poet remains." In another review of Raine's 2006 book, the literary critic Terry Eagleton also questioned the validity of Raine's defense of Eliot's character flaws as well as the entire basis for Raine's book, writing, "Why do critics feel a need to defend the authors they write on, like doting parents deaf to all criticism of their obnoxious children? Eliot's well-earned reputation [as a poet] is established beyond all doubt, and making him out to be as unflawed as the Archangel Gabriel does him no favours."
2000
Richard Baumhammers walked to the home of his next-door neighbor, a 63-year-old Jewish woman named Anita "Nicki" Gordon and fatally shot her, then set her house on fire. Some time after that, he drove to the Beth El Congregation in Scott Township, where Gordon was a member of the synagogue. There, he fired into the windows of the synagogue, then exited his vehicle and spray-painted two red swastikas on the building. Baumhammers later drove to the Ahavath Achim Congregation in Carnegie where he shattered the synagogue's glass windows with gunfire.
2000
In April 2000 the International League against Racism and Anti-Semitism and Union des étudiants juifs de France (the Union of French Jewish Students) brought a case against Yahoo! in which it objected to the auctioning of Nazi memorabilia, in France, via Yahoo!'s website on the basis that it contravened Article R645-1. Though a French judge initially ordered Yahoo! to take measures to make it impossible for users in France to purchase any Nazi memorabilia through the Yahoo! site, in December 2001, the US District Court for the Northern District of California ruled that Yahoo! would be shielded from the judgement of the French court.
2000
The Temple Beth El building, but not the sanctuary, was heavily damaged in an arson attack on 13 October 2000. Palestinian-American Ramsi Uthman was convicted in the attack. Ahed Shehadeh was convicted of aiding and abetting the arson. According to Shehadeh's testimony, after Uthman set fire to the Temple, he yelled "I did this for you, God!" In exchange for his testimony Shehadeh received a five-year prison sentence, and was released in 2008. Uthman received the maximum possible sentence of 25 years, to be served in New York's Attica Correctional Facility, although he will be eligible for parole in 2021. The building reopened in 2001 after repairing some $700,000 of damage from the attack.
2000
Firebombing of a New York synagogue (Conservative Synagogue Adath Israel of Riverdale), 2000 New York terror attack.
2000
The Canadian provinces of Alberta, Manitoba and Nova Scotia enacted legislation to recognize Holocaust Memorial Day in 2000.
2000 October 31
Beth Israel Synagogue (Edmonton) is firebombed.
2000
On 22 November 2000, Judge Edward R. Korman announced a settlement of the World Jewish Congress lawsuit against Swiss banks with his approval of a plan featuring the payment of $1.25 billion into funds controlled by the Israeli Banking Trust. Judah Gribetz was appointed Special Master to administer the plan, which is sometimes called the Gribetz Plan after its chief author.
2000
David Irving v Penguin Books and Deborah Lipstadt is a case in English law, decided in 2000, against American author Deborah Lipstadt and her publisher Penguin Books, filed in an English court by the British author David Irving in 1996, asserting that Lipstadt had libeled him in her book Denying the Holocaust. The court ruled that the Irving's claim of libel relating to English defamation law and Holocaust denial was not valid because his deliberate distortion of evidence has been shown to be substantially true. English libel law puts the burden of proof on the defence, meaning that it was up to Lipstadt and her publisher to prove that her claims of Irving's deliberate misrepresentation of evidence to conform to his ideological viewpoints were substantially true. Lipstadt hired British-Jewish lawyer Anthony Julius while Penguin hired libel experts Kevin Bays and Mark Bateman of media law firm Davenport Lyons. Richard J. Evans, an established historian, was hired by the defence to serve as an expert witness. Evans spent two years examining Irving's work, and presented evidence of Irving's misrepresentations, including evidence that Irving had knowingly used forged documents as source material. Upon mutual agreement, the case was argued as a bench trial before Mr. Justice Charles Gray, who produced a written judgment 333 pages long in favour of the defendants, in which he detailed Irving's systematic distortion of the historical record of World War II.
2000
During the 2000 Presidential election, Lee Alcorn, president of the Dallas NAACP branch, criticized Al Gore's selection of Senator Joe Lieberman for his Vice-Presidential candidate because Lieberman was Jewish. On a gospel talk radio show on station KHVN, Alcorn stated, "If we get a Jew person, then what I'm wondering is, I mean, what is this movement for, you know? Does it have anything to do with the failed peace talks?" ... "So I think we need to be very suspicious of any kind of partnerships between the Jews at that kind of level because we know that their interest primarily has to do with money and these kind of things."
NAACP President Kweisi Mfume immediately suspended Alcorn and condemned his remarks. Mfume stated, "I strongly condemn those remarks. I find them to be repulsive, anti-Semitic, anti-NAACP and anti-American. Mr. Alcorn does not speak for the NAACP, its board, its staff or its membership. We are proud of our long-standing relationship with the Jewish community and I personally will not tolerate statements that run counter to the history and beliefs of the NAACP in that regard."
Alcorn, who had been suspended three times in the previous five years for misconduct, subsequently resigned from the NAACP and started his own organization called the Coalition for the Advancement of Civil Rights. Alcorn criticized the NAACP, saying, "I can't support the leadership of the NAACP. Large amounts of money are being given to them by large corporations that I have a problem with." Alcorn also said, "I cannot be bought. For this reason I gladly offer my resignation and my membership to the NAACP because I cannot work under these constraints."
Alcorn's remarks were also condemned by the Reverend Jesse Jackson, Jewish groups and George W. Bush's rival Republican presidential campaign. Jackson said he strongly supported Lieberman's addition to the Democratic ticket, saying, "When we live our faith, we live under the law. He [Lieberman] is a firewall of exemplary behavior."
Al Sharpton, another prominent African-American leader, said, "The appointment of Mr. Lieberman was to be welcomed as a positive step." The leaders of the American Jewish Congress praised the NAACP for its quick response, stating that: "It will take more than one bigot like Alcorn to shake the sense of fellowship of American Jews with the NAACP and black America. ... Our common concerns are too urgent, our history too long, our connection too sturdy, to let anything like this disturb our relationship."

== 2001 ==
2001
During the World Conference against Racism 2001, in Durban, two delegations, the United States and Israel, withdraw from the conference due to their objections to a draft document equating Zionism with racism.
2001
Every year since 2001, there has been an annual national memorial to the victims of the Holocaust in the United Kingdom.
2001
In Belgium in 2001, Roeland Raes, the ideologue and vice-president of one of the country's largest political parties, the Vlaams Belang (formerly named Vlaams Blok, Flemish Bloc), gave an interview on Dutch TV where he cast doubt over the number of Jews murdered by the Nazis during the Holocaust. In the same interview he questioned the scale of the Nazis' use of gas chambers and the authenticity of Anne Frank's diary. In response to the media assault following the interview, Raes was forced to resign his position but vowed to remain active within the party. Three years later, the Vlaams Blok was convicted of racism and chose to disband. Immediately afterwards, it legally reformed under the new name Vlaams Belang (Flemish Interest) with the same leaders and the same membership.
2001
Slovakia criminalized denial of fascist crimes in general in late 2001; in May 2005, the term "Holocaust" was explicitly adopted by the penal code and in 2009, it became illegal to deny any act regarded by an international criminal court as genocide.
2001
Untersturmführer Julius Viel was convicted in 2001 of shooting seven Jewish prisoners from the Theresienstadt concentration camp in 1945.
2001 May 4
At the 17th meeting of the International Liaison Committee in New York City, Catholic Church officials state that they will change how Judaism is dealt with in Catholic seminaries and schools. In part, they state:

The curricula of Catholic seminaries and schools of theology should reflect the central importance of the Church's new understanding of its relationship to Jews....Courses on Bible, developments by which both the Church and rabbinic Judaism emerged from early Judaism will establish a substantial foundation for ameliorating "the painful ignorance of the history and traditions of Judaism of which only negative aspects and often caricature seem to form part of the stock ideas of many Christians". (See notes on the Correct Way to Present Jews and Judaism in Catholic Preaching and Catechesis, No. 27, 1985)

...Courses dealing with the biblical, historical and theological aspects of relations between Jews and Christians should be an integral part of the seminary and theologate curriculum, and not merely electives. All who graduate from Catholic seminaries and theology schools should have studied the revolution in Catholic teaching on Jews and Judaism from Nostra aetate to the prayer of Pope John Paul II in Jerusalem at the Western Wall on 26 March 2000....For historic reasons, many Jews find it difficult to overcome generational memories of anti-Semitic oppression. Therefore: Lay and Religious Jewish leaders need to advocate and promote a program of education in our Jewish schools and seminaries – about the history of Catholic-Jewish relations and knowledge of Christianity and its relationship to Judaism....Encouragement of dialogue between the two faiths does involve recognition, understanding and respect for each other's beliefs, without having to accept them. It is particularly important that Jewish schools teach about the Second Vatican Council, and subsequent documents and attitudinal changes that opened new perspectives and possibilities for both faiths.

== 2002 ==
2002
In a letter released in late 2002, Osama bin Laden stated that Jews controlled the civilian media outlets, politics, and economic institutions of the United States.
2002
In Romania, Emergency Ordinance No. 31 13 March 2002 prohibits Holocaust denial. It was ratified on 6 May 2006. The law also prohibits racist, fascist, xenophobic symbols, uniforms and gestures: proliferation of which is punishable with imprisonment from between six months to five years.
2002 March 11
Arson attack on Anshei Minsk Synagogue in Toronto, Ontario, Canada.
2002 March 30
2002 Lyon car attack takes place.
2002
During the Watergate affair, there were suggestions that Billy Graham had agreed with many of President Richard Nixon's antisemitic opinions, but he denied them and stressed his efforts to build bridges to the Jewish community. In 2002, the controversy was renewed when declassified "Richard Nixon tapes" confirmed remarks made by Graham to Nixon three decades earlier. Captured on the tapes, Graham agreed with Nixon that Jews control the American media, calling it a "stranglehold" during a 1972 conversation with Nixon, and suggesting that if Nixon was re-elected, they might be able to do something about it. When the tapes were made public, Graham apologized and said, "Although I have no memory of the occasion, I deeply regret comments I apparently made in an Oval Office conversation with President Nixon ... some 30 years ago. ... They do not reflect my views and I sincerely apologize for any offense caused by the remarks." According to Newsweek magazine, "[T]he shock of the revelation was magnified because of Graham's longtime support of Israel and his refusal to join in calls for conversion of the Jews."
2002
On 11 April, Ghriba synagogue bombing takes place in Tunisia.
2002
On 4 July 2002, a lone gunman opened fire at the airline ticket counter of El Al, Israel's national airline, at Los Angeles International Airport in Los Angeles, California. Two people were killed and four others were injured before the gunman was fatally shot by a security guard after also being wounded by him. This was the 2002 Los Angeles International Airport shooting.
2002
Pat Buchanan said

There was nothing immoral, or unwise, about the isolationists' position of 1940–41. Because of the courageous efforts of Lindbergh and America First, the United States stayed out of the war until Hitler threw the full force of his war machine against Stalin. Thus, the Soviet Union, not America's young, bore the brunt of defeating Nazi Germany.

2002
In an interview for the magazine Lyon Capitale in January 2002, comedian Dieudonné described "the Jews" as "a sect, a fraud, which is the worst of all, because it was the first" and said he preferred "the charisma of bin Laden to that of Bush".
2002
During a 2002 white supremacist terror plot, a pair of white supremacists planned to bomb a series of institutions and people associated with African American and American Jewish communities. Targets included the United States Holocaust Museum, the New England Holocaust Memorial; well-known Jews, including Steven Spielberg; and black leaders, including Rev. Jesse Jackson.
2002 May
Bomb detonated at a synagogue in Quebec City.
2002
Massive European wave of attacks on Jews and Jewish institutions between March and May, with largest number of attacks occurring in France.
2002
In January 2002, the Canadian Human Rights Tribunal delivered a ruling in a complaint involving Holocaust denier Ernst Zündel's website, in which it was found to be contravening the Canadian Human Rights Act. The court ordered Zündel to cease communicating hate messages.

== 2003 ==
2003
Bulgaria officially designates 10 March as Holocaust Remembrance Day and the "Day of the Salvation of the Bulgarian Jews and of the Victims of the Holocaust and of the Crimes against Humanity".
2003 May 16
2003 Casablanca bombings target multiple locations, including a Jewish community center.
2003
The Southern Baptist Convention passed a resolution "On Anti-Semitism" stating in part:
"RESOLVED, That the messengers to the Southern Baptist Convention meeting in Phoenix, Arizona, June 17–18, 2003, denounce all forms of anti-Semitism as contrary to the teachings of our Messiah and an assault on the revelation of Holy Scripture; and be it further
"RESOLVED, That we affirm to Jewish people around the world that we stand with them against any harassment that violates our historic commitments to religious liberty and human dignity; and be it finally
"RESOLVED, That we call on governmental and religious leaders across the world to stand against all forms of bigotry, hatred, or persecution."
2003
People for the Ethical Treatment of Animals's "Holocaust on your Plate" exhibition consisted of eight 60-square-foot (5.6 m^{2}) panels, each juxtaposing images of the Holocaust with images of factory-farmed animals. Photographs of concentration camp inmates were displayed next to photographs of battery chickens, and piled bodies of Holocaust victims next to a pile of pig carcasses. Captions alleged that "like the Jews murdered in concentration camps, animals are terrorized when they are housed in huge filthy warehouses and rounded up for shipment to slaughter. The leather sofa and handbag are the moral equivalent of the lampshades made from the skins of people killed in the death camps."
The exhibition was funded by an anonymous Jewish philanthropist, and created by Matt Prescott, who lost several relatives in the Holocaust. Prescott said: "The very same mindset that made the Holocaust possible – that we can do anything we want to those we decide are 'different or inferior' – is what allows us to commit atrocities against animals every single day. ... The fact is, all animals feel pain, fear and loneliness. We're asking people to recognize that what Jews and others went through in the Holocaust is what animals go through every day in factory farms."
However, Abraham Foxman, chairman of the Anti-Defamation League, said the exhibition was "outrageous, offensive and takes chutzpah to new heights ... The effort by PETA to compare the deliberate systematic murder of millions of Jews to the issue of animal rights is abhorrent." Stuart Bender, legal counsel for the United States Holocaust Memorial Museum, wrote to PETA asking them to "cease and desist this reprehensible misuse of Holocaust materials."
On 20 February 2009, the German Federal Constitutional Court dismissed a legal move challenging an appeal court's ruling that PETA's campaign was not protected by free speech laws. While not entering formal proceedings to decide in the matter, the court expressed severe doubts as to whether the campaign constituted an offense against human rights in its opinion to dismiss the appeal, as had been found by the orderly courts, but acceded to the other grounds of the former rulings that the campaign constituted a trivialization of the Holocaust and hence a severe violation of living Jews' personality rights. The subtleties of the ruling are sometimes not reflected adequately in press reports.
2003
On Yom Ha'atzmaut 2003, a Molotov cocktail was thrown through one of the synagogue Valley Beth Shalom's stained-glass windows.
2003 October 16
The Malaysian Prime Minister Dr. Mahathir Mohammed draws a standing ovation at the 57-member Organisation of the Islamic Conference for his speech. An excerpt: "[Muslims] are actually very strong. 1.3 billion people cannot be simply wiped out. The Nazis killed 6 million Jews out of 12 million. But today the Jews rule this world by proxy. They get others to fight and die for them. They invented socialism, communism, human rights and democracy so that persecuting them would appear to be wrong so they may enjoy equal rights with others. With these they have now gained control of the most powerful countries. And they, this tiny community, have become a world power."
2003 November 16
Neve Shalom Synagogue was hit by one of four car bomb attacks carried out in Istanbul that week (see 2003 Istanbul bombings).

== 2004 ==
2004
Romania officially denied the Holocaust occurred on its territory up until the Wiesel Commission in 2004.
2004
National Holocaust Memorial Day has been recognized in Greece since 2004.Greek: Εθνική Ημέρα Μνήμης Ολοκαυτώματος (Ethniki Imera Mnimis Olokaftomatos), since 2004.
2004
The film The Passion of The Christ was released in 2004. Before the film was even released, there were prominent criticisms of perceived antisemitic content in the film. 20th Century Fox told New York Assemblyman Dov Hikind they had passed on distributing the film in response to a protest outside the News Corporation building. Hikind warned other companies that "they should not distribute this film. This is unhealthy for Jews all over the world."
A joint committee of the Secretariat for Ecumenical and Inter-religious Affairs of the United States Conference of Catholic Bishops and the Department of Inter-religious Affairs of the Anti-Defamation League obtained a version of the script before it was released in theaters. They released a statement, calling it

one of the most troublesome texts, relative to anti-Semitic potential, that any of us had seen in twenty-five years. It must be emphasized that the main storyline presented Jesus as having been relentlessly pursued by an evil cabal of Jews, headed by the high priest Caiaphas, who finally blackmailed a weak-kneed Pilate into putting Jesus to death. This is precisely the storyline that fueled centuries of anti-Semitism within Christian societies. This is also a storyline rejected by the Roman Catholic Church at Vatican II in its document Nostra aetate, and by nearly all mainline Protestant churches in parallel documents. ... Unless this basic storyline has been altered by Mr. Gibson, a fringe Catholic who is building his own church in the Los Angeles area and who apparently accepts neither the teachings of Vatican II nor modern biblical scholarship, The Passion of the Christ retains a real potential for undermining the repudiation of classical Christian anti-Semitism by the churches in the last forty years.

The ADL itself also released a statement about the yet-to-be-released film:

For filmmakers to do justice to the biblical accounts of the passion, they must complement their artistic vision with sound scholarship, which includes knowledge of how the passion accounts have been used historically to disparage and attack Jews and Judaism. Absent such scholarly and theological understanding, productions such as The Passion could likely falsify history and fuel the animus of those who hate Jews.

Rabbi Daniel Lapin, the head of the Toward Tradition organization, criticized this statement, and said of Foxman, the head of the ADL, "what he is saying is that the only way to escape the wrath of Foxman is to repudiate your faith".
In The Nation, reviewer Katha Pollitt said: "Gibson has violated just about every precept of the United States Conference of Catholic Bishops own 1988 'Criteria' for the portrayal of Jews in dramatizations of the Passion (no bloodthirsty Jews, no rabble, no use of Scripture that reinforces negative stereotypes of Jews, etc.) [...] The priests have big noses and gnarly faces, lumpish bodies, yellow teeth; Herod Antipas and his court are a bizarre collection of oily-haired, epicene perverts. The 'good Jews' look like Italian movie stars (Italian sex symbol Monica Bellucci is Mary Magdalene); Mary, who would have been around 50 and appeared 70, could pass for a ripe 35." Jesuit priest Fr. William Fulco, S.J., of Loyola Marymount University—and the film's Hebrew dialogue translator—specifically disagreed with that assessment, and disagreed with concerns that the film accused the Jewish community of deicide.
One specific scene in the film perceived as an example of anti-Semitism was in the dialogue of Caiaphas, when he states "His blood [is] on us and on our children!", a quote historically interpreted by some as a curse taken upon by the Jewish people. Certain Jewish groups asked this be removed from the film. However, only the subtitles were removed; the original dialogue remains in the Hebrew soundtrack. When asked about this scene, Gibson said: "I wanted it in. My brother said I was wimping out if I didn't include it. But, man, if I included that in there, they'd be coming after me at my house. They'd come to kill me." In an interview with the Detroit Free Press, when asked about the scene, he said, "It's one little passage, and I believe it, but I don't and never have believed it refers to Jews, and implicates them in any sort of curse. It's directed at all of us, all men who were there, and all that came after. His blood is on us, and that's what Jesus wanted. But I finally had to admit that one of the reasons I felt strongly about keeping it, aside from the fact it's true, is that I didn't want to let someone else dictate what could or couldn't be said."

Additionally, the film's suggestion that the Temple's destruction was a direct result of the Jews' actions towards Jesus could also be interpreted as an offensive take on an event which Jewish tradition views as a tragedy, and which is still mourned by many Jews today on the fast day of Tisha B'Av.
Asked by Bill O'Reilly if his movie would "upset Jews", Gibson responded, "It's not meant to. I think it's meant to just tell the truth. I want to be as truthful as possible." In an interview in The Globe and Mail newspaper, he added: "If anyone has distorted Gospel passages to rationalize cruelty towards Jews or anyone, it's in defiance of repeated Papal condemnation. The Papacy has condemned racism in any form. ... Jesus died for the sins of all times, and I'll be the first on the line for culpability".
Conservative columnist Cal Thomas also disagreed with allegations of antisemitism, saying "To those in the Jewish community who worry that the film [...] might contain anti-Semitic elements, or encourage people to persecute Jews, fear not. The film does not indict Jews for the death of Jesus." Two Orthodox Jews, Rabbi Daniel Lapin and conservative talk-show host and author Michael Medved, also vocally rejected claims that the film is anti-Semitic. They have noted the film's many sympathetic portrayals of Jews: Simon of Cyrene (who helps Jesus carry the cross), Mary Magdalene, the Virgin Mary, St. Peter, St. John, Veronica (who wipes Jesus' face and offers him water) and several Jewish priests who protest Jesus' arrest (Nicodemus and Joseph of Arimathea) during Caiaphas' trial of Jesus.
Bob Smithouser of Plugged in Online believed that film was trying to convey the evils and sins of humanity rather than specifically targeting Jews, stating: "The anthropomorphic portrayal of Satan as a player in these events brilliantly pulls the proceedings into the supernatural realm—a fact that should have quelled the much-publicized cries of anti-Semitism since it shows a diabolical force at work beyond any political and religious agendas of the Jews and Romans."
Moreover, Senior Vatican officer Cardinal Darío Castrillón Hoyos, who has seen the film, addressed the matter so:

Anti-Semitism, like all forms of racism, distorts the truth in order to put a whole race of people in a bad light. This film does nothing of the sort. It draws out from the historical objectivity of the Gospel narratives sentiments of forgiveness, mercy, and reconciliation. It captures the subtleties and the horror of sin, as well as the gentle power of love and forgiveness, without making or insinuating blanket condemnations against one group. This film expressed the exact opposite, that learning from the example of Christ, there should never be any more violence against any other human being.

2004
The first National Day of Commemorating the Holocaust in Romania was held in 2004.
2004 April 4
United Talmud Torah school library is firebombed in Montreal, Quebec, Canada.
2004 May
Jewish organizations and leaders protest Estonia's erection of a statue commemorating Alfons Rebane, an Estonian SS volunteer accused of serving as "a Nazi executioner" who was "responsible for the slaughter of thousands of Jews and Russians between 1941 and 1945."
2004 June
A series of attacks on Jewish cemeteries in Wellington, New Zealand.
2004 September
The European Commission against Racism and Intolerance, a part of the Council of Europe, called on its member nations to "ensure that criminal law in the field of combating racism covers anti-Semitism" and to penalize intentional acts of public incitement to violence, hatred or discrimination, public insults and defamation, threats against a person or group, and the expression of antisemitic ideologies. It urged member nations to "prosecute people who deny, trivialize or justify the Holocaust". The report was drawn up in wake of a rise in attacks on Jews in Europe. The report said it was Europe's "duty to remember the past by remaining vigilant and actively opposing any manifestations of racism, xenophobia, anti-Semitism and intolerance... Anti-Semitism is not a phenomenon of the past and... the slogan 'never again' is as relevant today as it was 60 years ago."

== 2005 ==
2005
The European Union has recognized International Holocaust Remembrance Day since 2005.
2005
In 2005 the United States had a "moment of silence" on the 60th anniversary of the surrender of Nazi Germany.
2005
Dieudonné stated during a press conference in Algiers that the Central Council of French Jews CRIF (Conseil représentatif des institutions juives de France) was a "mafia" that had "total control over French policy exercise", called the commemoration of the Holocaust "memorial pornography" ("pornographie mémorielle"), and claimed that the "Zionists of the Centre National de la Cinématographie," which "control French cinema" prevented him from making a film about the slave trade. Dieudonné was also trying to appear as a spokesman for French blacks, but, after some initial sympathy, notably from the novelist Calixthe Beyala, the journalists Antoine Garnier and Claudy Siar, as well as the founding members of the Conseil représentatif des associations noires (CRAN), he increasingly met with their rejection.
2005
In 2005 the Egyptian Muslim Brotherhood leader, Mohammed Mahdi Akef, denounced what he called "the myth of the Holocaust" in defending Iranian president Mahmoud Ahmadinejad's denial of the Holocaust.
2005 September
Throughout the Polish election Radio Maryja continued to promote antisemitic views, including denial of the facts of the Jedwabne pogrom in 1941. Their support of right-wing conservative Law and Justice party is considered a major factor in their electoral victory.
2005
A group of 15 members of the State Duma of Russia demands that Judaism and Jewish organizations be banned from the country. In June, 500 prominent Russians demand that the state prosecutor investigate ancient Jewish texts as "anti-Russian" and ban Judaism. The investigation was launched, but halted among international outcry.
2005
The 2005 Los Angeles bomb plot was a 2005 effort by a group of ex-convicts calling themselves Jamiyyat Ul-Islam Is-Saheeh to bomb several military bases, a number of synagogues, and an Israeli consulate in California.
On 31 August 2005, Kevin James and three other men were indicted on terrorism charges related to conspiracy to attack military facilities in the Los Angeles area and of attempting to fund their campaign by robbing gas stations in Southern California over the previous three months. Kevin James, a Muslim convert, was accused of founding a radical Islamic group called J.I.S (Jam’iyyat Ul-Islam Is-Saheehجمعية الإسلام الصحيح, Arabic for "Assembly of Authentic Islam") from his cell in Folsom Prison in California, and of recruiting fellow inmates to join his mission to kill infidels.
2005
Prince Harry was photographed at Highgrove House at a "Colonial and Native" themed costume party wearing a Nazi German Afrika Korps uniform with a swastika armband. He later issued a public statement apologising for his behavior.
2005
International Holocaust Remembrance Day was designated by the United Nations General Assembly Resolution 60/7 on 1 November 2005 during the 42nd plenary session.
2005 December
Iranian president Mahmoud Ahmadinejad widens the hostility between Iran and Israel by denying the Holocaust during a speech in the Iranian city of Zahedan. He made the following comments on live television: "They have invented a myth that Jews were massacred and place this above God, religions and the prophets." Continuing, he suggested that if the Holocaust had occurred, that it was the responsibility of Europeans to offer up territory to Jews: "This is our proposal: give a part of your own land in Europe, the United States, Canada or Alaska to them [the Jews] so that the Jews can establish their country." See Mahmoud Ahmadinejad and Israel

== 2006 ==
2006, 11 January
Alexandr Koptsev stabbed nine people at Bolshaya Bronnaya Synagogue.
2006
On 11 December 2006, the Iranian state-sponsored "International Conference to Review the Global Vision of the Holocaust" opened to widespread condemnation. The conference, called for by and held at the behest of Ahmadinejad, was widely described as a "Holocaust denial conference" or a "meeting of Holocaust deniers", though Iran denied it was a Holocaust denial conference. A few months before it opened, the Iranian Foreign Ministry spokesman Hamid Reza Asefi stated: "The Holocaust is not a sacred issue that one can't touch. I have visited the Nazi camps in Eastern Europe. I think it is exaggerated."
2006
John Gudenus received a one-year suspended sentence for breaking the Verbotsgesetz, Austria's laws against denying or diminishing the Holocaust. Gudenus had suggested that it was necessary to verify the existence of gas chambers in Nazi Germany and later remarked that there had been gas chambers in Poland but not in Germany.
2006
In 2006, Mel Gibson was arrested for driving under the influence (DUI) while speeding in his vehicle with an open container of alcohol, which is illegal in much of the United States. According to the arrest report, Gibson exploded into an angry tirade when the arresting officer would not allow him to drive home. Gibson climaxed with the words, "Fucking Jews... the Jews are responsible for all the wars in the world. Are you a Jew?"
2006
In 2006, sixty of Arthur Butz's colleagues from the Department of Electrical Engineering and Computer Science faculty signed a censure describing Butz's Holocaust denial as "an affront to our humanity and our standards as scholars". The letter also called for Butz to "leave our Department and our University and stop trading on our reputation for academic excellence".
2006
The Netherlands rejected a draft law proposing a maximum sentence of one year on denial of genocidal acts in general, although specifically denying the Holocaust remains a criminal offense there.
2006
Dieudonné was sentenced to a penalty of €4,500 for defamation after having called a prominent Jewish television presenter a "secret donor of the child-murdering Israeli army".
2006 February
A French Jew, Ilan Halimi is kidnapped and tortured to death for 23 days in what Paris police have officially declared an antisemitic act. The event causes international outcry. On 9 May, the Helsinki Commission held a briefing titled "Tools for Combating Anti-Semitism: Police Training and Holocaust Education".
2006 February
In February 2006 David Irving was convicted in Austria, where Holocaust denial is illegal, for a speech he had made in 1989 in which he denied the existence of gas chambers at Auschwitz. Irving was aware of the outstanding arrest warrant, but chose to go to Austria anyway "to give a lecture to a far-right student fraternity". Although he pleaded guilty to the charge, Irving said he had been "mistaken", and had changed his opinions on the Holocaust. "I said that then, based on my knowledge at the time, but by 1991 when I came across the Eichmann papers, I wasn't saying that anymore and I wouldn't say that now. The Nazis did murder millions of Jews." Irving served 13 months of a 3-year sentence in an Austrian prison, including the period between his arrest and conviction, and was deported in early 2007.
2006 July
Naveed Afzal Haq kills Pamela Waechter and injures five others in the July 2006 Seattle Jewish Federation shooting.
2006 December
The International Conference to Review the Global Vision of the Holocaust was a two-day conference that opened on 11 December 2006 in Tehran, Iran; many saw it as a conference rife with antisemitism, anti-Zionism, and Holocaust denial.

== 2007 ==
2007
Elie Wiesel was attacked in a San Francisco hotel by 22-year-old Holocaust denier Eric Hunt in February 2007, but was not injured. Hunt was arrested the following month and charged with multiple offenses.
2007
In May 2007 Ekrem Ajanovic, a Bosniak MP in the Bosnian Parliament proposed a legislation on criminalizing the denial of Holocaust, genocide and crimes against humanity. This was the first time that somebody in Bosnia and Herzegovina's Parliament proposed such a legislation. Bosnian Serb MPs voted against this legislation and proposed that such an issue should be resolved within the Criminal Code of Bosnia and Herzegovina. Following this, on 6 May 2009 Bosniak MPs Adem Huskic, Ekrem Ajanovic and Remzija Kadric proposed to the BH parliament a change to the Criminal Code of Bosnia and Herzegovina where Holocaust, genocide and crimes against humanity denial would be criminalized. Bosnian Serb MPs have repeatedly been against such a legislation claiming that the law "would cause disagreement and even animosity" according to SNSD member Lazar Prodanovic.
2007
In October 2007, a tribunal declared Spain's Holocaust denial law unconstitutional.
2007
On 15 November 2007, an appellate court sentenced Dieudonné to a €5,000 fine because he had characterized "the Jews" as "slave traders" after being attacked in le Théâtre de la Main d'Or.
2007
In 2007 Italy rejected a Holocaust denial law proposing a prison sentence of up to four years.
2007
A Jewish professor, Elizabeth Midlarsky, had a swastika spraypainted on her office door in 2007.
2007
On 15 February 2007, Holocaust denier Ernst Zündel was convicted on 14 counts of incitement under Germany's Volksverhetzung law, which bans the incitement of hatred against a portion of the population, and given the maximum sentence of five years in prison.
2007
On 7 July 2007, the Vatican released Pope Benedict XVI's motu proprio entitled, Summorum Pontificum which permitted more widespread celebration of Mass according to the "Missal promulgated by Pope John XXIII in 1962". Jewish reactions to the motu proprio underlined their concern that the traditional formulation of the Good Friday prayer for the Jews, which Jews felt offensive, would be more broadly used.
In the form in which they appear in the 1962 Missal, the set of prayers in which that of the Jews is included are for: the Holy Church, the Supreme Pontiff; all orders and grades of the faithful (clergy and laity); public officials (added in 1955, replacing an older prayer for the Holy Roman Emperor, not used since the abdication of Francis II in 1806 but still printed in the Roman Missal); catechumens; the needs of the faithful; heretics and schismatics; the conversion of the Jews (without the word "perfidis"); the conversion of pagans.
In later editions of the Missal, the prayers are for: the Church; the Pope, the clergy and laity of the Church; those preparing for baptism; the unity of Christians, the Jewish people; those who do not believe in Christ; those who do not believe in God; all in public office; those in special need.
2007 August/September
Israeli authorities are shocked to find a neo-Nazi group of immigrants (from Russia) called Patrol 36 committing vandalism and voicing antisemitic rhetoric within Israel's borders. Some members had immigrated under the Law of Return. One of that group's members was a grandchild of a Holocaust survivor, and all were of Jewish descent. The group was violent against gays, Ethiopian Jews, haredi Jews, and drug addicts.
2007 and 2008
Pope Benedict XVI, via the document Summorum Pontificum, officially revives the Tridentine Mass, which contains a Good Friday prayer asking for the conversion of the Jews. This leads to criticism from Jewish leaders, charging that the prayer is antisemitic. The Vatican subsequently issues a statement condemning antisemitism, but is reluctant to remove the prayer. and Benedict visits the Park East Synagogue in an April 2008 visit to New York, which is apparently well-received, with the congregants and the Pope exchanging gifts with each other.

== 2008 ==
Jewish communities around the world are rocked by firebombings, assaults, and death threats during a spate of antisemitic incidents during the Gaza War.
2008
On 8 September 2009, the Harvard Crimson school paper ran a paid Holocaust denial ad from Bradley R Smith. It was quickly criticized and an apology was issued from the editor, claiming it was a mistake.
2008
The Southern Baptist Convention passed a resolution stating in part, "RESOLVED, That we join in prayer for the peace of Jerusalem (Psalm 122:6–7), calling upon world leaders to renounce the growing tide of anti-Semitism".
2008
On 26 June 2008, Dieudonné was sentenced in the highest judicial instance to a €7,000 fine for his characterization of Holocaust commemorations as "memorial pornography".
2008
26–29 November: 2008 Mumbai attacks. Nariman House also attacked.
2008
On 26 December 2008, at an event at the Parc de la Villette in Paris, Dieudonné awarded the Holocaust denier Robert Faurisson an "insolent outcast" prize [prix de l'infréquentabilité et de l'insolence]. The award was presented by one of Dieudonné's assistants, Jacky, dressed in a concentration camp uniform with a yellow badge. This caused a scandal and earned him his sixth court conviction to date.
2008
The universal permission given to priests by Pope Benedict XVI in 2007 to celebrate (privately and, under certain conditions, even publicly) the Tridentine Mass as printed in the 1962 Roman Missal was followed by complaints from Jewish groups and some Catholic leaders over what they perceived as a return to a supersessionist theology that they saw expressed in the 1960 Good Friday prayer for the Jews. In response to the complaints, Pope Benedict amended the Good Friday prayer. On 6 February 2008, the Vatican newspaper, L'Osservatore Romano, published a note of the Secretariat of State announcing that Pope Benedict XVI had amended the Good Friday prayer for the Jews contained in the 1962 Roman Missal, and decreeing that the amended text "be used, beginning from the current year, in all celebrations of the Liturgy of Good Friday according to the aforementioned Missale Romanum".
The new prayer reads as follows:
Let us also pray for the Jews: That our God and Lord may illuminate their hearts, that they acknowledge Jesus Christ is the Savior of all men. (Let us pray. Kneel. Rise.) Almighty and eternal God, who want that all men be saved and come to the recognition of the truth, propitiously grant that even as the fullness of the peoples enters Thy Church, all Israel be saved. Through Christ Our Lord. Amen.
Even the new formulation met with reservations from groups such as the Anti-Defamation League. They considered the removal of "blindness" and "immersion in darkness" with respect to the Jews an improvement over the original language in the Tridentine Mass, but saw no reason why the prayer in the rite as revised by Paul VI was not used instead.
2008 26–29 November
Mumbai, India: Nariman House, a Chabad Lubavitch Jewish centre in Colaba known as the Mumbai Chabad House, was taken over by two Pakistani terrorists and several residents were held hostage. The house was stormed by NSG commandos and, after a long battle, the two attackers were killed. Rabbi Gavriel Holtzberg and his wife Rivka, who was six months pregnant, were murdered with other hostages inside the house by the attackers. Indian forces found the body of six hostages inside the house.7

== 2009 ==
2009
Swedish television broadcast an interview recorded at the Society of St. Pius X's seminary in Zaitzkofen, Bavaria. During the interview, Richard Williamson expressed a belief that Nazi Germany did not use gas chambers during the Holocaust and that a total of between 200,000 and 300,000 Jews were killed. Based upon these statements, the Bishop was immediately charged with and convicted of Holocaust denial by a German court. The Holy See declared that Pope Benedict had been unaware of Williamson's views when he lifted the excommunication of four bishops including him, and that Williamson would remain suspended from his episcopal functions until he unequivocally and publicly distanced himself from his position on the Holocaust. In 2010 Williamson was convicted of incitement in a German court in relation to those views; the conviction was later vacated on appeal but then reinstated on retrial in early 2013. He appealed again, but his appeal was rejected.
2009
In August 2009, Hamas refused to allow Palestinian children to learn about the Holocaust, which it called "a lie invented by the Zionists" and referred to Holocaust education as a "war crime".
2009
On 27 February 2009, Dieudonné was ordered to pay 75,000 Canadian dollars in Montreal to singer and actor Patrick Bruel for defamatory statements. He had called Bruel a "liar" and an "Israeli soldier".
2009
On 26 March 2009, Dieudonné was fined €1,000 and ordered to pay €2,000 in damages for having defamed Elisabeth Schemla, a Jewish journalist who ran the now-defunct Proche-Orient.info website. He declared on 31 May 2005 that the website wanted to "eradicate Dieudonné from the audiovisual landscape" and had said of him that "he's an anti-Semite, he's the son of Hitler, he will exterminate everyone".
2009
On 27 October 2009, Dieudonné was sentenced to a fine of €10,000 for "public insult of people of Jewish faith or origin" related to his show with Robert Faurisson. Dieudonné appealed to the European Court of Human Rights, which rejected his case on 10 November 2015.
2009
On 29 January 2009, Dieudonné celebrated the 80th birthday of Holocaust denier Robert Faurisson in his theater, in the midst of a representative gathering of Holocaust deniers, right-wing radicals, and radical Shiites.
2009
Kevin Myers attracted criticism for a 2009 article for the Irish Independent in which he claims: "There was no holocaust (or Holocaust, as my computer software insists) and six million Jews were not murdered by the Third Reich. These two statements of mine are irrefutable truths". In the article, Myers criticises the 6-million figure – though he says "millions of Jews were murdered" – and criticises the term holocaust because "[m]ost Jewish victims of the Third Reich were not burnt in the ovens in Auschwitz. They were shot by the hundreds of thousands in the Lebensraum of the east, or were worked or starved to death in a hundred other camps, across the Reich." Overall, he states: "I'm a holocaust denier; but I also believe that the Nazis planned the extermination of the Jewish people, as far as their evil hands could reach."
2009
Tapes were released in which Billy Graham is heard in a 1973 conversation with Richard Nixon referring to Jews and "the synagogue of Satan". A spokesman for Graham said that Graham has never been an antisemite and that the comparison (in accord with the context of the quotation in the Book of Revelation) was directed specifically at those claiming to be Jews, but not holding to traditional Jewish values.
2009
In a 14 April 2009, column, Pat Buchanan likened the persecution of John Demjanjuk to that of Jesus Christ on Calvary Hill, stating: "It is the same Satanic brew of hate and revenge that drove another innocent Man up Calvary that first Good Friday 2,000 years ago."
2009 April
Members of the Lithuanian Jewish community report significant increases in antisemitism. Local Jewish leader Simonas Aperavicius notes anti-Semitism in the Lithuanian media.
2009 May
On 20 May 2009, US law enforcement arrested four men in connection with a plot to shoot down military airplanes flying out of an Air National Guard base in Newburgh, New York, and blow up two synagogues in the Riverdale community of the Bronx. The group, led by James Cromitie, was tried and all four were convicted. It was later brought to light that the four men were actually encouraged into participating in the plot by the FBI. The men argue that this was a case of entrapment. See 2009 Bronx terrorism plot.
2009 June
A lone 88-year-old gunman and Neo-Nazi, James von Brunn enters the United States Holocaust Memorial Museum in Washington, D.C., shooting and fatally wounding Stephen Tyrone Johns, a security officer of African-American descent. See: United States Holocaust Memorial Museum shooting

== 2010 ==
2010, 5 January
Etz Hayyim Synagogue was targeted for an arson attack.
2010, 21 February
Sha'ar Hashamayim Synagogue (Cairo) bombed, no casualties.
2010, 23 July
Malmö Synagogue in Sweden is attacked with explosives. The explosion was caused with some kind of fireworks or firecracker containing too little gunpowder to seriously damage the building.
2010
In 2010 the Parliament of Hungary adopted legislation punishing the denial of the genocides committed by National Socialist or Communist systems, without mentioning the word "Holocaust".
2010
On 8 June 2010, Dieudonné was sentenced to a fine of €10,000 for defamation towards the International League against Racism and Anti-Semitism, which he had called "a mafia-like association that organizes censorship".

== 2011 ==
2011, 15 January
Congregation Dorshei Emet was one of six Jewish institutions in Montreal that were attacked by vandals on the night of 15 January 2011. The other buildings, all in Côte Saint-Luc, consisted of four synagogues and a school.
2011
In 2011, the first man was charged with Holocaust denial in Budapest. The Court sentenced the man to 18 months in prison, suspended for three years, and probation. He also had to visit either Budapest's memorial museum, Auschwitz or Yad Vashem in Jerusalem. He chose his local Holocaust Memorial Center and had to make three visits in total and record his observations.
2011
In 2011, J. Z. Knight stated, among other things, "Fuck God's chosen people! I think they have earned enough cash to have paid their way out of the goddamned gas chambers by now."
2011
The 2011 Manhattan terrorism plot was a conspiracy by two Muslim Arab-Americans to bomb various targets in the Manhattan borough of New York City, USA. They had planned to attack an unspecified synagogue and one of them expressed interest in blowing up a church and the Empire State Building. New York City law enforcement arrested the two suspects, 26-year-old Ahmed Ferhani and 20-year-old Mohamed Mamdouh, in a sting operation on 11 May 2011. Their plot was motivated primarily by "hatred of infidels and anti-semitism" according to the authorities.
2011
After the town of Wunsiedel became the scene of pilgrimages and neo-Nazi demonstrations every August on the date of Rudolf Hess's death, the parish council decided not to allow an extension on the grave site's lease when it expired in 2011. With the eventual consent of his family, Hess's grave was re-opened on 20 July 2011 and his remains were exhumed, and then cremated. His ashes were scattered at sea by family members; the gravestone, which bore the epitaph "Ich hab's gewagt" ("I have dared"), was destroyed.

== 2012 ==
January 2012
Two New Jersey teenagers conduct a crime spree targeting Jewish institutions, culminating in the firebombing of Congregation Beth-El in Rutherford, New Jersey on January 11. The activities started two months prior.
2012 March
Mohammed Merah, a 23-year-old Algerian Muslim kills four Jews (including three children) outside a school in Toulouse, France.
2012
Jew Pond, a small body of water in Mont Vernon, New Hampshire, is officially renamed Carleton Pond.
2012
Section 335 of the Act C of 2012 on the Criminal Code of Hungary regulates the "use of symbols of totalitarianism", including the swastika, the insignia of the SS, the arrow cross, the hammer and sickle, and the five-pointed red star.
2012
In February 2012, a member of the Church of Jesus Christ of Latter-day Saints performed a posthumous baptism for Simon Wiesenthal's parents without proper authorization. After his own name was submitted for proxy baptism, Elie Wiesel spoke out against the unauthorized practice of posthumously baptizing Jews and asked presidential candidate and Latter-day Saint Mitt Romney to denounce it. Romney's campaign declined to comment, directing such questions to church officials.
2012, 28 September
Malmö Synagogue in Sweden is attacked with an explosive device on 28 September 2012, shattering a window.

== 2013 ==
2013
In an interview with CNN, newly elected Iranian President Hassan Rouhani was quoted as condemning the Holocaust, stating, "I can tell you that any crime that happens in history against humanity, including the crime the Nazis created towards the Jews as well as non-Jews is reprehensible and condemnable. Whatever criminality they committed against the Jews, we condemn." Iranian media later accused CNN of fabricating Rouhani's comments.
2013
Alice Walker expressed appreciation for the works of the conspiracy theorist David Icke. On BBC Radio 4's Desert Island Discs, she said that Icke's book Human Race Get Off Your Knees would be her choice if she could have only one book. The book promotes the theory that the Earth is ruled by shapeshifting reptilian humanoids and "Rothschild Zionists." Jonathan Kay of the National Post described the book as "hateful, hallucinogenic nonsense." He wrote that Walker's public praise for Icke's book was "stunningly offensive" and that by taking it seriously, she was disqualifying herself "from the mainstream marketplace of ideas."
2013
In December, while performing onstage, Dieudonné was recorded saying about prominent French Jewish radio journalist Patrick Cohen: "Me, you see, when I hear Patrick Cohen speak, I think to myself: 'Gas chambers ... too bad.'"
2013
On 31 December, Dieudonné released a 15-minute video proposing that "2014 will be the year of the quenelle!". In it, Dieudonné attacks "bankers" and "slavers", so as not to say "Jews" and end up in a lawsuit, and calls upon his followers, "quenelleurs"—those who listen and follow him—towards a hatred of Jews.
2013
Louis Farrakhan made antisemitic comments during his 16–17 May 2013 visit to Detroit and in his weekly sermons titled "The Time and What Must Be Done", begun during January 2013.
2013
In his official 2013 Nowruz address, Supreme Leader of Iran Grand Ayatollah Ali Khamenei questioned the veracity of the Holocaust, remarking that "The Holocaust is an event whose reality is uncertain and if it has happened, it's uncertain how it has happened." This was consistent with Khamenei's previous comments regarding the holocaust.

== 2014 ==
2014
On 6 January, France's interior minister Manuel Valls said that performances considered antisemitic may be banned by local officials. Within hours, Bordeaux became the first French city to ban Dieudonné when mayor Alain Juppé canceled a local appearance planned as part of a scheduled national tour, followed closely by Nantes, Tours, Orleans, Toulouse, Limoges, and Biarritz. The show in Switzerland will go on as scheduled, while other cities are still studying the situation. The Paris Prefect of Police on 10 January prohibited Dieudonné from staging his next three upcoming shows at his Paris theatre. In February, Dieudonné was banned from entry in the United Kingdom.
2014 April 13
Antisemitic Ku Klux Klan leader Frazier Glenn Cross, also known as Frazier Glenn Miller, kills three non-Jewish people at a Jewish community center and a Jewish retirement in home in Overland Park, Kansas, the day before the start of Passover.
2014 May
Residents of a village in Spain called Castrillo Matajudíos ("Jew-killer Camp") since 1627 vote to change the name of the village to the older name Castrillo Mota de Judíos ("Hill of Jews Camp"). The name is changed in June 2015.

== 2015 ==
2015
The Mayors United Against Antisemitism initiative was developed by the American Jewish Committee in July 2015 and launched in Europe later in 2015.
2015
The Porte de Vincennes siege occurred at a Hypercacher kosher superette in Porte de Vincennes (20th arrondissement of Paris) in the wake of the Charlie Hebdo shooting two days earlier, and concurrently with the Dammartin-en-Goële hostage crisis in which the two Charlie Hebdo gunmen were cornered.
Amedy Coulibaly had pledged allegiance to the Islamic State of Iraq and the Levant, and was a close friend of Saïd Kouachi and Chérif Kouachi (whom he had met in jail in 2005), the gunmen in the Charlie Hebdo attack. Armed with a submachine gun, an assault rifle, and two Tokarev pistols, he entered and attacked the people in the kosher food superette. He had a female accomplice, speculated to be his wife, Hayat Boumeddiene. Coulibaly murdered four Jewish hostages, and held fifteen other hostages during a siege in which he demanded that the Kouachi brothers not be harmed. The police ended the siege by storming the store and killing Coulibaly.
2015
On 10 January 2015, following the Charlie Hebdo shooting, the Porte de Vincennes siege of a kosher supermarket, and the 1,500,000-strong "march against hatred" in Paris, Dieudonné wrote on Facebook "As far as I am concerned, I feel I am Charlie Coulibaly." In this way he mixed the popular slogan "Je suis Charlie", used to support the journalists killed at the Charlie Hebdo magazine, with a reference to Amedy Coulibaly who was responsible for the hostage-taking at the kosher supermarket which included the killing of four Jews. On 13 January, Dieudonné was arrested in Paris, accused of publicly supporting terrorism, based on his earlier Facebook comments where he appeared to support the kosher supermarket gunman Amedy Coulibaly. Dieudonné's arrest over his "Je suis Charlie Coulibaly" comments sparked discussion over a perceived hypocrisy concerning freedom of speech, contrasting his bans and arrest, with the freedom for Charlie Hebdo to publish controversial cartoons of Muhammad.
2015 February 3
2015 Nice stabbing three soldiers, guarding a Jewish community center in Nice, France, were attacked with a knife by Moussa Coulibaly, a lone-wolf terrorist.
2015
In 2015, the House of Cartoon and the Sarcheshmeh Cultural Complex in Iran organized the International Holocaust Cartoon Competition, a competition in which artists were encouraged to submit cartoons on the theme of Holocaust denial. Hamshahri, a popular Iranian newspaper, held a similar contest in 2006.
2015
Within hours of his being announced as Jon Stewart's successor, attention was drawn on the Internet to several jokes that Trevor Noah had made through his Twitter account, which were criticized as being offensive to women and Jews, and to be making fun of the Holocaust. Noah responded by tweeting, "To reduce my views to a handful of jokes that didn't land is not a true reflection of my character, nor my evolution as a comedian." Comedy Central stood behind Noah, saying in a statement, "Like many comedians, Trevor Noah pushes boundaries; he is provocative and spares no one, himself included... To judge him or his comedy based on a handful of jokes is unfair. Trevor is a talented comedian with a bright future at Comedy Central." Mary Kluk, chairperson of the South African Jewish Board of Deputies (SAJBD), said that the jokes were not signs of anti-Jewish prejudice and that they were part of Noah's style of comedy.
2015
In March 2015, Louis Farrakhan accused Jews of involvement in the September 11 attacks.
2015
In June 2015 Laurent Louis got a suspended 6-month sentence for breaking the 1995 Belgian law against Holocaust denial and lost his right to run for office in the next six years. He filed an appeal. Louis was ordered by the Belgian court of appeal in 2017, in lieu of a sentence and fine, to visit one Nazi concentration camp a year for the next five years.
January 2015
In January 2015, the Hungarian court ordered far-right on-line newspaper Kuruc.info to delete its article denying the Holocaust published in July 2013, which was the first ruling in Hungary of its kind. The Association for Civil Liberties (TASZ) offered free legal aid to the website as a protest against restrictions on freedom of speech, but the site refused citing the liberal views of the association, and also refused to delete the article.
January 2015
Spray-painted swastikas were drawn on the outside wall of a Jewish fraternity at U.C. Davis, on the 70th anniversary of the liberation of Auschwitz from the Nazis.
January 2015
La Mort aux Juifs was a hamlet under the jurisdiction of the French commune of Courtemaux in the Loiret department in north-central France. Its name has been translated as "Death to Jews" or "The death of the Jews". Under pressure from the national authorities, the municipal council retired the name in January 2015. A similar request about the name had been denied in 1992. The area is now split between the nearby hamlets of Les Croisilles and La Dogetterie.
2015 January 10
French terrorist Amedy Coulibaly takes hostages in a kosher supermarket in Paris in the course of the Charlie Hebdo shooting. He claims in the media that he wanted to kill Jews.
2015 February 14–15
2015 Copenhagen shootings
2015 February 16
Israel's PM Benjamin Netanyahu causes outrage by calling for a massive immigration of Jewish people from Europe to Israel saying "we say to the Jews, to our brothers and sisters, Israel is your home and that of every Jew." French PM Manuel Valls replied by saying "the place for French Jews is France."
2015 March
Stanford University student senate candidate Molly Horwitz was asked by a student group how her Jewish faith would affect her decision-making.
2015 August
Two Jewish synagogues and a Jewish neighborhood on the North Side of San Antonio, Texas, are vandalized with antisemitic graffiti.
2015 October
The Catholic Church in Poland publishes a letter referring to antisemitism as a sin against the commandment to love one's neighbor. The letter also acknowledged the heroism of those Poles who risked their lives to shelter Jews as Nazi Germany carried out the Holocaust in occupied Poland. The bishops who signed the letter cited the Polish Pope John Paul II who was opposed to antisemitism, and believed in founding Catholic-Jewish relations.
2015 October
Facebook has been accused of being a public platform used to incite terrorism. In October 2015, 20,000 Israelis claimed that Facebook was ignoring Palestinian incitement on its platform and filed a class-action suit demanding that Facebook remove all posts "containing incitement to murder Jews".
2015 December
The Vatican releases a 10,000-word document that, among other things, states that Jews do not need to be converted to find salvation, and that Catholics should work with Jews to fight antisemitism.
2015 December
The United Nations officially recognizes Yom Kippur, stating that from then on no official meetings will take place on the day. As well, the United Nations states that, beginning in 2016, they will have nine official holidays and seven floating holidays which each employee will be able to choose one of. It stated that the floating holidays will be Yom Kippur, Day of Vesak, Diwali, Gurpurab, Orthodox Christmas, Orthodox Good Friday, and Presidents' Day. This is the first time the United Nations officially recognizes any Jewish holiday.

== 2016 ==
2016
Natasha Waldorf of Alameda, who was Jewish, was subjected to two boys sending her text messages that included the word "kike" and other anti-Semitic insults, and the picture of product mascot Mr. Clean in a Nazi uniform called "Mr. Ethnic Cleansing." Two other students joked about the Holocaust and, when she confronted them, told her that "Hitler should have finished the job."
2016
Amidst an ongoing controversy in the Labour Party about antisemitism, Naz Shah was discovered by blogger Paul Staines in April 2016 to have reposted a Facebook meme in August 2014 supporting the relocation of Israel to the USA. Shah also commented on the post, suggesting the plan might "save them some pocket money". In July 2014, she wrote on Facebook about a newspaper poll concerning alleged Israeli war crimes in the Gaza conflict that "The Jews are rallying to the poll" and in September appeared to compare Israeli policies to those of Adolf Hitler. Shah asserted that her views on Israel had moderated in the 20 months since the post and on 26 April 2016 she resigned from her unpaid post as John McDonnell's PPS while still holding her seat on the Home Affairs Select Committee investigating the rise of antisemitism in the UK. She was suspended by the Labour Party on 27 April 2016, forfeiting all roles.
2016
In April 2016, Ken Livingstone commented publicly on the suspension of Labour MP Naz Shah; she had been removed from the party after it was revealed that she had made comments on Facebook suggesting that Israeli Jews should be relocated to the United States. Livingstone stated that Shah's postings, which were made before she became an MP at the 2015 general election, were "completely over the top" and "rude", although he did not deem them antisemitic. He asserted that there is a "well-orchestrated campaign by the Israel lobby to smear anybody who criticises Israeli policy as antisemitic", and also stated that Adolf Hitler "was supporting Zionism before he went mad and ended up killing six million Jews".
He defended his claims by reference to Lenni Brenner's Zionism in the Age of the Dictators, and many commentators suggested that Livingstone was referring to the Haavara Agreement between Nazi Germany and the Zionist Federation of Germany. Livingstone's statements were criticised by historians, among them Roger Moorhouse, who said that they were historically inaccurate. He also became involved in a public argument on the subject with the Labour MP John Mann.
Livingstone was subsequently suspended from Labour Party membership "for bringing the party into disrepute". Over 20 Labour MPs called for Livingstone's suspension, while Jon Lansman, founder of the pro-Corbyn Momentum group, called for Livingstone to leave politics altogether, and Khan called for his expulsion from the party. In a subsequent interview, Livingstone expressed regret both for mentioning Hitler and for offending Jews but added that "I'm not going to apologise for telling the truth." Corbyn announced that the decision to expel Livingstone would be made by a National Executive Committee internal inquiry, while Livingstone insisted that he would be exonerated on the basis of Brenner's book, saying "how can the truth be an offence?" Following this controversy, Livingstone has questioned whether or not he has Jewish ancestry on his mother's side stating that Greville Janner used to speculate whether or not he was Jewish because "my grandmother's name was Zona."
Livingstone was sacked in Spring 2016 by LBC. He was quoted by The Daily Telegraph as saying this was because of his comments about Hitler.
2016
The U.C. Board of Regents approved a set of Principles Against Intolerance, which condemns "anti-Semitism" and which, in an opening contextual statement, includes "anti-Semitic forms of anti-Zionism" as something that has "no place at the University of California." The principles, passed unanimously at a 23 March board meeting in San Francisco, apply to students and faculty at all 10 U.C. campuses, though the document includes no enforcement mechanism or consequences for violations.
2016
An ethics rule of the American Bar Association now forbids comments or actions that single out someone on the basis of religion, as well as other factors.
2016
Richard B. Spencer and his organization drew considerable media attention in the weeks following the 2016 presidential election, where, in response to his cry "Hail Trump, hail our people, hail victory!", a number of his supporters gave the Nazi salute similar to the Sieg heil chant used at the Nazis' mass rallies. Spencer has defended their conduct, stating that the Nazi salute was given in a spirit of "irony and exuberance".
2016
The campus chapter of Students for Justice in Palestine at the University of California, Irvine was sanctioned because they disrupted a program hosted by a Jewish campus group in May and intimidated Jewish students.
2016
Ted Nugent posted an image on his Facebook page implying that Jews were responsible for gun control. Nugent's antisemitic rant sparked outrage and gun owners called for his NRA resignation.
2016
The nations that make up the Organization for Security and Cooperation in Europe began a three-year initiative to promote awareness and learning about anti-Semitism and to help the security of Jewish communities.
2016
On 13 November 2016, Steve Bannon, formerly the executive chair of Breitbart News, was appointed chief strategist and senior counselor to President-elect Donald Trump. This appointment drew opposition from the Anti-Defamation League, the Council on American–Islamic Relations, the Southern Poverty Law Center, Democrat Senate Minority Leader Harry Reid, and some Republican strategists, because of statements in Breitbart News that were alleged to be racist or anti-Semitic. Ben Shapiro, Bernard Marcus of the Republican Jewish Coalition, Morton Klein and the Zionist Organization of America, Pamela Geller, Shmuley Boteach, and David Horowitz defended Bannon against the allegations of antisemitism. Alan Dershowitz first defended Bannon and said there was no evidence he was antisemitic, but in a later piece stated that Bannon and Breitbart had made bigoted statements against Muslims, women, and others. The ADL said "we are not aware of any anti-Semitic statements from Bannon", while adding "under his stewardship, Breitbart has emerged as the leading source for the extreme views of a vocal minority who peddle bigotry and promote hate."
2016
In December 2016, the neo-Nazi and white supremacist website The Daily Stormer published a list of six local Jews in Whitefish, Montana along with their personal information, claiming that they were harming the business of Richard Spencer's mother and asking readers to "take action" against them. Whitefish police increased local patrols, and monitored Internet activity; Montana politicians and community groups responded with various efforts to focus attention on the question of antisemitism. On 28 December 2016, Spencer indicated that he did not want to bring ongoing national attention to Whitefish with his political views, and an offer was made to call off a proposed armed march against Jews, Jewish businesses and people who support either in the town. The march was postponed because the proper permitting materials were not submitted and the required fee was not paid.

== 2017 ==
2017
The court of appeal of Liège confirmed a first instance sentence of two months of jail time and a 9.000 euros fine for Dieudonné's anti-Semitic remarks in a performance on Herstal on 14 March 2012.
2017
In 2017, Alice Walker published a poem on her blog entitled "It Is Our (Frightful) Duty to Study the Talmud", recommending that the reader should start with YouTube to learn about the evils of the Talmud.
2017
With the beginning of the year, a wave of threats, including bomb threats, were made against Jewish Community Centers and other Jewish institutions in the United States. Juan M. Thompson, an African American former journalist for The Intercept, was arrested and charged with making at least eight of the hoax threats, as well as a threat made against the Anti-Defamation League, while allegedly impersonating a former girlfriend. Another suspect, an unidentified 19-year-old Israeli-American man, was arrested in Ashkelon, Israel and charged with responsibility for "dozens" of the threats.
2017
Murder of Sarah Halimi in Paris on 4 April 2017. The murderer was Kobili Traoré, a Muslim migrant from Mali who cried "Allahu Abkar" during the attack, who was found not responsible for his actions due to a "psychotic episode".
2017
Sebastian Gorka appeared on Fox News on the evening of the U.S. presidential inauguration wearing a badge, tunic, and ring associated with Order of Vitéz. According to some sources, Gorka was a member of the Order of Vitéz by inheritance, a group the US State Department lists as a Nazi-linked group. This has given rise to claims that Gorka himself carries sympathy for the Nazis. His father, Paul Gorka, was never a member of this Order and received a "Vitéz" (literally: "Valiant") medal from Hungarian exiles "for his resistance to dictatorship" in 1979. Gorka himself stated that he wears this medal in remembrance of his father, who was awarded the decoration for his efforts to create an anti-Communist, pro-democracy organization at the university he attended in Hungary. Robert Kerepeszki, Hungarian expert of the Order of Vitéz, has confirmed that there were ruptures in the organization of the Order of Vitéz on the question of Nazism during the war, many of them died fighting against Hungarian Nazis, and Gorka's medal had nothing to do with the war period, but was awarded "for his resistance to dictatorship."
2017
Leaders of one of two successor organisations of the Vitézi Rend stated that Sebastian Gorka was an official member of the Historical Vitézi Rend faction, to which he is said to have taken a lifelong oath of loyalty. Gorka denied the allegations. The Anne Frank Center for Mutual Respect, the National Jewish Democratic Council, and the Interfaith Alliance have called for Gorka's resignation over his ties to Hungarian far-right groups. The Anti-Defamation League has asked Gorka to disavow the Hungarian far-right groups that he has been associated with. Democratic Senators Ben Cardin, Dick Durbin and Richard Blumenthal sent a letter to the Department of Justice and the Department of Homeland Security requesting that the DHS look into whether Gorka "illegally procured his citizenship" by omitting membership in Historical Vitézi Rend, which could have been grounds for keeping him out of the country.
2017
Chicago Dyke March organizers singled out and approached a group of women carrying Jewish pride flags and began questioning them on their political stance in regards to Zionism and Israel, and then after a discussion asked them to leave the event, insisting that their presence "made people feel unsafe". The organizers attributed the responses of the women and the white star of David, featured at the center of the rainbow flag as a "zionist expression". This prompted widespread accusations of antisemitism.
2017
In the early morning hours of 28 June 2017, one of the 9 feet (2.7 m) glass panels on the New England Holocaust Memorial was smashed with a rock.
2017
In Ukraine, some men vandalized the Space of Synagogues [Holocaust] memorial display; they wrote neo-Nazi slogans and the English words "white power", and drew a swastika and ultranationalist Ukrainian symbols.
2017
Viktor Orbán, Prime Minister of Hungary, made a speech in which he called Miklós Horthy an "exceptional statesman" and gave him the credit for the survival of Hungary. The U.S. Holocaust Museum then issued a statement denouncing Orbán and the Hungarian government for trying to "rehabilitate the reputation of Hungary's wartime leader, Miklos Horthy, who was a vocal anti-Semite and complicit in the murder of the country's Jewish population during the Holocaust."
2017
The BBC removed a line from one of its online articles which had offended Jews and Muslims; the line had stated, "The Holocaust is a sensitive topic for many Muslims because Jewish survivors settled in British-mandate Palestine, on land which later became the state of Israel."
2017
Antisemitic fliers were circulated around Lakewood, New Jersey.
2017
An antisemitic banner was found in front of a Holocaust memorial at a synagogue in Lakewood, New Jersey.
2017
Fliers were found around Little Italy saying among other things, "We are killing off the entire white race by making them addicted to cocaine, crack, meth, spiked marijuana, ecstasy, spice, heroine, hash and other poisons, Adolph Hilter's [sic] Nazi's [sic] killed off six million ugly Jews by telling them to go into showers to get cleaned up for their new lives, then they locked the shower doors and poisoned them all to death with a deadly gas, and finally they grabbed all of the dead Jew's properties."
2017
The chairpersons of Chicago SlutWalk wrote, "We still stand behind Dyke March Chicago's decision to remove the Zionist contingent from their event, & we won't allow Zionist displays at ours", referring to a then-upcoming demonstration of theirs. The Chicago SlutWalk's organizers made the following declaration about the Star of David, "its connections to the oppression enacted by Israel is too strong for it to be neutral & IN CONTEXT [at the Dyke March Chicago event] it was used as a Zionist symbol."
2017
A resolution was passed by the San Francisco Board of Supervisors against "verbal and violent anti-Semitic assaults, both nationally and in the Bay Area"; the resolution also contained a promise to "stand in solidarity with Jewish and other communities whenever they are targeted or marginalized."
2017
A Jewish cemetery in St. Louis, Missouri was vandalized in an apparent antisemitic incident in February 2017, after which Linda Sarsour worked with other Muslim activists to launch a crowdfunding campaign to raise money to repair the damage and restore the gravesites. More than $125,000 was raised, and Sarsour pledged to donate any funds not needed at the cemetery to other Jewish community centers or sites targeted by vandalism. She said the fundraising effort would "send a united message from the Jewish and Muslim communities that there is no place for this type of hate, desecration, and violence in America". St. Louis's United Hebrew Congregation Senior Rabbi, Brigitte S. Rosenberg, whose congregants had family members buried in the vandalized cemetery, called the campaign "a beautiful gesture". However, the project generated some controversy as the funds were not distributed as quickly as some had expected. In 2018, Alzado Harris confessed to the desecration.
2017
Imam Sheikh Ammar Shahin gave an anti-semitic sermon at the Islamic Center of Davis, but apologized for it a few days later.
2017
At the end of July 2017, Kevin Myers contributed an article entitled "Sorry, ladies – equal pay has to be earned" to the Irish edition of The Sunday Times about the lower income of female presenters working for the BBC, after it was reported that two-thirds of the BBC's top paid stars were men and only one of its top ten best paid presenters is a woman. He speculated: "Is it because men are more charismatic performers? Because they work harder? Because they are more driven? Possibly a bit of each" and that men might be paid more because they "work harder, get sick less frequently and seldom get pregnant". Myers further alleged that Claudia Winkleman and Vanessa Feltz are higher paid than other female presenters because they are Jewish. He wrote: "Jews are not generally noted for their insistence on selling their talent for the lowest possible price, which is the most useful measure there is of inveterate, lost-with-all-hands stupidity". The editor of the Irish edition, Frank Fitzgibbon, issued a statement saying in part "This newspaper abhors anti-Semitism and did not intend to cause offence to Jewish people". Martin Ivens, editor of The Sunday Times, said the article should not have been published. Ivens and Fitzgibbon apologised for publishing it. After complaints from readers and the Campaign Against Antisemitism, the article was removed from the website. It has been announced by the newspaper that Myers will not write for The Sunday Times again. Myers was defended by the chair of the Jewish Representative Council of Ireland, Maurice Cohen, who said that Myers was not antisemitic, but had rather "inadvertently stumbled into an antisemitic trope. ... Branding Kevin Myers as either an antisemite or a Holocaust denier is an absolute distortion of the facts." Myers apologised for this article on radio, saying that "it is over for me professionally as far as I can see", and that "I think they [Jewish people] are the most gifted people who have ever existed on this planet and civilisation owes an enormous debt to them – I am very, very sorry that I should have so offended them."
2017
The Unite the Right rally was a gathering of far-right groups in Charlottesville, Virginia, United States, on 11 and 12 August 2017. On the evening of Friday, 11 August, a group of white nationalists—variously numbered at dozens, around 100, and hundreds—marched through the University of Virginia's campus while chanting things including "Jews will not replace us", and the Nazi slogan "Blood and Soil". On 12 August protesters and counterprotesters gathered at Emancipation Park (formerly known as Lee Park). White nationalist protesters chanted Nazi-era slogans, including "Blood and Soil". They shouted among other things, "Jews will not replace us." Some held posters targeting Jews that read "the Goyim know", using the Hebrew word for non-Jews, as well as "the Jewish media is going down". Also on 12 August, an attendee drove his car into a crowd of people protesting the rally, killing 32-year-old Heather D. Heyer and injuring 19 others, in what police have called a deliberate attack. The driver was identified as James Alex Fields Jr.; following the crash, his former high school history teacher said he was a Nazi sympathizer who held white supremacist views and was infatuated with Adolf Hitler. Two hours before the crash, a New York Daily News photographer snapped James brandishing a wooden shield emblazoned with the logo for neo-Nazi group Vanguard America, standing alongside its members. However, after he was arrested, the group issued a statement denying he was a member and saying "the shields were freely handed out to anyone in attendance."
2017
Several internet companies, such as domain registrar GoDaddy and video game chat application Discord, shut down services for neo-Nazi, white supremacist, alt-right website The Daily Stormer for violation of terms of service, and in response to the violence in Charlottesville, Virginia (see above item).
2017
On 14 August 2017, the New England Holocaust Memorial was damaged for the second time in as many months, by a 17-year-old who threw a rock at one of the glass panels.
2017
Two classroom windows at Temple Israel in Alameda were smashed.
2017
Ruth Thomann, the manager of the Paradies Arosa hotel in Switzerland, stated that it was wrong of her to post signs telling "Jewish guests" to shower before entering the pool and to use the refrigerator at set times, which she had done that year.
2017
Extremists marked the death of Adolf Hitler's deputy, Rudolf Hess, in Berlin. However, protestors blocked them from going to the former Spandau prison, where Hess hanged himself in 1987.
2017
Antisemitic graffiti was written on the walls of Oakland's Temple Sinai on Rosh Hashanah.
2017
ProPublica stated in September that a website was able to target ads at Facebook users who were interested in "how to burn Jew" and "Jew hater". Facebook removed the categories and said it would try to stop them from appearing to potential advertisers.
2017
An 18 October cartoon in the Daily Californian depicting Alan Dershowitz was denounced as anti-semitic by UC Berkeley Chancellor Carol Christ; Dershowitz agreed that the cartoon was anti-semitic. In an editorial on 25 October, Daily Californian editor Karim Doumar stated, "The criticisms we received reaffirms for us a need for a more critical editing eye, and a stronger understanding of the violent history and contemporary manifestations of anti-Semitism."
2017
In October 2017, Nigel Farage asserted in a LBC radio broadcast that the "Jewish lobby" in the United States was more concerning to him than Russian interference in American politics, saying: "There are other very powerful lobbies in the United States of America, and the Jewish lobby, with its links with the Israeli government, is one of those strong voices. ... There are about 6 million Jewish people living in America, so as a percentage it's quite small, but in terms of influence it's quite big." Farage's remarks were condemned by the Campaign Against Antisemitism and the Anti-Defamation League, which said that Farage's comment "plays into deep-seated anti-Semitic tropes" and was fuel for extremist conspiracy theories.
2017
Lecturer Hatem Bazian was denounced by UC Berkeley for retweeting cartoons the school decided had "crossed the line" into anti-Semitism. Bazian apologized and said "the image is offensive and does not represent my views or the anti-racist work that I do." The cartoons were first tweeted by Ron Hughes and later retweeted by Bazian.
2017
When Linda Sarsour was scheduled to deliver a commencement speech at the City University of New York (CUNY) in June 2017, some American conservatives strongly opposed her selection as speaker. Dov Hikind, a Democratic Party state assemblyman in New York, sent Governor Andrew Cuomo a letter objecting to the choice of Sarsour as speaker, signed by 100 Holocaust survivors. Hikind objected to Sarsour's role based on her previously having spoken alongside Rasmea Odeh, who was convicted by an Israeli court for taking part in a bombing that killed two civilians in 1969. Sarsour maintained that she had nothing to apologize for, saying that questions existed about the integrity of Odeh's conviction, that her beliefs had been misrepresented, and that criticism of Israeli policies was being conflated with anti-Semitism. She ascribed the critical reaction to her speech to her prominent role as an organizer for the 2017 Women's March. The university chancellor, the dean of the college, and a group of professors defended her right to speak, as did some Jewish groups, including Jews for Racial and Economic Justice. A group of prominent left-leaning Jews signed an open letter condemning attacks on Sarsour and promising "to [work] alongside her for a more just and equal society". Jonathan Greenblatt of the Anti-Defamation League defended Sarsour's First Amendment right to speak despite opposing her views on Israel. A rally in support of Sarsour took place in front of New York's City Hall. Constitutional scholar Fred Smith Jr. tied the controversy to broader disputes over freedom of speech in America.
2017
Academy of the Holy Cross in Maryland fired Greg Conte because of his involvement with a white nationalist think tank, Richard Spencer's National Policy Institute. Conte had also written on Twitter that "Hitler did not commit any crimes."
2017
9 December: 2017 Gothenburg Synagogue attack takes place in Gothenburg, Sweden.

== 2018 ==
2018
It was announced that Germany agreed to grant monetary compensation to Jews who were persecuted in Algeria during World War II; this marks the first time for Jews who resided in Algeria between July 1940 and November 1942 to be compensated by the German government.
2018
On 16 March 2018, Trayon White posted a video on his official Facebook page showing snow flurries falling, alluding to the Rothschild family conspiring to manipulate the weather. In his post, he stated, "Y'all better pay attention to this climate control, man, this climate manipulation ... And that's a model based off the Rothschilds controlling the climate to create natural disasters they can pay for to own the cities, man. Be careful." The comment was widely reported in the Washington media as an endorsement of an anti-Semitic conspiracy theory. The Washington City Paper reported on 19 March that this was not the first time White alluded to a Jewish conspiracy to control global weather. White later apologized for making the statement, and said he was working with Jews United for Justice to develop a deeper understanding of anti-semitism.
2018
Austrian foreign minister Karin Kneissl recalled diplomat Jürgen-Michael Kleppich from Israel after he was photographed wearing a T-shirt with slogans linked to Nazism.
2018 April 17: 2018 Berlin anti-semitic attack takes place.
2018
In April 2018, Syracuse University permanently expelled Theta Tau after video of members surfaced that the university chancellor considered to be "extremely racist, anti-Semitic, homophobic, sexist and hostile to people with disabilities."
2018
Alice Walker was asked by a New York Times interviewer, "What books are on your nightstand?" She listed David Icke's And the Truth Shall Set You Free, a book promoting an antisemitic conspiracy theory based on The Protocols of the Elders of Zion. Walker described the book as, "A curious person's dream come true."
2018
Israeli lawmakers Yuval Steinitz and Oren Hazan accused Jerusalem-born actress Natalie Portman of antisemitism and sought to revoke her citizenship, with Hazan calling her a "little hypocrite liar", after she decided not to travel to Israel and accept the US$2 million Genesis Prize.
2018
In 2018, media outlets reported on calls for the four co-chairs of the Women's March to resign for failing to denounce Nation of Islam leader Louis Farrakhan. The Daily Beast traced the controversy to February 2018, when Tamika Mallory attended a Nation of Islam Saviours' Day event hosted by Farrakhan, during which he referred to the "Satanic Jew" and declared that "the powerful Jews are my enemy". The Daily Beast later reported that the Women's March appeared to be losing support. In October 2018, actress Alyssa Milano, who spoke at the 2018 Women's March, told The Advocate that she refused to participate in the 2019 March unless Mallory and Linda Sarsour condemned what have been described as homophobic, antisemitic, and transphobic comments by Farrakhan. The Women's March released a statement about anti-Semitism, defending Sarsour and Mallory. In November 2018, Teresa Shook, the co-founder of the Women's March, called for march organizers Bob Bland, Mallory, Sarsour and Carmen Perez to resign, saying, "they have allowed anti-Semitism, anti-LBGTQIA sentiment and hateful, racist rhetoric to become a part of the platform by their refusal to separate themselves from groups that espouse these racist, hateful beliefs". The organization's leadership rebuffed calls to step down; Sarsour's initial response alleged that criticisms were motivated by racism and her opposition to Israel. Sarsour later issued a statement that apologized to the march's supporters for its "slow response" and condemned anti-semitism. In December 2018, Tablet published an article by Leah McSweeney and Jacob Siegel alleging that during the first meeting between Bland, Mallory, Perez, and others in the days after the 2016 US Presidential election, Mallory and Perez repeated an anti-Semitic canard promoted in Farrakhan's book The Secret Relationship Between Blacks and Jews telling fellow organizer Vanessa Wruble, who is Jewish, that Jews were leaders in the American slave trade and are especially responsible for subsequent exploitation of racial minorities. Wruble suggested that Mallory and Perez had berated her for her Jewish heritage, saying "your people hold all the wealth." Mallory denied Wruble's account but acknowledged telling "white women" at the meeting, including Wruble, that she "did not trust them."
2018
The Echo Music Prize was heavily criticized worldwide when Farid Bang and Kollegah received the award for best hip hop/urban album in April 2018. The nominated album, Jung, brutal, gutaussehend 3 (English: "Young, brutal, handsome 3"), contains the track "0815", in which the artists refer to their muscles as being more defined than those of Auschwitz inmates. The duo was even allowed to perform this track during the ceremony, despite heavy protests weeks before the award show. This was much criticized, and as a consequence, the Echo Music Prize was discontinued.
2018
An Israeli man wearing a yarmulke was attacked in Berlin; the attacker allegedly beat him with a belt and shouted, "Yehudi" — the Arabic word for Jew. Authorities stated that the man who was assaulted and another man wearing a yarmulke were insulted by three men and then whipped by one. In response to this, thousands of Germans took part in rallies against antisemitism, many of them wearing yarmulkes.
2018
On 25 February 2018, Tamika Mallory attended an anti-Semitic Louis Farrakhan speech, where she was directly acknowledged by Farrakhan. Farrakhan made multiple inflammatory comments during his three-hour speech. He claimed that "the powerful Jews are my enemy", that "the Jews have control over agencies of those agencies of government" like the FBI, that Jews are "the mother and father of apartheid", and that Jews are responsible for "degenerate behavior in Hollywood turning men into women and women into men". Mallory was criticized for her support of Louis Farrakhan, as well as her support of Assata Shakur, a former Black Liberation Army member convicted of murder.
2018
On 17 April 2018, Tamika Mallory criticized Starbucks for allowing the ADL, an organization dedicated to fighting anti-Semitism, to participate in a company-wide racial bias training after the arrest of two black men at a Starbucks in Philadelphia, claiming that the "ADL attacks black and brown people".
2018
Patrick Little, a Republican candidate for the Senate in California, was openly anti-semitic and even called for a United States "free from Jews."
2018
Paul Nehlen, a Republican candidate for Wisconsin's first congressional district, often made anti-semitic remarks on social media.
2018
John Fitzgerald, an anti-semite and Holocaust denier, was a Republican candidate for the House of Representatives.
2018
Walter Stolper of Florida was arrested after attempting to burn down his condo to "kill all the f------ Jews".
2018
Arthur J. Jones, an American neo-Nazi far-right white nationalist and Holocaust denier, was the Republican candidate for Illinois's 3rd congressional district.
2018
Antisemitic graffiti was discovered at Congregation Shaarey Tefilla in Indiana.
2018
U.S. Magistrate Mark Hornsby of Louisiana ruled that Jews are racially protected under Title VII of the Civil Rights Act of 1964, in a case regarding Joshua Bonadona's claim Louisiana College's president, Rick Brewer, refused to approve his hiring because of what he allegedly called Joshua's "Jewish blood."
2018
Stanford University student Hamzeh Daoud, who posted Facebook messages promising to "fight Zionists on campus", resigned as a resident assistant and said he would begin therapy.
2018
Antisemitic graffiti was found on the house where Elie Wiesel was born.
2018
Detention Officers Howard Costner and Jesse Jones of Spalding County were fired because of their online comments expressing sympathy for Hitler and American neo-Nazis.
2018
Antisemite Steve West won the Republican Missouri House primary election in the 15th District.
2018
Germany lifted a blanket ban on Nazi symbolism in video games, including the swastika.
2018
Antisemitic fliers were discovered near and at five East Bay synagogues.
2018
The painting Deux Femmes Dans Un Jardin by Pierre Auguste Renoir, which was stolen from the Jewish art collector Alfred Weinberger by Nazis in 1941, was returned to his granddaughter.
2018
Fliers blaming Jewish people for the sexual assault allegations against Brett Kavanaugh were posted on the University of California campuses of Berkeley and Davis, and at Vassar College.
2018
On 27 October 2018, 11 people were murdered in an attack on the Tree of Life – Or L'Simcha synagogue in Pittsburgh, Pennsylvania.
2018
Justin Trudeau, then the Prime Minister of Canada, gave a formal apology on behalf of Canada for its refusal to accept 907 Jewish refugees who, fleeing Nazi Germany, arrived in Canada on the MS St. Louis in 1939.
2018
A Jewish professor, Elizabeth Midlarsky, found swastikas spray-painted on her office walls at Columbia's Teachers College.
2018
In a Jewish cemetery in Strasbourg, France, antisemitic graffiti was written on tombstones.
2018, 23 March
Murder of Mireille Knoll.
2018 October
Vandals overturn headstones and smash vases in a Jewish cemetery in San Antonio, Texas.
2018 December
Two signs titled "Fake News" and "#MAGA," both frequently expressed by President Donald Trump and his supporters, are planted with arrows beneath them pointing to the marquee for the Holocaust Memorial Museum of San Antonio, Texas.

== 2019 ==
2019
Belgium outlawed Shechita (ritual slaughtering of animals).
2019
Democratic Rep. Ilhan Omar drew condemnation from Nancy Pelosi, the Democratic House leadership, and a number of Jewish organizations for a tweet that was perceived as antisemitic, in which she alleged that American support for Israel was rooted in money spent by pro-Israel lobbying organizations, notably the American Israel Public Affairs Committee (AIPAC). She later apologized for the tweet in a statement.
2019
Joan Ryan became the eighth MP to quit the Labour Party and join The Independent Group, citing a "culture of anti-Jewish racism" within the party as the reason for her departure.
2019 February
In February, Polish nationalist based in France disrupted The New Polish School of Holocaust Scholarship conference in EHESS, Paris. The Polish Institute of National Remembrance (IPN) which had made social media postings during the conference and sent a delegate, was criticized by French education minister Frédérique Vidal, who said the disturbances were "highly regrettable" and "anti-Semitic". Vidal further stated the disturbances organized by Gazeta Polska activists, appeared to have been condoned by the IPN whose representative did not condemn the disruption and which criticized the conference on social media that were further re-tweeted by the Embassy of Poland, Paris. Agitators stalked conference speakers in Paris, shouting insults such as "dirty Jew" that hark back to interwar antisemitism.
2019
Ian Austin quit Labour over a "culture of extremism, anti-semitism and intolerance" within the party under Jeremy Corbyn.
2019
Chris Williamson, a Labour MP, was suspended by his party over comments that Labour had "given too much ground" when responding to criticism over its handling of antisemitism within its ranks.
2019
A subway poster in Brooklyn with a picture of Ruth Bader Ginsburg (who was Jewish) was vandalized with the writing "Die, Jew Bitch!" and a swastika.
2019
The uptick in violence against Jews in Brooklyn continues with multiple violent attacks.
2019
The owners of the BerMax Caffé in Winnipeg are alleged to have perpetrated an act of fake antisemitism by vandalizing their café and fabricating a claim of assault, in similar fashion to the recent Jussie Smollett case in Chicago.
2019 April 4
Bet Israel Synagogue of İzmir, Turkey is attacked with a Molotov cocktail.
2019 April 27
The synagogue Chabad, of the city of Poway in California, was the site of an attack on 27 April 2019, in which multiple people were shot during Passover services. See Poway synagogue shooting.
2019
A synagogue in Halle, Germany, was attacked by a lone shooter who failed to gain access to the building. Two doors were damaged and improvised explosives set off. The attacker killed two people nearby.
2019
A Church of England report was published called "God's Unfailing World: Theological and practical perspectives on Christian-Jewish relations", that encouraged Christians to be repentant for "sins of the past" against Jews, and to challenge current stereotypes and attitudes against them. The report was the first time the Church of England made an authoritative statement about antisemitism.
2019
On 10 December 2019, a shooting occurred at a kosher grocery store located in the Greenville section of Jersey City, New Jersey United States. Five people were killed at the store, including the two attackers and three civilians. A civilian and two police officers were wounded. A Jersey City Police Department detective was shot and killed at a nearby cemetery just before the grocery store attack.
2019
Jersey City Mayor Steve Fullop said a trustee of the Jersey City Board of Education, Joan Terrell-Paige, should resign in the wake of her comment after the 2019 Jersey City shooting about Jew "brutes" that according to her have "threatened, intimidated and harassed" black residents. Terrell-Paige further asked whether the public is "brave enough" to listen to the perpetrators' message, and said the local rabbis were selling body parts. Nonetheless, she remained on the board until the 2022 elections.
2019
The Executive Order on Combating Anti-Semitism is an executive order announced by U.S. President Donald Trump on Tuesday, 10 December 2019, and signed the next day. The White House initially indicated that the order would define Judaism as a nationality instead of a religion in the United States, though the order ultimately released was more modest in its reach. The purpose of the order is claimed to be to prevent antisemitism by making it easier to use laws prohibiting institutional discrimination against people based on national origin to punish discrimination against Jewish people, including opposition to policies undertaken by the government of Israel. Some American Jews applauded the order, while others objected to defining Judaism as a nationality (as the order was initially indicated to do, though it ultimately did not), claiming that "Trump's reclassification of Judaism mirrored sentiments used by white nationalists and Nazi Germany" and that "the move appears to question whether Jews are really American". Some decried the order as a political stunt, and called on Trump to more directly address the threat of white nationalism.
2019
Monsey Hanukkah stabbing. A Jewish elder was killed and four others were injured in a mass stabbing at the home of a Hasidic rabbi, which was hosting Hanukkah celebrations, in Monsey, New York. The suspect was later apprehended by the police.

== 2020 ==
2020
Roald Dahl's family published a statement on the official Roald Dahl website apologising for his antisemitism. The statement, which is not prominent on the site, says "The Dahl family and the Roald Dahl Story Company deeply apologise for the lasting and understandable hurt caused by some of Roald Dahl's statements. Those prejudiced remarks are incomprehensible to us and stand in marked contrast to the man we knew ... We hope that, just as he did at his best, at his absolute worst, Roald Dahl can help remind us of the lasting impact of words."
2020, March
Beginning with the Coronavirus outbreak, Jewish synagogue services, schools, and institutions that had switched to virtual platforms were subjected to Zoombombing attacks with antisemitic imagery and messaging.
2020, 28 March
Tikvat Israel Congregation in Rockville, Md. vandalized with swastikas and other hate messages.
2020, mid-May
Tomb of Esther and Mordechai in Hamadan, Iran subjected to arson attack.
2020, 24 August
Jewish Center at the University of Delaware subjected to an arson attack.
2020, November
Six Igbo synagogues in Nigeria are razed by soldiers. At least 50 people were killed during the siege.
2020, December
Nation of Islam minister Ishmael Muhammad, in a live 6 Dec. broadcast from Chicago’s Mosque Maryam, repeats an earlier claim of Louis Farrakhan that Jews get a special version of the flu shot, while other populations receive one with toxic chemicals. In a subsequent sermon on 20 Dec., he references the "Synagogue of Satan" as promoting vaccines to sterilize Black people.
2020, 30 December
Congregation Beth Israel in northwest Portland, Oregon was subjected to an arson attack.

== 2021 ==
2021, April
A visibly Orthodox family visiting from Belgium was attacked by a knife-wielding assailant in Manhattan's Battery Park.
2021, April
Four synagogues in the Riverdale neighborhood of the Bronx were vandalized over a single weekend.
2021, October
George Washington University’s Alpha-Pi chapter of the Tau Kappa Epsilon fraternity reported that their house was broken into and vandalized, with a Sefer Torah being destroyed.
2021, November
The release trailer of Seth Rogen's Santa Inc. is flooded with antisemitic and Holocaust-denying comments, receiving over 200,000 dislikes before comments were disabled.

== 2022 ==
2022, January
Four hostages were taken at a synagogue in Colleyville, Texas.
2022, January
The neo-Nazi, antisemitic hate group and conspiracy theory network Goyim Defense League begins distributing flyers accusing Jews of being behind the COVID-19 pandemic.
2022, December
In December 2022, American musician Kanye West praised Adolf Hitler on InfoWars, saying "every human being has something of value that they brought to the table, especially Hitler", "I love Jewish people but I also love Nazis", "There's a lot of things that I love about Hitler; a lot of things" (with heavy emphasis on 'a lot' and 'love'), "I like Hitler", and "I am a Nazi".
2022, December
A man was arrested and charged for shouting antisemitic, racist and threatening statements during drop-off of children at Temple Beth El in Bloomfield Hills, MI's pre-school.

== 2023 ==
2023, February
During an episode of his podcast referencing comments made in 2019 by Minnesota Congresswoman Ilhan Omar about U.S. support for Israel, actor and commentator Joe Rogan stated the "idea that Jewish people are not into money is ridiculous. That's like saying Italians aren't into pizza."
2023, May 9
Mass shooting at El Ghriba Synagogue in Djerba, Tunisia.

== 2023-2025 ==
2023, October 7
On October 7, 2023, Hamas launched a large-scale attack on southern Israel, resulting in the deaths and injuries of hundreds of civilians. The attacks included shootings, bombings, and incursions into civilian areas. Many victims were killed, and others were taken hostage. International media and government sources described the attacks as the deadliest against Israeli civilians since 1948.

== See also ==
- Timeline of antisemitism
