= List of places named after the Jews =

== Geographical locations ==
- Judaean Desert
- Judaean Mountains

== States, autonomous regions ==
- Jewish Autonomous Oblast
- Judea
- State of Israel
- Yehud Medinata

== Districts ==
- Judea and Samaria Area
- Judenburg District

== Towns ==
Judenburg's coat of arms

- al-Yahudiya
- Evraiomnimata
- Judenau-Baumgarten
- Judenbach
- Jüdenberg
- Judenburg
- Tedef
- Yehud

== Villages ==
- Castrillo Mota de Judíos
- Jodensavanne
- La Mort aux Juifs

== Street names ==
- Frankfurter Judengasse
- Jodenbreestraat
- Jüdenstraße (Berlin-Mitte)
- Old Jewry

== Sites ==
- Jewish Quarter (Jerusalem)
- Jewish quarter (diaspora)
- Jewry Wall
