= Robert Nisbet (journalist) =

Robert Nisbet (born 1969) is a British former journalist and Regional Director for the Rail Delivery Group. He is Chief Storytelling Officer at The Fourth Angel PR agency.

Initially a newsreader and occasional cover for the Dave Barrett phone-in on GWR FM. He then became presenter and correspondent for BBC News, presenting the Liquid News programme on BBC News 24 channel and Entertainment Correspondent for the BBC Six O'Clock News. In 2005 he then joined Sky Television, part of British Sky Broadcasting, as entertainment correspondent. From September 2011 he was Europe Correspondent based in Brussels, Belgium.

== Education ==
Nisbet was educated at Highgate School, then a boys' independent school, in the Highgate, north London, followed by the University of Bristol, where he studied history. He then studied for a postgraduate degree in journalism at the Cardiff School of Journalism, Media and Cultural Studies.

== Journalism career ==
=== BBC News ===
Nisbet spent several years at the BBC, mainly as a correspondent for BBC News but also as chief reporter on BBC Choice's entertainment news show Liquid News. It was Nisbet who discovered the body of presenter Christopher Price after he died from a rare brain infection in 2002. Following the end of Liquid News, Nisbet went on to present The Morning Show, a short-lived daytime show on BBC One with the Pop Idol judge Nicki Chapman, in 2003, but that was cancelled after poor viewing figures.

=== Sky News ===
Nisbet joined Sky News in January 2005 as a special correspondent and reported on Live at Five and the former show, The Sky Report, filming a series of undercover reports including one featuring the controversial Kansas preacher Fred Phelps. In June 2006, he was appointed Environment Correspondent for the channel, anchoring Sky News' Green Britain week from Lutterworth, Leicestershire, in January 2007. In August 2007, Nisbet was replaced by Catherine Jacob and became Sky's Washington-based US correspondent.

== Public relations ==
In April 2018 Nisbet joined the Rail Delivery Group (RDG) "a membership body in the British railway system, bringing together the companies that run Britain's railway into a single team with one goal – to deliver a better railway for Britain, its businesses and communities" as Regional Director on the Executive Committee, where his previous journalistic experience has led him to fulfill the post of broadcast spokesman.

Nisbet is a member of the Reform think tank's Advisory Board and a Leader in Residence at the University of Central Lancashire.
