= Colin Paterson =

Scottish journalist and broadcaster

Colin Paterson (born 1974) is a Scottish journalist and broadcaster who is an Arts and Entertainment correspondent for the BBC and has been a presenter and reporter on BBC Three's Liquid News.

== Early life ==
He attended the independent Hutchesons' Grammar School in Glasgow, leaving in 1992. He then went on to study at St Andrews University in Scotland, where he graduated with a second class MA in economics.

== Career ==
He began his career as a reporter for The Big Breakfast, and in 2001 he started writing a music column for The Guardian. He became a reporter for Liquid News in September 2001, becoming a presenter in 2002, replacing 34-year-old Christopher Price who died of meningoencephalitis.

He is a stand-in presenter on BBC Radio 5 Live, having covered for Richard Bacon, Tony Livesey and Simon Mayo. He is the main BBC Radio correspondent for the Oscars and Glastonbury. Until January 2010 he was a regular pundit on The Radio 2 Arts Show with Claudia Winkleman. The pair first worked together as co-presenters on Liquid News.

In 2008 Paterson did an interview with Noel Gallagher in which he asked him to comment on Jay-Z's being booked as a headline act for the Glastonbury festival. Gallagher replied saying that hip-hop was 'wrong' for Glastonbury. This resulted in much media controversy and Jay-Z hit back at Noel's comments by playing out Paterson's interview with the Oasis frontman before his headline set on the main stage at Glastonbury.

In 2011, Paterson relocated to the BBC's new centre at MediaCityUK in Salford, near Manchester.

He was the first BBC reporter to broadcast from the scene of the Manchester Arena terrorist attack on 22 May 2017.

He has covered every Oscars since 2005 and 16 in total, with Radio 5 Live broadcasting an annual preview show on the day of the awards and live coverage from the Vanity Fair Party into their Monday breakfast show.

At the 2014 Oscars, Paterson was broadcasting live on Radio 4's Today programme when he spotted Bono walking past and shouted "BONO!" seven times in the manner of Alan Partridge. However, Bono did eventually come over to be interviewed.
