= God's Gift (TV series) =

- Genre: Dating game show
- Presented by: Davina McCall; Claudia Winkleman
- Narrated by: Stuart Hall
- Country of origin: United Kingdom
- Original language: English
- No. of series: 2
- No. of episodes: 75

Production
- Running time: 60 minutes (inc. adverts)
- Production company: Granada

Original release
- Network: ITV
- Release: 3 January 1996 – 18 December 1998

God's Gift is a British dating game show that aired on ITV from 4 January 1996 to 3 April 1998. The first series was presented by Davina McCall and Claudia Winkleman hosted the second series. The show's title came from the phrase "God's gift to women", i.e. an ironic description of a would-be Casanova.

== Format ==
Each week, five male contestants would vie with each other to win the affections and votes of a female audience (or a male audience on "gay specials") by participating in a series of facetious games designed to "test" their sex appeal. The winner's prize would be to take an audience member of his choice out on a date, which was then filmed for broadcast in the following week's show.

== Broadcast ==
The series was screened overnight on ITV, the day and time of the broadcasts and repeat depended on the nighttime feed, although it was dropped by Yorkshire and Tyne Tees Television part-way through series one.

=== Series guide ===
- Series 1: 50 editions (including 2 best of compilations), first shown on 3 January 1996.
- Series 2: 25 editions, first shown from 6 February 1998. The series was screened in two blocks, with the second block of episodes starting in late September 1998.
