= HeadJam =

- Presented by: Vernon Kay
- Country of origin: United Kingdom
- Original language: English

Production
- Producer: Woof!
- Running time: 30 minutes

Original release
- Network: BBC Three
- Release: 2 July – 26 August 2004

HeadJam is a BBC Television game show hosted by Vernon Kay. It originally aired during the summer of 2004 on BBC Three, with a repeat soon afterwards on BBC Two.

It features two teams, each consisting of a member of the public and a celebrity. Celebrities included Claudia Winkleman, DJ Spoony, Joe Cornish, Lauren Laverne, Natalie Casey, Paddy O'Connell, Edith Bowman, Mark Durden-Smith, Julie Fernandez and Ed Byrne.

All the contestants and celebrity contestants play a variety of rounds, answering questions about popular culture. Rounds included Spoonerisms, guessing TV themes and film taglines, and general knowledge questions about specific years. The contestant with the most points at the end played a final round, named "HeadJam", in which the member of the public had to memorise and then deliver the answers to eight questions in order.
