= Claudia Winkleman =

English television presenter (born 1972)

Claudia Winkleman MBE
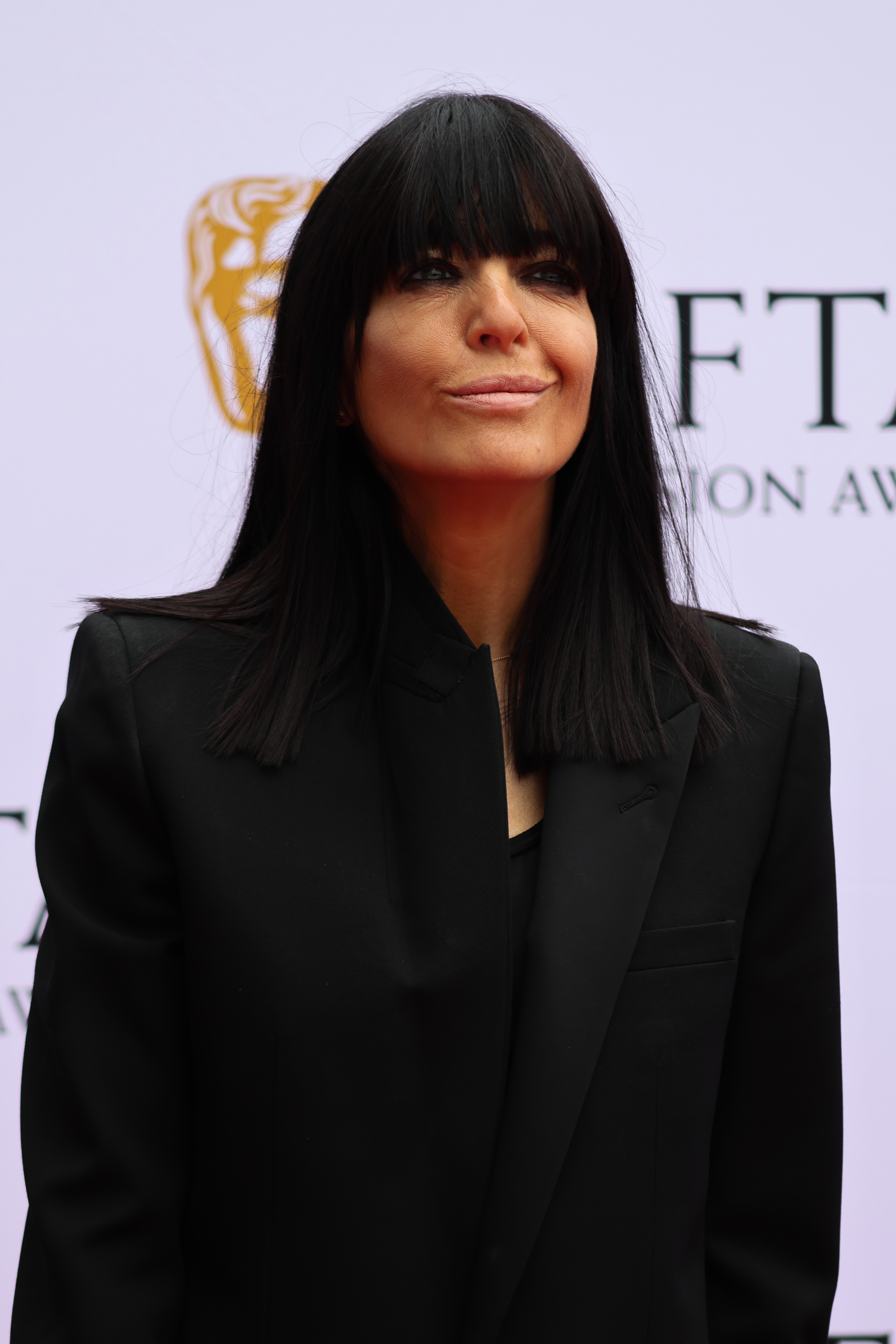
- Winkleman in 2026
- Born: Claudia Anne Irena Winkleman; 15 January 1972 (age 54); London, England
- Education: New Hall, University of Cambridge
- Occupations: Broadcaster; journalist
- Years active: 1991–present
- Employer(s): BBC; Channel 4
- Spouse: Kris Thykier (m. 2000)
- Children: 3
- Mother: Eve Pollard
- Relatives: Sophie Winkleman (half-sister); Sir Nicholas Lloyd (step-father); Sally Soames (aunt); Lord Frederick Windsor (brother-in-law); Tracy-Ann Oberman (second cousin)

Claudia Anne Irena Winkleman (born 15 January 1972) is a British broadcaster, journalist and television presenter. She co-presented the BBC One dance competition Strictly Come Dancing (2010–2025) and hosts the BBC One reality series The Traitors (2022–present), the latter of which won her a BAFTA award in 2023. She hosted the Saturday mid-morning show on BBC Radio 2 from 2020 to 2024. Winkleman was appointed Member of the Order of the British Empire (MBE) in the 2025 Birthday Honours for services to broadcasting.

== Early life ==
Claudia Anne Irena Winkleman was born in Westminster into a Jewish family on 15 January 1972, the daughter of author and journalist Eve Pollard and book publisher Barry Winkleman. She grew up in the Hampstead area of London.

Her parents divorced when she was three. Her father's marriage to children's author Cindy Black produced a half-sister, actress Sophie Winkleman, who married Lord Frederick Windsor. Her mother's marriage to Nicholas Lloyd gave her a half-brother, Oliver.

Winkleman was educated at the City of London School for Girls before attending New Hall, Cambridge, where she graduated in art history.

== Career ==
=== Television ===
==== 1991–2000 ====
Her television career started in 1992, when Winkleman began appearing frequently in the long-running BBC series Holiday. This continued throughout the mid-1990s and culminated in a special documentary in which she travelled around the world for 34 days, reporting from Japan, India, Costa Rica and Dubai. Throughout this period, she appeared as a reporter on other shows, particularly This Morning, interviewing various celebrities. During the late 1990s, Winkleman presented a number of programmes on smaller digital channels. She had a stint on the cable channel L!VE TV, but soon left to pursue other projects. In 1996, Winkleman hosted Granada programmes God's Gift (taking over from Davina McCall) and Pyjama Party (co-hosted with Katie Puckrik and Michelle Kelly).

Winkleman also presented a number of gameshows, including the dating show Three's a Crowd, LWT show Talking Telephone Numbers, the second series of Granada TV show God's Gift, and Fanorama. In 1997 she was the co-host of children's Saturday morning TV show Tricky. She was also an occasional team captain on a gameshow called HeadJam, hosted by Vernon Kay.

==== 2001–2006 ====
Winkleman's first major television job was in 2001, on the regional discussion programme Central Weekend. Between 2002 and 2004, she began her first daily television role as host of the BBC Three Entertainment update show Liquid News, taking over from Christopher Price on the now defunct BBC Choice. She shared the presenting duties with Colin Paterson, and later Paddy O'Connell. The show featured celebrity interviews.

In 2003, Fame Academy appointed Winkleman to present a daily update show on BBC Three, in conjunction with its second series. She repeated the show in 2005 for the much shorter celebrity version Comic Relief Does Fame Academy. Also in 2005, Winkleman co-hosted The House of Tiny Tearaways, a BBC Three reality TV show. She also began hosting Strictly Come Dancing: It Takes Two, a supplementary programme to Strictly Come Dancing.

Winkleman then presented several more reality shows, including End of Story and Art School.

==== 2007–2012 ====
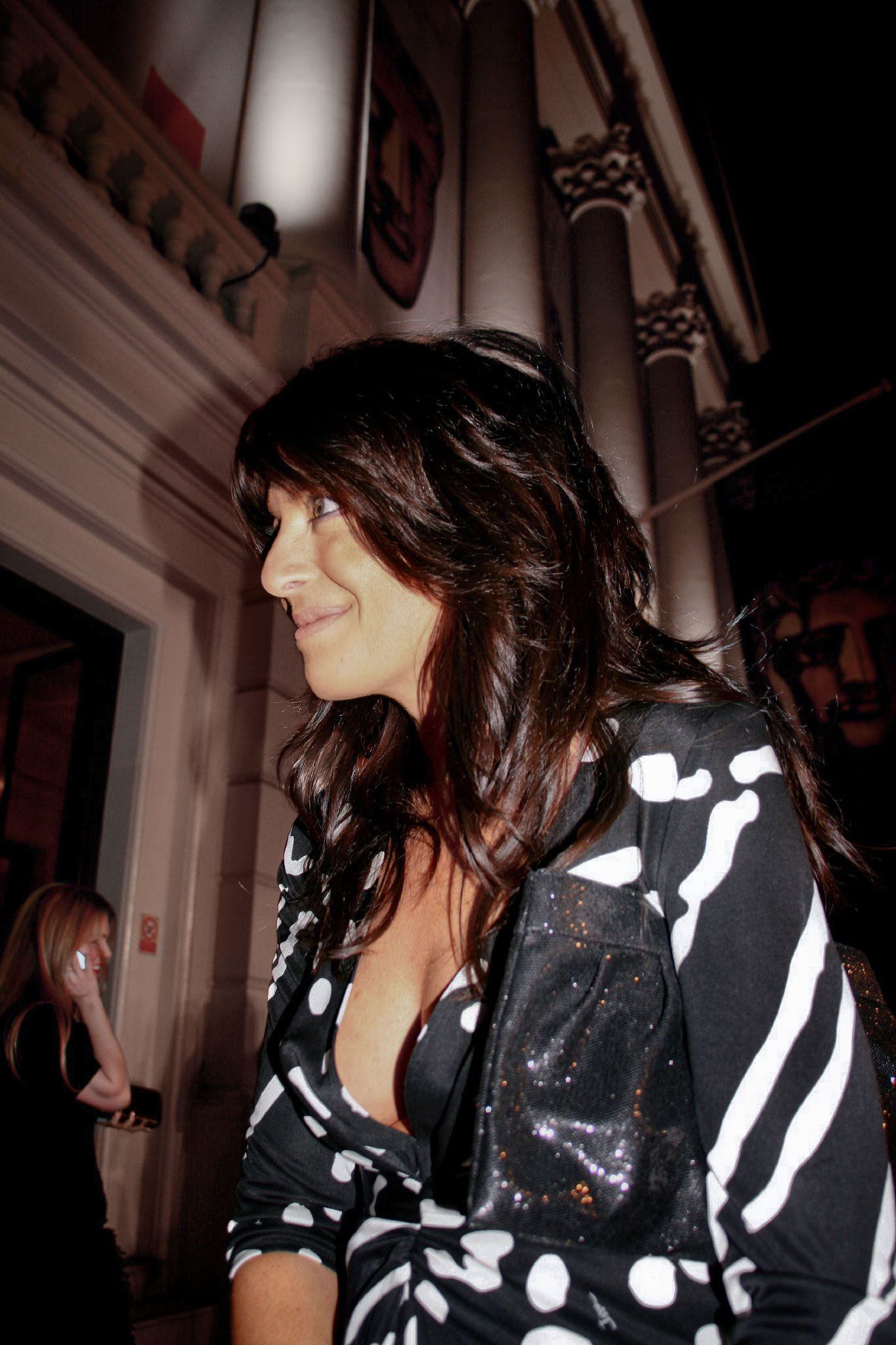
Winkleman in 2008

Winkleman, along with Graham Norton, hosted the first annual Eurovision Dance Contest, which was held on 1 September 2007, in London, England. The format was based on the BBC's Strictly Come Dancing and the EBU's Eurovision Song Contest. Norton and Winkleman also hosted the 2008 contest in Glasgow, Scotland.

Winkleman narrated the 2008 BBC Three show Glamour Girls, a documentary series about glamour modelling in Britain.

In March 2009, Winkleman was announced as the host of the new series of Hell's Kitchen on ITV1. She fronted the nightly show live from the restaurant in East London in its fourth series in the spring. On 14 November 2009, she appeared on the main show of Strictly Come Dancing to present backstage, due to main presenter Bruce Forsyth being on sick leave. She co-hosted the show with Tess Daly and guest presenter Ronnie Corbett.

On 29 March 2010, she was named as one of the new co-presenters of the Film programme, replacing Jonathan Ross. The Guardian stated, in reference to her recent hosting of Sky Television's coverage of The Oscars, that Winkleman had "proved both a passionate and engaging advocate of cinema". Her husband Kris Thykier is a film producer with credits on several mainstream releases.

==== 2013–present ====
On 2 April 2013, Winkleman began presenting the BBC Two sewing competition The Great British Sewing Bee, continuing until 2016. The show went off air for 2017, but was brought back in 2018, with Joe Lycett replacing Winkleman as presenter.

In 2015, she appeared on The Big Fat Anniversary Quiz. In May 2015, she appeared on an episode of Watchdog on BBC One in which she discussed, during a segment on dangerous Halloween costumes, that the previous year her daughter had been badly burned when the costume she was wearing caught fire. In November 2016, Winkleman presented the one-off BBC special Bublé at the BBC with Michael Bublé.

From 2018, she presented Britain's Best Home Cook and The Makeover Show for BBC One. In May 2018, Winkleman co-presented The Biggest Weekend on BBC Two and BBC Radio 2.

In 2022, she began hosting the BBC reality gameshow The Traitors, in which contestants respond to challenges testing loyalty and deception. A second series was announced in February 2023, with Winkleman returning as host, premiering on 3 January 2024. Winkleman returned to host the third series, premiering on 1 January 2025, followed by a Celebrity Traitors series in October 2025. On 1 January 2026, Winkleman hosted the fourth series.

In 2023, Winkleman hosted a five-part Channel 4 competition show The Piano, which gave amateur pianists the chance to perform at London's Royal Festival Hall. The show was renewed for a second and third series, a Christmas special, and a documentary focusing on the winner of the first series, Lucy Illingworth.

On 29 December 2025, it was announced that Winkleman would host her own celebrity chat show on BBC One from spring 2026, named The Claudia Winkleman Show. On 16 July 2026, Winkleman announced that she had declined to return for a second series, disclosing that she found the chat show format uncomfortable.

==== Strictly Come Dancing ====
Strictly Come Dancing: It Takes Two was devised as a companion show to run alongside the second series of Strictly Come Dancing, and continues to run. It follows a similar format to the one Winkleman hosted on Fame Academy, and sees the presenter deliberating and dissecting the ins and outs of the main competition, accompanied by dance experts, assorted guests and the competitors themselves. The show is aired every weekday at 6:30 pm on BBC Two throughout the course of the series.

Strictly Come Dancing: It Takes Two was hosted by Winkleman from its inception. In 2011, former contestant Zoe Ball took over as host from Winkleman.

In 2010, Winkleman became co-host of the Sunday night results show of Strictly Come Dancing, presenting alongside Tess Daly. Following Bruce Forsyth's departure in 2014, her role expanded to include presenting the main show.

On 23 October 2025, Winkleman and Daly jointly announced that they would leave the show following completion of the latest series and the recording of the Christmas Special.

=== Writing ===
Winkleman started her journalism career as a travel writer, writing columns about her various worldwide excursions in The Sunday Times and The Independent, and the free daily paper Metro. She began to write more general work, opinion-led lifestyle journalism about womanhood, sex and relationships. She wrote for Cosmopolitan and Tatler amongst others. Between 2005 and 2008, she wrote a regular weekly column for The Independent called Take It From Me.

=== Radio ===
In April and May 2008, Winkleman hosted a six-part comedy quiz series taking a humorous look into the week's celebrity gossip, called Hot Gossip. The show was broadcast on a Saturday afternoon on BBC Radio 2; points were awarded to those who dished out dirt. The show featured pundits including Will Smith, Phil Nichol, Jo Caulfield, Rufus Hound and Jonathan Ross' brother, Paul.

She hosted a weekly show on BBC Radio 2 every Friday night between 10pm and midnight called Claudia Winkleman's Arts Show, consisting of interviews with people from the arts world, as well as reviews and debate. In July 2010, Winkleman sat in for Dermot O'Leary. She covered for Ken Bruce on several occasions from 2012 until 2014.

In April 2016, she began presenting her own Sunday night show on BBC Radio 2 called Claudia on Sunday from 7 to 9pm. In June 2017, Winkleman covered for Steve Wright in the Afternoon from 2 to 5pm.

In 2020, Claudia on Sunday was displaced from the schedules and subsequently ended due to the COVID pandemic. It was announced on 23 November 2020 that Winkleman had taken over the Saturday mid-morning slot on BBC Radio 2 from Graham Norton. Winkleman's last Saturday morning show was broadcast on 23 March 2024, with Romesh Ranganathan taking over.

== Charity ==
In 2007, Winkleman answered telephones at the BT Tower for the Disasters Emergency Committee in response to a humanitarian crisis in Darfur. In May 2007, she helped relaunch The National Missing Persons Campaign, and also supported a Christmas campaign by the charity Refuge, which aimed to stop domestic violence.

On 18 March 2011, Winkleman was one of the presenters of BBC's Comic Relief.

In 2012, Winkleman was one of the judges and the host of the FilmNation shorts at the British Film Institute, which, as part of the Cultural Olympiad for the 2012 Summer Olympics, encouraged people aged 14–25 to get involved in filmmaking.

In March 2025, Winkleman was appointed a trustee of the British Museum. She said of the appointment: "I am deeply honoured to join the Museum's Board of Trustees and hope that I can in some small way help it to continue its mission to curate, conserve and explain our history for the benefit and education of all."

In April 2026, Winkleman emphasised the importance of supporting teachers, educators and curriculum resources, as well as addressing antisemitism, while taking part in a fundraising event for the Lira Winston Fellowship at St John's Wood Synagogue. In the 2020s, she discussed the rise in antisemitism in the context of the Israel–Gaza war and the 7 October attacks, which were followed by a sharp increase in antisemitic incidents in the UK. Winkleman had previously been among a number of Jewish television presenters targeted in connection with a Sunday Times incident.

== Personal life ==
In June 2000, Winkleman married film producer Kris Thykier at Marylebone Town Hall. The couple have lived in Connaught Square in the City of Westminster since 2006. They have three children: a son born in March 2003, a daughter born in June 2006, and a second son born in July 2011.

On 31 October 2014, Winkleman's daughter was taken to hospital after being seriously injured when her Halloween costume caught fire. Winkleman stated that the costume had brushed against a lit candle in a pumpkin. The incident prompted the UK government to tighten the flame retardant standards of Halloween costumes.

Winkleman was born with severe myopia and has undergone multiple surgeries on her eyes.

Her half-sister, Sophie, married into the British royal family when she became the wife of Lord Frederick Windsor, the son of Prince and Princess Michael of Kent.

== Honours and awards ==
Winkleman was appointed Member of the Order of the British Empire (MBE) in the 2025 Birthday Honours for services to broadcasting.

=== Awards & nominations ===
Year	Category	Nominee	Result	Ref.
2026	BAFTA TV Awards	Best Entertainment Performance	Nominated	
2025	Royal Television Society	Entertainment Performance	Nominated	
2025	Royal Television Society	Outstanding Achievement Award	Won	
2025	BAFTA TV Awards	Best Entertainment Performance	Nominated	
2025	National Reality TV Awards	Best TV Presenter	Nominated	
2024	National Reality TV Awards	Best TV Presenter	Nominated	
2023	BAFTA Awards	Best Entertainment Performance	Won	
2023	National Reality TV Awards	Best TV Presenter	Nominated	
2023	National Reality TV Awards	Celebrity Personality of the Year	Nominated	
2023	Edinburgh TV Festival	Outstanding Achievement Award	Won	
2020	TRIC Awards	TV Personality	Nominated	
2020	Heat Unmissable Awards	Book of the Year	Won	
2019	BAFTA Awards	Best Entertainment Performance	Won	
2019	WFTV Awards	Presenter Award	Won	
2017	BAFTA Awards	Best Entertainment Performance	Nominated	
2017	Heat Unmissable Awards	Ultimate TV Presenter	Won	
2015	Royal Television Society	Entertainment Performance	Won	
2015	Glamour Awards	TV Presenter	Won	
2014	TRIC Awards	TV Personality	Nominated	

== Filmography ==
=== Television ===
Year	Title	Role	Notes
1992–1995	Holiday	Co-presenter	
TBD	L!VE TV	Co-presenter	
TBD	This Morning	Roving reporter	
1996	Pajama Party	with Katie Puckrick and Michelle Kelly	Co-presenter
1997	Tricky	Presenter	
1997	Talking Telephone Numbers	Co-presenter	with Phillip Schofield
1998	God's Gift	Presenter	Series 2
2001	Fanorama	Presenter	
2002–2004	Liquid News	Presenter	
2003–2005, 2007	Comic Relief Does Fame Academy	Co-presenter	BBC Three coverage (2003–2005); BBC One main show (2007)
2004–2010	Strictly Come Dancing: It Takes Two	Presenter	7 series; spin-off series
2004	HeadJam	Team captain	
2004	Three's A Crowd	Presenter	
2005–2007	The House of Tiny Tearaways	Presenter	4 series
2007–2008	Eurovision Dance Contest	Co-presenter	with Graham Norton
2008	Eurovision: Your Decision	Co-presenter	with Sir Terry Wogan
2008	Glamour Girls	Narrator	
2009–2015	Comic Relief	Co-presenter	
2009, 2027	Hell's Kitchen	Presenter	1 series
2010–2018	Sport Relief	Co-presenter	
2010–2016	Film...	Co-presenter	
2010–2025	Strictly Come Dancing	Co-presenter	Results shows only (2010–2013); Main co–host (2014–2025)
2013–2016	The Great British Sewing Bee	Presenter	4 series
2016	Bublé at the BBC	Presenter	One-off special
2017	The Year in Music 2017	Co-presenter	with Clara Amfo
2017	W1A	Herself	1 episode
2018–2021	Britain's Best Home Cook	Presenter	3 series
2018	The Biggest Weekend	Co-presenter	
2019	Icons: The Greatest Person of the 20th Century	Co-presenter	with Nick Robinson
2020	One World: Together at Home	Co-presenter	with Dermot O'Leary and Clara Amfo
2022	Taskmaster	Contestant	1 episode
2022–2025	One Question	Presenter	2 series
2022–present	The Traitors	Presenter	4 series
2023–present	The Piano	Presenter	3 series
2025–present	The Celebrity Traitors	Presenter	2 series
2026	The Claudia Winkleman Show	Presenter	1 series

=== Radio ===
Year	Title	Role	Station
2008	Hot Gossip	Presenter	BBC Radio 2
2010	Dermot O'Leary	Stand-in presenter	BBC Radio 2
2008–2013	Claudia Winkleman's Arts Show	Presenter	BBC Radio 2
2012–2014	Ken Bruce	Stand-in presenter	BBC Radio 2
2016–2020	Claudia on Sunday	Presenter	BBC Radio 2
2017	Steve Wright in the Afternoon	Stand-in presenter	BBC Radio 2
2018	The Biggest Weekend	Co-presenter	BBC Radio 2
2021–2024	Saturday mid-mornings	Presenter	BBC Radio 2
2022	'The Voice of Reason' – Gavin Dodds Podcast	Storytime listener and poet	
