= Clare McDonnell =

British radio broadcaster

- Presenting career
- Show: 5 Live Drive
- Network: BBC Radio 5 Live
- Time slot: 16:00–19:00
- Country: Worldwide
- Previous show: Liquid News

Clare McDonnell (born 1967, England) is a Sony Radio Academy Awards winning British radio broadcaster and presenter.

== Career ==
McDonnell began as a reporter in local radio in England, and from there moved on to be a radio presenter.

For several years, she presented the Breakfast Show on BBC GLR Radio, and many shows on national radio, such as the Trade Update series on BBC Radio 1, and Global on BBC Radio 5 Live, where she also worked on the Nicky Campbell Show as the Euro News presenter.

McDonnell was a television presenter on Liquid News, an entertainment news show on BBC One and BBC Three.

She was one of the original presenters at the launch of BBC Radio 6 Music in March 2002, starting with a Saturday afternoon show. She later presented the weekend overnight music show on Saturday and Sunday until her final broadcast on BBC Radio 6 Music on 28 March 2010.

In January 2010 she started co-presenting the breakfast show with John Warnett on BBC Radio Kent

As of January 2021, McDonnell was one of the main presenters for the 05:00–08:00 GMT edition of Newsday on the BBC World Service.

She is now a co-presenter of Drive on BBC Radio 5 Live.
