= Courtemaux =

- Commune
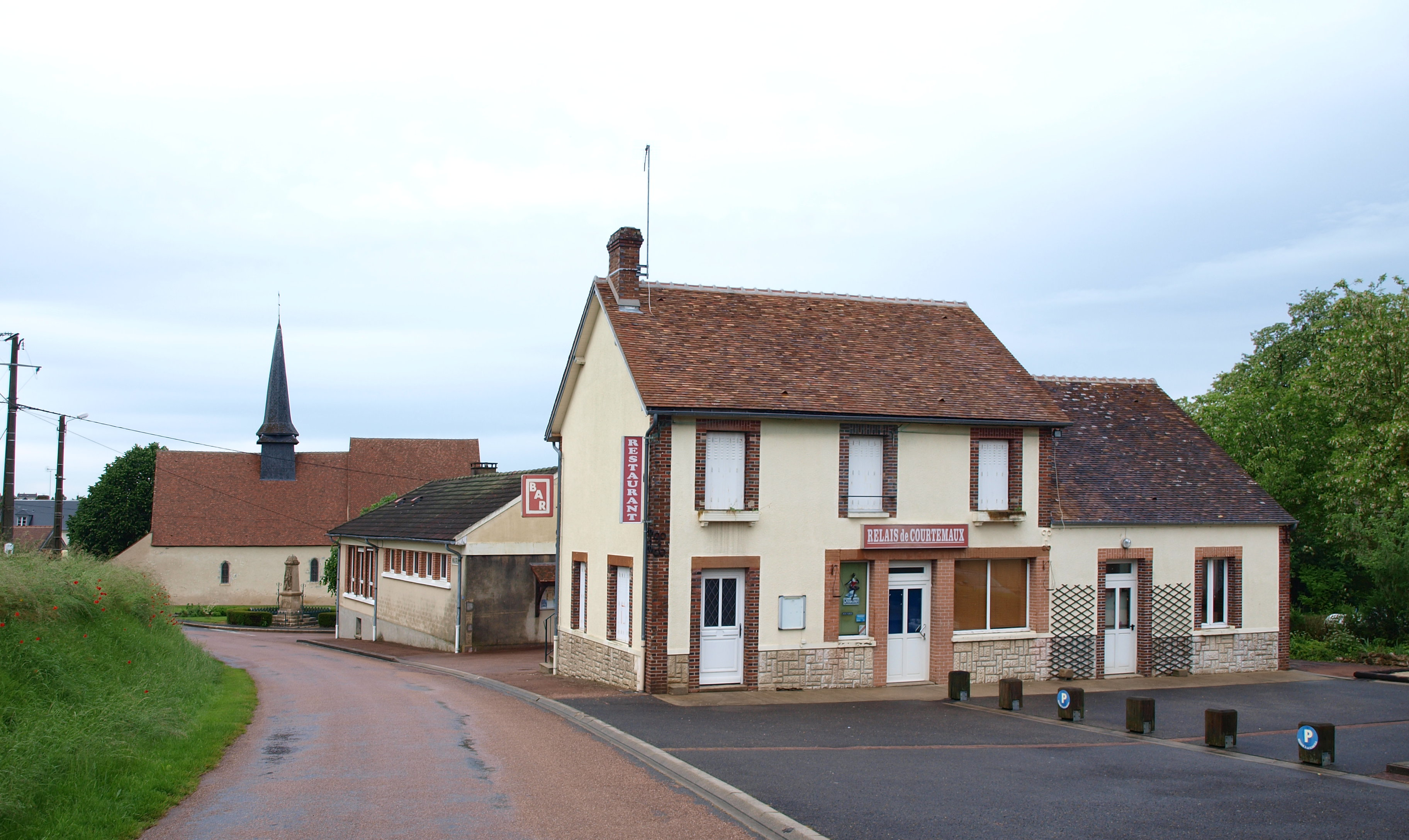
- The centre of Courtemaux

- Coat of arms
- Location of Courtemaux
- Location within France Location within Centre-Val de Loire
- Coordinates: 48°03′02″N 2°56′06″E
- Country: France
- Region: Centre-Val de Loire
- Department: Loiret
- Arrondissement: Montargis
- Canton: Courtenay

Government
  - Mayor (2020–2026): Hélène Gauthier-Poulet
- Area^{1}: 12.19 km^{2} (4.71 sq mi)
- Highest elevation: 154 m (505 ft)
- Lowest elevation: 110 m (360 ft)
- Population (2023): 261
  - Density: 21.4/km^{2} (55.5/sq mi)
- Demonym: Courtemaliens
- Time zone: UTC+01:00 (CET)
  - Summer (DST): UTC+02:00 (CEST)
- INSEE/Postal code: 45113 /45320
- ^{1} French Land Register data, which excludes lakes, ponds, glaciers > 1 km^{2} (0.386 sq mi or 247 acres) and river estuaries.

Courtemaux (French pronunciation: [kuʁtəmo]) is a commune in the Loiret department in north-central France.

== See also ==
- La Mort aux Juifs
- Communes of the Loiret department
