= Liquid News =

British TV programme (2000–2004)

- Genre: Entertainment news
- Created by: Chris Wilson; Christopher Price; Stuart Murphy
- Presented by: Christopher Price; Colin Paterson; Claudia Winkleman; Clare McDonnell; Julia Morris; Iain Lee; Jasmine Lowson; Paddy O'Connell; Jo Whiley; Joe Mace; Amanda Byram
- Theme music composer: Moby
- Country of origin: United Kingdom
- Original language: English
- No. of series: 4

Production
- Executive producers: Chris Wilson; David Ford
- Production location: BBC Television Centre
- Editor: Steve Hughes
- Running time: 30:00
- Production company: BBC

Original release
- Network: BBC Choice (2000–2003); BBC One (2001–2003); BBC Three (2003–2004)
- Release: 30 May 2000 – 1 April 2004

Related
- Zero30

Liquid News is an entertainment news programme which was broadcast by the BBC from 30 May 2000 to 1 April 2004. It was a daily round-up which was shown on BBC Choice and later on BBC Three. The show was also broadcast weekly on BBC One and editions were also produced for the international channels, BBC Prime and BBC America.

The programme evolved from Zero 30, an earlier entertainment programme on BBC News 24. When that was dropped from the 24-hour news channel, the controller of BBC Choice, Stuart Murphy, took the format and brought it to the channel where it soon became the flagship programme.

== Format ==
Each show started with a rundown of the headlines that featured in that edition of Liquid News after the main titles and the host introducing themselves. The show featured celebrity news from around the world (though mainly the UK), including live reports from staff in New York, Los Angeles and Cannes during the Cannes Film Festival.

Every edition had guests in the studio with the host to provide their opinions on the news featured, offer their views and to reflect with the host on those stories and to plug their own shows or records that they were promoting at the time.

The show would divide itself into sections of discussion which usually fell into the categories of music, film, television and sometimes sport which featured a main story of a pre-recorded or insert live from the regular roster of Liquid News reporters.

A number of special editions of Liquid News were made to celebrate major events in the celebrity world, which left the usual confines of the studio. One such edition took place at a rooftop pool in which Christopher Price was behind a small tiki bar with the guests sitting on bar stools.

== Cancellation ==
In April 2004, Liquid News was cancelled. Murphy, controller of BBC Three and who originally commissioned Liquid News for BBC Choice, stated that the show would end as a way to "refresh the channel's output to best serve the audience". The news element of the channel was unaffected by the ending of the programme with 60 Seconds and The 7 O'Clock News already in existence, with the latter revamped as a half hour programme with a larger budget to replace Liquid News.

The 7 O'Clock News was cancelled in December 2005, while 60 Seconds departed screens alongside the original incarnation of BBC Three as a linear channel in February 2016. Since BBC Three's return to linear television in 2022, its news output has solely consisted of The Catch Up.

== Presenters ==
Liquid News was originally a vehicle for presenter Christopher Price. Following his death on 21 April 2002, the show continued with a variety of presenters, beginning with Dale Winton and also including Colin Paterson, Claudia Winkleman, Julia Morris, Iain Lee, Jasmine Lowson, Paddy O'Connell, Lorraine Kelly, Phill Jupitus, Julian Clary, Jonathan Ross, Jo Whiley, Joe Mace and Amanda Byram.

The programme was relaunched on 6 October 2002, with Claudia Winkleman and Colin Paterson becoming the main presenters alongside new branding and the introduction of a Sunday night edition, whilst Julia Morris and Heat editor Mark Frith presented a revamped Friday evening edition.

In July 2003, Paddy O'Connell replaced Paterson, who remained on the programme as a reporter.

== Reporters ==
The line-up of reporting staff included Colin Paterson, Stephanie West, Vanessa Langford, Tamzin Sylvester and Ruth Liptrot.

== Theme music ==
Both versions of the theme tune were composed by Moby. The first theme was an original composition that had not been included on the Play album, titled "Bedhead".

The second theme was a DJ Tiesto remix of "We Are All Made of Stars", which featured on the single release.
