= Christopher Price (broadcaster) =

English journalist and presenter

- Born: Christopher Mark Ibbotson-Price; 21 September 1967; Norfolk, England
- Died: 21 April 2002 (aged 34); London, England
- Resting place: Mortlake Crematorium
- Education: University of Reading
- Years active: 1993–2002
- Employer: BBC
- Notable credit: Liquid News

Christopher Mark Ibbotson-Price (21 September 1967 – 21 April 2002) was an English journalist and presenter, who was best known as the original host of BBC celebrity news show Liquid News.

== Early life ==
Price was born in Norfolk on 21 September 1967 and was adopted shortly afterwards. In his early days, he attended Worth School, a Roman Catholic boarding school in Sussex. After school, he studied Italian at the University of Reading. However, he left university with the desire to become a journalist – he enrolled into the BBC reporter training scheme in 1991.

== Career ==
Once completed, Price pursued his desire and in 1993, he became a reporter on Radio Berkshire – soon to move to Radio Solent. In March 1994, he joined BBC Radio 5 Live to eventually become a Senior Broadcast Journalist. He sometimes stood in for Sybil Ruscoe, and occasionally presented Up All Night.

Price joined BBC News 24 when it was launched in November 1997 and presented a mixture of news, fashion, and entertainment in a 10:30 pm slot, claiming to have been told he was too camp to read the news. He and the producer Chris Wilson put together a nightly entertainment news discussion programme called Zero 30.

=== Liquid News ===
After Stuart Murphy said that he enjoyed the programme he was persuaded to take it to digital television channel BBC Choice where it became Liquid News on 30 May 2000. The show became a cult hit on BBC Choice. Even though the viewing figures were not very large, the critical reaction to the show was excellent, and Liquid News quickly became the flagship programme of the channel.

In 2001, Price hit the headlines when he signed a £280,000 two-year contract. Under his new contract, he hosted extra editions of Liquid News for BBC One, BBC Prime and BBC America, raising his profile further. Some sections of the press considered his salary to be too much for a presenter on a digital channel. However, the BBC recognised Price's potential and were keen to keep him from "defecting" to a rival network. At the time, Price himself was quoted as jokingly saying that he didn't understand why people would want to watch a programme presented by a "fat, balding, homosexual". Under proposals which were awaiting government approval, Price and Liquid News would have been the centrepiece of a new BBC channel, BBC Three.

Price hosted his last edition of Liquid News on 16 April 2002.

=== Other work ===
In 2002, Price co-hosted BBC One's A Song for Europe competition to choose the UK entry into the Eurovision Song Contest. He had previously hosted BBC Choice shows relating to the contest, including the preview programmes. He had been scheduled to host BBC Choice's alternative coverage of the contest in May 2002.

Before his death, Price was linked to a new BBC quiz show and a breakfast show on Channel 4.

== Death ==
Towards the end of April 2002, Price was off work for a week with an acute ear infection. He died of heart failure on the night of 21 April 2002 caused by meningoencephalitis – an 'extremely rare' condition that had probably spread from his ear infection. On 22 April 2002, he failed to turn up for work and his close friends Robert Nisbet and Stephanie West went to his flat in Wells Street, off Oxford Street, in central London and found Price dead.

Celebrities such as singer Kylie Minogue, comic actor Ralf Little and game show host Anne Robinson paid tribute to him. Within a few days of his death, the BBC website had received over 5,000 e-mails paying tribute to him.

Price's funeral was a traditional Requiem Mass, which was held at the London Oratory on 8 May 2002. A private cremation later took place at Mortlake Crematorium.
