= Castrillo Mota de Judíos =

- Municipality and town
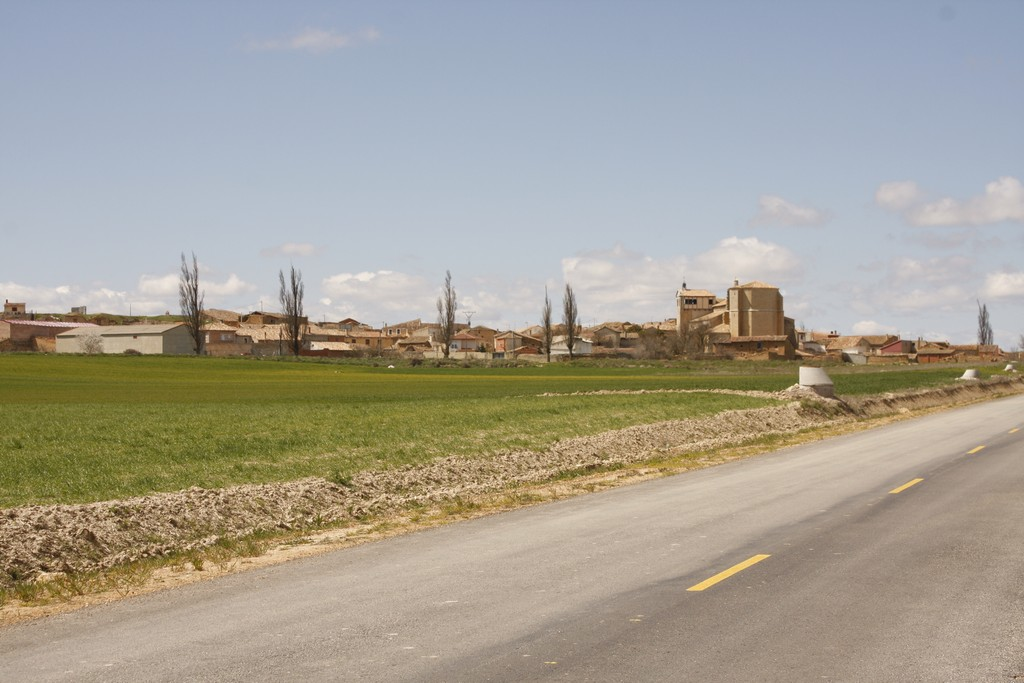
- View of the town in 2010

- Flag Coat of arms

- Location of Castrillo Mota de Judíos in Spain
- Coordinates: 42°18′37″N 04°10′25″W
- Country: Spain
- Autonomous community: Castile and León
- Province: Burgos
- Comarca: Odra-Pisuerga
- Settled: 1035

Area
  - Total: 22.051 km^{2} (8.514 sq mi)
- Elevation: 791 m (2,595 ft)

Population (2025-01-01)
  - Total: 48
  - Density: 2.2/km^{2} (5.6/sq mi)
- Time zone: UTC+1 (CET)
  - Summer (DST): UTC+2 (CEST)
- Postal code: 09107
- Website: Official website

Castrillo Mota de Judíos is a municipality located in the province of Burgos, Castile and León, Spain. The 2004 census (INE) indicated the municipality had a population of 71 inhabitants.

== Geography ==
The town is located on a plain area, near the river Odra, 51 km (32 mi) west of Burgos and 54 km (34 mi) northeast of Palencia. It is crossed by the roads BU-400 and BU-403.

== History ==
=== Name ===
The town was originally named Castrillo Motajudíos ("Jew hill camp") in 1035 when Jews fleeing from a nearby pogrom settled there; it was changed to Castrillo Matajudíos ("Jew-killer camp") in 1627 during a period of religious persecution of non-Christians in Spain (the Jews had been expelled from Spain in 1492 during the Spanish Inquisition). In June 2015 the name was changed back to Castrillo Mota de Judíos following a campaign led by mayor Lorenzo Rodríguez leading to a vote among the villagers in May 2014.

There have been several antisemitic incidents since the name change.

In 2022, the town inaugurated a Sephardic Jewish memorial center to pay tribute to its history of Sephardic Jewry.

In October 2026, the Hispanic Jewish Foundation awarded the Doña Gracia Prize to the mayor and to the town's residents in recognition of their efforts to recover the town's Jewish history.

== Personalities ==
- Antonio de Cabezón (1510–1566) – composer and organist

== Twin towns ==
Castrillo Mota de Judíos is twinned with:

- Kfar Vradim, Israel

== See also ==
- Saint James the Moor-slayer, or Santiago Matamoros, the subject of the Way of St. James legend in Northern Spain
- La Mort aux Juifs, a French town whose name translates to "Death to Jews"
