= La Mort aux Juifs =

French Hamlet

Coordinates: 48°2′12.89″N 2°54′13.05″E

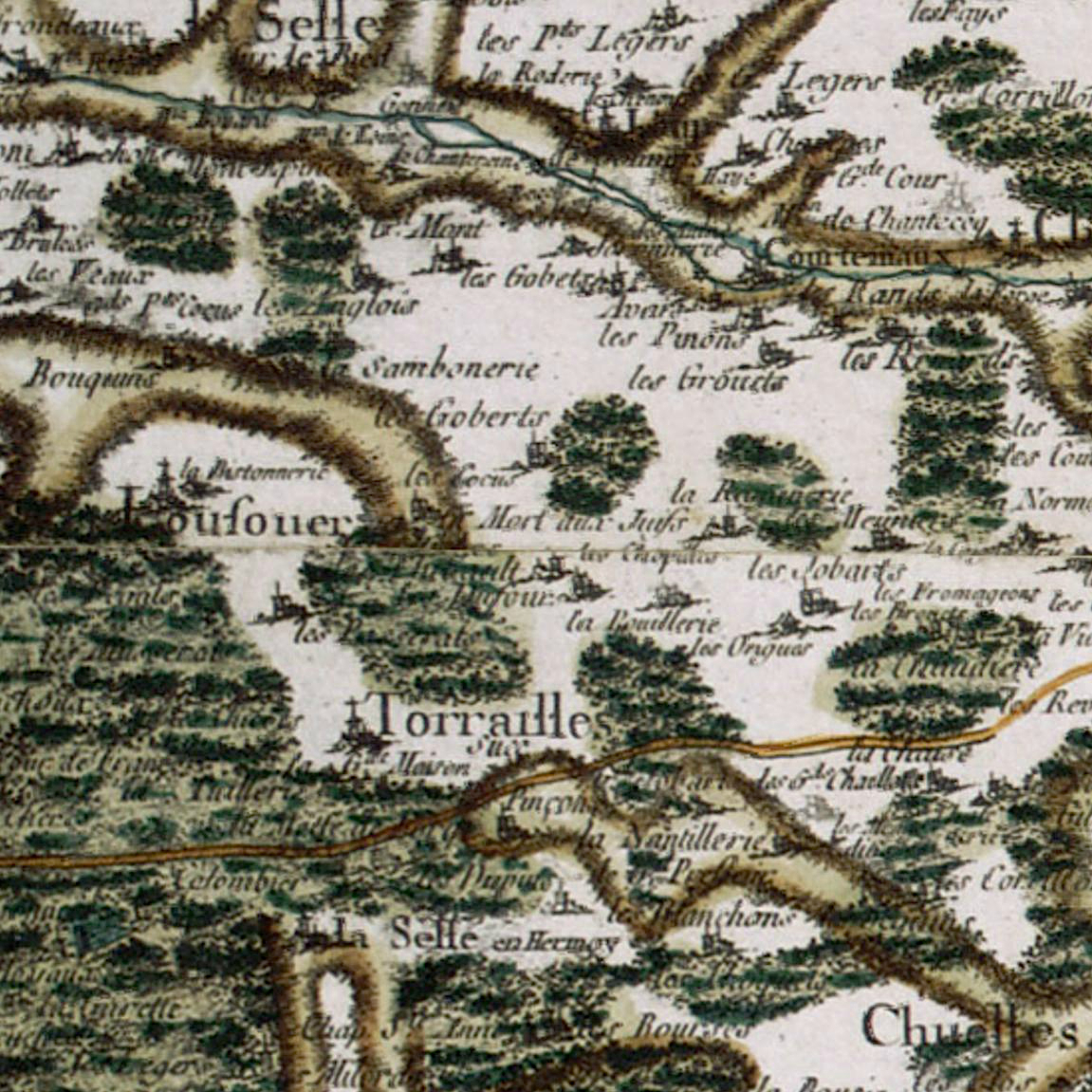
La Mort aux Juifs in the map of Cassini around 1757

La Mort aux Juifs (French pronunciation: [la mɔʁ o ʒɥif]) was a hamlet under the jurisdiction of the French commune of Courtemaux in the Loiret department in north-central France from the 14th century until 2014. Its name has been translated as "Death to Jews" or "The death of the Jews".

== Origin of the name ==
The name dates to the 14th century. According to toponymist Pierre-Henri Billy, the name was initially "la mare au juin″, which means "the liquid manure pond" in local old French. Like in other toponyms in the area, those words evolved, becoming ultimately "la Mort aux Juifs" with an intermediate form "la mare au Juif" quoted by the local historian Paul Gache. The transformation of "mare" (pond) into "mort" (death) is very frequent in old French toponyms, and "juin" (liquid manure) would have become "juif" (Jew) in two steps, first a denasalization turning "juin" into "jui" and then a graphical change into "juif", which had the same pronunciation in old French.

== Name change ==
In August 2014, the Simon Wiesenthal Center petitioned the French government to change the name, which it claimed translates as "Death to the Jews", a translation rejected in France. A similar request had been denied in 1992. Under pressure from the national authorities, however, the municipal council retired the name in January 2015. The area is now split between the nearby hamlets of Les Croisilles and La Dogetterie.

== See also ==
- Communes of the Loiret department
- History of the Loiret
- History of the Jews in France
- Castrillo Mota de Judíos, Spanish town whose name until 2015, Castrillo Matajudíos, translated to "Jew-killer Camp"
